= 2027 Himachal Pradesh Legislative Assembly election =

Indian state legislative election scheduled for 2027

- By November 2027

All 68 elected seats in the Himachal Pradesh Legislative Assembly 35 seats needed for a majority
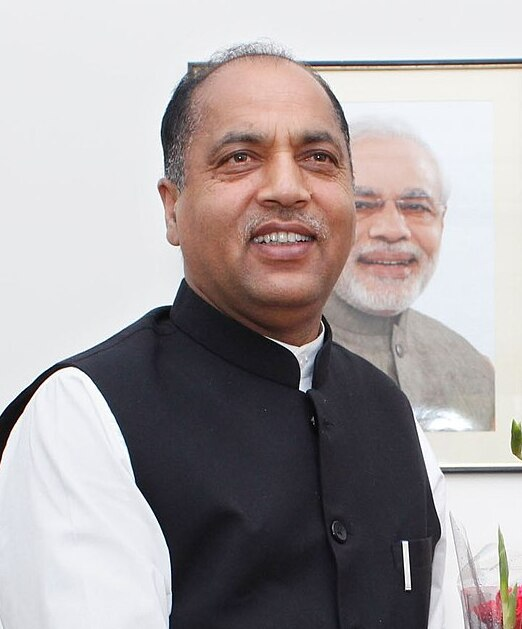

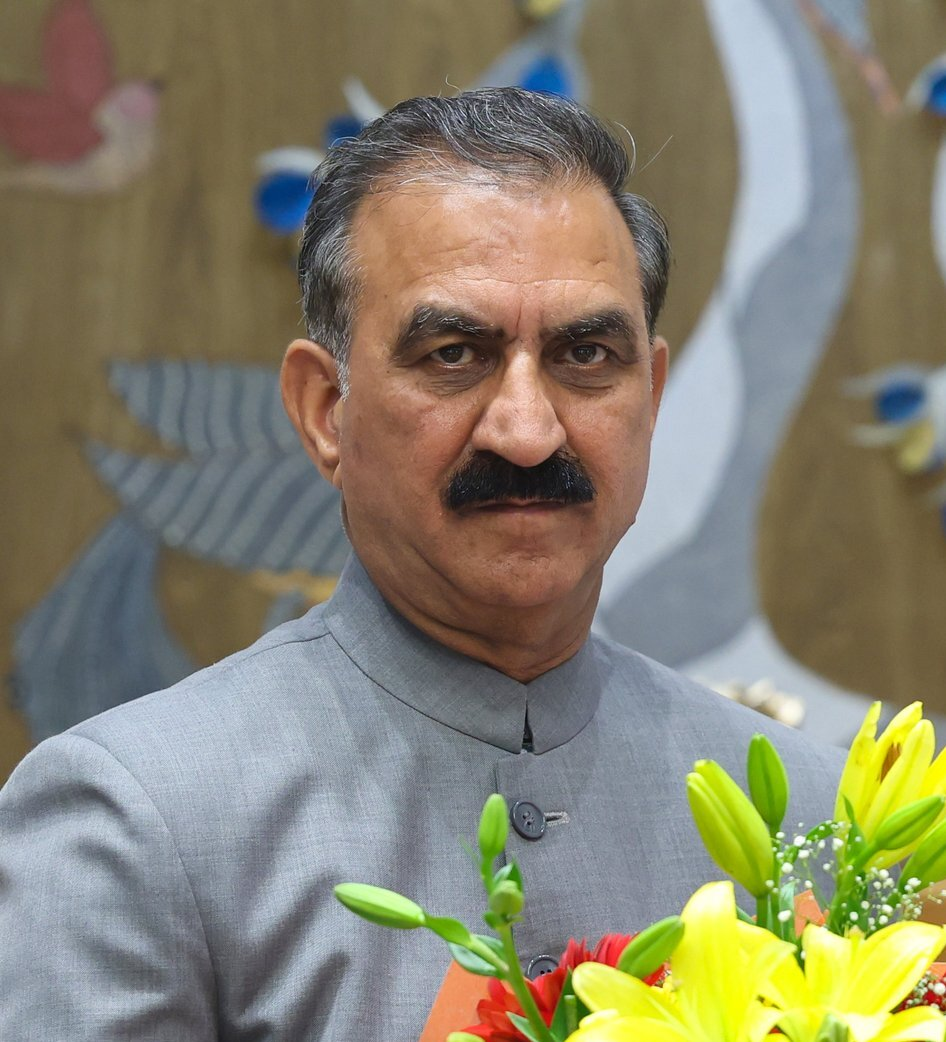
Leader	Jai Ram Thakur	Sukhvinder Singh Sukhu
Party	BJP	INC
Alliance	NDA	INDIA
Leader since	2017	2022
Leader's seat	Seraj; Nadaun	Nadaun
Last election	43%, 25 seats	43.90%, 40 seats
Current seats	28	39
Seats needed	▲7	(Note: ▼4 needed to have the exact majority mark (35))
- Map of the assembly constituencies in Himachal Pradesh
Incumbent Chief Minister
Sukhvinder Singh Sukhu
INC

Legislative assembly elections are expected to be held in Himachal Pradesh in November 2027 to elect all 68 members of the Himachal Pradesh Legislative Assembly. Sukhvinder Singh Sukhu is the incumbent Chief Minister of Himachal Pradesh.

== Schedule ==
Event	Date
Date of notification	TBD
Last date for filing nominations	TBD
Scrutiny of nominations	TBD
Last date for withdrawal of nomination	TBD
Date of Polling	TBD
Date of Counting of votes	TBD
Deadline for the completion of election process	TBD

== Parties and Alliances ==
Party	Flag	Symbol	Leader	Seats contested
Indian National Congress			Sukhvinder Singh Sukhu	TBD
Bharatiya Janata Party			Jai Ram Thakur	TBD
Aam Aadmi Party			Surjeet Singh Thakur	TBD
Communist Party of India (Marxist)			Sanjay Chauhan	TBD
Rashtriya Devbhumi Party				TBD
Bahujan Samaj Party			Narayan Singh Azad	TBD

== Candidates ==
District	Constituency					
District	Constituency		INC		BJP	
Chamba	1	Churah(SC)	INC		BJP	
Chamba	2	Bharmour (ST)	INC		BJP	
Chamba	3	Chamba	INC		BJP	
Chamba	4	Dalhousie	INC		BJP	
Chamba	5	Bhattiyat	INC		BJP	
Kangra	6	Nurpur	INC		BJP	
Kangra	7	Indora (SC)	INC		BJP	
Kangra	8	Fatehpur	INC		BJP	
Kangra	9	Jawali	INC		BJP	
Kangra	10	Dehra	INC		BJP	
Kangra	11	Jaswan-Pragpur	INC		BJP	
Kangra	12	Jawalamukhi	INC		BJP	
Kangra	13	Jaisinghpur (SC)	INC		BJP	
Kangra	14	Sullah	INC		BJP	
Kangra	15	Nagrota	INC		BJP	
Kangra	16	Kangra	INC		BJP	
Kangra	17	Shahpur	INC		BJP	
Kangra	18	Dharamshala	INC		BJP	
Kangra	19	Palampur	INC		BJP	
Kangra	20	Baijnath (SC)	INC		BJP	
Lahaul and Spiti	21	Lahaul and Spiti (ST)	INC		BJP	
Kullu	22	Manali	INC		BJP	
Kullu	23	Kullu	INC		BJP	
Kullu	24	Banjar	INC		BJP	
Kullu	25	Anni (SC)	INC		BJP	
Mandi	26	Karsog (SC)	INC		BJP	
Mandi	27	Sundernagar	INC		BJP	
Mandi	28	Nachan (SC)	INC		BJP	
Mandi	29	Seraj	INC		BJP	Jai Ram Thakur
Mandi	30	Darang	INC		BJP	
Mandi	31	Jogindernagar	INC		BJP	
Mandi	32	Dharampur	INC		BJP	
Mandi	33	Mandi	INC		BJP	
Mandi	34	Balh (SC)	INC		BJP	
Mandi	35	Sarkaghat	INC		BJP	
Hamirpur	36	Bhoranj (SC)	INC		BJP	
Hamirpur	37	Sujanpur	INC		BJP	
Hamirpur	38	Hamirpur	INC		BJP	
Hamirpur	39	Barsar	INC		BJP	
Hamirpur	40	Nadaun	INC	Sukhvinder Singh Sukhu	BJP	
Una	41	Chintpurni (SC)	INC		BJP	
Una	42	Gagret	INC		BJP	
Una	43	Haroli	INC		BJP	
Una	44	Una	INC		BJP	
Una	45	Kutlehar	INC		BJP	
Bilaspur	46	Jhanduta (SC)	INC		BJP	
Bilaspur	47	Ghumarwin	INC		BJP	
Bilaspur	48	Bilaspur	INC		BJP	
Bilaspur	49	Sri Naina Deviji	INC		BJP	
Solan	50	Arki	INC		BJP	
Solan	51	Nalagarh	INC		BJP	
Solan	52	Doon	INC		BJP	
Solan	53	Solan (SC)	INC		BJP	
Solan	54	Kasauli (SC)	INC		BJP	
Sirmaur	55	Pachhad (SC)	INC		BJP	
Sirmaur	56	Nahan	INC		BJP	
Sirmaur	57	Sri Renukaji (SC)	INC		BJP	
Sirmaur	58	Paonta Sahib	INC		BJP	
Sirmaur	59	Shillai	INC		BJP	
Shimla	60	Chopal	INC		BJP	
Shimla	61	Theog	INC		BJP	
Shimla	62	Kasumpti	INC		BJP	
Shimla	63	Shimla	INC		BJP	
Shimla	64	Shimla Rural	INC		BJP	
Shimla	65	Jubbal-Kotkhai	INC		BJP	
Shimla	66	Rampur (SC)	INC		BJP	
Shimla	67	Rohru (SC)	INC		BJP	
Kinnaur	68	Kinnaur (ST)	INC		BJP	

== Voter turnout ==
District	Seats	Turnout (%)
Chamba	5	
Kangra	15	
Lahaul and Spiti	1	
Kullu	4	
Mandi	10	
Hamirpur	5	
Una	5	
Bilaspur	4	
Solan	5	
Sirmaur	5	
Shimla	8	
Kinnaur	1	
Total	68	

== Results ==
=== Results by alliance or party ===
Alliance/ Party	Popular vote			Seats		
Alliance/ Party	Votes	%	±pp	Contested	Won	+/−
Indian National Congress						
Bharatiya Janata Party						
Other parties						
Independents						
NOTA						
Total		100%	—		68	—

=== Results by division ===
Division	Seats			
Division	Seats	INC	BJP	OTH
Kangra	25			
Mandi	24			
Shimla	19			
Total	68			

=== Results by district ===
District	Seats			
District	Seats	INC	BJP	OTH
Chamba	5			
Kangra	15			
Una	5			
Lahaul and Spiti	1			
Kullu	4			
Mandi	10			
Hamirpur	5			
Bilaspur	4			
Solan	5			
Sirmaur	5			
Shimla	8			
Kinnaur	1			
Total	68			

=== Results by constituency ===
District	Constituency		Winner				Runner Up				Margin
District	No.	Name	Candidate	Party	Votes	%	Candidate	Party	Votes	%	Margin
Chamba	1	Churah (SC)									
Chamba	2	Bharmour (ST)									
Chamba	3	Chamba									
Chamba	4	Dalhousie									
Chamba	5	Bhattiyat									
Kangra	6	Nurpur									
Kangra	7	Indora (SC)									
Kangra	8	Fatehpur									
Kangra	9	Jawali									
Kangra	10	Dehra									
Kangra	11	Jaswan-Pragpur									
Kangra	12	Jawalamukhi									
Kangra	13	Jaisinghpur (SC)									
Kangra	14	Sullah									
Kangra	15	Nagrota									
Kangra	16	Kangra									
Kangra	17	Shahpur									
Kangra	18	Dharamshala									
Kangra	19	Palampur									
Kangra	20	Baijnath (SC)									
Lahaul and Spiti	21	Lahaul and Spiti (ST)									
Kullu	22	Manali									
Kullu	23	Kullu									
Kullu	24	Banjar									
Kullu	25	Anni (SC)									
Mandi	26	Karsog (SC)									
Mandi	27	Sundernagar									
Mandi	28	Nachan (SC)									
Mandi	29	Seraj									
Mandi	30	Darang									
Mandi	31	Jogindernagar									
Mandi	32	Dharampur									
Mandi	33	Mandi									
Mandi	34	Balh (SC)									
Mandi	35	Sarkaghat									
Hamirpur	36	Bhoranj (SC)									
Hamirpur	37	Sujanpur									
Hamirpur	38	Hamirpur									
Hamirpur	39	Barsar									
Hamirpur	40	Nadaun									
Una	41	Chintpurni (SC)									
Una	42	Gagret									
Una	43	Haroli									
Una	44	Una									
Una	45	Kutlehar									
Bilaspur	46	Jhanduta (SC)									
Bilaspur	47	Ghumarwin									
Bilaspur	48	Bilaspur									
Bilaspur	49	Sri Naina Deviji									
Solan	50	Arki									
Solan	51	Nalagarh									
Solan	52	Doon									
Solan	53	Solan (SC)									
Solan	54	Kasauli (SC)									
Sirmaur	55	Pachhad (SC)									
Sirmaur	56	Nahan									
Sirmaur	57	Sri Renukaji (SC)									
Sirmaur	58	Paonta Sahib									
Sirmaur	59	Shillai									
Shimla	60	Chopal									
Shimla	61	Theog									
Shimla	62	Kasumpti									
Shimla	63	Shimla									
Shimla	64	Shimla Rural									
Shimla	65	Jubbal-Kotkhai									
Shimla	66	Rampur (SC)									
Shimla	67	Rohru (SC)									
Kinnaur	68	Kinnaur (ST)									

== See also ==
- Elections in Himachal Pradesh
- Politics of Himachal Pradesh
