= 14th Himachal Pradesh Assembly =

Indian state legislature from 2022

14th Legislative Assembly
- Himachal Pradesh Legislative Assembly

Type
- Type: Unicameral
- Term limits: 5 years

History
- Preceded by: 13th Legislative Assembly

Leadership
- Speaker: Kuldeep Singh Pathania, INC since 05 January 2023
- Leader of the House (Chief Minister): Sukhvinder Singh Sukhu, INC since 2022
- Deputy Chief Minister (Deputy Leader of the House): Mukesh Agnihotri, INC since 2022
- Leader of the Opposition: Jai Ram Thakur, BJP since 25 December 2022

Structure
- Seats: 68
- Political groups: Government (39): INC (40); Opposition (28): BJP (28); Vacant (1) (Note: Death of Congress MLA Nand Lal)

Elections
- Voting system: First past the post
- Last election: 12 November 2022
- Next election: 2027

Meeting place
- Himachal Pradesh Legislative Assembly, Dharamshala, Himachal Pradesh, India
- Himachal Pradesh Legislative Assembly, Shimla, Himachal Pradesh, India

Website
- Himachal Pradesh Legislative Assembly

The 14th Legislative Assembly of Himachal Pradesh is formed following the 2022 Assembly election for all 68 seats in the unicameral legislature. In December 2027, the 14th Assembly's term will come to an end.

In the 2022 elections, the Congress had gained a significant majority of 40 seats. In early 2024, the BJP won a Rajya Sabha election with the cross-voting of 6 Congress MLAs. These MLAs led a rebellion against Sukhu, were disqualified and joined the BJP. However, in the bypolls which followed, Congress won four seats and BJP won only two.

== Notable positions ==
Position	Portrait	Name	Party	Constituency	Office Taken
Speaker		Kuldeep Singh Pathania	INC	Bhattiyat	5 January 2023
Deputy Speaker	Vacant				
Leader of the House (Chief Minister)		Sukhvinder Singh Sukhu	INC	Nadaun	11 December 2022
Deputy Leader of the house (Deputy Chief Minister)		Mukesh Agnihotri	INC	Haroli	11 December 2022
Leader of the opposition & deputy		Jai Ram Thakur & unknown	BJP	Seraj	25 December 2022
Chief Whip
Minister of Parliamentary affairs

== Members of Legislative Assembly ==
District	Constituency	Name	Party		Remarks	Lok Sabha constituency			
Chamba	Churah (SC)	Hans Raj		Bharatiya Janata Party		Kangra			
Chamba	Bharmour (ST)	Janak Raj		Bharatiya Janata Party		Kangra			
Chamba	Chamba	Neeraj Nayar		Indian National Congress		Kangra			
Chamba	Dalhousie	D S Thakur		Bharatiya Janata Party		Kangra			
Chamba	Bhattiyat	Kuldeep Singh Pathania		Indian National Congress	Speaker	Kangra			
Kangra	Nurpur	Ranveer Singh		Bharatiya Janata Party		Kangra			
Kangra	Indora (SC)	Malender Rajan		Indian National Congress		Kangra			
Kangra	Fatehpur	Bhawani Singh Pathania		Indian National Congress		Kangra			
Kangra	Jawali	Chander Kumar		Indian National Congress	Cabinet Minister	Kangra			
Kangra	Dehra	Hoshyar Singh		Independent	Resigned on 22 March 2024	Hamirpur			
Kangra	Dehra	Kamlesh Thakur		Indian National Congress	Elected on 13 Jul 2024	Hamirpur			
Kangra	Jaswan-Pragpur	Bikram Thakur		Bharatiya Janata Party		Hamirpur			
Kangra	Jawalamukhi	Sanjay Rattan		Indian National Congress		Kangra			
Kangra	Jaisinghpur (SC)	Yadvinder Goma		Indian National Congress	Cabinet Minister	Kangra			
Kangra	Sullah	Vipin Singh Parmar		Bharatiya Janata Party		Kangra			
Kangra	Nagrota	Raghubir Singh Bali		Indian National Congress		Kangra			
Kangra	Kangra	Pawan Kumar Kajal		Bharatiya Janata Party		Kangra			
Kangra	Shahpur	Kewal Singh Pathania		Indian National Congress		Kangra			
Kangra	Dharamshala	Sudhir Sharma		Indian National Congress	Disqualified on 28 February 2024	Kangra			
Kangra	Dharamshala	Sudhir Sharma		Bharatiya Janata Party	Elected on 4 Jun 2024	Kangra			
Kangra	Palampur	Ashish Butail		Indian National Congress		Kangra			
Kangra	Baijnath (SC)	Kishori Lal		Indian National Congress		Kangra			
Lahaul and Spiti	Lahaul and Spiti (ST)	Ravi Thakur		Indian National Congress	Disqualified on 28 February 2024	Mandi			
Lahaul and Spiti	Lahaul and Spiti (ST)	Anuradha Rana		Indian National Congress	Elected on 4 Jun 2024	Mandi			
Kullu	Manali	Bhuvneshwar Gaur		Indian National Congress		Mandi			
Kullu	Kullu	Sunder Singh Thakur		Indian National Congress		Mandi			
Kullu	Banjar	Surender Shourie		Bharatiya Janata Party		Mandi			
Kullu	Anni (SC)	Lokendra Kumar		Bharatiya Janata Party		Mandi			
Mandi	Karsog (SC)	Deepraj Kapoor		Bharatiya Janata Party		Mandi			
Mandi	Sundernagar	Rakesh Jamwal		Bharatiya Janata Party		Mandi			
Mandi	Nachan (SC)	Vinod Kumar (politician)		Bharatiya Janata Party		Mandi			
Mandi	Seraj	Jai Ram Thakur		Bharatiya Janata Party	Leader of Opposition	Mandi			
Mandi	Darang	Puranchand Thakur		Bharatiya Janata Party		Mandi			
Mandi	Jogindernagar	Prakash Rana		Bharatiya Janata Party		Mandi			
Mandi	Dharampur	Chandershekhar		Indian National Congress		Hamirpur			
Mandi	Mandi	Anil Sharma		Bharatiya Janata Party		Mandi			
Mandi	Balh (SC)	Inder Singh Gandhi		Bharatiya Janata Party		Mandi			
Mandi	Sarkaghat	Dalip Thakur		Bharatiya Janata Party		Mandi			
Hamirpur	Bhoranj (SC)	Suresh Kumar		Indian National Congress		Hamirpur			
Hamirpur	Sujanpur	Rajinder Singh Rana		Indian National Congress	Disqualified on 28 February 2024	Hamirpur			
Hamirpur	Sujanpur	Ranjit Singh		Indian National Congress	Elected on 4 Jun 2024	Hamirpur			
Hamirpur	Hamirpur	Ashish Sharma		Independent	Resigned on 22 March 2024	Hamirpur			
Hamirpur	Hamirpur	Ashish Sharma		Bharatiya Janata Party	Elected on 13 July 2024	Hamirpur			
Hamirpur	Barsar	Inder Dutt Lakhanpal		Indian National Congress	Disqualified on 28 February 2024	Hamirpur			
Hamirpur	Barsar	Inder Dutt Lakhanpal		Bharatiya Janata Party	Elected on 4 Jun 2024	Hamirpur			
Hamirpur	Nadaun	Sukhvinder Singh Sukhu		Indian National Congress	Chief Minister	Hamirpur			
Una	Chintpurni (SC)	Sudarshan Singh Babloo		Indian National Congress		Hamirpur			
Una	Gagret	Chaitanya Sharma		Indian National Congress	Disqualified on 28 February 2024	Hamirpur			
Una	Gagret	Rakesh Kalia		Indian National Congress	Elected on 4 Jun 2024	Hamirpur			
Una	Haroli	Mukesh Agnihotri		Indian National Congress	Deputy Chief Minister	Hamirpur			
Una	Una	Satpal Singh Satti		Bharatiya Janata Party		Hamirpur			
Una	Kutlehar	Devender Kumar Bhutto		Indian National Congress	Disqualified on 28 February 2024	Hamirpur			
Una	Kutlehar	Vivek Sharma		Indian National Congress	Elected on 4 Jun 2024	Hamirpur			
Bilaspur	Jhanduta (SC)	Jeet Ram Katwal		Bharatiya Janata Party		Hamirpur			
Bilaspur	Ghumarwin	Rajesh Dharmani		Indian National Congress	Cabinet Minister	Hamirpur			
Bilaspur	Bilaspur	Trilok Jamwal		Bharatiya Janata Party		Hamirpur			
Bilaspur	Sri Naina Deviji	Randhir Sharma		Bharatiya Janata Party		Hamirpur			
Solan	Arki	Sanjay Awasthy		Indian National Congress		Shimla			
Solan	Nalagarh	K.L. Thakur		Independent	Resigned on 22 March 2024	Shimla			
Solan	Nalagarh	Hardeep Singh Bawa		Indian National Congress	Elected on 13 July 2024	Shimla			
Solan	Doon	Ram Kumar Chaudhary		Indian National Congress		Shimla			
Solan	Solan (SC)	Dhani Ram Shandil		Indian National Congress	Cabinet Minister	Shimla			
Solan	Kasauli (SC)	Vinod Sultanpuri		Indian National Congress		Shimla			
Sirmaur	Pachhad (SC)	Reena Kashyap		Bharatiya Janata Party		Shimla			
Sirmaur	Nahan	Ajay Solanki		Indian National Congress		Shimla			
Sirmaur	Sri Renukaji (SC)	Vinay Kumar		Indian National Congress	Ex Deputy Speaker	Shimla			
Sirmaur	Paonta Sahib	Sukh Ram Chaudhary		Bharatiya Janata Party		Shimla			
Sirmaur	Shillai	Harshwardhan Chauhan		Indian National Congress	Cabinet Minister	Shimla			
Shimla	Chopal	Balbir Singh Verma		Bharatiya Janata Party		Shimla			
Shimla	Theog	Kuldeep Singh Rathore		Indian National Congress		Shimla			
Shimla	Kasumpti	Anirudh Singh		Indian National Congress	Cabinet Minister	Shimla			
Shimla	Shimla	Harish Janartha		Indian National Congress		Shimla			
Shimla	Shimla Rural	Vikramaditya Singh		Indian National Congress	Cabinet minister	Shimla			
Shimla	Jubbal-Kotkhai	Rohit Thakur		Indian National Congress	Cabinet minister	Shimla			
Shimla	Rampur (SC)	Nand Lal		Indian National Congress	Died on 3 November 2026; By- elections necessited|-	Shimla	Rohru (SC)	Mohan Lal Brakta	Indian National Congress
Shimla	Kinnaur	Kinnaur (ST)	Jagat Singh Negi		Indian National Congress	Shimla	Cabinet Minister		

== Lok Sabha constituency-wise composition ==
Lok Sabha Constituency	Number of Cabinet Ministers, Speaker and Deputy Speaker	Name of Ministers, Speaker and Deputy Speaker	Name of Constituencies (Respectively)
Kangra	3	Kuldeep Singh Pathania (Speaker); Chander Kumar; Yadvinder Goma	Bhattiyat; Jawali; Jaisinghpur (SC)
Mandi	0	-	-
Hamirpur	3	Sukhvinder Singh Sukhu (Chief Minister); Mukesh Agnihotri (Deputy Chief Minister); Rajesh Dharmani	Nadaun; Haroli; Ghumarwin
Shimla	6	Dhani Ram Shandil; Harshwardhan Chauhan; Anirudh Singh; Vikramaditya Singh; Rohit Thakur; Jagat Singh Negi	Solan (SC); Shillai; Kasumpti; Shimla Rural; Jubbal-Kotkhai; Kinnaur (ST)
