= Politics of Himachal Pradesh =

Legislative branch
- Name: Vidhan Sabha
- Type: Unicameral
- Meeting place: Vidhan Bhavan
- Lower house
- Name: Vidhan Sabha
- Presiding officer: Kuldeep Singh Pathania, Speaker of the Vidhan Sabha

Executive branch
- Head of state
- Title: Governor
- Currently: Kavinder gupta
- Appointer: President
- Head of government
- Title: Chief Minister
- Currently: Sukhvinder Singh Sukhu
- Appointer: Governor
- Cabinet
- Name: Himachal Pradesh Council of Ministers
- Current cabinet: Sukhu ministry
- Leader: Chief Minister
- Appointer: Governor
- Ministries: 8

Judicial branch
- Courts: High Court
- Chief judge: Amjad Ahtesham Sayed

The key political players in Himachal Pradesh state in north-west India are the Indian National Congress and Bharatiya Janata Party.

The politics of Himachal Pradesh are more associated with the regional divides of the state. The role of leadership represents two distinct regions Old and New Himachal, which has been crucial from the beginning. Based on electoral divide, the state can be divided as - Upper Himachal consisting the districts of Shimla, Sirmaur and parts of Mandi, Kullu, Lahaul and Spiti, Solan, Kinnaur and Chamba; and Lower Himachal consisting the districts of Kangra, Hamirpur, Bilaspur, Una and the lower region of Mandi district.The State was reorganised on 1966 through the Punjab Reorganisation Act by adding some parts of Punjab to the state of Himachal Pradesh; and the parts of old Himachal and the newly merged areas too differ in their voting pattern.

== National politics ==
There are four Lok Sabha (lower house of the Indian Parliament) constituencies in Himachal Pradesh.

Election	Lok Sabha	Party-wise details		Constituencies					
Election	Lok Sabha	Party	Seats	Kangra	Mandi	Hamirpur	Shimla	Mahasu	Chamba
1951	1st Lok Sabha	INC	4	INC	INC	INC	INC	Not There	Not There
1957	2nd Lok Sabha	INC	4	INC	INC	INC	INC	Not There	Not There
1962	3rd Lok Sabha	INC	4	INC	INC	INC	INC	Not There	Not There
1967	4th Lok Sabha	INC	6	INC	INC	INC	INC	INC	INC
1971	5th Lok Sabha	INC	4	INC	INC	INC	INC	Not There	Not There
1977	6th Lok Sabha	JP	4	JP	JP	JP	JP	Not There	Not There
1980	7th Lok Sabha	INC	4	INC	INC	INC	INC	Not There	Not There
1984	8th Lok Sabha	INC	4	INC	INC	INC	INC	Not There	Not There
1989	9th Lok Sabha	BJP	4	BJP	BJP	BJP	INC	Not There	Not There
1991	10th Lok Sabha	BJP/INC	4	BJP	INC	BJP	INC	Not There	Not There
1996	11th Lok Sabha	INC	4	INC	INC	INC	INC	Not There	Not There
1998	12th Lok Sabha	BJP	4	BJP	BJP	BJP	INC	Not There	Not There
1999	13th Lok Sabha	BJP	4	BJP	BJP	BJP	HVC	Not There	Not There
2004	14th Lok Sabha	INC	4	INC	INC	BJP	INC	Not There	Not There
2009	15th Lok Sabha	BJP	4	BJP	INC	BJP	BJP	Not There	Not There
2014	16th Lok Sabha	BJP	4	BJP	BJP	BJP	BJP	Not There	Not There
2019	17th Lok Sabha	BJP	4	BJP	BJP	BJP	BJP	Not There	Not There
2024	18th Lok Sabha	BJP	4	BJP	BJP	BJP	BJP	Not There	Not There

== State politics ==
The Himachal Pradesh's Legislative Assembly currently has 68 seats who are directly elected from single-seat constituencies. An election did not take place for 15 years after 1952 due to the enactment of the States Reorganisation Act in 1956 which designated Himachal Pradesh as a Union Territory instead of a Part-C state, falling under the direct control of the President of India. Accordingly, the Legislative Assembly was dissolved. This was later changed in 1963 when the Government of Union Territories Act was passed, providing Himachal with a Legislative Assembly and Chief Minister again. Election were first held again in 1967, after the Punjab Reorganisation Act (1966) was passed, transferring some territory to Himachal Pradesh. Eventually, Himachal Pradesh became a fully fledged state (the 18th of the Union) with the passing of The State of Himachal Pradesh Act in 1970.

The Indian National Congress dominated the state assembly throughout the 1960s and early 1970s, much like most of the nation. The state's first Chief Minister was Yashwant Singh Parmar, who led the region's early development post-Independence. Parmar is still widely celebrated to this day and is even called "The Founder of Himachal Pradesh". After differences with party leaders, Parmar eventually resigned in 1977 at the age of 71. Thakur Ram Lal served as the 2nd Chief Minister until the elections that year. However, in 1977, with Prime Minister Indira Gandhi's Emergency extremely unpopular throughout the nation, Congress were dealt heavy electoral blows. The state party lost in a landslide to the opposition Janata Party, with Shanta Kumar becoming the state's 3rd Chief Minister. His ministry only lasted for 3 years though, and after multiple party defections, Congress regained power in February 1980 with Ram Lal once again assuming the office of Chief Minister. This administration didn't last either, and after scandals and political turmoil, Ram Lal was forced to resign in 1983, a year after he'd narrowly won re-election. He was replaced by fellow Congress leader Virbhadra Singh. Ever since 1985, no incumbent party has managed to retain control of the Legislative Assembly, and power has flipped between the BJP and INC every few years.

=== 1952 Legislative Assembly election ===
Election	Vidhan Sabha	Party-wise details		Chief Minister	Party
Election	Vidhan Sabha	Party	Seats	Chief Minister	Party
1952	1st Vidhan Sabha	Indian National Congress	24	Yashwant Singh Parmar	INC
1952	1st Vidhan Sabha	Kisan Mazdoor Praja Party	3	Yashwant Singh Parmar	INC
1952	1st Vidhan Sabha	Independent	8	Yashwant Singh Parmar	INC
1952	1st Vidhan Sabha	Scheduled Caste Federation	1	Yashwant Singh Parmar	INC
1952	1st Vidhan Sabha	Total	36	Yashwant Singh Parmar	INC

=== 1967 Legislative Assembly election ===
Election	Vidhan Sabha	Party-wise details		Chief Minister	Party
Election	Vidhan Sabha	Party	Seats	Chief Minister	Party
1967	2nd Vidhan Sabha	Indian National Congress	34	Yashwant Singh Parmar	INC
1967	2nd Vidhan Sabha	Independent	16	Yashwant Singh Parmar	INC
1967	2nd Vidhan Sabha	Bharatiya Jana Sangh	7	Yashwant Singh Parmar	INC
1967	2nd Vidhan Sabha	Communist Party of India	2	Yashwant Singh Parmar	INC
1967	2nd Vidhan Sabha	Swatantra Party	1	Yashwant Singh Parmar	INC
1967	2nd Vidhan Sabha	Total	60	Yashwant Singh Parmar	INC

=== 1972 Legislative Assembly election ===
Election	Vidhan Sabha	Party-wise details		Chief Minister	Party
Election	Vidhan Sabha	Party	Seats	Chief Minister	Party
1972	3rd Vidhan Sabha	Indian National Congress	53	Yashwant Singh Parmar	INC
1972	3rd Vidhan Sabha	Independent	7	Yashwant Singh Parmar	INC
1972	3rd Vidhan Sabha	Bharatiya Jana Sangh	5	Yashwant Singh Parmar	INC
1972	3rd Vidhan Sabha	Lok Raj Party Himachal Pradesh	2	Yashwant Singh Parmar	INC
1972	3rd Vidhan Sabha	Communist Party of India (Marxist)	1	Yashwant Singh Parmar	INC
1972	3rd Vidhan Sabha	Total	68	Yashwant Singh Parmar	INC

=== 1977 Legislative Assembly election ===
Election	Vidhan Sabha	Party-wise details		Chief Minister	Party
Election	Vidhan Sabha	Party	Seats	Chief Minister	Party
1977	4th Vidhan Sabha	Janta Party	53	Shanta Kumar	JP
1977	4th Vidhan Sabha	Indian National Congress	9	Shanta Kumar	JP
1977	4th Vidhan Sabha	Independent	6	Shanta Kumar	JP
1977	4th Vidhan Sabha	Total	68	Shanta Kumar	JP

=== 1982 Legislative Assembly election ===
Election	Vidhan Sabha	Party-wise details		Chief Minister	Party
Election	Vidhan Sabha	Party	Seats	Chief Minister	Party
1982	5th Vidhan Sabha	Indian National Congress	31	Thakur Ram Lal	INC
1982	5th Vidhan Sabha	Bharatiya Janta Party	29	Thakur Ram Lal	INC
1982	5th Vidhan Sabha	Independent	6	Thakur Ram Lal	INC
1982	5th Vidhan Sabha	Janata Party	2	Thakur Ram Lal	INC
1982	5th Vidhan Sabha	Total	68	Thakur Ram Lal	INC

=== 1985 Legislative Assembly election ===
Election	Vidhan Sabha	Party-wise details		Chief Minister	Party
Election	Vidhan Sabha	Party	Seats	Chief Minister	Party
1985	6th Vidhan Sabha	Indian National Congress	58	Virbhadra Singh	INC
1985	6th Vidhan Sabha	Bharatiya Janta Party	7	Virbhadra Singh	INC
1985	6th Vidhan Sabha	Independent	2	Virbhadra Singh	INC
1985	6th Vidhan Sabha	Lok Dal	1	Virbhadra Singh	INC
1985	6th Vidhan Sabha	Total	68	Virbhadra Singh	INC

=== 1990 Legislative Assembly election ===
Election	Vidhan Sabha	Party-wise details		Chief Minister	Party
Election	Vidhan Sabha	Party	Seats	Chief Minister	Party
1990	7th Vidhan Sabha	Bharatiya Janta Party	46	Shanta Kumar	BJP
1990	7th Vidhan Sabha	Janata Dal	11	Shanta Kumar	BJP
1990	7th Vidhan Sabha	Indian National Congress	9	Shanta Kumar	BJP
1990	7th Vidhan Sabha	Independent	1	Shanta Kumar	BJP
1990	7th Vidhan Sabha	CPI	1	Shanta Kumar	BJP
1990	7th Vidhan Sabha	Total	68	Shanta Kumar	BJP

=== 1993 Legislative Assembly election ===
Election	Vidhan Sabha	Party-wise details		Chief Minister	Party
Election	Vidhan Sabha	Party	Seats	Chief Minister	Party
1993	8th Vidhan Sabha	Indian National Congress	52	Virbhadra Singh	INC
1993	8th Vidhan Sabha	Bharatiya Janta Party	8	Virbhadra Singh	INC
1993	8th Vidhan Sabha	Independent	7	Virbhadra Singh	INC
1993	8th Vidhan Sabha	Communist Party of India (Marxist)	1	Virbhadra Singh	INC
1993	8th Vidhan Sabha	Total	68	Virbhadra Singh	INC

=== 1998 Legislative Assembly election ===
Keys: BJP (-) INC (-) BSP (-) UKD/UKD(P) (-) NCP (-) Independent (-) CPIM (-)

Election	Vidhan Sabha	Party-wise details		Chief Minister	Party
Election	Vidhan Sabha	Party	Seats	Chief Minister	Party
1998	9th Vidhan Sabha	Bharatiya Janta Party	31	Prem Kumar Dhumal	BJP
1998	9th Vidhan Sabha	Indian National Congress	31	Prem Kumar Dhumal	BJP
1998	9th Vidhan Sabha	Himachal Vikas Congress	5	Prem Kumar Dhumal	BJP
1998	9th Vidhan Sabha	Independent	1	Prem Kumar Dhumal	BJP
1998	9th Vidhan Sabha	Total	68	Prem Kumar Dhumal	BJP

=== 2003 Legislative Assembly election ===
Keys: BJP (-) INC (-) BSP (-) UKD/UKD(P) (-) NCP (-) Independent (-) CPIM (-)

Election	Vidhan Sabha	Party-wise details		Chief Minister	Party
Election	Vidhan Sabha	Party	Seats	Chief Minister	Party
2003	10th Vidhan Sabha	Indian National Congress	43	Virbhadra Singh	INC
2003	10th Vidhan Sabha	Bharatiya Janta Party	16	Virbhadra Singh	INC
2003	10th Vidhan Sabha	Independent	6	Virbhadra Singh	INC
2003	10th Vidhan Sabha	Himachal Vikas Congress	1	Virbhadra Singh	INC
2003	10th Vidhan Sabha	Lok Janshakti Party	1	Virbhadra Singh	INC
2003	10th Vidhan Sabha	Loktantrik Morcha Himachal Pradesh	1	Virbhadra Singh	INC
2003	10th Vidhan Sabha	Total	68	Virbhadra Singh	INC

=== 2007 Legislative Assembly election ===
The 2007 Himachal Pradesh legislative assembly election were held in Himachal Pradesh in 2007.

Keys: BJP (-) INC (-) BSP (-) Independent (-)

Election	Vidhan Sabha	Party-wise details		Chief Minister	Party
Election	Vidhan Sabha	Party	Seats	Chief Minister	Party
2007	11th Vidhan Sabha	Bharatiya Janta Party	41	Prem Kumar Dhumal	BJP
2007	11th Vidhan Sabha	Indian National Congress	23	Prem Kumar Dhumal	BJP
2007	11th Vidhan Sabha	Independent	3	Prem Kumar Dhumal	BJP
2007	11th Vidhan Sabha	Bahujan Samaj Party	1	Prem Kumar Dhumal	BJP
2007	11th Vidhan Sabha	Total	68	Prem Kumar Dhumal	BJP

=== 2012 Legislative Assembly election ===
Keys: BJP (-) INC (-) BSP (-) UKD/UKD(P) (-) NCP (-) Independent (-) CPIM (-)

Election	Vidhan Sabha	Party-wise details		Chief Minister	Party
Election	Vidhan Sabha	Party	Seats	Chief Minister	Party
2012	12th Vidhan Sabha	Indian National Congress	36	Virbhadra Singh	INC
2012	12th Vidhan Sabha	Bharatiya Janta Party	26	Virbhadra Singh	INC
2012	12th Vidhan Sabha	Independent	5	Virbhadra Singh	INC
2012	12th Vidhan Sabha	Himachal Lokhit Party	1	Virbhadra Singh	INC
2012	12th Vidhan Sabha	Total	68	Virbhadra Singh	INC

=== 2017 Legislative Assembly election ===
BJP won 44 out of 68 seats to form the government, ousting Congress party from power. Indian National Congress won 21 seats. Jai Ram Thakur was appointed as Chief Minister after the elections.

Keys: BJP (-) INC (-) BSP (-) UKD/UKD(P) (-) NCP (-) Independent (-) CPIM (-)

Election	Vidhan Sabha	Party-wise details		Chief Minister	Party
Election	Vidhan Sabha	Party	Seats	Chief Minister	Party
2017	13th Vidhan Sabha	Bharatiya Janta Party	44	Jai Ram Thakur	BJP
2017	13th Vidhan Sabha	Indian National Congress	21	Jai Ram Thakur	BJP
2017	13th Vidhan Sabha	Independent	2	Jai Ram Thakur	BJP
2017	13th Vidhan Sabha	Communist Party of India (Marxist)	1	Jai Ram Thakur	BJP
2017	13th Vidhan Sabha	Total	68	Jai Ram Thakur	BJP

=== 2022 Legislative Assembly election ===
Keys: INC (-) BJP (-) Independent (-)

Election	Vidhan Sabha	Party-wise details		Chief Minister	Party
Election	Vidhan Sabha	Party	Seats	Chief Minister	Party
2022	14th Vidhan Sabha	Indian National Congress	40	Sukhvinder Singh Sukhu	INC
2022	14th Vidhan Sabha	Bharatiya Janta Party	28	Sukhvinder Singh Sukhu	INC
2022	14th Vidhan Sabha	Total	68	Sukhvinder Singh Sukhu	INC

== See also ==
- Himachal Pradesh Legislative Assembly
