= Sunder Singh Thakur =

Indian politician (born 1965)

Chief Parliamentary Secretary, Government of Himachal Pradesh
- Incumbent
- Assumed office 8 January 2023
- Governor: Rajendra Arlekar (2022–2023); Shiv Pratap Shukla (2023–2026); Kavinder Gupta (2026–present)
- Chief Minister: Sukhvinder Singh Sukhu
- Deputy CM: Mukesh Agnihotri
- Departments: Power Department; Tourism Department; Forest Department; Transport Department

Member of the Himachal Pradesh Legislative Assembly
- Incumbent
- Assumed office 18 December 2017
- Preceded by: Maheshwar Singh
- Constituency: Kullu

Personal details
- Born: 5 May 1965 (age 61) Palampur, Himachal Pradesh, India
- Party: Indian National Congress
- Spouse: Indira Thakur
- Education: Himachal Pradesh University LL.B

Sunder Singh Thakur (born 5 May 1965) is an Indian politician. He is serving as member of the Himachal Pradesh Legislative Assembly from Kullu since 2017. He is chief parliamentary secretary in Government of Himachal Pradesh.

== Early life and education ==
Sunder Singh Thakur was born on 5 May 1965 in Shallang, Kullu, Himachal Pradesh. He did BSc (Medical) from Punjab University and LL.B from Himachal Pradesh University.

== Political career ==
Sunder Singh Thakur has had a dynamic political career with various responsibilities and positions:

- Organizing Secretary, HIMSA Chandigarh (1985–1986)
- Vice President, H.P. NSUI (1989–1991)
- Chairman, Panchayat Samiti Kullu (1991–1994)
- Vice-Chairman, Zila Parishad Kullu (1994–1999)
- Member of the State Pollution Board (2003–2008) and Himachal Pradesh Sports Council (2013–2017)
- Vice-President, Himachal Pradesh Youth Congress
- State Delegate, H.P. Congress Committee (2009–2012)
- General Secretary, Himachal Pradesh Congress Committee (2012 onwards)

He was elected to the State Legislative Assembly in December 2017 and served on various committees, including the Public Accounts Committee (2021–2022), Subordinate Legislation Committee (2018–2022), General Development Committee (2018–2021), and Privileges Committee (2022).

Sunder Singh Thakur was re-elected to the State Legislative Assembly in December 2022 and appointed Chief Parliamentary Secretary on 8 January 2023. He is attached to the Chief Minister and Deputy Chief Minister for the MPP & Power Department, Tourism Department, Forest Department, and Transport Department, respectively.
