= Sanjay Awasthy =

Indian politician (born 1965)

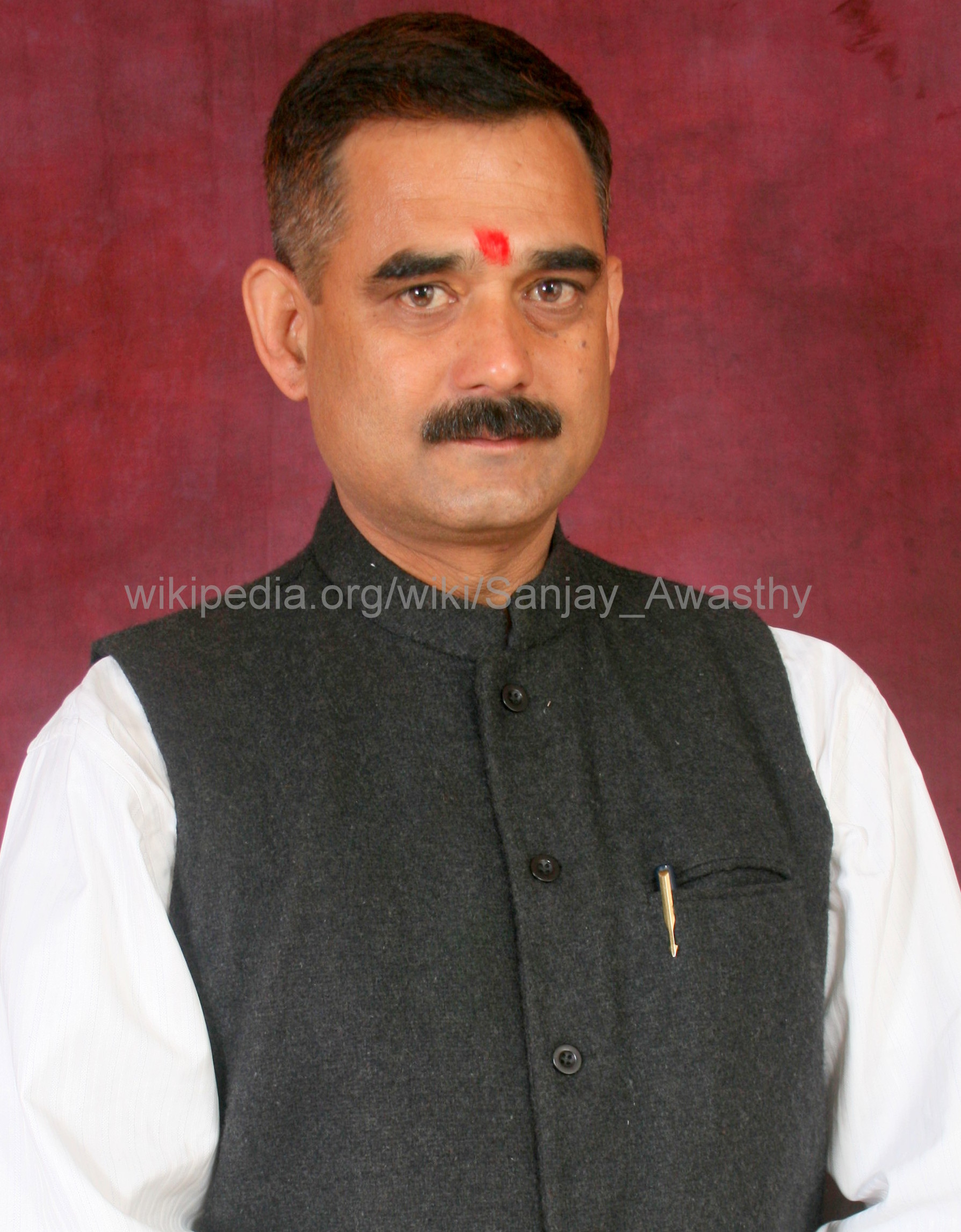

Chief Parliamentary Secretary, Government of Himachal Pradesh
- Incumbent
- Assumed office 8 January 2023
- Governor: Rajendra Arlekar (2022–2023); Shiv Pratap Shukla (2023–2026); Kavinder Gupta (2026–present)
- Chief Minister: Sukhvinder Singh Sukhu
- Deputy CM: Mukesh Agnihotri
- Departments: Information & Public Relations Department; Health; Family Welfare Department, Public Works Department

Member of the Himachal Pradesh Legislative Assembly
- Incumbent
- Assumed office 2 November 2021
- Preceded by: Virbhadra Singh
- Constituency: Arki

Personal details
- Born: 7 October 1965 (age 60) Solan, Himachal Pradesh, India
- Party: Indian National Congress
- Spouse: Meenakshi Awasthy
- Children: 2
- Education: Government College, Sanjauli B.A.; Himachal Pradesh University M.A. (1991-92)
- Occupation: Politician

Sanjay Awasthy is an Indian politician and Member of Legislative Assembly (MLA) representing Arki in the Himachal Pradesh Legislative Assembly in India.

== Early life and education ==
Sanjay Awasthy, born on 7 October 1965 in V.P.O. Kandher, Tehsil Arki, District Solan, Himachal Pradesh, is a multifaceted personality known for his contributions as a social and political worker, horticulturist, and transporter. He is the son of Smt. Amar Lata Awasthy and Late Shri Dila Ram. He gained his Bachelor of Arts from Government College, Sanjauli, Shimla, and Master of Arts from Himachal Pradesh University, Shimla and he is married to Smt. Meenakshi. The couple has two daughters.

== Political career ==
His political journey includes various notable positions and responsibilities:

- Elected Councillor of Municipal Council, Solan, serving from 2000 to 2005
- Presently Vice President of Himachal Pradesh Congress Committee (HPCC)
- Member of All India Congress Committee (AICC) and the Disciplinary Committee, HPCC

Sanjay Awasthy was elected to the State Legislative Assembly in October 2021 through a by-election and became a member of the Welfare Committee in 2022. He was re-elected in December 2022 and was subsequently appointed the Chief Parliamentary Secretary on 8 January 2023. His responsibilities are attached to the Chief Minister, Health Minister, and PWD Minister for the Information & Public Relations Department, Health and Family Welfare Department, and Public Works Department, respectively.

== Social activities ==
Sanjay Awasthy actively engages in social welfare activities, participates in religious programs, contributes to the development of sports, and motivates youth for the anti-drug movement.

== Favorite pastime ==
Awasthy played cricket for Himachal Pradesh, including one first-class appearance in the Ranji Trophy in 1989–90. His favorite pastimes include reading, gardening, and sports.

== Languages known ==
Sanjay Awasthy is proficient in Hindi, English, and Urdu.

== Sports and clubs ==
He has represented the state in first-class cricket, including the Ranji Trophy. Sanjay Awasthy holds the position of President (elected) at the District Cricket Association in Solan and is a member of the Shimla Amateur Dramatic Club.
