= Baliwal =

Village in India

Coordinates: 31°24′37″N 76°11′21″E

Baliwal is a village in Una district, in the state of Himachal Pradesh, India. It is located 11 km from the district headquarters of Una. Its postal code is 177220. This village is near the state's border with Punjab. It falls under the Legislative Assembly electoral constituency of Haroli and the Parliamentary constituency of Hamirpur.
