= Himachal Pradesh State Handicrafts and Handloom Corporation =

Himachal Pradesh State Handicrafts and Handloom Corporation is an agency of Government of Himachal Pradesh set up in 1974 with the aim to assist the artisans and weavers of Himachal Pradesh in their skill development and growth and in procuring raw materials and marketing their products .
