= Bagsiad =

Coordinates: 31.561°N 77.124°E

Bagsiad is a small town at altitude of 2000m which is a central area for two village panchayats (i.e. Sharan and Kandha-Bagsiad) in tehsil Thunag of Seraj constituency in district Mandi, Himachal Pradesh. 13th Chief Minister of Himachal Pradesh Jai Ram Thakur has completed his schooling from government school in this town. –Education facilities: There are government owned as well as private schools in this town, among which are government primary school (LKG to 5th), government Senior secondary school (6th to 12th) and Sarswati Vidya Mandir (LKG to 10th). Also some Himachal Pradesh government owned professional institutions including industrial training institute (ITI) and recently third government B. pharmacy (Allopathy) college has been opened in this town. First batch of B. Pharmacy was started in the July 2019. –Health Facilities: There is a government civil hospital which serves the all basic health needs of public. Even there is a veterinary hospital too.
