= List of deputy chief ministers of Himachal Pradesh =

DCM of H.P state

Deputy Chief Minister of Himachal Pradesh
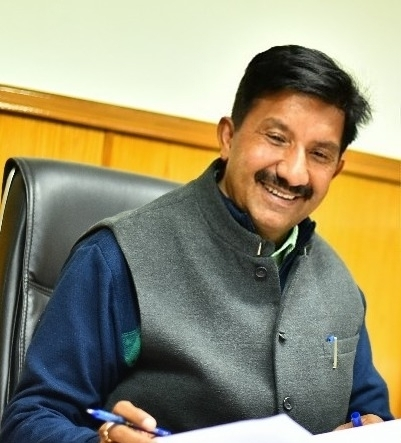
- Incumbent; Mukesh Agnihotri since 11 December 2022
- Government of Himachal Pradesh
- Style: The Honourable (Formal); Mr. Deputy Chief Minister (Informal)
- Type: Deputy Head of Government
- Status: Deputy Leader of the Executive
- Abbreviation: DCM
- Member of: Cabinet; Himachal Pradesh Legislative Assembly
- Reports to: Chief Minister of Himachal Pradesh
- Seat: Himachal Pradesh Secretariat, Shimla
- Nominator: Members of the Government of Himachal Pradesh in Himachal Pradesh Legislative Assembly
- Appointer: Governor of Himachal Pradesh
- Term length: At the confidence of the assembly Deputy Chief minister's term is for 5 years and is subject to no term limits.
- Inaugural holder: Mukesh Agnihotri
- Formation: 11 December 2022
- Website: Official website

The deputy chief minister of Himachal Pradesh is the seniormost cabinet member of the state government who serves as the de facto second head of the state. He is the second highest ranking executive authority of the state's council of ministers. The first and current deputy chief minister of Himachal Pradesh is Mukesh Agnihotri, serving in office since 11 December 2022.

The position of deputy chief minister is not explicitly defined or mentioned in the Constitution of India. However, the Supreme Court of India has stated that the appointment of deputy chief ministers is not unconstitutional. The court has clarified that a deputy chief minister, for all practical purposes, remains a minister in the council of ministers headed by the chief minister and does not draw a higher salary or perks compared to other ministers.During the absence of the chief minister, the deputy-chief minister may chair cabinet meetings and lead the assembly majority. Various deputy chief ministers have also taken the oath of secrecy in line with the one that chief minister takes. This oath has also sparked controversies.

== List ==
#	Portrait	Name	Constituency	Term of office			Chief Minister	Party
1		Mukesh Agnihotri	Haroli	11 December 2022	Incumbent	3 years, 270 days	Sukhvinder Singh Sukhu	Indian National Congress

== Statistics ==
List of deputy chief ministers by length of term

No.	Name	Party	Length of term	
No.	Name	Party	Longest continuous term	Total years of deputy chief ministership
1	Mukesh Agnihotri	INC	3 years, 270 days	3 years, 270 days
