= Sukhu ministry =

State cabinet of Himachal Pradesh, India since 2022

- 14th Council of Ministers of Himachal Pradesh
- Date formed: 11 December 2022

People and organisations
- Governor: Rajendra Arlekar (2022–2023); Shiv Pratap Shukla (2023–2026); Kavinder Gupta (2026–present)
- Chief Minister: Sukhvinder Singh Sukhu
- Deputy Chief Minister: Mukesh Agnihotri
- No. of ministers: 10 (excluding CM)
- Member parties: INC
- Status in legislature: Majority
- Opposition party: BJP
- Opposition leader: Jai Ram Thakur

History
- Election: 2022
- Legislature term: 5 years
- Predecessor: Jai Ram Thakur ministry

The Sukhvinder Singh Sukhu ministry is the state cabinet of Himachal Pradesh headed by present chief minister Sukhvinder Singh Sukhu of Himachal Pradesh. The oath taking ceremony of Sukhu was held in Shimla on 11 December 2022. Cabinet ministers took oath on 8 January 2023.

== History ==
=== Inauguration ===
On 8 December 2022, election results for the Himachal Pradesh Legislative Assembly were announced. The state continued its tradition of unseating the incumbent government, with the Indian National Congress obtaining a decisive victory winning 40 seats of the 68 in the hill state.

On 10 December 2022, the Congress party chose Sukhvinder Singh Sukhu to become the chief minister of Himachal Pradesh. He was sworn in as the CM of his state the day later, with Mukesh Agnihotri becoming deputy chief minister.

== Council of Ministers ==
=== Cabinet Ministers ===
Cabinet members
| Portfolio | Minister | Took office | Left office | Party |
|---|---|---|---|---|
| Chief Minister; Finance; General Administration; Home; Planning; Personnel; All other departments not allotted to any other Minister | Sukhvinder Singh Sukhu | 11 December 2022 | Incumbent | INC |
| Deputy Chief Minister; Jal Shakti; Transport; Language, Arts & Culture; Cooperation | Mukesh Agnihotri | 11 December 2022 | Incumbent | INC |
| Minister of Health & Family Welfare; Minister of Social Justice & Empowerment; Minister of Sainik Welfare | Dhani Ram Shandil | 8 January 2023 | Incumbent | INC |
| Minister of Agriculture; Minister of Animal Husbandry | Chander Kumar | 8 January 2023 | Incumbent | INC |
| Minister of Industries; Minister of Parliamentary Affairs; Minister of Labour & Employment | Harshwardhan Chauhan | 8 January 2023 | Incumbent | INC |
| Minister of Revenue; Minister of Horticulture; Minister of Tribal Development; Minister of Redressal of Public Grievances | Jagat Singh Negi | 8 January 2023 | Incumbent | INC |
| Minister of Higher Education & Elementary Education; Minister of Printing & Stationery | Rohit Thakur | 8 January 2023 | Incumbent | INC |
| Minister of Rural Development & Panchayati Raj | Anirudh Singh | 8 January 2023 | Incumbent | INC |
| Minister of Public Works; Minister of Urban Development | Vikramaditya Singh | 8 January 2023 | Incumbent | INC |
| Minister of Technical Education; Minister of Vocational & Industrial Training; Minister of Town & Country Planning; Minister of Housing | Rajesh Dharmani | 12 December 2023 | Incumbent | INC |
| Minister of Ayush; Minister of Youth Services & Sports; Minister of Law & Legal Remembrance | Yadvinder Goma | 12 December 2023 | Incumbent | INC |

=== Chief Parliamentary Secretary ===
| Portfolio | Name | Took office | Left office | Party |
|---|---|---|---|---|
| Urban Development Higher Education Elementary Education | Ashish Butail | 8 January 2023 | Incumbent | Indian National Congress |
| Agriculture For Animal Husbandry Rural Development Panchayati Raj | Kishori Lal | 8 January 2023 | Incumbent | Indian National Congress |
| Law Department Parliamentary Affairs Department Horticulture Department | Mohan Lal Brakta | 8 January 2023 | Incumbent | Indian National Congress |
| TCP Department Industries Department Revenue Department | Ram Kumar Chaudhary | 8 January 2023 | Incumbent | Indian National Congress |
| Information & Public Relations Department Health Family Welfare Department Public Works Department | Sanjay Awasthy | 8 January 2023 | Incumbent | Indian National Congress |
| Power Department Tourism Department Forest Department Transport Department | Sunder Singh Thakur | 8 January 2023 | Incumbent | Indian National Congress |

== Demographics ==
Representation of ministers by district
1. Chamba (0.00%)
2. Kangra (23.0%)
3. Lahaul and Spiti (0.00%)
4. Kullu (6.00%)
5. Mandi (0.00%)
6. Hamirpur (6.00%)
7. Bilaspur (6.00%)
8. Solan (18.0%)
9. Sirmaur (6.00%)
10. Shimla (23.0%)
11. Kinnaur (6.00%)
12. Una (6.00%)

| District | Number of Ministers & Chief Parliamentary Secretaries | Name of Minister s & Chief Parliamentary Secretaries |
|---|---|---|
| Chamba | 0/5 | |
| Kangra | 4/14 | Chander Kumar, Yadvinder Goma, Ashish Butail, Kishori Lal |
| Lahaul and Spiti | 0/1 | |
| Kullu | 1/4 | Sunder Singh Thakur |
| Mandi | 0/9 | |
| Hamirpur | 1/5 | Sukhvinder Singh Sukhu |
| Una | 1/5 | Mukesh Agnihotri |
| Bilaspur | 1/4 | Rajesh Dharmani |
| Solan | 3/5 | Sanjay Awasthy, Ram Kumar Chaudhary, Dhani Ram Shandil |
| Sirmaur | 1/5 | Harshwardhan Chauhan |
| Shimla | 4/8 | Anirudh Singh, Vikramaditya Singh, Rohit Thakur, Mohan Lal Brakta |
| Kinnaur | 1/1 | Jagat Singh Negi |
