= Arki Assembly constituency =

Legislative Assembly constituency in Himachal Pradesh State, India

Coordinates: 31.15°N 76.97°E

Arki
- Constituency No. 50 for the Himachal Pradesh Legislative Assembly

Constituency details
- Country: India
- Region: North India
- State: Himachal Pradesh
- District: Solan
- Lok Sabha constituency: Shimla
- Established: 1967
- Total electors: 95,788
- Reservation: None

Member of Legislative Assembly
- 14th Himachal Pradesh Legislative Assembly
- Incumbent Sanjay Awasthy
- Party: Indian National Congress
- Elected year: 2022

Arki Assembly constituency is one of the 68 constituencies in the Himachal Pradesh Legislative Assembly of Himachal Pradesh, a northern state of India. Arki forms part of the Shimla Lok Sabha constituency.

== Members of the Legislative Assembly ==
Year	Member	Picture	Party
1967	Hira Singh Pal		Independent
1972	Hira Singh Pal		Lok Raj Party Himachal Pradesh
1977	Nagin Chander Pal		Janata Party
1982	Nagin Chander Pal		Bharatiya Janata Party
1985	Hira Singh Pal		Indian National Congress
1990	Nagin Chander Pal		Bharatiya Janata Party
1993	Dharam Pal Thakur		Indian National Congress
1998	Dharam Pal Thakur		Indian National Congress
2003	Dharam Pal Thakur		Indian National Congress
2007	Govind Ram Sharma		Bharatiya Janata Party
2012	Govind Ram Sharma		Bharatiya Janata Party
2017	Virbhadra Singh		Indian National Congress
2021^	Sanjay Awasthy		Indian National Congress
2022	Sanjay Awasthy		Indian National Congress

^By poll

== Election results ==
=== Assembly Election 2022 ===
2022 Himachal Pradesh Legislative Assembly election: Arki
Party	Candidate	Votes	%	±%
INC	Sanjay	30,897	42.02%	▼8.85
Independent	Rajender	26,075	35.46%	New
BJP	Govind Ram	13,444	18.28%	▼27.27
Rashtriya Devbhumi Party	Jai Dev Singh	1,747	2.38%	New
NOTA	Nota	466	0.63%	▼2.05
AAP	Jeet Ram	316	0.43%	New
BSP	Kamlesh	306	0.42%	New
Independent	Sanjay Kumar	285	0.39%	New
Margin of victory		4,822	6.56%	▲1.24
Turnout		73,536	76.77%	▲11.39
Registered electors		95,788		▲3.43
INC hold		Swing	▼8.85	

=== Assembly By-election 2021 ===
The sitting MLA, Virbhadra Singh died on 8 July 2021. The Election Commission of India announced that by-elections for the vacant constituencies would be done on 30 October 2021.

2021 Himachal Pradesh Legislative Assembly by-election: Arki
Party	Candidate	Votes	%	±%
INC	Sanjay	30,798	50.86%	▼2.40
BJP	Rattan Singh Pal	27,579	45.55%	▲1.62
NOTA	Nota	1,626	2.69%	New
Independent	Jeet Ram	547	0.90%	New
Margin of victory		3,219	5.32%	▼4.03
Turnout		60,550	64.65%	▼10.82
Registered electors		92,609		▲8.97
INC hold		Swing	▼2.40	

=== Assembly Election 2017 ===
2017 Himachal Pradesh Legislative Assembly election: Arki
Party	Candidate	Votes	%	±%
INC	Virbhadra Singh	34,499	53.27%	▲26.83
BJP	Rattan Singh Pal	28,448	43.92%	▲13.86
NOTA	None of the Above	530	0.82%	New
Janral Samaj Party	Vijay Singh Rajput	445	0.69%	New
Margin of victory		6,051	9.34%	▲5.72
Turnout		64,765	76.21%	▲2.74
Registered electors		84,987		▲9.06
INC gain from BJP		Swing	▲23.20	

=== Assembly Election 2012 ===
2012 Himachal Pradesh Legislative Assembly election: Arki
Party	Candidate	Votes	%	±%
BJP	Govind Ram	17,211	30.06%	▼15.59
INC	Sanjay	15,136	26.44%	▲10.11
Independent	Amar Chand Pal	10,477	18.30%	New
NCP	Bhagat Singh Bahlwal	7,515	13.13%	New
CPI(M)	Ram Krishan	2,981	5.21%	▲2.55
Independent	Ahsa Parihar	1,754	3.06%	New
BSP	Gurdas Ram	575	1.00%	▲0.14
Independent	Vijay Singh Chauhan	456	0.80%	New
Independent	Pawan Kumar	430	0.75%	New
Himachal Swabhiman Party	Brij Lal	413	0.72%	New
Margin of victory		2,075	3.62%	▼10.80
Turnout		57,247	73.46%	▼2.34
Registered electors		77,927		▲27.41
BJP hold		Swing	▼15.59	

=== Assembly Election 2007 ===
2007 Himachal Pradesh Legislative Assembly election: Arki
Party	Candidate	Votes	%	±%
BJP	Gobind Ram	21,168	45.66%	▲8.22
Independent	Dharam Pal Thakur	14,481	31.23%	New
INC	Parkash Chand	7,569	16.33%	▼23.73
CPI(M)	Ram Krishan	1,233	2.66%	New
Independent	Vijay Singh Chauhan	636	1.37%	New
CPI	Deep Chand Sharma	500	1.08%	New
BSP	Gomti Devi	401	0.86%	New
Margin of victory		6,687	14.42%	▲11.80
Turnout		46,364	75.81%	▲4.42
Registered electors		61,161		▲9.77
BJP gain from INC		Swing	▲5.60	

=== Assembly Election 2003 ===
2003 Himachal Pradesh Legislative Assembly election: Arki
Party	Candidate	Votes	%	±%
INC	Dharam Pal Thakur	15,933	40.06%	▼1.90
BJP	Govind Ram	14,890	37.43%	▼2.83
Independent	Gurdas Ram	3,694	9.29%	New
HVC	Vishal Sharma	1,205	3.03%	▼8.25
Independent	Ram Chand Pal	1,069	2.69%	New
Independent	Surat Ram	938	2.36%	New
Independent	Kailash Chand Bhargav	501	1.26%	New
Independent	Jeet Ram	440	1.11%	New
Independent	Virender Sharma	404	1.02%	New
SP	Kanta Chandel	206	0.52%	New
Independent	Vijay Singh Chauhan	203	0.51%	New
Margin of victory		1,043	2.62%	▲0.93
Turnout		39,777	71.42%	▲1.30
Registered electors		55,717		▲14.37
INC hold		Swing	▼1.90	

=== Assembly Election 1998 ===
1998 Himachal Pradesh Legislative Assembly election: Arki
Party	Candidate	Votes	%	±%
INC	Dharam Pal Thakur	14,327	41.96%	▼17.25
BJP	Nagin Chandra Pal	13,749	40.26%	▲0.91
HVC	Inder Singh Thakur	3,850	11.27%	New
CPI(M)	Ram Krishan	2,044	5.99%	New
JD	Sant Ram	177	0.52%	New
Margin of victory		578	1.69%	▼18.16
Turnout		34,147	71.04%	▲2.16
Registered electors		48,716		▲14.75
INC hold		Swing	▼17.25	

=== Assembly Election 1993 ===
1993 Himachal Pradesh Legislative Assembly election: Arki
Party	Candidate	Votes	%	±%
INC	Dharam Pal Thakur	17,077	59.21%	▲40.15
BJP	Nagin Chander Pal	11,350	39.35%	▼27.88
Doordarshi Party	Devender Sharma	170	0.59%	New
Margin of victory		5,727	19.86%	▼28.32
Turnout		28,842	68.62%	▲8.67
Registered electors		42,454		▲10.22
INC gain from BJP		Swing		

=== Assembly Election 1990 ===
1990 Himachal Pradesh Legislative Assembly election: Arki
Party	Candidate	Votes	%	±%
BJP	Nagin Chander Pal	15,350	67.24%	▲34.21
INC	Amar Chand Pal	4,352	19.06%	▼43.61
Independent	Amar Singh Thakur	1,018	4.46%	New
Independent	Balak Ram Thakur	857	3.75%	New
CPI	Harish Kaushal	685	3.00%	▼0.99
BSP	Sant Ram	327	1.43%	New
Margin of victory		10,998	48.17%	▲18.52
Turnout		22,830	59.77%	▼12.52
Registered electors		38,518		▲27.86
BJP gain from INC		Swing	▲4.56	

=== Assembly Election 1985 ===
1985 Himachal Pradesh Legislative Assembly election: Arki
Party	Candidate	Votes	%	±%
INC	Hira Singh Pal	13,554	62.67%	▲30.37
BJP	Nagin Chander Pal	7,142	33.03%	▼10.23
CPI	Harish Chander	862	3.99%	New
Margin of victory		6,412	29.65%	▲18.70
Turnout		21,626	72.50%	▲0.52
Registered electors		30,124		▲5.98
INC gain from BJP		Swing	▲19.41	

=== Assembly Election 1982 ===
1982 Himachal Pradesh Legislative Assembly election: Arki
Party	Candidate	Votes	%	±%
BJP	Nagin Chander Pal	8,764	43.26%	New
INC	Hira Singh	6,545	32.31%	New
Independent	Hari Dass	4,291	21.18%	New
JP	Rajinder Kumar	418	2.06%	▼74.81
LKD	Bala Ram	169	0.83%	New
Margin of victory		2,219	10.95%	▼47.30
Turnout		20,259	72.26%	▲14.33
Registered electors		28,424		▲13.37
BJP gain from JP		Swing	▼33.61	

=== Assembly Election 1977 ===
1977 Himachal Pradesh Legislative Assembly election: Arki
Party	Candidate	Votes	%	±%
JP	Nagin Chandra Pal	10,976	76.87%	New
CPI	Kameshwar Pandit	2,659	18.62%	▲3.47
Independent	Kanshi Ram	643	4.50%	New
Margin of victory		8,317	58.25%	▲53.05
Turnout		14,278	57.45%	▲7.80
Registered electors		25,072		▲5.11
JP gain from LRP		Swing	▲43.81	

=== Assembly Election 1972 ===
1972 Himachal Pradesh Legislative Assembly election: Arki
Party	Candidate	Votes	%	±%
LRP	Hira Singh Pal	3,876	33.06%	New
INC	Bali Ram Thakur	3,266	27.86%	▲2.18
INC(O)	Hari Dass	2,199	18.76%	New
CPI	Kameshwar Pandit	1,777	15.16%	New
Independent	Karam Chand	606	5.17%	New
Margin of victory		610	5.20%	▼43.43
Turnout		11,724	50.34%	▼15.07
Registered electors		23,853		▼3.34
LRP gain from Independent		Swing	▼41.26	

=== Assembly Election 1967 ===
1967 Himachal Pradesh Legislative Assembly election: Arki
Party	Candidate	Votes	%	±%
Independent	Hira Singh Pal	11,778	74.32%	New
INC	H. Dass	4,070	25.68%	New
Margin of victory		7,708	48.64%	
Turnout		15,848	66.18%	
Registered electors		24,678		
Independent win (new seat)				

== See also ==
- Solan district
- List of constituencies of Himachal Pradesh Legislative Assembly
- Arki Fort
