= Pragpur Assembly constituency =

Former Legislative Assembly constituency in Himachal Pradesh, India

Coordinates: 30.44°N 77.59°E

Pragpur
- Former constituency for the Himachal Pradesh Legislative Assembly

Constituency details
- Country: India
- Region: North India
- State: Himachal Pradesh
- District: Kangra
- Lok Sabha constituency: Kangra
- Established: 1972
- Abolished: 2008
- Reservation: SC

Pragpur was one of the 68 constituencies in the Himachal Pradesh Legislative Assembly of Himachal Pradesh a northern state of India. It was in Kangra district and was a part of Kangra Lok Sabha constituency.

== Members of the Legislative Assembly ==
Year	Member	Party
1977	Yog Raj	Janata Party
1982	Virender Kumar	Bharatiya Janata Party
1985	Yog Raj	Indian National Congress
1990	Virender Kumar	Bharatiya Janata Party
1993	Virender Kumar	Bharatiya Janata Party
1998	Virender Kumar	Bharatiya Janata Party
2003	Naveen Dhiman	Independent politician
2007	Yog Raj	Indian National Congress

== Election results ==
=== Assembly Election 2007 ===
2007 Himachal Pradesh Legislative Assembly election: Pragpur
Party	Candidate	Votes	%	±%
INC	Yog Raj	21,253	49.09%	▲35.14
BJP	Naveen Dhiman	20,911	48.30%	▲41.79
BSP	Rajinder Kumar	1,091	2.52%	New
Margin of victory		342	0.79%	▼9.46
Turnout		43,291	68.22%	▼4.16
Registered electors		63,459		▲11.44
INC gain from Independent		Swing		

=== Assembly Election 2003 ===
2003 Himachal Pradesh Legislative Assembly election: Pragpur
Party	Candidate	Votes	%	±%
Independent	Naveen Dhiman	16,585	40.24%	New
Independent	Yog Raj	12,359	29.99%	New
INC	Pardeep Kumar	5,749	13.95%	▼32.51
BJP	Anita Kumari Sandal	2,683	6.51%	▼43.59
HVC	Pritam Chand Sheria	2,656	6.44%	▲3.63
LJP	Surinder Pal Singh	720	1.75%	New
Independent	Baldev Raj	463	1.12%	New
Margin of victory		4,226	10.25%	▲6.61
Turnout		41,215	72.38%	▲0.31
Registered electors		56,945		▲17.40
Independent gain from BJP		Swing	▼9.86	

=== Assembly Election 1998 ===
1998 Himachal Pradesh Legislative Assembly election: Pragpur
Party	Candidate	Votes	%	±%
BJP	Virender Kumar	17,513	50.10%	▲7.53
INC	Yog Raj	16,241	46.46%	▲29.29
HVC	Gurdas Ram	983	2.81%	New
BSP	Harnam Singh	218	0.62%	▼1.56
Margin of victory		1,272	3.64%	▼1.70
Turnout		34,955	72.81%	▲0.13
Registered electors		48,506		▲8.54
BJP hold		Swing	▲7.53	

=== Assembly Election 1993 ===
1993 Himachal Pradesh Legislative Assembly election: Pragpur
Party	Candidate	Votes	%	±%
BJP	Virender Kumar	13,685	42.57%	▼20.47
Independent	Yog Raj	11,968	37.23%	New
INC	Pritam Chand Sheria	5,520	17.17%	▼18.28
BSP	Dalip Kumar	702	2.18%	New
Margin of victory		1,717	5.34%	▼22.25
Turnout		32,148	72.44%	▼1.64
Registered electors		44,691		▲2.62
BJP hold		Swing	▼20.47	

=== Assembly Election 1990 ===
1990 Himachal Pradesh Legislative Assembly election: Pragpur
Party	Candidate	Votes	%	±%
BJP	Virender Kumar	20,197	63.04%	▲16.65
INC	Yog Raj	11,359	35.45%	▼14.00
Margin of victory		8,838	27.59%	▲24.52
Turnout		32,038	74.30%	▼0.03
Registered electors		43,548		▲29.17
BJP gain from INC		Swing		

=== Assembly Election 1985 ===
1985 Himachal Pradesh Legislative Assembly election: Pragpur
Party	Candidate	Votes	%	±%
INC	Yog Raj	12,272	49.46%	▲25.94
BJP	Varinder Kumar	11,512	46.40%	▲5.36
Independent	Dalip Singh	1,029	4.15%	New
Margin of victory		760	3.06%	▼4.66
Turnout		24,813	74.34%	▲0.58
Registered electors		33,713		▲9.33
INC gain from BJP		Swing		

=== Assembly Election 1982 ===
1982 Himachal Pradesh Legislative Assembly election: Pragpur
Party	Candidate	Votes	%	±%
BJP	Virender Kumar	9,241	41.04%	New
Independent	Yog Raj	7,503	33.32%	New
INC	Dalip Singh	5,296	23.52%	▼10.24
JP	Ramesh Chand	167	0.74%	▼65.50
Independent	Chand Kumar	152	0.68%	New
Margin of victory		1,738	7.72%	▼24.76
Turnout		22,518	74.05%	▲24.47
Registered electors		30,836		▲0.37
BJP gain from JP		Swing	▼25.20	

=== Assembly Election 1977 ===
1977 Himachal Pradesh Legislative Assembly election: Pragpur
Party	Candidate	Votes	%	±%
JP	Yog Raj	9,881	66.24%	New
INC	Dalip Singh	5,036	33.76%	New
Margin of victory		4,845	32.48%	
Turnout		14,917	49.48%	
Registered electors		30,721		
JP win (new seat)				
