= Churah Assembly constituency =

Legislative Assembly constituency in Himachal Pradesh State, India

Coordinates: 32.85°N 76.17°E

Churah
- Constituency No. 1 for the Himachal Pradesh Legislative Assembly

Constituency details
- Country: India
- Region: North India
- State: Himachal Pradesh
- District: Chamba
- Lok Sabha constituency: Kangra
- Established: 1951 (first establishment), 2008 (second establishment)
- Total electors: 78,823
- Reservation: SC

Member of Legislative Assembly
- 14th Himachal Pradesh Legislative Assembly
- Incumbent Hans Raj
- Party: Bharatiya Janata Party
- Elected year: 2022

Churah is one of the 68 constituencies of the Himachal Pradesh Vidhan Sabha. This constituency is reserved for the candidates to Scheduled castes. It came into existence for the second time in 2008, following the delimitation of the Legislative Assembly constituencies and covers most of the area covered by the erstwhile Rajnagar constituency.

== Overview ==
Churah (constituency number 1) is one of the five Vidhan Sabha constituencies located in Chamba district. It covers the entire Churah tehsil and Rajnagar Kanungo Circle of Chamba tehsil. It is part of Kangra Lok Sabha constituency along with 16 other Assembly segments, namely, Chamba, Dalhousie, Bhattiyat, Nurpur, Indora, Fatehpur, Jawali, Jwalamukhi, Jaisinghpur, Sullah, Nagrota, Kangra, Shahpur, Dharamshala, Palampur and Baijnath, Sihunta.

== Members of the Legislative Assembly ==
Year	Member	Picture	Party
1951	Vidya Dhar		Indian National Congress
1951	Awatar Chand		Indian National Congress
2012	Hans Raj		Bharatiya Janata Party
2017	Hans Raj		Bharatiya Janata Party
2022	Hans Raj		Bharatiya Janata Party

== Election results ==
=== Assembly Election 2022 ===
2022 Himachal Pradesh Legislative Assembly election: Churah
Party	Candidate	Votes	%	±%
BJP	Hans Raj	32,095	51.49%	▼0.90
INC	Yashwant Singh	29,453	47.26%	▲4.02
NOTA	Nota	394	0.63%	▼0.30
AAP	Nand Kumar Jaryal	385	0.62%	New
Margin of victory		2,642	4.24%	▼4.92
Turnout		62,327	79.07%	▲0.37
Registered electors		78,823		▲14.86
BJP hold		Swing	▼0.90	

=== Assembly Election 2017 ===
2017 Himachal Pradesh Legislative Assembly election: Churah
Party	Candidate	Votes	%	±%
BJP	Hans Raj	28,293	52.39%	▲1.00
INC	Surender Bhardwaj	23,349	43.23%	▼3.61
NOTA	None of the Above	505	0.94%	New
SP	Nand Kumar	442	0.82%	New
Independent	Des Raj	425	0.79%	New
Margin of victory		4,944	9.15%	▲4.61
Turnout		54,005	78.70%	▼0.83
Registered electors		68,623		▲12.28
BJP hold		Swing	▲1.00	

=== Assembly Election 2012 ===
2012 Himachal Pradesh Legislative Assembly election: Churah
Party	Candidate	Votes	%	±%
BJP	Hans Raj	24,978	51.39%	New
INC	Surender Bhardwaj	22,767	46.84%	▲15.36
BSP	Kishan Chand	799	1.64%	New
Margin of victory		2,211	4.55%	▼0.29
Turnout		48,606	79.53%	▲40.83
Registered electors		61,120		▲109.42
BJP gain from INC		Swing		

=== Assembly Election 1952 ===
1952 Himachal Pradesh Legislative Assembly election: Churah
Party	Candidate	Votes	%	±%
INC	Avtar Chand	3,555	31.48%	New
INC	Vidya Dhar	3,009	26.64%	New
Independent	Gulab Singh	1,921	17.01%	New
KMPP	Desh Raj	1,411	12.49%	New
KMPP	Narain Dass	720	6.38%	New
ABJS	Sansar Chand	475	4.21%	New
Independent	Tej Ram	203	1.80%	New
Margin of victory		546	4.83%	
Turnout		11,294	38.70%	
Registered electors		29,186		
INC win (new seat)				

== See also ==
- List of constituencies of the Himachal Pradesh Legislative Assembly
- Chamba district
