= Chachiot =

Coordinates: 31.55°N 77.01°E

Chachiot is a former Vidhan Sabha constituency and a tehsil in Mandi District of Himachal Pradesh, India.
