= Seraj Assembly constituency =

Legislative Assembly constituency in Himachal Pradesh State, India

Coordinates: 31.6°N 77.3°E

Seraj
- Constituency No. 29 for the Himachal Pradesh Legislative Assembly

Constituency details
- Country: India
- Region: North India
- State: Himachal Pradesh
- District: Mandi
- Lok Sabha constituency: Mandi
- Established: 2008
- Total electors: 84,315
- Reservation: None

Member of Legislative Assembly
- 14th Himachal Pradesh Legislative Assembly
- Incumbent Jai Ram Thakur
- Party: Bharatiya Janata Party
- Elected year: 2022

Seraj Assembly constituency is one of the 68 constituencies in the Himachal Pradesh Legislative Assembly of Himachal Pradesh a northern state of India. Seraj is also part of Mandi Lok Sabha constituency.

== Member of Legislative Assembly ==
| Year | Member | Picture | Party |
|---|---|---|---|
| 2012 | Jai Ram Thakur | | Bharatiya Janata Party |
| 2017 | Jai Ram Thakur | | Bharatiya Janata Party |
| 2022 | Jai Ram Thakur | | Bharatiya Janata Party |

== Election results ==
=== Assembly Election 2022 ===
2022 Himachal Pradesh Legislative Assembly election: Seraj
| Party | Candidate | Votes | % | ±% |
|---|---|---|---|---|
| BJP | Jai Ram Thakur | 53,562 | 75.70% | ▲20.12 |
| INC | Chet Ram | 15,379 | 21.74% | ▼16.24 |
| CPI(M) | Mahender Rana | 818 | 1.16% | New |
| AAP | Gita Nand | 339 | 0.48% | New |
| NOTA | Nota | 292 | 0.41% | ▼0.18 |
| BSP | Indra Devi | 264 | 0.37% | ▼0.15 |
| Independent | Narender Kumar | 98 | 0.14% | New |
| Margin of victory | | 38,183 | 53.97% | ▲36.36 |
| Turnout | | 70,752 | 83.91% | ▼1.49 |
| Registered electors | | 84,315 | | ▲12.68 |
| BJP hold | | Swing | ▲20.12 | |

=== Assembly Election 2017 ===
2017 Himachal Pradesh Legislative Assembly election: Seraj
| Party | Candidate | Votes | % | ±% |
|---|---|---|---|---|
| BJP | Jai Ram Thakur | 35,519 | 55.59% | ▲2.32 |
| INC | Chet Ram | 24,265 | 37.97% | ▼5.36 |
| Independent | Dile Ram | 2,214 | 3.46% | New |
| Independent | Narender Kumar | 412 | 0.64% | New |
| NOTA | None of the Above | 378 | 0.59% | New |
| BSP | Sunder Lal | 332 | 0.52% | ▼0.79 |
| Margin of victory | | 11,254 | 17.61% | ▲7.68 |
| Turnout | | 63,900 | 85.40% | ▲0.21 |
| Registered electors | | 74,825 | | ▲10.11 |
| BJP hold | | Swing | ▲2.32 | |

=== Assembly Election 2012 ===
2012 Himachal Pradesh Legislative Assembly election: Seraj
| Party | Candidate | Votes | % | ±% |
|---|---|---|---|---|
| BJP | Jai Ram Thakur | 30,837 | 53.27% | New |
| INC | Tara Thakur | 25,085 | 43.33% | New |
| CPI(M) | Jagdish Kumar | 1,094 | 1.89% | New |
| BSP | Sunder Lal | 756 | 1.31% | New |
| Margin of victory | | 5,752 | 9.94% | |
| Turnout | | 57,890 | 85.19% | |
| Registered electors | | 67,952 | | |
| BJP win (new seat) | | | | |

== See also ==
- Seraj
- List of constituencies of Himachal Pradesh Legislative Assembly
