= List of constituencies of the Himachal Pradesh Legislative Assembly =

Himachal Pradesh Legislative Assembly
- 14th Legislative Assembly of Himachal Pradesh

Type
- Type: Unicameral
- Term limits: 5 years
- Seats: 68

Elections
- Voting system: First past the post
- Last election: November 2022
- Next election: November 2027

Meeting place
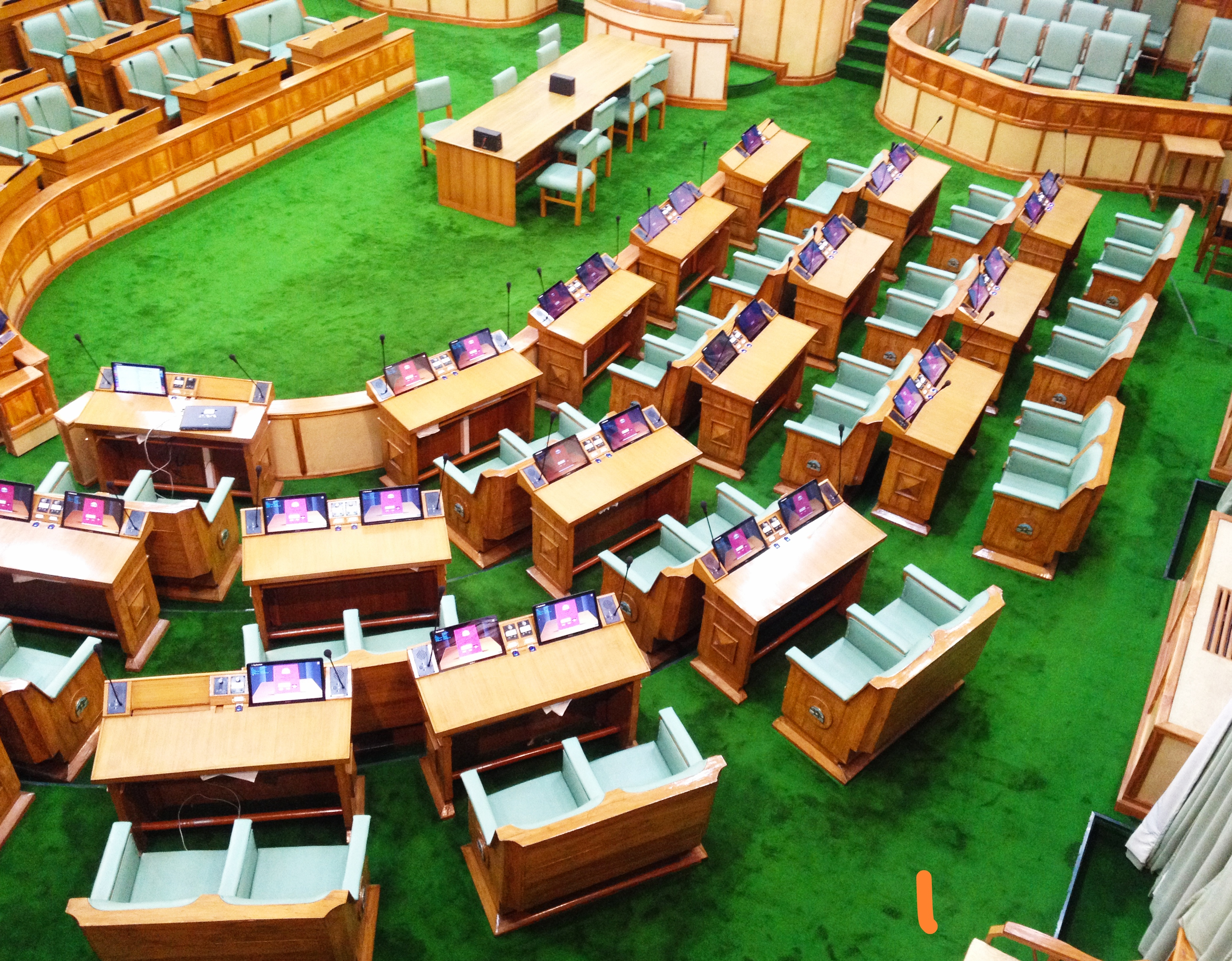
- Himachal Pradesh Legislative Assembly, Shimla, Himachal Pradesh, India

Website
- Himachal Pradesh Legislative Assembly

The Himachal Pradesh Legislative Assembly or the Himachal Pradesh Vidhan Sabha is the unicameral legislature of the Indian state of Himachal Pradesh in North India. The seat of the Legislative Assembly is in Annadale in the state's summer capital of Shimla. Himachal Pradesh Legislative Assembly consists of 68 members elected directly from single-seat constituencies using the first-past-the-post system. The present constituencies were established following the delimitation of parliamentary and assembly constituencies in 2008.

Since the independence of India, the Scheduled Tribes (ST) and the Scheduled Castes (SC) and have been given reservation status, guaranteeing political representation, and the Constitution lays down the general principles of positive discrimination for SCs and STs. In Himachal Pradesh, the Scheduled Tribes primarily include the Gaddis, Lahaula, Pangwala, Kinnauris, Bodh and other communities. Of the 68 constituencies, 17 are reserved for candidates belonging to the Scheduled Castes and three are reserved for candidates belonging to the Scheduled Tribes.

== Current constituencies ==
Constituencies of the Himachal Pradesh Legislative Assembly
#	Constituency name	Reserved for (SC/ST/None)	Electorate (2022)	District	Lok Sabha constituency
1	Churah	SC	75,468	Chamba	Kangra
2	Bharmour	ST	76,046	Chamba	Mandi
3	Chamba	None	81,594	Chamba	Kangra
4	Dalhousie	None	73,071	Chamba	Kangra
5	Bhattiyat	None	78,980	Chamba	Kangra
6	Nurpur	None	91,269	Kangra	Kangra
7	Indora	SC	91,569	Kangra	Kangra
8	Fatehpur	None	87,913	Kangra	Kangra
9	Jawali	None	99,572	Kangra	Kangra
10	Dehra	None	83,629	Kangra	Hamirpur
11	Jaswan-Pragpur	None	77,991	Kangra	Hamirpur
12	Jawalamukhi	None	78,144	Kangra	Kangra
13	Jaisinghpur	SC	84,018	Kangra	Kangra
14	Sullah	None	103,905	Kangra	Kangra
15	Nagrota	None	88,867	Kangra	Kangra
16	Kangra	None	81,583	Kangra	Kangra
17	Shahpur	None	87,723	Kangra	Kangra
18	Dharamshala	None	81,516	Kangra	Kangra
19	Palampur	None	75,481	Kangra	Kangra
20	Baijnath	SC	89,135	Kangra	Kangra
21	Lahaul and Spiti	ST	24,876	Lahaul and Spiti	Mandi
22	Manali	None	73,488	Kullu	Mandi
23	Kullu	None	89,600	Kullu	Mandi
24	Banjar	None	73,094	Kullu	Mandi
25	Anni	SC	85,643	Kullu	Mandi
26	Karsog	SC	74,909	Mandi	Mandi
27	Sundernagar		81,164	Mandi	Mandi
28	Nachan	SC	86,208	Mandi	Mandi
29	Seraj	None	81,843	Mandi	Mandi
30	Darang	None	89,086	Mandi	Mandi
31	Jogindernagar	None	98,341	Mandi	Mandi
32	Dharampur	None	79,958	Mandi	Hamirpur
33	Mandi	None	76,957	Mandi	Mandi
34	Balh	SC	79,587	Mandi	Mandi
35	Sarkaghat	None	90,837	Mandi	Mandi
36	Bhoranj	SC	81,134	Hamirpur	Hamirpur
37	Sujanpur	None	73,922	Hamirpur	Hamirpur
38	Hamirpur	None	74,861	Hamirpur	Hamirpur
39	Barsar	None	86,273	Hamirpur	Hamirpur
40	Nadaun	None	93,107	Hamirpur	Hamirpur
41	Chintpurni	SC	82,686	Una	Hamirpur
42	Gagret	None	82,774	Una	Hamirpur
43	Haroli	None	86,273	Una	Hamirpur
44	Una	None	85,254	Una	Hamirpur
45	Kutlehar	None	85,163	Una	Hamirpur
46	Jhanduta	SC	79,577	Bilaspur	Hamirpur
47	Ghumarwin	None	88,527	Bilaspur	Hamirpur
48	Bilaspur	None	83,025	Bilaspur	Hamirpur
49	Sri Naina Deviji	None	74,244	Bilaspur	Hamirpur
50	Arki	None	93,852	Solan	Shimla
51	Nalagarh	None	89,828	Solan	Shimla
52	Doon	None	68,266	Solan	Shimla
53	Solan	SC	85,238	Solan	Shimla
54	Kasauli	SC	67,434	Solan	Shimla
55	Pachhad	SC	76,475	Sirmaur	Shimla
56	Nahan	None	83,561	Sirmaur	Shimla
57	Sri Renukaji	SC	72,961	Sirmaur	Shimla
58	Paonta Sahib	None	82,487	Sirmaur	Shimla
59	Shillai	None	74,831	Sirmaur	Shimla
60	Chopal	None	79,109	Shimla	Shimla
61	Theog	None	83,275	Shimla	Shimla
62	Kasumpti	None	65,713	Shimla	Shimla
63	Shimla	None	48,071	Shimla	Shimla
64	Shimla Rural	None	76,267	Shimla	Shimla
65	Jubbal-Kotkhai	None	71,566	Shimla	Shimla
66	Rampur	SC	74,838	Shimla	Mandi
67	Rohru	SC	73,580	Shimla	Shimla
68	Kinnaur	ST	58,836	Kinnaur	Mandi

== Former constituencies ==
#	Name	Year of disestablishment
1	Bamsan	2008
2	Guler	2008
3	Banikhet	2008
4	Chachiot	2008
5	Kumarsain	2008
6	Thural	2008
7	Mewa	2008
8	Rajnagar	2008
9	Paonta Doon	2008
10	Gangath	2008
11	Jaswan	2008
12	Pragpur	2008
