= Jai Ram Thakur =

Indian politician (born 1965)

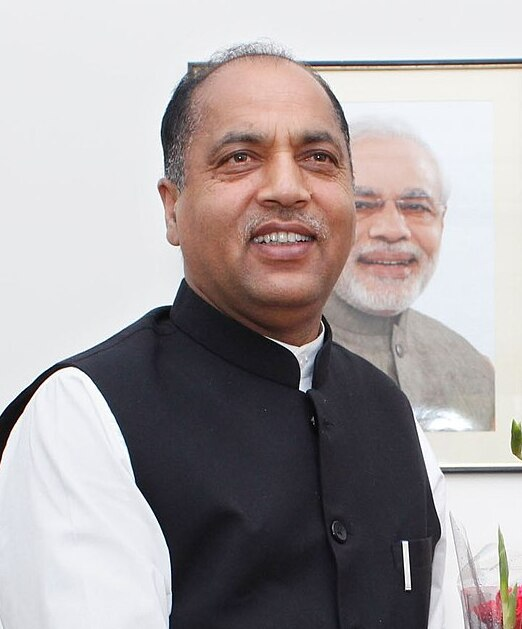
- Thakur in 2018

11th Leader of the Opposition Himachal Pradesh Legislative Assembly
- Incumbent
- Assumed office 25 December 2022
- Chief Minister: Sukhvinder Singh Sukhu
- Dy. Chief Minister: Mukesh Agnihotri
- Preceded by: Mukesh Agnihotri

6th Chief Minister of Himachal Pradesh
- In office 27 December 2017 – 11 December 2022
- Preceded by: Virbhadra Singh
- Succeeded by: Sukhvinder Singh Sukhu

Minister of Rural Development Government of Himachal Pradesh
- In office 9 July 2009 – 25 December 2012
- Chief Minister: Prem Kumar Dhumal

Member of Himachal Pradesh Legislative Assembly
- Incumbent
- Assumed office 2012
- Preceded by: Constituency established
- Constituency: Seraj
- In office 1998–2012
- Preceded by: Moti Ram
- Succeeded by: Constituency abolished
- Constituency: Chachiot

Personal details
- Born: 6 January 1965 (age 61) Mandi, Himachal Pradesh, India
- Party: Bharatiya Janata Party
- Spouse: Dr. Sadhana Thakur
- Children: 2 daughters
- Education: Vallabh Government College, Mandi; Panjab University, Chandigarh

Jai Ram Thakur (born 6 January 1965) is an Indian politician, and is the current leader of the opposition in Himachal Pradesh Legislative Assembly since 2022. He was earlier served as Chief Minister of state. He is serving his sixth term as MLA in the Himachal Pradesh Legislative Assembly, winning continuously since 1998 and has previously served as a Cabinet Minister in the Bharatiya Janata Party Government of Himachal Pradesh. Thakur was the Minister of Rural Development and Panchayati Raj from 2009 to 2012. He is elected to Himachal Pradesh Legislative Assembly from Seraj Assembly constituency of Mandi district. He won his first election in the year 1998 from now delimited constituency of Chachiot (Seraj).

== Early life and education ==
Jai Ram Thakur was born to a Rajput farming family in Village- Tandi, Tehsil- Thunag of Mandi; he was fourth among five siblings – two sisters and three brothers. His father's name is Jhethu Ram who used to work as mason and mother's name is Briku Devi.

Thakur who spent his childhood in acute poverty attained his primary education from Kurani School. Then he did graduation B.A. from Vallabh Government College, Mandi, (Graduated in 1987). Later he did Post Graduation (M.A.) from Panjab University, Chandigarh.

Thakur is married to ABVP colleague Dr. Sadhana Thakur and they have two daughters. Sadhana is a doctor, born to a Kannadiga family in Jaipur and brought up there. The couple has two daughters. Both daughters are studying MBBS in Himachal Pradesh. Elder is already studying in Dr. Rajendra Prasad Government Medical College, Tanda while younger also got selected to Dr. Rajendra Prasad Government Medical College, Tanda in the year 2018.

== Politics ==
He was introduced to the Akhil Bharatiya Vidyarthi Parishad during his graduation at Vallabh Government College Mandi, and won first election under the flag of ABVP, beginning his long association with the student organization. He remained Joint Secretary, State ABVP, 1986; Organizing Secretary, ABVP (J&K), 1989–93; State Secretary, Bharatiya Janata Yuva Morcha; 1993–95; President: State Bhartiya Janata Party Yuva Morcha, ii) B.J.P. District Mandi 2000–03; Vice President State BJP, 2003–05; and President State Bhartiya Janata Party 2006–09.

Elected to State Legislative Assembly in 1998, and re-elected in 2003 and 2007 from Chachiot Assembly Constituency which after the delimitation has been renamed as Seraj. Remained Chairman, General Development Committee & Education Committee; and vice-chairman, State Civil Supplies Corporation Ltd.

In the year 2009, he was inducted to the council of Ministers and given the portfolio of rural development and Panchayati raj. Also remained chairman, Rural Planning Committee and Member of various other House Committees before being inducted into Council of Minister as Panchayati Raj and Rural Development Minister on 09-07-2012.

Elected to the State Legislative Assembly for a consecutive fourth term in December 2012.

=== Chief Minister ===
In the 2017 Assembly elections, BJP won a two-thirds majority but its Chief Ministerial candidate Prem Kumar Dhumal received a shocking defeat from the Sujanpur assembly segment. Considering Jai Ram's strong RSS connections and strong political profile, he was the favorite for the top post and was chosen to lead the state. He chosen over Health minister J. P. Nadda He was the first to become Chief Minister from Mandi district and he served as the sixth Chief Minister of Himachal Pradesh. After BJP lost the 2022 legislative elections, Thakur resigned but was asked to continue in his post by the Governor until a new Chief Minister was selected. On 11 December, his successor Sukhvinder Singh Sukhu took oath as Chief Minister of Himachal Pradesh.

== Gallery ==
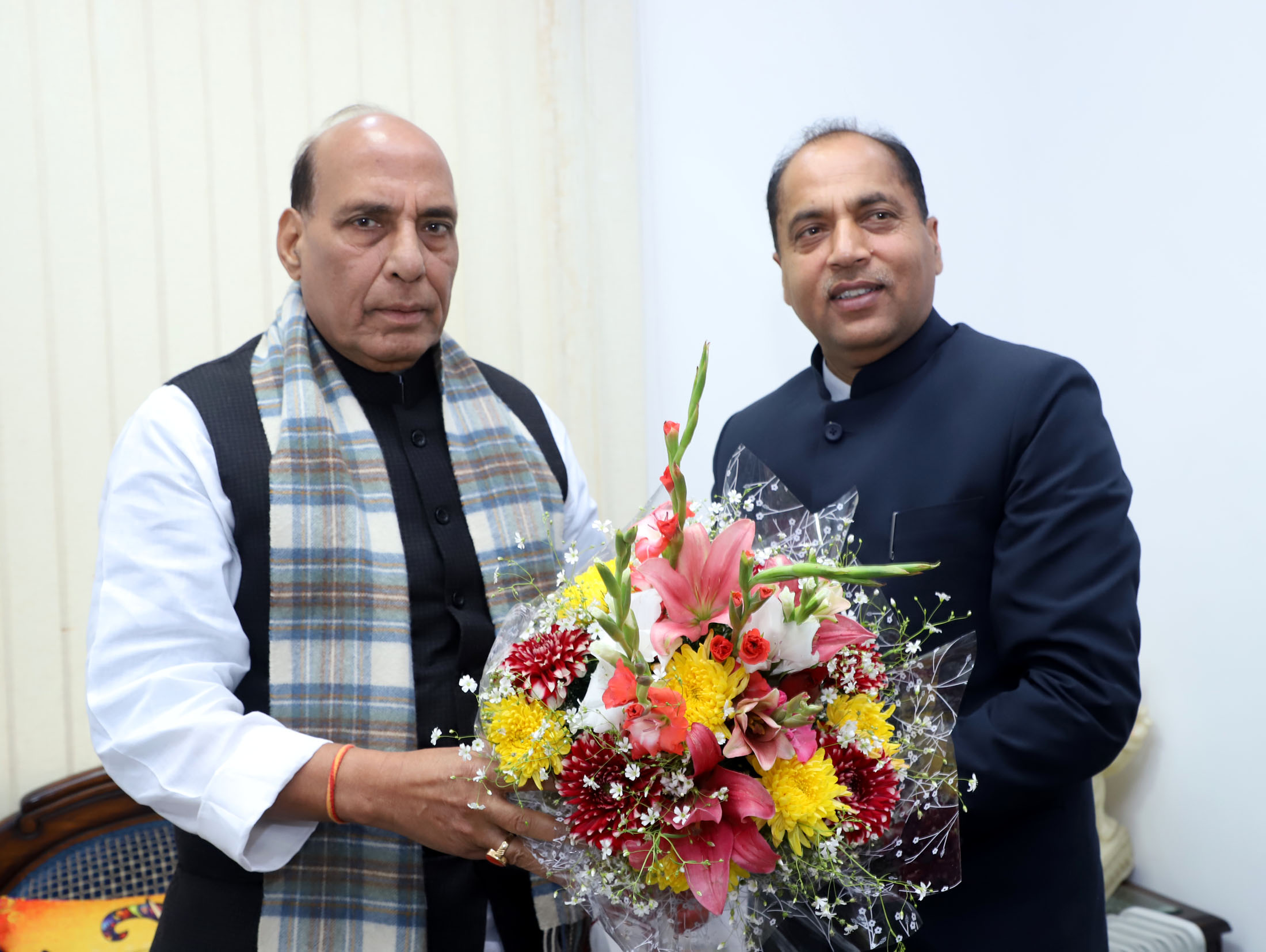
The Chief Minister of Himachal Pradesh, Shri Jai Ram Thakur calling on the Union Home Minister, Shri Rajnath Singh, in New Delhi on 27 January 2018

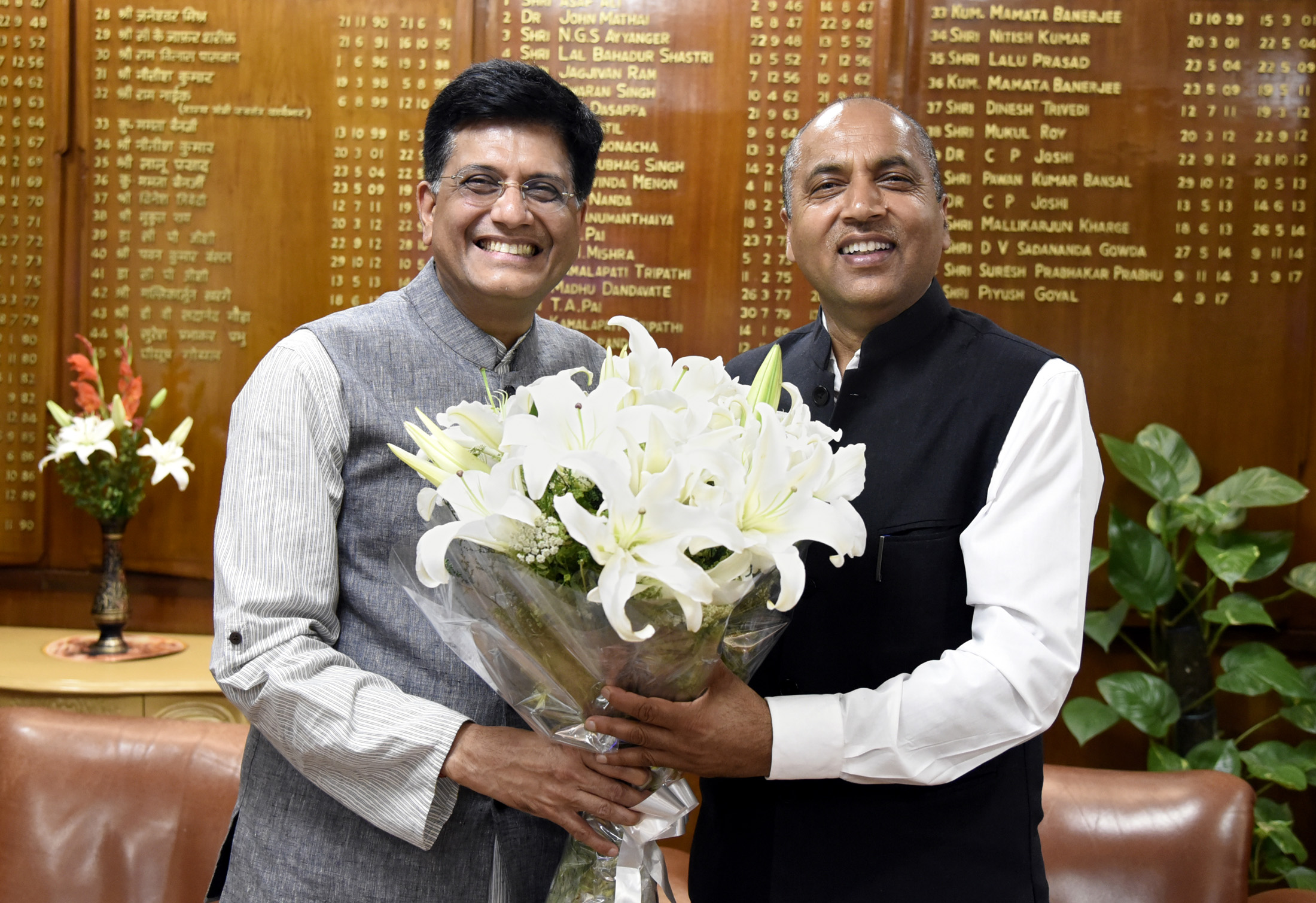
The Chief Minister of Himachal Pradesh, Shri Jai Ram Thakur calling on the Union Minister for Railways and Coal, Shri Piyush Goyal, in New Delhi on 2 May 2018

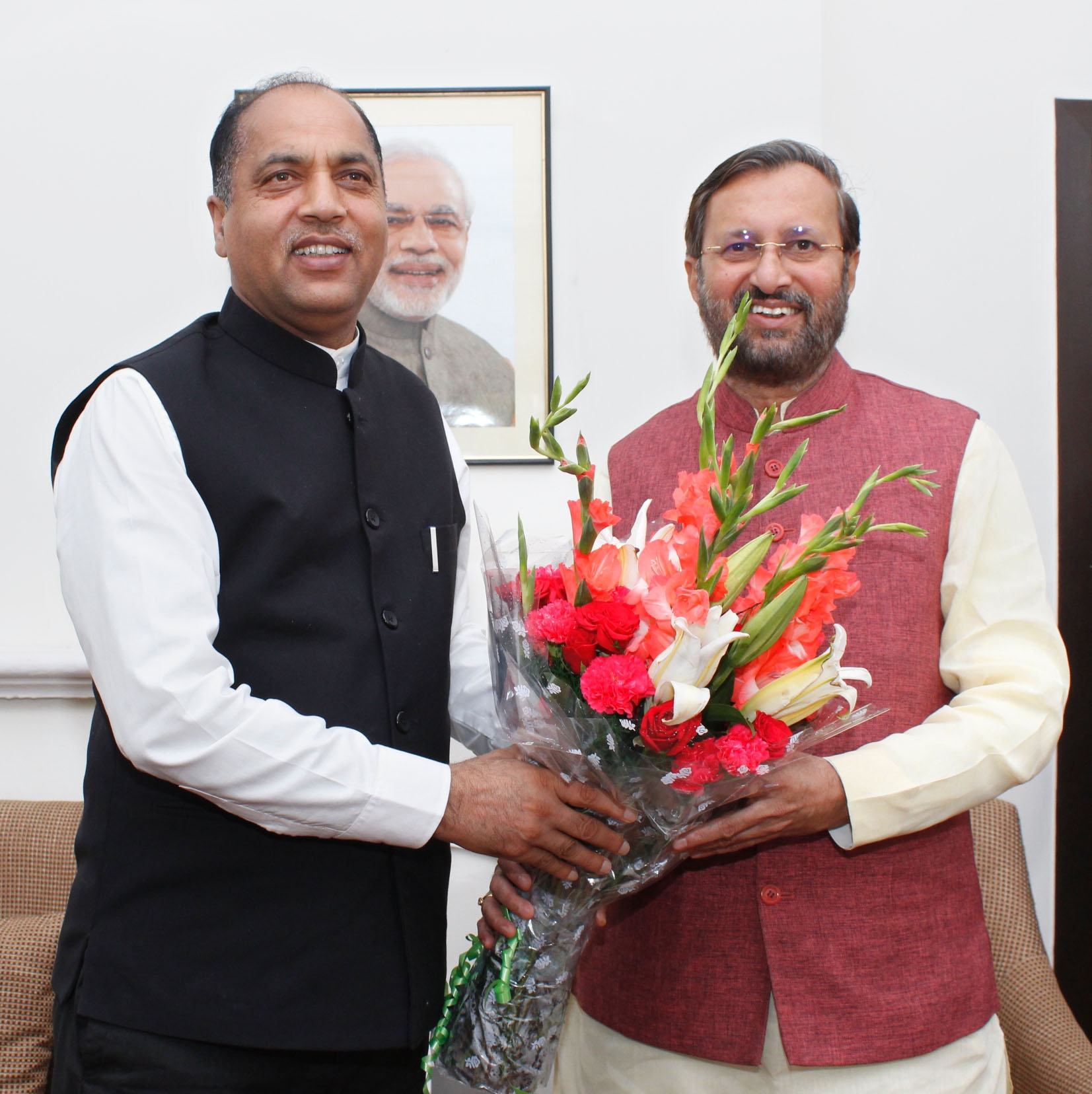
The Chief Minister of Himachal Pradesh, Shri Jai Ram Thakur calling on the Union Minister for Human Resource Development, Shri Prakash Javadekar, in New Delhi on 6 September 2018

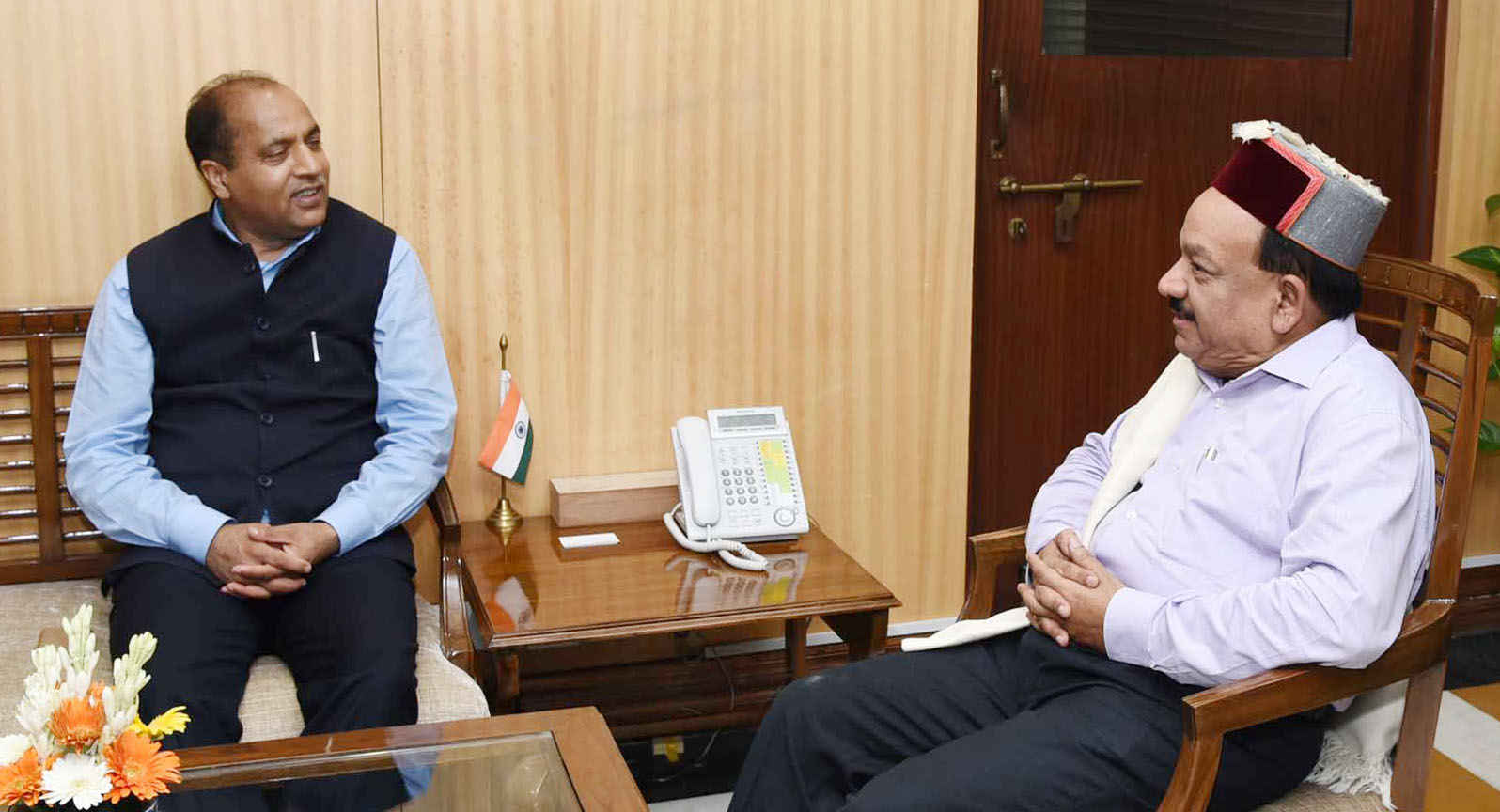
The Chief Minister of Himachal Pradesh, Shri Jai Ram Thakur meeting the Union Minister for Science & Technology, Earth Sciences and Environment, Forest & Climate Change, Dr. Harsh Vardhan, in New Delhi on 17 July 2018

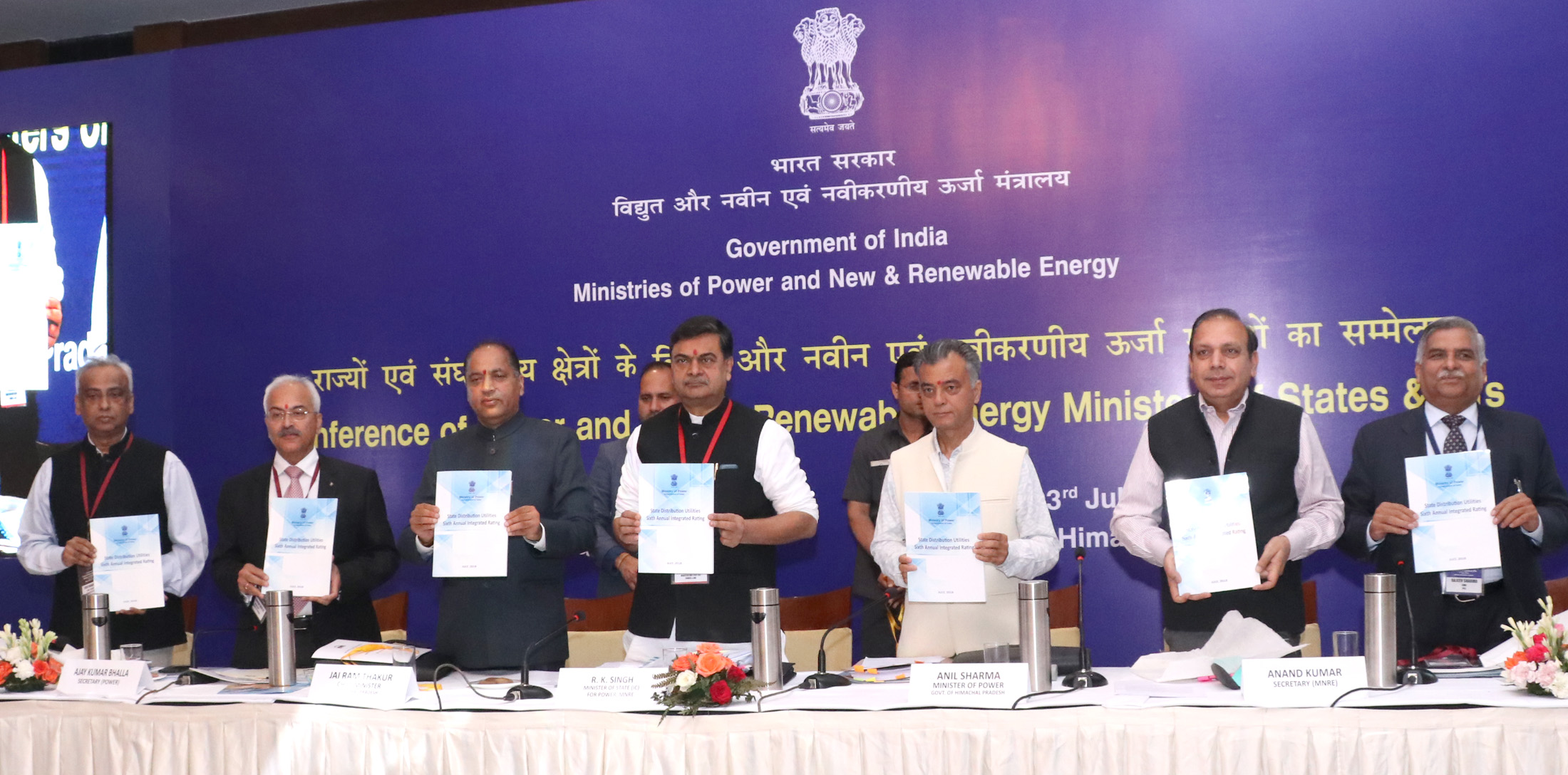
Raj Kumar Singh releasing the booklet “State Distribution Utilities - Sixth Annual Integrated Rating”, at the Conference of Power and New & Renewable Energy Ministers of States & UTs, in Shimla, Himachal Pradesh

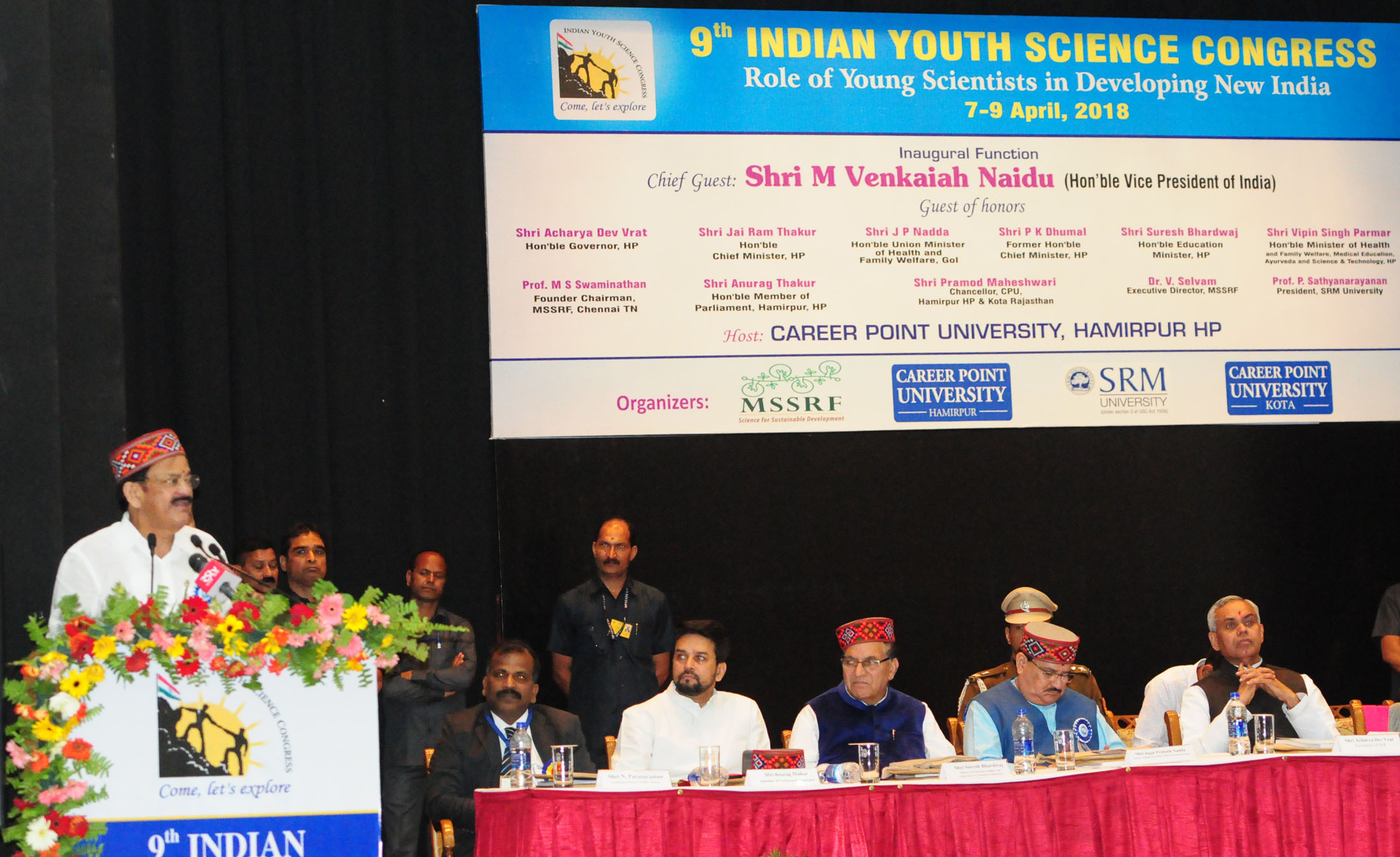
The Vice President, Shri M. Venkaiah Naidu addressing the ninth Indian Youth Science Congress, in Hamirpur, Himachal Pradesh

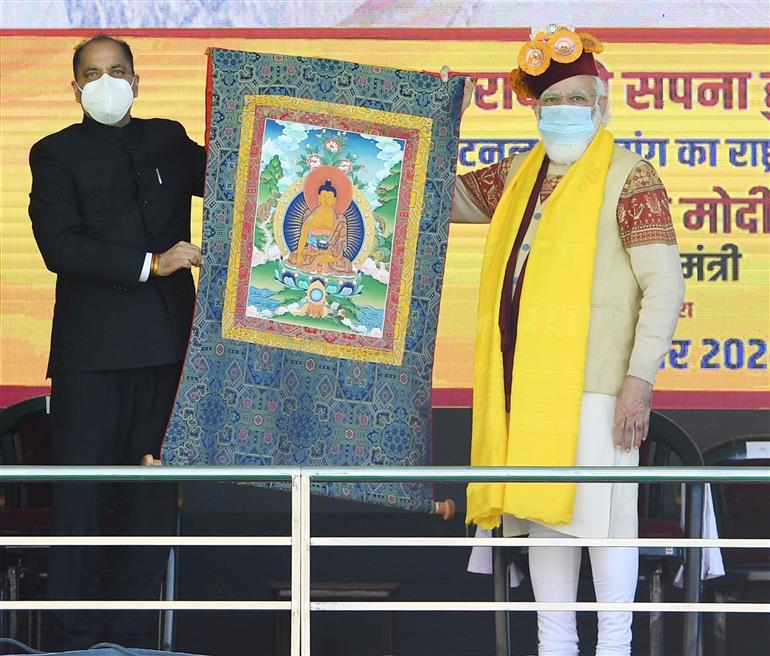
Prime Minister Modi participates in ‘Abhar Samaroh’, at Sissu, in Himachal Pradesh on 3 October 2020. The Chief Minister of Himachal Pradesh is also seen

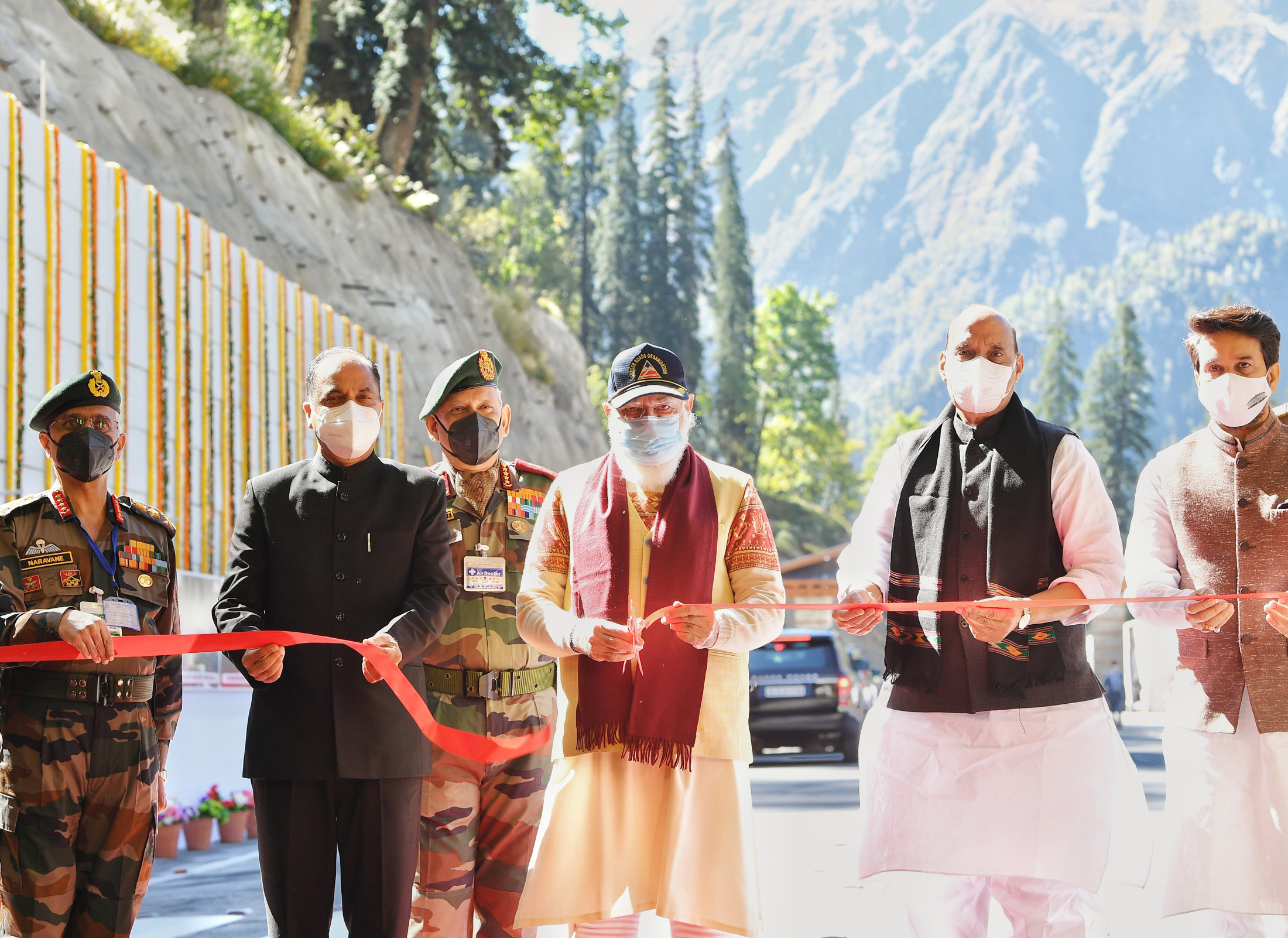
The Prime Minister, Shri Narendra Modi dedicates to the nation the world's longest highway tunnel - Atal Tunnel, in Manali, Himachal Pradesh on 3 October 2020

== See also ==
- Jai Ram Thakur ministry

Preceded by Virbhadra Singh	Chief Minister of Himachal Pradesh; 27 December 2017 – 11 December 2022	Succeeded by Sukhvinder Singh Sukhu
