= Mukesh Agnihotri =

Indian politician (born 1962)

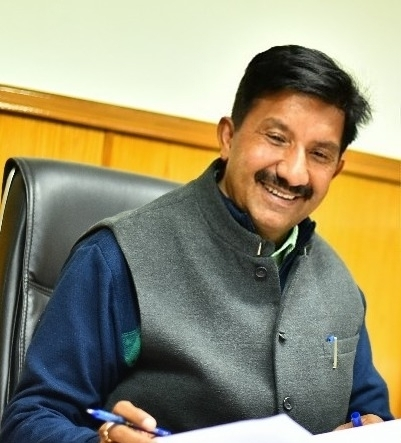
- Agnihotri in 2022

Deputy Chief Minister of Himachal Pradesh
- Incumbent
- Assumed office 11 December 2022
- Governor: Rajendra Arlekar (2022–2023); Shiv Pratap Shukla (2023–2026); Kavinder Gupta (2026–present)
- Chief Minister: Sukhvinder Singh Sukhu
- Preceded by: Position established
Additional ministries
Incumbent
Assumed office 11 December 2022
Ministry and Departments	Jal Shakti; Transport; Language, Arts and Culture; Cooperation
Preceded by	Position established

Member of Himachal Pradesh Legislative Assembly
- Incumbent
- Assumed office March 2003
- Preceded by: Jai Kishan Sharma (BJP)
- Constituency: Haroli (previously Santokhgarh)

Leader of the Opposition in Himachal Pradesh Legislative Assembly
- In office 5 January 2018 – 8 December 2022
- Speaker: Rajeev Bindal (till 2020); Vipin Singh Parmar (from 2020)
- Preceded by: Prem Kumar Dhumal
- Succeeded by: Jai Ram Thakur

Chairperson of Himachal Pradesh Congress Committee
- In office 27 December 2017 – 11 December 2022
- Preceded by: Virbhadra Singh
- Succeeded by: Sukhvinder Singh Sukhu

Personal details
- Born: 9 October 1962 (age 64) Sangrur, Punjab, India
- Party: Indian National Congress
- Spouse: Prof Simmi Agnihotri
- Website: Official website; Government website

Mukesh Agnihotri (born 9 October 1962) is an Indian politician from Himachal Pradesh representing Indian National Congress.He is the current Deputy Chief Minister of Himachal Pradesh. He is also a Member of Legislative Assembly in the Himachal Pradesh Legislative Assembly from the Haroli Constituency in the Una District of Himachal Pradesh.

In 2025, Harsh Mahajan, Member of the Legislative Assembly in the Himachal Pradesh Legislative Assembly claimed that Mukesh Agnihotri is misleading People of Himachal on Jal Shakti Schemes Funds.

He is a five time MLA from the Haroli Assembly constituency winning the Himachal Pradesh Legislative Assembly elections in 2003, 2007, 2012, 2017 and 2022. He was inducted into the cabinet as Industries minister with additional charge of Labour and Employment, Parliamentary Affairs, Information and Public Relations from 2012 to 2017. He was the leader of the Congress Legislature Party in Himachal Pradesh from 2018 to 2022.

== Early life and education ==
Agnihotri was born in Sangrur, Punjab. He holds a post graduate diploma in public relations and advertisement and an M.Sc. in Mathematics. He married Simmi Agnihotri, a professor at Himachal Pradesh University. She died at the age of 56 due to a cardiac arrest in February 2024. Aastha Agnihotri, their daughter, is an Assistant Professor in the Department of Law, Himachal Pradesh University.

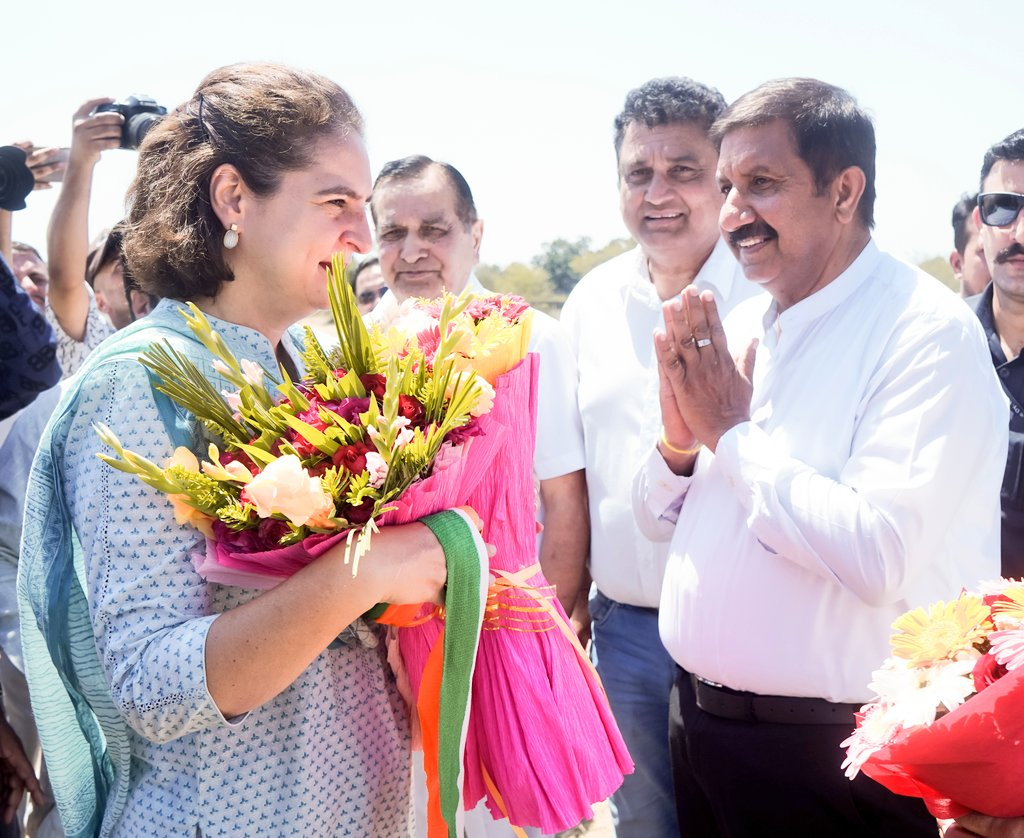
Dy CM Himachal Pradesh Sh Mukesh Agnihotri greeting Smt Priyanka Gandhi at Una on 28th May 2024

== Career ==
Elected to State Legislative Assembly in March, 2003 and got re-elected in 2007 from Santokhgarh Assembly Constituency. In 2012 he won from Haroli Assembly constituency. Before delimitation in 2007, Haroli Assembly segment was known as Santokhgarh. He got re-elected to the thirteenth Vidhan Sabha (4th term) from Haroli in 2017. He was elected as Congress Legislature Party Leader on 4 January 2018. He won Haroli again in 2022 and currently is serving as the Deputy Chief Minister of Himachal Pradesh.

== See also ==
- Himachal Pradesh Legislative Assembly
- Government of Himachal Pradesh
- Tenth Legislative Assembly of Himachal Pradesh
