= Haroli Assembly constituency =

Legislative Assembly constituency in Himachal Pradesh State, India

Coordinates: 31.42°N 76.23°E

Haroli
- Constituency No. 43 for the Himachal Pradesh Legislative Assembly

Constituency details
- Country: India
- Region: North India
- State: Himachal Pradesh
- District: Una
- Lok Sabha constituency: Hamirpur
- Established: 2008
- Total electors: 88,951
- Reservation: None

Member of Legislative Assembly
- 14th Himachal Pradesh Legislative Assembly
- Incumbent Mukesh Agnihotri
- Party: Indian National Congress
- Elected year: 2022

Haroli Assembly constituency is one of the 68 constituencies in the Himachal Pradesh Legislative Assembly of Himachal Pradesh a northern state of India. Haroli is also part of Hamirpur, Himachal Pradesh Lok Sabha constituency.

== Member of Legislative Assembly ==
Year	Member	Picture	Party
2012	Mukesh Agnihotri		Indian National Congress
2017	Mukesh Agnihotri		Indian National Congress
2022	Mukesh Agnihotri		Indian National Congress

== Election results ==
=== Assembly Election 2022 ===
2022 Himachal Pradesh Legislative Assembly election: Haroli
Party	Candidate	Votes	%	±%
INC	Mukesh Agnihotri	38,652	55.33%	▲1.58
BJP	Ram Kumar	29,504	42.23%	▼0.21
BSP	Naresh Kumar	636	0.91%	▲0.33
AAP	Ravinder Mann	601	0.86%	New
Rashtriya Devbhumi Party	Ashhwani Kumar Rana	290	0.42%	New
NOTA	Nota	175	0.25%	▼0.44
Margin of victory		9,148	13.10%	▲1.80
Turnout		69,858	78.54%	▼1.88
Registered electors		88,951		▲9.55
INC hold		Swing	▲1.58	

=== Assembly Election 2017 ===
2017 Himachal Pradesh Legislative Assembly election: Haroli
Party	Candidate	Votes	%	±%
INC	Mukesh Agnihotri	35,095	53.75%	▲1.06
BJP	Ram Kumar	27,718	42.45%	▼0.80
Independent	Ravinder Mann	833	1.28%	New
NOTA	None of the Above	448	0.69%	New
BSP	Virender Kumar	376	0.58%	▼1.34
Margin of victory		7,377	11.30%	▲1.86
Turnout		65,297	80.42%	▲4.54
Registered electors		81,198		▲12.42
INC hold		Swing	▲1.06	

=== Assembly Election 2012 ===
2012 Himachal Pradesh Legislative Assembly election: Haroli
Party	Candidate	Votes	%	±%
INC	Mukesh Agnihotri	28,875	52.69%	New
BJP	Ram Kumar	23,703	43.25%	New
BSP	Mukesh Choudhari	1,052	1.92%	New
AITC	Sanjiv Fanda	902	1.65%	New
Margin of victory		5,172	9.44%	
Turnout		54,800	75.87%	
Registered electors		72,225		
INC win (new seat)				

== See also ==
- Haroli
- Una district
- List of constituencies of Himachal Pradesh Legislative Assembly
