= Government of Himachal Pradesh =

Indian state government

Legislative Branch
- Assembly: Himachal Pradesh Vidhan Sabha
- Speaker: Kuldeep Singh Pathania

Executive branch
- Governor: Kavinder Gupta
- Chief Minister: Sukhvinder Singh Sukhu
- Deputy Chief Minister: Mukesh Agnihotri
- Chief Secretary: Kamlesh Kumar Pant, IAS

Judiciary
- Court: Himachal Pradesh High Court
- Chief Justice: Gurmeet Singh Sandhawalia
- Seat: Shimla

The Government of Himachal Pradesh also known as the State Government of Himachal Pradesh, or locally as State Government, is the supreme governing authority of the Indian state of Himachal Pradesh. It consists of an executive branch, led by the Governor of Himachal Pradesh, a judiciary and a legislative branch.

Like other states in India, the head of state of Himachal Pradesh is the Governor, appointed by the President of India on the advice of the Central government. The post of governor is largely ceremonial. The Chief Minister is the head of government and council of ministers. There exists parliamentary system of government in state with council of ministers responsible to legislative assembly. Shimla is the capital of Himachal Pradesh, and houses the Vidhan Sabha (Legislative Assembly) and the secretariat . The Himachal Pradesh High Court is located in Shimla, which has jurisdiction over the whole of Himachal Pradesh. State legislature is unicameral having legislative assembly composed of MLAs elected directly by the people of the state.

== Executive branches ==
=== Himachal Pradesh Council of Ministers ===
Council of Ministers			
S.No	Name	Designation	Department
1	Sukhvinder Singh Sukhu	Chief Minister	Home; General administrations; Finance; Planning; Personnel and all other departments not allotted to any other minister.
2	Mukesh Agnihotri	Deputy Chief Minister	Jal Shakti; Transport; Language Art & Culture
3	Anirudh Singh	Panchayati raj Minister	Rural Development; Panchayati raj
4	Jagat Singh Negi	Revenue Minister	Revenue; Horticulture; Tribal Development
5	Prof. Chander Kumar	Agriculture Minister	Agriculture; Animal husbandry; Fisheries
6	Harshwardhan Chuhan	Industries Minister	Industries; Parliamentary Affair; Labour and Employment
7	Rohit Thakur	Education Minister	Higher education; Elementary education; Technical Education; Vocational & Industrial Training
8	Col. Dhani Ram Shandil	Health and Family Welfare Minister	Health and Family Welfare; Social Justice and Empowerment; Sainik Welfare
9	Vikramaditya Singh	Public Work Minister	Public Works; Urban Development
10	Yadvinder Goma	Ayush Minister	Ayush; Youth Services and Sports; Law & Legal Remembrancer's

Like in other Indian states, the executive arm of the state is responsible for the day-to-day management of the state. It consists of the governor, the chief minister and the Council of Ministers. The chief minister and the council of ministers also have been appointed by the governor. The governor summons prorogues and dissolves the legislature. He can close the legislative assembly on the recommendation of the chief minister. Judiciary has been separated from the executive in Himachal Pradesh like other Indian states.

The executive authority is headed by the Chief Minister of Himachal Pradesh, who is the de facto head of state and is vested with most of the executive powers; the Legislative Assembly's majority party leader is appointed to this position by the Governor. The present Chief Minister is Sukhvinder Singh Sukhu, who took office on 11 December 2022. Generally, the winning party decides the chief minister. In many cases, the party announces a chief ministerial candidate during the election.

The Council of Ministers, which answers to the Legislative Assembly, has its members appointed by the Governor; the appointments receive input from the Chief Minister. They are collectively responsible to the legislative assembly of the State. Generally, the winning party and its chief minister chooses the ministers list and submit the list for the Governor's approval.

=== Governor ===
The governor is appointed by the President for a term of five years. The executive and legislative powers lie with the Chief Minister and his council of ministers, who are appointed by the governor. The governors of the states and territories of India have similar powers and functions at the state level as that of the president of India at the national level. Only Indian citizens above 35 years of age are eligible for appointment. Governors discharge all constitutional functions, such as the appointment of the chief minister, sending

Kavinder Gupta is the present governor.

The governor enjoys many different types of powers:

- Executive powers related to administration, appointments, and removal
- Legislative powers related to lawmaking and the state legislature
- Discretionary powers to be carried out according to the discretion of the governor

== Legislative branch ==
The legislature comprises the governor and the legislative assembly, which is the highest political organ in the state. The governor has the power to summon the assembly or to close the same. All members of the legislative assembly are directly elected, normally once in every five years by the eligible voters who are above 18 years of age. The current assembly consists of 68 elected members . The elected members select one of its own members as its chairman who is called the speaker. The speaker is assisted by the deputy speaker who is also elected by the members. The conduct of a meeting in the house is the responsibility of the speaker.

The main function of the assembly is to pass laws and rules. Every bill passed by the house has to be finally approved by the governor before it becomes applicable.

The normal term of the legislative assembly is five years from the date appointed for its first meeting. But while a proclamation of state of emergency is in operation, the said period will be extended by Parliament by Laws for a period not exceeding one year at a time

== State administrative structure ==
State administrative structure
Administrative structure (2002)	Numbers
Districts	12
Tehsils	75
Subdivisions	52
Blocks	75
Villages	20690
Towns	57
Constituencies	Numbers
Lok Sabha	4
Rajya Sabha	3
Assembly constituencies	68

The Himachal Pradesh Legislative Assembly has no pre-Constitution history. The state itself is a post-independence creation. It first came into being as a centrally administered territory on 15 April 1948 by the integration of 30 erstwhile princely states.

Himachal Pradesh is governed through a parliamentary system of representative democracy, a feature the state shares with other Indian states. Universal suffrage is granted to residents.

The legislature of Himachal Pradesh is unicameral and at present, the Assembly has a strength of 68. The tenure of the Assembly is five years unless it is sooner dissolved. There are 14 House Committees in the Assembly.

== See also ==
- Politics of Himachal Pradesh
- Legislative Assembly of Himachal Pradesh

== Notes ==
1. Himachal Government - Council of Ministers
