= Sukhvinder Singh Sukhu =

7th and current Chief Minister of Himachal Pradesh

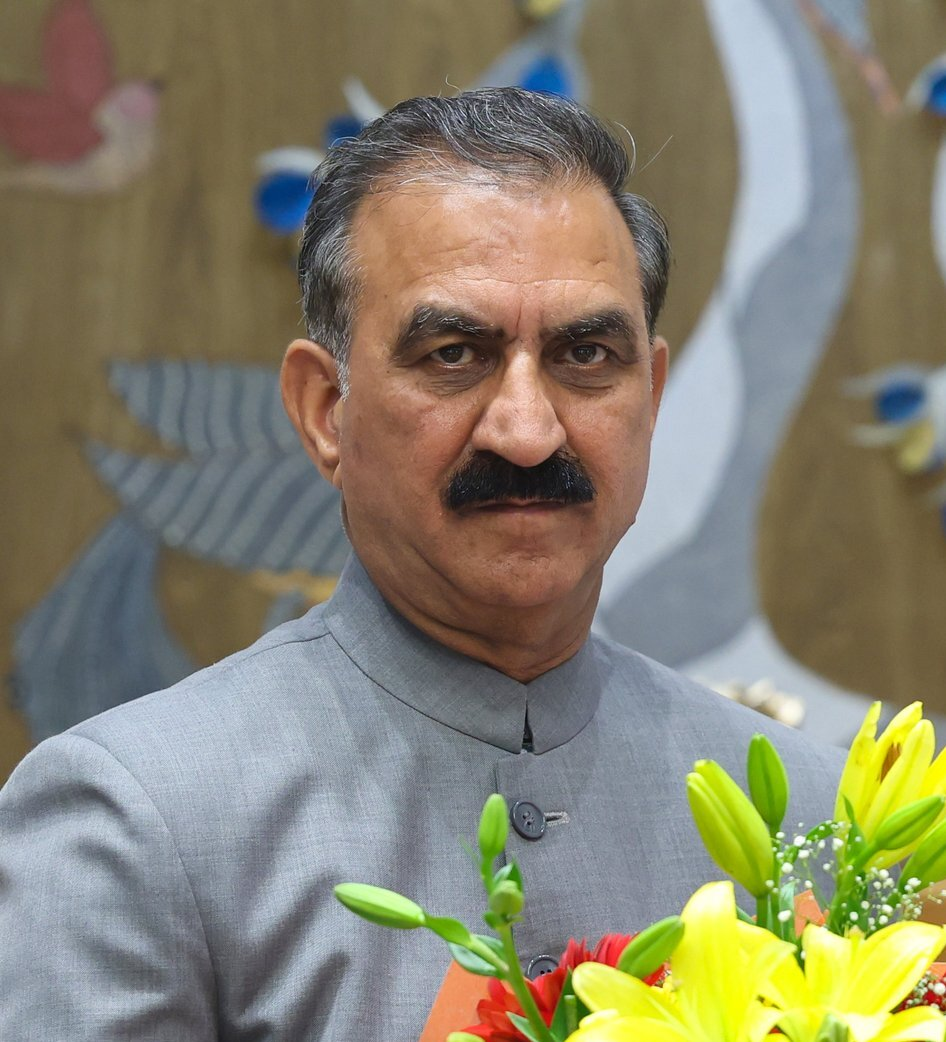
- Sukhu, c. 2025

7th Chief Minister of Himachal Pradesh
- Incumbent
- Assumed office 11 December 2022
- Governor: Rajendra Arlekar; Shiv Pratap Shukla; Kavinder Gupta
- Deputy: Mukesh Agnihotri
- Cabinet: Sukhu
- Preceded by: Jai Ram Thakur
Additional ministries
Incumbent
Assumed office 11 December 2022
Ministry and Departments	Finance; General Administration; Home; Planning; Personnel; Other departments not allotted to any minister
Preceded by	Jai Ram Thakur

Member of the Himachal Pradesh Legislative Assembly
- Incumbent
- Assumed office 18 December 2017
- Preceded by: Vijay Agnihotri
- Constituency: Nadaun
- In office 6 March 2003 – 20 December 2012
- Preceded by: Babu Ram Mandial
- Succeeded by: Vijay Agnihotri
- Constituency: Nadaun

President of Himachal Pradesh Congress Committee
- In office 15 January 2013 – 11 January 2019
- National President: Sonia Gandhi; Rahul Gandhi
- Preceded by: Virbhadra Singh
- Succeeded by: Kuldeep Singh Rathore

Personal details
- Born: 27 March 1964 (age 62) Nadaun, Himachal Pradesh, India
- Party: Indian National Congress
- Spouse: Kamlesh Thakur
- Children: 2
- Education: Government College, Sanjauli, Shimla; Himachal Pradesh University
- Occupation: Politician

Sukhvinder Singh Sukhu (born 27 March 1964) is an Indian politician. He is serving as the 7th Chief Minister of Himachal Pradesh since 11 Dec 2022 and also serving as leader of the house in legislative assembly. As a member of Indian National Congress, he is a 4-time and incumbent MLA from Nadaun assembly constituency of Himachal Pradesh. He was the president of the Himachal Pradesh Congress Committee from 2013 to 2019 .

== Early life ==
Sukhvinder Singh Sukhu was born in a Rajput family on 27 March 1964 in the village of Bhavran, Po Kitpal, tehsil Nadaun, Hamirpur district, the son of Late Shri Rasil Singh, a bus driver for the Himachal Pradesh Transport Corporation, and Sansar Dei, a housewife. He pursued his education and earned an M.A. and L.L.B. Sukhvinder Singh married Kamlesh Thakur, and they have two daughters.

In his early life, Sukhvinder Singh Sukhu demonstrated leadership qualities during his college years. He was elected as the Class Representative (CR) at Government Degree College, Sanjauli, Shimla, from 1982 to 1983. His leadership roles continued with his election as the General Secretary and later as the President of Government Degree College, Sanjauli, Shimla, for the years 1983-1984 and 1984-1985, respectively. He was also elected as the Department Representative (DR) for the Law Department at Himachal Pradesh University in 1985-1986.

== Political career ==
Sukhvinder Singh Sukhu's political journey began as a student activist when he joined the National Student Union of India (NSUI), the student arm of the Congress. He was elected as the State President of NSUI from 1989 to 1995. His commitment to political and social work continued as he became the General Secretary of the State Youth Congress from 1995 to 1998 and later its President from 1998 to 2008.

In addition to his role in student and youth politics, Sukhvinder Singh Sukhu served as a Councillor in the Municipal Corporation, Shimla, for two terms from 1993-1998 and 1998-2003.

His leadership within the Congress Party progressed as he took on the role of General Secretary of Pradesh Congress Committee from 2008 to 2012. Subsequently, he became the President of Pradesh Congress Committee, leading the state unit of the party from January 8, 2013, to 11 January 2019.

== Legislative career ==
Sukhvinder Singh Sukhu entered the State Legislative Assembly in 2003 and was re-elected in December 2007 and December 2017. During his legislative terms, he served as the Chief Whip of the Congress Legislature Party from 2007 to 2012. He was a member of various committees, including the Business Advisory Committee, Library, Research & Reference Committee, and Public Undertakings & Privileges Committees from 2018 to 2022.

In December 2022, Sukhvinder Singh Sukhu was elected for the fourth term to the State Legislative Assembly. On 11 December 2022, he took oath as the Chief Minister of Himachal Pradesh.

=== Chief Minister of Himachal Pradesh ===
Sukhu was a prominent campaigner for the INC in the 2022 assembly elections in the state of Himachal Pradesh. The Himachal Pradesh Congress Committee appointed him Chief Minister on 10 December 2022; he was sworn in the next day, after the INC won the assembly elections.

==== Ministry allocation ====
After becoming Chief Minister of Himachal Pradesh, Sukhu kept around more than 5 ministries under his direct control, including Finance, General, Administration, Home, Planning, Personnel were not allotted to any other minister.

In his first cabinet meeting, held on 13 January 2023, the decision was taken to restore the old pension scheme, fulfilling the poll promise of the Congress. The Cabinet decided to provide OPS to all the Government employees who are presently covered under the defined contributory pension scheme also referred to as NPS. This will benefit to about 1.36 lakh NPS employees in the State.

== See also ==
- Sukhu ministry

Preceded by Jai Ram Thakur	Chief Minister of Himachal Pradesh; 11 December 2022 – present	Succeeded by Incumbent
