= Second Dhumal ministry =

- Ministry of Himachal Pradesh
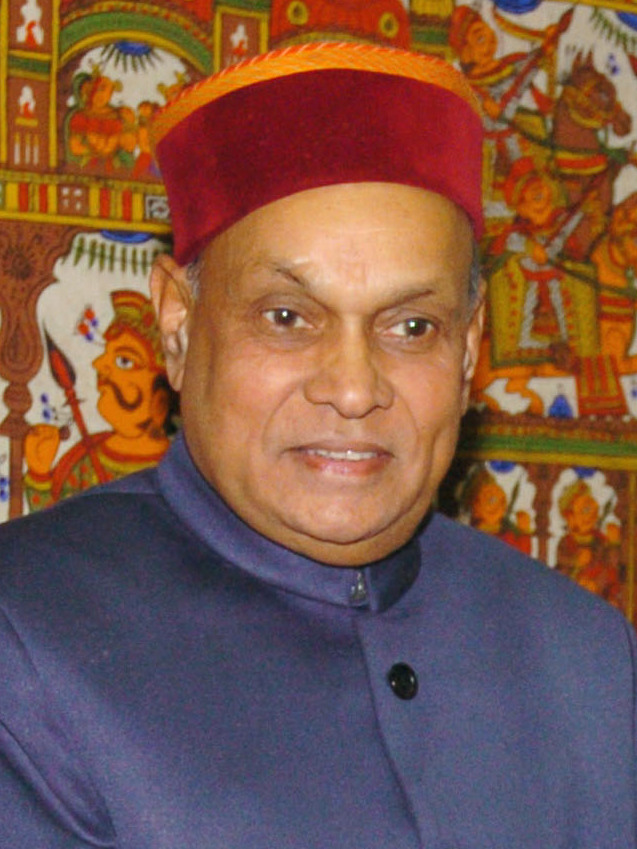
- Date formed: 30 December 2007
- Date dissolved: 25 December 2012

People and organisations
- Governor: Vishnu Sadashiv Kokje
- Chief Minister: Prem Kumar Dhumal
- No. of ministers: 12
- Member parties: BJP
- Status in legislature: Majority
- Opposition party: INC
- Opposition leader: Vidya Stokes

History
- Election: 2007
- Legislature terms: 4 years, 361 days
- Predecessor: Fourth Virbhadra ministry
- Successor: Fifth Virbhadra Singh ministry

Prem Kumar Dhumal, the leader of BJP was sworn in as the chief minister of Himachal Pradesh on 30 December 2007. On 9 January 2008, Jatin inducted nine cabinet ministers. On 9 July 2009 2 cabinet ministers were inducted taking the strength of the cabinet to 12.

== Council of Ministers ==
Portfolio	Minister	Took office	Left office	Party
Chief Minister	Prem Kumar Dhumal	30 December 2007	25 December 2012	BJP
Minister of Revenue; Minister of Public Works Department	Gulab Singh Thakur	9 January 2008	25 December 2012	BJP
Minister of Higher Education	Ishwar Dass Dhiman	9 January 2008	25 December 2012	BJP
Minister of Environment & Forest; Minister of Parliamentary Affairs	Jagat Prakash Nadda	9 January 2008	11 May 2010	BJP
Minister of Environment & Forest; Minister of Parliamentary Affairs	Khimi Ram	23 February 2012	25 December 2012	BJP
Minister of Irrigation	Ravinder Singh Ravi	9 January 2008	25 December 2012	BJP
Minister of Urban Development & Housing	Kishan Kapoor	9 January 2008	25 December 2012	BJP
Minister of Transport	Kishan Kapoor	9 January 2008	9 July 2009	BJP
Minister of Transport	Mahender Singh	9 July 2009	25 December 2012	BJP
Minister of Horticulture; Minister of Technical Education	Narinder Bragta	9 January 2008	25 December 2012	BJP
Minister of Food & Civil Supplies; Minister of Labour	Jatin Puri	9 January 2008	25 December 2012	BJP
Minister of Health & Family Welfare	Rajeev Bindal	9 January 2008	25 December 2012	BJP
Minister of Social Justice & Empowerment	Bhawna Malhi	9 January 2008	25 December 2012	BJP
Minister of Rural Development	Jai Ram Thakur	9 July 2009	25 December 2012	BJP
