= Banjar Assembly constituency =

Legislative Assembly constituency in Himachal Pradesh State, India

Coordinates: 31.64°N 77.35°E

Banjar
- Constituency No. 24 for the Himachal Pradesh Legislative Assembly

Constituency details
- Country: India
- Region: North India
- State: Himachal Pradesh
- District: Kullu
- Lok Sabha constituency: Mandi
- Established: 1967
- Total electors: 75,592
- Reservation: None

Member of Legislative Assembly
- 14th Himachal Pradesh Legislative Assembly
- Incumbent Surender Shourie
- Party: Bharatiya Janata Party
- Elected year: 2022

Banjar Assembly constituency is one of the 68 constituencies in the Himachal Pradesh Legislative Assembly of Himachal Pradesh a northern state of India. Banjar is also part of Mandi Lok Sabha constituency.

== Members of Legislative Assembly ==
- 1967 to 1977: Dileram Shabab (Indian National Congress)
- 2017 to 2022: Surender Shourie (Bharatiya Janata party)
- (2022–Present): Surender Shourie (Bharatiya Janata party)

Year	Member	Picture	Party
1977	Maheshwar Singh		Janata Party
1982	Maheshwar Singh		Bharatiya Janata Party
1985	Satya Parkash Thakur		Indian National Congress
1990	Karan Singh		Bharatiya Janata Party
1993	Satya Parkash Thakur		Indian National Congress
1998	Karan Singh		Bharatiya Janata Party
2003	Khimi Ram		Bharatiya Janata Party
2007	Khimi Ram		Bharatiya Janata Party
2012	Karan Singh		Indian National Congress
2017	Surender Shourie		Bharatiya Janata Party
2022	Surender Shourie		Bharatiya Janata Party

== Election results ==
=== Assembly Election 2022 ===
2022 Himachal Pradesh Legislative Assembly election: Banjar
Party	Candidate	Votes	%	±%
BJP	Surender Shourie	25,038	40.44%	▼10.59
INC	Khimi Ram	20,704	33.44%	▼11.68
Independent	Hiteshwar Singh	14,932	24.12%	New
NOTA	Nota	492	0.79%	▼0.45
Margin of victory		4,334	7.00%	▲1.10
Turnout		61,908	81.90%	▼1.10
Registered electors		75,592		▲14.32
BJP hold		Swing	▼10.59	

=== Assembly Election 2017 ===
2017 Himachal Pradesh Legislative Assembly election: Banjar
Party	Candidate	Votes	%	±%
BJP	Surender Shourie	28,007	51.03%	▲11.24
INC	Aditya Vikram Singh	24,767	45.13%	▼12.85
NOTA	None of the Above	684	1.25%	New
BSP	Jhabe Ram Kaushal	535	0.97%	New
Margin of victory		3,240	5.90%	▼12.28
Turnout		54,882	83.00%	▲0.06
Registered electors		66,126		▲7.35
BJP gain from INC		Swing	▼6.95	

=== Assembly Election 2012 ===
2012 Himachal Pradesh Legislative Assembly election: Banjar
Party	Candidate	Votes	%	±%
INC	Karan Singh	29,622	57.98%	▲23.79
BJP	Khimi Ram	20,330	39.79%	▲5.29
CPI(M)	Narayan Singh	474	0.93%	▼0.91
Independent	Paras Ram	412	0.81%	New
Margin of victory		9,292	18.19%	▲17.87
Turnout		51,088	82.94%	▲5.14
Registered electors		61,599		▼33.95
INC gain from BJP		Swing	▲23.47	

=== Assembly Election 2007 ===
2007 Himachal Pradesh Legislative Assembly election: Banjar
Party	Candidate	Votes	%	±%
BJP	Khimi Ram	25,037	34.51%	▼12.43
INC	Satya Parkash Thakur	24,805	34.19%	▼5.83
BSP	Karan Singh	19,635	27.06%	New
CPI(M)	Narayan Singh	1,334	1.84%	New
LJP	Dhale Ram	602	0.83%	New
Independent	Rameshwari Sharma	550	0.76%	New
Independent	Rakesh Vaidya	518	0.71%	New
Margin of victory		232	0.32%	▼6.59
Turnout		72,555	77.80%	▼0.83
Registered electors		93,262		▲11.59
BJP hold		Swing	▼12.43	

=== Assembly Election 2003 ===
2003 Himachal Pradesh Legislative Assembly election: Banjar
Party	Candidate	Votes	%	±%
BJP	Khimi Ram	30,842	46.93%	▲0.06
INC	Satya Parkash Thakur	26,300	40.02%	▼1.87
Independent	Achhar Singh	6,364	9.68%	New
LHMP	Dalip Singh	2,207	3.36%	New
Margin of victory		4,542	6.91%	▲1.92
Turnout		65,713	78.77%	▲7.61
Registered electors		83,572		▲8.28
BJP hold		Swing	▲0.06	

=== Assembly Election 1998 ===
1998 Himachal Pradesh Legislative Assembly election: Banjar
Party	Candidate	Votes	%	±%
BJP	Karan Singh	25,696	46.88%	▲0.56
INC	Satya Prakash Thakur	22,961	41.89%	▼8.59
HVC	Dalip Singh	5,439	9.92%	New
BSP	Naresh Kumar	550	1.00%	▲0.05
Margin of victory		2,735	4.99%	▲0.83
Turnout		54,813	71.42%	▼3.86
Registered electors		77,183		▲18.89
BJP gain from INC		Swing	▼3.60	

=== Assembly Election 1993 ===
1993 Himachal Pradesh Legislative Assembly election: Banjar
Party	Candidate	Votes	%	±%
INC	Satya Parkash Thakur	24,539	50.48%	▲11.52
BJP	Karan Singh	22,518	46.32%	▼4.45
JD	Rupender Singh	764	1.57%	New
BSP	Kurmi Ram	464	0.95%	New
Margin of victory		2,021	4.16%	▼7.65
Turnout		48,614	75.29%	▲1.62
Registered electors		64,922		▲9.33
INC gain from BJP		Swing	▼0.29	

=== Assembly Election 1990 ===
1990 Himachal Pradesh Legislative Assembly election: Banjar
Party	Candidate	Votes	%	±%
BJP	Karan Singh	22,084	50.77%	▲1.78
INC	Satya Prakash Thakur	16,948	38.96%	▼11.67
INS(SCS)	Dile Ram Shabab	3,990	9.17%	New
Margin of victory		5,136	11.81%	▲10.16
Turnout		43,501	73.59%	▼2.30
Registered electors		59,382		▲30.69
BJP gain from INC		Swing		

=== Assembly Election 1985 ===
1985 Himachal Pradesh Legislative Assembly election: Banjar
Party	Candidate	Votes	%	±%
INC	Satya Parkash Thakur	17,383	50.64%	▲13.29
BJP	Maheshwar Singh	16,816	48.98%	▼11.56
Margin of victory		567	1.65%	▼21.54
Turnout		34,330	76.04%	▲2.18
Registered electors		45,437		▲4.88
INC gain from BJP		Swing		

=== Assembly Election 1982 ===
1982 Himachal Pradesh Legislative Assembly election: Banjar
Party	Candidate	Votes	%	±%
BJP	Maheshwar Singh	19,243	60.54%	New
INC	Dile Ram Shabab	11,872	37.35%	▲4.67
Independent	Paras Ram	335	1.05%	New
JP	Prem Singh	237	0.75%	▼51.98
Margin of victory		7,371	23.19%	▲3.15
Turnout		31,786	74.10%	▲18.69
Registered electors		43,321		▲19.20
BJP gain from JP		Swing	▲7.81	

=== Assembly Election 1977 ===
1977 Himachal Pradesh Legislative Assembly election: Banjar
Party	Candidate	Votes	%	±%
JP	Maheshwar Singh	10,478	52.72%	New
INC	Dile Ram Shabab	6,495	32.68%	New
Independent	Mohar Singh	1,902	9.57%	New
Independent	Bhag Chand	614	3.09%	New
Independent	Om Prakash Bhalla	230	1.16%	New
Independent	Nawal Thakur	154	0.77%	New
Margin of victory		3,983	20.04%	
Turnout		19,873	55.29%	
Registered electors		36,344		
JP win (new seat)				

== See also ==
- Kullu district
- List of constituencies of Himachal Pradesh Legislative Assembly
