= HLM (disambiguation) =

HLM (Habitation à Loyer Modéré) is a form of housing in France and Switzerland.

HLM may also refer to:

- HLM (Dakar), a commune d'arrondissement of the city of Dakar, Senegal
- ASC HLM, a Senegalese football club
- Hallam railway station, Melbourne
- High Life Music, a record label
- Him Loktantrik Morcha, a political front in Himachal Pradesh, India
- Hierarchical linear model, in statistics
- Holmwood railway station, in England
- Park Township Airport, in Holland, Michigan, United States
- Hotline Miami, a video game by Dennaton Games
- Halim railway station, a high-speed rail station in Jakarta, Indonesia
