= Bhuvneshwar Gaur =

Indian politician

Bhuvaneshwar Gaur (born 1974) is an Indian politician from Himachal Pradesh. He is an MLA from Manali Assembly constituency in Kullu district. He won the 2022 Himachal Pradesh Legislative Assembly election representing the Indian National Congress.

== Early life and education ==
Gaur is from Manali, Kullu district, Himachal Pradesh. He is the son of Raj Krishan Gaur. He completed his BA in English through Indira Gandhi National Open University in 2017.

== Career ==
Gaur won from Manali Assembly constituency representing the Indian National Congress in the 2022 Himachal Pradesh Legislative Assembly election. He polled 29,892 votes and defeated his nearest rival, Govind Singh Thakur of the Bharatiya Janata Party, by a margin of 2,957 votes. In March 2024, Gaur lodged a police complaint against Ashish Sharma, an independent MLA from Hamirpur, and Rakesh Sharma, father of Chaitanya Sharma, the disqualified MLA from Gagret, for electoral offences during the Rajya Sabha election.
