= Pulga =

Pulga (Spanish for flea) or La Pulga may refer to:

== People ==
- Lionel Messi (born 1987), Argentine football player, nicknamed "La Pulga"
- Pulga (footballer) (born 1985), Spanish football player
- Enrique González "La Pulga" (1890–1957), Cuban singer-songwriter
- Ivo Pulga (born 1964), Italian football player and coach
- Stefano Pulga (born 1954), Italian musician and producer

== Places ==
- Pulga, California, US, an unincorporated community
- Pulga Bridges, California, US, two bridges on the North Fork Feather River
- Pulga, Himachal Pradesh, India

== Other uses ==
- Bugaboo (The Flea), a 1983 computer game published as La Pulga in Spain
