= Dharampur, Himachal Pradesh Assembly constituency =

Legislative Assembly constituency in Himachal Pradesh State, India

Coordinates: 30.9°N 77.02°E

Dharampur
- Constituency No. 32 for the Himachal Pradesh Legislative Assembly

Constituency details
- Country: India
- Region: North India
- State: Himachal Pradesh
- District: Mandi
- Lok Sabha constituency: Hamirpur
- Total electors: 82,732
- Reservation: None

Member of Legislative Assembly
- 14th Himachal Pradesh Legislative Assembly
- Incumbent Chander Shekhar
- Party: Indian National Congress
- Elected year: 2022

Dharampur is one of the 68 assembly constituencies of Himachal Pradesh, a state in northern India. It is also part of Hamirpur, Himachal Pradesh Lok Sabha constituency.

== Members of Legislative Assembly & Member of Territorial Council ==
- Sant Ram Thakur from Indian National Congress was The Member of Territorial Council 1957 & 1962. MLA from 1962 to 1967

Year	Member	Party
1967	K. Singh	Indian National Congress
1972	Bhikham Ram	Independent politician
1977	Om Chand	Janata Party
1982	Bhikham Ram	Indian National Congress
1984 By-election	Natha Singh	Indian National Congress
1985	Natha Singh	Indian National Congress
1990	Mahender Singh	Independent politician
1993	Mahender Singh	Indian National Congress
1998	Mahender Singh	Himachal Vikas Congress
2003	Mahender Singh	Loktantrik Morcha Himachal Pradesh
2007	Mahender Singh	Bharatiya Janata Party
2012	Mahender Singh	Bharatiya Janata Party
2017	Mahender Singh	Bharatiya Janata Party
2022	Chander Shekhar	Indian National Congress

== Election results ==
=== Assembly Election 2022 ===
2022 Himachal Pradesh Legislative Assembly election: Dharampur
Party	Candidate	Votes	%	±%
INC	Chander Shekhar Thakur	31,063	51.90%	▲19.80
BJP	Rajat Thakur	28,037	46.84%	▼9.31
AAP	Rakesh Mandhotra	230	0.38%	New
NOTA	Nota	216	0.36%	▼0.31
BSP	Prakash Chand Bhardwaj	170	0.28%	New
Independent	Chander Shekhar	141	0.24%	New
Margin of victory		3,026	5.06%	▼18.99
Turnout		59,857	72.35%	▲5.17
Registered electors		82,732		▲11.72
INC gain from BJP		Swing	▼4.25	

=== Assembly Election 2017 ===
2017 Himachal Pradesh Legislative Assembly election: Dharampur
Party	Candidate	Votes	%	±%
BJP	Mahender Singh	27,931	56.15%	▲6.61
INC	Chander Shekhar Thakur	15,967	32.10%	▼15.29
CPI(M)	Bhupender Singh	3,284	6.60%	New
Rashtriya Azad Manch	Ramesh Kumar Guleria	428	0.86%	New
NOTA	None of the Above	333	0.67%	New
Margin of victory		11,964	24.05%	▲21.90
Turnout		49,746	67.18%	▼3.51
Registered electors		74,052		▲7.91
BJP hold		Swing	▲6.61	

=== Assembly Election 2012 ===
2012 Himachal Pradesh Legislative Assembly election: Dharampur
Party	Candidate	Votes	%	±%
BJP	Mahender Singh	24,029	49.54%	▼0.95
INC	Chander Shekhar Thakur	22,988	47.39%	▲18.42
HLC	Abhimanyu	565	1.16%	New
Independent	Suresh Kumar Barwal	318	0.66%	New
Margin of victory		1,041	2.15%	▼19.36
Turnout		48,508	70.68%	▲4.75
Registered electors		68,626		▼1.08
BJP hold		Swing	▼0.95	

=== Assembly Election 2007 ===
2007 Himachal Pradesh Legislative Assembly election: Dharampur
Party	Candidate	Votes	%	±%
BJP	Mahender Singh	23,090	50.48%	▲21.88
INC	Chander Shekhar Thakur	13,252	28.97%	▲7.53
Independent	Natha Singh	5,544	12.12%	New
BSP	Nanak Chand	2,613	5.71%	▲4.08
Independent	Harnam Singh	412	0.90%	New
LJP	Saju Ram	396	0.87%	▼1.34
Independent	Des Raj	270	0.59%	New
Margin of victory		9,838	21.51%	▲12.87
Turnout		45,739	65.93%	▼7.10
Registered electors		69,375		▲11.96
BJP gain from LHMP		Swing	▲13.24	

=== Assembly Election 2003 ===
2003 Himachal Pradesh Legislative Assembly election: Dharampur
Party	Candidate	Votes	%	±%
LHMP	Mahender Singh	16,854	37.25%	New
BJP	Karamvir	12,944	28.61%	▲8.08
INC	Thakur Natha Singh	9,702	21.44%	▼15.53
HVC	Nanak Chand Bhardwaj	3,703	8.18%	▼31.41
LJP	Saju Ram	996	2.20%	New
BSP	Damodar Singh	740	1.64%	New
NCP	Suresh Kumar	311	0.69%	New
Margin of victory		3,910	8.64%	▲6.01
Turnout		45,250	73.10%	▲4.33
Registered electors		61,963		▲15.75
LHMP gain from HVC		Swing	▼2.35	

=== Assembly Election 1998 ===
1998 Himachal Pradesh Legislative Assembly election: Dharampur
Party	Candidate	Votes	%	±%
HVC	Mahender Singh	14,562	39.60%	New
INC	Natha Singh	13,596	36.97%	▼23.79
BJP	Karmvir Verma	7,548	20.52%	▼15.01
CPI(M)	Suresh Kumar Sharma	726	1.97%	New
AIRJP	Ramesh Chand	344	0.94%	New
Margin of victory		966	2.63%	▼22.59
Turnout		36,776	69.34%	▼1.86
Registered electors		53,532		▲14.37
HVC gain from INC		Swing	▼21.16	

=== Assembly Election 1993 ===
1993 Himachal Pradesh Legislative Assembly election: Dharampur
Party	Candidate	Votes	%	±%
INC	Mahender Singh	20,065	60.76%	▲33.19
BJP	Preay Brat	11,737	35.54%	▲7.70
Independent	Roshan Lal	545	1.65%	New
BSP	Ram Nath	427	1.29%	▼1.14
Margin of victory		8,328	25.22%	▲12.65
Turnout		33,026	71.18%	▲4.70
Registered electors		46,808		▲4.04
INC gain from Independent		Swing	▲20.36	

=== Assembly Election 1990 ===
1990 Himachal Pradesh Legislative Assembly election: Dharampur
Party	Candidate	Votes	%	±%
Independent	Mahender Singh	11,970	40.40%	New
BJP	Priya Brat	8,248	27.84%	▲1.94
INC	Natha Singh	8,168	27.57%	▼31.40
BSP	Kehar Singh	722	2.44%	New
CPI	Shiv Kumar	521	1.76%	New
Margin of victory		3,722	12.56%	▼20.50
Turnout		29,629	66.48%	▲0.18
Registered electors		44,992		▲27.05
Independent gain from INC		Swing	▼18.56	

=== Assembly Election 1985 ===
1985 Himachal Pradesh Legislative Assembly election: Dharampur
Party	Candidate	Votes	%	±%
INC	Natha Singh	13,713	58.96%	New
BJP	Om Chand	6,023	25.90%	New
Independent	Sangara Singh	3,142	13.51%	New
JP	Karam Chand Verma	291	1.25%	New
Margin of victory		7,690	33.07%	
Turnout		23,257	66.49%	
Registered electors		35,413		
INC hold		Swing		

=== Assembly By-election 1984 ===
1984 Himachal Pradesh Legislative Assembly by-election: Dharampur
Party	Candidate	Votes	%	±%
INC	Natha Singh	17,366		
BJP	B.Dev	4,755		
LKD	H.Singh	189		
Margin of victory		12,611		
INC hold		Swing		

=== Assembly Election 1982 ===
1982 Himachal Pradesh Legislative Assembly election: Dharampur
Party	Candidate	Votes	%	±%
INC	Bhikham Ram	10,310	49.26%	▲15.39
BJP	Om Chand	8,782	41.96%	New
Independent	Jai Singh	504	2.41%	New
Independent	Mohan Lal	286	1.37%	New
Independent	Khazan Singh	248	1.18%	New
Independent	Saju Ram	218	1.04%	New
LKD	Amar Singh	195	0.93%	New
JP	Gian Chand	168	0.80%	▼51.60
Independent	Sohan Lal	112	0.54%	New
Margin of victory		1,528	7.30%	▼11.22
Turnout		20,929	65.74%	▲1.76
Registered electors		32,353		▲16.74
INC gain from JP		Swing	▼3.14	

=== Assembly Election 1977 ===
1977 Himachal Pradesh Legislative Assembly election: Dharampur
Party	Candidate	Votes	%	±%
JP	Om Chand	9,139	52.40%	New
INC	Bhikham Ram	5,908	33.87%	▼7.18
Independent	Mehar Chand	1,822	10.45%	New
Independent	Mohan Lal	382	2.19%	New
Independent	Mehar Chand Hawan	190	1.09%	New
Margin of victory		3,231	18.53%	▲10.45
Turnout		17,441	63.79%	▲14.19
Registered electors		27,714		▲3.20
JP gain from Independent		Swing	▲3.27	

=== Assembly Election 1972 ===
1972 Himachal Pradesh Legislative Assembly election: Dharampur
Party	Candidate	Votes	%	±%
Independent	Bhikham Ram	6,431	49.13%	New
INC	Kashmir Singh	5,374	41.06%	▼5.6
LRP	Om Chand	730	5.58%	New
Independent	Sant Ram	281	2.15%	New
Independent	Khazan Singh	273	2.09%	New
Margin of victory		1,057	8.08%	▼10.21
Turnout		13,089	50.63%	▲8.68
Registered electors		26,854		▼16.06
Independent gain from INC		Swing	▲2.47	

=== Assembly Election 1967 ===
1967 Himachal Pradesh Legislative Assembly election: Dharampur
Party	Candidate	Votes	%	±%
INC	K. Singh	5,980	46.66%	New
Independent	K. Singh	3,636	28.37%	New
Independent	N. Singh	1,399	10.92%	New
ABJS	D. Singh	744	5.81%	New
Independent	J. Chand	737	5.75%	New
Independent	S. Singh	320	2.50%	New
Margin of victory		2,344	18.29%	
Turnout		12,816	43.36%	
Registered electors		31,990		
INC win (new seat)				

== See also ==
- List of constituencies of the Himachal Pradesh Legislative Assembly
