= Surender Shourie =

Indian politician (born 1980)

Surender Shourie (born 20 November 1980) is an Indian politician from Himachal Pradesh. He is a member of the Himachal Pradesh Legislative Assembly representing the Banjar Assembly constituency in Kullu district. He won the 2022 Himachal Pradesh Legislative Assembly election representing the Bharatiya Janata Party.

== Early life and education ==
Shourie was born in Khundan, Banjar tehsil, Kullu district, Himachal Pradesh. He married Kirti Shourie and together they have two sons. He completed his BA in 2008 at a college affiliated with Himachal Pradesh University.

== Career ==
Shourie won from Banjar Assembly constituency representing the Bharatiya Janata Party in the 2022 Himachal Pradesh Legislative Assembly election. He polled 25,038 votes and defeated his nearest rival, Khimi Ram of the Indian National Congress, by a margin of 4,334 votes. He became an MLA for the first time winning the 2017 Himachal Pradesh Legislative Assembly election defeating Aditya Vikram Singh of the Congress, by a margin of 3,240 votes.
