= Rajinder Garg =

Indian horticulturalist and politician (born 1966)

State Minister of Food, Civil Supplies, and Consumer Affairs
- In office 30 July 2020 – 8 December 2022
- Chief Minister: Jai Ram Thakur
- Preceded by: Kishan Kapoor

Member of the Himachal Pradesh Legislative Assembly
- In office 18 December 2017 – 8 December 2022
- Preceded by: Rajesh Dharmani
- Succeeded by: Rajesh Dharmani
- Constituency: Ghumarwin

Personal details
- Born: 30 May 1966 (age 60) Thandora, Himachal Pradesh, India
- Party: Bharatiya Janata Party
- Spouse: Raj Kumari
- Children: 2
- Education: Himachal Pradesh University; Jiwaji University (MS)

Rajinder Garg (born 30 May 1966) is an Indian horticulturalist and politician who served in the Himachal Pradesh Legislative Assembly from 2017 until 2022, representing the Ghumarwin constituency. A member of the Bharatiya Janata Party, Garg has served as the state's Minister of Food, Civil Supplies, and Consumer Affairs from 2020 until 2022.

== Biography ==
Rajinder Garg was born on 30 May 1966 in the village of Thandora in Himachal Pradesh. Garg attended Himachal Pradesh University and Jiwaji University, receiving a master's degree in botany from the latter in 1990. After graduating, Garg worked as a horticulturalist and businessman.

In 1982, Garg became a member of the Rashtriya Swayamsevak Sangh, a Hindu nationalist paramilitary group. The following year, he joined its student organization, Akhil Bharatiya Vidyarthi Parishad, and became a local leader for the ABVP, serving as its chairman in the Bilaspur district from 1986 to 1987. Garg served as the ABVP's secretary in Himachal Pradesh from 1987 until 1988, and as its secretary in Madhya Pradesh from 1990 until 1997. In 2000, Garg became a local journalist for the Dainik Bhaskar newspaper. Garg worked at Dainik Bhaskar until 2006, when he became the chairman of a Bharatiya Janata Party training camp, serving until 2010. From 2006 until 2010, Garg also served as a member of the Himachal Pradesh Board of School Education and the Himachal Pradesh Board of Technical Education.

In the 2012 election, Garg stood as a BJP candidate for the Himachal Pradesh Legislative Assembly, running in the Ghumarwin Assembly constituency against incumbent MLA Rajesh Dharmani of the Indian National Congress. Garg was defeated by Dharmani, receiving 19,464 votes to Dharmani's 22,672. In the 2017 election, Garg defeated Dharmani in a rematch, receiving 34,846 votes compared to Dharmani's 24,411.

On 30 July 2020, Garg was appointed the state's Minister of Food, Civil Supplies, and Consumer Affairs by Jai Ram Thakur, the chief minister of Himachal Pradesh. Garg's appointment was seen as a surprise due to the short length of his tenure and other senior MLAs not having ministerial positions. The Tribune suggested that Garg may have been selected due to his prior affiliation with RSS and his residency in the Bilaspur district, where J. P. Nadda, the national president of the BJP, is also from. During his tenure as minister, Garg oversaw the completion of a project which would provide free liquefied petroleum gas connections to every house in the state.

Garg ran for re-election in the 2022 election, again facing Dharmani. Zee News considered the race to be very competitive due to the INC's historical strength in the district and local outreach efforts made by the BJP. Garg was defeated by Dharmani, receiving 29,767 votes compared to Dharmani's 35,378.
