= Kewal Singh Pathania =

Indian politician

Kewal Singh Pathania (born 1969) is an Indian politician from Himachal Pradesh. He is an MLA from Shahpur Assembly constituency in Kangra district. He won the 2022 Himachal Pradesh Legislative Assembly election representing the Indian National Congress.

== Early life and education ==
Pathania is from Shahpur, Kangra district, Himachal Pradesh. He is the son of late Karam Singh. He completed his MA in political science in 1994 and LLB in 1998 at Himachal Pradesh University. His wife is a government employee. He was a former state hockey player.

== Career ==
Pathania started his political career in 1987 in National Students Union of India. He was the college president at Government Post Graduate College, Dharamshala from 1987 to 1991. He also served the State Congress Committee as an office-bearer.

He won from Shahpur Assembly constituency representing the Indian National Congress in the 2022 Himachal Pradesh Legislative Assembly election. He polled 36,603 votes and defeated his nearest rival, Sarveen Choudhary of the Bharatiya Janata Party, by a margin of 12,243 votes. In July 2024, he became the deputy chief whip of the Congress Party.
