= Shahpur Assembly constituency =

Shahpur Assembly constituency may refer to:

- Shahpur, Bihar Assembly constituency
- Shahpur, Himachal Pradesh Assembly constituency
- Shahapur, Karnataka Assembly constituency
