= Kalga (disambiguation) =

Kalga is a rural locality in Russia.

Kalga may also refer to:

- Kalga, Himachal Pradesh, a village in the state of Himachal Pradesh, India
- Kalga (title), second in command and designated heir to the Khan in the Crimean Khanate
