= Manali Assembly constituency =

Legislative Assembly constituency in Himachal Pradesh State, India

Coordinates: 32.24°N 77.19°E

Manali
- Constituency No. 22 for the Himachal Pradesh Legislative Assembly

Constituency details
- Country: India
- Region: North India
- State: Himachal Pradesh
- District: Kullu
- Lok Sabha constituency: Mandi
- Established: 2008
- Total electors: 74,903
- Reservation: None

Member of Legislative Assembly
- 14th Himachal Pradesh Legislative Assembly
- Incumbent Bhuvneshwar Gaur
- Party: Indian National Congress
- Elected year: 2022

Manali Assembly constituency is one of the 68 constituencies in the Himachal Pradesh Legislative Assembly of Himachal Pradesh a northern state of India. Manali is also part of Mandi Lok Sabha constituency.

== Members of Legislative Assembly ==
Year	Member	Picture	Party
2012	Govind Singh Thakur		Bharatiya Janata Party
2017	Govind Singh Thakur		Bharatiya Janata Party
2022	Bhuvneshwar Gaur		Indian National Congress

== Election results ==
=== Assembly Election 2022 ===
2022 Himachal Pradesh Legislative Assembly election: Manali
Party	Candidate	Votes	%	±%
INC	Bhuvneshwar Gaur	29,892	49.46%	▲4.34
BJP	Govind Singh Thakur	26,935	44.57%	▼6.16
Independent	Mahinder Singh	1,345	2.23%	New
Rashtriya Devbhumi Party	Amar Chand	997	1.65%	New
AAP	Anurag Prarthi	730	1.21%	New
BSP	Tara Chand	300	0.50%	▼0.22
NOTA	Nota	238	0.39%	▼0.21
Margin of victory		2,957	4.89%	▼0.72
Turnout		60,437	80.69%	▲0.08
Registered electors		74,903		▲12.72
INC gain from BJP		Swing	▼1.27	

=== Assembly Election 2017 ===
2017 Himachal Pradesh Legislative Assembly election: Manali
Party	Candidate	Votes	%	±%
BJP	Govind Singh Thakur	27,173	50.73%	▲14.75
INC	Hari Chand Sharma	24,168	45.12%	▲15.66
Independent	Gajender Thakur	1,070	2.00%	New
BSP	Jit Ram	385	0.72%	▼0.11
NOTA	None of the Above	323	0.60%	New
Margin of victory		3,005	5.61%	▼0.91
Turnout		53,564	80.61%	▼0.04
Registered electors		66,452		▲9.26
BJP hold		Swing	▲14.75	

=== Assembly Election 2012 ===
2012 Himachal Pradesh Legislative Assembly election: Manali
Party	Candidate	Votes	%	±%
BJP	Govind Singh Thakur	17,645	35.98%	New
INC	Bhuvneshwar Gaur	14,447	29.46%	New
Independent	Dharam Vir Dhami	14,346	29.25%	New
HLC	Bir Chand	1,840	3.75%	New
BSP	Jeet Ram	407	0.83%	New
IJP	Budh Ram	300	0.61%	New
Margin of victory		3,198	6.52%	
Turnout		49,044	80.64%	
Registered electors		60,818		
BJP win (new seat)				

== See also ==
- Kullu district
- List of constituencies of the Himachal Pradesh Legislative Assembly
