= Chander Shekhar Thakur =

Indian politician

Chander Shekhar Thakur (born 1973) is an Indian politician from Himachal Pradesh. He is an MLA from Dharampur Assembly constituency in Mandi District. He won the 2022 Himachal Pradesh Legislative Assembly election representing the Indian National Congress.

== Early life and education ==
Thakur is from Dharampur, Mandi District, Himachal Pradesh. He is the son of Kahan Singh Thakur. He completed his Bachelor of Science and Bachelor of Law at Himachal Pradesh University, Shimla.

== Career ==
Thakur won from Dharampur Assembly constituency representing the Indian National Congress in the 2022 Himachal Pradesh Legislative Assembly election. He polled 31,063 votes and defeated his nearest rival and the son of former minister Mahender Singh Thakur, Rajat Thakur of the Bharatiya Janata Party, by a margin of 3,026 votes. Earlier, he first contested from Dharampur seat on Congress ticket and lost in the 2007 Himachal Pradesh Legislative Assembly election. Later, he also lost the next two assembly election in 2012 and 2017. However, he won the 2022 election in his fourth attempt and ended the reign of the Bharatiya Janata Party.
