= Pulga, Himachal Pradesh =

Village in Himachal Pradesh

Pulga पुल्गा
- Village
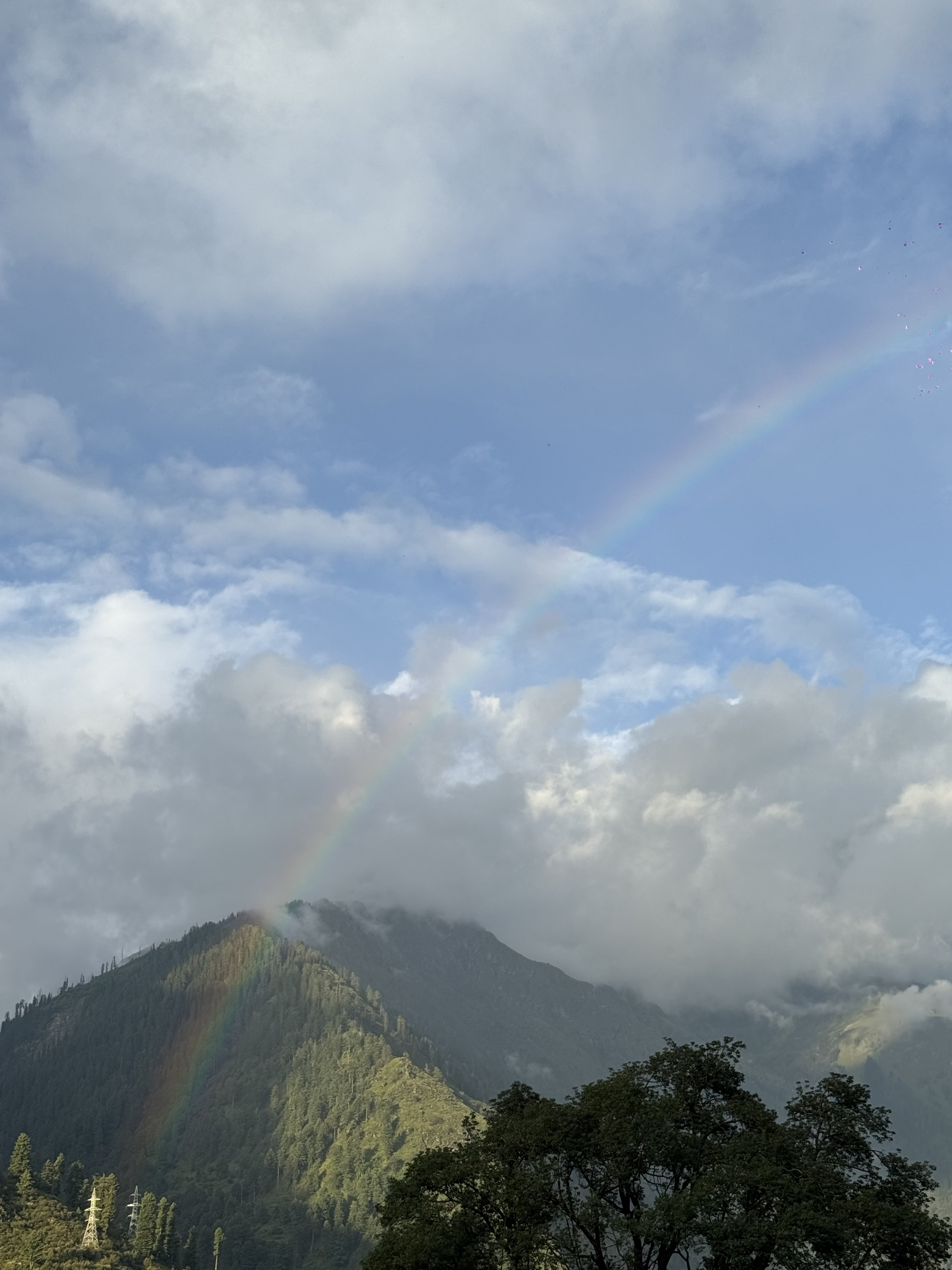
- View of Pulga village in Parvati Valley
- Interactive map of Pulga
- Coordinates: 31°59′43″N 77°26′23″E
- Elevation: 2,210 m (7,250 ft)
- Time zone: UTC+5:30 (IST)
- PIN: 175105

Pulga (Hindi: पुल्गा) is a small village in the Parvati Valley, Kullu District, Himachal Pradesh, India, known for its scenic beauty, traditional wooden houses, and tranquil atmosphere. Located at an altitude of 2,210 meters (7,250 feet), it is a popular destination for backpackers and trekkers seeking an offbeat retreat in the Himalayas.

== Geography ==
Pulga

Pulga is situated approximately 3 km from Barshaini, accessible only by a 15–40-minute trek across the Parvati River. It lies near the villages of Kalga and Tulga, forming a trio of settlements in the Parvati Valley. The village is surrounded by dense deodar forests, known locally as the Fairy Forest, and offers panoramic views of snow-capped Himalayan peaks, including Chandrakhani and Deotibba. Its coordinates are approximately 32.043°N, 77.383°E, and it falls within the postal code 175105.

== In popular culture ==
Pulga has been featured in travel media, including articles in Times of India and Outlook Traveller, which highlight its role as a "hidden gem" in the Parvati Valley.
