= Sarveen Choudhary =

Indian politician

Cabinet Minister, Government of Himachal Pradesh
- In office 27 December 2017 – 8 December 2022
- Governor: Acharya Devvrat; Kalraj Mishra; Bandaru Dattatreya; Rajendra Arlekar
- Cabinet: Jai Ram Thakur ministry
- Chief Minister: Jai Ram Thakur
- Ministry and Departments: Social Justice & Empowerment; Urban Development; Housing; Town & Country Planning

Member of the Himachal Pradesh Legislative Assembly
- In office 31 December 2007 – 8 December 2022
- Preceded by: Vijai Singh Mankotia
- Succeeded by: Kewal Singh
- Constituency: Shahpur
- In office 28 February 1998 – 26 February 2003
- Preceded by: Ram Rattan
- Succeeded by: Vijai Singh Mankotia
- Constituency: Shahpur

Personal details
- Born: 21 January 1966 (age 60)
- Party: Bharatiya Janata Party

Sarveen Choudhary (born 1966) is an Indian politician, from the northern state of Himachal Pradesh. She is an MLA from Shahpur. She is the cabinet minister in Bharatiya Janata Party ministry in Himachal Pradesh holding Urban, Town & Country Planning departments. In Dhumal Government she was minister of Social Justice and empowerment. She was elected to Himachal Pradesh Assembly from Kangra. She is elected from Shahpur Vidhansabha constituency.

She took part in Nehru Yuva Kendra and N.S.S. activities during student life; participated in folk dance competitions at National and International level; and remained best Folk Dancer, Punjab University for five years.

Active worker, R.S.S.; entered politics in the year 1992; remained Mandal Pradhan, Mahila Morcha, B.J.P., 1992–94; Member, State Executive B.J.P. since 1993; and President, Bhartiya Janata Party, Kangra district, 1995–97. Elected to State Legislative Assembly in 1998; re-elected in 2007; remained Parliamentary Secretary, 03-11-1998 to March 2003; Minister for Social Justice & Empowerment from 09-01-2008 to December 2013.

She was elected to the State Legislative Assembly for a fourth time in December 2017.
