= Fifth Virbhadra Singh ministry =

- Ministry of Himachal Pradesh
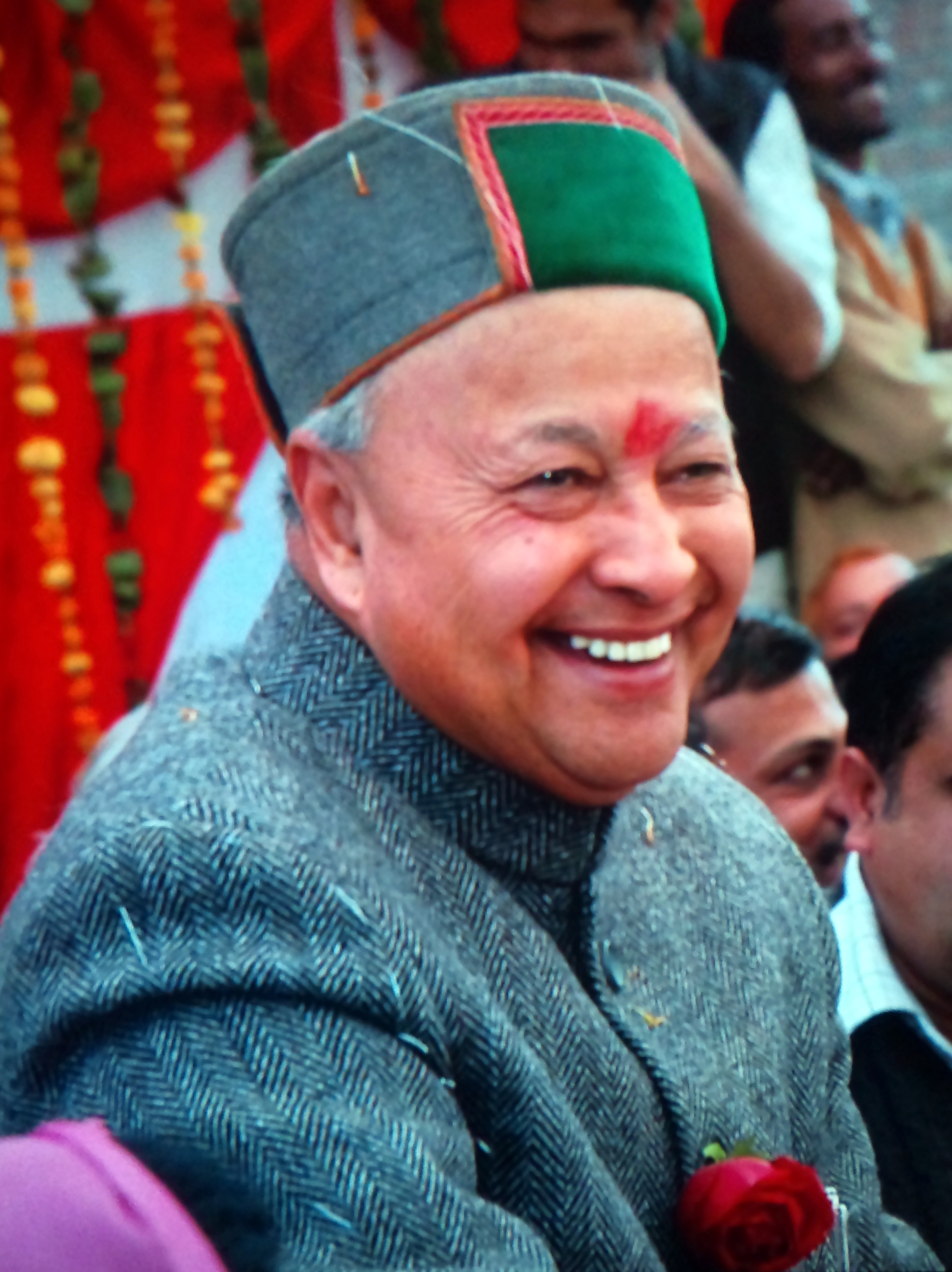
- Date formed: 25 December 2012
- Date dissolved: 27 December 2017

People and organisations
- Governor: Urmila Singh (25 December 2012 – 28 January 2015); Kalyan Singh (28 January 2015 – 12 August 2015); Acharya Devvrat (12 August 2015 - 27 December 2017)
- Chief Minister: Virbhadra Singh
- No. of ministers: 12
- Member parties: INC
- Status in legislature: Majority
- Opposition party: BJP
- Opposition leader: Prem Kumar Dhumal

History
- Election: 2012
- Legislature terms: 5 years, 2 days
- Predecessor: Second Dhumal ministry
- Successor: Jai Ram Thakur ministry

Virbhadra Singh, the leader of INC was sworn in as the chief minister of Himachal Pradesh on 25 December 2012.

== Council of Ministers ==
Portfolio	Minister	Took office	Left office	Party
Chief Minister: Finance; Home; General Administration; Planning; Personnel; Education; Tourism; All other departments not allotted to any other Minister	Virbhadra Singh	25 December 2012	27 December 2017	INC
Minister of: Irrigation; Public Health; Horticulture; Information Technology	Vidya Stokes	25 December 2012	27 December 2017	INC
Minister of: Revenue; Health & Family Welfare; Law	Kaul Singh Thakur	25 December 2012	27 December 2017	INC
Minister of: Food & Civil Supplies; Consumer Affairs; Transport; Technical Education	G. S. Bali	25 December 2012	27 December 2017	INC
Minister of: Agriculture; Multipurpose Projects; Power; Non Conventional Energy	Sujan Singh Pathania	25 December 2012	27 December 2017	INC
Minister of: Forests; Fisheries	Thakur Singh Bharmouri	25 December 2012	27 December 2017	INC
Minister of: Industries; Labour and Employment; Parliamentary Affairs; Information and Public Relations	Mukesh Agnihotri	25 December 2012	27 December 2017	INC
Minister of: Urban Development; Housing and Town & Country Planning	Sudhir Sharma	25 December 2012	27 December 2017	INC
Minister of: Excise & Taxation; Printing & Stationary	Prakash Chaudhary	25 December 2012	27 December 2017	INC
Minister of: Social Justice and Empowerment; Sainik Welfare	Dhani Ram Shandil	25 December 2012	27 December 2017	INC
Minister of: Rural Development & Panchayati Raj; Animal Husbandry	Anil Sharma	2 March 2013	15 October 2017	INC
Minister of: Ayurveda; Cooperation	Karan Singh	27 August 2015	27 December 2017	INC
