= Him Loktantrik Morcha =

Him Loktantrik Morcha was a political front in the Indian state of Himachal Pradesh. HLM was formed ahead of the 2002 Shimla Municipal Corporation elections, as an alternative to both Indian National Congress and Bharatiya Janata Party. The convenor of HLM was Mohinder Singh Chaudhury. The front consisted of Communist Party of India (Marxist), the Janata Dal (Secular), the Lok Janshakti Party, the Samajwadi Party and a few secular regional parties.

Following dissatisfaction over Singh's move to make HLM into a political party, Samajwadi Party, Samajwadi Janata Party (Rashtriya) and Janata Dal (Secular) formed the Himachal Jan Morcha (Himalayan People's Front) in October 2002.

Singh later registered Loktantrik Morcha (Himachal Pradesh) as a political party. They won one seat in the Shimla Municipal Corporation election in April 2002. He fell apart from Himachal Jan Morcha.
