= Rajesh Dharmani =

Indian politician

Cabinet Minister Government of Himachal Pradesh
- Incumbent
- Assumed office 12 December 2023
- Governor: Rajendra Arlekar (2022–2023); Shiv Pratap Shukla (2023–2026); Kavinder Gupta (2026–present)
- Cabinet: Sukhu ministry
- Chief minister: Sukhvinder Singh Sukhu
- Ministry and Departments: Technical education; Vocational and industrial training

Member of the Himachal Pradesh Legislative Assembly
- Incumbent
- Assumed office 8 December 2022
- Preceded by: Rajinder Garg
- Constituency: Ghumarwin
- In office 2007–2017
- Preceded by: Karam Dev Dharmani
- Succeeded by: Rajinder Garg
- Constituency: Ghumarwin

Personal details
- Born: 2 April 1972 (age 54) Ghumarwin, Bilaspur, Himachal Pradesh
- Party: Indian National Congress
- Occupation: Politician, engineer, agriculturist

Rajesh Dharmani (born 2 April 1972) is an Indian politician from Himachal Pradesh. He is current member of Himachal Pradesh Legislative Assembly from Ghumarwin and cabinet minister in Government of Himachal Pradesh, India.
