= Ghumarwin Assembly constituency =

Legislative Assembly constituency in Himachal Pradesh State, India

Coordinates: 31.45°N 76.7°E

Ghumarwin
- Constituency No. 47 for the Himachal Pradesh Legislative Assembly

Constituency details
- Country: India
- Region: North India
- State: Himachal Pradesh
- District: Bilaspur
- Lok Sabha constituency: Hamirpur
- Established: 1967
- Total electors: 90,144
- Reservation: None

Member of Legislative Assembly
- 14th Himachal Pradesh Legislative Assembly
- Incumbent Rajesh Dharmani
- Party: Indian National Congress
- Elected year: 2022

Ghumarwin Assembly constituency is one of the 68 constituencies in the Himachal Pradesh Legislative Assembly of Himachal Pradesh, a northern state of India. Ghumarwin is also part of Hamirpur, Himachal Pradesh Lok Sabha constituency.

== Members of the Legislative Assembly ==
Year	Member	Party
1967	K. Singh	Indian National Congress
1972	Sita Ram	Indian National Congress
1977	Narayan Singh Swami	Janata Party
1982	Narayan Singh Swami	Bharatiya Janata Party
1985	Kashmir Singh	Indian National Congress
1990	Karam Dev Dharmani	Bharatiya Janata Party
1993	Kashmir Singh	Indian National Congress
1998	Kashmir Singh	Indian National Congress
2003	Karam Dev Dharmani	Bharatiya Janata Party
2007	Rajesh Dharmani	Indian National Congress
2012	Rajesh Dharmani	Indian National Congress
2017	Rajinder Garg	Bharatiya Janata Party
2022	Rajesh Dharmani	Indian National Congress

== Election results ==
=== Assembly Election 2022 ===
2022 Himachal Pradesh Legislative Assembly election: Ghumarwin
Party	Candidate	Votes	%	±%
INC	Rajesh Dharmani	35,378	51.96%	▲12.20
BJP	Rajinder Garg	29,767	43.72%	▼13.04
AAP	Rakesh Kumar Chopra	1,633	2.40%	New
Rashtriya Devbhumi Party	Yogesh Thakur	467	0.69%	New
BSP	Prem Lal Banga	319	0.47%	New
NOTA	Nota	242	0.36%	▼0.28
Independent	Manohar Lal	128	0.19%	New
Independent	Varun Kumar Thakur	89	0.13%	New
Independent	Nand Lal	69	0.10%	New
Margin of victory		5,611	8.24%	▼8.76
Turnout		68,092	75.54%	▲0.17
Registered electors		90,144		▲10.66
INC gain from BJP		Swing	▼4.80	

=== Assembly Election 2017 ===
2017 Himachal Pradesh Legislative Assembly election: Ghumarwin
Party	Candidate	Votes	%	±%
BJP	Rajinder Garg	34,846	56.76%	▲19.68
INC	Rajesh Dharmani	24,411	39.76%	▼3.43
Independent	Suresh Kumar	475	0.77%	New
NOTA	None of the Above	390	0.64%	New
Margin of victory		10,435	17.00%	▲10.88
Turnout		61,395	75.37%	▲5.77
Registered electors		81,460		▲8.02
BJP gain from INC		Swing	▲13.56	

=== Assembly Election 2012 ===
2012 Himachal Pradesh Legislative Assembly election: Ghumarwin
Party	Candidate	Votes	%	±%
INC	Rajesh Dharmani	22,672	43.19%	▼6.59
BJP	Rajinder Garg	19,464	37.08%	▼8.73
Independent	Rakesh Kumar Chopra	6,664	12.70%	New
Independent	Kashmir Singh	1,603	3.05%	New
HLC	Karam Dev Dharmani	983	1.87%	New
AITC	Nand Lal	433	0.82%	New
BSP	Jitender	408	0.78%	New
Margin of victory		3,208	6.11%	▲2.14
Turnout		52,491	69.60%	▲4.05
Registered electors		75,415		▲1.72
INC hold		Swing	▼6.59	

=== Assembly Election 2007 ===
2007 Himachal Pradesh Legislative Assembly election: Ghumarwin
Party	Candidate	Votes	%	±%
INC	Rajesh Dharmani	24,194	49.78%	▲13.81
BJP	Karam Dev Dharmani	22,263	45.81%	▲2.72
Independent	Naveen Kumar	1,135	2.34%	New
Independent	Budhi Singh Chauhan	446	0.92%	New
LJP	Shri Ram	350	0.72%	▼0.85
Margin of victory		1,931	3.97%	▼3.15
Turnout		48,597	65.55%	▼6.73
Registered electors		74,139		▲12.05
INC gain from BJP		Swing	▲6.69	

=== Assembly Election 2003 ===
2003 Himachal Pradesh Legislative Assembly election: Ghumarwin
Party	Candidate	Votes	%	±%
BJP	Karam Dev Dharmani	20,609	43.10%	▲2.30
INC	Kashmir Singh	17,202	35.97%	▼8.63
HVC	Gian Chand Rattan	8,736	18.27%	▲5.67
LJP	Zulfikar Ali Bhutto	749	1.57%	New
BSP	Dharam Singh	525	1.10%	▲0.42
Margin of victory		3,407	7.12%	▲3.33
Turnout		47,821	72.34%	▲1.61
Registered electors		66,165		▲15.42
BJP gain from INC		Swing	▼1.50	

=== Assembly Election 1998 ===
1998 Himachal Pradesh Legislative Assembly election: Ghumarwin
Party	Candidate	Votes	%	±%
INC	Kashmir Singh	18,066	44.60%	▼11.85
BJP	Karam Dev Dharmani	16,527	40.80%	▼0.35
HVC	Gian Chand Rattan	5,105	12.60%	New
Independent	Pavna	536	1.32%	New
BSP	Jamnadevi Alias Meera Devi	273	0.67%	New
Margin of victory		1,539	3.80%	▼11.50
Turnout		40,507	71.41%	▼1.46
Registered electors		57,326		▲13.29
INC hold		Swing	▼11.85	

=== Assembly Election 1993 ===
1993 Himachal Pradesh Legislative Assembly election: Ghumarwin
Party	Candidate	Votes	%	±%
INC	Kashmir Singh	20,603	56.45%	▲21.70
BJP	Karam Dev Dharmani	15,019	41.15%	▼11.21
CPI	Zulfikar Ali Bhutto	725	1.99%	▼1.08
Margin of victory		5,584	15.30%	▼2.31
Turnout		36,496	72.53%	▲4.76
Registered electors		50,602		▲9.25
INC gain from BJP		Swing		

=== Assembly Election 1990 ===
1990 Himachal Pradesh Legislative Assembly election: Ghumarwin
Party	Candidate	Votes	%	±%
BJP	Karam Dev Dharmani	16,336	52.36%	▲10.91
INC	Kashmir Singh	10,843	34.75%	▼19.16
Independent	Naryana Singh Swami	1,795	5.75%	New
CPI	Zulfikar Ali Bhutto	957	3.07%	New
BSP	Gorakh Ram	761	2.44%	New
Independent	Ramnath Shastri	293	0.94%	New
Margin of victory		5,493	17.61%	▲5.14
Turnout		31,200	68.01%	▼5.29
Registered electors		46,318		▲32.47
BJP gain from INC		Swing	▼1.55	

=== Assembly Election 1985 ===
1985 Himachal Pradesh Legislative Assembly election: Ghumarwin
Party	Candidate	Votes	%	±%
INC	Kashmir Singh	13,694	53.91%	▲6.93
BJP	Jagdish Ram Sharma	10,528	41.45%	▼7.55
Independent	Roop Singh	469	1.85%	New
Independent	Narayan Singh Swami	425	1.67%	New
Independent	Gorkh Ram	162	0.64%	New
Margin of victory		3,166	12.46%	▲10.45
Turnout		25,402	73.19%	▼0.88
Registered electors		34,964		▲6.41
INC gain from BJP		Swing	▲4.92	

=== Assembly Election 1982 ===
1982 Himachal Pradesh Legislative Assembly election: Ghumarwin
Party	Candidate	Votes	%	±%
BJP	Narayan Singh Swami	11,836	48.99%	New
INC	Sita Ram	11,350	46.98%	▲7.51
Independent	Daya Ram	321	1.33%	New
JP	Narottam Dutt	250	1.03%	▼56.11
LKD	Mahant Ram	172	0.71%	New
Margin of victory		486	2.01%	▼15.66
Turnout		24,159	74.33%	▲8.89
Registered electors		32,857		▲8.47
BJP gain from JP		Swing	▼8.15	

=== Assembly Election 1977 ===
1977 Himachal Pradesh Legislative Assembly election: Ghumarwin
Party	Candidate	Votes	%	±%
JP	Narayan Singh Swami	11,188	57.14%	New
INC	Sita Ram	7,728	39.47%	▼25.97
Independent	Daya Ram	664	3.39%	New
Margin of victory		3,460	17.67%	▼22.22
Turnout		19,580	65.58%	▲19.61
Registered electors		30,292		▲6.64
JP gain from INC		Swing	▼8.30	

=== Assembly Election 1972 ===
1972 Himachal Pradesh Legislative Assembly election: Ghumarwin
Party	Candidate	Votes	%	±%
INC	Sita Ram	8,370	65.44%	▲19.57
Independent	Ram Singh	3,267	25.54%	New
ABJS	Jeet Ram	575	4.50%	▼37.85
Independent	Garditu	301	2.35%	New
Independent	Om Prakash	278	2.17%	New
Margin of victory		5,103	39.90%	▲36.38
Turnout		12,791	46.44%	▲0.25
Registered electors		28,405		▼4.20
INC hold		Swing	▲19.57	

=== Assembly Election 1967 ===
1967 Himachal Pradesh Legislative Assembly election: Ghumarwin
Party	Candidate	Votes	%	±%
INC	K. Singh	6,090	45.87%	New
ABJS	J. Ram	5,623	42.35%	New
Independent	K. Ram	1,416	10.66%	New
Independent	J. Nand	149	1.12%	New
Margin of victory		467	3.52%	
Turnout		13,278	48.42%	
Registered electors		29,649		
INC win (new seat)				

== See also ==
- Ghumarwin
- Bilaspur district, Himachal Pradesh
- List of constituencies of Himachal Pradesh Legislative Assembly
