= Govind Singh Thakur =

Indian politician

Cabinet Minister, Government of Himachal Pradesh
- In office 27 December 2017 – 8 December 2022
- Governor: Acharya Devvrat; Kalraj Mishra; Bandaru Dattatreya; Rajendra Arlekar
- Cabinet: Jai Ram Thakur ministry
- Chief Minister: Jai Ram Thakur
- Ministry and Departments: Language Art & Culture; Education; Forest; Transport

Member of the Himachal Pradesh Legislative Assembly
- In office 20 December 2012 – 8 December 2022
- Preceded by: Constituency Established
- Succeeded by: Bhuvneshvar Gaur
- Constituency: Manali

Personal details
- Born: Govind Singh Thakur (Hindu); 3 October 1968 (age 57) Kanyal, Manali, Himachal Pradesh
- Party: Bharatiya Janata Party
- Spouse: Rajni Thakur (Hindu)
- Children: Two sons
- Parent: Kunj Lal Thakur (father)
- Education: B.A.
- Alma mater: Govt Degree College, Kullu
- Profession: Agriculturist

Govind Singh Thakur is an Indian politician. He was elected to the Himachal Pradesh Legislative Assembly from Manali in the 2007, 2012 and 2017 Himachal Pradesh Legislative Assembly election as a member of the Bharatiya Janata Party. He held the chair as Minister of Forest, Transport, Youth Services and Sports till 31 July 2020, he was Education & Language and Culture Minister in Jai Ram Thakur cabinet.
