= Shahpur, Himachal Pradesh Assembly constituency =

Legislative Assembly constituency in Himachal Pradesh State, India

Coordinates: 32.22°N 76.18°E

Shahpur
- Constituency No. 17 for the Himachal Pradesh Legislative Assembly

Constituency details
- Country: India
- Region: North India
- State: Himachal Pradesh
- District: Kangra
- Lok Sabha constituency: Kangra
- Established: 1972
- Total electors: 89,978
- Reservation: None

Member of Legislative Assembly
- 14th Himachal Pradesh Legislative Assembly
- Incumbent Kewal Singh Pathania
- Party: Indian National Congress
- Elected year: 2022

Shahpur Assembly constituency is one of the 68 constituencies in the Himachal Pradesh Legislative Assembly of Himachal Pradesh a northern state of India. Shahpur is also part of Kangra Lok Sabha constituency.

== Members of Legislative Assembly ==
Year	Member	Picture	Party
1972	Kultar Chand Rana		Indian National Congress
1977	Ram Rattan		Janata Party
1982	Vijai Singh Mankotia		Independent
1985	Vijai Singh Mankotia		Indian National Congress
1990	Vijai Singh Mankotia		Janata Dal
1993	Vijai Singh Mankotia		Indian National Congress
1998	Sarveen Choudhary		Bharatiya Janata Party
2003	Vijai Singh Mankotia		Indian National Congress
2007	Sarveen Choudhary		Bharatiya Janata Party
2012	Sarveen Choudhary		Bharatiya Janata Party
2017	Sarveen Choudhary		Bharatiya Janata Party
2022	Kewal Singh Pathania		Indian National Congress

== Election results ==
=== Assembly Election 2022 ===
2022 Himachal Pradesh Legislative Assembly election: Shahpur
Party	Candidate	Votes	%	±%
INC	Kewal Singh Pathania	36,603	55.39%	▲28.58
BJP	Sarveen Choudhary	24,360	36.86%	▼1.06
Independent	Joginder Singh (Panku Kangdia)	2,298	3.48%	New
AAP	Abhishek Singh	1,576	2.38%	New
NOTA	Nota	519	0.79%	▼0.87
Independent	Ramesh Gautam	330	0.50%	New
BSP	Banarshi Dass Dogra	306	0.46%	▼0.38
Hindu Samaj Party	Ashish Sharma	96	0.15%	New
Margin of victory		12,243	18.53%	▲8.44
Turnout		66,088	73.45%	▼2.61
Registered electors		89,978		▲12.34
INC gain from BJP		Swing	▲17.46	

=== Assembly Election 2017 ===
2017 Himachal Pradesh Legislative Assembly election: Shahpur
Party	Candidate	Votes	%	±%
BJP	Sarveen Choudhary	23,104	37.92%	▼10.37
Independent	Major Vijay Singh Mankotia	16,957	27.83%	New
INC	Kewal Singh Pathania	16,333	26.81%	▼15.57
Independent	Ramesh Kumar	1,111	1.82%	New
Independent	Desh Raj Chaudhary	1,108	1.82%	New
NOTA	None of the Above	1,010	1.66%	New
BSP	Banarshi Dass Dogra	516	0.85%	▼0.23
Margin of victory		6,147	10.09%	▲4.17
Turnout		60,924	76.06%	▲3.36
Registered electors		80,097		▲10.34
BJP hold		Swing	▼10.37	

=== Assembly Election 2012 ===
2012 Himachal Pradesh Legislative Assembly election: Shahpur
Party	Candidate	Votes	%	±%
BJP	Sarveen Choudhary	25,487	48.29%	▼0.76
INC	Vijai Singh Mankotia	22,364	42.38%	▲28.30
Independent	Nand Lal	1,814	3.44%	New
HLC	Balbir Singh	1,750	3.32%	New
BSP	Banarshi Dass Dogra	567	1.07%	▼30.38
SP	Kushal Kumar	324	0.61%	New
LJP	Vipan Kumar	311	0.59%	▼0.61
Margin of victory		3,123	5.92%	▼11.68
Turnout		52,776	72.70%	▲0.40
Registered electors		72,593		▲2.28
BJP hold		Swing	▼0.76	

=== Assembly Election 2007 ===
2007 Himachal Pradesh Legislative Assembly election: Shahpur
Party	Candidate	Votes	%	±%
BJP	Sarveen Choudhary	25,174	49.06%	▲7.45
BSP	Onkar Singh	16,143	31.46%	New
INC	Kewal Singh Pathania	7,225	14.08%	▼36.35
Independent	Balbir Choudhary	2,119	4.13%	New
LJP	Pourush Kumar	613	1.19%	New
Margin of victory		9,031	17.60%	▲8.78
Turnout		51,315	72.30%	▼7.32
Registered electors		70,977		▲15.96
BJP gain from INC		Swing	▼1.37	

=== Assembly Election 2003 ===
2003 Himachal Pradesh Legislative Assembly election: Shahpur
Party	Candidate	Votes	%	±%
INC	Major Vijay Singh Mankotia	24,572	50.43%	▲4.62
BJP	Sarveen Choudhary	20,276	41.61%	▼11.33
Independent	Kamal Kishore	2,837	5.82%	New
SP	Ram Swaroop	636	1.31%	New
HVC	Sunil Dutt	407	0.84%	▼0.42
Margin of victory		4,296	8.82%	▲1.69
Turnout		48,728	79.66%	▲3.08
Registered electors		61,206		▲18.53
INC gain from BJP		Swing	▼2.51	

=== Assembly Election 1998 ===
1998 Himachal Pradesh Legislative Assembly election: Shahpur
Party	Candidate	Votes	%	±%
BJP	Sarveen Choudhary	20,919	52.94%	▲6.54
INC	Major Vijay Singh Mankotia	18,101	45.81%	▼4.15
HVC	Kishan Singh	497	1.26%	New
Margin of victory		2,818	7.13%	▲3.57
Turnout		39,517	77.43%	▼0.38
Registered electors		51,637		▲10.39
BJP gain from INC		Swing		

=== Assembly Election 1993 ===
1993 Himachal Pradesh Legislative Assembly election: Shahpur
Party	Candidate	Votes	%	±%
INC	Vijai Singh Mankotia	17,972	49.96%	▲8.98
BJP	Sarveen Choudhary	16,691	46.40%	New
JD	Parveen Singh	476	1.32%	▼54.05
BSP	Ram Prashad	265	0.74%	New
Independent	Narinder Singh	262	0.73%	New
	Bidhi Chand Choudhary	206	0.57%	New
Margin of victory		1,281	3.56%	▼10.83
Turnout		35,974	77.47%	▲7.35
Registered electors		46,776		▲5.17
INC gain from JD		Swing	▼5.41	

=== Assembly Election 1990 ===
1990 Himachal Pradesh Legislative Assembly election: Shahpur
Party	Candidate	Votes	%	±%
JD	Vijai Singh Mankotia	17,130	55.37%	New
INC	Ajit Paul	12,677	40.98%	▼21.46
Independent	Dwarika Prasad	317	1.02%	New
Independent	Sansar Chand Mehta	240	0.78%	New
Margin of victory		4,453	14.39%	▼12.46
Turnout		30,938	70.17%	▼3.42
Registered electors		44,477		▲27.00
JD gain from INC		Swing	▼7.06	

=== Assembly Election 1985 ===
1985 Himachal Pradesh Legislative Assembly election: Shahpur
Party	Candidate	Votes	%	±%
INC	Vijai Singh Mankotia	15,956	62.43%	▲35.92
BJP	Ram Rattan	9,094	35.58%	▲10.58
Independent	Piaju Ram	206	0.81%	New
Independent	Hans Raj	143	0.56%	New
CPI(M)	Prithvi Raj Pathania	137	0.54%	New
Margin of victory		6,862	26.85%	▲6.44
Turnout		25,558	73.54%	▼2.80
Registered electors		35,021		▲10.19
INC gain from Independent		Swing	▲15.51	

=== Assembly Election 1982 ===
1982 Himachal Pradesh Legislative Assembly election: Shahpur
Party	Candidate	Votes	%	±%
Independent	Vijai Singh Mankotia	11,301	46.92%	New
INC	Ajit Paul	6,386	26.51%	▼1.36
BJP	Ram Rattan	6,022	25.00%	New
Independent	Pawan Kumar Dogra	181	0.75%	New
Margin of victory		4,915	20.41%	▼8.75
Turnout		24,085	77.13%	▲15.51
Registered electors		31,782		▲11.34
Independent gain from JP		Swing	▼10.11	

=== Assembly Election 1977 ===
1977 Himachal Pradesh Legislative Assembly election: Shahpur
Party	Candidate	Votes	%	±%
JP	Ram Rattan	9,812	57.03%	New
INC	Kultar Chand Rana	4,796	27.88%	▼5.76
Independent	Bishan Dass	1,382	8.03%	New
Independent	Chaman Singh	1,215	7.06%	New
Margin of victory		5,016	29.15%	▲28.44
Turnout		17,205	61.37%	▲19.65
Registered electors		28,545		▲12.28
JP gain from INC		Swing	▲23.40	

=== Assembly Election 1972 ===
1972 Himachal Pradesh Legislative Assembly election: Shahpur
Party	Candidate	Votes	%	±%
INC	Kultar Chand Rana	3,474	33.63%	New
Independent	Bishan Dass	3,400	32.92%	New
Independent	Rajinder Paul	1,214	11.75%	New
Independent	Des Raj	1,052	10.18%	New
Independent	Bansi Lal	829	8.03%	New
Independent	Kuldip Singh	360	3.49%	New
Margin of victory		74	0.72%	
Turnout		10,329	42.33%	
Registered electors		25,424		
INC win (new seat)				

== See also ==
- Kangra
- List of constituencies of Himachal Pradesh Legislative Assembly
