= Mahender Singh =

Indian politician

Cabinet Minister, Government of Himachal Pradesh
- In office 27 December 2017 – 8 December 2022
- Governor: Acharya Devvrat; Kalraj Mishra; Bandaru Dattatreya; Rajendra Arlekar
- Cabinet: Jai Ram Thakur ministry
- Chief Minister: Jai Ram Thakur
- Ministry and Departments: Sainik Welfare; Horticulture; Jal Shakti; Revenue

Member of the Himachal Pradesh Legislative Assembly
- In office 27 February 1990 – 8 December 2022.
- Preceded by: Natha Singh
- Succeeded by: Chandrashekhar
- Constituency: Dharampur

Personal details
- Born: 22 February 1950 (age 76)
- Party: Bharatiya Janata Party
- Other political affiliations: Loktantrik Morcha Himachal Pradesh; Himachal Vikas Congress; Indian National Congress
- Spouse: Parmila Devi
- Parent: Bali Ram (father)

Mahender Singh (born 22 February 1950) is an Indian politician. He is a member of the Bharatiya Janata Party (BJP). Singh was a member of the Himachal Pradesh Legislative Assembly from the Dharampur constituency in Mandi district. He holds the Irrigation and public health, Horticulture and Sainik welfare portfolios.

== Early life ==
He is the son of the late Shri Bali Ram. He was born at Chanjyar (Richhli). He is married to Smt. Parmila Devi. The couple has one son and two daughters. One son Surender Shourie is an MLA from Banjar Assembly constituency.

Initially, he was involved in the construction business.

== Career ==
He was elected to the State Legislative Assembly in February 1990 as an Independent. He was reelected in 1993 with the Indian National Congress, in 1998 with H.V.C., in 2003 with Lok Tantrik Morcha (H.P.), and in 2007 with BJP.

He served as Vice President of HVC from 1997 to 2002; President, H.P Lok Tantrik Morcha, from 2003 to 2004; Minister of Rural Development, Panchayati Raj, P.W.D., and Excise & Taxation from 1998 to 2000; and chairman, Estimates Committee and Member of various House Committees. He served as Transport Minister from 9 July 2009 until December 2012. He was elected to the State Legislative Assembly for the sixth time in 2012 and again in December 2017.
