= Raj Krishan Gaur =

Indian politician

Raj Krishan Gaur (20 October 1931 - 2011) (ex- Agricultural minister from Himachal at the cabinet rank), son of B. R. Pandit, was born on 20 October 1931 at Ranghri, Kullu. He has done B.Sc. He was educated at Punjab Technical University, Jalandhar. He married Uma Gour on 5 June 1969.

He was the General Secretary of District Kullu Congress Committee, 1963. He was the President of the following committees:

- Youth Congress, Kullu, 1972 to 1977
- Congress Committee, Kullu since 1977

He was the Chairman of Bharat Sewak Samaj, Kullu from 1965 to 1972.

He got elected to the State Legislative Assembly first in 1985 and then got re-elected in 1993 and 2003. He is an eminent person in state politics.

He remained Minister of State for Tourism plus Excise and Taxation, from 1985 to 1990 and had served the state as the Agriculture Minister (at Cabinet Rank).

He died in Chandigarh in 2011.
