= Parvati Valley =

Valley in Himachal Pradesh, India

- Parvati
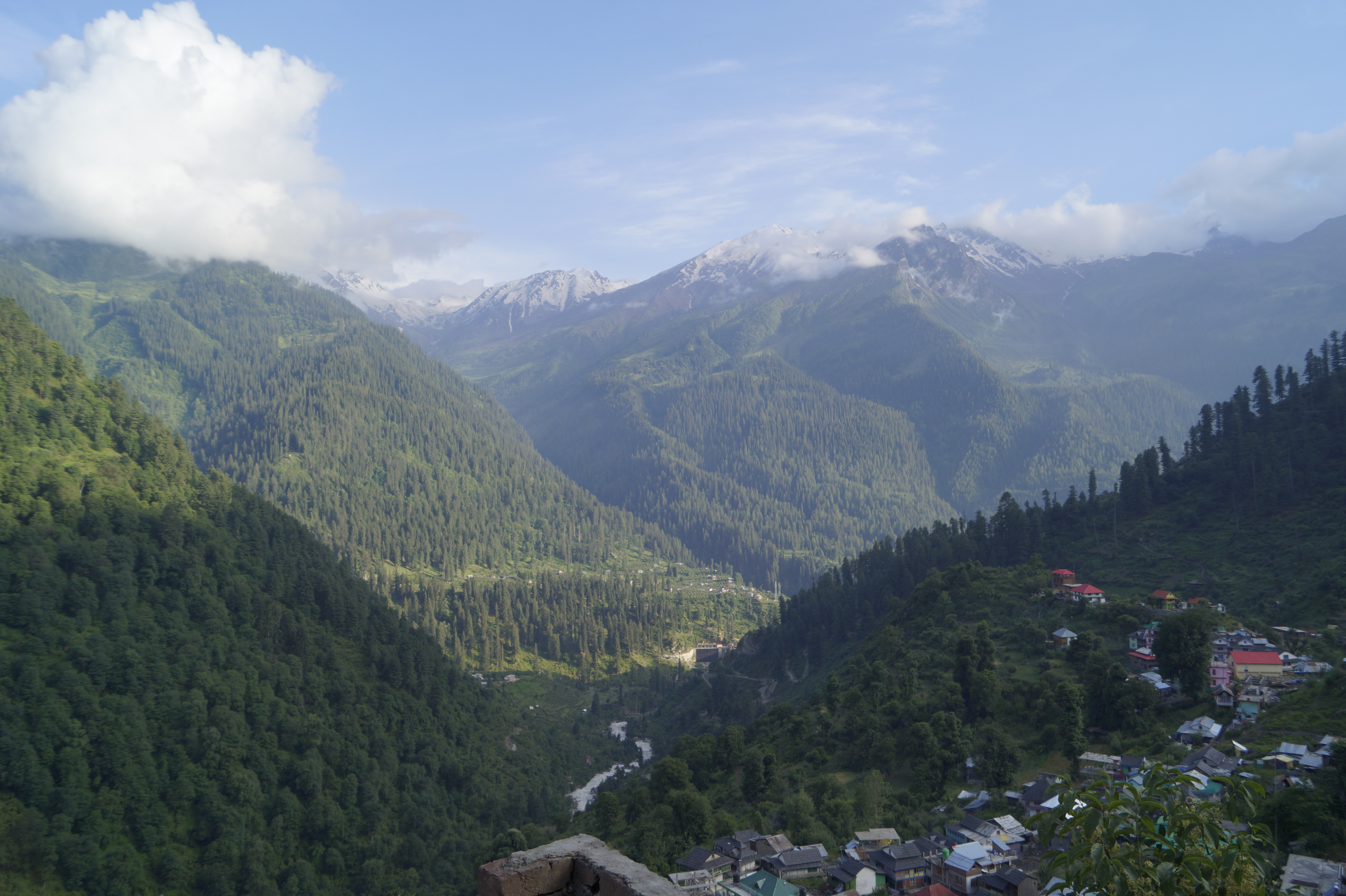
- Tosh in Monsoon season, Parvati Valley

Geology
- Type: River Valley

Geography
- Location: Himachal Pradesh in India
- Population centers: Kasol
- Coordinates: 31°59′32.47″N 77°28′54.36″E
- Rivers: Parvati River
- Interactive map of Parvati Valley

Parvati Valley is a valley in the Kullu district of Himachal Pradesh in northern India. It lies in the Himalayas, on the course of the Parvati River. The river rises near Mantalai Lake in the east and flows west to meet the Beas River at Bhuntar, about 10 km south of the town of Kullu. The valley's scenic routes are a popular destination for trekkers and tourists.

== Geography ==
The valley runs east to west, from its glaciated head on the Spiti watershed to the point where the Parvati river joins the Beas at Bhuntar, about 10 km south of Kullu. Elevations range from about 1,100 m at the valley mouth to more than 6,000 m at the surrounding peaks, including the Dibibokri Pyramid (6,400 m). At the head, the Parvati Glacier covers about 425 km^{2} (164 sq mi) and has lost mass and retreated over the last few decades.

A road runs up the lower valley from Bhuntar, passing the town of Kasol and the pilgrimage town of Manikaran and ending at Pulga, where the Parvati Hydel Project, a hydroelectricity dam, has been built. The valley above Pulga is reached on foot and is used mainly for trekking, with routes leading to the Pin Parvati Pass at its head. The Hot Springs at Manikaran and Kheerganga are visited by Hindu and Sikh pilgrims.

Several protected areas lie within or next to the valley. The Kanawar Wildlife Sanctuary, established in 1954, sits on slopes above the river between about 1,800 m and 5,000 m and borders the Great Himalayan National Park.

== Climate ==
The climate of the valley is governed largely by altitude, ranging from the temperate valley floor near Bhuntar and Kasol to the permanently snow-bound peaks above 6,000 m. Kasol, situated in the Parvati Valley, is classified as humid subtropical, and receives snowfall from late December to February.

The valley is part of the Kullu district and has a generally cool, dry climate with three broad seasons: a cold season from October to February, a hot season from March to June, and a rainy season from July to September.

Temperatures vary widely with elevation and season. Across the Kullu Valley, temperatures range from about 4 °C to 26 °C through the year. In summer, the temperature remains anywhere between 10 °C to 26 °C. It gets about 43% of its total rainfall during the southwest monsoon, 29% in summer, 23% in winter and about 5% after the monsoon. November is usually the driest month and July is the wettest.

Snowfall occurs mainly in December and January, and during this time, the upper parts of the valley are frequently cut off.

== History ==
=== Kingdom of Kullu and British rule ===
The valley was part of the kingdom of Kullu. The early seat of the kingdom was at Naggar, in the main Kullu Valley. Raja Jagat Singh, who ruled from 1637 to 1672, moved the capital from Naggar to Sultanpur, which is now the town of Kullu.

By about 1800, the authority of the Mughal Empire had weakened, and Kullu paid tribute to the Gurkhas, whose armies were pushing westward from Nepal, and to Sansar Chand, the Katoch ruler of Kangra. These payments let Kullu keep its own raja and avoid invasion. In 1809, Maharaja Ranjit Singh took the fort of Kangra and Kullu came under the Sikh Empire. Later the Sikhs took direct control of the state in 1839. After the First Anglo-Sikh War, the Treaty of Lahore on March 9, 1846 transferred Kullu, with Lahaul and Spiti, to the British. Kullu then became a subdivision of the Kangra district in the Punjab.

William Moorcroft, who travelled through Kullu in 1820, was one of the first Europeans to reach the area.

=== Manikaran ===
The town of Manikaran, on the Parvati River, is a place of pilgrimage. A temple there is traditionally attributed to Raja Jagat Singh. In Hindu tradition, the site is linked to Shiva and Parvati, and its name comes from a jewel (mani) that the goddess is said to have lost in the water. The temple was damaged in the Kangra earthquake of 1905. In Sikh tradition, Guru Nanak is said to have visited the town with his companion Bhai Mardana in the 16th century, and a gurdwara now stands at the spot. The hot springs here are used to cook food served at the gurdwara.

=== Malana ===
The village of Malana lies on a side valley above the Parvati. Its people speak Kanashi, a Sino-Tibetan language that differs from the Indo-Aryan speech of the surrounding villages and is now classified as endangered. In an 1871 report, the then assistant commissioner, A.F.P. Harcourt, recorded that the villagers of Malana kept apart from their neighbours, did not eat or marry outside the village, and spoke a language that outsiders could not understand.

A popular tradition holds that the people of Malana are descended from soldiers of Alexander the Great who stayed in the hills after 326 BCE. A genetic study published in 2010 found that the village forms a genetic isolate with Indo-Aryan affinities and gave no support to the idea of Greek descent.

Malana governs itself through a village council linked to its deity, Jamlu, who is identified with the sage Jamadagni. The council has an upper house and a lower house, and the village has been described as one of the oldest village republics in the world.

== Tourism ==
Tourism is central to the valley's economy. In 2024, Kullu was the most-visited district in Himachal Pradesh, with about 3.5 million tourist arrivals, of which 13,295 were foreign visitors.

Kasol has drawn foreign backpackers for decades, especially Israeli travellers who come after their compulsory military service. Kasol is nicknamed "Mini Israel" and its cafés serve Israeli food and print menus in Hebrew, and in a normal season the area receives an estimated 10,000 Israeli visitors, who also stay in nearby villages such as Tosh, Kalga, Pulga and Chalal. Since about 2010, domestic tourists have increasingly replaced long-staying foreign visitors, and room rents have increased.

The valley has a long-standing reputation for locally grown cannabis, and Kasol has become known for electronic music festivals and a party scene.

== Disappearances ==
A number of foreign tourists have gone missing in and around the valley since the early 1990s. In his 2022 book, Lost in the Valley of Death: Obsession and Danger in the Himalayas, journalist Harley Rustad’s records that dozens of backpackers have disappeared over the years, at a rate of about one a year.

Reported cases include Justin Shetler of the United States (2016), Bruno Muschalik of Poland (2015), Alexei Ivanov of Russia (2000), Maarten de Bruijn of Netherlands (1999), Ardavan Taherzadeh of Canada (1997), Ian Mogford of Britain, (1996), Odette Houghton of Australia (1992) and Marianne Heer of Switzerland (1992).

Some travellers were attacked. In July 2000, two German backpackers, Jorge Weihrauch and Adrian Mayer-Tasch, were shot while sleeping in their tents. Jorge was killed while Adrian survived with shotgun wounds to his leg. One month later, British civil engineer, Martin Young, his Spanish girlfriend, Maria Girones, and her son, Cristobal, were beaten while they slept in their tent with only Martin surviving.

Roughly a year later, a skeleton wrapped in its sleeping bag was identified as a missing Israeli military pilot, Nadav Mintzer, whose passport had been offered for sale in the markets of Manali. A local Sadhu was arrested for the murder of Alessandra Verdi, a 31-year-old Italian tourist who disappeared in 2000-2001.

In October 2, 2003, the body of Anna Bartlett was recovered from the Beas River, and an unidentified body was found 15 miles downstream.

A 1998 report in The Tribune said that 33 foreigners had died in the Kullu district between 1991 and 1998.

== Gallery ==
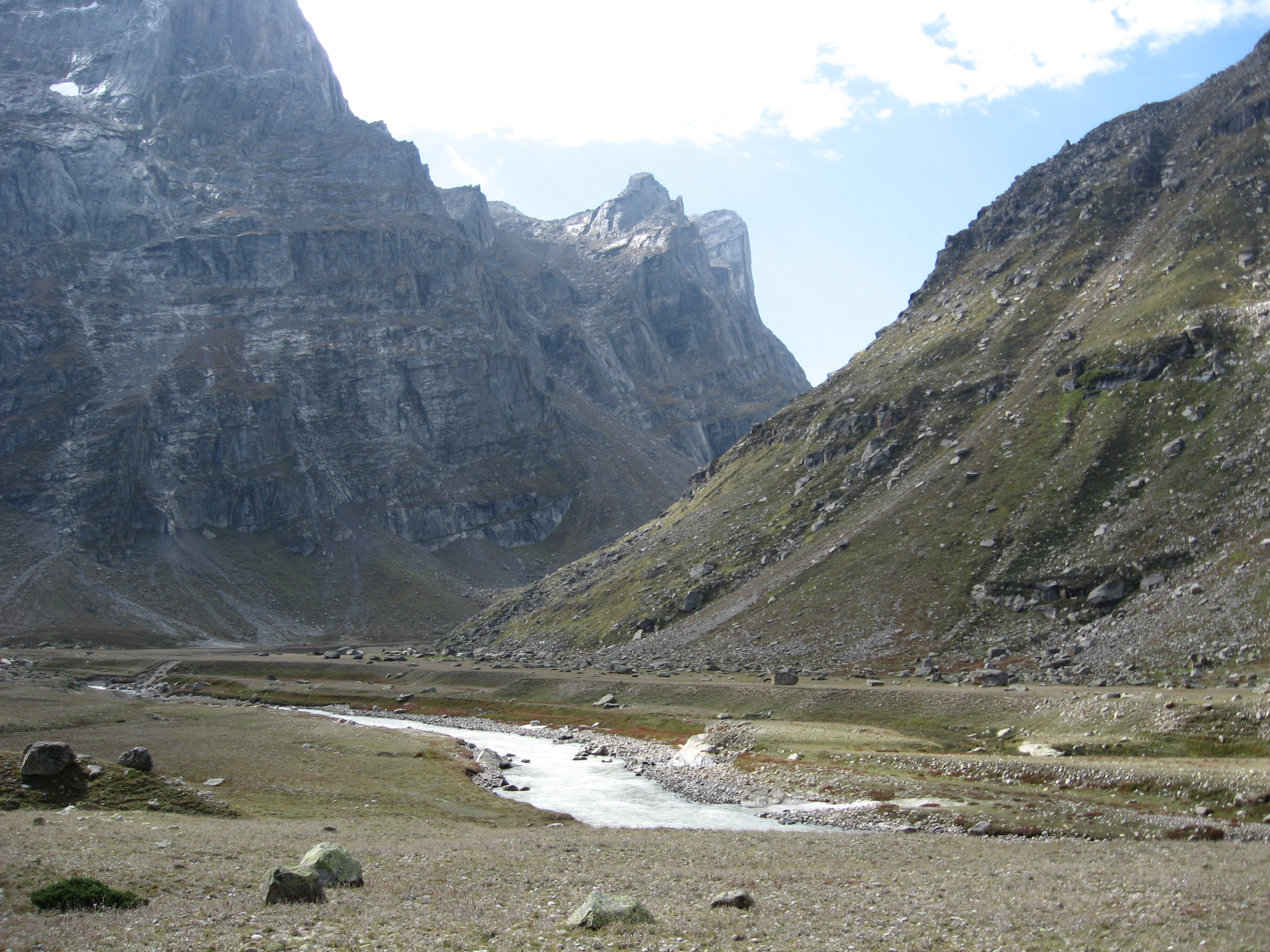
The upper Parvati Valley

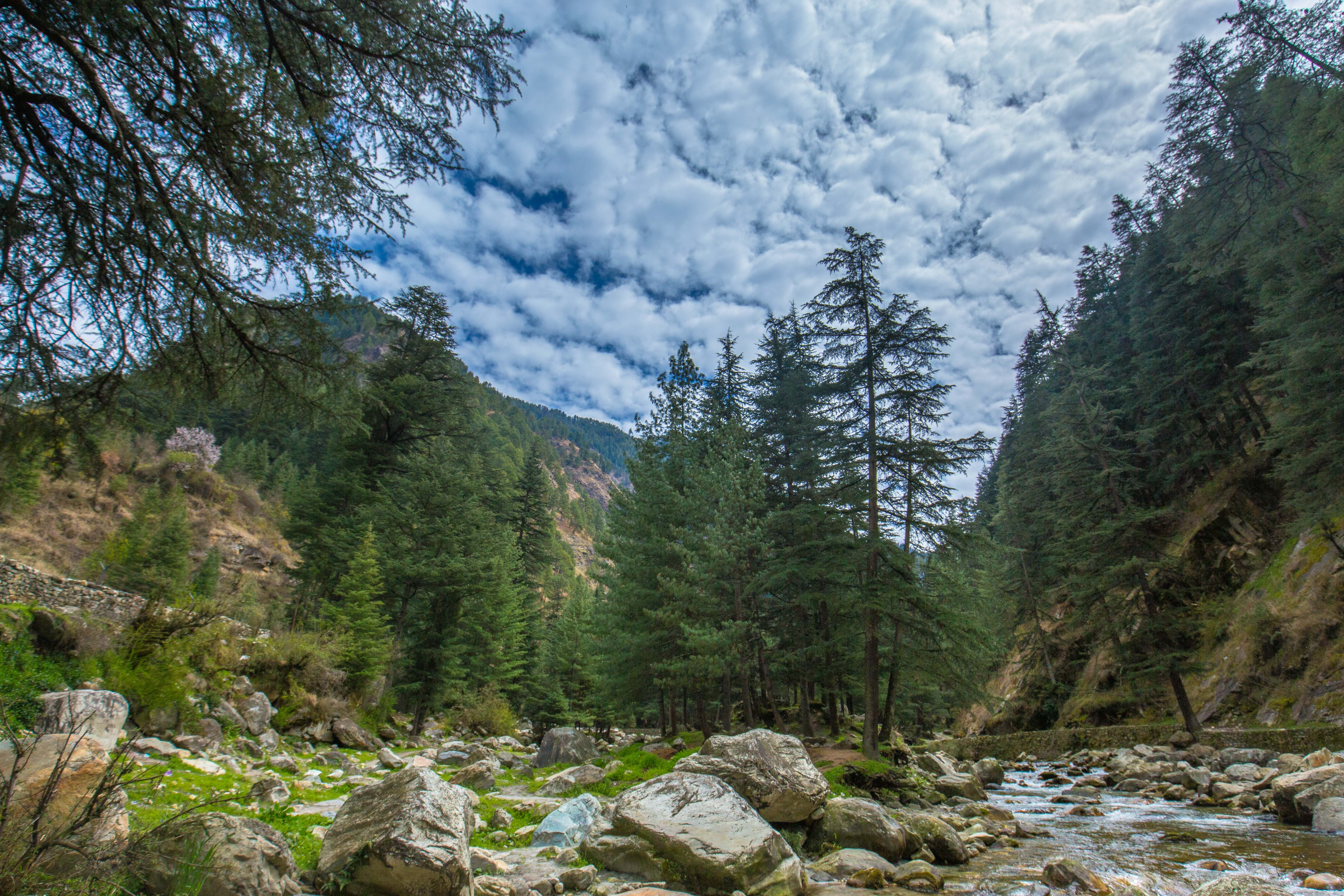
A view of Parvati River from the Kasol Town with the Mighty Himalayas in the vicinity

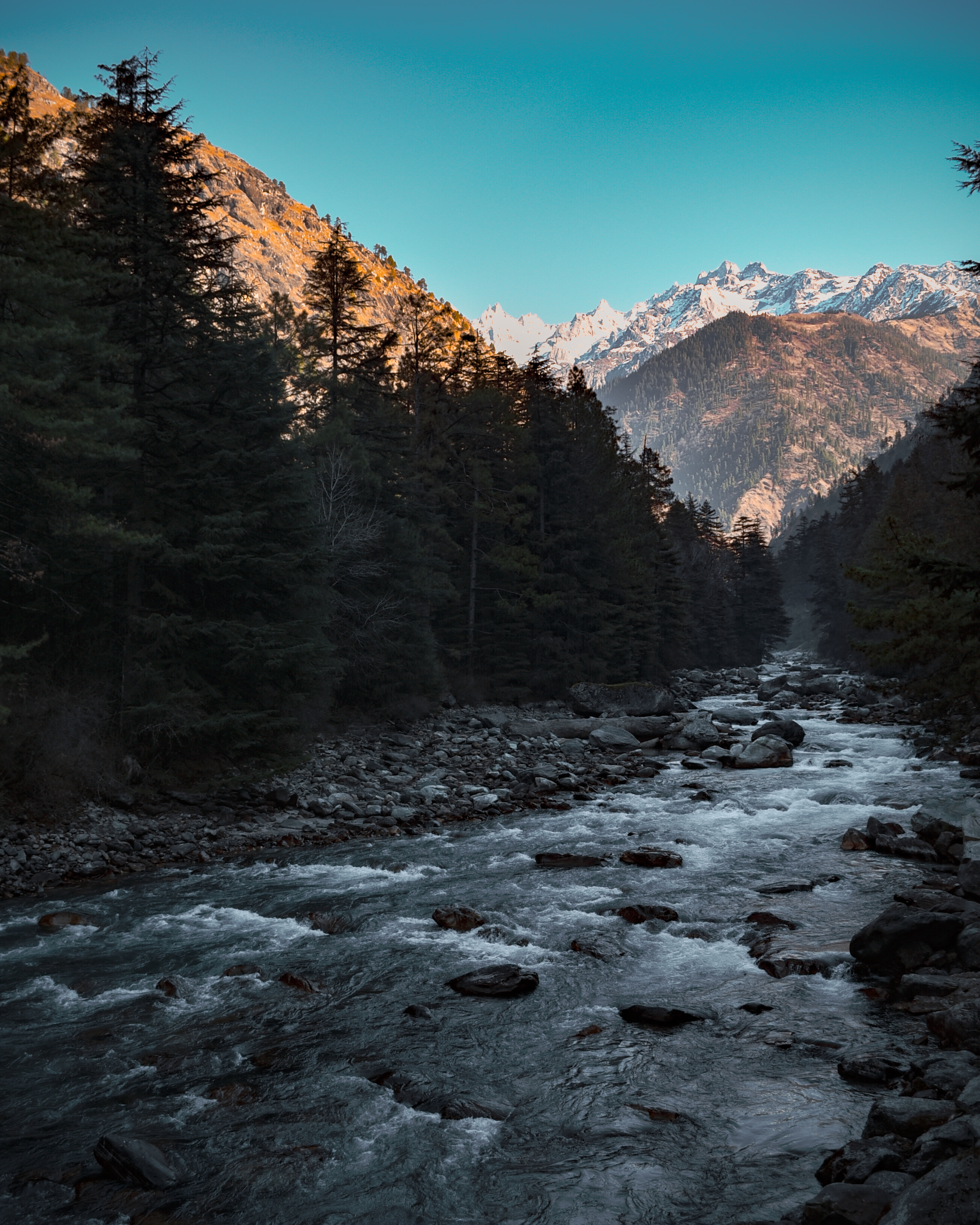
Parvati valley at Kasol

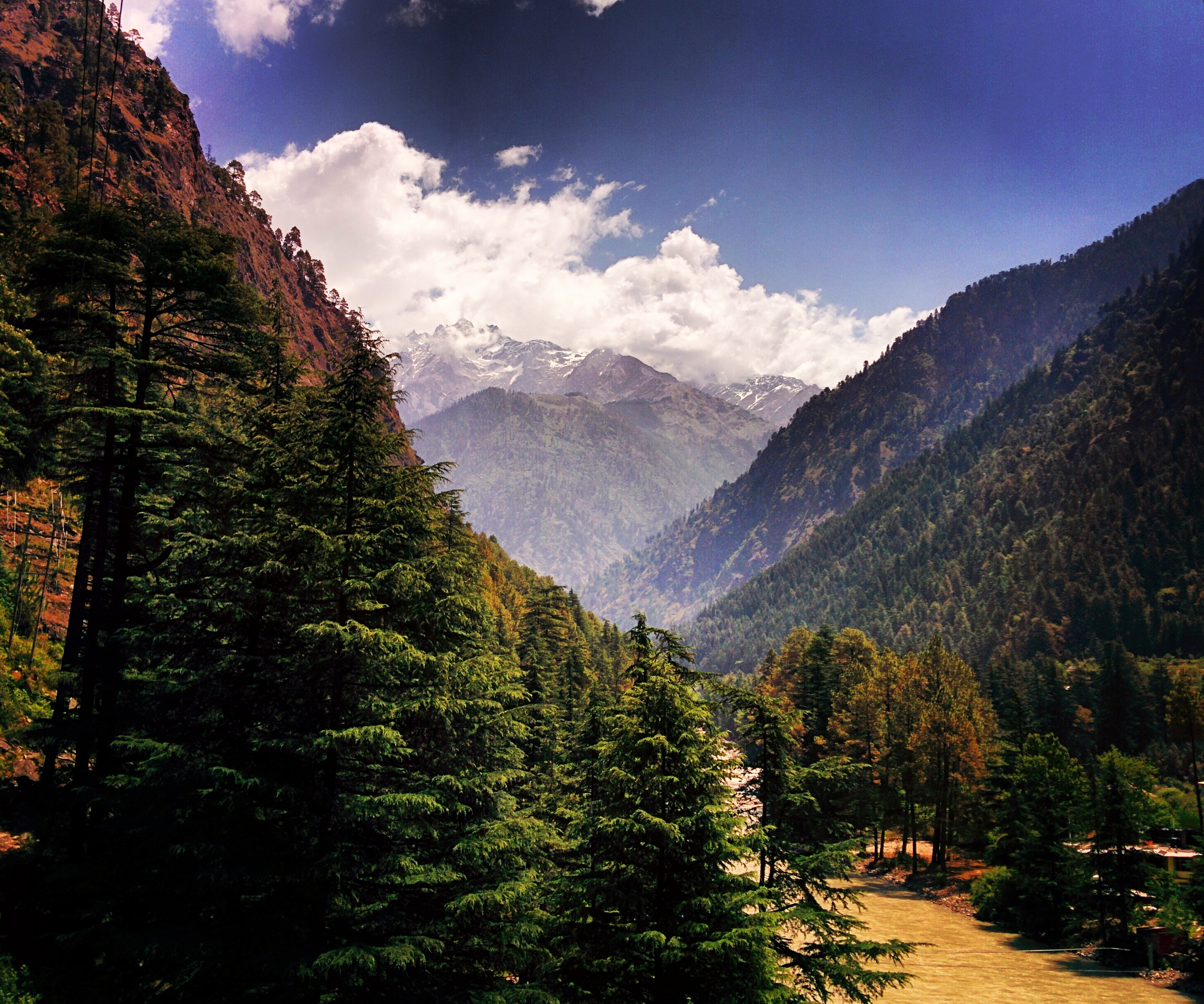
View of Parvati Valley

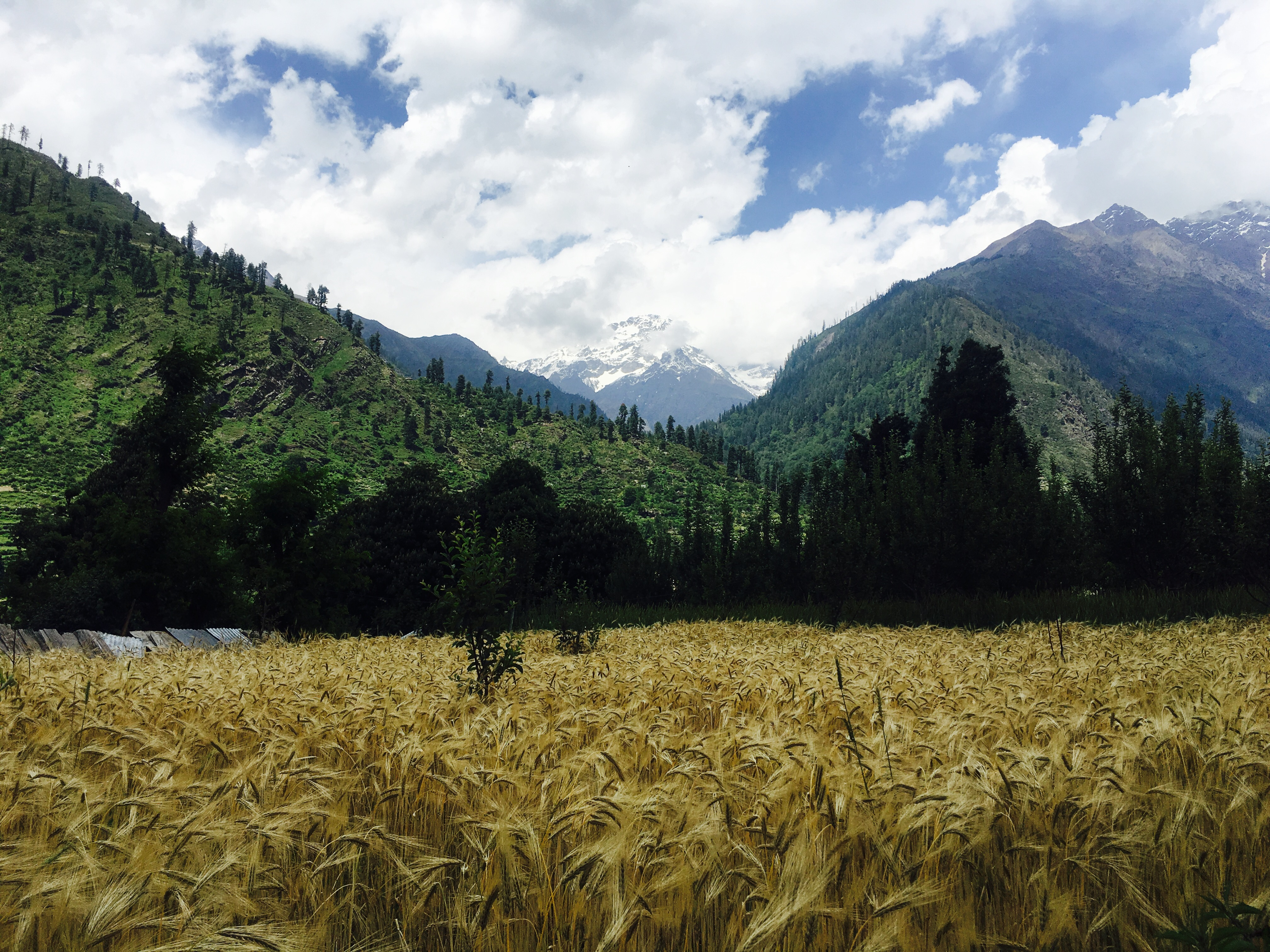
Wheat cultivation at Pulga village

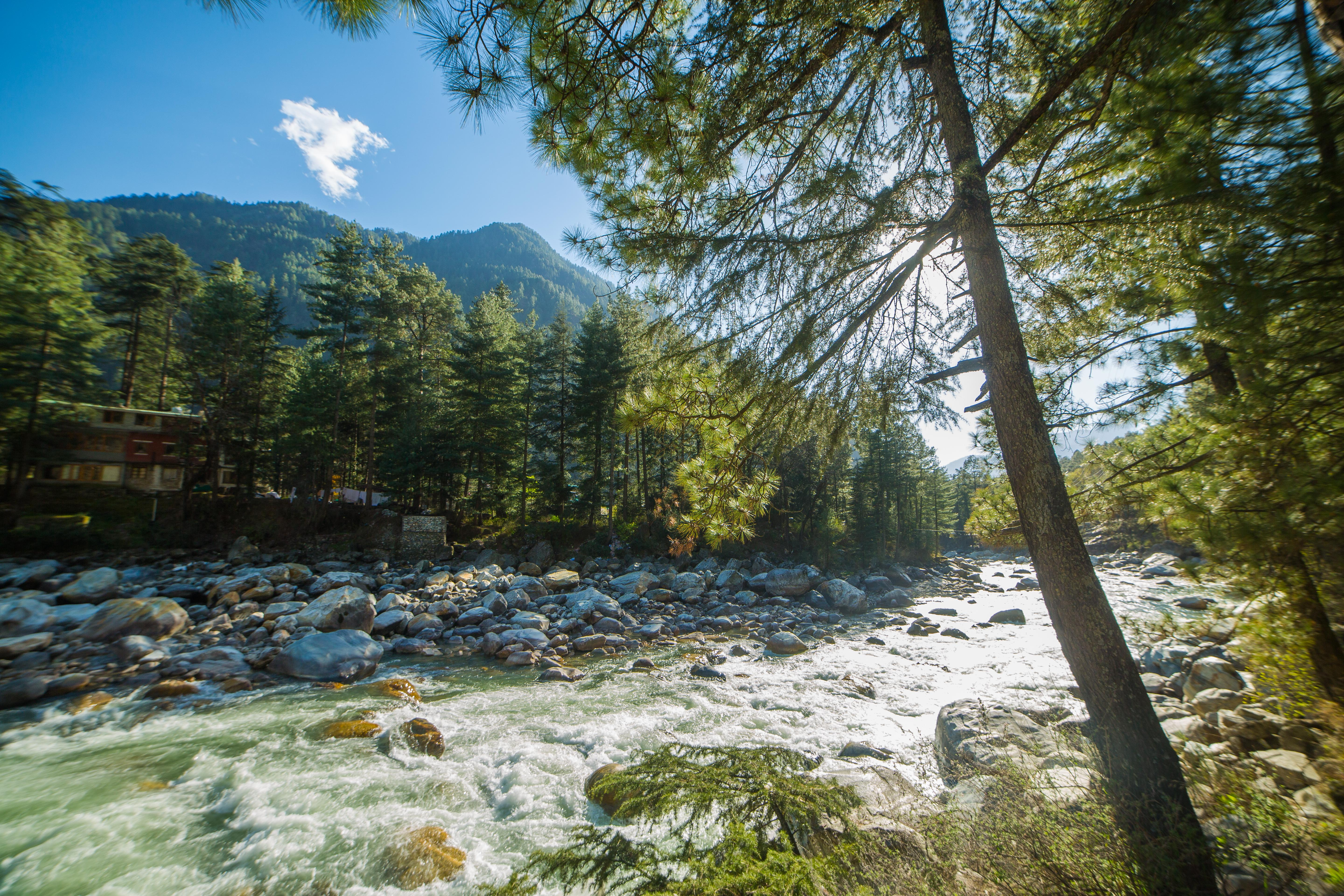
The waters can be freezing even during the early summer and only near a hot spring do the locals take baths

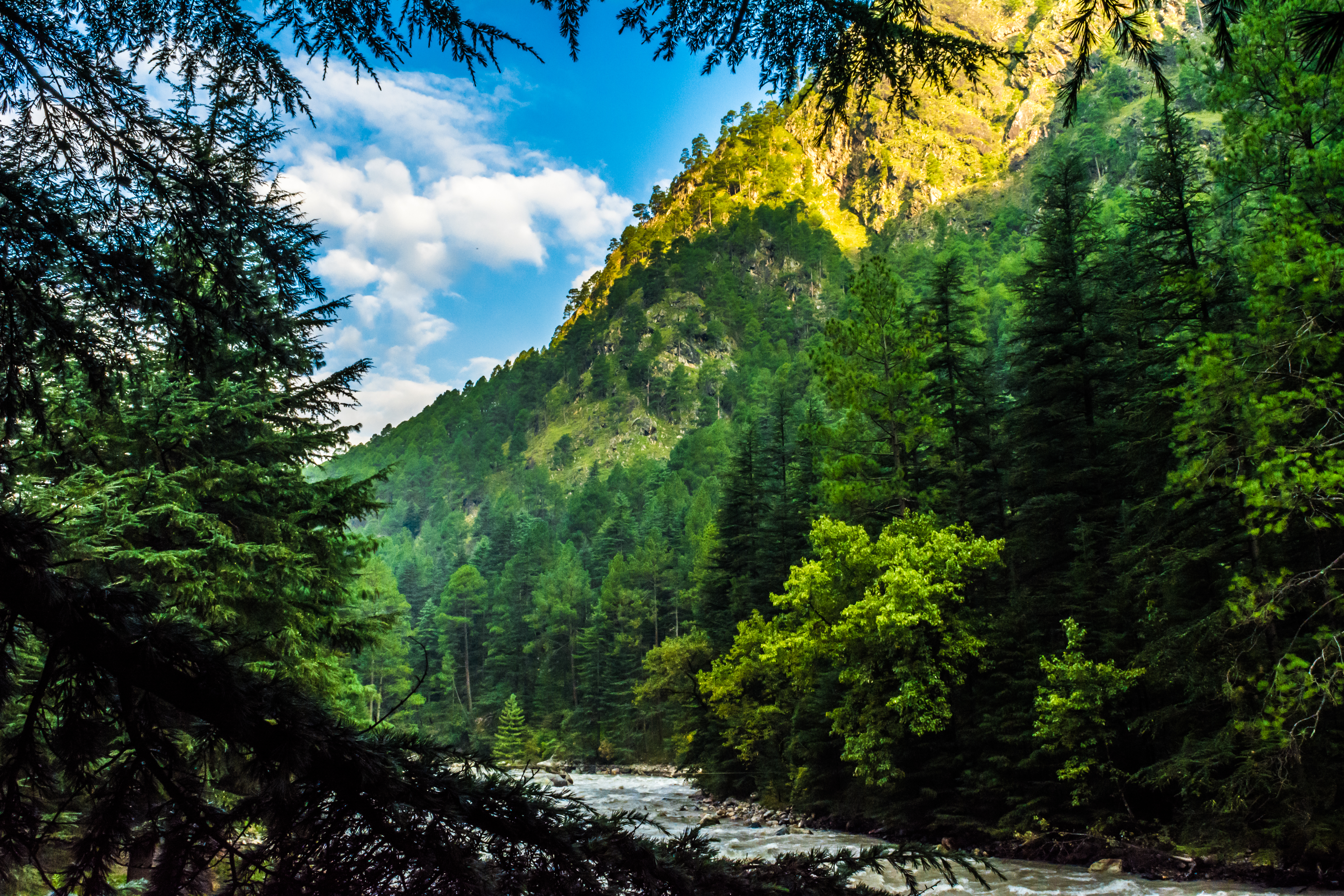
View of Parvati Valley

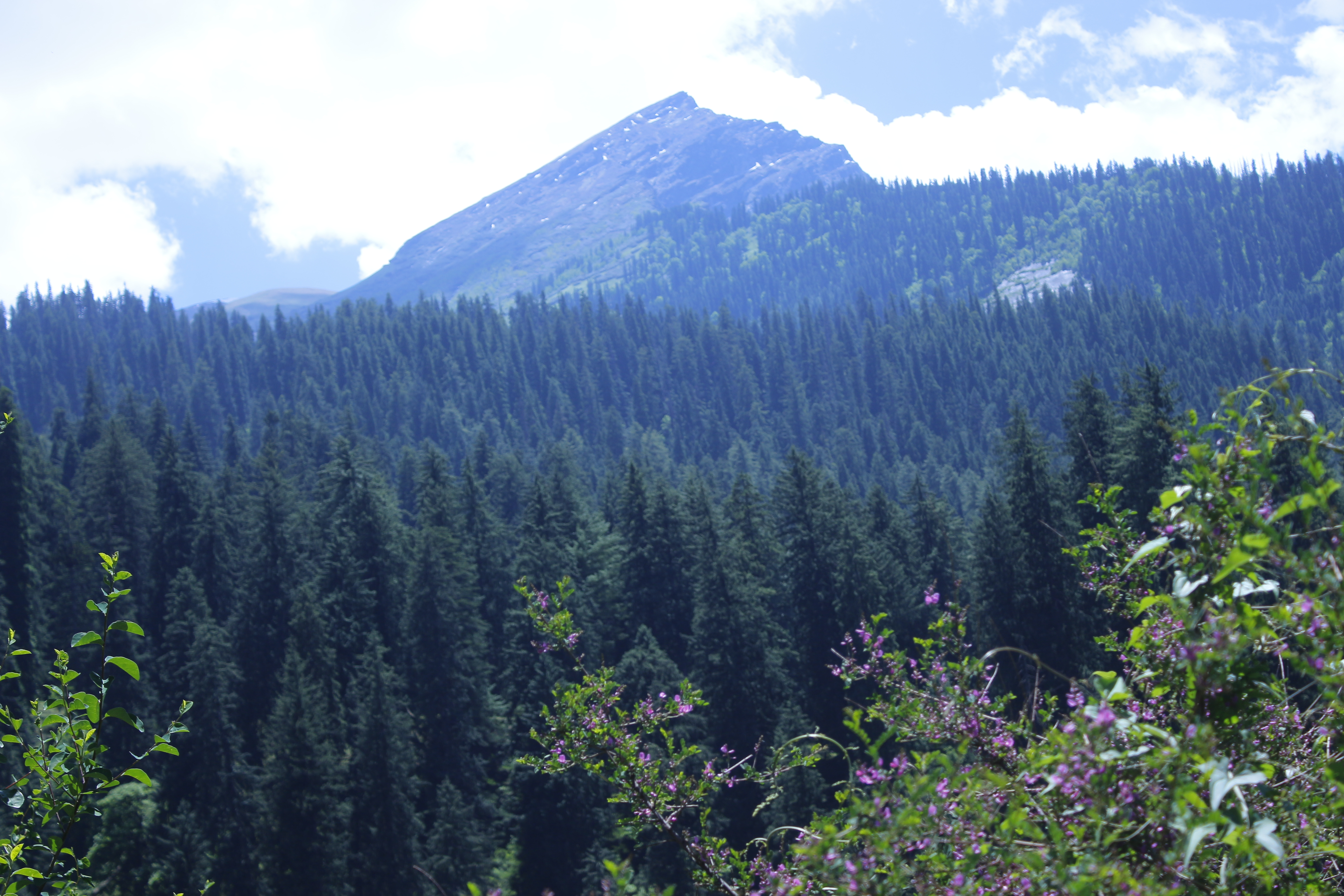
Forests of Kheer Ganga
