= Manikaran hot springs =

Thermal springs in Himachal Pradesh, India

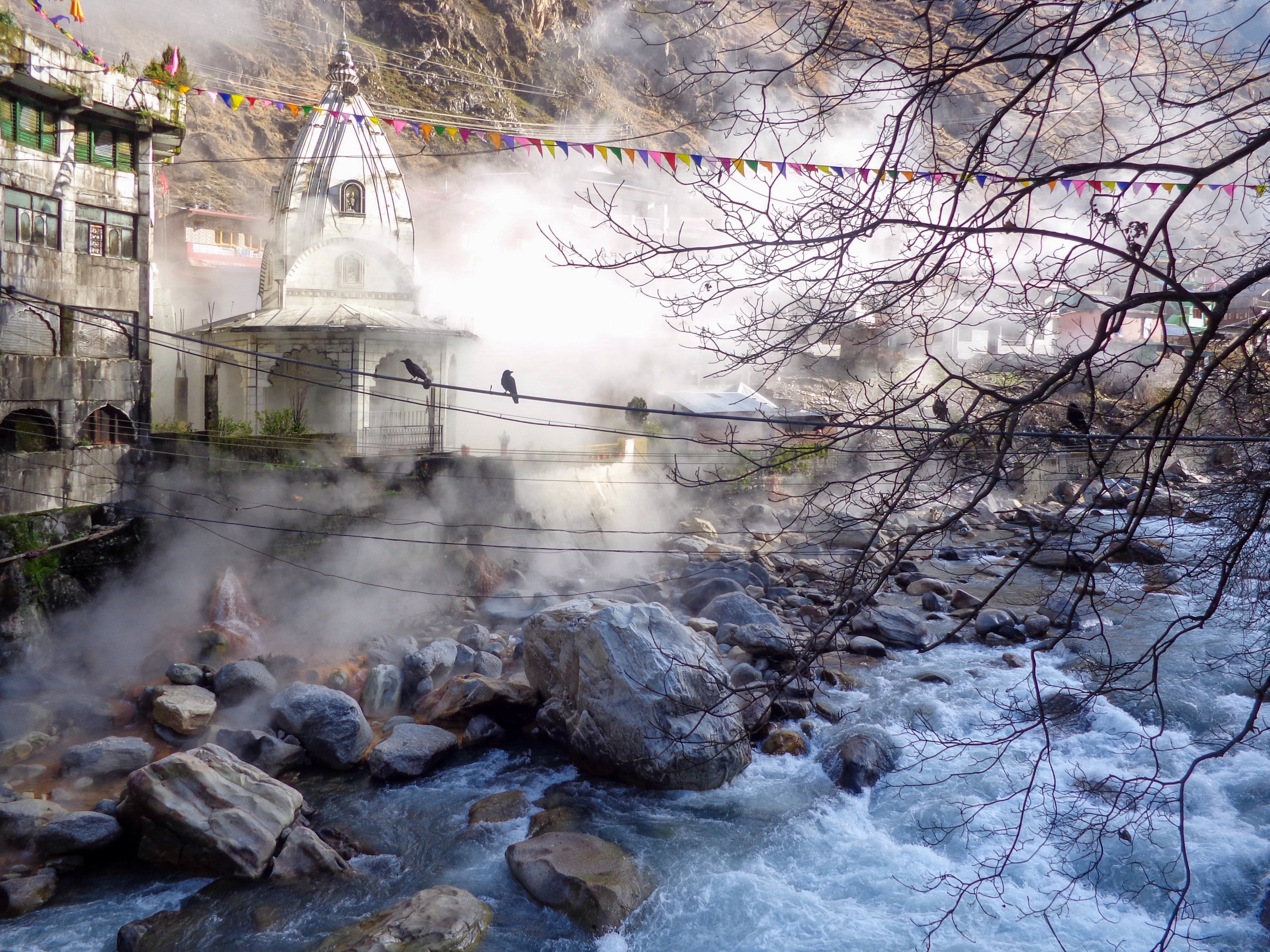
- Hot springs near the Manikaram temple and Manikaran Sahib gurudwara shrine on the banks of the Parvati River
- Interactive map of Manikaran hot springs
- Coordinates: 32°02′00″N 77°24′48″E
- Elevation: 1,760 meters (5,770 ft)
- Type: geothermal
- Discharge: 46 liters/min
- Temperature: 195 °C (383 °F)

Manikaran hot springs is a geothermal spring system located in the Kullu District of Himachal Pradesh, India, on the banks of the Parvati River. The town of Manikaran has been built up around these sacred springs, and an experimental geothermal energy facility is located there.

== Description ==
The hot spring water emerges from the springs at a high rate of discharge and at high temperatures; the thermal water from deep within the hot springs mixes with cold water at the surface.

== History and folklore ==
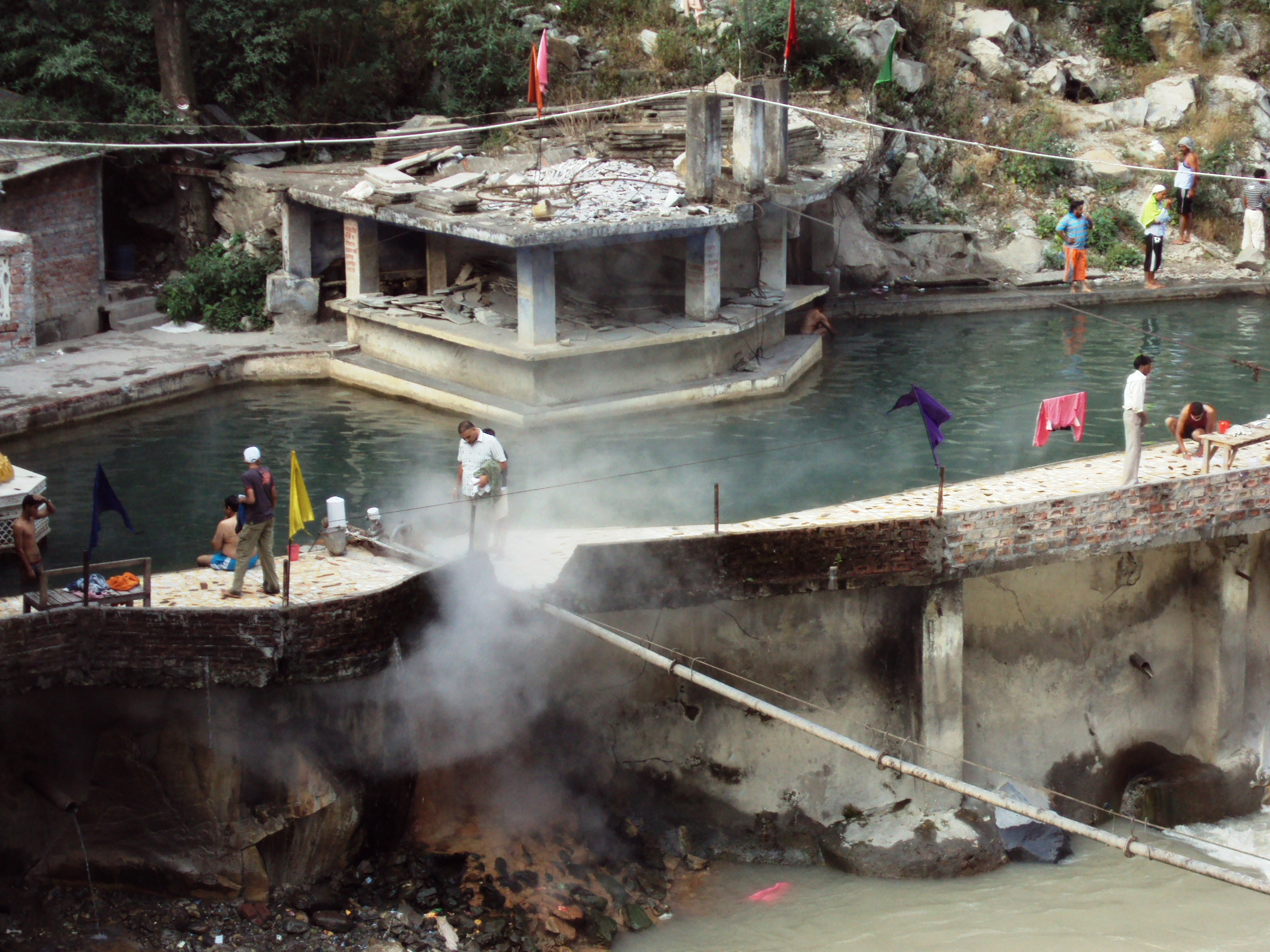
Hot springs at Manikaran

Geological phenomena such as thermal springs are often considered during ancient times in Indian civilization as evidence or manifestations of "divine power and gifts from the gods" (Rajendranath Seal, 1958). Chandrasekharam wrote that hot springs factor large in Hindu mythology, for example, hot springs are associated with the Mahabharata and Ramayana, especially in relation to Lord Shiva who is affiliated with sites of geothermal spring activity. A legend asserts that Parvati requested that Shiva assist her in finding a pair of earrings she lost. Using his third eye Shiva was able to see through the bubbling hot water to recover the earrings.

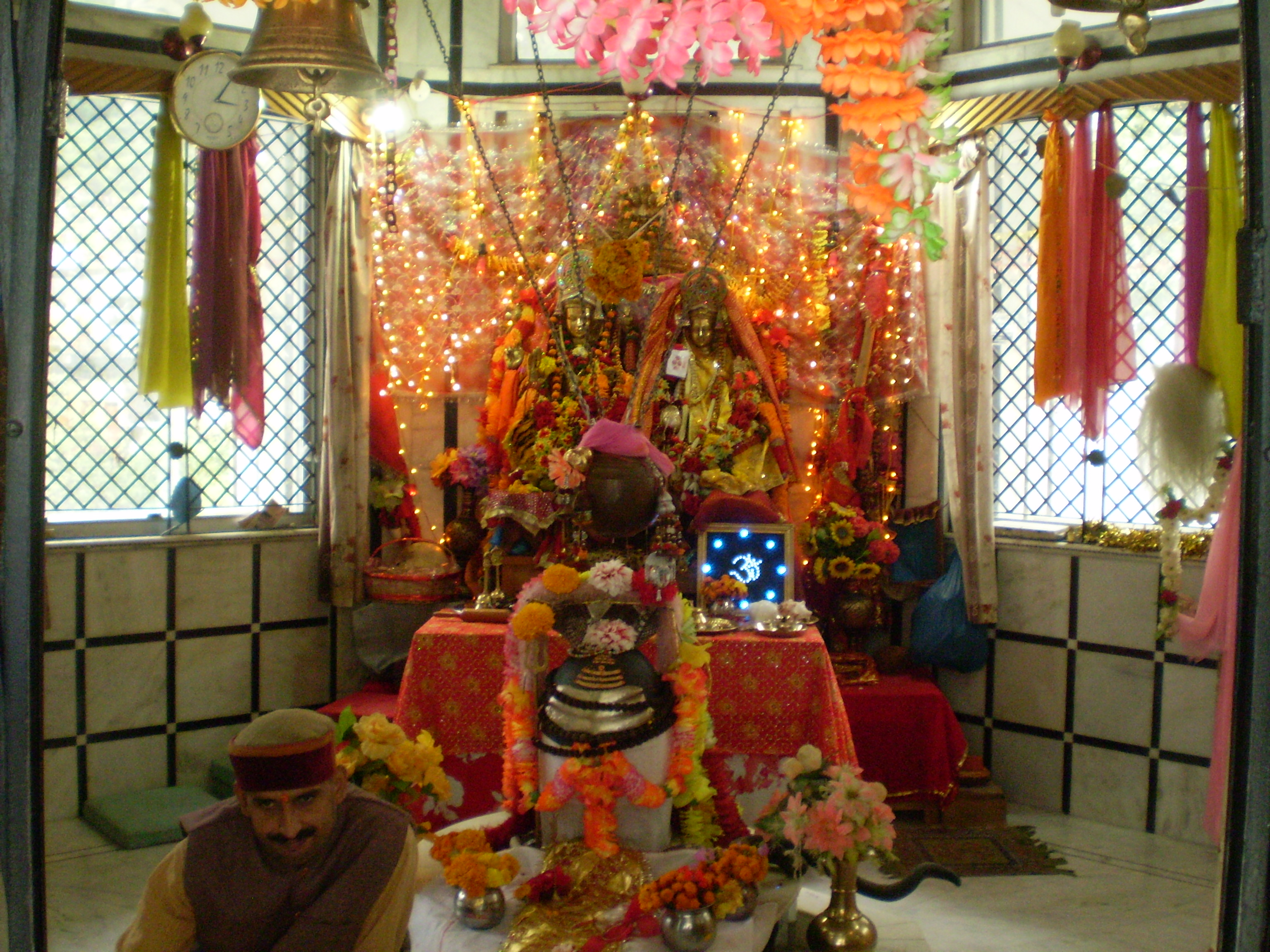
Shiva-Parvati temple at Manikaran hot springs

The Manikaram thermal springs are considered to be a pilgrimage destination to Sikhs and Hindus, and a Sikh gurudwara shrine and place of shared worship has been built near the source of the hot springs, as have Hindu temples. Nearby one finds devotees cooking rice wrapped in cloth packets in the hot spring waters.

The springs have been used for balneotheraputic purposes.

== Water profile ==
The hot spring water has a pH of 7.3 to 7.6 and is considered slightly alkaline. The spring water is carbonated, and CO2 gas percolates from the springs. The water contains sodium, calcium, chloride with small amounts of magnesium; analysis shows the spring water is of the Na-Ca-HCO3-Cl type. Trace metals have been detected in the water including cobalt, copper, strontium, nickel, silver, and zinc.

The water temperature has been measured at four of the non-boiling springs at a range of 186 °C (367 °F) to 202 °C (396 °F) degrees; the average temperature is 195 °C (383 °F) degrees.

Extremophile species of microorganisms are present in the hot spring water.
