= Park Township Airport =

- IATA: HLM; ICAO: KHLM

Summary
- Airport type: Closed
- Operator: Ottawa Aviation
- Location: Park Township, Michigan
- Elevation AMSL: 603 ft / 183.8 m
- Coordinates: 42°47′45″N 86°09′43″W
- Interactive map of Park Township Airport

Runways
Direction	Length		Surface
Direction	ft	m	Surface
5/23	2,999	914	Asphalt
12/30	2,245	684	Grass

Park Township Airport (IATA: HLM, ICAO: KHLM, FAA LID: HLM) was a public airport located in Park Township, 3 mi (5 km) northwest of Holland, Michigan, United States. Built in 1937, the airport was operated by Ottawa Aviation, an organization of local users whose aim was to promote the value of the airport to the surrounding community.

The airport had a main paved runway (5/23) that was demolished around August 15, 2020, and an intersecting grass runway (12/30) that still exists today. With the failure of a millage, the airport no longer supports fixed wing aircraft.

The airport was used for general aviation and had no regularly scheduled commercial flights. It was quite popular with ultralight and model aircraft. The airport was also home to the Experimental Aircraft Association Chapter 1242.

== Airport Property Redevelopment ==
In November 2022 the Park Township Board of Trustees approved a final plan for the redevelopment of the airport property. The plan included pathways, a parking lot, picnic shelters, native meadows and pickleball courts.
