= Jai Ram Thakur ministry =

- Ministry of Himachal Pradesh
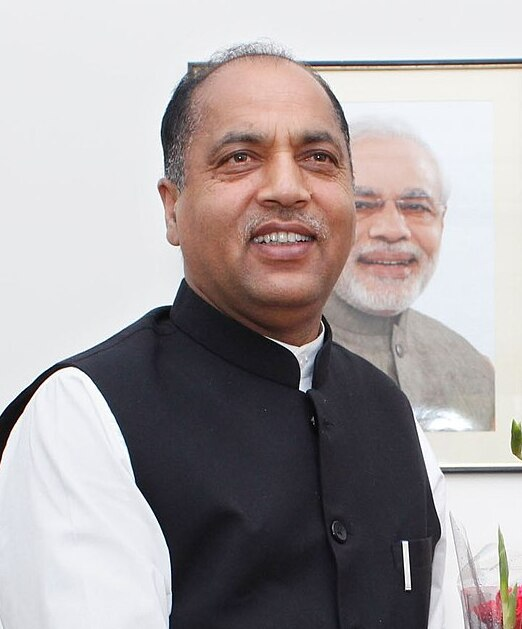
- Jai Ram Thakur; Chief Minister of Himachal Pradesh
- Date formed: 27 December 2017
- Date dissolved: 8 December 2022

People and organisations
- Head of state: Governor; Rajendra Arlekar
- Head of government: Jai Ram Thakur
- No. of ministers: 12
- Ministers removed: 3
- Member parties: BJP
- Status in legislature: Majority
- Opposition party: INC
- Opposition leader: Mukesh Agnihotri

History
- Election: 2017
- Legislature term: 5 years
- Predecessor: Fifth Virbhadra Singh ministry
- Successor: Sukvinder Singh Sukhu Ministry

Jai Ram Thakur, the leader of BJP was sworn in as the chief minister of Himachal Pradesh on 27 December 2017. Here is the list of ministers in his Cabinet. Six of the Council ministers are Rajputs.

== Council of Ministers ==
| Portfolio | Minister | Took office | Left office | Party |
|---|---|---|---|---|
| Chief Minister; General Administration; Personnel; Home; Finance; Public Works; Tourism; Planning; Excise & Taxation; Departments not allotted to any Minister | Jai Ram Thakur | 27 December 2017 | 8 December 2022 | BJP |
| Minister of Jal Shakti; Minister of Horticulture; Minister of Sainik Welfare | Mahender Singh | 27 December 2017 | 8 December 2022 | BJP |
| Minister of Food, Civil Supplies & Consumer Affairs | Kishan Kapoor | 27 December 2017 | 1 July 2019 | BJP |
| Minister of Food, Civil Supplies & Consumer Affairs | Rajinder Garg | 30 July 2020 | 8 December 2022 | BJP |
| Minister of Law & Legal Remembrancer; Minister of Parliamentary Affairs | Suresh Bhardwaj | 27 December 2017 | 8 December 2022 | BJP |
| Minister of Education | Suresh Bhardwaj | 27 December 2017 | 30 July 2020 | BJP |
| Minister of Education | Govind Singh Thakur | 30 July 2020 | 8 December 2022 | BJP |
| Minister of Power & Non Conventional Energy; Minister of Multi Purpose Projects | Anil Sharma | 27 December 2017 | April 2019 | BJP |
| Minister of Power & Non Conventional Energy; Minister of Multi Purpose Projects | Sukh Ram Chaudhary | 30 July 2020 | 8 December 2022 | BJP |
| Minister of Urban Development; Minister of Town & Country Planning; Minister of Housing | Sarveen Choudhary | 27 December 2017 | 30 July 2020 | BJP |
| Minister of Urban Development; Minister of Town & Country Planning; Minister of Housing | Suresh Bhardwaj | 30 July 2020 | 8 December 2022 | BJP |
| Minister of Tribal Development; Minister of Information Technology | Ram Lal Markanda | 27 December 2017 | 8 December 2022 | BJP |
| Minister of Agriculture | Ram Lal Markanda | 27 December 2017 | 30 July 2020 | BJP |
| Minister of Agriculture | Virender Kanwar | 30 July 2020 | 8 December 2022 | BJP |
| Minister of Health & Family Welfare | Vipin Singh Parmar | 27 December 2017 | 26 February 2020 | BJP |
| Minister of Health & Family Welfare | Rajiv Saizal | 30 July 2020 | 8 December 2022 | BJP |
| Minister of Rural Development & Panchayat Raj; Minister of Animal Husbandry & Fisheries | Virender Kanwar | 27 December 2017 | 8 December 2022 | BJP |
| Minister of Industry; Minister of Labour & Employment | Bikram Singh | 27 December 2017 | 8 December 2022 | BJP |
| Minister of Technical Education; Minister of Vocational & Industrial Training | Bikram Singh | 27 December 2017 | 30 July 2020 | BJP |
| Minister of Technical Education; Minister of Vocational & Industrial Training | Ram Lal Markanda | 30 July 2020 | 8 December 2022 | BJP |
| Minister of Human Resource; Minister of Youth Services & Sports | Jatin Puri | 27 December 2017 | 30 July 2020 | BJP |
| Minister of Human Resource; Minister of Youth Services & Sports | Rakesh Pathania | 30 July 2020 | 8 December 2022 | BJP |
| Minister of Transport | Govind Singh Thakur | 27 December 2017 | 30 July 2020 | BJP |
| Minister of Transport | Bikram Singh | 30 July 2020 | 8 December 2022 | BJP |
| Minister of Social Justice & Empowerment | Rajiv Saizal | 27 December 2017 | 30 July 2020 | BJP |
| Minister of Social Justice & Empowerment | Sarveen Choudhary | 30 July 2020 | 8 December 2022 | BJP |
| Minister of Cooperation | Rajiv Saizal | 27 December 2017 | 30 July 2020 | BJP |
| Minister of Cooperation | Suresh Bhardwaj | 30 July 2020 | 8 December 2022 | BJP |
| Minister of Revenue | Mahender Singh | 30 July 2020 | 8 December 2022 | BJP |
| Minister of Language Art & Culture | Govind Singh Thakur | 30 July 2020 | 8 December 2022 | BJP |

== Former Ministers ==
| S.No. | Name | Department | Tenure | Party | Reason |
|---|---|---|---|---|---|
| 01 | Anil Sharma | Department of Power & Non Conventional Energy, MPP | | BJP | Resigned |
| 02 | Kishan Kapoor | Department of Food, Civil Supplies & Consumer Affairs | | BJP | Elected to the 17th Lok Sabha |
| 03 | Vipin Singh Parmar | Department of Health and Family Welfare | | BJP | Elected as the Speaker of the Himachal Pradesh Legislative Assembly |
