= Vijai Singh Mankotia =

Indian politician (1939–2026)

Vijai Singh Mankotia (1939 – 29 September 2026) was an Indian politician who was a member of the Indian National Congress. Mankotia was the member of the Himachal Pradesh Legislative Assembly from the Shahpur constituency in Kangra district on Janata Dal and Indian National Congress ticket. He was the arch-rival of Chief Minister of Himachal Pradesh Virbhadra Singh. Mankotia died on 29 September 2026, at the age of 87.
