= Kalga, Himachal Pradesh =

Village in Himachal Pradesh, India

Coordinates: 31.9967936°N 77.4516711°E

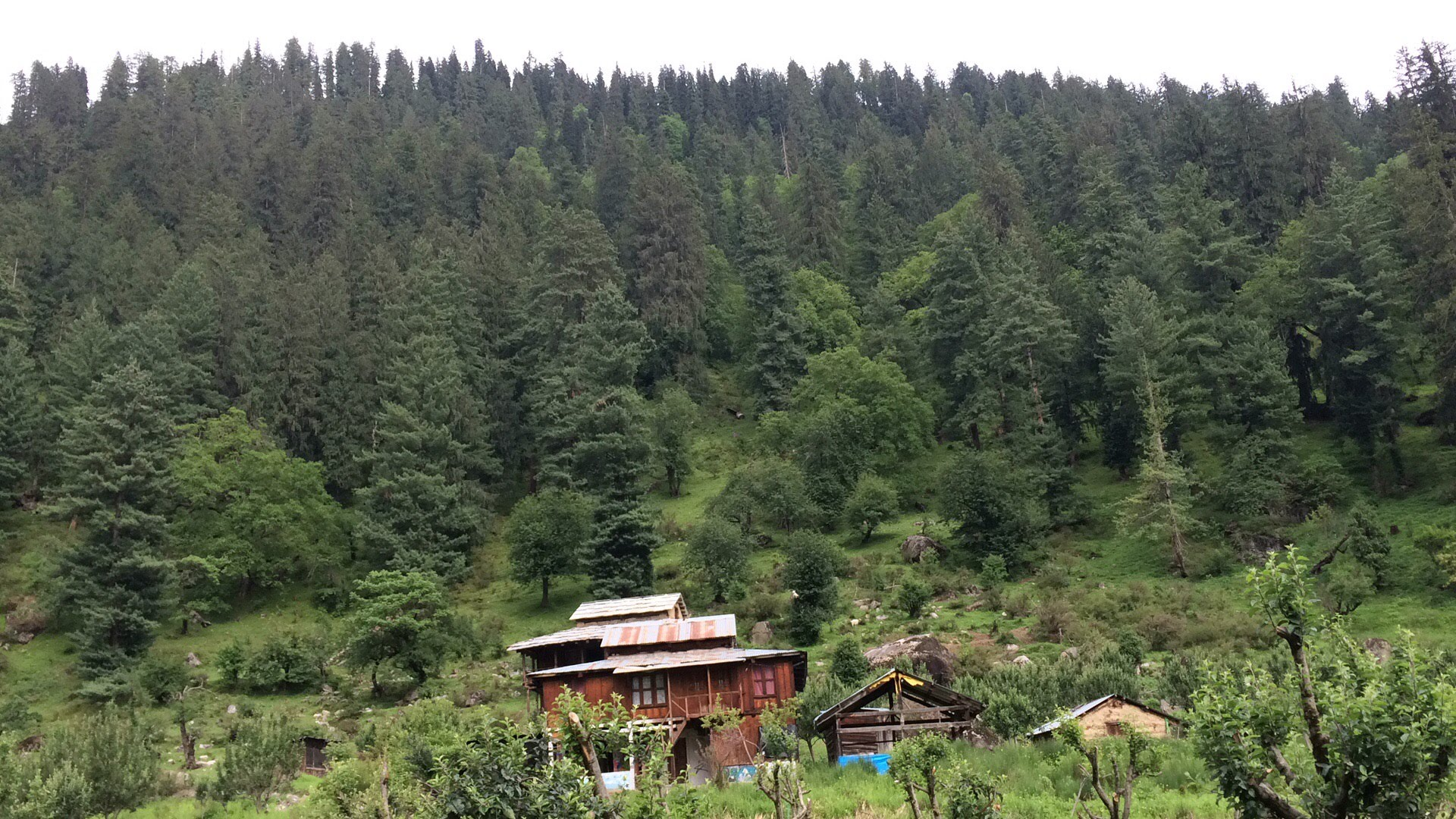
Kalga village, HP

Kalga (also called "Kalgha") is a village in Kullu district in the state of Himachal Pradesh, India. It is located at an elevation of about 2,280 m (7,480 ft) in the Parvati Valley, surrounded by mountains. The nearest bus stand is at Barshaini. The village attracts crowds during the months of April to July and is a short detour en route on the trek route to Kheerganga.
