= Khimi Ram =

Indian politician

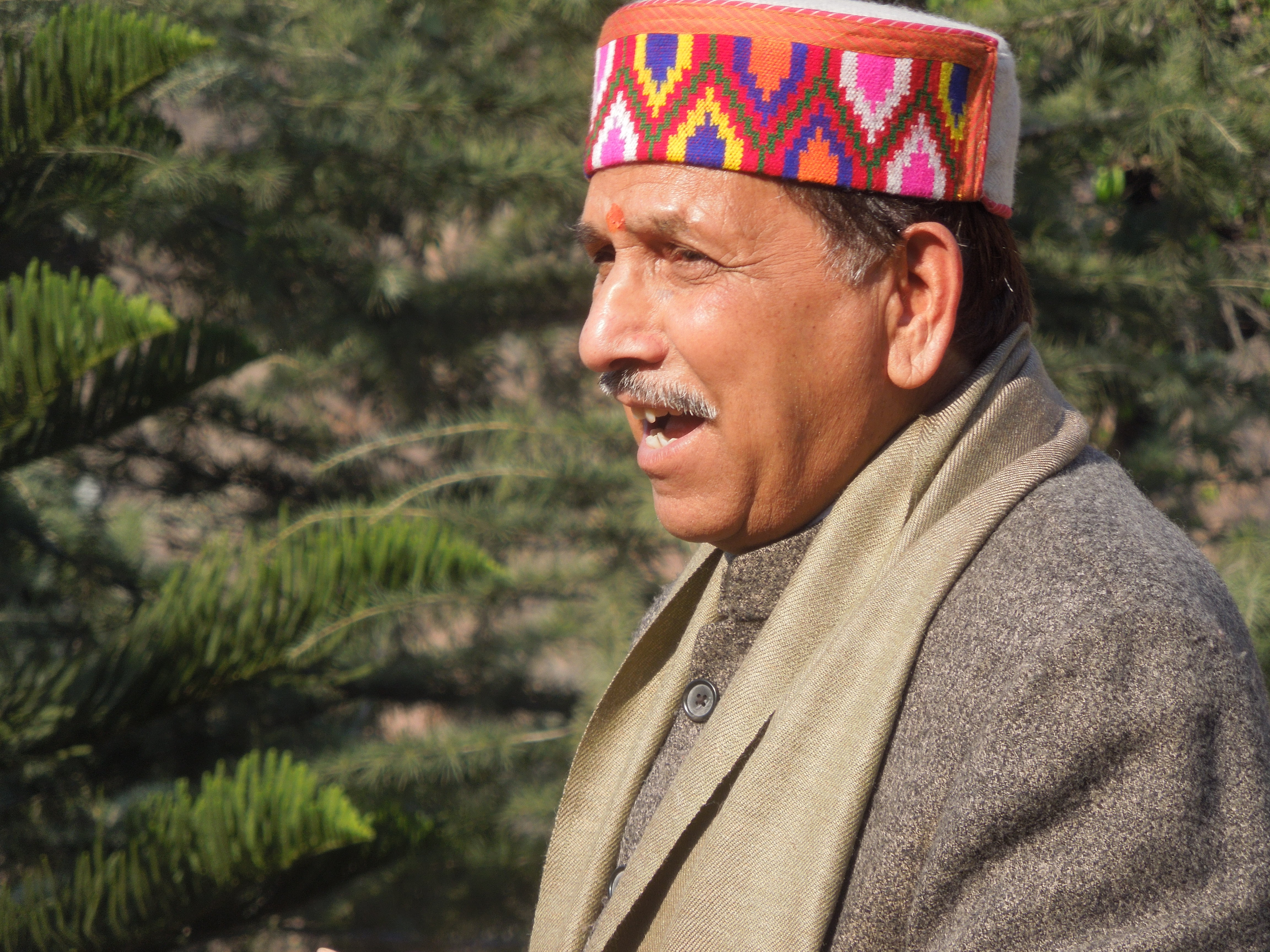
- Khimi Ram addressing his supporters in Banjar

President of Bharatiya Janata Party, Himachal Pradesh
- In office 20 February 2012 – 18 January 2020
- National President: Nitin Gadkari
- Preceded by: Jai Ram Thakur
- Succeeded by: Satpal Singh Satti

Personal details
- Born: Khimi Ram Fagu, Kullu district, Himachal Pradesh
- Spouse: Late Smt. Leela Devi
- Children: 3
- Education: B.A., B.Ed.
- Website: http://www.khimiram.com

Khimi Ram Sharma is an Indian politician from the federating unit of Himachal Pradesh of the state of India. He started his career as a Government school teacher serving in different subdivisions in Kullu district of Himachal Pradesh. Prior to his career as a teacher, he had also worked as a labourer in the Public Works Department in Kullu district. He has been elected onto dignified posts since he first contested his election as Zila Parishad chairman in Kullu district. He served as MLA from Banjar assembly constituency of Kullu district twice since 2003 to 2012. He has also served as deputy speaker of Vidhan Sabha of Himachal Pradesh in 2007 and later he was elected as BJP chief of Himachal Pradesh. In 2011 he was in state cabinet as forest minister.

== Early life and education ==
Khimi Ram Sharma comes from a humble farming family in village Fagu in Parvati valley of Kullu district. In his early childhood he was a sheep and cow herder and used to study in Government primary school chheor until fifth standard. For matriculation he went to Government High School Bhunter. To pursue BA he went to Government degree college, Kullu where he studied Political Science, Economics, English and Sanskrit. He also ranked first in the college during that year and got awarded by the then Education Minister of Himachal Pradesh. In college years he tested waters in politics by becoming president of 'Students' Welfare Association'. Later on he did his B.Ed. from Government college of Education, Dharamshala.

After completion of Education he got position of 'TGT' and taught in various government schools in Kullu district from 1973 till 1993. His first school where he taught as TGT was Government Middle school, Shangarh in Banjar valley and his last school as a teacher was GSSS Bhunter.

== Family ==
Khimi Ram Sharma was married to Late. Smt Leela Devi and they have four children Sanjeev Kumar, Anju Sharma, Sheetal Sharma and Nayan Sharma and two daughters in law. He also has 3 grandsons.

== Politics ==
Khimi Ram Sharma is a leader who emerged during the Atal Bihari Vajpayee era. Khimi, with other leaders such as Dhumal were ones who first played a huge role in making First Majority BJP Government in Himachal Pradesh. Khimi Ram Sharma's entry in politics was in 1999 and in 2000 he contested his first election for Zila parishad member and won and later in 2000 he was elected to the position of Chairman of Zila Parishad, Kullu. In 2003 he got ticket to contest election from Banjar assembly constituency from BJP and he won the election and in 2007 he again won the election from Banjar and in 2007 he was elected unanimously as Deputy Speaker of Vidhan Sabha. In 2009, he was elected as BJP chief of Himachal Pradesh. In 2011, he became member of state cabinet and served as Forest Minister of Himachal Pradesh. He is also a confidant of Dr. Prem Kumar Dhumal.

In 2012 election he lost to Late Sh. Karan Singh and in 2017 due to party politics and change in leadership in BJP at national level and at state level Khimi Ram and later many big leaders were sidelined by BJP and in recent elections even Dr. Prem Kumar Dhumal was used as party face but later he was also sidelined but these leaders respectfully accepted decisions of the party.

On 1 September 2021, Khimi Ram Sharma made a big announcement by organising a meeting where he said that his supporters want him to contest from Banjar for the upcoming Assembly elections.

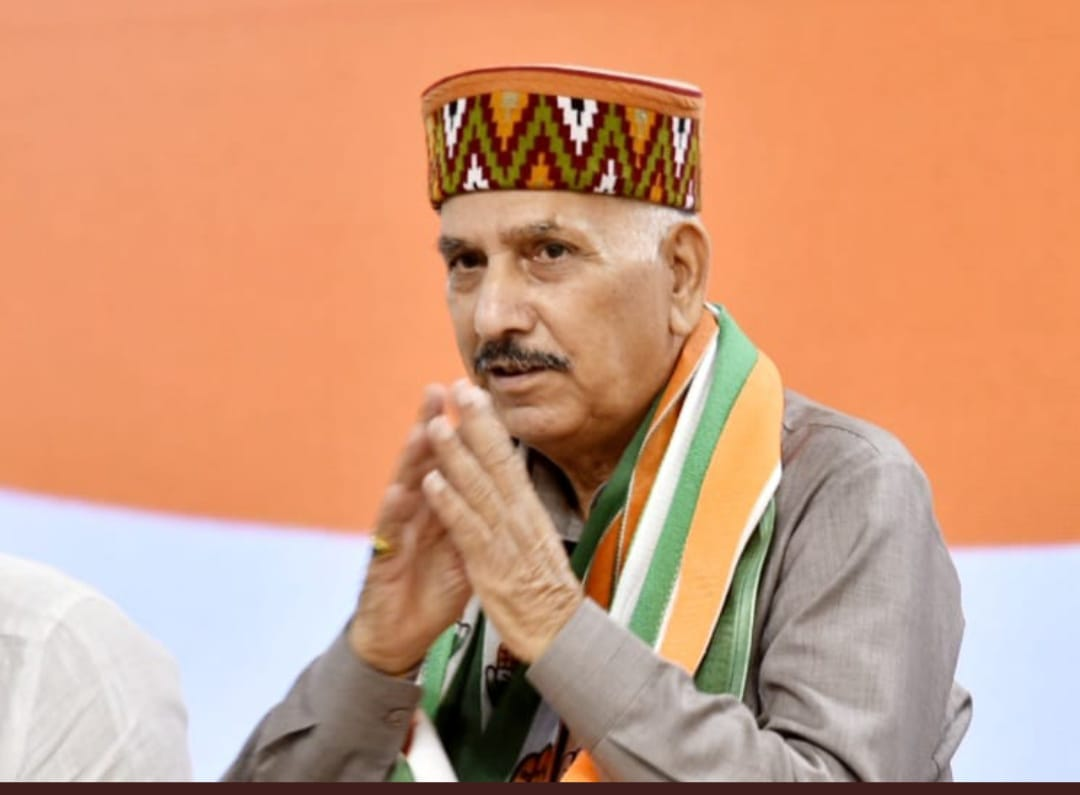
Khimi Ram Sharma officially joined INC at AICC HQ's Delhi.

On 12 July 2022, Khimi Ram Sharma joined the Indian National Congress.
