= Loktantrik Morcha Himachal Pradesh =

Loktantrik Morcha Himachal Pradesh (abbr LMHP) Democratic Front Himachal Pradesh was a political party in the Indian state of Himachal Pradesh. LM(HP) was registered as a political party in 2003. It is led by Mohinder Singh, former Himachal Vikas Congress minister and convenor of Him Loktantrik Morcha.

Singh had been Public Works Department Minister in the HVC-Bharatiya Janata Party (BJP) cabinet in the state. But shortly after the 1998 elections, a group of BJP legislators demanded his resignation on ground of corruption. HVC leader Sukh Ram had to bow to their demand, and Singh was expelled from HVC. Initially Singh joined Lok Janshakti Party. Ahead of the 2003 assembly elections he launched LMHP as a political party and was elected as its sole member of the assembly. In total LMHP had 14 candidates, who together got 66,102 votes (2,17% of the votes in the state).

In the 2004 elections LM(HP) supported the BJP-led National Democratic Alliance. Ahead of the elections there were discussions on a merger with BJP, He merged his party with the BJP in 2004.In the 2007 election he fought the election under the ticket of bjp and again retained his seat.
