= Victory Tunnel =

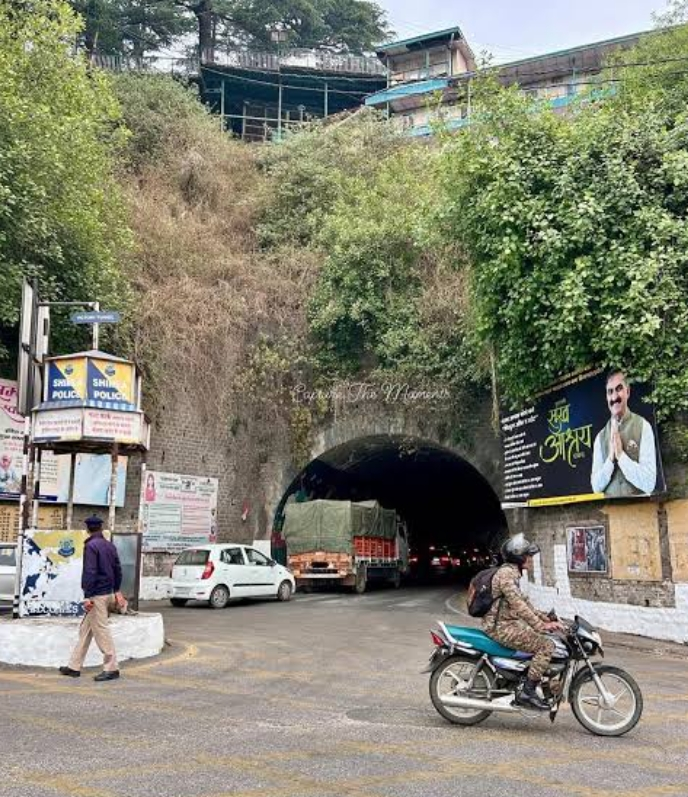
- Victory Tunnel Shimla
- Interactive map of Victory Tunnel

Overview
- Location: Shimla, Himachal Pradesh, India
- Coordinates: 31.105349°N 77.163985°E
- Status: Active
- Route: Circular Road
- Crosses: Bantony Hill

Operation
- Opened: 08 May 1945
- Operator: Government of Himachal Pradesh
- Traffic: Automative

Technical
- Length: 100 m
- No. of lanes: Two (one in each direction)

Victory Tunnel (Hindi: विक्टरी सुरंग) is a tunnel in Shimla in the North Indian state of Himachal Pradesh, India. It is a road tunnel on Circular Road which connects two important parts of the city. It bypasses Sanjauli and Chotta Shimla for short and proper connectivity in the city.

== Etymology ==
Victory Tunnel was built by the British in 1945. It was immediately opened after the Allied victory in World War II on 08 May 1945, hence its name.

== History ==
Victory Tunnel was built in 1945 during the British colonial period in India. It was constructed as part of the road network in Shimla, which was then the summer capital of British India.

== Importance ==
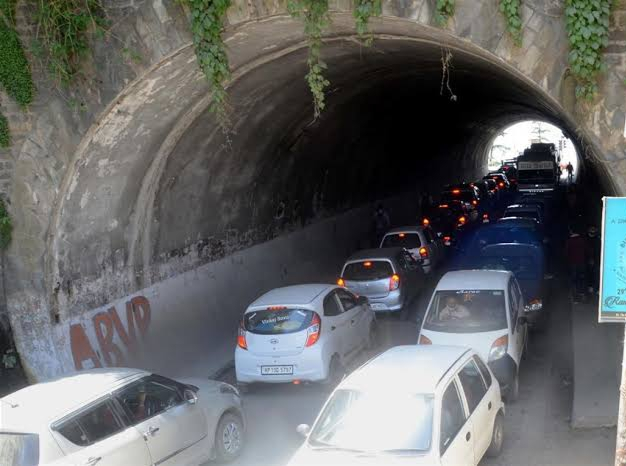
Traffic in Victory Tunnel

The Tunnel is an important junction. It is located on the key circular road connecting Shimla’s railway station and Old Bus Stand with the city's other important parts such as Kufri, IGMC, Kaithu, Annadale and other parts of the city bypassing south eastern Shimla (Chotta Shimla). The short route to Sanjauli is also from the tunnel. It also connects upper parts of Shimla district such as Theog, Narkanda, Kumarsain, Kotgarh, Kotkhai, Rampur Bushahr, and Rohru to many parts of Shimla as well as to other cities like Solan, Chandigarh, Delhi, etc. It is one of the busiest tunnels of Shimla and traffic heavy at maximum times.

== See also ==
- Tunnels in North West India
- Lists of tunnels
