= Sanjay Chauhan (politician) =

- संजय चौहान
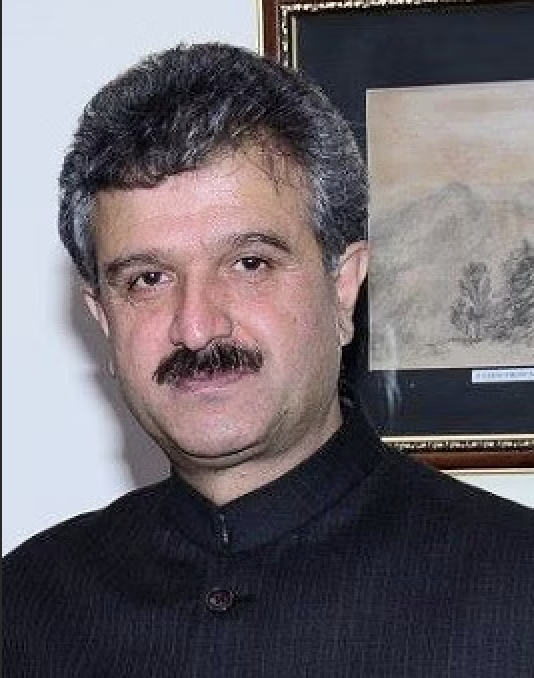

12th Mayor of Shimla Municipal Corporation
- In office 29 May 2012 – 18 June 2017
- Deputy: Tikender Singh Panwar

Personal details
- Party: Communist Party of India (Marxist)
- Education: St. Edward's School, Shimla
- Occupation: Politician

Sanjay Chauhan is a communist politician who remained the Mayor of Shimla Municipal Corporation from May 2012 to June 2017. He is currently the secretary of Himachal Pradesh state unit of Communist Party of India (Marxist).

== Early life ==
He joined SFI (Student Federation of India) in college and later became a member of CPI(M).

== Career ==
=== Shimla district secretary of CPI(M) ===
As district secretary of CPI(M) Chauhan defended the rights of street vendors and opposed the move of Congress government to evict them.

=== Mayor of Shimla ===
Sanjay Chauhan became the mayor, beating BJP's SS Minhas by 7,868 votes in 2012 elections. Tikender Singh Panwar of CPM became the Deputy Mayor who beat BJP rival Digvijay Singh by 4,748 votes. Sanjay Chauhan was the first Mayor of Shimla from CPI(M).

=== Legislative Assembly election performances ===
Sanjay Chauhan unsuccessfully contested from Shimla Assembly constituency in 2003, 2007 and 2017. In 2003 and 2007, he stood in 2nd position. He had lost to Congress candidate by a slender margin of around 2111 votes in 2003 and to BJP candidate merely by 2588 votes in 2007. He stood in 3rd position in 2017 after BJP candidate Suresh Bhardwaj and independent candidate Harish Janartha.

=== Himachal Pradesh state secretary of CPI(M) ===
He was elected as state secretary of CPI(M) in 18th state conference on 30 November 2024.
