= Vidya Stokes =

Indian politician

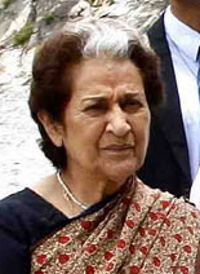

Minister of Irrigation & Public Health, Horticulture & Information Technology Government of Himachal Pradesh
- In office 25 December 2012 – 27 December 2017
- Chief Minister: Virbhadra Singh
- Succeeded by: Vipin Singh Parmar

Minister for Power Government of Himachal Pradesh
- In office 6 March 2003 – 28 December 2007
- Chief Minister: Virbhadra Singh

Member of Himachal Pradesh Legislative Assembly
- In office 2012–2017
- Preceded by: Rakesh Verma
- Succeeded by: Rakesh Singha
- Constituency: Theog
- In office 2003–2012
- Preceded by: Jai Bihari Lal Khachi
- Succeeded by: Constituency Abolished
- Constituency: Kumarsain
- In office 1998–2003
- Preceded by: Rakesh Verma
- Succeeded by: Rakesh Verma
- Constituency: Theog
- In office 1982–1993
- Preceded by: Mehar Singh Chauhan
- Succeeded by: Rakesh Verma
- Constituency: Theog
- In office 1974–1977
- Preceded by: Lal Chand Stokes
- Succeeded by: Mehar Singh Chauhan
- Constituency: Theog

Leader of Opposition in Himachal Pradesh Legislative Assembly
- In office 22 January 2008 – 25 December 2012
- Preceded by: Prem Kumar Dhumal
- Succeeded by: Prem Kumar Dhumal
- In office 21 March 1990 – 15 December 1992
- Preceded by: Jagdev Chand
- Succeeded by: Jagat Prakash Nadda

Speaker of Himachal Pradesh Legislative Assembly
- In office 11 March 1985 – 19 March 1990
- Preceded by: Thakur Sen Negi
- Succeeded by: Radha Raman Shastri

Personal details
- Born: 8 December 1927 (age 98) Kotgarh, Punjab, British India (now in Himachal Pradesh, India)
- Party: Indian National Congress
- Spouse: Lal Chand Stokes (d. 1974)

Vidya Stokes (born 8 December 1927) is an Indian politician and a member of the Indian National Congress from 1970 and of Himachal Pradesh Congress Committee since 1974. She was an elected member of Himachal Pradesh Legislative Assembly in 1974, 1982, 1985, 1990, 1998, 2003, 2007 and 2012.

== Early Life ==
She was born at Kotgarh village of Kumarsain tehsil in Shimla District of Himachal Pradesh, India on 8 December 1927. She is an under graduate and was educated at University of Delhi.

== Personal life ==
She married Shri. Lal Chand Stokes who was a Horticulturist, social worker and Former MLA from Theog Assembly Constituency in 1972.

She is the daughter-in-law of noted social worker Satyananda Stokes (an American settled in India), who later became a pioneer in horticulture in Himachal Pradesh. She has two sons and one daughter who live in the U.S.

== President of Hockey India ==
Vidya Stokes at the age of 83 was elected Hockey India president on 5 August 2010 after defeating Pargat Singh. Vidya Stokes's nomination was initially in violation of the age stipulation of 70 in the government guidelines.

== Political Career ==
She was a nominated member of All India Congress Committee, 1976. She was appointed General Secretary of Pradesh Congress Committee, 1977. She was the chairperson of Finance Committee of the Pradesh Congress during Lok Sabha General Elections, 1980. She was the observer of All India Congress Committee for-

- Sikkim, Assembly elections, 1994,
- Re constitution of Congress Party in Assam, 1994,
- Elections to Punjab Legislative Assembly, 1997.

She also represented India in the Asian Women’s Co-operative Conference which was held at Kuala-Lumpur during the International Women's year, 1977. She served as the Director of the State Bank of India. She was in Delhi Board from 1973 until 1974. She remained the President of State Co-operative Union for a period of four years. She also served on the Editorial Board of the Co-operative Magazine. She is the vice-chairperson of National Farmers Forum and the President of State Unit of National Farmers Forum. She was the Vice- Chairperson of HPMC Limited from November 1980 to 14 November 1984. She was the President of Indian Women’s Hockey Association in 1984, 1988, 1994 and 2003. She represented India in various international sports events and accompanied the India women's national field hockey team during the World Cup held in Spain. She has continued in the post of State Chief Commissioner of The Scouts/Guides Organisation an organisation Member of World Federation of Independent Scouts, (WFIS) Germany. She is the oldest winner in Himachal Pradesh and has won in the assembly elections for the eighth time in the year 2012.
