= Harish Janartha =

Indian politician

Member of the Himachal Pradesh Legislative Assembly
- Incumbent
- Assumed office 8 December 2022
- Preceded by: Suresh Bhardwaj
- Constituency: Shimla

Personal details
- Born: 18 May 1965 (age 61)
- Party: Indian National Congress
- Spouse: Kusum Janartha
- Children: One Son
- Education: Panjab University

Harish Janartha (born 18 May 1965) is an Indian politician from Himachal Pradesh. He won the 2022 Himachal Pradesh Legislative Assembly election from Shimla Assembly constituency representing the Indian National Congress.

== Early life and education ==
Janartha was born in Kashani village, Tikkar (Rohru) in an Indian politician family from the Shimla district. He is the son of late Roshna Janartha and late Jawahar Janartha. He did his schooling at Bishop Cotton School, Shimla, and later graduated in 1986 from the Punjab University, Chandigarh. He married Kusum Janartha, and together they have a son.

== Career ==
Janartha was a member of the National Students' Union of India from 1982 to 1986. Later, he continued to be active in the State Youth Congress from 1986 to 1994 and the District Congress Committee in Shimla from 1994 to 2000. He served as an executive council member (finance) at Himachal Pradesh University and as an executive member of the Pradesh Congress Committee from 2012 to 2022.

He also served as a councilor of the Municipal Corporation in Shimla twice, first from 2002 to 2007 and then from 2007 to 2012. Later, he became the Deputy Mayor of the Municipal Corporation, Shimla, from 2007 to 2012. In April 2022, he became the vice president of the Himachal Pradesh Congress Committee.

He won the 2022 Himachal Pradesh Legislative Assembly election from Shimla Assembly constituency representing the Indian National Congress and defeated his nearest rival Sanjay Sood. Thus, INC won after 15 years from this constituency and BJP lost it after 15 years. In 2017, he lost as an Independent candidate while he lost to the same candidate, Bhardwaj, in 2012 on Congress ticket. He rejoined the Indian National Congress in 2019.
