= Nawar Valley =

Valley in Himachal Pradesh

Tikkar Nawar Valley
- Village
- Location in Himachal Pradesh Location in India
- Coordinates: 31.1899°N 77.6261°E
- Country: India
- State: Himachal Pradesh
- District: Shimla

Government
  - Type: Gram panchayat
  - Body: Gram Panchayat Tikkar

Area
  - Total: 70 km^{2} (27 sq mi)
- Elevation: 2,250 m (7,380 ft)

Population (2011)
  - Total: 13,806
  - Density: 200/km^{2} (510/sq mi)

Languages
  - Official: Hindi
  - Regional: Mahasui Pahari
- Time zone: UTC+5:30 (IST)
- PIN: 171203
- STD code: 01781
- Vehicle registration: HP-10

Tikkar (situated in and colloquially known as Nawar Valley) is a village and a tehsil which falls under Rohru subdivision in Shimla district of Himachal Pradesh state, India. It is 44 km (27 mi) east of the district headquarters and the state capital Shimla city. The pin code of the area is 171203 and the post office is situated at Tikkar village. Tikkar is surrounded by Nankhari tehsil towards the north, Rohru tehsil towards the east, Kotkhai tehsil towards the west. Shimla, Solan, Nahan, Kalka are the nearby cities from here. It comes under Shimla parliamentary constituency for Lok Sabha and Jubbal Kotkhai assembly constituency for Himachal Pradesh Vidhan Sabha.

Nearby villages include Badshal, Samra, Hanstari, Daroti, Khangta, Gujandli, Kashani, Thana, Dhanoti, etc. There is a popular tourist attraction named Deorighat about 4 km (2.5 mi) from Tikkar.

During the British Raj, the area was ruled by the Rajas of princely state of Bushahr and the area came under Simla Hill States of Punjab States Agency in Punjab Province. Mahasui Pahari is the local language of the area. Traditional clothing of the area includes Bushahri Topi cap, Dhatu headscarf, Gachi belt and Rezta gown. Nati is the folk dance here.
