= Rohit Thakur =

Indian politician (born 1964)

Cabinet Minister, Government of Himachal Pradesh
- Incumbent
- Assumed office 8 January 2023
- Governor: Rajendra Arlekar (2022–2023); Shiv Pratap Shukla (2023–2026); Kavinder Gupta (2026–present)
- Cabinet: Sukhu ministry
- Chief Minister: Sukhvinder Singh Sukhu
- Ministry and Departments: Higher Education and Elementary Education

Member of the Himachal Pradesh Legislative Assembly
- Incumbent
- Assumed office 2 November 2021
- Preceded by: Narinder Bragta
- Constituency: Jubbal-Kotkhai
- In office 20 December 2012 – 18 December 2017
- Preceded by: Narinder Bragta
- Succeeded by: Narinder Bragta
- Constituency: Jubbal-Kotkhai
- In office 5 March 2003 – 30 December 2007
- Preceded by: Thakur Ram Lal
- Succeeded by: Narinder Bragta
- Constituency: Jubbal-Kotkhai

Personal details
- Born: 14 August 1974 (age 51)
- Party: Indian National Congress
- Spouse: Pratibha Thakur
- Children: One Son & two daughters
- Parent: Jagdish Thakur (father)
- Education: BA (Hons.) in Political Science
- Alma mater: Panjab University, Chandigarh

Rohit Thakur is a Member of Legislative Assembly representing Jubbal-Kotkhai constituency in the Himachal Pradesh Legislative Assembly in India. He is the grandson of former chief minister of Himachal Pradesh Thakur Ram Lal. He is a member of Indian National Congress.

He graduated from Panjab University, Chandigarh with a degree in political science.

== Early life ==
Born on 14 August 1974 in Shimla, Rohit Thakur is the son of Smt. Sarita Thakur and the late Shri Jagdish Thakur. He pursued his BA (Hons.) in Political Science. Rohit Thakur is married to Smt. Pratibha, and the couple has one son and two daughters. He is a horticulturist by profession.

Coming from a political lineage as the grandson of the former Chief Minister, late Thakur Ram Lal, Rohit Thakur entered into active politics at a very young age.

== Political engagement ==
Rohit Thakur has actively contributed to the political landscape of the state. He served as a Member of the Pradesh Youth Congress State Executive from 2000 to 2004 and has been associated with the HPCC from Jubbal-Kotkhai since 2002. Additionally, he held the position of Secretary, HPCC, from 2008 to 2011 and became a Member of Co-opted AICC in 2017.

== Legislative career ==
Elected to the State Legislative Assembly in 2003 and 2012, Rohit Thakur played a crucial role as the Chief Parliamentary Secretary from May 2013 to December 2017. He was re-elected to the Himachal Pradesh Vidhan Sabha for the third time in the by-election held on 30 October 2021. Further, he was re-elected to the 14th Legislative Assembly in December 2022.

== Special interests ==
Rohit Thakur's special interests include agriculture/horticulture, wildlife, music, and reading, particularly the cultural history of the Pradesh.

== Languages known ==
Fluent in Hindi and English, Rohit Thakur possesses strong linguistic skills for effective communication.

== Sports ==
His interests in sports include chess and football.

== Electoral performance ==
2021 Himachal Pradesh Legislative Assembly by-election : Jubbal-Kotkhai
Party	Candidate	Votes	%	±%
INC	Rohit Thakur	29,955	52.92%	▲5.03
Independent	Chetan Singh Bragta	23,662	41.80%	New
BJP	Neelam Seraik	2,644	4.67%	▼45.14
Margin of victory		6,293	11.12%	▲9.19
Turnout		56,607	78.51%	▼2.17
Registered electors		70,965		▲5.46
INC gain from BJP		Swing	▲3.10	
