= Rakesh Singha =

Indian politician

Member of Legislative Assembly (MLA) in Himachal Pradesh Legislative Assembly
- In office 2017–2022
- Preceded by: Vidya Stokes
- Succeeded by: Kuldeep Singh Rathore
- Constituency: Theog
- In office 1993–1996
- Preceded by: Suresh Bhardwaj
- Succeeded by: Adarsh Kumar
- Constituency: Shimla

Personal details
- Born: 8 December 1956 (age 69) Shimla, Himachal Pradesh, India
- Party: Communist Party of India (Marxist)

Rakesh Singha (born 8 December 1956) is an Indian communist politician and a former member of the Himachal Pradesh Legislative Assembly representing the Communist Party of India (Marxist). He was a former member of the Central Committee of the CPI(M) and former secretary of CPI(M) Himachal Pradesh state committee.

== Career ==
Singha was first elected in 1993 as member of the legislative assembly (MLA) representing the Shimla constituency. However, he was disqualified from holding his seat following a decision of the Supreme Court which upheld his 1987 conviction for involvement in a murder case from 1978 during his time as a student.

He came on third position in the 2012 Himachal Pradesh Legislative Assembly election from Theog.

In 2017, Singha was elected from the Theog constituency to the Legislative Assembly. However, in 2022 Himachal Pradesh Legislative Assembly election, he was defeated by Indian National Congress's Kuldeep Singh Rathore.

== Electoral performance ==
2012 Himachal Pradesh Legislative Assembly election: Theog
Party	Candidate	Votes	%	±%
INC	Vidya Stokes	21,478	38.69	▲1.91
BJP	Rakesh Verma	17,202	30.98	▲18.82
CPI(M)	Rakesh Singha	10,379	18.69	New
AITC	Pramod Kumar Sharma	4,480	8.07	New
Independent	Ram Lal Sharma	988	1.78	New
Independent	Roshan Lal	497	0.90	New
BSP	Vinay Kumar	362	0.65	▼1.74
Margin of victory		4,276	7.70	▼3.99
Turnout		55,519	74.96	▼2.63
Registered electors		74,060		▲27.15
INC gain from Independent		Swing	▼9.79	

2017 Himachal Pradesh Legislative Assembly election: Theog
Party	Candidate	Votes	%	±%
CPI(M)	Rakesh Singha	24,791	42.17	▲23.48
BJP	Rakesh Verma	22,808	38.80	▲7.82
INC	Deepak Rathour	9,101	15.48	▼23.20
Independent	Devi Ram Sharma	641	1.09	New
NOTA	None of the Above	383	0.65	New
Independent	Roshan Lal	294	0.50	New
Margin of victory		1,983	3.37	▼4.33
Turnout		58,784	74.85	▼0.12
Registered electors		78,540		▲6.05
CPI(M) gain from INC		Swing	▲3.49	

2022 Himachal Pradesh Legislative Assembly election: Theog
Party	Candidate	Votes	%	±%
INC	Kuldeep Singh Rathore	19,447	29.47	▲13.99
BJP	Ajay Shyam	14,178	21.49	▼17.31
Independent	Indu Varma	13,848	20.99	New
CPI(M)	Rakesh Singha	12,210	18.51	▼23.66
Independent	Vijay Pal Khachi	4,576	6.94	New
Independent	Amit Mehta	581	0.88	New
AAP	Attar Singh Chandel	487	0.74	New
NOTA	Nota	349	0.53	▼0.12
BSP	Jia Lal Sadhak	304	0.46	New
Margin of victory		5,269	7.99	▲4.61
Turnout		65,980	76.51	▲1.67
Registered electors		86,236		▲9.80
INC gain from CPI(M)		Swing	▼12.70	
