= Kharki =

- village
- Location in Himachal Pradesh, India Kharki (India)
- Coordinates: 31.111°N 77.458°E
- Country: India
- State: Himachal Pradesh
- District: Shimla

Area
  - Total: 1.23 km^{2} (0.47 sq mi)
- Elevation: 1,690 m (5,540 ft)

Population (2001)
  - Total: 273
  - Density: 222/km^{2} (575/sq mi)

Languages
  - Official: Hindi
  - Regional: Mahasu Pahari (Shimla Saraji)
- Time zone: UTC+5:30 (IST)
- PIN: 171202
- Telephone code: 911783xxxxxx
- Vehicle registration: HP-09

Kharki is a village of Himachal Pradesh, under Tehsil Kotkhai, Shimla district, India.

== Village Profile ==
As of Census of India 2001

Area details
Area of village – 123 hectares
Number of households – 56
Population data based on 2001 census
Total population – 273

Females – 150
Males – 123

Education facilities
Education facilities – Available
Number of primary schools – 1
Middle schools – 1
Number of secondary schools 1
College available within range – More than 10 km
Medical facilities
Allopathic hospitals available within range – More than 10 km
Number of ayurvedic dispensary – 1
Primary health centre available within range – Within 5 km
Post, telegraph and telephone facilities
Post office – 1
Number of telephone connections – 18
Approach to villages
Nearest town – Kotkhai
Distance from the nearest town – 17 km
Land use in hectares
Unirrigated area – 49.00
Culturable waste (including gauchar and groves) – 70.00
Area not available for cultivation – 4.00
