= Jai Bihari Lal Khachi =

Indian politician

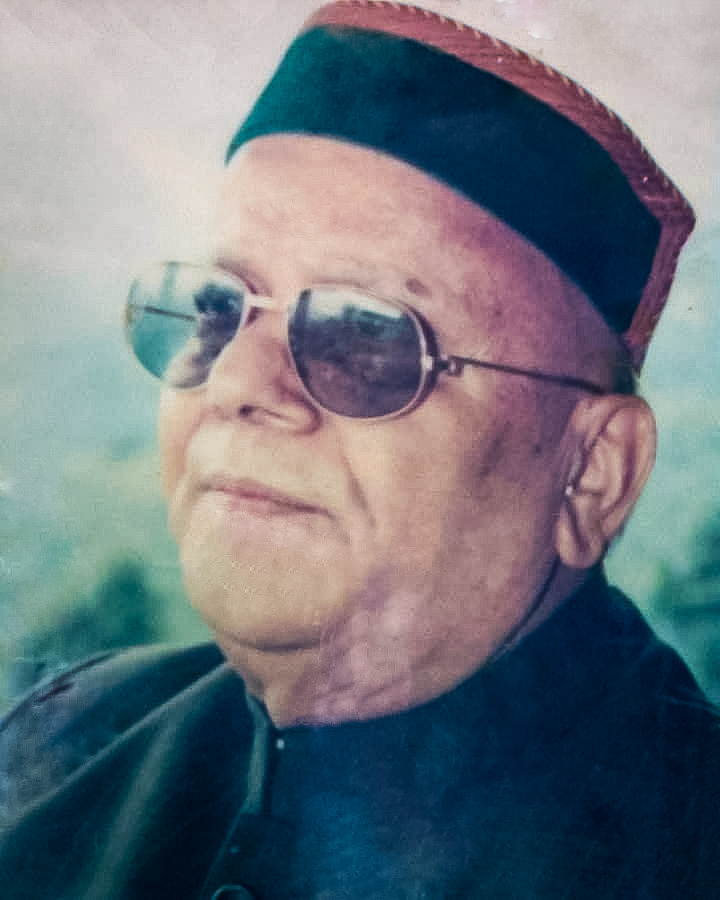

Minister for Public Works, Government of Himachal Pradesh
- In office 3 December 1993 – 23 March 1998
- Chief minister: Virbhadra Singh

Minister for Co-operation and Transport, Government of Himachal Pradesh
- In office 16 March 1989 – 5 March 1990
- Chief Minister: Virbhadra Singh

Minister for Co-operation, Planning and Implementation of the 20-Point Programme, Government of Himachal Pradesh
- In office 8 April 1983 – 8 March 1985
- Chief Minister: Virbhadra Singh

Member of Legislative Assembly (MLA) in Himachal Pradesh Legislative Assembly
- In office 1993–2002
- Preceded by: Bhagat Ram Chauhan
- Succeeded by: Vidya Stokes
- Constituency: Kumarsain
- In office 1982–1990
- Preceded by: Bhaskera Nand
- Succeeded by: Bhagat Ram Chauhan
- Constituency: Kumarsain
- In office 1972–1977
- Preceded by: Ram Dayal
- Succeeded by: Bhaskera Nand
- Constituency: Kumarsain
- In office 1967–1972
- Preceded by: Devi Ram
- Succeeded by: Lal Chand Stokes
- Constituency: Theog

Personal details
- Born: 5 May 1927 Kumarsain, Punjab, British India (now in Himachal Pradesh, India)
- Died: 11 April 2002 (aged 74) Shimla, Himachal Pradesh, India
- Cause of death: Segment Elevation Myocardial Infarction
- Party: Indian National Congress
- Education: St. Stephen's College, Delhi; University of Delhi
- Occupation: Politician

Jai Bihari Lal Khachi or J.B.L Khachi (5 May 1927 – 11 April 2002) was an Indian politician from Kumarsain in Shimla District of Himachal Pradesh, India. He was a former 3 times cabinet minister of Himachal Pradesh and a member of the Indian National Congress.

== Early life ==
J.B.L Khachi was born on 5 May 1927 at Ghumana village of Kumharsain tehsil in Shimla district of Himachal Pradesh. His father, Hira Nand Khachi, was a man of progressive views and was very disciplined. Khachi became a Law graduate from Lahore. He then pursued his further studies from the University of Delhi.

== Political career ==
After his studies, he returned to Himachal Pradesh and joined the co-operative movement in the state. He contested his first two elections of Himachal Pradesh Legislative Assembly in 1967 and 1972 as Independent candidate and in both he won. In 1977 he joined Indian National Congress. He was elected 6 times as MLA, one time from Theog constituency in 1967 and 5 times from Kumarsain constituency in 1972, 1982, 1985, 1993 and 1998. He also remained 3 times minister in Virbhadra Singh's cabinet.

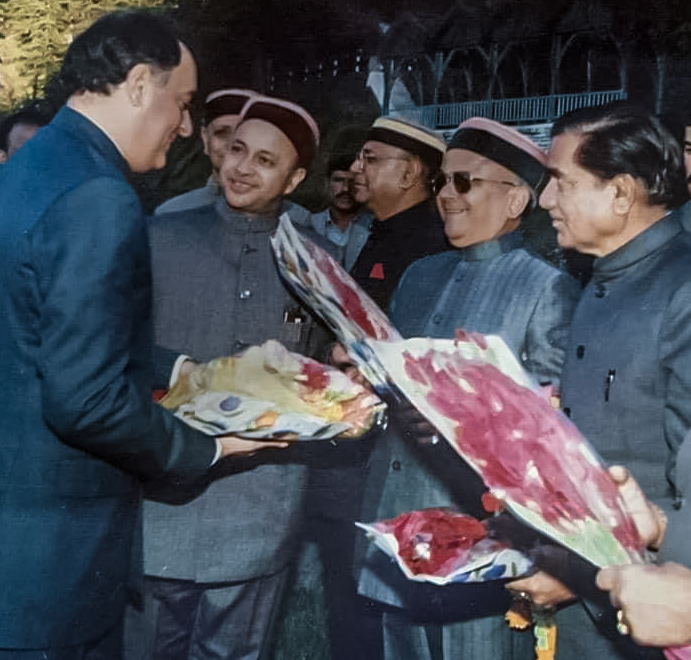
From left to right: Rajiv Gandhi, Virbhadra Singh, Sat Mahajan (in back), Jai Bihari Lal Khachi and Sagar Chand Nayyar during Rajiv Gandhi's visit to Shimla

J.B.L Khachi and Thakur Sen Negi founded Himachal Pradesh Lok Raj Party (LRP) in 1967. LRP contested the 1971 Lok Sabha elections and the 1972 state assembly elections.

In the 1972 state assembly elections LRP had put up candidates in 16 out of 68 constituencies. Two were elected as MLA from Kinnaur and Arki constituency. The party was dissolved just before the 1977 state assembly elections.

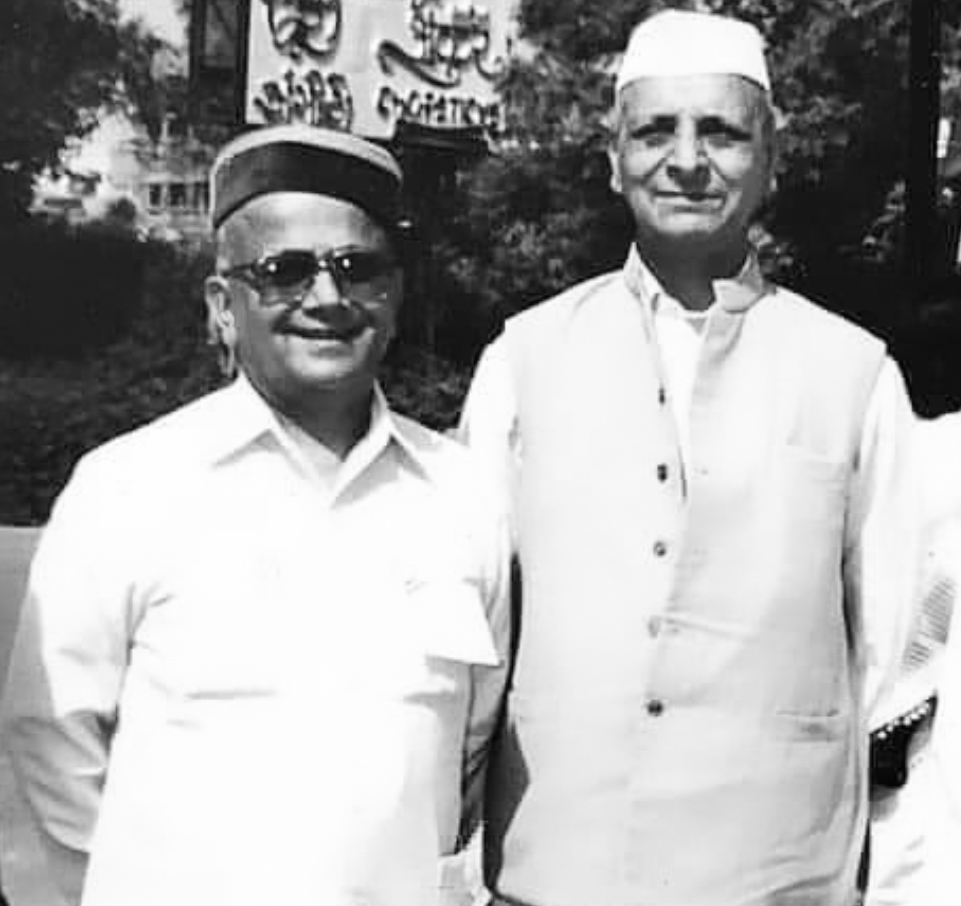
J.B.L Khachi (on left) with Pandit Sant Ram (former Agriculture Minister of Himachal Pradesh)

Apart from being at various times MLA and cabinet minister, he was also the Chairman of Working group (1967–1970), General Secretary of the Progressive front in Himachal Pradesh Vidhan Sabha (1970–1973), President of the Himachal Pradesh State Cooperative Union (1962–1974) and General Secretary of the Himachal Pradesh Congress Committee (1990–1993). He had also given speech in the annual meeting of the World Economic Forum held in Davos, Switzerland.

== Death ==
Khachi died of a massive heart attack on the morning of 11 April 2002. At that time Khachi was the sitting MLA of Kumarsain constituency.

== See also ==
- Kumarsain
- Kumarsain Assembly constituency
- Theog Assembly constituency
