= Jubbal-Kotkhai Assembly constituency =

Legislative Assembly constituency in Himachal Pradesh State, India

Coordinates: 31.11°N 77.67°E

Jubbal-Kotkhai
- Constituency No. 65 for the Himachal Pradesh Legislative Assembly

Constituency details
- Country: India
- Region: North India
- State: Himachal Pradesh
- District: Shimla
- Lok Sabha constituency: Shimla
- Established: 1951
- Total electors: 73,362
- Reservation: None

Member of Legislative Assembly
- 14th Himachal Pradesh Legislative Assembly
- Incumbent Rohit Thakur
- Party: Indian National Congress
- Elected year: 2021

Jubbal-Kotkhai Assembly constituency is one of the 68 constituencies in the Himachal Pradesh Legislative Assembly, covering the area of Jubbal, Kotkhai and Nawar. Jubbal Kotkhai constituency is a part of Shimla Lok Sabha constituency.

== Members of the Legislative Assembly ==
| Year | Member | Party |
|---|---|---|
| 1952 | Bala Nand | Indian National Congress |
| 1967 | R. Lal | Indian National Congress |
| 1972 | Thakur Ram Lal | Indian National Congress |
| 1977 | Thakur Ram Lal | Indian National Congress |
| 1982 | Thakur Ram Lal | Indian National Congress |
| 1985 | Virbhadra Singh | Indian National Congress |
| 1990 | Thakur Ram Lal | Janata Dal |
| 1993 | Thakur Ram Lal | Indian National Congress |
| 1998 | Thakur Ram Lal | Indian National Congress |
| 2003 | Rohit Thakur | Indian National Congress |
| 2007 | Narinder Bragta | Bharatiya Janata Party |
| 2012 | Rohit Thakur | Indian National Congress |
| 2017 | Narinder Bragta | Bharatiya Janata Party |
| 2021 By-election | Rohit Thakur | Indian National Congress |
| 2022 | Rohit Thakur | Indian National Congress |

== Election results ==
=== Assembly Election 2022 ===
2022 Himachal Pradesh Legislative Assembly election: Jubbal-Kotkhai
| Party | Candidate | Votes | % | ±% |
|---|---|---|---|---|
| INC | Rohit Thakur | 31,393 | 52.65% | ▼0.27 |
| BJP | Chetan Singh Bragta | 26,324 | 44.15% | ▲39.48 |
| CPI(M) | Vishal Shankta | 1,256 | 2.11% | New |
| BSP | Ram Pal | 239 | 0.40% | New |
| NOTA | Nota | 187 | 0.31% | New |
| AAP | Shrikant Chauhan | 163 | 0.27% | New |
| Independent | Suman Kadam | 65 | 0.11% | New |
| Margin of victory | | 5,069 | 8.50% | ▼2.62 |
| Turnout | | 59,627 | 81.28% | ▲1.51 |
| Registered electors | | 73,362 | | ▲3.38 |
| INC hold | | Swing | ▼0.27 | |

=== Assembly By-election 2021 ===
2021 Himachal Pradesh Legislative Assembly by-election : Jubbal-Kotkhai
| Party | Candidate | Votes | % | ±% |
|---|---|---|---|---|
| INC | Rohit Thakur | 29,955 | 52.92% | ▲5.03 |
| Independent | Chetan Singh Bragta | 23,662 | 41.80% | New |
| BJP | Neelam Seraik | 2,644 | 4.67% | ▼45.14 |
| Margin of victory | | 6,293 | 11.12% | ▲9.19 |
| Turnout | | 56,607 | 78.51% | ▼2.17 |
| Registered electors | | 70,965 | | ▲5.46 |
| INC gain from BJP | | Swing | ▲3.10 | |

=== Assembly Election 2017 ===
2017 Himachal Pradesh Legislative Assembly election: Jubbal-Kotkhai
| Party | Candidate | Votes | % | ±% |
|---|---|---|---|---|
| BJP | Narinder Bragta | 27,466 | 49.81% | ▲10.18 |
| INC | Rohit Thakur | 26,404 | 47.89% | ▼9.66 |
| Independent | Lokinder Jhouta | 370 | 0.67% | New |
| NOTA | None of the Above | 289 | 0.52% | New |
| Margin of victory | | 1,062 | 1.93% | ▼15.99 |
| Turnout | | 55,137 | 81.94% | ▲2.76 |
| Registered electors | | 67,289 | | ▲4.94 |
| BJP gain from INC | | Swing | ▼7.74 | |

=== Assembly Election 2012 ===
2012 Himachal Pradesh Legislative Assembly election: Jubbal-Kotkhai
| Party | Candidate | Votes | % | ±% |
|---|---|---|---|---|
| INC | Rohit Thakur | 29,219 | 57.55% | ▲11.28 |
| BJP | Narinder Bragta | 20,124 | 39.64% | ▼12.89 |
| BSP | Ram Lal Kesta | 683 | 1.35% | ▲0.17 |
| Independent | Lokinder Chauhan | 632 | 1.24% | New |
| Margin of victory | | 9,095 | 17.91% | ▲11.66 |
| Turnout | | 50,770 | 79.18% | ▲2.65 |
| Registered electors | | 64,121 | | ▲8.70 |
| INC gain from BJP | | Swing | ▲5.02 | |

=== Assembly Election 2007 ===
2007 Himachal Pradesh Legislative Assembly election: Jubbal-Kotkhai
| Party | Candidate | Votes | % | ±% |
|---|---|---|---|---|
| BJP | Narinder Bragta | 23,714 | 52.53% | ▲15.27 |
| INC | Rohit Thakur | 20,890 | 46.27% | ▼7.95 |
| BSP | Bobby Sawant | 532 | 1.18% | New |
| Margin of victory | | 2,824 | 6.26% | ▼10.70 |
| Turnout | | 45,145 | 76.53% | ▼1.08 |
| Registered electors | | 58,990 | | ▲13.42 |
| BJP gain from INC | | Swing | | |

=== Assembly Election 2003 ===
2003 Himachal Pradesh Legislative Assembly election: Jubbal-Kotkhai
| Party | Candidate | Votes | % | ±% |
|---|---|---|---|---|
| INC | Rohit Thakur | 21,884 | 54.22% | ▼15.12 |
| BJP | Narinder Singh | 15,040 | 37.26% | ▲25.41 |
| HVC | Rajpal Singh | 1,817 | 4.50% | ▲2.41 |
| LHMP | Inder Singh | 1,621 | 4.02% | New |
| Margin of victory | | 6,844 | 16.96% | ▼35.67 |
| Turnout | | 40,362 | 77.95% | ▲8.76 |
| Registered electors | | 52,009 | | ▲4.48 |
| INC hold | | Swing | ▼15.12 | |

=== Assembly Election 1998 ===
1998 Himachal Pradesh Legislative Assembly election: Jubbal-Kotkhai
| Party | Candidate | Votes | % | ±% |
|---|---|---|---|---|
| INC | Thakur Ram Lal | 23,762 | 69.34% | ▲0.41 |
| JD | Raj Pal | 5,728 | 16.71% | New |
| BJP | Suresh Chauhan | 4,062 | 11.85% | ▼3.62 |
| HVC | Het Ram | 717 | 2.09% | New |
| Margin of victory | | 18,034 | 52.62% | ▼0.70 |
| Turnout | | 34,269 | 70.35% | ▼2.43 |
| Registered electors | | 49,777 | | ▲12.46 |
| INC hold | | Swing | ▲0.41 | |

=== Assembly Election 1993 ===
1993 Himachal Pradesh Legislative Assembly election: Jubbal-Kotkhai
| Party | Candidate | Votes | % | ±% |
|---|---|---|---|---|
| INC | Thakur Ram Lal | 21,745 | 68.93% | ▲21.82 |
| Independent | Rajpal Singh Chauhan | 4,922 | 15.60% | New |
| BJP | Narinder Bragta | 4,880 | 15.47% | New |
| Margin of victory | | 16,823 | 53.33% | ▲48.57 |
| Turnout | | 31,547 | 71.82% | ▼5.48 |
| Registered electors | | 44,260 | | ▲8.70 |
| INC gain from JD | | Swing | | |

=== Assembly Election 1990 ===
1990 Himachal Pradesh Legislative Assembly election: Jubbal-Kotkhai
| Party | Candidate | Votes | % | ±% |
|---|---|---|---|---|
| JD | Thakur Ram Lal | 16,209 | 51.87% | New |
| INC | Virbhadra Singh | 14,723 | 47.11% | ▼36.89 |
| JP | Bela Ram Chauhan | 320 | 1.02% | New |
| Margin of victory | | 1,486 | 4.75% | ▼68.11 |
| Turnout | | 31,252 | 77.27% | ▲2.57 |
| Registered electors | | 40,718 | | ▲26.07 |
| JD gain from INC | | Swing | | |

=== Assembly Election 1985 ===
1985 Himachal Pradesh Legislative Assembly election: Jubbal-Kotkhai
| Party | Candidate | Votes | % | ±% |
|---|---|---|---|---|
| INC | Virbhadra Singh | 20,125 | 84.00% | ▼1.34 |
| Independent | Prakash Chand | 2,667 | 11.13% | New |
| BJP | Shyam Lal Pirta | 1,167 | 4.87% | ▼8.86 |
| Margin of victory | | 17,458 | 72.87% | ▲1.25 |
| Turnout | | 23,959 | 74.56% | ▼5.23 |
| Registered electors | | 32,299 | | ▲5.41 |
| INC hold | | Swing | ▼1.34 | |

=== Assembly Election 1982 ===
1982 Himachal Pradesh Legislative Assembly election: Jubbal-Kotkhai
| Party | Candidate | Votes | % | ±% |
|---|---|---|---|---|
| INC | Thakur Ram Lal | 20,765 | 85.34% | ▲25.15 |
| BJP | Shyam Lal Pirta | 3,340 | 13.73% | New |
| Independent | Rajinder Singh | 178 | 0.73% | New |
| Margin of victory | | 17,425 | 71.61% | ▲42.82 |
| Turnout | | 24,332 | 80.18% | ▲10.46 |
| Registered electors | | 30,642 | | ▲14.41 |
| INC hold | | Swing | ▲25.15 | |

=== Assembly Election 1977 ===
1977 Himachal Pradesh Legislative Assembly election: Jubbal-Kotkhai
| Party | Candidate | Votes | % | ±% |
|---|---|---|---|---|
| INC | Thakur Ram Lal | 11,115 | 60.19% | ▼33.63 |
| JP | Padam Singh Jhina | 5,799 | 31.41% | New |
| Independent | Guman Singh | 1,114 | 6.03% | New |
| Independent | Iswar Singh | 237 | 1.28% | New |
| Independent | Prem Singh Mehta | 144 | 0.78% | New |
| Margin of victory | | 5,316 | 28.79% | ▼60.35 |
| Turnout | | 18,465 | 69.95% | ▲4.21 |
| Registered electors | | 26,783 | | ▲7.01 |
| INC hold | | Swing | ▼33.63 | |

=== Assembly Election 1972 ===
1972 Himachal Pradesh Legislative Assembly election: Jubbal-Kotkhai
| Party | Candidate | Votes | % | ±% |
|---|---|---|---|---|
| INC | Thakur Ram Lal | 15,201 | 93.83% | ▲14.23 |
| ABJS | Prem Singh Mehta | 760 | 4.69% | New |
| Independent | Padam Singh Jhina | 240 | 1.48% | New |
| Margin of victory | | 14,441 | 89.14% | ▲20.86 |
| Turnout | | 16,201 | 65.75% | ▲5.17 |
| Registered electors | | 25,029 | | ▲13.04 |
| INC hold | | Swing | ▲14.23 | |

=== Assembly Election 1967 ===
1967 Himachal Pradesh Legislative Assembly election: Jubbal-Kotkhai
| Party | Candidate | Votes | % | ±% |
|---|---|---|---|---|
| INC | R. Lal | 10,496 | 79.59% | ▲79.12 |
| Independent | R. Singh | 1,492 | 11.31% | New |
| Independent | S. Nand | 689 | 5.22% | New |
| Independent | M. Lal | 510 | 3.87% | New |
| Margin of victory | | 9,004 | 68.28% | ▲45.03 |
| Turnout | | 13,187 | 62.78% | ▲16.84 |
| Registered electors | | 22,142 | | ▲50.12 |
| INC hold | | Swing | ▲31.88 | |

=== Assembly Election 1952 ===
1952 Himachal Pradesh Legislative Assembly election: Jubbal-Kotkhai
| Party | Candidate | Votes | % | ±% |
|---|---|---|---|---|
| INC | Bala Nand | 3,006 | 47.71% | New |
| KMPP | Bhag Mal Sautha | 1,541 | 24.46% | New |
| Independent | Huma Nand | 1,105 | 17.54% | New |
| Independent | Kesho Ram | 648 | 10.29% | New |
| Margin of victory | | 1,465 | 23.25% | |
| Turnout | | 6,300 | 42.71% | |
| Registered electors | | 14,750 | | |
| INC win (new seat) | | | | |

== See also ==
- Jubbal Kotkhai
- Shimla district
- List of constituencies of Himachal Pradesh Legislative Assembly
