= Shimla Assembly constituency =

Legislative Assembly constituency in Himachal Pradesh State, India

Coordinates: 31.09°N 77.18°E

Shimla
- Constituency No. 63 for the Himachal Pradesh Legislative Assembly

Constituency details
- Country: India
- Region: North India
- State: Himachal Pradesh
- District: Shimla
- Lok Sabha constituency: Shimla
- Established: 1967
- Total electors: 48,608
- Reservation: None

Member of Legislative Assembly
- 14th Himachal Pradesh Legislative Assembly
- Incumbent Harish Janartha
- Party: Indian National Congress
- Elected year: 2022

Shimla Assembly constituency, also spelt Simla in olden days, is one of the 68 assembly constituencies of Himachal Pradesh, a northern Indian state. It is a segment of the Shimla Lok Sabha constituency.

== Members of Legislative Assembly ==
- 1962 (Punjab Assembly): Gyan Chand (Congress), as part of Punjab State.
  - Shimla was merged with Himachal Pradesh in 1966.

Year	Member	Picture	Party
1967	Daulat Ram Chauhan		Bharatiya Jana Sangh
1972	Daulat Ram Chauhan		Bharatiya Jana Sangh
1977	Daulat Ram Chauhan		Janata Party
1982	Daulat Ram Chauhan		Bharatiya Janata Party
1985	Harbhajan Singh Bhajji		Indian National Congress
1990	Suresh Bhardwaj		Bharatiya Janata Party
1993	Rakesh Singha		Communist Party of India (Marxist)
1996 (Note: by-election)	Adarsh Kumar		Indian National Congress
1998	Narinder Bragta		Bharatiya Janata Party
2003	Harbhajan Singh Bhajji		Indian National Congress
2007	Suresh Bhardwaj		Bharatiya Janata Party
2012	Suresh Bhardwaj		Bharatiya Janata Party
2017	Suresh Bhardwaj		Bharatiya Janata Party
2022	Harish Janartha		Indian National Congress

== Election candidates ==
=== Assembly Election 2022 ===
2022 Himachal Pradesh Legislative Assembly election: Shimla
Party	Candidate	Votes	%	±%
INC	Harish Janartha	15,803	51.35%	▲43.12
BJP	Sanjay Sood	12,766	41.48%	▼1.54
CPI(M)	Tikender Singh Panwar	1,400	4.55%	▼4.81
AAP	Chaman Rakesh Azta	328	1.07%	New
NOTA	Nota	237	0.77%	▼0.22
Independent	Abhishek Barowalia	120	0.39%	New
Rashtriya Devbhumi Party	Kalyan Singh	78	0.25%	New
BSP	Rajesh Kumar Gill	46	0.15%	New
Margin of victory		3,037	9.87%	▲4.02
Turnout		30,778	63.32%	▼1.27
Registered electors		48,608		▼3.60
INC gain from BJP		Swing	▲8.32	

=== Assembly Election 2017 ===
2017 Himachal Pradesh Legislative Assembly election: Shimla
Party	Candidate	Votes	%	±%
BJP	Suresh Bhardwaj	14,012	43.02%	▲7.46
Independent	Harish Janartha	12,109	37.18%	New
CPI(M)	Sanjay Chauhan	3,047	9.36%	▼15.33
INC	Harbhajan Singh Bhajji	2,680	8.23%	▼25.41
NOTA	None of the Above	322	0.99%	New
Margin of victory		1,903	5.84%	▲3.91
Turnout		32,569	64.59%	▲5.38
Registered electors		50,424		▼8.16
BJP hold		Swing	▲7.46	

=== Assembly Election 2012 ===
2012 Himachal Pradesh Legislative Assembly election: Shimla
Party	Candidate	Votes	%	±%
BJP	Suresh Bhardwaj	11,563	35.57%	▼2.80
INC	Harish Janartha	10,935	33.63%	▲7.95
CPI(M)	Tikender Singh Panwar	8,025	24.68%	▼5.70
Independent	Tarsem Bharti	1,499	4.61%	New
NCP	Dr. Radha Raman Shastri	243	0.75%	New
Margin of victory		628	1.93%	▼6.05
Turnout		32,512	59.22%	▲12.01
Registered electors		54,905		▼20.11
BJP hold		Swing	▼2.80	

=== Assembly Election 2007 ===
2007 Himachal Pradesh Legislative Assembly election: Shimla
Party	Candidate	Votes	%	±%
BJP	Suresh Bhardwaj	12,443	38.36%	▲9.00
CPI(M)	Sanjay Chauhan	9,855	30.38%	▼1.09
INC	Harbhajan Singh Bhajji	8,330	25.68%	▼12.47
BSP	Ved Prakash	1,337	4.12%	New
Margin of victory		2,588	7.98%	▲1.30
Turnout		32,437	47.20%	▲1.09
Registered electors		68,722		▲0.23
BJP gain from INC		Swing	▲0.21	

=== Assembly Election 2003 ===
2003 Himachal Pradesh Legislative Assembly election: Shimla
Party	Candidate	Votes	%	±%
INC	Harbhajan Singh Bhajji	12,060	38.15%	▼0.77
CPI(M)	Sanjay Chauhan	9,949	31.47%	▲17.63
BJP	Ganesh Dutt	9,283	29.36%	▼17.88
Independent	Des Raj Sharma	323	1.02%	New
Margin of victory		2,111	6.68%	▼1.66
Turnout		31,615	46.14%	▲3.41
Registered electors		68,562		▼6.27
INC gain from BJP		Swing	▼9.10	

=== Assembly Election 1998 ===
1998 Himachal Pradesh Legislative Assembly election: Shimla
Party	Candidate	Votes	%	±%
BJP	Narinder Bragta	14,758	47.25%	▲14.53
INC	Harbhajan Singh Bhajji	12,155	38.91%	▼1.76
CPI(M)	Om Prakash	4,323	13.84%	▼10.73
Margin of victory		2,603	8.33%	▲0.38
Turnout		31,236	43.12%	▼6.62
Registered electors		73,148		▲3.26
BJP gain from INC		Swing		

=== Assembly By-election 1996 ===
1996 Himachal Pradesh Legislative Assembly by-election: Shimla
Party	Candidate	Votes	%	±%
INC	Adarsh Kumar	14,211	40.67%	▲7.35
BJP	Suresh Bhardwaj	11,433	32.72%	▲0.35
CPI(M)	Om Prakash	8,584	24.57%	▼9.20
	Des Raj Sharma	319	0.91%	New
BSP	Kishori Lal	276	0.79%	New
Margin of victory		2,778	7.95%	▲7.50
Turnout		34,943	49.62%	▼10.57
Registered electors		70,841		▲20.86
INC gain from CPI(M)		Swing	▲6.90	

=== Assembly Election 1993 ===
1993 Himachal Pradesh Legislative Assembly election: Shimla
Party	Candidate	Votes	%	±%
CPI(M)	Rakesh Singha	11,854	33.77%	▲7.86
INC	Harbhajan Singh Bhajji	11,695	33.31%	▲7.86
BJP	Suresh Bhardwaj	11,363	32.37%	▼15.61
Margin of victory		159	0.45%	▼21.62
Turnout		35,105	60.25%	▲17.41
Registered electors		58,614		▼5.92
CPI(M) gain from BJP		Swing		

=== Assembly Election 1990 ===
1990 Himachal Pradesh Legislative Assembly election: Shimla
Party	Candidate	Votes	%	±%
BJP	Suresh Bhardwaj	12,701	47.98%	▲11.64
CPI(M)	Rakesh Singha	6,857	25.90%	▲2.10
INC	Harbhajan Singh Bhajji	6,738	25.46%	▼13.68
Margin of victory		5,844	22.08%	▲19.28
Turnout		26,470	42.69%	▼8.71
Registered electors		62,302		▲41.44
BJP gain from INC		Swing		

=== Assembly Election 1985 ===
1985 Himachal Pradesh Legislative Assembly election: Shimla
Party	Candidate	Votes	%	±%
INC	Harbhajan Singh Bhajji	8,825	39.13%	▲1.52
BJP	Radha Raman Shastri	8,195	36.34%	▼13.09
CPI(M)	Rakesh Singha	5,368	23.80%	New
Margin of victory		630	2.79%	▼9.03
Turnout		22,552	51.48%	▼14.26
Registered electors		44,049		▲15.74
INC gain from BJP		Swing	▼10.30	

=== Assembly Election 1982 ===
1982 Himachal Pradesh Legislative Assembly election: Shimla
Party	Candidate	Votes	%	±%
BJP	Daulat Ram Chauhan	12,314	49.43%	New
INC	Anand Sharma	9,369	37.61%	▲19.28
Independent	Jagdish Chander Joshi	988	3.97%	New
Independent	D. R. Tanwar	655	2.63%	New
Independent	Ashok Kumar Goel	360	1.45%	New
CPI	H. L. Sethi	355	1.42%	New
Independent	Janki Dass	165	0.66%	New
JP	Lajiya Raghubir Singh	149	0.60%	▼70.06
Margin of victory		2,945	11.82%	▼40.52
Turnout		24,913	66.01%	▲13.78
Registered electors		38,057		▼1.47
BJP gain from JP		Swing	▼21.23	

=== Assembly Election 1977 ===
1977 Himachal Pradesh Legislative Assembly election: Shimla
Party	Candidate	Votes	%	±%
JP	Daulat Ram Chauhan	14,105	70.66%	New
INC	Usha Malhotra	3,658	18.33%	▼20.09
Independent	Sunder Lal	2,026	10.15%	New
Independent	Tilak Raj	113	0.57%	New
Margin of victory		10,447	52.34%	▲48.41
Turnout		19,961	52.07%	▲6.50
Registered electors		38,625		▲23.35
JP gain from ABJS		Swing	▲28.32	

=== Assembly Election 1972 ===
1972 Himachal Pradesh Legislative Assembly election: Shimla
Party	Candidate	Votes	%	±%
ABJS	Daulat Ram Chauhan	5,990	42.34%	▼18.81
INC	Shiv Dutt Bhardwaj	5,435	38.42%	▲11.74
Independent	Prithi Chand	1,880	13.29%	New
Independent	Surrinder Singh Ahuja	263	1.86%	New
INC(O)	Inder Chand Gupta	184	1.30%	New
SSP	J. Jacob	169	1.19%	New
Independent	Kali Dass Vasudeva	112	0.79%	New
Margin of victory		555	3.92%	▼30.55
Turnout		14,147	45.88%	▼2.15
Registered electors		31,314		▲34.90
ABJS hold		Swing	▼18.81	

=== Assembly Election 1967 ===
1967 Himachal Pradesh Legislative Assembly election: Shimla
Party	Candidate	Votes	%	±%
ABJS	D. Ram	6,718	61.15%	New
INC	G. Chand	2,931	26.68%	New
RPI	C. Singh	466	4.24%	New
Independent	J. Singh	364	3.31%	New
Independent	P. Lal	221	2.01%	New
PSP	G. Shanker	135	1.23%	New
Independent	A. Singh	125	1.14%	New
Margin of victory		3,787	34.47%	
Turnout		10,986	48.87%	
Registered electors		23,212		
ABJS win (new seat)				

== Election results ==
=== 2017 ===
Himachal Pradesh Legislative Assembly Election, 2017: Shimla
Party	Candidate	Votes	%	±%
BJP	Suresh Bhardwaj			
INC				
NOTA	None of the above			
Majority				
Turnout				
Registered electors				
BJP hold		Swing		

== See also ==
- List of constituencies of the Himachal Pradesh Legislative Assembly
- Shimla
- Shimla district
