= Thakur Ram Lal =

Indian politician

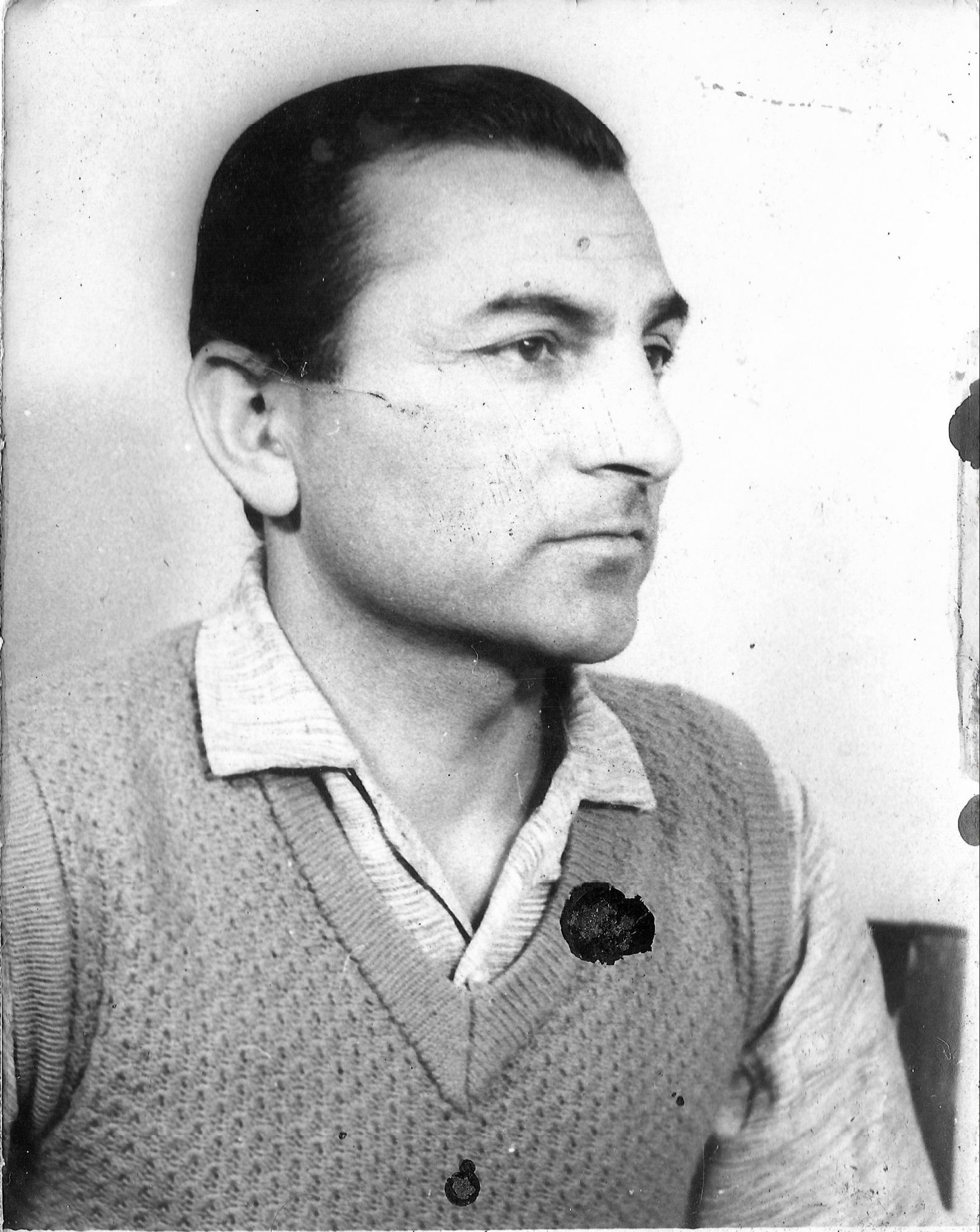

Chief Minister of Himachal Pradesh
- In office 14 February 1980 – 7 April 1983
- Preceded by: Shanta Kumar
- Succeeded by: Virbhadra Singh
- In office 28 January 1977 – 30 April 1977
- Preceded by: Yashwant Singh Parmar
- Succeeded by: President's Rule

Personal details
- Born: 7 July 1929 Simla, Punjab, British India
- Died: 6 July 2002 (aged 72) Shimla, Himachal Pradesh, India
- Party: Indian National Congress
- Occupation: Politician

Thakur Ram Lal (7 July 1929 – 6 July 2002) was an Indian politician and a leader of the Indian National Congress from Himachal Pradesh.

== Political career ==
=== Himachal Pradesh ===
He was elected to the Himachal Pradesh Vidhan Sabha from the Jubbal-Kotkhai constituency nine times from 1957 to 1982. He briefly served as the Chief Minister of Himachal Pradesh from 28 January 1977 to 30 April 1977. In the 1977 Himachal Pradesh Legislative Assembly election, he withstood the anti-Congress wave in elections conducted after The Emergency to win 60.2 percent of the votes in Jubbal-Kotkhai but saw the Congress reduced to 9 seats from the previous 53. He served as the leader of opposition in the legislative assembly from 29 June 1977 to 13 February 1980.

=== Governor of Andhra Pradesh ===
Ram Lal was appointed the Governor of Andhra Pradesh on 15 August 1983. While Chief Minister N. T. Rama Rao of the Telugu Desam Party was in the United States for surgery, he appointed finance minister N. Bhaskara Rao as the chief minister ostensibly at the behest of the leadership of the Congress party despite Bhaskara Rao having the support of no more than 20% of the legislators. On his return, NTR launched a popular campaign against Ram Lal and the Congress Party leading to President Zail Singh to dismiss Ram Lal on 29 August 1984 and NTR being re-appointed the Chief Minister of Andhra Pradesh.

== Death ==
Thakur Ram Lal died on 6 July 2002 in Shimla following a massive cardiac arrest. He was survived by four daughters, a son and grandson Rohit thakur and a granddaughter Rachna Chauhan , two great-granddaughters and one great-grandson.

His grandson, Rohit Thakur is an MLA from Jubbal-Kotkhai.
