= Kumarsain Assembly constituency =

Defunct Assembly constituency in Himachal Pradesh State, India

Coordinates: 31.32°N 77.45°E

Kumarsain
- Former constituency for the Himachal Pradesh Legislative Assembly

Constituency details
- Country: India
- Region: North India
- State: Himachal Pradesh
- District: Shimla
- Lok Sabha constituency: Simla
- Established: 1952, 1972
- Abolished: 2008
- Total electors: 62,280 (in 2007)
- Reservation: None

Kumarsain Assembly constituency was one of the 68 constituencies until 2008 delimitation in the Himachal Pradesh Legislative Assembly of Himachal Pradesh state in India. It was a segment of Simla Lok Sabha constituency. It included areas of Kumarsain tehsil and Sunni tehsil of Shimla district. Post 2008 delimitation, Kumarsain tehsil became part of Theog Assembly constituency and Sunni tehsil became part of Shimla Rural Assembly constituency.

== Members of the Legislative Assembly ==
Year	Member	Picture	Party
1952	Ram Dayal		Independent
1972	Jai Bihari Lal Khachi		Independent
1977	Bhaskera Nand		Independent
1982	Jai Bihari Lal Khachi		Indian National Congress
1985	Jai Bihari Lal Khachi		Indian National Congress
1990	Bhagat Ram Chauhan		Bharatiya Janata Party
1993	Jai Bihari Lal Khachi		Indian National Congress
1998	Jai Bihari Lal Khachi		Indian National Congress
2003	Vidya Stokes		Indian National Congress
2007	Vidya Stokes		Indian National Congress

== Election results ==
=== Assembly Election 2007 ===
2007 Himachal Pradesh Legislative Assembly election: Kumarsain
Party	Candidate	Votes	%	±%
INC	Vidya Stokes	17,375	40.85%	▼2.21
Independent	Pramod Kumar Sharma	16,125	37.91%	New
BJP	Bhagat Ram Chauhan	7,982	18.77%	▼1.23
BSP	Bala Nand Mehta	571	1.34%	New
LJP	Om Prakash Shrama	474	1.11%	New
Margin of victory		1,250	2.94%	▼7.51
Turnout		42,534	68.29%	▼3.93
Registered electors		62,280		▲10.05
INC hold		Swing	▼2.21	

=== Assembly Election 2003 ===
2003 Himachal Pradesh Legislative Assembly election: Kumarsain
Party	Candidate	Votes	%	±%
INC	Vidya Stokes	17,600	43.06%	▼11.87
Independent	Parmod Kumar Sharma	13,329	32.61%	New
BJP	Sandeep Kumar	8,173	20.00%	▲2.87
HVC	Bhagat Ram Chauhan	1,772	4.34%	New
Margin of victory		4,271	10.45%	▼16.53
Turnout		40,874	72.25%	▲1.12
Registered electors		56,594		▲13.39
INC hold		Swing	▼11.87	

=== Assembly Election 1998 ===
1998 Himachal Pradesh Legislative Assembly election: Kumarsain
Party	Candidate	Votes	%	±%
INC	Jai Bihari Lal Khachi	19,492	54.93%	▼11.37
Independent	Ghanshyam Dass	9,917	27.94%	New
BJP	Sandeep Kumar	6,079	17.13%	▼16.57
Margin of victory		9,575	26.98%	▼5.61
Turnout		35,488	72.19%	▼1.17
Registered electors		49,913		▲10.65
INC hold		Swing		

=== Assembly Election 1993 ===
1993 Himachal Pradesh Legislative Assembly election: Kumarsain
Party	Candidate	Votes	%	±%
INC	Jai Bihari Lal Khachi	21,612	66.30%	▲20.35
BJP	Bhagat Ram Chauhan	10,987	33.70%	▼19.47
Margin of victory		10,625	32.59%	▲25.36
Turnout		32,599	72.63%	▲2.42
Registered electors		45,110		▲4.20
INC gain from BJP		Swing		

=== Assembly Election 1990 ===
1990 Himachal Pradesh Legislative Assembly election: Kumarsain
Party	Candidate	Votes	%	±%
BJP	Bhagat Ram Chauhan	16,078	53.17%	▲13.35
INC	Jai Bihari Lal Khachi	13,892	45.94%	▼13.09
Independent	Jagbandhan Lal	213	0.70%	New
Margin of victory		2,186	7.23%	▼11.98
Turnout		30,238	70.12%	▼0.29
Registered electors		43,290		▲27.88
BJP gain from INC		Swing		

=== Assembly Election 1985 ===
1985 Himachal Pradesh Legislative Assembly election: Kumarsain
Party	Candidate	Votes	%	±%
INC	Jai Bihari Lal Khachi	14,016	59.03%	▲18.88
BJP	Bhagat Ram Chauhan	9,456	39.83%	▲19.41
Independent	Jagbandhan Lal	162	0.68%	New
Margin of victory		4,560	19.21%	▼0.53
Turnout		23,743	70.64%	▼4.87
Registered electors		33,851		▲5.73
INC hold		Swing		

=== Assembly Election 1982 ===
1982 Himachal Pradesh Legislative Assembly election: Kumarsain
Party	Candidate	Votes	%	±%
INC	Jai Bihari Lal Khachi	9,641	40.15%	▲10.71
BJP	Bhagat Ram Chauhan	4,902	20.41%	New
Independent	Dharam Singh Thakur	4,623	19.25%	New
Independent	Bhaskra Nand	2,096	8.73%	New
Independent	Sunder Lal	1,507	6.28%	New
JP	Devinder Chauhan	448	1.87%	▼16.39
Independent	Jagbandhan Lal	241	1.00%	New
Independent	Ishwar Dutt Bali	216	0.90%	New
Independent	Brahama Nand Sharma	211	0.88%	New
LKD	Dhian Singh	128	0.53%	New
Margin of victory		4,739	19.74%	▲12.39
Turnout		24,013	75.65%	▲6.24
Registered electors		32,015		▲12.48
INC gain from Independent		Swing	▲3.37	

=== Assembly Election 1977 ===
1977 Himachal Pradesh Legislative Assembly election: Kumarsain
Party	Candidate	Votes	%	±%
Independent	Bhaskera Nand	7,199	36.78%	New
INC	Jai Bihari Lal Khachi	5,762	29.44%	▼19.74
JP	Sunder Lal	3,574	18.26%	New
Independent	Pratap Singh	2,257	11.53%	New
Independent	Jiwan Ram	644	3.29%	New
Independent	Kishori Lal	137	0.70%	New
Margin of victory		1,437	7.34%	▲6.54
Turnout		19,573	69.42%	▲3.85
Registered electors		28,464		▲25.87
Independent hold		Swing	▼13.20	

=== Assembly Election 1972 ===
1972 Himachal Pradesh Legislative Assembly election: Kumarsain
Party	Candidate	Votes	%	±%
Independent	Jai Bihari Lal Khachi	7,336	49.98%	New
INC	Beli Ram Bhalaik	7,218	49.18%	▲33.03
CPI	Kishori Lal	124	0.84%	New
Margin of victory		118	0.80%	▼6.03
Turnout		14,678	66.55%	▲34.61
Registered electors		22,613		▲40.56
Independent hold		Swing		

=== Assembly Election 1952 ===
1952 Himachal Pradesh Legislative Assembly election: Kumarsain
Party	Candidate	Votes	%	±%
Independent	Ram Dayal	1,513	31.04%	New
SCF	Jianu	1,180	24.21%	New
INC	Gobind Ram	787	16.14%	New
ABJS	Hari Datt	753	15.45%	New
Independent	Jai Bihari Lal Khachi	642	13.17%	New
Margin of victory		333	6.83%	
Turnout		4,875	30.30%	
Registered electors		16,088		
Independent win (new seat)				

== See also ==
- Shimla district
- List of constituencies of Himachal Pradesh Legislative Assembly
- Theog Assembly constituency
- Kumarsain
