= Kuldeep Singh Rathore =

Indian politician

Member of the Himachal Pradesh Legislative Assembly
- Incumbent
- Assumed office 8 December 2022
- Preceded by: Rakesh Singha
- Constituency: Theog

National Spokesperson of All India Congress Committee
- Incumbent
- Assumed office 27 April 2021
- National President: Sonia Gandhi(Interim); Mallikarjun Kharge

President of Himachal Pradesh Congress Committee
- In office 11 January 2019 – 26 April 2022
- National President: Sonia Gandhi
- Preceded by: Sukhvinder Singh Sukhu
- Succeeded by: Pratibha Singh

Personal details
- Born: 29 August 1960 (age 66) Shimla, Himachal Pradesh, India
- Party: Indian National Congress
- Spouse: Tripta Rathore
- Children: one son and one daughter
- Education: Himachal Pradesh University
- Occupation: Politician, advocate

Kuldeep Singh Rathore (born 29 August 1960) is an Indian politician from the Indian National Congress. He is a member of the 14th Himachal Pradesh Legislative Assembly, representing Theog-Kumarsain Assembly constituency of Himachal Pradesh.

He was the president of the Himachal Pradesh Congress Committee from 2019 to 2022.

He was appointed National Spokesperson of All India Congress Committee in 2022.

== Early life ==
Kuldeep Singh Rathore, born on August 29, 1960, in Shimla, Himachal Pradesh, is a distinguished personality known for his contributions as an advocate, horticulturist, and active political figure.

He holds a Master's degree and a Bachelor of Laws from Himachal Pradesh University, Shimla. Kuldeep Singh Rathore is married to Smt. Tripta Rathore, and the couple has one son and one daughter.

== Legal career ==
Kuldeep Singh Rathore's legal acumen has been evident through various roles, including serving as the Additional Standing Counsel for the Government of India from 1992 to 2000. He continued his legal journey as the Senior Standing Counsel for the Government of India from 2004 to 2015. Rathore also held the position of Senior Counsel at the Armed Forces Tribunal from 2011 to 2016 and served as the Special Counsel for Railways. Additionally, he contributed his expertise as the Legal Advisor and Standing Counsel for HPSEBL.

== Political Journey ==
Kuldeep Singh Rathore's political journey is marked by active involvement in student politics and various leadership roles within the Congress party. He held significant positions such as the President of NSUI at Government College Shimla and later at the district and state levels. Rathore served as the General Secretary of NSUI, H.P. Unit, and as the Senior General Secretary of H.P. Youth Congress. His commitment to the legal aspects of the Congress party is evident through his roles as Co-convenor of H.P. Congress Legal Cell and Secretary of HPCC, among others.

His political journey continued with responsibilities such as being the District Returning Officer for Party Elections in District Kangra, Polling Agent for the President of AICC, Party Observer for various constituencies, and serving as a Member of AICC.

Kuldeep Singh Rathore held the crucial position of President of HPCC from 2019 to 2022, and currently, he contributes as the Spokesperson for AICC from 2022 onwards.

== Legislative Role ==
In December 2022, Kuldeep Singh Rathore was elected to the State Legislative Assembly. He has been nominated as a Member of the Estimates and Library, Research & Reference Committees, showcasing his continued commitment to public service.

== Languages known ==
Kuldeep Singh Rathore is proficient in Hindi and English, which contributes to effective communication in his legal, political, and public service roles.
