= Theog Assembly constituency =

Legislative Assembly constituency in Himachal Pradesh State, India

Coordinates: 31.12°N 77.35°E

Theog
- Constituency No. 61 for the Himachal Pradesh Legislative Assembly

Constituency details
- Country: India
- Region: North India
- State: Himachal Pradesh
- District: Shimla
- Lok Sabha constituency: Shimla
- Established: 1951
- Total electors: 86,236
- Reservation: None

Member of Legislative Assembly
- 14th Himachal Pradesh Legislative Assembly
- Incumbent Kuldeep Singh Rathore
- Party: Indian National Congress
- Alliance: Indian National Developmental Inclusive Alliance
- Elected year: 2022

Theog Assembly constituency also known as Theog-Kumarsain Assembly constituency (after 2008 delimitation of assembly constituencies, Kumarsain Assembly constituency was merged with Theog Assembly constituency), is one of the 68 constituencies in the Himachal Pradesh Legislative Assembly of Himachal Pradesh state in India. It is a segment of Shimla Lok Sabha constituency.

== Members of Legislative Assembly ==
- Members of Territorial Council: Pandit Sadh Ram, Indian National Congress in 1957 and Nek Ram Negi, Indian National Congress in 1962.

Year	Member	Picture	Party
1952	Jiwanoo		Kisan Mazdoor Praja Party
1952	Devi Ram		Indian National Congress
1967	Jai Bihari Lal Khachi		Independent politician
1972	Lal Chand Stokes		Indian National Congress
1974★	Vidya Stokes		Indian National Congress
1977	Mehar Singh Chauhan		Janata Party
1982	Vidya Stokes		Indian National Congress
1985	Vidya Stokes		Indian National Congress
1990	Vidya Stokes		Indian National Congress
1993	Rakesh Verma		Bharatiya Janta Party
1998	Vidya Stokes		Indian National Congress
2003	Rakesh Verma		Independent politician
2007	Rakesh Verma		Independent politician
2012	Vidya Stokes		Indian National Congress
2017	Rakesh Singha		Communist Party of India (Marxist)
2022	Kuldeep Singh Rathore		Indian National Congress

★By election

== Election results ==
=== Assembly Election 2022 ===
2022 Himachal Pradesh Legislative Assembly election: Theog
Party	Candidate	Votes	%	±%
INC	Kuldeep Singh Rathore	19,447	29.47	▲13.99
BJP	Ajay Shyam	14,178	21.49	▼17.31
Independent	Indu Varma	13,848	20.99	New
CPI(M)	Rakesh Singha	12,210	18.51	▼23.66
Independent	Vijay Pal Khachi	4,576	6.94	New
Independent	Amit Mehta	581	0.88	New
AAP	Attar Singh Chandel	487	0.74	New
NOTA	Nota	349	0.53	▼0.12
BSP	Jia Lal Sadhak	304	0.46	New
Margin of victory		5,269	7.99	▲4.61
Turnout		65,980	76.51	▲1.67
Registered electors		86,236		▲9.80
INC gain from CPI(M)		Swing	▼12.70	

=== Assembly Election 2017 ===
2017 Himachal Pradesh Legislative Assembly election: Theog
Party	Candidate	Votes	%	±%
CPI(M)	Rakesh Singha	24,791	42.17	▲23.48
BJP	Rakesh Verma	22,808	38.80	▲7.82
INC	Deepak Rathour	9,101	15.48	▼23.20
Independent	Devi Ram Sharma	641	1.09	New
NOTA	None of the Above	383	0.65	New
Independent	Roshan Lal	294	0.50	New
Margin of victory		1,983	3.37	▼4.33
Turnout		58,784	74.85	▼0.12
Registered electors		78,540		▲6.05
CPI(M) gain from INC		Swing	▲3.49	

=== Assembly Election 2012 ===
2012 Himachal Pradesh Legislative Assembly election: Theog
Party	Candidate	Votes	%	±%
INC	Vidya Stokes	21,478	38.69	▲1.91
BJP	Rakesh Verma	17,202	30.98	▲18.82
CPI(M)	Rakesh Singha	10,379	18.69	New
AITC	Pramod Kumar Sharma	4,480	8.07	New
Independent	Ram Lal Sharma	988	1.78	New
Independent	Roshan Lal	497	0.90	New
BSP	Vinay Kumar	362	0.65	▼1.74
Margin of victory		4,276	7.70	▼3.99
Turnout		55,519	74.96	▼2.63
Registered electors		74,060		▲27.15
INC gain from Independent		Swing	▼9.79	

=== Assembly Election 2007 ===
2007 Himachal Pradesh Legislative Assembly election: Theog
Party	Candidate	Votes	%	±%
Independent	Rakesh Verma	21,907	48.47	New
INC	Rajinder Singh	16,623	36.78	▼1.69
BJP	Daulat Ram	5,498	12.16	▲3.44
BSP	Kamla	1,082	2.39	New
Margin of victory		5,284	11.69	▲3.86
Turnout		45,196	77.60	▼2.13
Registered electors		58,246		▲8.20
Independent hold		Swing	▲2.17	

=== Assembly Election 2003 ===
2003 Himachal Pradesh Legislative Assembly election: Theog
Party	Candidate	Votes	%	±%
Independent	Rakesh Verma	19,869	46.30	New
INC	Rajinder Verma	16,510	38.47	▼18.46
BJP	Gian Singh Chandel	3,743	8.72	▼32.41
HVC	Col. Daulat Singh Nagaik	1,446	3.37	▲2.43
LJP	Chandan Jogi	1,348	3.14	New
Margin of victory		3,359	7.83	▼7.96
Turnout		42,916	79.83	▲1.21
Registered electors		53,830		▲9.73
Independent gain from INC		Swing	▼10.63	

=== Assembly Election 1998 ===
1998 Himachal Pradesh Legislative Assembly election: Theog
Party	Candidate	Votes	%	±%
INC	Vidya Stokes	21,926	56.93	▲8.94
BJP	Rakesh Verma	15,844	41.14	▼10.88
Independent	Chandan Jogi	384	1.00	New
HVC	Madhu Shyam	363	0.94	New
Margin of victory		6,082	15.79	▲11.75
Turnout		38,517	79.28	▼3.40
Registered electors		49,058		▲15.56
INC gain from BJP		Swing	▲4.91	

=== Assembly Election 1993 ===
1993 Himachal Pradesh Legislative Assembly election: Theog
Party	Candidate	Votes	%	±%
BJP	Rakesh Verma	18,088	52.02	New
INC	Vidya Stokes	16,684	47.98	▼3.34
Margin of victory		1,404	4.04	▲1.39
Turnout		34,772	82.33	▲5.30
Registered electors		42,452		▲7.10
BJP gain from INC		Swing		

=== Assembly Election 1990 ===
1990 Himachal Pradesh Legislative Assembly election: Theog
Party	Candidate	Votes	%	±%
INC	Vidya Stokes	15,586	51.32	▼5.91
JD	Keshav Ram Kashyap	14,782	48.68	New
Margin of victory		804	2.65	▼11.82
Turnout		30,368	77.03	▼1.07
Registered electors		39,638		▲26.42
INC hold		Swing		

=== Assembly Election 1985 ===
1985 Himachal Pradesh Legislative Assembly election: Theog
Party	Candidate	Votes	%	±%
INC	Vidya Stokes	13,941	57.24	▲2.94
JP	Mehar Singh Chauhan	10,416	42.76	▲8.99
Margin of victory		3,525	14.47	▼6.06
Turnout		24,357	78.22	▼1.16
Registered electors		31,355		▲3.69
INC hold		Swing		

=== Assembly Election 1982 ===
1982 Himachal Pradesh Legislative Assembly election: Theog
Party	Candidate	Votes	%	±%
INC	Vidya Stokes	12,947	54.30	▲23.44
JP	Mehar Singh Chauhan	8,052	33.77	▼35.37
BJP	Durga Singh Verma	2,429	10.19	New
Independent	Devi Ram	238	1.00	New
Independent	Balak Ram Himalvi	177	0.74	New
Margin of victory		4,895	20.53	▼17.75
Turnout		23,843	79.53	▲11.04
Registered electors		30,240		▲8.37
INC gain from JP		Swing	▼14.84	

=== Assembly Election 1977 ===
1977 Himachal Pradesh Legislative Assembly election: Theog
Party	Candidate	Votes	%	±%
JP	Mehar Singh Chauhan	13,081	69.14	New
INC	Vidya Stokes	5,839	30.86	▼19.00
Margin of victory		7,242	38.28	▲18.53
Turnout		18,920	68.36	▲8.98
Registered electors		27,905		▲16.88
JP gain from INC		Swing	▲19.27	

=== Assembly Election 1972 ===
1972 Himachal Pradesh Legislative Assembly election: Theog
Party	Candidate	Votes	%	±%
INC	Lal Chand Stokes	7,003	49.86	▲22.02
Independent	Meher Singh Chauhan	4,230	30.12	New
Independent	Tara Dutt	2,664	18.97	New
INC(O)	Durga Singh Rathore	147	1.05	New
Margin of victory		2,773	19.75	▼18.22
Turnout		14,044	59.75	▼0.47
Registered electors		23,875		▼10.86
INC gain from Independent		Swing	▼15.94	

=== Assembly Election 1967 ===
1967 Himachal Pradesh Legislative Assembly election: Theog
Party	Candidate	Votes	%	±%
Independent	Jai Bihari Lal Khachi	10,451	65.81	New
INC	B. R. Bhalaik	4,422	27.84	▲13.75
ABJS	G. Dass	590	3.72	New
Independent	D. Ram	376	2.37	New
Margin of victory		6,029	37.96	▲36.82
Turnout		15,881	62.20	▲22.69
Registered electors		26,783		▼16.67
Independent gain from INC		Swing	▲51.71	

=== Assembly Election 1952 ===
1952 Himachal Pradesh Legislative Assembly election: Theog
Party	Candidate	Votes	%	±%
INC	Devi Ram	1,658	14.10	New
KMPP	Kamal Chand	1,523	12.95	New
KMPP	Jiwanoo	1,359	11.55	New
Independent	Raghbir Singh	1,299	11.04	New
INC	Miknno Ram	1,257	10.69	New
SCF	Ballo Ram	917	7.80	New
SCF	Nalu Ram	859	7.30	New
Independent	Shyam Singh	798	6.78	New
Independent	Hira Singh	782	6.65	New
Independent	Mohan Lal	543	4.62	New
Independent	Lachhman Dass	452	3.84	New
Margin of victory		135	1.15	
Turnout		11,763	36.60	
Registered electors		32,139		
INC win (new seat)				

== See also ==
- Shimla district
- List of constituencies of Himachal Pradesh Legislative Assembly
- Kumarsain Assembly constituency
- Kumarsain
- Theog
