= Satyananda Stokes =

Indian politician and agriculturalist

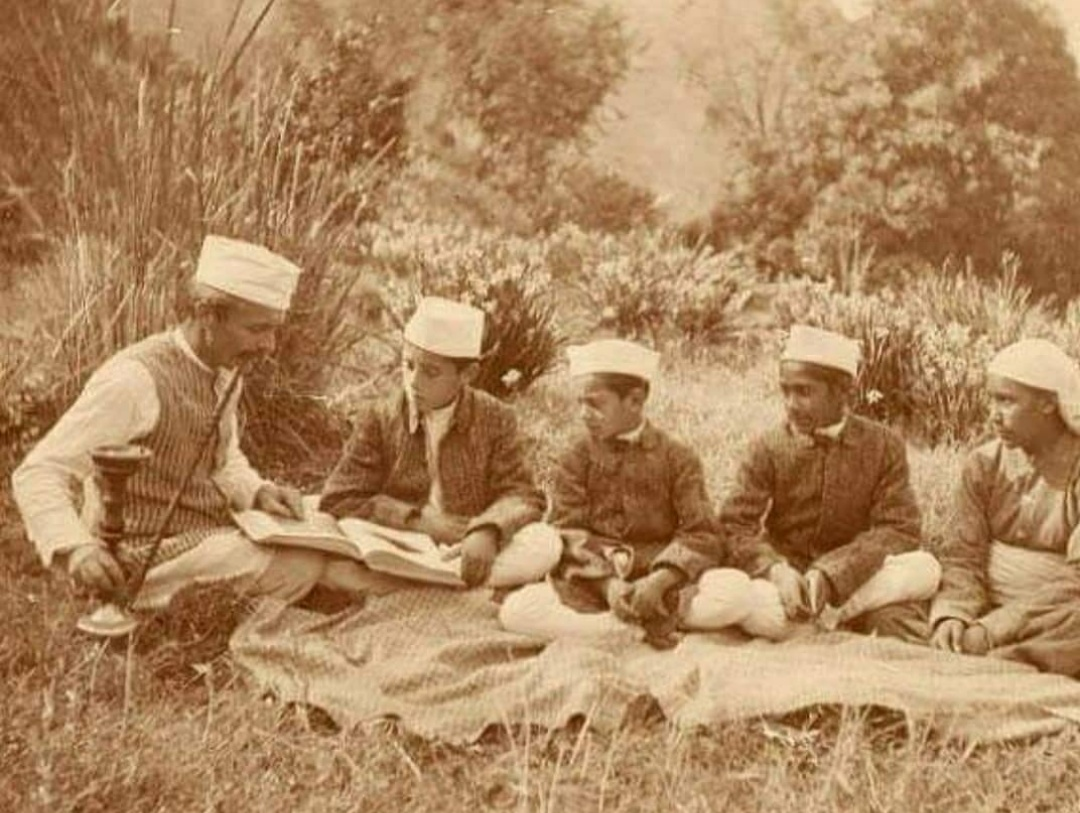
- Stokes with local children
- Born: Samuel Evans Stokes, Jr. 16 August 1882; Philadelphia, Pennsylvania, United States of America
- Died: 14 May 1946 (aged 63); Simla, Punjab Province, British India (present day Shimla, Himachal Pradesh, India)
- Occupation: Orchardist
- Political party: Indian National Congress
- Spouse: Priyadevi Stokes (born Agnes Benjamin)
- Children: 7 (3 sons and 4 daughters)
- Parent(s): Samuel Evans Stokes Sr., Florence Spencer
- Relatives: Vidya Stokes

Satyananda Stokes (born Samuel Evans Stokes, Jr., 16 August 1882 – 14 May 1946) was an American who settled in India and participated in the Indian Independence Movement. He read Satyarth Prakash and met Mr. Rulya Ram Arya. After that he changed his name to Satyanand Arya and after sometimes he used his surname Stokes. He is best remembered today for having introduced apple cultivation to the Indian state of Himachal Pradesh, where apples are today the major horticultural export crop.

== Biography ==
=== Early life ===
Satyananda was born Samuel Evans Stokes, Jr., to an American Quaker family. His father, a businessman, was the founder of the Stokes and Parish Machine Company which was a leading manufacturer of elevators in the USA.

=== Move to India ===
In 1904, aged 22, Samuel traveled to India to work at a leper colony located at Subathu in Shimla. His parents were opposed to this move. Raised a Quaker, Samuel was drawn to the asceticism that is exalted in Indian spirituality and began living a simple, frugal life among the villagers, becoming a Christian Sannyasi.

A few years later, the Archbishop of Canterbury, who was visiting the Viceroy at Simla (the summer capital of the British Raj) heard of the leper colony and was impressed by Samuel's efforts. He encouraged Samuel to form an order of Franciscan Friars, an order of monkhood committed to living in poverty and aiding the diseased and dying. Samuel formed such an order, but his membership in this wandering brotherhood of monks lasted only two years.

In 1912, Samuel married a local girl, gave up his life of poverty, and purchased a chunk of farmland near his wife's village in Kotgarh and settled there. His wife, Agnes, was the daughter of a first-generation Christian. Samuel's father had left a considerable inheritance to Samuel, and the purchasing power of this inheritance was magnified in the remote part of India where he settled. Agnes and Samuel welcomed seven children.

Stokes was a critic of the Christ myth theory. He authored the book The Historical Character of the Gospel published by the Christian Literature Society for India, Madras. It was republished in London as The Gospel According to Jews and Pagans (1913). He argued for the historicity of Jesus and his crucifixion.

=== Apple Farming ===
Samuel applied himself to improving the farmland he had purchased and was able to access scholarly resources unavailable to the other villagers. He identified a new strain of apples developed by the Stark brothers of Louisiana, United States as being suitable to the Simla Hills and began cultivating them on his farm in Kotgarh in 1916. The resulting bumper crops, coupled with Samuel's access to European settlers who ran the export business in Delhi encouraged the other farmers to do as Samuel was doing. Over the next few decades he purchased more land and devoted it to growing apple cultivars which the villagers would use to seed their farms. These efforts invigorated the local economy.

=== Conversion to Hinduism ===
This happy idyll was shattered with the loss of his son Tara to amoebic dysentery. In 1932, Samuel converted to Hinduism, taking the name "Satyananda" while his wife Agnes changed her name to "Priyadevi". Stokes' decision to convert to Hinduism was difficult for his wife Agnes, as it led to estrangement from her family.

=== Indian independence movement ===
Stokes had a strong sense of social justice and later became active in India's freedom struggle for independence from Great Britain. Stokes had the rare honour of being the only American to become a member of the All India Congress Committee (AICC) of the Indian National Congress. Along with Lala Lajpat Rai, he represented Punjab. He was the only non-Indian to sign the Congress manifesto in 1921, calling upon Indians to quit government service. He was jailed for sedition and for promoting hatred against the British government in 1921, becoming the only American to become a political prisoner of Great Britain in the freedom struggle. On Stokes’ arrest, Mahatma Gandhi wrote: "That he (Stokes) should feel with and like an Indian, share his sorrows and throw himself into the struggle, has proved too much for the government. To leave him free to criticise the government was intolerable, so his white skin has proved no protection for him…"

Samuel died on 14 May 1946 after an extended illness shortly before Indian independence.

== Works ==
- Arjun: The Life-Story of an Indian Boy. (as Samuel Evans Stokes). Westminster, 1910.
- The Gospel According to Jews and Pagans: The Historical Character of the Gospel Established from Non-Christian Sources. (as Samuel Evans Stokes). Longmans, Green, 1913.
- The Failure of European Civilisation as a World Culture. (as Samuel Evans Stokes). Pub. S. Ganesan & Co., 1921
- National Self-realisation and Other Essays. (as Samuel Evans Stokes) Rubicon Pub. House. 1977
- Satyakama: Man Of True Desire. Indian Publishers Distributors, 1998. ISBN 81-7341-070-4.
