= Kumarsain =

Town in Himachal Pradesh, India

- Town
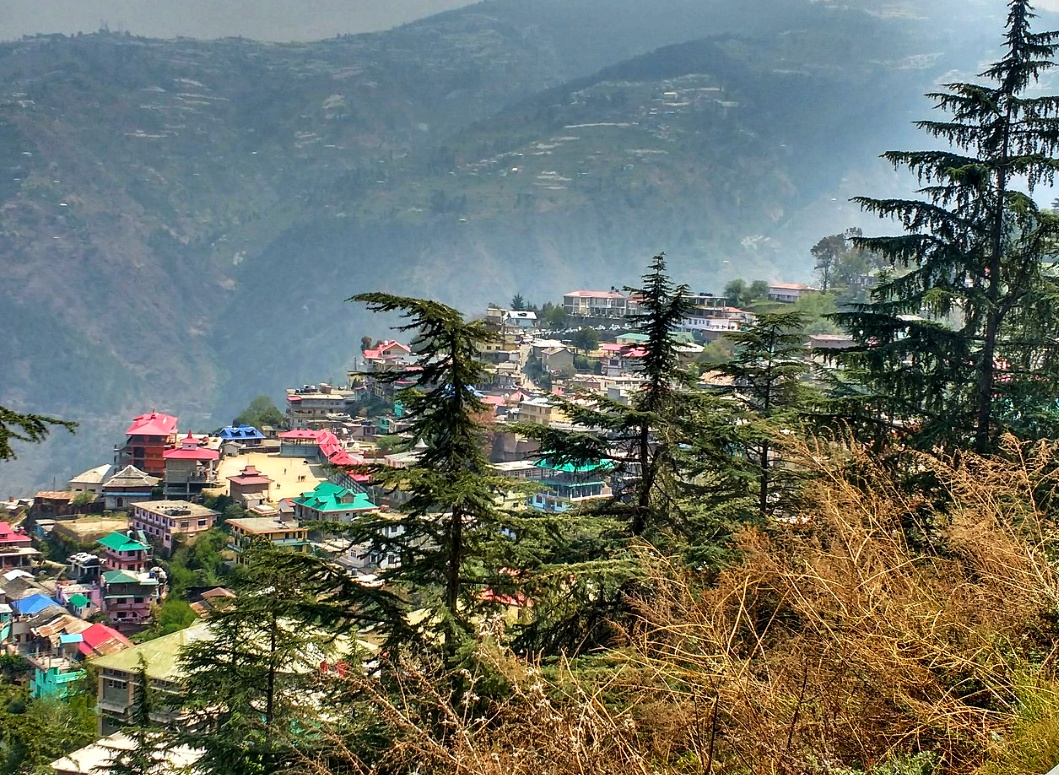
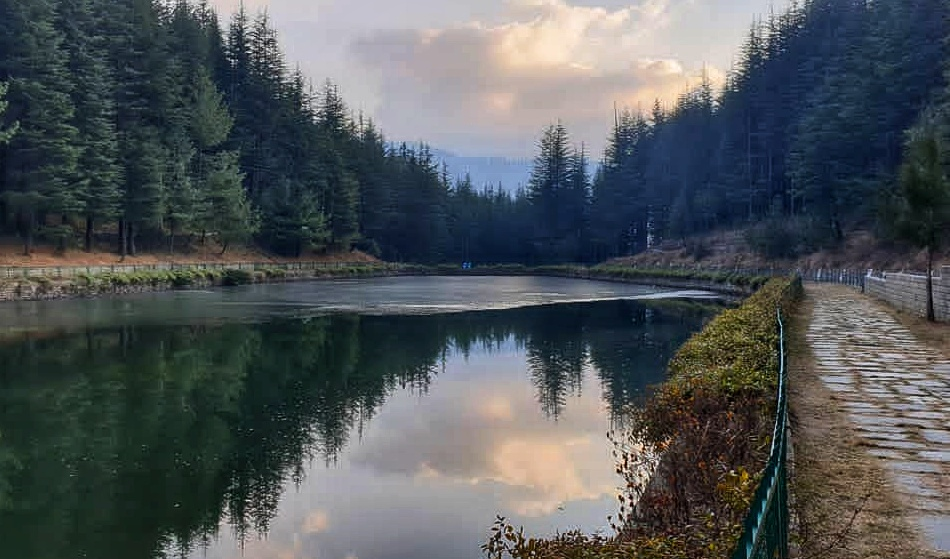
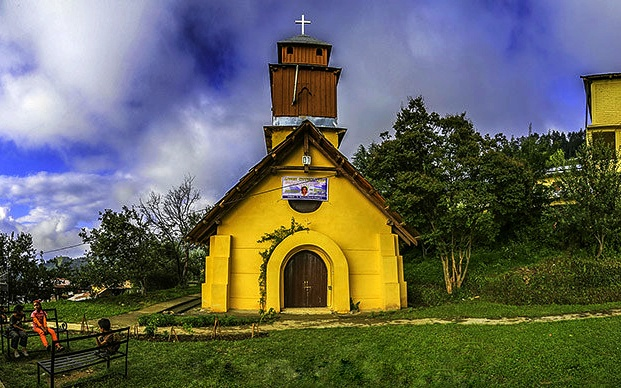
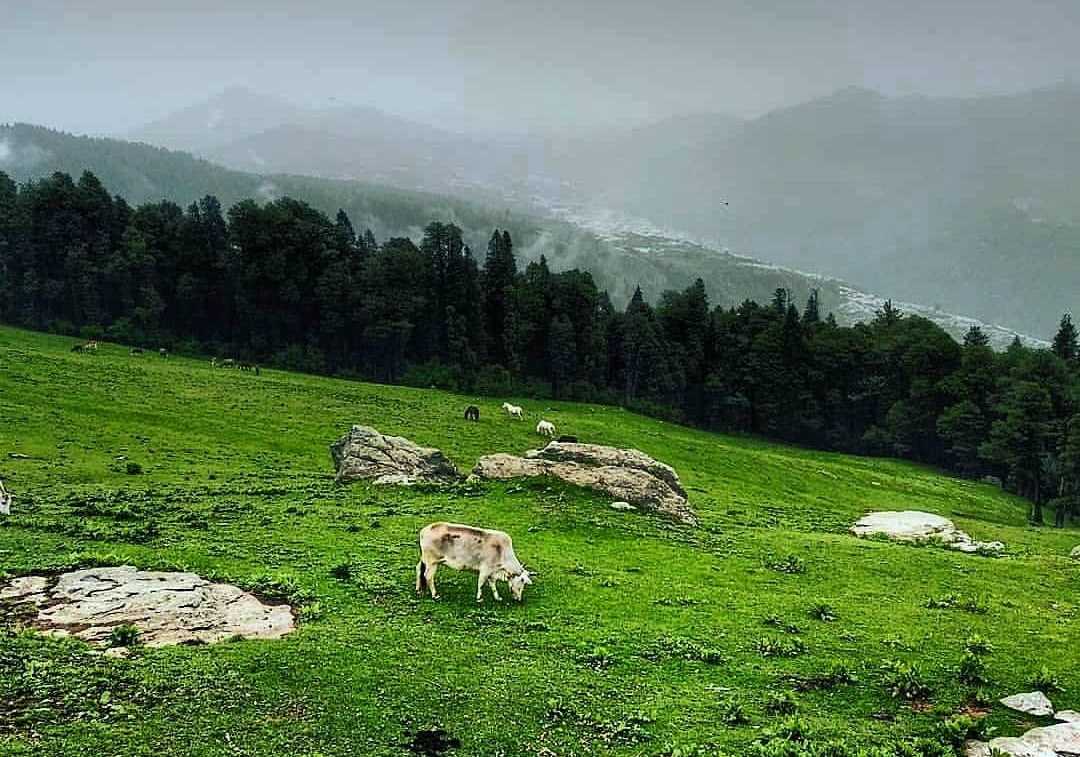
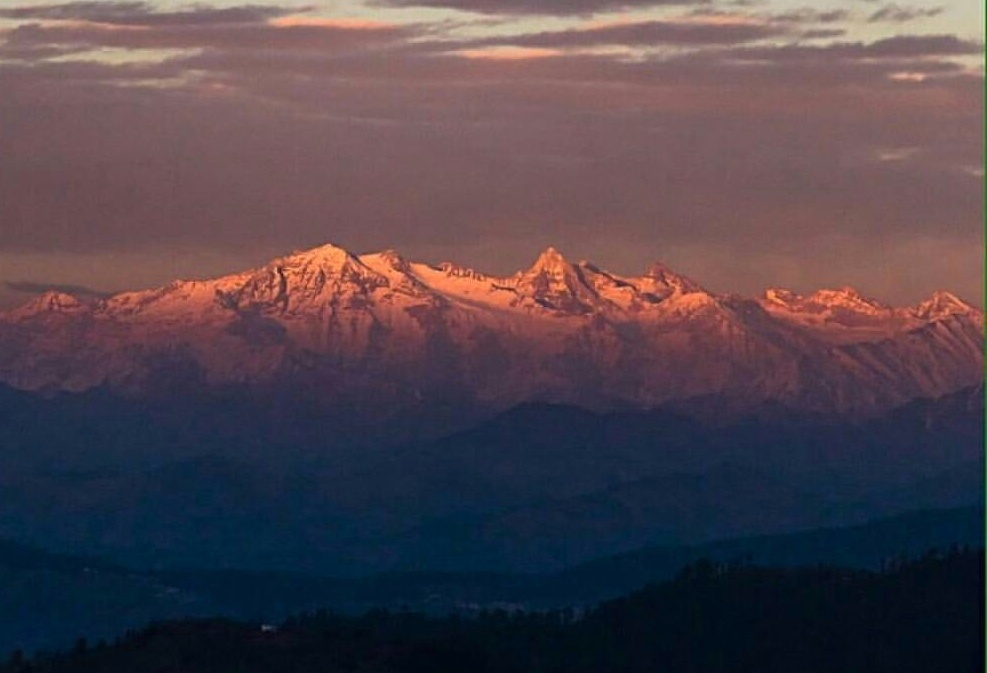
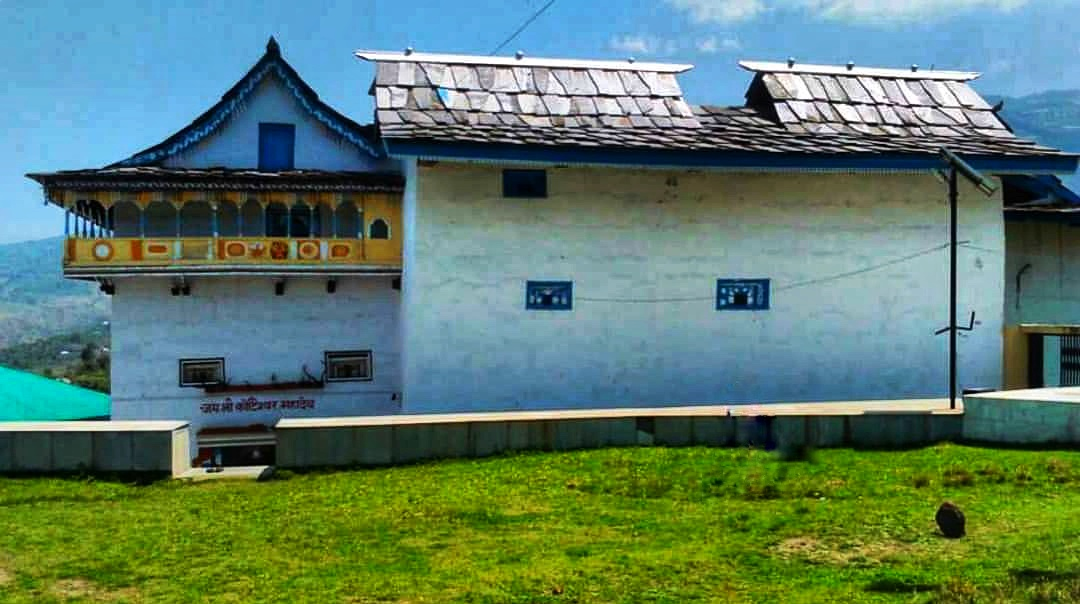
- Clockwise from top: View of Kumarsain town from a nearby village, St. Mary's Church at Kotgarh village, View of Dhauladhar mountain range from Kumarsain, Koteshwar Mahadev Temple at Mandholi village, A meadow on the way to Derthu Mata Temple, Tani Jubbar Lake

- Location in Himachal Pradesh, India Kumarsain (India)
- Coordinates: 31.318145°N 77.446189°E
- Country: India
- State: Himachal Pradesh
- District: Shimla
- Elevation: 1,762 m (5,781 ft)

Population (2011)
  - Total: 5,461
  - Density: 2,711/km^{2} (7,020/sq mi)

Languages
  - Official: Hindi
  - Regional: Mahasu Pahari (Shodochi)
- Time zone: UTC+5:30 (IST)
- PIN: 172029
- Vehicle registration: HP-95

Kumarsain (English: /kumærsæɪn/; Hindi: [kʊmaɾsain]), also known as Kumharsain, is a town in Shimla District in the Indian state of Himachal Pradesh. Formerly under the British Raj, it was the capital of princely state of Kumharsain, which was one of the several states of the Punjab States Agency. It is about 80 km from Shimla and famous for apple and cherry orchards. It is the first place in shimla district where apples were firstly grown in the kotgarh village of tehsil kumarsain.

Kumarsain was founded in the 11th century A.D. as the capital of Kumharsain State. It was occupied by Nepal from 1803 to 1816, and by British India from 1839 to 1840. Kumarsain lies 1 km beside National Highway 5 from Bharara village, which is 20 km from Narkanda towards Rampur Bushahr.

== Geography ==
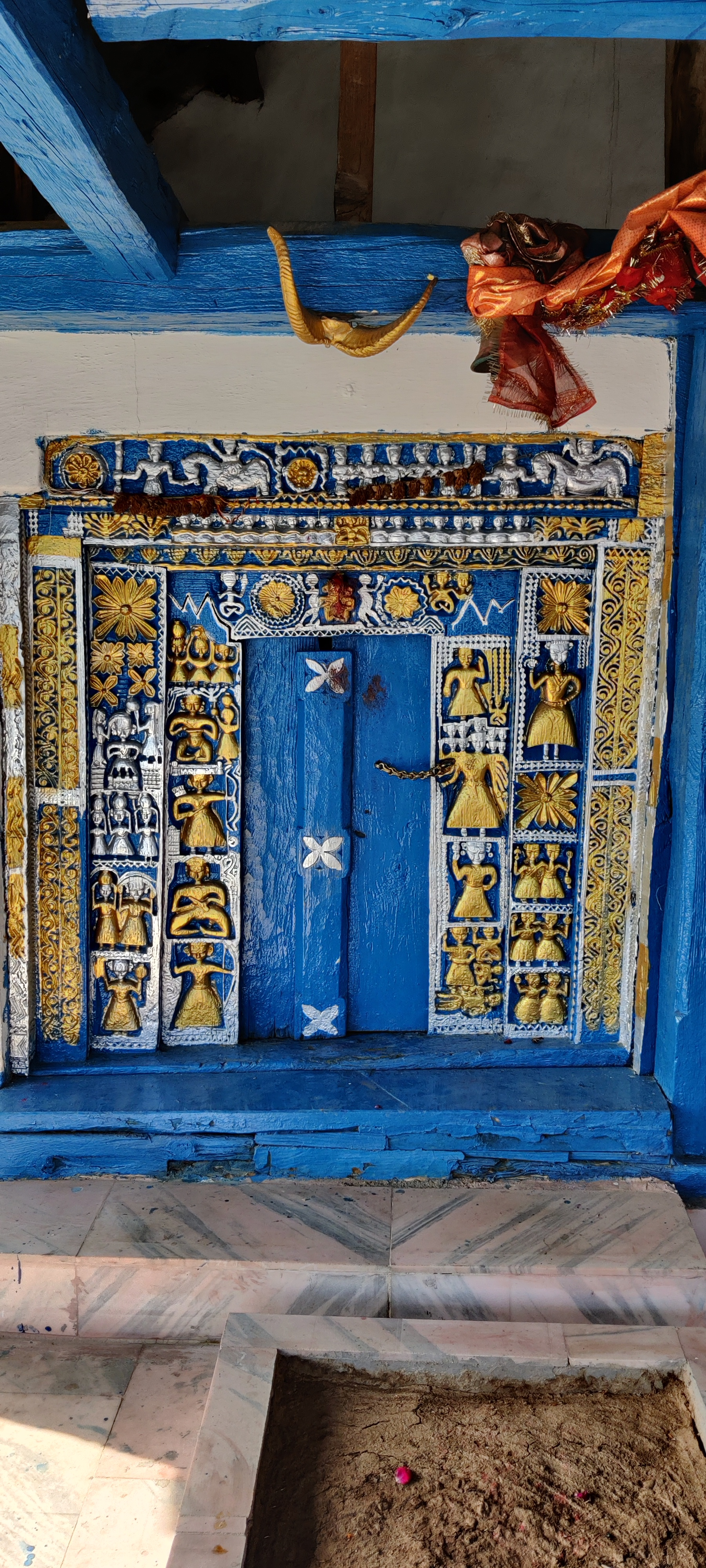
Jogini Temple, Mandholi, Kumarsain

Kumarsain is located at 31.318145°N 77.446189°E and has an average elevation of 1,675 metres (5,495 ft). It is situated above the Satluj river in the North-West Himalayas, about 80 km from Shimla towards interior ranges. Kumarsain has many villages within its boundary namely Mateyog, Damali, Lathi, Bharara, Bai and Dethal.

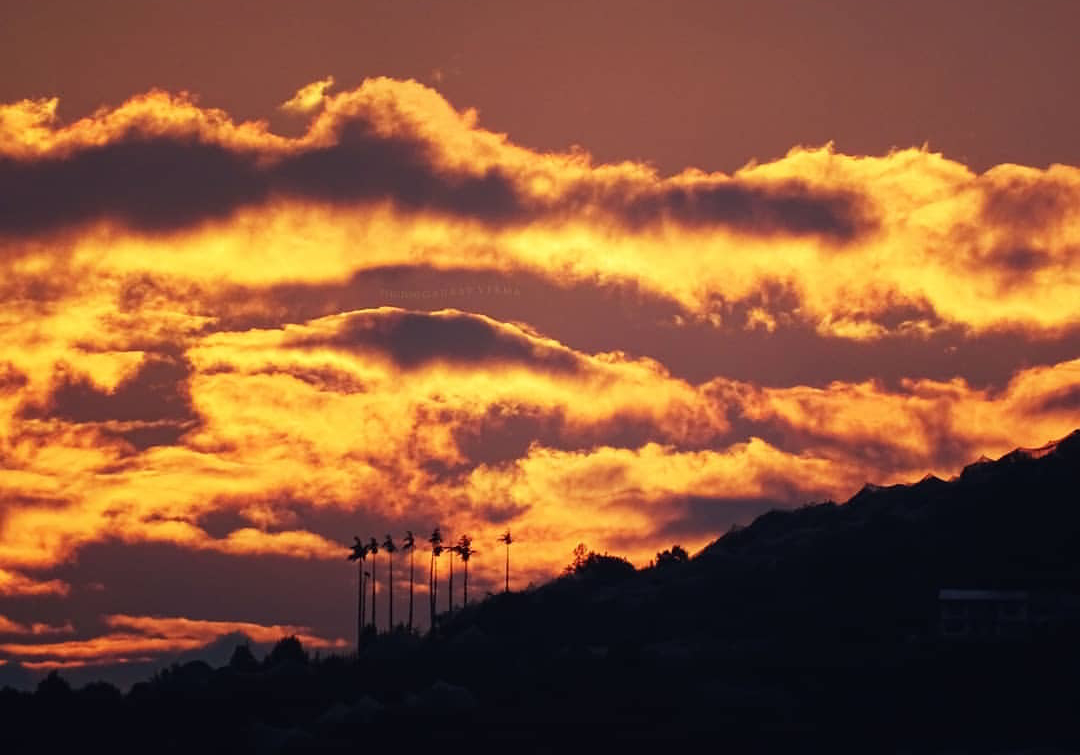
Scenic view after sunset as seen from Kumarsain

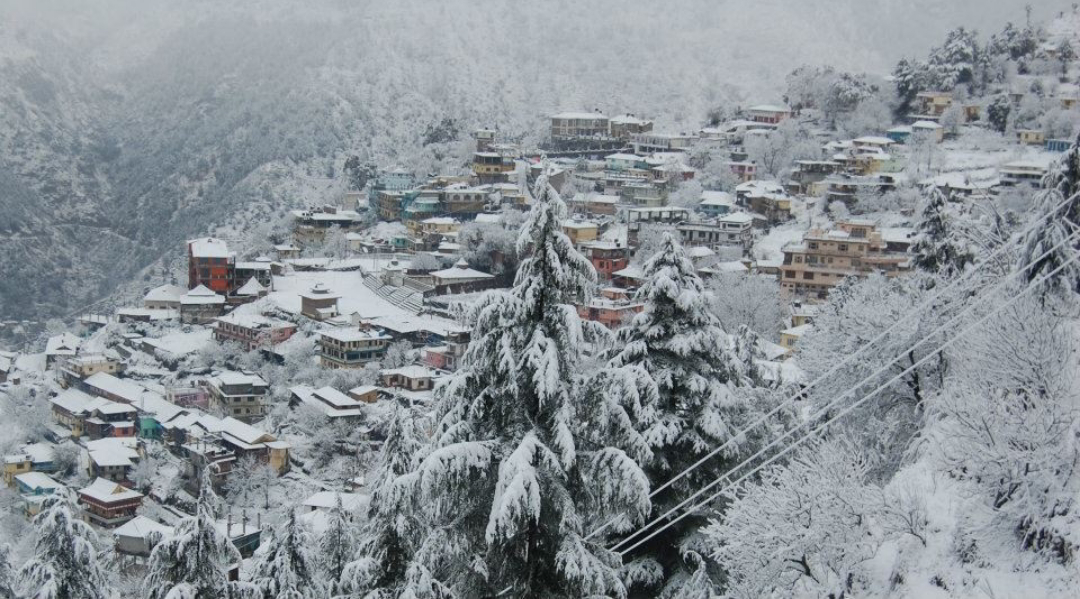
Kumarsain during Snowfall

Tourist attractions around Kumarsain include Narkanda, Kotgarh-Thanedhar, Hatu Peak, Tani Jubbar Lake, Derthu Mata Temple

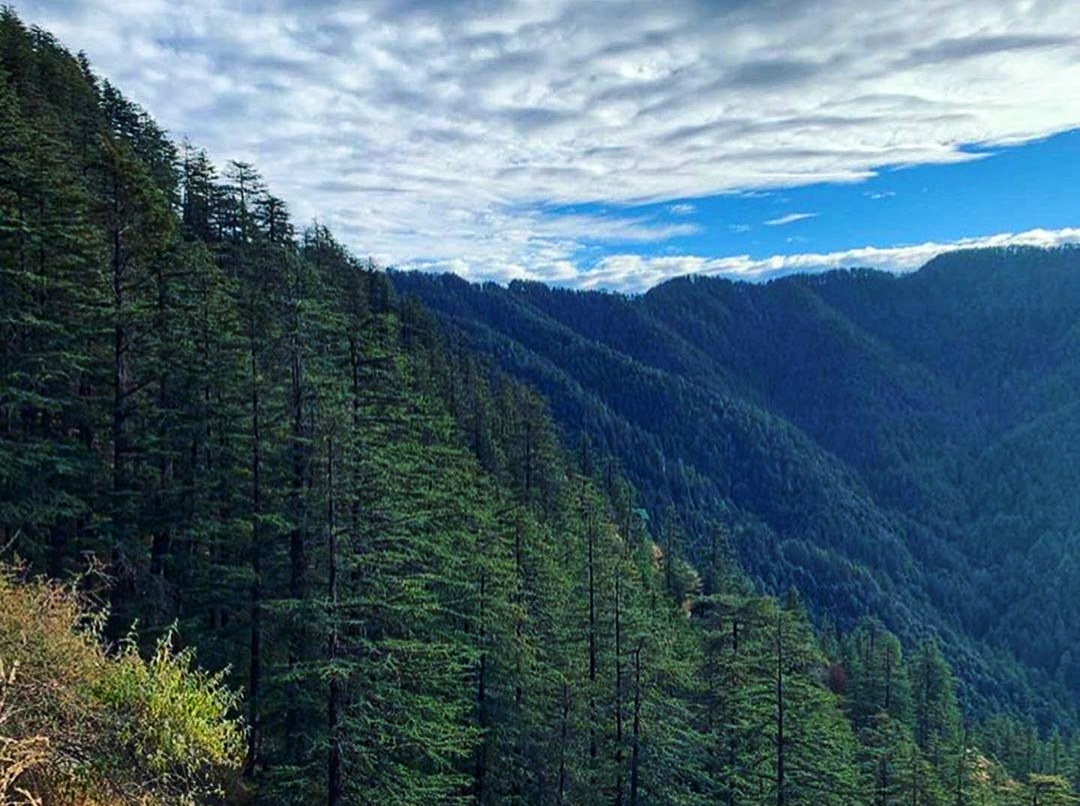
Himalayan cedar forest around Kumarsain

== Government ==
Kumarsain was a Constituency of Himachal Pradesh Legislative Assembly and had a separate election seat until 2008 delimitation, when it was merged with Theog Assembly constituency. Veteran Congress Minister Vidya Stokes was elected 2 times as MLA in 2003 and 2007 from Kumarsain Assembly Constituency. Kumarsain is a tehsil as well as a sub-division and comes under Narkanda Block.

== Demographics ==
As of 2011 India census, Kumarsain had a population of 5,461. Males constitute 52% of the population and females 48%. Kumarsain has an average literacy rate of 97.8%, much higher than the national average of 74.04% male literacy is 97%, and female literacy is 89%. In Kumarsain 11% of the population is under 6 years of age.

== History ==
Kirat Singh, also known as Kirti Singh (later Rana Kirat Chand), who was an office holder and Jagirdar at the court of Raja Narayan Pal of Gaya in Bihar, founded Kumharsain State in the 11th century AD. He along with his two brothers (Kartar Singh and Prithvi Singh) was driven away from Gaya, by the fear of Mahmud Ghaznavi and settled around Kumharsain. They conquered the country from a local chief named Bhambu Rai of Delath. Later on Kirat Singh gave a tract called Karangla to his brother Kartar Singh. Descendants of Kartar Singh founded the states of Khaneti and Kotkhai. The younger brother, Prithvi Singh, established his independent state at Delath. Since the 15th century, Kumharsain was a feudatory of Bushahr State, but was declared independent from it, instead falling under British suzerainty, by a sanad dated 7 February 1816, but at the same time it lost its own tributary states of Bharauli, Balsan and Madhan. By 1892, the Rana maintained a military force of 45 infantrymen and 1 gun. Kumharsain State was ranked 6th in Order of precedence in the Shimla Hill States and 11th amongst the Punjab Hill States.

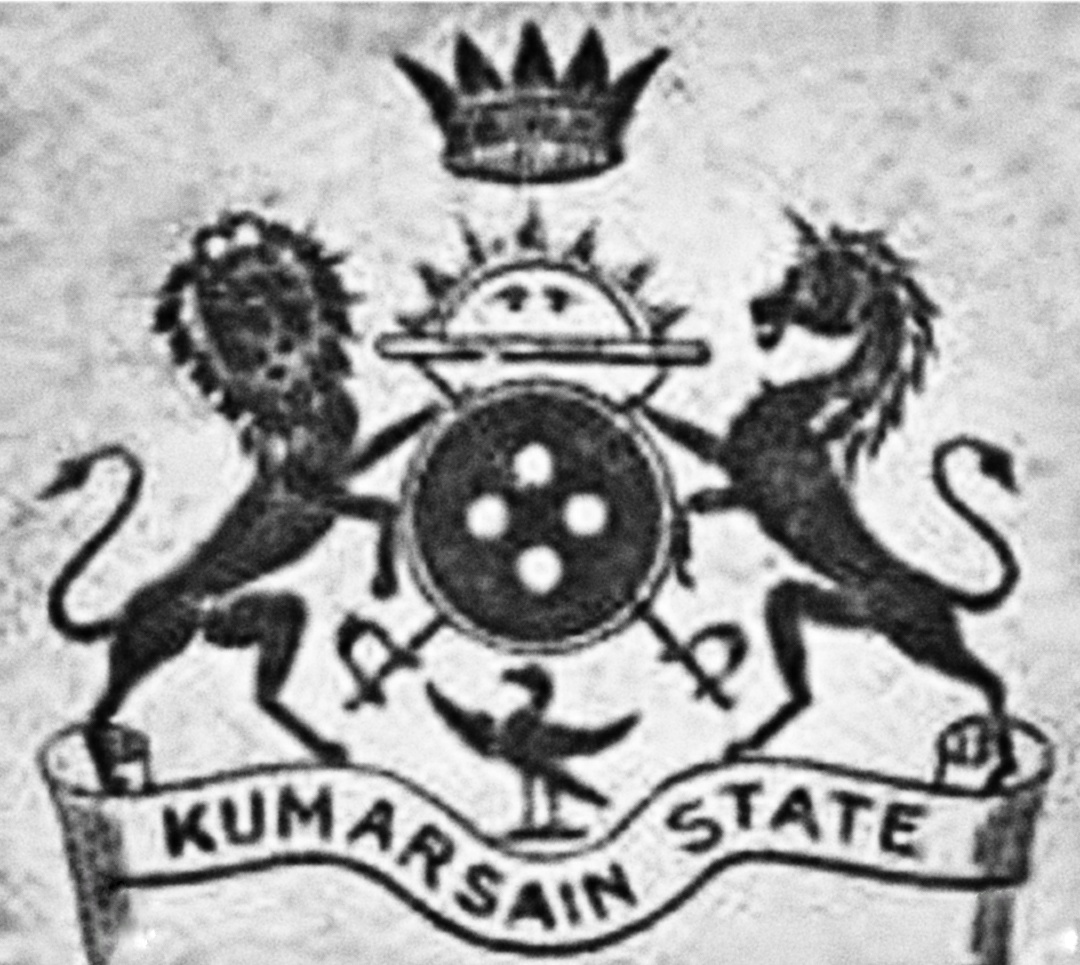
Kumarsain State Symbol

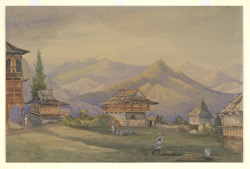
Watercolour painting of Rana's house at Kumharsain by Baden Henry Powell, c.1872

Kumarsain's famous Hira Mahal (named after the 56th Rana of Kumharsain, "Hira Singh"), which served as the home to the Ranas of this princely state, was burnt because of an accidental fire that took place in the mahal on 25 December 2007.

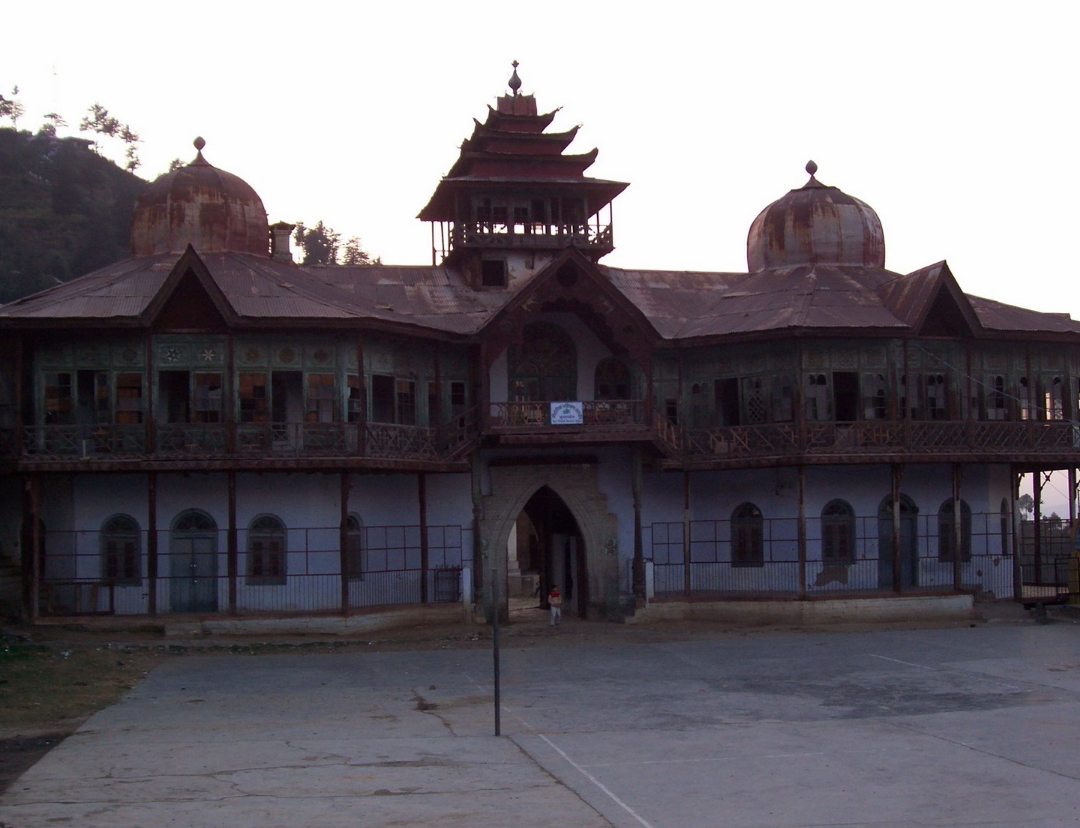
Hira Mahal in 2005 Rajgaddi Bhawan of Kumarsain Royal Household

Also the first American apple tree grown in India was at Kotgarh (a village in Kumharsain tehsil), which was planted by an American immigrant Satyanand Stokes in 1916.
