= Nankhari =

- Tehsil
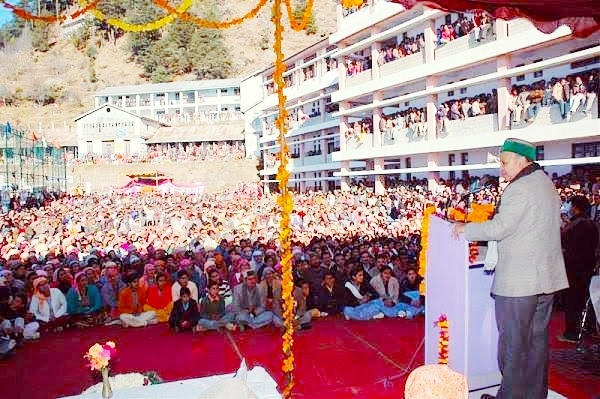
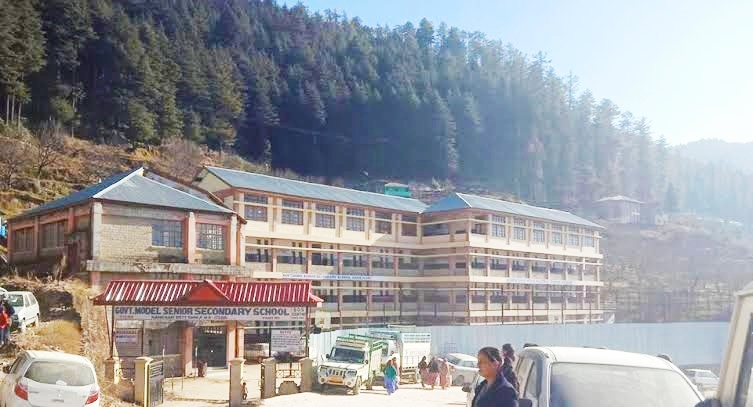
- Nankhari-Then CM Virbhadra Singh's address in G.S.S.S., Nankhari Nankhari-Image of Govt. Model Sr. Sec. School, Nankhari

- Location in Himachal Pradesh, India Nankhari (India)
- Coordinates: 31°18′16″N 77°35′21″E
- Country: India
- State: Himachal Pradesh
- District: Shimla

Area
  - Total: 157 km^{2} (61 sq mi)
- Elevation: 2,400 m (7,900 ft)

Population (2011)
  - Total: 26,238
  - Density: 167/km^{2} (430/sq mi)

Languages
  - Official: Hindi
  - Regional: Mahasu Pahari (Shodochi)
- Time zone: UTC+5:30 (IST)
- PIN: 172021
- Vehicle registration: HP-06, HP-92

Nankhari is a Tehsil (town) and a block in Shimla district in the Indian state of Himachal Pradesh. It is about 92.5 km from Shimla and 33 km from Narkanda and NH 5. It consists of 17 Gram panchayat and 102 villages.

== Geography ==
Nankhari is in a mountainous area. It is also a tourist area. The location co-ordinates of Nankhari are 31°18′16″N 77°35′21″E. The elevation of Nankhari is 2450 m. Nankhari is 33 km far away from Narkanda. It is 92.3 km away from Shimla.

== Climate ==
The average temperature of the year is 15 °C, with variations from changes in elevation.

== Transport ==
There is also a helipad in Tharudhaar. It is 20 km far away from Narkanda's NH 5. It is 92.3 km far away from Shimla. It is distanced 66 km from Rampur Bushahr.
