= Narinder Bragta =

Indian politician (1952–2021)

Personal details
- Born: 15 September 1952 India
- Died: 5 June 2021 (aged 68) Postgraduate Institute of Medical Education and Research, Chandigarh, India

Narinder Bragta (15 September 1952 – 5 June 2021) was an Indian politician.

He served as a Member of the Himachal Pradesh Legislative Assembly for Jubbal-Kotkhai from 2017 till his death in June 2021 from COVID-19 during the COVID-19 pandemic in India. Bragta previously served from 2007 till 2012.
