= Suresh Bhardwaj (politician) =

Indian politician

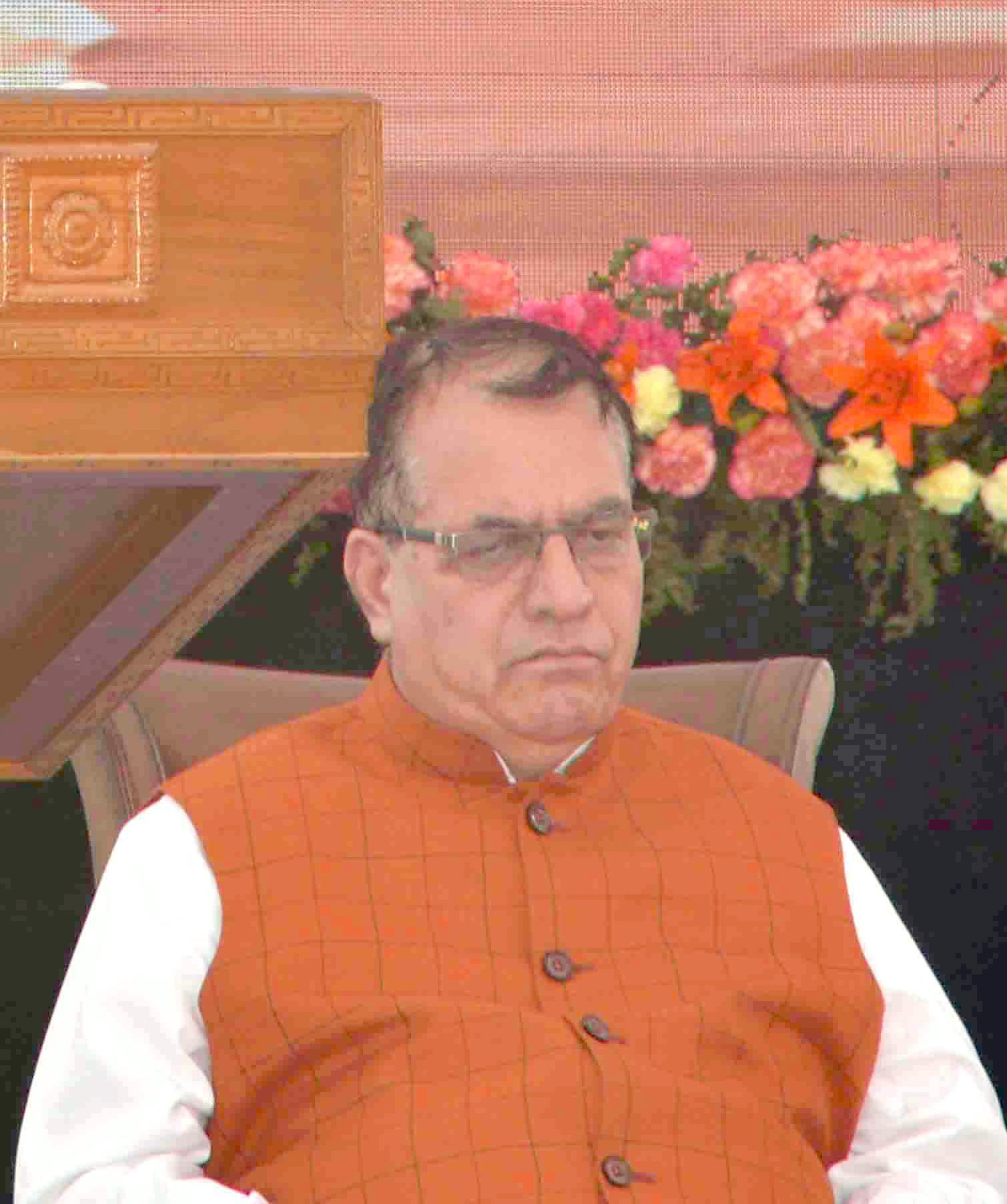

Cabinet Minister, Government of Himachal Pradesh
- In office 27 December 2017 – 8 December 2022.
- Governor: Acharya Devvrat; Kalraj Mishra; Bandaru Dattatreya; Rajendra Arlekar
- Cabinet: Jai Ram Thakur ministry
- Chief Minister: Jai Ram Thakur
- Ministry and Departments: Law & Legal Remembrancer; Education; Parliamentary Affairs; Urban Development; Cooperation

President, Bharatiya Janata Party, Himachal Pradesh
- In office 2003–2007
- Preceded by: Jai Krishan Sharma
- Succeeded by: Jai Ram Thakur

Member of the Himachal Pradesh Legislative Assembly
- In office 31 December 2007 – 8 December 2022
- Preceded by: Harbhajan Singh Bhajji
- Succeeded by: Harish Janartha
- Constituency: Shimla
- In office 20 December 1990 – 11 September 1993
- Preceded by: Harbhajan Singh Bhajji
- Succeeded by: Rakesh Singha
- Constituency: Shimla

Personal details
- Born: 15 March 1952 (age 74) Shimla, Himachal Pradesh, India
- Party: BJP
- Education: D.A.V. College, Jalandhar; Himachal Pradesh University
- Website: hpvidhansabha.nic.in/Member/Details/72

Suresh Bhardwaj (born 15 March 1952) is an Indian politician and member of the Bharatiya Janata Party. Bhardwaj was a member of the Himachal Pradesh Legislative Assembly from the Shimla constituency in Shimla district. He was Cabinet Minister for Law and Education in Jairam Thakur led BJP government. He lost from the Kasumpti seat in 2022 vidhansabha elections, defeated by sitting Congress MLA Anirudh Singh.
