= Kotgarh =

- Town
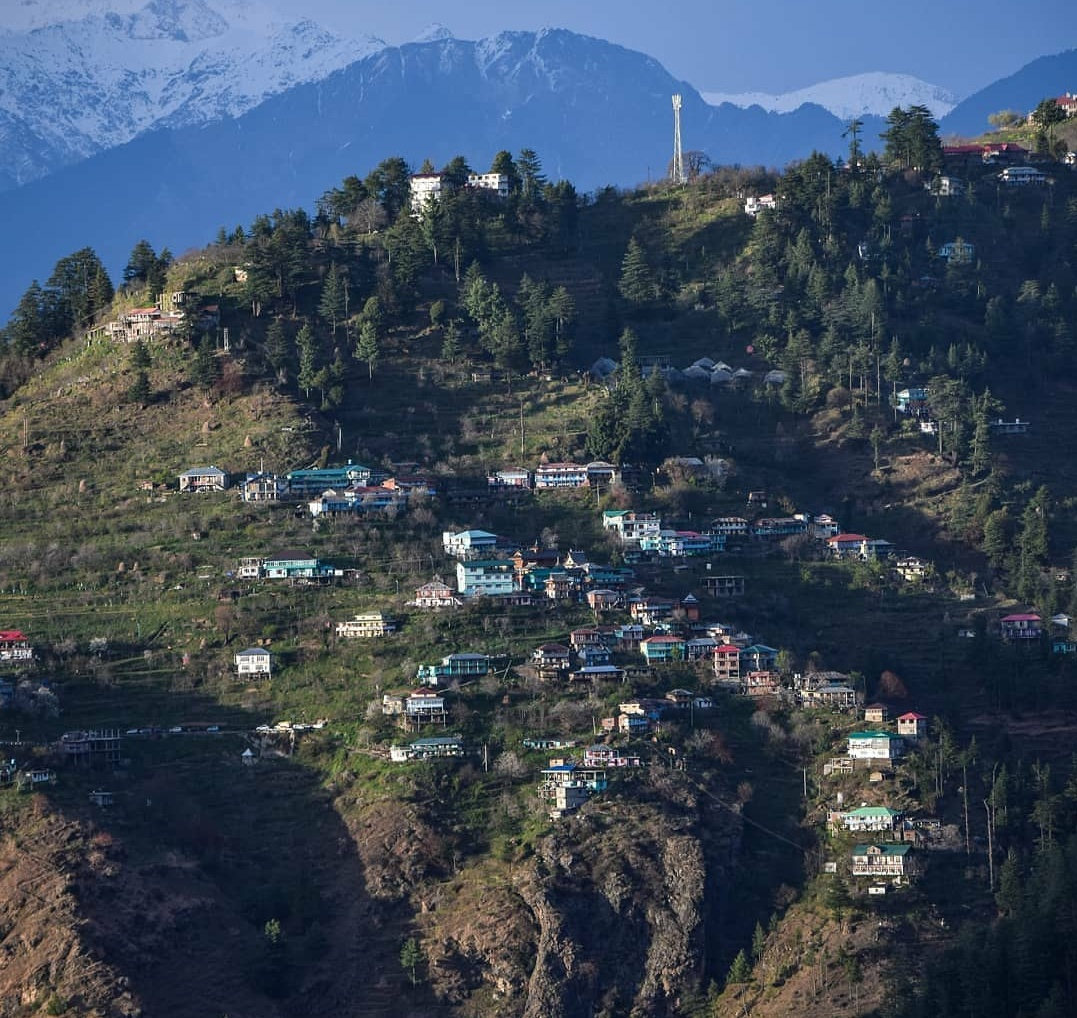
- Kotgarh Village
- Nickname: The Apple Bowl of India
- Location in Himachal Pradesh, India Kotgarh (India)
- Coordinates: 31.31°N 77.47°E
- Country: India
- State: Himachal Pradesh
- District: Shimla
- Tehsil: Kumarsain

Government
  - Type: Panchayati raj
  - Body: Gram panchayat
- Elevation: 1,888 m (6,194 ft)

Population (2011)
  - Total: 608

Languages
  - Official: Hindi
  - Regional: Mahasu Pahari (Shodochi)
- Time zone: UTC+5:30 (IST)
- PIN: 172031
- Vehicle registration: HP-95

Kotgarh is a town and a sub-tehsil in Kumarsain subdivision of Shimla district in the Indian state of Himachal Pradesh. Formerly under the British Raj, it was the capital of Kotkhai-Kotgarh princely state, which was later shifted to Kiari in Kotkhai. Kotgarh was incorporated into British India in 1815 and later to India in 1947.

It was in this region, where Satyanand Stokes planted first American apple tree in India in 1916. Himachal Pradesh is known as the apple bowl as well as fruit bowl of India, due to its high quality of apple and cherry cultivation.

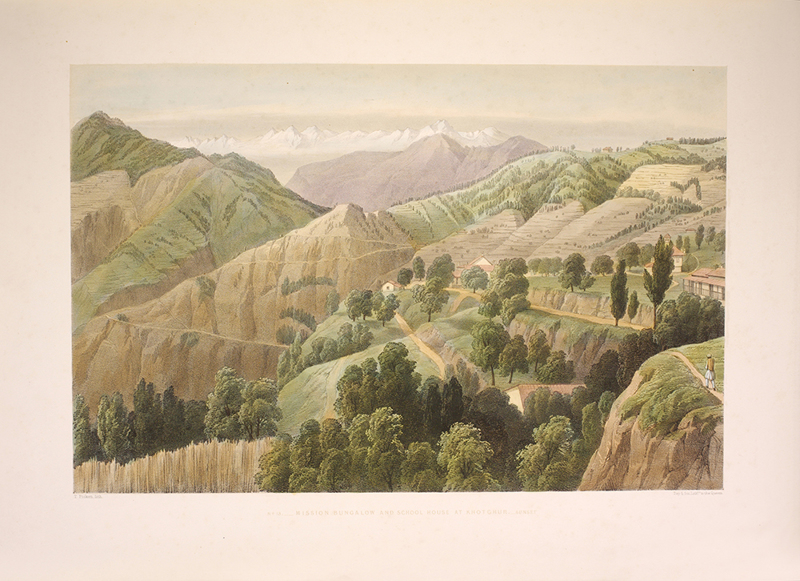
Mission Bungalow and School House at Khotghur in 1850
