= Rakesh Verma =

Indian politician (died 2020)

Rakesh Verma (died May 20, 2020) was an Indian politician and member of the Bharatiya Janata Party. Verma was a member of the Himachal Pradesh Legislative Assembly from the Theog constituency in Shimla district.
