= Kotkhai =

Kotkhai Goer
- Town
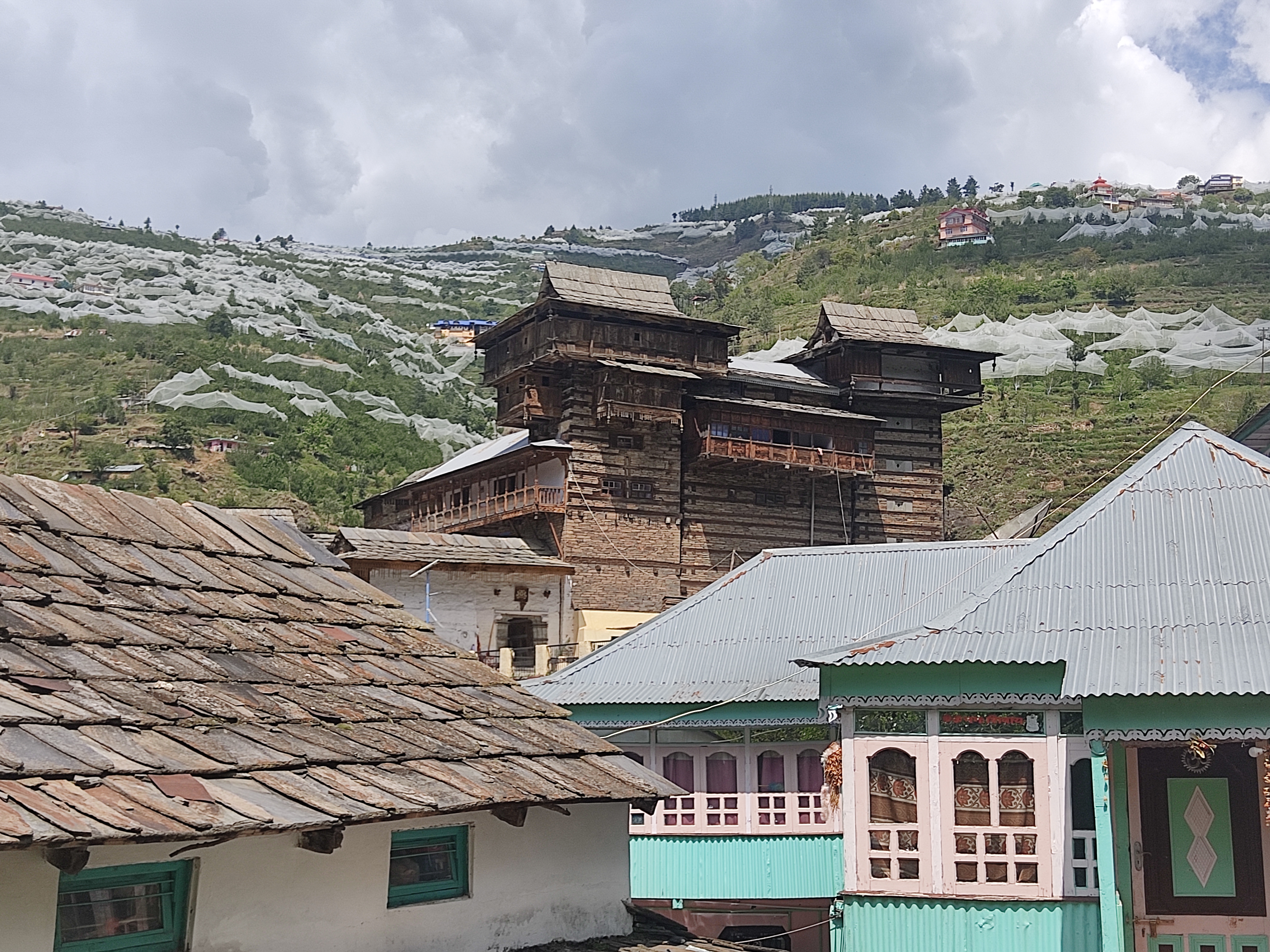
- Deori Khaneti Fort in Kotkhai with view of apple orchards behind

- Location in Himachal Pradesh, India Kotkhai (India)
- Coordinates: 31.12°N 77.53°E
- Country: India
- State: Himachal Pradesh
- District: Shimla
- Elevation: 1,881 m (6,171 ft)

Population (2011)
  - Total: 1,190

Languages
  - Native: Mahasui (Shimla Saraji)
- Time zone: UTC+5:30 (IST)
- PIN: 171202
- Vehicle registration: HP-99

Kotkhai is a town and a Nagar Panchayat in Shimla district in the Indian state of Himachal Pradesh.The name Kotkhai is derived from Hindi language where the name "Kot" means Kings Palace and "Khai" means trench, therefore "Kotkhai" means "Kings palace situated in trench". It is a tehsil with around 40 villages under its administration. The whole tehsil is known for quality apple production. Kotkhai is also known for its fairs and traditional values, people of Kotkhai are really devotional towards Devtas where each villages believes in different forms of Devtas (also known as Dev Bhoomi).

== History ==
Initially Kotkhai was a princely state of the British Raj and was founded around the 12th century AD, by the descendants of Kartar Singh (younger brother of Rana Kirat Singh, "founder of Kumharsain state"). In the beginning, Khaneti, Kotkhai and Kotgarh was jointly ruled by the descendants of Kartar Singh for five generations, until Dooni Singh and Shimal Singh divided the territories into Khaneti and Kotkhai-Kotgarh respectively. Before 19th century AD, Kotkhai was a tributary of Kumharsain State and Princely family of Kotkhai is a junior branch of Princely family of Kumharsain. Kotkhai was incorporated into British India in January 1828 and later to India in 1947.

== Places to visit in Kotkhai ==
Kiala Forest: This forest is a tourist attraction in Kotkhai. The forest is filled with green vegetation and indigenous animals. The peaceful and cool climate environment attracts visitors throughout the year.

Kotkhai Palace: This palace is located in the valley of Kotkhai on hilltop. It was built by King Rana Sahab. Local people popularly call this palace as 'Bussa'. This palace was constructed in a Tibetan architectural style. This palace shows Pagoda style constructions with wooden carvings.

Garawog: It is a tourist spot of Kotkhai valley. It is picnic spot center decorated with apple gardens and lush green pastures. Photographers especially enjoy this site for its panoramic views. The river giri ganga flows there.

HPCA stadium Gumma: The newly made cricket stadium is near the River Giri Ganga which flows by its side.

== Traditional games ==
Thoda is the traditional game of Kotkhai, which the region has been hosting for a number of years. It is a game of Bow and Arrow, which is played between two 'Khoonds' who belongs to the rajput warrior community.

== Geography ==
Kotkhai is located at 31.12°N 75.53°E. It has an average elevation of 1,881 metres (6,171 feet). It is one of the largest apple growing valley in Himachal Pradesh and also a significant contributor to the per capita income of the state.

== Demographics ==
As of 2010 India census, Kotkhai had a population of 4720. Males constitute 58% of the population and females 42%. Kotkhai has an average literacy rate of 84%, higher than the national average of 59.5%: male literacy is 87%, and female literacy is 80%. In Kotkhai, 10% of the population is under 6 years of age. The native language here is Pahari but Hindi and English are also spoken.
