= 2022 Himachal Pradesh Legislative Assembly election =

Indian state legislative election

- 12 November 2022

All 68 seats in the Himachal Pradesh Legislative Assembly 35 seats needed for a majority
- Turnout: 75.78% (▲0.21 pp)
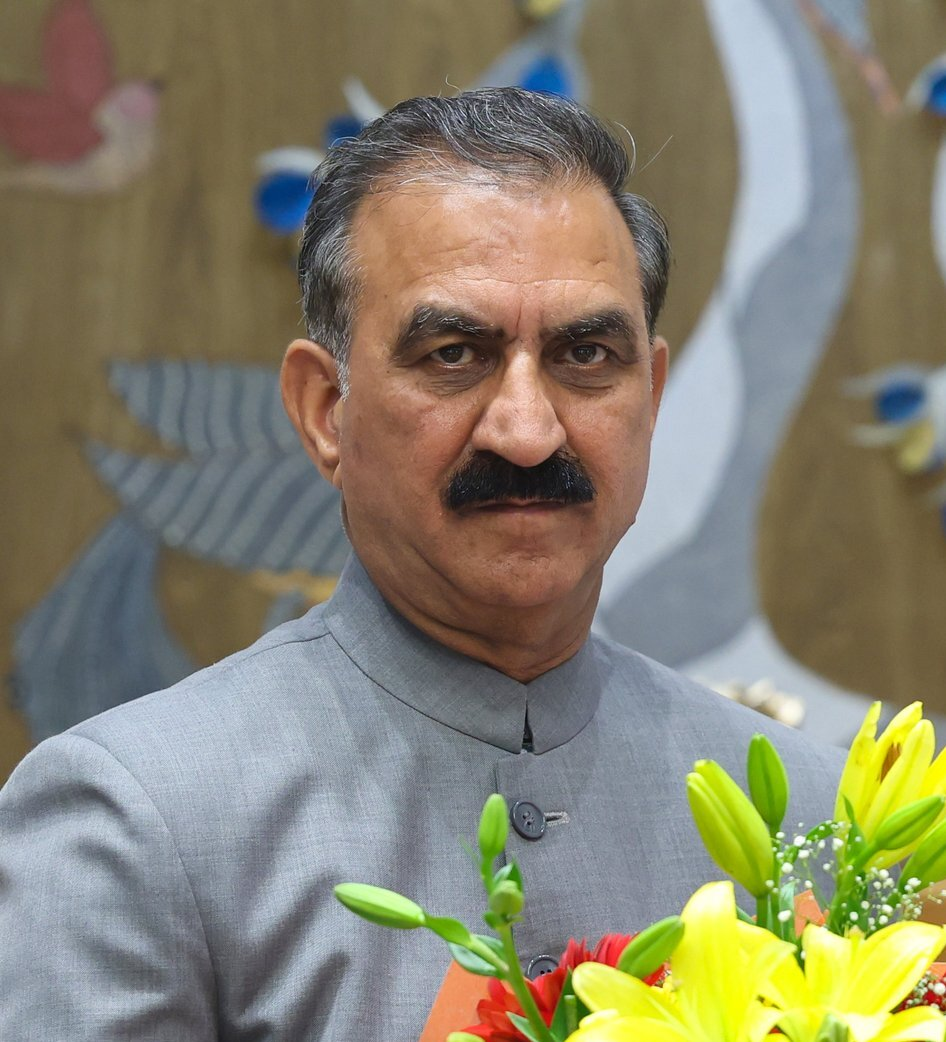

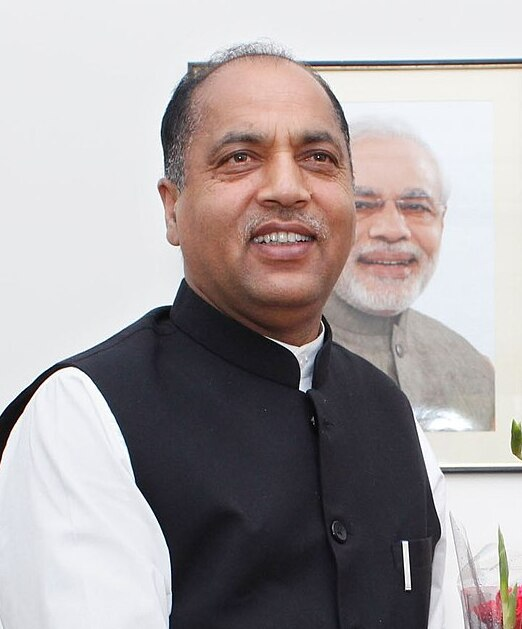
	Majority party	Minority party
Leader	Sukhvinder Singh Sukhu (Note: Congress did not name shuku as chief ministerial candidate he was announced after the election)	Jai Ram Thakur
Party	INC	BJP
Leader since	2022	2017
Leader's seat	Nadaun	Seraj
Last election	41.7%, 21 seats	48.8%, 44 seats
Seats won	40	25
Seat change	▲19	▼19
Popular vote	1,852,504	1,814,530
Percentage	43.90%	43.00%
Swing	▲2.22 pp	▼5.79 pp
- Seatwise Result Map of the election

- Structure of the Himachal Pradesh Legislative Assembly after the election
Chief Minister before election
Jai Ram Thakur
BJP
Elected Chief Minister
Sukhvinder Singh Sukhu
INC

Legislative Assembly elections were held in Himachal Pradesh on 12 November 2022 to elect 68 members of the Himachal Pradesh Legislative Assembly. The votes were counted and the results were declared on 8 December 2022.

The result was a victory for the Indian National Congress, which returned to power after losing their majority in 2017, continuing a pattern of the incumbent party losing reelection in Himachal Pradesh since 1985. Although the popular vote total differed by less than one percentage point, the BJP managed to win only 25 seats.

Sukhvinder Singh Sukhu became the Chief Minister of Himachal Pradesh whereas Mukesh Agnihotri became Deputy Chief Minister of Himachal Pradesh.

== Background ==
The tenure of Himachal Pradesh Legislative Assembly was scheduled to end on 8 January 2023. The previous assembly elections were held in November 2017. After the election, Bharatiya Janata Party formed the state government, with Jai Ram Thakur becoming chief minister. The Indian National Congress became the opposition with Mukesh Agnihotri becoming Leader of Opposition in the Himachal Pradesh Legislative Assembly.

=== Bypolls and defections ===
Since the last assembly elections, several bypolls were held, the most recent of which were won by the Indian National Congress, with it wresting control of the Mandi Lok Sabha constituency and 3 other assembly constituencies.

Congress MLAs Pawan Kumar Kajal and Lakhvinder Singh Rana joined BJP in August 2022. Kajal was the head of Congress Working committee. The defection of the two senior Congress officials was deemed to be a major blow to the party just a few months prior to the Assembly election. On 28 September 2022, Himachal Pradesh state Congress working president and former cabinet minister Harsh Mahajan joined BJP. The defection was another shock to Congress.

== Schedule ==
The election schedule was announced by the Election Commission of India on 14 October 2022.

S.No.	Poll event	Date
1.	Notification date	17 October 2022
2.	Last date for filing Nominations	25 October 2022
3.	Date for scrutiny of nominations	27 October 2022
4.	Last date for withdrawal of candidatures	29 October 2022
5.	Date of poll	12 November 2022
6.	Date of counting	8 December 2022

== Election statistics ==
Registered voters
Male	28,54,945
Female	27,37,845
Third Gender	38
Total	55,92,828

Candidates
Male	388
Female	24
Total	412

Polling stations
Urban areas	646
Rural areas	7,235
Total	7,881

== Parties and alliances ==
=== National Democratic Alliance (India) ===
National Democratic Alliance (India)

No.	Party	Flag	Symbol	Leader	Photo	Seats contested
1.	Bharatiya Janata Party			Jai Ram Thakur		68

=== United Progressive Alliance ===
United Progressive Alliance

No.	Party	Flag	Symbol	Leader	Photo	Seats contested
1.	Indian National Congress			Sukhvinder Singh Sukhu		68

=== Aam Aadmi Party ===
Aam Aadmi Party

No.	Party	Flag	Symbol	Leader	Photo	Seats contested
1.	Aam Aadmi Party			Surjeet Singh Thakur		67

=== Left Front ===
CPI(M) contested the assembly election in alliance with the CPI.

Left Front

No.	Party	Flag	Symbol	Leader	Photo	Seats contested
1.	Communist Party of India (Marxist)			Rakesh Singha		11
2.	Communist Party of India			Shyam Singh Chauhan		1

=== Others ===
No.	Party	Flag	Symbol	Leader	Photo	Seats contested
1.	Bahujan Samaj Party			Narayan Singh Azad		53
2.	Rashtriya Devbhumi Party			Rumit Singh Thakur		29

== Candidates ==
AAP released the first list of 4 candidates on 20 September 2022. Second list of 54 candidates was released on 20 October 2022. Third list of 10 candidates was released on 20 October 2022. AAP's nomination from Darang was withdrawn on 29 October 2022.

CPI(M) released the first list of 11 candidates on 22 September 2022. and second list of 2 candidates on 24 September. However, the earlier lists were withdrawn and a final list of 11 candidates was released on 18 October 2022. It was reported that CPI would contest on 3 seats, but decided to contest on 1 seat only.

Congress released the first list of 46 candidates on 18 October 2022. Second list of 17 candidates was released on 20 October 2022. Congress released third list of 4 candidates on 22 October 2022. Candidate for the remaining 1 seat was named on 25 October 2022.

BJP released the first list of 62 candidates on 19 October 2022. Second list of remaining 6 candidates was released on 20 October 2022. BJP replaced its candidates from Chamba on 20 October 2022 and Kullu on 25 October 2022.

District	Constituency		Electors (2022)	NDA		UPA	
District	No.	Name	Electors (2022)	Party	Candidate	Party	Candidate
Chamba	1	Churah (SC)	75,468	BJP	Hans Raj	INC	Yashwant Singh Khanna
Chamba	2	Bharmour (ST)	76,046	BJP	Janak Raj	INC	Thakur Singh Bharmouri
Chamba	3	Chamba	81,594	BJP	Neelam Nayyar	INC	Neeraj Nayar
Chamba	4	Dalhousie	73,071	BJP	Dhavinder Singh	INC	Asha Kumari
Chamba	5	Bhattiyat	78,980	BJP	Bikram Singh Jaryal	INC	Kuldeep Singh Pathania
Kangra	6	Nurpur	91,269	BJP	Ranbir Singh Nikka	INC	Ajay Mahajan
Kangra	7	Indora (SC)	91,569	BJP	Reeta Dhiman	INC	Malender Rajan
Kangra	8	Fatehpur	87,913	BJP	Rakesh Pathania	INC	Bhawani Singh Pathania
Kangra	9	Jawali	99,572	BJP	Sanjay Kumar Guleria	INC	Chander Kumar
Kangra	10	Dehra	83,629	BJP	Ramesh Dhawala	INC	Rajesh Sharma
Kangra	11	Jaswan-Pragpur	77,991	BJP	Bikram Thakur	INC	Surinder Singh Mankotia
Kangra	12	Jawalamukhi	78,144	BJP	Ravinder Singh Ravi	INC	Sanjay Rattan
Kangra	13	Jaisinghpur (SC)	84,018	BJP	Ravinder Dhiman	INC	Yadvinder Goma
Kangra	14	Sullah	1,03,905	BJP	Vipin Singh Parmar	INC	Jagdish Sapehia
Kangra	15	Nagrota	88,867	BJP	Arun Kumar Mehra	INC	Raghubir Singh Bali
Kangra	16	Kangra	81,583	BJP	Pawan Kumar Kajal	INC	Surender Singh Kaku
Kangra	17	Shahpur	87,723	BJP	Sarveen Choudhary	INC	Kewal Singh Pathania
Kangra	18	Dharamshala	81,516	BJP	Rakesh Choudhary	INC	Sudhir Sharma
Kangra	19	Palampur	75,481	BJP	Trilok Kapoor	INC	Ashish Butail
Kangra	20	Baijnath (SC)	89,135	BJP	Mulkh Raj Premi	INC	Kishori Lal
Lahaul and Spiti	21	Lahaul and Spiti (ST)	24,876	BJP	Ram Lal Markanda	INC	Ravi Thakur
Kullu	22	Manali	73,488	BJP	Govind Singh Thakur	INC	Bhuvneshwar Gaur
Kullu	23	Kullu	89,600	BJP	Narottam Thakur	INC	Sunder Thakur
Kullu	24	Banjar	73,094	BJP	Surender Shourie	INC	Khimi Ram
Kullu	25	Anni (SC)	85,643	BJP	Lokendra Kumar	INC	Bansi Lal Kaushal
Mandi	26	Karsog (SC)	74,909	BJP	Deepraj Kapoor	INC	Mahesh Raj
Mandi	27	Sundernagar	81,164	BJP	Rakesh Jamwal	INC	Sohan Lal Thakur
Mandi	28	Nachan (SC)	86,208	BJP	Vinod Kumar	INC	Naresh Kumar
Mandi	29	Seraj	81,843	BJP	Jai Ram Thakur	INC	Chetram Thakur
Mandi	30	Darang	89,086	BJP	Puranchand Thakur	INC	Kaul Singh Thakur
Mandi	31	Jogindernagar	98,341	BJP	Prakash Rana	INC	Surender Pal Thakur
Mandi	32	Dharampur	79,958	BJP	Rajat Thakur	INC	Chandershekhar
Mandi	33	Mandi	76,957	BJP	Anil Sharma	INC	Champa Thakur
Mandi	34	Balh (SC)	79,587	BJP	Inder Singh Gandhi	INC	Prakash Chaudhary
Mandi	35	Sarkaghat	90,837	BJP	Daleep Thakur	INC	Pawan Kumar
Hamirpur	36	Bhoranj (SC)	81,134	BJP	Anil Dhiman	INC	Suresh Kumar
Hamirpur	37	Sujanpur	73,922	BJP	Ranjeet Singh	INC	Rajinder Singh Rana
Hamirpur	38	Hamirpur	74,861	BJP	Narinder Thakur	INC	Pushpendra Verma
Hamirpur	39	Barsar	86,273	BJP	Maya Sharma	INC	Inder Dutt Lakhanpal
Hamirpur	40	Nadaun	93,107	BJP	Vijay Agnihotri	INC	Sukhvinder Singh Sukhu
Una	41	Chintpurni (SC)	82,686	BJP	Balbir Singh	INC	Sudarshan Singh Babloo
Una	42	Gagret	82,774	BJP	Rakesh Thakur	INC	Chaitanya Sharma
Una	43	Haroli	86,273	BJP	Ramkumar	INC	Mukesh Agnihotri
Una	44	Una	85,254	BJP	Satpal Singh Satti	INC	Satpal Raizada
Una	45	Kutlehar	85,163	BJP	Virender Kanwar	INC	Davinder Kumar Bhutto
Bilaspur	46	Jhanduta (SC)	79,577	BJP	Jeet Ram Katwal	INC	Vivek Kumar
Bilaspur	47	Ghumarwin	88,527	BJP	Rajinder Garg	INC	Rajesh Dharmani
Bilaspur	48	Bilaspur	83,025	BJP	Trilok Jamwal	INC	Bumber Thakur
Bilaspur	49	Sri Naina Deviji	74,244	BJP	Randhir Sharma	INC	Ram Lal Thakur
Solan	50	Arki	93,852	BJP	Govind Ram Sharma	INC	Sanjay Awasthy
Solan	51	Nalagarh	89,828	BJP	Lakhvinder Singh Rana	INC	Hardeep Singh Bawa
Solan	52	Doon	68,266	BJP	Paramjeet Singh	INC	Ram Kumar Chaudhary
Solan	53	Solan (SC)	85,238	BJP	Rajesh Kashyap	INC	Dhani Ram Shandil
Solan	54	Kasauli (SC)	67,434	BJP	Rajiv Saizal	INC	Vinod Kumar Sultanpuri
Sirmaur	55	Pachhad (SC)	76,475	BJP	Reena Kashyap	INC	Dayal Pyari
Sirmaur	56	Nahan	83,561	BJP	Rajeev Bindal	INC	Ajay Solanki
Sirmaur	57	Sri Renukaji (SC)	72,961	BJP	Narayan Singh	INC	Vinay Kumar
Sirmaur	58	Paonta Sahib	82,487	BJP	Sukh Ram Chaudhary	INC	Kirnesh Jung
Sirmaur	59	Shillai	74,831	BJP	Baldev Singh Tomar	INC	Harshwardhan Chauhan
Shimla	60	Chopal	79,109	BJP	Balbir Singh Verma	INC	Rajneesh Kimta
Shimla	61	Theog	83,275	BJP	Ajay Shyam	INC	Kuldeep Singh Rathore
Shimla	62	Kasumpti	65,713	BJP	Suresh Bhardwaj	INC	Anirudh Singh
Shimla	63	Shimla	48,071	BJP	Sanjay Sood	INC	Harish Janartha
Shimla	64	Shimla Rural	76,267	BJP	Ravi Mehta	INC	Vikramaditya Singh
Shimla	65	Jubbal-Kotkhai	71,566	BJP	Chetan Singh Bragta	INC	Rohit Thakur
Shimla	66	Rampur (SC)	74,838	BJP	Kaul Negi	INC	Nand Lal
Shimla	67	Rohru (SC)	73,580	BJP	Shashi Bala	INC	Mohan Lal Brakta
Kinnaur	68	Kinnaur (ST)	58,836	BJP	Surat Negi	INC	Jagat Singh Negi

== Campaigns ==
=== Aam Aadmi Party ===
On 6 April 2022, AAP held a roadshow in Mandi with Delhi Chief Minister Arvind Kejriwal and Punjab Chief Minister Bhagwant Mann. The chief ministrial candidate was ajay kothial. Surjeet Thakur was appointed as President of the state unit in June 2022.

==== Manifesto ====
AAP promised 300 units of free electricity to every household, if AAP comes to power.

Aam Aadmi Party published its 10 promises as guarantees of jobs for all youth, unemployment allowance, an advisory board for traders, end of "inspector rule", and corruption-free administration.

- Employment: jobs for all youth. AAP promised six lakh government jobs for the youth. AAP will bring laws against exam paper leak, conducting all recruitment exams on time, and jobs will be given on merit, not recommendations.
  - Unemployment allowance of ₹3000.
  - Implementation of the Old Pension Scheme.
- Agriculture: Minimum Support price (MSP) for agricultural products. controlled atmosphere stores, markets, and food processing units; pesticides and fertilizers at cheap rates; Establish apple packaging manufacturing unit.
- Traders: an advisory board for traders, end of raid raj and "inspector rule", An amnesty scheme for VAT refund. Single window clearance system for tourism projects
- Corruption-free administration, door step delivery of public services.
- Free Healthcare: Mohalla clinics similar to Delhi and free healthcare.
- Free Education: Free education for all till tenth standard. Making temporary teacher posts permanent. Building more schools with quality education. Prevent private schools from exorbitantly raising fees.
- Women: A monthly allowance of ₹1000 to all women in Himachal Pradesh and double to women above the age of 65.
- ₹10 lakh annual grant to Panchayats and ₹10,000 salary for panchayat pradhans.
- Free pilgrimage scheme
- ₹1 crore compensation for soldiers killed in the line of duty.

=== Bharatiya Janata Party ===
The BJP has launched ‘Mission Repeat’ with an aim to retain power in the State. BJP leader and PM Narendra Modi held two rallies in Una and Chamba and also inaugurated various projects in state.

BJP has also launched website to seek suggestions for its manifesto.

On 30 October, 30 campaigners of the party held simultaneous rallies in all 68 constituencies.

==== Manifesto ====
- Youth: BJP promised the "Him Startup" scheme, with a corpus of ₹900 crore for the youth of the state.
- Employment: Amid criticism by the opposition for unemployment, it announced the created of 8 lakh job opportunities.
- Health: Creation of 5 new medical colleges. Amount of mobile clinics in every assembly constituency will be doubled.
- Road infrastructure: All-weather roads will connect all villages with an investment of ₹5,000 crore.
- Education: Bicycles will be given to girls from class 6 to 12 to go to schools. Setting up of two girls hostels in every district.
- Pilgrimage: Under the "Shakti" scheme, ₹12,000 crore will be spent over 10 years to develop infrastructure and transportation around areas of religious significance.
- Agriculture: An additional grant of ₹3,000 annually under the PM - Kisan Nidhi Yojna, 10 lakh farmers will be added to the program.
- Investigation of Waqf properties as per law under a judicial commission.
- Salaries: Discrepancies in disbursal of salaries to government workers will be removed.
- Increased compensation to soldiers' kin killed in the line of duty.
- GST will be limited to 12% for apple growers.
- Implementation of the Uniform Civil Code.

=== Indian National Congress ===
From August 17 to 22, the Indian National Congress organized demonstrations throughout Himachal Pradesh as a part of its "Mehangai Chaupal". The block units of the Himachal PCC protested in all the 68 constituencies against price rise and inflation. The protests were a part of the wider "Halla Bol" demonstrations organized by the Congress against the BJP-led government in Delhi.

On 31 August 2022, the Indian National Congress launched its manifesto with its 10 guarantees in Himachal Ka Sankalp.

On 14 October 2022, Congress started its campaign with its "Parivartan Pratigya Rally" in Solan with senior Congress leaders, Priyanka Gandhi, Pratibha Singh, Mukesh Agnihotri, and Bhupesh Baghel.

On 4 November 2022, Priyanka Gandhi addressed a rally in Nagrota Bagwan, Kangra. She promised 1 lakh government jobs and restoration of the Old Pension Scheme in the first cabinet meeting if the Congress comes to power.

==== Manifesto ====
- Employment: Congress promised 5 lakh jobs to Himachal Pradesh youth out of which 1 lakh government jobs would be given in the first meeting of the cabinet after the formation of the government amid the country-wide unemployment crisis.
- Youth: Implementation of a Rs 680 crore startup fund, for which ₹10 crore would be provided to all assembly segments in the State. Interest free loans to youth would also be given.
- Healthcare: Congress promised to create free mobile clinics and upgrade health facilities as a part of its 10 guarantees in Himachal Ka Sankalp. Mobile clinics will be opened in all villages.
- Education: Quality education with English medium schools in assembly segments.
- Agriculture: Congress promised to buy 10 litres of milk from locals who own cows and buffaloes besides purchasing cow dung for Rs 2 per kg. Apple orchardists, who have been growing increasingly restless due to diminishing returns, have been told that they would be given the freedom to fix the right price for their fruits. It has also promised fair prices for crops and fruits
- Electricity: Free electricity up to 300 units monthly for all households.
- Women: Monthly ₹1500 financial assistance to women aged 18-60 years
- Senior Citizens: Congress promised reimplementation of the Old Pension Scheme, which it did in Rajasthan and Chhattisgarh. Citizens above 75 years of age will be given special social security pension.
- Tourism: A new policy will be started to promote tourism in villages, "Smart Village" project will be started.

== Surveys and polls ==
=== Opinion polls ===
- Active Parties
- Bharatiya Janata Party
- Indian National Congress
- Aam Aadmi Party
- Others

Polling firm/Commissioner	Date published					Lead
Polling firm/Commissioner	Date published	BJP	INC	AAP	Others	Lead
ABP News-CVoter	2 October 2022	45.2%	33.9%	9.5%	11.4%	11.3%
ABP News-CVoter	14 October 2022	46.0%	35.2%	6.3%	12.5%	10.8%
India TV-Matrize	4 November 2022	46%	42%	2%	10%	4%
ABP News-CVoter	9 November 2022	44.8%	44.2%	3.3%	11.4%	0.6%

Polling firm/Commissioner	Date published					Lead
Polling firm/Commissioner	Date published	BJP	INC	AAP	Others	Lead
ABP News-CVoter	2 October 2022	37-45	21-29	0-1	0-3	16
ABP News-CVoter	14 October 2022	38-46	20-28	0-1	0-2	18
India TV-Matrize	4 November 2022	41	25	0	2	16
ABP News-CVoter	9 November 2022	31-39	29-37	0-1	0-3	HUNG

=== Exit polls ===
The Election Commission of India prohibited the conduct of any exit poll and publishing the result of exit polls from 12 November 2022 and 6:30 PM on 5 December 2022. Accordingly, these exit polls were released on the evening of 5 December.

- Active Parties
- Bharatiya Janata Party
- Indian National Congress
- Aam Aadmi Party
- Others

Polling agency				
Polling agency	BJP	INC	AAP	Others
Aaj Tak-Axis My India	24-34	30-40	0	4-8
ABP News-CVoter	33-41	24-32	0	0-4
India TV-Matrize	35-40	26-31	0	0-3
News 24-Today's Chanakya	33	33	0	2
NewsX-Jan Ki Baat	32-40	27-34	0	1-2
Republic TV-P MARQ	34-39	28-33	0-1	1-4
Times Now-ETG	34-42	24-32	0	1-3
TV9 Gujarati	33	31	0	4
Zee News-BARC	35-40	20-25	0-3	1-5
Poll of Polls (Average)	35	30	0	3
Actual Result	25	40	0	3

== Voter turnout ==
The voter turnout of 75.60% was recorded in Himachal Pradesh as per provisional data.

District	Seats	Turnout (%)
Chamba	5	73.90
Kangra	15	71.91
Lahaul and Spiti	1	73.74
Kullu	4	76.98
Mandi	10	75.31
Hamirpur	5	71.80
Una	5	76.91
Bilaspur	4	76.44
Solan	5	77.08
Sirmaur	5	79.91
Shimla	8	72.95
Kinnaur	1	72.56
Total	68	75.60

== Results ==
The Indian National Congress emerged victorious with 40 seats, whereas the Bharatiya Janata Party fell down to 25 seats. Notably, the BJP lost all of its seats in union minister Anurag Thakur's home district Hamirpur to the Congress and 1 independent. 8 cabinet ministers in the BJP government lost their seats. 3 BJP rebels won as independents. On the other hand, lone CPI(M) MLA Rakesh Singha lost his seat to Congress candidate Kuldeep Singh Rathore.

=== Results by alliance and party ===
Party	INC	BJP	Oth
Seats	40	25	3

Vote Share by alliance
1. INC (43.9%)
2. BJP (43.0%)
3. IND (9.70%)
4. AAP (1.10%)
5. Other (2.30%)

Party	Popular vote			Seats		
Party	Votes	%	±pp	Contested	Won	+/−
Indian National Congress	1,852,504	43.90	▲2.22	68	40	▲19
Bharatiya Janata Party	1,814,530	43.00	▼5.79	68	25	▼19
Aam Aadmi Party	46,270	1.10	▲1.10	67	0	Steady
Communist Party of India (Marxist)	27,817	0.66	▼0.81	11	0	▼1
Rashtriya Devbhumi Party	25,861	0.61	▲	29	0	Steady
Bahujan Samaj Party	14,613	0.35	▼0.2	53	0	Steady
Independents	409,273	9.7	▲		3	▲1
Others	3,906	0.09				
NOTA	24,861	0.59				
Total	4,219,635	100%				
Valid votes	4,219,635					
Invalid votes						
Votes cast/ turnout	4,238,412	75.78				
Abstentions						
Registered voters	5,592,828					
Source: Election Commission of India

Seat Share
1. INC (58.8%)
2. BJP (36.8%)
3. Others (4.41%)
4. 0.00%

=== Results by division ===
District	Seats			
District	Seats	INC	BJP	OTH
Kangra	25	16	8	1
Mandi	24	9	14	1
Shimla	19	15	3	1
Total	68	40	25	3

=== Results by district ===
Division	District	Seats			
Division	District	Seats	INC	BJP	OTH
Kangra	Chamba	5	2	3	0
Kangra	Kangra	15	10	4	1
Kangra	Una	5	4	1	0
Mandi	Lahaul and Spiti	1	1	0	0
Mandi	Kullu	4	2	2	0
Mandi	Mandi	10	1	9	0
Mandi	Hamirpur	5	4	0	1
Mandi	Bilaspur	4	1	3	0
Shimla	Solan	5	4	0	1
Shimla	Sirmaur	5	3	2	0
Shimla	Shimla	8	7	1	0
Shimla	Kinnaur	1	1	0	0
Total		68	40	25	3

=== Results by constituency ===
District	Constituency		Winner				Runner-up				Margin
District	#	Name	Candidate	Party	Votes	%	Candidate	Party	Votes	%	Margin
Chamba	1	Churah (SC)	Hans Raj	BJP	32,095	51.49	Yashwant Singh	INC	29,453	47.26	2,642
Chamba	2	Bharmour (ST)	Janak Raj	BJP	30,336	53.68	Thakur Singh Bharmouri	INC	25,164	44.53	5,172
Chamba	3	Chamba	Neeraj Nayar	INC	32,783	53.28	Neelam Nayyar	BJP	25,001	40.63	7,782
Chamba	4	Dalhousie	Dhavinder Singh Thakur	BJP	33,488	57.49	Asha Kumari	INC	23,570	40.47	9,918
Chamba	5	Bhattiyat	Kuldeep Singh Pathania	INC	25,989	43.73	Bikram Singh	BJP	24,422	41.10	1,567
Kangra	6	Nurpur	Ranbir Singh	BJP	44,132	62.45	Ajay Mahajan	INC	25,380	35.92	18,752
Kangra	7	Indora (SC)	Malender Rajan	INC	30,797	45.55	Reeta Devi	BJP	28,547	42.22	2,250
Kangra	8	Fatehpur	Bhawani Singh Pathania	INC	33,238	51.83	Rakesh Pathania	BJP	25,884	40.36	7,354
Kangra	9	Jawali	Chander Kumar	INC	38,243	51.22	Sanjay Guleria	BJP	35,212	47.16	3,031
Kangra	10	Dehra	Hoshyar Singh	IND	22,997	37.96	Rajesh Sharma	INC	19,120	31.56	3,877
Kangra	11	Jaswan-Pragpur	Bikram Singh	BJP	22,658	38.27	Surinder Singh Mankotia	INC	20,869	35.25	1,789
Kangra	12	Jawalamukhi	Sanjay Rattan	INC	27,827	46.48	Ravinder Singh	BJP	21,423	35.78	6,404
Kangra	13	Jaisinghpur (SC)	Yadvinder Goma	INC	28,058	50.43	Ravinder Kumar Dhiman	BJP	25,362	45.58	2,696
Kangra	14	Sullah	Vipin Singh Parmar	BJP	36,670	48.35	Jagjiwan Paul	IND	29,558	38.97	7,112
Kangra	15	Nagrota	R.S. Bali	INC	42,079	59.88	Arun Kumar	BJP	26,187	37.26	15,892
Kangra	16	Kangra	Pawan Kumar Kajal	BJP	35,239	55.64	Surinder Kumar	INC	15,405	24.32	19,834
Kangra	17	Shahpur	Kewal Singh Pathania	INC	36,603	55.39	Sarveen Choudhary	BJP	24,360	36.86	12,243
Kangra	18	Dharamshala	Sudhir Sharma	INC	27,323	45.53	Rakesh Kumar	BJP	24,038	40.06	3,285
Kangra	19	Palampur	Ashish Butail	INC	30,874	53.72	Trilok Kapoor	BJP	25,546	44.45	5,328
Kangra	20	Baijnath (SC)	Kishori Lal	INC	29,338	50.32	Mulkh Raj	BJP	25,892	44.41	3,446
Lahaul and Spiti	21	Lahaul and Spiti (ST)	Ravi Thakur	INC	9,948	52.91	Ram Lal Markanda	BJP	8,332	44.32	1,616
Kullu	22	Manali	Bhuvneshwar Gaur	INC	29,892	49.46	Govind Singh Thakur	BJP	26,935	44.57	2,957
Kullu	23	Kullu	Sunder Singh Thakur	INC	30,286	42.56	Narottam Singh	BJP	26,183	36.79	4,103
Kullu	24	Banjar	Surender Shourie	BJP	25,038	40.44	Khimi Ram	INC	20,704	33.44	4,334
Kullu	25	Anni (SC)	Lokender Kumar	BJP	24,133	35.77	Paras Ram	IND	17,355	25.72	6,778
Mandi	26	Karsog (SC)	Deepraj Kapoor	BJP	34,512	57.36	Mahesh Raj	INC	23,978	39.85	10,534
Mandi	27	Sundernagar	Rakesh Jamwal	BJP	29,432	44.16	Sohan Lal	INC	21,307	31.97	8,125
Mandi	28	Nachan (SC)	Vinod Kumar	BJP	33,200	46.40	Naresh Kumar	INC	24,244	33.88	8,956
Mandi	29	Seraj	Jai Ram Thakur	BJP	53,562	75.70	Chet Ram	INC	15,379	21.74	38,183
Mandi	30	Darang	Puran Chand Thakur	BJP	36,572	49.76	Kaul Singh Thakur	INC	35,954	48.92	618
Mandi	31	Jogindernagar	Prakash Rana	BJP	33,782	47.87	Surender Paul Thakur	INC	29,443	41.73	4,339
Mandi	32	Dharampur	Chander Shekhar Thakur	INC	31,063	51.90	Rajat Thakur	BJP	28,037	46.84	3,026
Mandi	33	Mandi	Anil Sharma	BJP	31,303	53.37	Champa Thakur	INC	21.297	36.31	10,006
Mandi	34	Balh (SC)	Inder Singh Gandhi	BJP	31,792	49.12	Prakash Chaudhary	INC	30,485	47.1	1,307
Mandi	35	Sarkaghat	Dalip Thakur	BJP	27,346	42.89	Pawan Kumar	INC	25,539	40.05	1,807
Hamirpur	36	Bhoranj (SC)	Suresh Kumar	INC	24,779	43.16	Dr. Anil Dhaman	BJP	24,719	43.05	60
Hamirpur	37	Sujanpur	Rajinder Rana	INC	27,679	49.79	Ranjit Singh Rana	BJP	27,280	49.07	399
Hamirpur	38	Hamirpur	Ashish Sharma	IND	25,916	47.09	Pushpinder Vwema	INC	13,017	23.65	12,899
Hamirpur	39	Barsar	Inderdutt Lakhanpal	INC	30,293	48.16	Maya Sharma	BJP	16.501	26.23	13,792
Hamirpur	40	Nadaun	Sukhvinder Singh Sukhu	INC	36,142	50.88	Vijay Kumar	BJP	32,779	46.14	3,363
Una	41	Chintpurni (SC)	Sudarshan Singh Babloo	INC	32,712	52.7	Balbir Singh	BJP	27,854	44.87	4,858
Una	42	Gagret	Chaitanya Sharma	INC	40,767	61.15	Rajesh Thakur	BJP	25,082	37.62	15,685
Una	43	Haroli	Mukesh Agnihotri	INC	38,652	55.33	Ram Kumar	BJP	29,504	42.23	9,148
Una	44	Una	Satpal Singh Satti	BJP	33,974	50.05	Satpal Raizada	INC	32,238	47.49	1,736
Una	45	Kutlehar	Davinder Kumar Bhutto	INC	36,636	54.84	Virender Kanwar	BJP	29,057	43.49	7,579
Bilaspur	46	Jhanduta (SC)	Jeet Ram Katwal	BJP	28,268	46.72	Vivek Kumar	INC	22.469	37.14	5,799
Bilaspur	47	Ghumarwin	Rajesh Dharmani	INC	35,378	51.96	Rajinder Garg	BJP	29,767	43.72	5,611
Bilaspur	48	Bilaspur	Trilok Jamwal	BJP	30,988	47.76	Bumber Thakur	INC	30,712	47.34	276
Bilaspur	49	Sri Naina Deviji	Randhir Sharma	BJP	29,403	47.23	Ram Lal Thakur	INC	29,232	46.96	171
Solan	50	Arki	Sanjay Awasthy	INC	30,897	42.02	Rajender	IND	26,075	35.46	4,822
Solan	51	Nalagarh	K. L. Thakur	IND	33,427	44.51	Hardeep Singh Bhawa	INC	20,163	26.85	13,264
Solan	52	Doon	Ram Kumar	INC	32,038	51.89	Paramjeet Singh Pammi	BJP	25,227	40.86	6,811
Solan	53	Solan (SC)	Dhani Ram Shandil	INC	30,089	51.54	Rajesh Kashyap	BJP	26,231	44.39	3,858
Solan	54	Kasauli (SC)	Vinod Kumar Sultanpuri	INC	28,200	52.1	Rajiv Saizal	BJP	21,432	39.6	6,768
Sirmaur	55	Pachhad (SC)	Reena Kashyap	BJP	21,215	34.52	Dayal Pyari	INC	17,358	28.25	3,857
Sirmaur	56	Nahan	Ajay Solanki	INC	35,291	50.08	Rajeev Bindal	BJP	33,652	47.75	1,639
Sirmaur	57	Sri Renukaji (SC)	Vinay Kumar	INC	28,642	47.99	Narain Singh	BJP	27,782	46.55	860
Sirmaur	58	Paonta Sahib	Sukh Ram Chaudhary	BJP	31,008	46.93	Kirnesh Jung	INC	22,412	33.92	8,596
Sirmaur	59	Shillai	Harshwardhan Chauhan	INC	32,093	49.17	Baldev Singh Tomar	BJP	31,711	48.58	382
Shimla	60	Chopal	Balbir Singh Verma	BJP	25,873	41.58	Rajneesh Kimta	INC	20,840	33.49	5,033
Shimla	61	Theog	Kuldeep Singh Rathore	INC	19,447	29.47	Ajay Shyam	BJP	14,178	21.49	5,269
Shimla	62	Kasumpti	Anirudh Singh	INC	25,759	55.43	Suresh Bhardwaj	BJP	17,104	36.81	8,655
Shimla	63	Shimla	Harish Janartha	INC	15,803	51.35	Jatin Puri	BJP	12,766	41.48	3,037
Shimla	64	Shimla Rural	Vikramaditya Singh	INC	35,269	60.19	Ravi Kumar Mehta	BJP	21,409	36.54	13,860
Shimla	65	Jubbal-Kotkhai	Rohit Thakur	INC	31,393	52.65	Chetan Singh Bragta	BJP	26,324	44.15	5,069
Shimla	66	Rampur (SC)	Nand Lal	INC	28,397	49.07	Kaul Singh	BJP	27,830	48.09	567
Shimla	67	Rohru (SC)	Mohan Lal Brakta	INC	34,327	61.90	Shashi Bala	BJP	14,988	27.03	19,339
Kinnaur	68	Kinnaur (ST)	Jagat Singh Negi	INC	20,696	46.95	Surat Negi	BJP	13.732	31.15	6,964

== Bypolls (2022-2027) ==
Date	Constituency		Previous MLA		Reason	Elected MLA	
1 June 2024	18	Dharamshala	Sudhir Sharma	Indian National Congress	Disqualified on 29 February 2024	Sudhir Sharma	Bharatiya Janata Party
1 June 2024	21	Lahaul and Spiti	Ravi Thakur	Indian National Congress	Disqualified on 29 February 2024	Anuradha Rana	Indian National Congress
1 June 2024	37	Sujanpur	Rajinder Rana	Indian National Congress	Disqualified on 29 February 2024	Ranjit Singh	Indian National Congress
1 June 2024	39	Barsar	Inder Dutt Lakhanpal	Indian National Congress	Disqualified on 29 February 2024	Inder Dutt Lakhanpal	Bharatiya Janata Party
1 June 2024	42	Gagret	Chaitanya Sharma	Indian National Congress	Disqualified on 29 February 2024	Rakesh Kalia	Indian National Congress
1 June 2024	45	Kutlehar	Davinder Kumar Bhutto	Indian National Congress	Disqualified on 29 February 2024	Vivek Sharma	Indian National Congress
10 July 2024	10	Dehra	Hoshyar Singh	Independent	Resigned on 22 March 2024	Kamlesh Thakur	Indian National Congress
10 July 2024	38	Hamirpur	Ashish Sharma	Independent	Resigned on 22 March 2024	Ashish Sharma	Bharatiya Janata Party
10 July 2024	51	Nalagarh	K.L. Thakur	Independent	Resigned on 22 March 2024	Hardeep Singh Bawa	Indian National Congress

== See also ==
- Elections in Himachal Pradesh
- Politics of Himachal Pradesh
