= Malender Rajan =

Indian politician

Malender Rajan (born 1973) is an Indian politician from Himachal Pradesh. He is an MLA from Indora Assembly constituency, which is reserved for Scheduled Caste community, in Kangra District. He won the 2022 Himachal Pradesh Legislative Assembly election representing the Indian National Congress.

== Early life and education ==
Rajan is from Indora, Kangra district, Himachal Pradesh. He is the son of Surjit Chander. He completed his Civil Engineering at G.P.H., Hamirpur in 1993, and later did a Post Graduate Diploma in computer applications from S.D. College, Pathankot in 1994. His wife is a government teacher.

== Career ==
Rajan won from Indora Assembly constituency representing the Indian National Congress in the 2022 Himachal Pradesh Legislative Assembly election. He polled 30,797 votes and defeated his nearest rival, Reeta Devi of the Bharatiya Janata Party, by a margin of 2,250 votes.
