= Dilip Thakur =

Indian politician

Member of the Himachal Legislative Assembly
- Incumbent
- Assumed office 2022
- Constituency: Sarkaghat Assembly constituency

Personal details
- Political party: BJP
- Occupation: Politician

Dilip Thakur is the current MLA for the Sarkaghat constituency in the Himachal Pradesh Legislative Assembly. He won the election in Himachal Pradesh Legislative Assembly election in 2022.

Thakur won the election defeating INC candidate Pawan Kumar.
