= Reeta Devi =

Reeta Devi may refer to:

- Reeta Devi (social worker)
- Reeta Devi (politician)
