= Davinder Kumar Bhutto =

Indian politician

Member of the Himachal Pradesh Legislative Assembly
- Preceded by: Virender Kanwar
- Succeeded by: Vivek Sharma
- Constituency: Kutlehar

Personal details
- Born: 1974 (age 51–52) Una district, Himachal Pradesh
- Party: Bharatiya Janata Party
- Other political affiliations: Indian National Congress

Davinder Kumar Bhutto (born 1974) is an Indian politician from Himachal Pradesh. He was a member of the Himachal Pradesh Legislative Assembly from Kutlehar Assembly constituency in Una district. He won the 2022 Himachal Pradesh Legislative Assembly election representing the Indian National Congress.

== Early life and education ==
Bhutto is from Kutlehar, Una district, Himachal Pradesh. He is the son of Piar Singh. He passed Class 12 in 2011 through National Institute of Open Schooling.

== Career ==
Bhutto won from Kutlehar Assembly constituency representing the Indian National Congress in the 2022 Himachal Pradesh Legislative Assembly election. He polled 36,636 votes and defeated his nearest rival, Virender Kanwar of the Bharatiya Janata Party, by a margin of 7,579 votes. In February 2024, he was disqualified along with five other Congress MLAs for cross voting for BJP in the Rajya Sabha election. In May 2024 by election, he contested on the BJP ticket and lost the Kutlehar seat to his Congress rival Vivek Sharma by 5,356 votes. He polled 31,497 votes against 36,853 votes garnered by Sharma.
