= Mohan Lal Brakta =

Indian politician

Chief Parliamentary Secretary Mohan Lal Brakta

Member of the Himachal Pradesh Legislative Assembly
- Incumbent
- Assumed office 2012
- Preceded by: Khushi Ram Balnahta
- Constituency: Rohru

Personal details
- Born: 19 June 1965 (age 60)
- Party: INC
- Spouse: Ranjna Brakta
- Parent: Teju Ram (father)
- Education: LL.B.
- Alma mater: Himachal Pradesh University

Mohan Lal Brakta is the current MLA for the Rohru constituency in the Himachal Pradesh Legislative Assembly and Chief Parliamentary Secretary and a prominent Koli leader by caste. He was elected at the December 2022 Legislative Assembly election.

Mohan Lal Brakta is the MLA since 2012. He has a degree in LL.B.

== Personal life ==
Mohan Lal Brakta was born to Shri Teju Ram Koli on 19 June 1965 at Rohru, Distt. Shimla and married to Smt. Ranjna Brakta. Brakta has one son and one daughter.

== Political career ==
Mohan Lal Brakta was elected to the Himachal Pradesh State Legislative Assembly in 2012 and remained Member of Estimates, Rural Planning, Public Undertakings, Welfare, Privileges and Ethics Committees from 2013 to 2017.

Brakta was re-elected to the thirteenth Vidhan Sabha (2nd term) and nominated as Member of Welfare, Rule and e-Governance-cum-General Purposes Committees.

He was re-elected to 14th Legislative Assembly in December, 2022.
