= Sarkaghat Assembly constituency =

Legislative Assembly constituency in Himachal Pradesh, India

Coordinates: 31.7°N 76.74°E

Sarkaghat
- Constituency No. 35 for the Himachal Pradesh Legislative Assembly

Constituency details
- Country: India
- Region: North India
- State: Himachal Pradesh
- District: Mandi
- Lok Sabha constituency: Mandi
- Established: 1967
- Total electors: 92,207
- Reservation: None

Member of Legislative Assembly
- 14th Himachal Pradesh Legislative Assembly
- Incumbent Dilip Thakur
- Party: Bharatiya Janata Party
- Elected year: 2022

Sarkaghat Assembly constituency is one of the 68 constituencies in the Himachal Pradesh Legislative Assembly of Himachal Pradesh a northern state of India. Sarkaghat is also part of Mandi Lok Sabha constituency.

== Member of Legislative Assembly ==
Year	Member	Party
1967	V. Sagar	Independent politician
1972	Ram Rakha	Indian National Congress
1977	Vijay Kumar Joshi	Janata Party
1982	Vijay Kumar Joshi	Indian National Congress
1985	Vijay Kumar Joshi	Indian National Congress
1990	Kashmiri Lal Joshi	Bharatiya Janata Party
1993	Vijay Kumar Joshi	Indian National Congress
1998	Jai Krishan Sharma	Bharatiya Janata Party
2003	Mukesh Agnihotri	Indian National Congress
2007	Mukesh Agnihotri	Indian National Congress
2012	Inder Singh	Bharatiya Janata Party
2017	Inder Singh	Bharatiya Janata Party
2022	Dalip Thakur	Bharatiya Janata Party

== Election results ==
=== Assembly Election 2022 ===
2022 Himachal Pradesh Legislative Assembly election: Sarkaghat
Party	Candidate	Votes	%	±%
BJP	Dilip Thakur	27,346	42.89	▼9.44
INC	Pawan Kumar	25,539	40.05	▲3.58
Independent	Munish Sharma	9,860	15.46	New
NOTA	Nota	342	0.54	▼0.15
RDP	Kailash Chand	262	0.41	New
AAP	Dhameshwar Ram	210	0.33	New
BSP	Ramesh Chand	202	0.32	New
Margin of victory		1,807	2.83	▼13.02
Turnout		63,761	69.15	▼1.75
Registered electors		92,207		▲11.42
BJP hold		Swing	▼9.44	

=== Assembly Election 2017 ===
2017 Himachal Pradesh Legislative Assembly election: Sarkaghat
Party	Candidate	Votes	%	±%
BJP	Inder Singh	30,705	52.33	▲2.94
INC	Pawan Kumar	21,403	36.48	▼8.84
CPI(M)	Munish Sharma	3,653	6.23	New
NOTA	None of the Above	403	0.69	New
Margin of victory		9,302	15.85	▲11.78
Turnout		58,677	70.90	▲0.41
Registered electors		82,756		▲7.83
BJP hold		Swing	▲2.94	

=== Assembly Election 2012 ===
2012 Himachal Pradesh Legislative Assembly election: Sarkaghat
Party	Candidate	Votes	%	±%
BJP	Inder Singh	26,722	49.39	▲7.84
INC	Rangila Ram Rao	24,518	45.32	▼7.40
Independent	Kishor Kumar	1,155	2.13	New
Independent	Moti Ram	440	0.81	New
BSP	Kashmir Singh	358	0.66	▼3.41
AITC	Ajay Kumar	352	0.65	New
Margin of victory		2,204	4.07	▼7.09
Turnout		54,105	70.50	▼4.06
Registered electors		76,750		▼3.52
BJP gain from INC		Swing	▼3.33	

=== Assembly Election 2007 ===
2007 Himachal Pradesh Legislative Assembly election: Sarkaghat
Party	Candidate	Votes	%	±%
INC	Mukesh Agnihotri	31,267	52.72	▲19.81
BJP	Jagroop Singh	24,643	41.55	▲20.16
BSP	Vijay Kumar Joshi	2,414	4.07	▲2.08
Independent	Mukesh Chaudhary	555	0.94	New
LJP	Dr. Lekh Raj Khanna	373	0.63	▼0.44
Margin of victory		6,624	11.17	▲1.06
Turnout		59,311	74.55	▲4.07
Registered electors		79,554		▲12.79
INC hold		Swing	▲19.81	

=== Assembly Election 2003 ===
2003 Himachal Pradesh Legislative Assembly election: Sarkaghat
Party	Candidate	Votes	%	±%
INC	Mukesh Agnihotri	16,360	32.91	▲6.74
Independent	Jagroop Singh	11,336	22.80	New
BJP	Jai Krishan Sharma	10,634	21.39	▼10.36
HVC	Vijay Kumar Joshi	5,102	10.26	▼5.44
Independent	Jagjit Singh Mankotia	2,588	5.21	New
NCP	Dr. Col. Surindra Singh Rana	1,138	2.29	New
Independent	Dr. Lekh Raj Khanna	1,035	2.08	New
BSP	Ch. Parmod Kumar	990	1.99	▼17.33
LJP	Prem Bhatia	529	1.06	New
Margin of victory		5,024	10.11	▲4.52
Turnout		49,712	70.51	▲3.74
Registered electors		70,531		▲13.79
INC gain from BJP		Swing	▲1.16	

=== Assembly Election 1998 ===
1998 Himachal Pradesh Legislative Assembly election: Sarkaghat
Party	Candidate	Votes	%	±%
BJP	Jai Krishan Sharma	13,136	31.75	▲6.11
INC	Onkar Sharma	10,825	26.17	▼7.72
BSP	Kashmiri Lal Bharwal	7,992	19.32	▼3.71
HVC	Vijay Kumar Joshi	6,497	15.70	New
AIRJP	Kashmiri Lal Joshi	1,734	4.19	New
JD	Sarwan Singh	710	1.72	▲1.10
CPI(M)	Om Parkash Dutta	477	1.15	▼2.10
Margin of victory		2,311	5.59	▼2.65
Turnout		41,371	68.49	▲3.89
Registered electors		61,984		▼0.70
BJP gain from INC		Swing	▼2.13	

=== Assembly Election 1993 ===
1993 Himachal Pradesh Legislative Assembly election: Sarkaghat
Party	Candidate	Votes	%	±%
INC	Vijay Kumar Joshi	13,292	33.88	▲3.18
BJP	Kashmiri Lal Joshi	10,061	25.65	▼26.73
BSP	Kashmiri Lal Vahati	9,036	23.03	New
Independent	Hakumat Rai	5,281	13.46	New
CPI(M)	Ravinder Joshi	1,278	3.26	▲0.63
JD	Harbans Singh	243	0.62	New
Margin of victory		3,231	8.24	▼13.44
Turnout		39,231	63.43	▼3.78
Registered electors		62,419		▲2.56
INC gain from BJP		Swing	▼18.49	

=== Assembly Election 1990 ===
1990 Himachal Pradesh Legislative Assembly election: Sarkaghat
Party	Candidate	Votes	%	±%
BJP	Kashmiri Lal Joshi	21,240	52.37	▲5.46
INC	Vijay Kumar Joshi	12,451	30.70	▼17.86
Independent	Mool Raj	3,178	7.84	New
INS(SCS)	Arjan Singh	1,296	3.20	New
CPI(M)	Dharam Singh	1,064	2.62	▼1.90
Independent	Bakshi Ram	663	1.63	New
Doordarshi Party	Radha Rani	311	0.77	New
Margin of victory		8,789	21.67	▲20.02
Turnout		40,555	67.12	▼1.94
Registered electors		60,862		▲29.99
BJP gain from INC		Swing	▲3.81	

=== Assembly Election 1985 ===
1985 Himachal Pradesh Legislative Assembly election: Sarkaghat
Party	Candidate	Votes	%	±%
INC	Vijay Kumar Joshi	15,591	48.56	▲12.40
BJP	Kashmiri Lal	15,062	46.92	▲27.60
CPI(M)	Dharam Singh	1,451	4.52	New
Margin of victory		529	1.65	▼2.51
Turnout		32,104	69.38	▲2.24
Registered electors		46,819		▲6.06
INC hold		Swing		

=== Assembly Election 1982 ===
1982 Himachal Pradesh Legislative Assembly election: Sarkaghat
Party	Candidate	Votes	%	±%
INC	Vijay Kumar Joshi	10,589	36.16	▲7.77
Independent	Kashmiri Lal Joshi	9,371	32.00	New
BJP	Mohinder Singh	5,657	19.32	New
CPI	Wattan Chand	1,437	4.91	▼6.58
Independent	Mahabir Singh	906	3.09	New
Independent	Gian Chand	558	1.91	New
Independent	Rakesh Dutt	498	1.70	New
JP	Hoshiar Singh	267	0.91	▼55.21
Margin of victory		1,218	4.16	▼23.57
Turnout		29,283	67.39	▲10.55
Registered electors		44,145		▼1.68
INC gain from JP		Swing	▼19.96	

=== Assembly Election 1977 ===
1977 Himachal Pradesh Legislative Assembly election: Sarkaghat
Party	Candidate	Votes	%	±%
JP	Vijay Kumar Joshi	14,058	56.12	New
INC	Kashmiri Lal Joshi	7,111	28.39	▼24.84
CPI	Wattan Chand	2,877	11.49	New
Independent	Ranjit Singh	418	1.67	New
Independent	Dharam Singh	308	1.23	New
Independent	Gulzari Ram Bhatti	160	0.64	New
Margin of victory		6,947	27.73	▲21.27
Turnout		25,049	56.56	▼6.00
Registered electors		44,901		▲72.05
JP gain from INC		Swing	▲2.89	

=== Assembly Election 1972 ===
1972 Himachal Pradesh Legislative Assembly election: Sarkaghat
Party	Candidate	Votes	%	±%
INC	Ram Rakha	8,584	53.23	▲10.95
Independent	Surinder Nath	7,542	46.77	New
Margin of victory		1,042	6.46	▲2.38
Turnout		16,126	62.98	▲4.10
Registered electors		26,098		▼17.27
INC gain from Independent		Swing	▲6.87	

=== Assembly Election 1967 ===
1967 Himachal Pradesh Legislative Assembly election: Sarkaghat
Party	Candidate	Votes	%	±%
Independent	V. Sagar	8,437	46.36	New
INC	S. Nath	7,695	42.28	New
ABJS	S. Sarup	2,067	11.36	New
Margin of victory		742	4.08	
Turnout		18,199	61.77	
Registered electors		31,547		
Independent win (new seat)				

== See also ==
- Sarkaghat
- List of constituencies of Himachal Pradesh Legislative Assembly
