= Chaitanya Sharma =

Indian politician (born 1994)

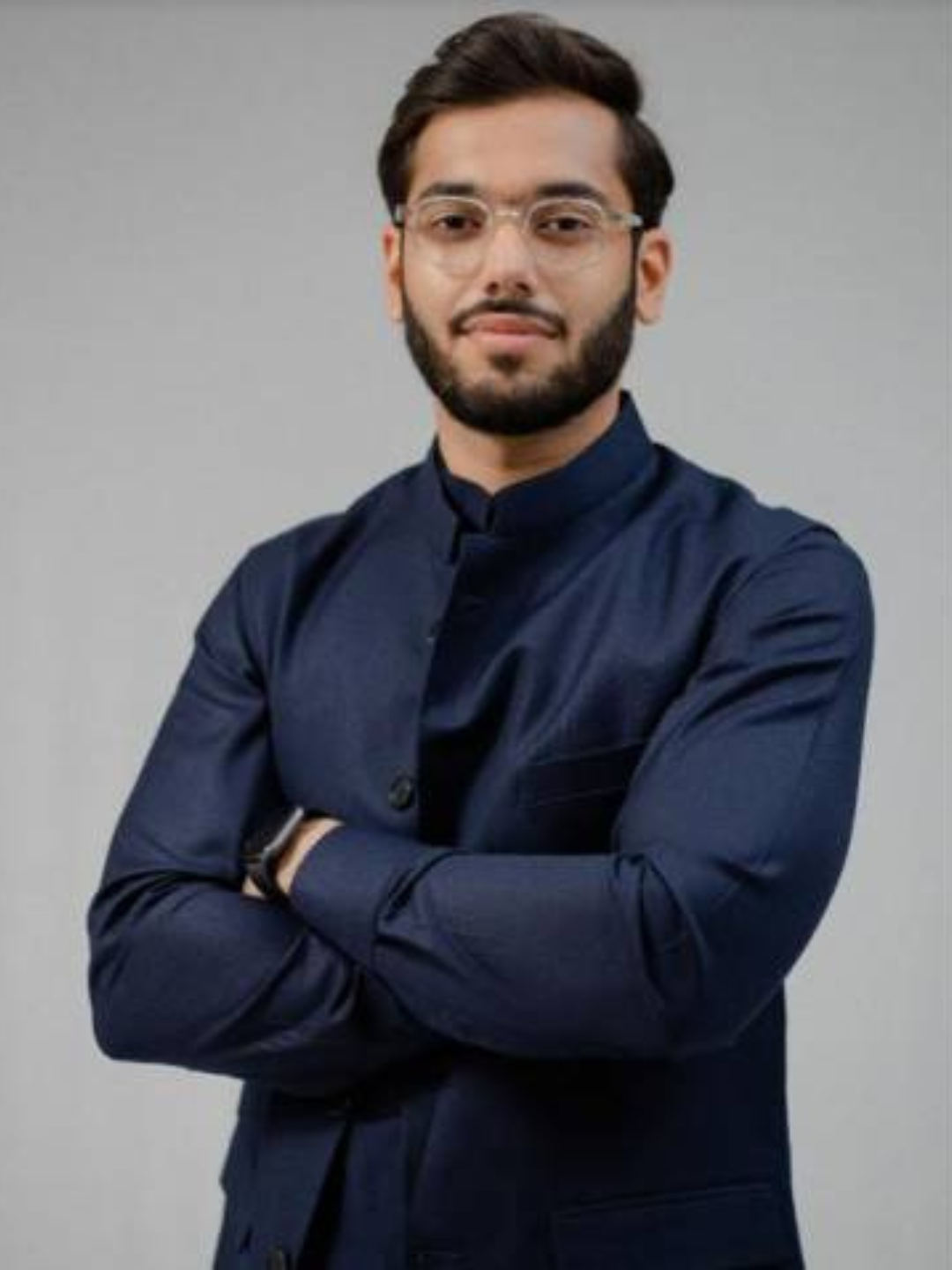

Member of the Himachal Pradesh Legislative Assembly
- In office 2022–2024
- Constituency: Gagret

Vice-President, BJYM (BJP Yuva Morcha), Himachal Pradesh

BJP Himachal Pradesh State Body Executive Committee (Karyakarini)

Personal details
- Born: 1994 (age 31–32) Una district, Himachal Pradesh
- Party: Bharatiya Janata Party
- Parent: Rakesh Sharma (father)
- Education: LLB, Bachelor of Arts
- Alma mater: Campus Law Centre, Delhi University, George Washington University

Chaitanya Sharma (born 1994) is an Indian politician from Himachal Pradesh. He was a member of the Himachal Pradesh Legislative Assembly from Gagret Assembly constituency in Una district. He won the 2022 Himachal Pradesh Legislative Assembly election and became one of the youngest MLAs in the Himachal Pradesh Assembly.

== Early life and education ==
Chaitanya Sharma holding LL.B. from the University of Delhi (2021) and a double major in International Policy and Religion, complemented by academic and policy experience at The George Washington University and the World Bank Group, Sharma combines global intellectual rigor with practical, grassroots engagement.

== Career ==
Chaitanya Sharma won the Zila Parishad election from the Bhanjal ward of Gagret Assembly constituency in 2021, as an independent candidate. As a Zila Parishad member, he had started three training centres for uplifting of soft skills and computer skills.

=== Gagret ===
In 2022, Chaitanya Sharma contested the Himachal Pradesh Legislative Assembly election from Gagret Assembly constituency. His win positioned him among the youngest legislators in the state. He polled 40,767 votes and won the election by a margin of 15,685 votes.

=== Organisational Leadership with BJP ===
Chaitanya Sharma joined Bhartiya Janata Party in 2024.

He was appointed on the Bhartiya Janata Party Himachal Pradesh State Body Executive Committee (Karyakarini).

In October 2025, he has been appointed as the Vice President for BJYM (BJP Yuva Morcha) Himachal Pradesh.

== Philanthropy ==
Sharma took many initiatives in the field of education, health services, and rural development. In January 2024, Chaitanya Sharma announced one year free bus and train services for Ayodhya Pilgrims.

=== Yuva Shakti Parakram (YSP) ===
With the vision of reaching the masses, he started Yuva Shakti Parakram (YSP), a youth-led social organization active in Una and surrounding districts of Himachal Pradesh. According to Divya Himachal, Sharma founded the organization to engage young people in regional development and civic activities, and also submitted public representations regarding railway connectivity and infrastructure development in the region.

The activities associated with Yuva Shakti Parakram have included village development efforts (Ujjwala Gram Shakti), skill development and employment-oriented programmes (Unnati Mein Shakti), health awareness initiatives (Swasthya Mein Shakti), women-focused programmes (Mahila Shakti Abhiyan), environmental activities (Prakriti Mein Shakti), social awareness campaigns (Parivartan Mein Shakti), and community service initiatives (Samajik Sewa Shakti).

In March 2024, Amar Ujala reported that the Sharma with his team organized a Women’s Day program in Una district, where women were felicitated for their social contributions. He has also been involved in youth mobilization programs and social awareness campaigns.
