= Nachan Assembly constituency =

Legislative Assembly constituency in Himachal Pradesh State, India

Coordinates: 31.58°N 77.03°E

Nachan
- Constituency No. 28 for the Himachal Pradesh Legislative Assembly

Constituency details
- Country: India
- Region: North India
- State: Himachal Pradesh
- District: Mandi
- Lok Sabha constituency: Mandi
- Established: 1977
- Total electors: 88,483
- Reservation: SC

Member of Legislative Assembly
- 14th Himachal Pradesh Legislative Assembly
- Incumbent Vinod Kumar
- Party: Bharatiya Janata Party
- Elected year: 2022

Nachan is one of the 68 constituencies in the Himachal Pradesh Legislative Assembly of Himachal Pradesh a northern state of India. It is a part of Mandi Lok Sabha constituency.

== Members of the Legislative Assembly ==
Year	Member	Picture	Party
1977	Dile Ram		Janata Party
1982	Dile Ram		Bharatiya Janata Party
1985	Tek Chand Dogra		Indian National Congress
1990	Dile Ram		Bharatiya Janata Party
1993	Tek Chand Dogra		Independent
1998	Tek Chand Dogra		Indian National Congress
2003	Tek Chand Dogra		Indian National Congress
2007	Dile Ram		Bharatiya Janata Party
2012	Vinod Kumar		Bharatiya Janata Party
2017	Vinod Kumar		Bharatiya Janata Party

== Election results ==
=== Assembly Election 2022 ===
2022 Himachal Pradesh Legislative Assembly election: Nachan
Party	Candidate	Votes	%	±%
BJP	Vinod Kumar	33,200	46.40%	▼14.27
INC	Naresh Kumar	24,244	33.88%	▼1.51
Independent	Gian Chand	10,133	14.16%	New
Independent	Jasveer Singh	2,691	3.76%	New
NOTA	Nota	456	0.64%	▼0.11
Margin of victory		8,956	12.52%	▼12.76
Turnout		71,559	80.87%	▲0.02
Registered electors		88,483		▲13.76
BJP hold		Swing	▼14.27	

=== Assembly Election 2017 ===
2017 Himachal Pradesh Legislative Assembly election: Nachan
Party	Candidate	Votes	%	±%
BJP	Vinod Kumar	38,154	60.66%	▲19.31
INC	Lal Singh Kaushal	22,258	35.39%	▼0.50
Independent	Satya Prakash	804	1.28%	New
NOTA	None of the Above	471	0.75%	New
Margin of victory		15,896	25.27%	▲19.81
Turnout		62,893	80.86%	▲2.33
Registered electors		77,783		▲10.20
BJP hold		Swing	▲19.31	

=== Assembly Election 2012 ===
2012 Himachal Pradesh Legislative Assembly election: Nachan
Party	Candidate	Votes	%	±%
BJP	Vinod Kumar	22,924	41.36%	▼13.50
INC	Tek Chand Dogra	19,893	35.89%	▼4.73
Independent	Damodar Singh	10,861	19.60%	New
HLC	Khem Raj	749	1.35%	New
BSP	Roshan Lal Thakural	527	0.95%	▼2.63
Independent	Bimla Devi	463	0.84%	New
Margin of victory		3,031	5.47%	▼8.77
Turnout		55,427	78.53%	▲0.09
Registered electors		70,584		▲3.91
BJP hold		Swing	▼13.50	

=== Assembly Election 2007 ===
2007 Himachal Pradesh Legislative Assembly election: Nachan
Party	Candidate	Votes	%	±%
BJP	Dile Ram	29,228	54.86%	▲22.26
INC	Tek Chand Dogra	21,640	40.62%	▲4.71
BSP	Roshan Lal Thukral	1,908	3.58%	New
SP	Chet Ram Chauhan	483	0.91%	New
Margin of victory		7,588	14.24%	▲10.93
Turnout		53,280	78.44%	▼1.01
Registered electors		67,926		▲10.87
BJP gain from INC		Swing	▲18.95	

=== Assembly Election 2003 ===
2003 Himachal Pradesh Legislative Assembly election: Nachan
Party	Candidate	Votes	%	±%
INC	Tek Chand	17,479	35.91%	▼0.23
BJP	Dile Ram	15,869	32.60%	▼1.63
HVC	Damodar Singh	11,295	23.20%	▲0.14
Independent	Krishan Kumar	2,285	4.69%	New
Independent	Sunder Lal	1,448	2.97%	New
Independent	Moti Ram	300	0.62%	New
Margin of victory		1,610	3.31%	▲1.40
Turnout		48,676	80.15%	▲3.45
Registered electors		61,267		▲16.94
INC hold		Swing	▼0.23	

=== Assembly Election 1998 ===
1998 Himachal Pradesh Legislative Assembly election: Nachan
Party	Candidate	Votes	%	±%
INC	Tek Chand	14,390	36.14%	▲27.82
BJP	Dile Ram	13,631	34.23%	▼1.05
HVC	Damodar	9,182	23.06%	New
Independent	Nikka Ram	2,287	5.74%	New
JD	Sohan Lal	328	0.82%	New
Margin of victory		759	1.91%	▼18.21
Turnout		39,818	76.75%	▼0.37
Registered electors		52,390		▲10.16
INC gain from Independent		Swing	▼19.25	

=== Assembly Election 1993 ===
1993 Himachal Pradesh Legislative Assembly election: Nachan
Party	Candidate	Votes	%	±%
Independent	Tek Chand	20,120	55.39%	New
BJP	Dile Ram	12,814	35.28%	▼20.15
INC	Sohan Lal	3,021	8.32%	▼31.92
BSP	Sunder Lal	217	0.60%	▼1.10
Margin of victory		7,306	20.11%	▲4.93
Turnout		36,322	76.86%	▲6.43
Registered electors		47,556		▲12.89
Independent gain from BJP		Swing	▼0.04	

=== Assembly Election 1990 ===
1990 Himachal Pradesh Legislative Assembly election: Nachan
Party	Candidate	Votes	%	±%
BJP	Dile Ram	16,334	55.43%	▲20.65
INC	Tek Chand	11,858	40.24%	▼18.36
CPI(M)	Ramji Dass	571	1.94%	New
BSP	Chander Mani	499	1.69%	New
Margin of victory		4,476	15.19%	▼8.63
Turnout		29,468	70.40%	▼4.13
Registered electors		42,126		▲30.26
BJP gain from INC		Swing	▼3.17	

=== Assembly Election 1985 ===
1985 Himachal Pradesh Legislative Assembly election: Nachan
Party	Candidate	Votes	%	±%
INC	Tek Chand	14,039	58.60%	▲16.92
BJP	Dile Ram (Mahadev)	8,332	34.78%	▼21.81
Independent	Deli Ram (Chachiot)	1,588	6.63%	New
Margin of victory		5,707	23.82%	▲8.91
Turnout		23,959	74.66%	▲5.04
Registered electors		32,341		▲6.43
INC gain from BJP		Swing		

=== Assembly Election 1982 ===
1982 Himachal Pradesh Legislative Assembly election: Nachan
Party	Candidate	Votes	%	±%
BJP	Dile Ram	11,873	56.59%	New
INC	Tek Chand	8,745	41.68%	▲12.33
JP	Minku Ram	363	1.73%	▼54.78
Margin of victory		3,128	14.91%	▼12.25
Turnout		20,981	69.63%	▲19.04
Registered electors		30,387		▲18.88
BJP gain from JP		Swing	▲0.08	

=== Assembly Election 1977 ===
1977 Himachal Pradesh Legislative Assembly election: Nachan
Party	Candidate	Votes	%	±%
JP	Dile Ram	7,222	56.51%	New
INC	Tehal Dass	3,751	29.35%	New
Independent	Dile Ram	1,617	12.65%	New
Independent	Nanku	130	1.02%	New
Margin of victory		3,471	27.16%	
Turnout		12,781	50.57%	
Registered electors		25,561		
JP win (new seat)				

== See also ==
- List of constituencies of Himachal Pradesh Legislative Assembly
