= Suresh Kumar (Himachal politician) =

Indian politician

Suresh Kumar (born 1967) is an Indian politician from Himachal Pradesh. He is an MLA from Bhoranj Assembly constituency, which is reserved for Scheduled Caste community, in Hamirpur district. He won the 2022 Himachal Pradesh Legislative Assembly election representing the Indian National Congress.

== Early life and education ==
Kumar is from Bhoranj, Hamirpur district, Himachal Pradesh. He is the son of Gian Chand. He completed his MPhil in political science at Himachal Pradesh University, Shimla. His wife is a government employee.

== Career ==
Kumar won from Bhoranj Assembly constituency representing the Indian National Congress in the 2022 Himachal Pradesh Legislative Assembly election. He polled 24,779 votes and defeated his nearest rival, Anil Dhaman of the Bharatiya Janata Party, by a margin of 60 votes. He lost the 2017 Himachal Pradesh Legislative Assembly election on Congress ticket to Kamlesh Kumari Yadav of the Bharatiya Janata Party by a margin of 6,892 votes. He also lost to Anil Dhaman in the by-election that was caused by the death of his father Ishwar Dass Dhiman, a six time MLA.
