= Kutlehar Assembly constituency =

Legislative Assembly constituency in Himachal Pradesh State, India

Coordinates: 31.62°N 76.36°E

Kutlehar
- Constituency for the Himachal Pradesh Legislative Assembly

Constituency details
- Country: India
- Region: North India
- State: Himachal Pradesh
- District: Una
- Lok Sabha constituency: Hamirpur
- Established: 1967
- Total electors: 86,934
- Reservation: None

Member of Legislative Assembly
- 14th Himachal Pradesh Legislative Assembly
- Incumbent Vivek Sharma (Vicku)
- Party: INC
- Elected year: 2024

Kutlehar Assembly constituency is one of the 68 assembly constituencies of Himachal Pradesh a northern Indian state. Kutlehar is also part of Hamirpur, Himachal Pradesh Lok Sabha constituency. It has the territory of the former Kutlehar State.

== Members of the Legislative Assembly ==
Year	Member	Picture	Party
1967	Thakur Ranjit Singh		Independent
1972	Sarla Sharma		Indian National Congress
1977	Ramnath Sharma		Janata Party
1982	Thakur Ranjit Singh		Janata Party
1985	Ramnath Sharma		Indian National Congress
1990	Thakur Ranjit Singh		Janata Dal
1993	Ram Dass Malangar		Bharatiya Janata Party
1998	Ram Dass Malangar		Bharatiya Janata Party
2003	Virender Kanwar		Bharatiya Janata Party
2007	Virender Kanwar		Bharatiya Janata Party
2012	Virender Kanwar		Bharatiya Janata Party
2017	Virender Kanwar		Bharatiya Janata Party
2022	Davinder Kumar		Indian National Congress
2024	Vivek Sharma (Vicku) *		Indian National Congress

- By-Election

== Election results ==
=== Assembly Election 2022 ===
2022 Himachal Pradesh Legislative Assembly election: Kutlehar
Party	Candidate	Votes	%	±%
INC	Davinder Kumar Bhutto	36,636	54.84%	▲12.41
BJP	Virender Kanwar	29,057	43.49%	▼8.26
AAP	Anil Mankotia	596	0.89%	New
NOTA	Nota	378	0.57%	▲0.05
Independent	Capt. Jaidyal Singh Pal	141	0.21%	New
Margin of victory		7,579	11.34%	▲2.02
Turnout		66,808	76.85%	▲1.44
Registered electors		86,934		▲9.09
INC gain from BJP		Swing	▲3.09	

=== Assembly Election 2017 ===
2017 Himachal Pradesh Legislative Assembly election: Kutlehar
Party	Candidate	Votes	%	±%
BJP	Virender Kanwar	31,101	51.75%	▲2.47
INC	Vivek Sharma	25,495	42.42%	▼3.65
Independent	Shiv Hari Pal	1,017	1.69%	New
BSP	Manohar Lal	570	0.95%	▲0.05
Swabhiman Party	Sandeep Sharma	365	0.61%	New
Independent	Sawarn Dass	363	0.60%	New
NOTA	None of the Above	311	0.52%	New
Margin of victory		5,606	9.33%	▲6.12
Turnout		60,097	75.41%	▲2.66
Registered electors		79,693		▲9.78
BJP hold		Swing	▲2.47	

=== Assembly Election 2012 ===
2012 Himachal Pradesh Legislative Assembly election: Kutlehar
Party	Candidate	Votes	%	±%
BJP	Virender Kanwar	26,028	49.28%	▼4.64
INC	Ram Dass	24,336	46.08%	▲7.32
Himachal Swabhiman Party	Sandeep Sharma	699	1.32%	New
HLC	Sunita Devi	518	0.98%	New
BSP	Ramesh Chand	477	0.90%	▼4.87
AITC	Mahinder Pal	440	0.83%	New
Margin of victory		1,692	3.20%	▼11.97
Turnout		52,815	72.75%	▲4.07
Registered electors		72,596		▲8.96
BJP hold		Swing	▼4.64	

=== Assembly Election 2007 ===
2007 Himachal Pradesh Legislative Assembly election: Kutlehar
Party	Candidate	Votes	%	±%
BJP	Virender Kanwar	24,677	53.93%	▲25.10
INC	Ram Nath Sharma	17,734	38.75%	▲19.04
BSP	Roshan Lal Arvind	2,640	5.77%	▼9.95
LJP	Ravinder Kumar Garg	701	1.53%	New
Margin of victory		6,943	15.17%	▲6.05
Turnout		45,761	68.68%	▼3.51
Registered electors		66,629		▲12.02
BJP hold		Swing	▲25.10	

=== Assembly Election 2003 ===
2003 Himachal Pradesh Legislative Assembly election: Kutlehar
Party	Candidate	Votes	%	±%
BJP	Virender Kanwar	12,380	28.83%	▼4.75
INC	Saroj Thakur	8,464	19.71%	▼13.86
Independent	Ram Dass Malangar	8,062	18.77%	New
Independent	Mahender Pal	6,851	15.95%	New
BSP	Pt. Des Raj Modgil	6,748	15.71%	▲8.83
Independent	Ajay Kumar	436	1.02%	New
Margin of victory		3,916	9.12%	▲9.11
Turnout		42,941	72.20%	▲2.38
Registered electors		59,480		▲19.60
BJP hold		Swing	▼4.75	

=== Assembly Election 1998 ===
1998 Himachal Pradesh Legislative Assembly election: Kutlehar
Party	Candidate	Votes	%	±%
BJP	Ram Dass Malangar	11,660	33.58%	▼12.71
INC	Mahendra Pal	11,657	33.57%	▼9.69
Independent	Ram Nath Sharma	7,977	22.97%	New
BSP	Roshan Lal Arvind	2,391	6.89%	▲3.45
JD	Capt. Onkar Chand Lohia	507	1.46%	▼5.36
Independent	Desh Raj Gautam	282	0.81%	New
AIRJP	Suresh Chand	191	0.55%	New
Margin of victory		3	0.01%	▼3.02
Turnout		34,722	71.34%	▲3.02
Registered electors		49,732		▲3.59
BJP hold		Swing	▼12.71	

=== Assembly Election 1993 ===
1993 Himachal Pradesh Legislative Assembly election: Kutlehar
Party	Candidate	Votes	%	±%
BJP	Ram Dass Malangar	14,846	46.29%	New
INC	Ram Nath Sharma	13,874	43.26%	▲4.33
JD	Ranjeet Singh	2,188	6.82%	▼45.13
BSP	Harbans Singh	1,103	3.44%	New
Margin of victory		972	3.03%	▼9.98
Turnout		32,069	67.38%	▲1.13
Registered electors		48,010		▲2.40
BJP gain from JD		Swing	▼5.65	

=== Assembly Election 1990 ===
1990 Himachal Pradesh Legislative Assembly election: Kutlehar
Party	Candidate	Votes	%	±%
JD	Ranjit Singh	15,994	51.95%	New
INC	Ram Nath Sharma	11,988	38.94%	▼17.02
Independent	Mahinder Ram	1,714	5.57%	New
CPI	Satya Prasad	394	1.28%	New
INS(SCS)	Baldev Sharma	352	1.14%	New
Independent	Om Parkash Shukla	240	0.78%	New
Margin of victory		4,006	13.01%	▼3.46
Turnout		30,788	66.12%	▼4.08
Registered electors		46,887		▲32.93
JD gain from INC		Swing	▼4.01	

=== Assembly Election 1985 ===
1985 Himachal Pradesh Legislative Assembly election: Kutlehar
Party	Candidate	Votes	%	±%
INC	Ram Nath Sharma	13,766	55.96%	▲27.01
JP	Ranjit Singh	9,714	39.49%	▲6.93
Independent	Saran Dass	468	1.90%	New
Independent	Bhawan Dass	383	1.56%	New
Independent	Parkash Chand Maryana	269	1.09%	New
Margin of victory		4,052	16.47%	▲12.86
Turnout		24,600	70.43%	▲4.76
Registered electors		35,272		▲6.26
INC gain from JP		Swing	▲23.41	

=== Assembly Election 1982 ===
1982 Himachal Pradesh Legislative Assembly election: Kutlehar
Party	Candidate	Votes	%	±%
JP	Ranjit Singh	7,022	32.55%	▼21.00
INC	Ram Nath Sharma	6,244	28.95%	▼3.72
BJP	Ved Rattan Arya	6,147	28.50%	New
Independent	Gurdev Singh	1,754	8.13%	New
Independent	Partap Singh	210	0.97%	New
Independent	Dalip Singh	194	0.90%	New
Margin of victory		778	3.61%	▼17.28
Turnout		21,571	65.82%	▲4.24
Registered electors		33,194		▲9.79
JP hold		Swing	▼21.00	

=== Assembly Election 1977 ===
1977 Himachal Pradesh Legislative Assembly election: Kutlehar
Party	Candidate	Votes	%	±%
JP	Ram Nath Sharma	9,836	53.56%	New
INC	Sarla Devi	6,000	32.67%	▼29.68
Independent	Onkar Singh	1,784	9.71%	New
Independent	Jagdish Ram	209	1.14%	New
Independent	Prem Dass	160	0.87%	New
Independent	Baldev	135	0.74%	New
Independent	Amrit Ram	133	0.72%	New
Independent	Parshotam Singh	109	0.59%	New
Margin of victory		3,836	20.89%	▼3.80
Turnout		18,366	61.52%	▲1.31
Registered electors		30,234		▲4.22
JP gain from INC		Swing	▼8.79	

=== Assembly Election 1972 ===
1972 Himachal Pradesh Legislative Assembly election: Kutlehar
Party	Candidate	Votes	%	±%
INC	Sarla Sharma	10,750	62.34%	▲34.21
LRP	Ranjit Singh	6,493	37.66%	New
Margin of victory		4,257	24.69%	▲4.83
Turnout		17,243	61.00%	▲1.50
Registered electors		29,010		▲16.41
INC gain from Independent		Swing	▲14.36	

=== Assembly Election 1967 ===
1967 Himachal Pradesh Legislative Assembly election: Kutlehar
Party	Candidate	Votes	%	±%
Independent	R. Singh	6,929	47.99%	New
INC	S. Devi	4,062	28.13%	New
Independent	O. Singh	1,399	9.69%	New
Independent	U. Ram	1,337	9.26%	New
ABJS	R. Lok	566	3.92%	New
Independent	S. Parshad	146	1.01%	New
Margin of victory		2,867	19.86%	
Turnout		14,439	62.50%	
Registered electors		24,920		
Independent win (new seat)				

== See also ==
- List of constituencies of the Himachal Pradesh Legislative Assembly
- Una district
- Kutlehar
- Hamirpur, Himachal Pradesh Lok Sabha constituency
