= Dalhousie Assembly constituency =

Legislative Assembly constituency in Himachal Pradesh State, India

Coordinates: 32.54°N 75.97°E

Dalhousie
- Constituency No. 4 for the Himachal Pradesh Legislative Assembly

Constituency details
- Country: India
- Region: North India
- State: Himachal Pradesh
- District: Chamba
- Lok Sabha constituency: Kangra
- Established: 2008
- Total electors: 75,714
- Reservation: None

Member of Legislative Assembly
- 14th Himachal Pradesh Legislative Assembly
- Incumbent Dhavinder Singh
- Party: Bharatiya Janata Party
- Elected year: 2022

Dalhousie Assembly constituency is one of the 68 assembly constituencies of Himachal Pradesh a northern Indian state. Dalhousie is also part of Kangra Lok Sabha constituency.

== Members of Legislative Assembly ==
Year	Member	Picture	Party
2012	Asha Kumari		Indian National Congress
2017	Asha Kumari		Indian National Congress
2022	Dhavinder Singh		Bharatiya Janata Party

== Election results ==
=== Assembly Election 2022 ===
2022 Himachal Pradesh Legislative Assembly election: Dalhousie
Party	Candidate	Votes	%	±%
BJP	Dhavinder Singh	33,488	57.49%	▲10.63
INC	Asha Kumari	23,570	40.47%	▼7.50
NOTA	Nota	382	0.66%	▼0.47
Rashtriya Devbhumi Party	Ashok Bakaria	358	0.61%	New
Independent	Rinku	241	0.41%	New
AAP	Manish Sareen	207	0.36%	New
Margin of victory		9,918	17.03%	▲15.93
Turnout		58,246	76.93%	▲1.18
Registered electors		75,714		▲13.57
BJP gain from INC		Swing	▲9.53	

=== Assembly Election 2017 ===
2017 Himachal Pradesh Legislative Assembly election: Dalhousie
Party	Candidate	Votes	%	±%
INC	Asha Kumari	24,224	47.97%	▼7.37
BJP	Dhavinder Singh	23,668	46.87%	▲7.49
CPI	Dhian Singh	720	1.43%	▼1.41
NOTA	None of the Above	569	1.13%	New
Rashtriya Azad Manch	Virender Sharma	487	0.96%	New
Margin of victory		556	1.10%	▼14.86
Turnout		50,500	75.75%	▼0.13
Registered electors		66,669		▲9.60
INC hold		Swing	▼7.37	

=== Assembly Election 2012 ===
2012 Himachal Pradesh Legislative Assembly election: Dalhousie
Party	Candidate	Votes	%	±%
INC	Asha Kumari	25,541	55.34%	New
BJP	Renu	18,176	39.38%	New
CPI	Tilak Raj	1,310	2.84%	New
Independent	Shalender Thakur	828	1.79%	New
BSP	Paras Ram	268	0.58%	New
Margin of victory		7,365	15.96%	
Turnout		46,154	75.88%	
Registered electors		60,828		
INC win (new seat)				

== See also ==
- Dalhousie (disambiguation)
- Chamba district
- Kangra Lok Sabha constituency
