= Vinod Kumar (politician) =

Indian politician

- विनोद कुमार
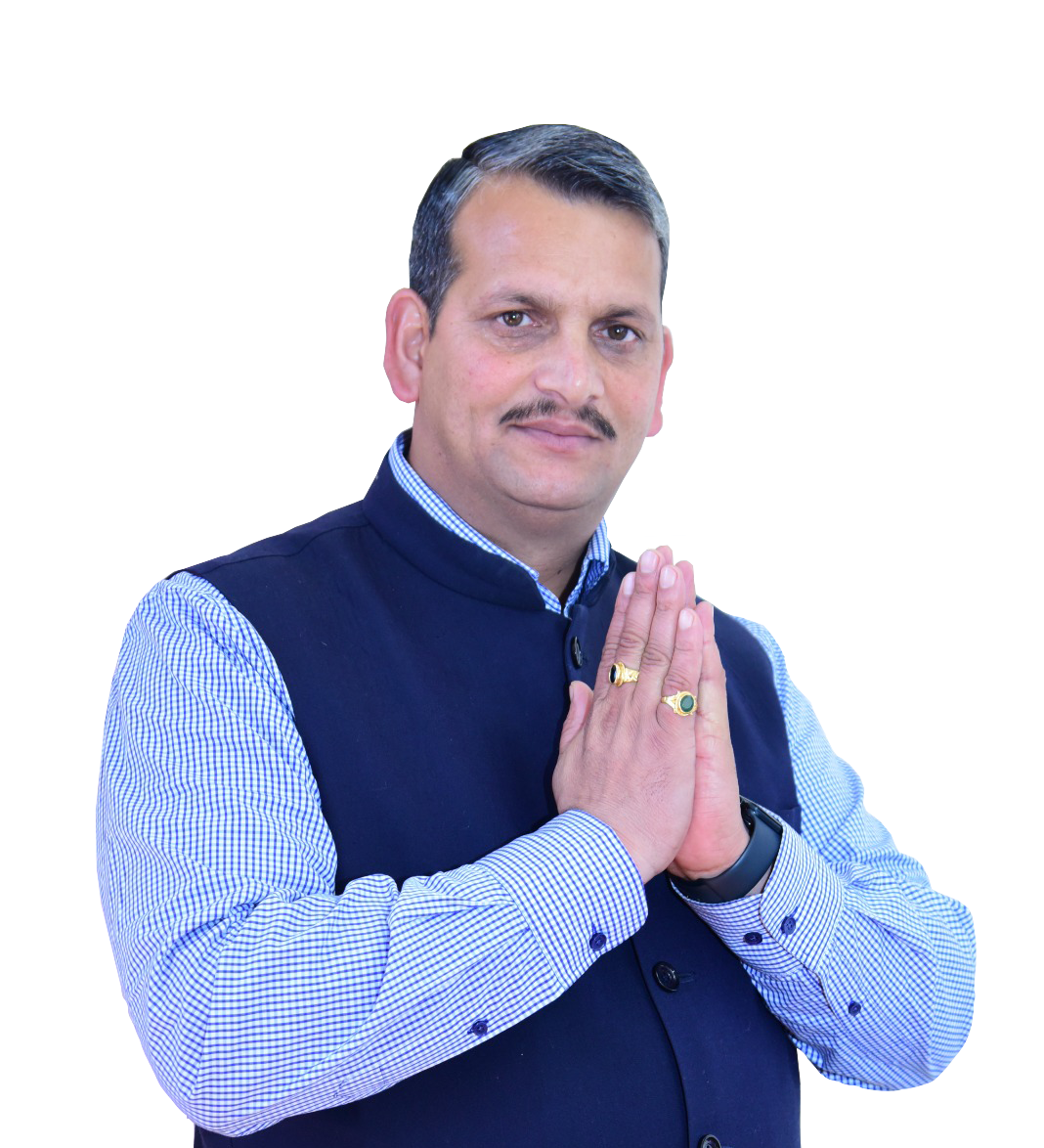

MLA Nachan Constituency Himachal Pradesh
- Incumbent
- Assumed office 2012
- President: Draupadi Murmu
- Prime Minister: Narendra Modi
- Preceded by: Dile Ram
- Constituency: Nachan Assembly constituency

Personal details
- Born: Vinod Kumar; 18 April 1980 (age 46) V.P.O Chail Chowk Chachiot, Mandi district, Himachal Pradesh, India
- Citizenship: India
- Party: Bhartiya Janata Party
- Spouse: Harsha Kumari
- Children: 2 Sons
- Parent: Kanhaiya Lal (father)
- Occupation: Politician
- Profession: Agriculturist; business person

Vinod Kumar is an Indian politician, social worker and incumbent Member of Himachal Pradesh Legislative Assembly for Nachan Assembly constituency as a member of Bharatiya Janata Party.He is serving his third term as MLA in the Himachal Pradesh Legislative Assembly, winning continuously since 2012 in the Bharatiya Janata Party Government of Himachal Pradesh.In 2022 Himachal Pradesh Legislative Assembly elections, Vinod Kumar defeated Naresh Kumar of Indian National Congress party by the margin of 8,956 votes.

== Political career ==
- 2002 - 2005, Secretary of Bharatiya Janata Party Yuva Mocha
- 2012 - 2017, Member of Legislative Assembly for Nachan Assembly constituency
- 2013 - 2017, Member of Welfare, Rules and Ethics Committees
- 2017 - 2022, 2nd term MLA for Nachan Assembly constituency
- 2018 - 2021, Member of Estimates Committee
- 2019 - 2022, Member of Privileges Committee
- 2021 - 2022, Chairman of Human Development Committee
- 2022 - Ongoing, 3rd term MLA for Nachan Assembly constituency
- 2023 - 2025, State Secretary of Bhartiya Janata Party Himachal Pradesh
- 2025 - Ongoing, State Vice President of Bharatiya Janata Party Himachal Pradesh

== Electoral performance ==
2022 Himachal Pradesh Legislative Assembly election: Nachan
Party	Candidate	Votes	%	±%
BJP	Vinod Kumar	33,200	46.40%	▼14.27
INC	Naresh Kumar	24,244	33.88%	▼1.51
Independent	Gian Chand	10,133	14.16%	New
Independent	Jasveer Singh	2,691	3.76%	New
NOTA	Nota	456	0.64%	▼0.11
Margin of victory		8,956	12.52%	▼12.76
Turnout		71,559	80.87%	▲0.02
Registered electors		88,483		▲13.76
BJP hold		Swing	▼14.27	

2017 Himachal Pradesh Legislative Assembly election: Nachan
Party	Candidate	Votes	%	±%
BJP	Vinod Kumar	38,154	60.66%	▲19.31
INC	Lal Singh Kaushal	22,258	35.39%	▼0.50
Independent	Satya Prakash	804	1.28%	New
NOTA	None of the Above	471	0.75%	New
Margin of victory		15,896	25.27%	▲19.81
Turnout		62,893	80.86%	▲2.33
Registered electors		77,783		▲10.20
BJP hold		Swing	▲19.31	

2012 Himachal Pradesh Legislative Assembly election: Nachan
Party	Candidate	Votes	%	±%
BJP	Vinod Kumar	22,924	41.36%	▼13.50
INC	Tek Chand Dogra	19,893	35.89%	▼4.73
Independent	Damodar Singh	10,861	19.60%	New
HLC	Khem Raj	749	1.35%	New
BSP	Roshan Lal Thakural	527	0.95%	▼2.63
Independent	Bimla Devi	463	0.84%	New
Margin of victory		3,031	5.47%	▼8.77
Turnout		55,427	78.53%	▲0.09
Registered electors		70,584		▲3.91
BJP hold		Swing	▼13.50	
