= Rajesh Thakur =

Indian politician

Rajesh Thakur is an Indian politician who has been a member of the 13th Himachal Pradesh Assembly from 2017. He is winner in 2017 Himachal Pradesh Legislative Assembly election in which he got 33,977 votes. He is serving as a current MLA in the Gagret Assembly constituency.

== Personal life ==
He was born on 2 June 1965 in Panaji, Goa.
