= Indora Assembly constituency =

Legislative Assembly constituency in Himachal Pradesh State, India

Coordinates: 32.14°N 75.69°E

Indora
- Constituency No. 7 for the Himachal Pradesh Legislative Assembly

Constituency details
- Country: India
- Region: North India
- State: Himachal Pradesh
- District: Kangra
- Lok Sabha constituency: Kangra
- Established: 2008
- Total electors: 91,569
- Reservation: SC

Member of Legislative Assembly
- 14th Himachal Pradesh Legislative Assembly
- Incumbent Malender Rajan
- Party: Indian National Congress
- Elected year: 2022

Indora is one of the 68 constituencies in the Himachal Pradesh Legislative Assembly of Himachal Pradesh a northern state of India. Indora is also part of Kangra Lok Sabha constituency.

== Members of the Legislative Assembly ==
Year	Member	Picture	Party
2012	Manohar Dhiman		Independent
2017	Reeta Devi		Bharatiya Janata Party
2022	Malender Rajan		Indian National Congress

== Election results ==
=== Assembly Election 2022 ===
2022 Himachal Pradesh Legislative Assembly election: Indora
Party	Candidate	Votes	%	±%
INC	Malender Rajan	30,797	45.55%	▼0.88
BJP	Reeta Devi	28,547	42.22%	▼6.02
Independent	Manohar Lal	4,442	6.57%	New
AAP	Jagdish Singh	1,474	2.18%	New
Independent	Nirmal Parshad	1,470	2.17%	New
NOTA	Nota	482	0.71%	▼0.39
BSP	Hans Raj	261	0.39%	▼1.19
Hindu Samaj Party	Laxman Dass	145	0.21%	New
Margin of victory		2,250	3.33%	▲1.52
Turnout		67,618	72.52%	▼0.77
Registered electors		93,244		▲12.83
INC gain from BJP		Swing	▼2.69	

=== Assembly Election 2017 ===
2017 Himachal Pradesh Legislative Assembly election: Indora
Party	Candidate	Votes	%	±%
BJP	Reeta Devi	29,213	48.23%	▲26.49
INC	Kamal Kishore	28,118	46.43%	▲20.14
BSP	Sushil Kumar	952	1.57%	▼0.64
NOTA	None of the Above	668	1.10%	New
Independent	Laxman Dass	502	0.83%	New
Margin of victory		1,095	1.81%	▼11.98
Turnout		60,566	73.29%	▲1.11
Registered electors		82,638		▲11.56
BJP gain from Independent		Swing	▲8.16	

=== Assembly Election 2012 ===
2012 Himachal Pradesh Legislative Assembly election: Indora
Party	Candidate	Votes	%	±%
Independent	Manohar Dhiman	21,424	40.07%	New
INC	Kamal Kishore	14,055	26.29%	New
BJP	Reeta Devi	11,624	21.74%	New
Independent	Malender Rajan	3,944	7.38%	New
BSP	Piara Singh	1,181	2.21%	New
NCP	Tilak Raj	734	1.37%	New
BBP	Sukhbinder Kumar	469	0.88%	New
Margin of victory		7,369	13.78%	
Turnout		53,463	72.18%	
Registered electors		74,073		
Independent win (new seat)				

== See also ==
- Indora
- Kangra district
- List of constituencies of Himachal Pradesh Legislative Assembly
