= Dhavinder Singh =

Indian politician

Dhavinder Singh Thakur (born 1966) is an Indian politician from Himachal Pradesh. He is a member of the Himachal Legislative Assembly from Dalhousie Assembly constituency in Chamba district. He won the 2022 Himachal Paradesh Legislative Assembly election, representing the Bharatiya Janata Party.

== Early life and education ==
Thakur is from Dalhousie, Chamba district, Himachal Pradesh. He is the son of Kirpa Ram Singh. He passed Class 10 in 1985 at Himchal Pradesh Bose Dharamshala.

== Career ==
Thakur won from Dalhousie Assembly constituency representing Bharatiya Janata Party in the 2022 Himachal Paradesh Legislative Assembly election. He polled 33,488 votes and defeated his nearest rival, Asha Kumari of the Indian National Congress, by a margin of 9,918 votes.
