= Inder Dutt Lakhanpal =

Indian politician

Member of the Himachal Pradesh Legislative Assembly
- Incumbent
- Assumed office 25 December 2012
- Preceded by: constituency established
- Constituency: Barsar

Personal details
- Born: 27 October 1962 (age 63) Shimla, Himachal Pradesh
- Party: Bharatiya Janata Party (2024–present)
- Other political affiliations: Indian National Congress (until 2024)
- Spouse: Usha Devi Lakhanpal
- Children: one son and one daughter
- Parent: Salig Ram Lakhanpal (father)

Inder Dutt Lakhanpal (born 27 October 1962) is an Indian politician, who is serving as Member of Legislative Assembly of Himachal Pradesh from Barsar constituency. Inder Dutt Lakhanpal won from Barsar Assembly Constituency in 2022 state assembly elections and 2024 assembly bypoll. He is four term Member of Himachal Pradesh Legislative Assembly.

== Early life and education ==
Inder Dutt Lakhanpal, born on 27 October 1962 in Shimla, is a dedicated social worker and politician. He is the son of Late Shri Salig Ram Lakhanpal. Inder Dutt Lakhanpal is a graduate and is married to Smt. Usha Devi Lakhanpal. The couple has one son and one daughter.

== Social Work ==
He has been actively involved in social work, serving as the Chairman of the Rogi Kalyan Samiti (NGO) (Registered), which assists poor patients. Notably, he has donated blood 68 times, showcasing his commitment to community welfare.

== Political career ==
Inder Dutt Lakhanpal's political journey includes various roles and responsibilities:

- Councilor, Municipal Corporation, Shimla, from 1997 to 2002 (elected) and 2002 to 2007 (nominated)
- Chief Organizer, Pradesh Congress Seva Dal, from 2008 to 2013
- Elected to the State Legislative Assembly in 2012 and re-elected in December 2017
- Member of the Public Undertakings, Subordinate Legislation, and Privileges Committees from January 2013 to May 2013
- Court Member, Executive Committee, HPU, from 2013 to 2015
- Chief Parliamentary Secretary from 13 May 2013 to 21 December 2017
- Member of the Public Administration and General Development Committees from 2018 to 2022

In December 2022, Inder Dutt Lakhanpal was elected for the third consecutive term. He was nominated as the Chairman of the Rural Planning Committee and is also a member of the Public Accounts and Business Advisory Committees.

In 2024, he cross-voted for the BJP candidate Harsh Mahajan in the Rajya Sabha elections. He was ultimately disqualified from the assembly but was re-elected in a by-poll in 2024 in a BJP ticket.

== Special interests ==
Apart from his political career and social work, Inder Dutt Lakhanpal has a special interest in social service.

== Languages known ==
He is fluent in Hindi and English.

== Electoral History ==
=== 2024 by-election ===
Himanchal Pradesh Legislative Assembly by-election 2024: Barsar
Party	Candidate	Votes	%	±%
BJP	Inder Dutt Lakhanpal	33,086	51.04%	▲24.81
INC	Subhash Chand	30,961	47.76%	▼0.40
NOTA	None of the Above	323	0.5%	▲0.03
Majority		2,125	3.28%	
Turnout			50%	
BJP gain from INC		Swing		

=== Assembly Election 2022 ===
2022 Himachal Pradesh Legislative Assembly election: Barsar
Party	Candidate	Votes	%	±%
INC	Inder Dutt Lakhanpal	30,293	48.16%	▲4.05
BJP	Maya Sharma	16,501	26.23%	▼17.12
Independent	Sanjeev Kumar	15,252	24.25%	New
Margin of victory		13,792	21.92%	▲21.17
Turnout		62,907	71.89%	▼0.25
Registered electors		87,505		▲8.41
INC hold		Swing	▲4.05	

=== Assembly Election 2017 ===
2017 Himachal Pradesh Legislative Assembly election: Barsar
Party	Candidate	Votes	%	±%
INC	Inder Dutt Lakhanpal	25,679	44.10%	▼6.78
BJP	Baldev Sharma	25,240	43.35%	▼2.34
Independent	Sita Ram Bhardwaj	5,181	8.90%	New
NOTA	None of the Above	464	0.80%	New
Margin of victory		439	0.75%	▼4.44
Turnout		58,226	72.14%	▲4.43
Registered electors		80,717		▲6.79
INC hold		Swing	▼6.78	

=== Assembly Election 2012 ===
2012 Himachal Pradesh Legislative Assembly election: Barsar
Party	Candidate	Votes	%	±%
INC	Inder Dutt Lakhanpal	26,041	50.89%	New
BJP	Baldev Sharma	23,383	45.69%	New
HLC	Satish Kumar	538	1.05%	New
Independent	Battan Singh	414	0.81%	New
BSP	Om Prakash Jaswal	322	0.63%	New
Margin of victory		2,658	5.19%	
Turnout		51,174	67.71%	
Registered electors		75,582		
INC win (new seat)				
