= Khub Ram =

Indian politician

Khub Ram is an Indian politician. He was member of the Bharatiya Janata Party. Ram was a member of the Himachal Pradesh Legislative Assembly from the Anni constituency in Kullu district. Later, he joined Indian National Congress ahead of 2012 Himachal Pradesh Legislative Assembly election.
