= Anni Assembly constituency =

Legislative Assembly constituency in Himachal Pradesh State, India

Coordinates: 31.43°N 77.42°E

Anni
- Constituency No. 25 for the Himachal Pradesh Legislative Assembly

Constituency details
- Country: India
- Region: North India
- State: Himachal Pradesh
- District: Kullu
- Lok Sabha constituency: Mandi
- Established: 1977
- Total electors: 88,955
- Reservation: SC

Member of Legislative Assembly
- 14th Himachal Pradesh Legislative Assembly
- Incumbent Lokender Kumar
- Party: Bharatiya Janata Party
- Elected year: 2022

Anni is one of the 68 constituencies in the Himachal Pradesh Legislative Assembly of Himachal Pradesh a northern state of India. Anni is also part of Mandi Lok Sabha constituency.

== Members of the Legislative Assembly ==
Year	Member	Picture	Party
1977	Ishar Dass		Indian National Congress
1982	Khub Ram		Bharatiya Janata Party
1985	Ishar Dass		Indian National Congress
1990	Khub Ram		Bharatiya Janata Party
1993	Ishar Dass		Indian National Congress
1998	Ishar Dass		Indian National Congress
2003	Ishar Dass		Indian National Congress
2007	Kishori Lal		Bharatiya Janata Party
2012	Khub Ram		Indian National Congress
2017	Kishori Lal		Bharatiya Janata Party
2022	Lokender Kumar		Bharatiya Janata Party

== Election results ==
=== Assembly Election 2022 ===
2022 Himachal Pradesh Legislative Assembly election: Anni
Party	Candidate	Votes	%	±%
BJP	Lokender Kumar	24,133	35.77%	▼13.53
Independent	Paras Ram	17,355	25.72%	New
INC	Bansi Lal	14,224	21.08%	▼18.56
Independent	Kishori Lal	6,893	10.22%	New
CPI(M)	Devki Nand	3,574	5.30%	▼2.29
AAP	Inder Pal	769	1.14%	New
NOTA	Nota	520	0.77%	▼0.75
Margin of victory		6,778	10.05%	▲0.39
Turnout		67,468	75.85%	▼3.89
Registered electors		88,955		▲14.43
BJP hold		Swing	▼13.53	

=== Assembly Election 2017 ===
2017 Himachal Pradesh Legislative Assembly election: Anni
Party	Candidate	Votes	%	±%
BJP	Kishori Lal	30,559	49.30%	▲13.58
INC	Paras Ram	24,576	39.65%	▲0.96
CPI(M)	Lokender Kumar	4,704	7.59%	New
NOTA	None of the Above	943	1.52%	New
Margin of victory		5,983	9.65%	▲6.68
Turnout		61,989	79.74%	▲2.26
Registered electors		77,740		▲7.56
BJP gain from INC		Swing	▲10.61	

=== Assembly Election 2012 ===
2012 Himachal Pradesh Legislative Assembly election: Anni
Party	Candidate	Votes	%	±%
INC	Khub Ram	21,664	38.69%	▼5.89
BJP	Kishori Lal	20,002	35.72%	▼11.35
HLC	Nand Lal	8,340	14.89%	New
Independent	Ishwar Dass	5,172	9.24%	New
BSP	Jai Singh	745	1.33%	▼1.26
Margin of victory		1,662	2.97%	▲0.47
Turnout		56,000	77.48%	▲5.41
Registered electors		72,274		▼10.32
INC gain from BJP		Swing	▼8.38	

=== Assembly Election 2007 ===
2007 Himachal Pradesh Legislative Assembly election: Anni
Party	Candidate	Votes	%	±%
BJP	Kishori Lal	27,341	47.07%	▲17.30
INC	Ishwar Dass	25,892	44.57%	▲0.11
CPI(M)	Ramesh Chand	3,323	5.72%	New
BSP	Gurmel Singh	1,503	2.59%	New
Margin of victory		1,449	2.49%	▼12.20
Turnout		58,088	72.08%	▲0.87
Registered electors		80,593		▲11.05
BJP gain from INC		Swing	▲2.60	

=== Assembly Election 2003 ===
2003 Himachal Pradesh Legislative Assembly election: Anni
Party	Candidate	Votes	%	±%
INC	Ishwar Dass	22,978	44.46%	▼6.80
BJP	Tej Ram	15,385	29.77%	▼16.17
Independent	Khub Ram Anand	8,544	16.53%	New
HVC	Diwan Singh	1,881	3.64%	▲1.90
Independent	Roop Dass	1,041	2.01%	New
Independent	Balak Ram	801	1.55%	New
SP	Balak Ram Joshi	642	1.24%	New
Independent	Kehar Singh	405	0.78%	New
Margin of victory		7,593	14.69%	▲9.37
Turnout		51,677	71.26%	▲1.36
Registered electors		72,572		▲9.27
INC hold		Swing	▼6.80	

=== Assembly Election 1998 ===
1998 Himachal Pradesh Legislative Assembly election: Anni
Party	Candidate	Votes	%	±%
INC	Ishwar Dass	23,780	51.27%	▲0.36
BJP	Tej Ram	21,310	45.94%	▲0.31
HVC	Khub Ram	805	1.74%	New
CPI(M)	Teja Singh	491	1.06%	New
Margin of victory		2,470	5.32%	▲0.05
Turnout		46,386	70.55%	▲4.48
Registered electors		66,414		▲8.14
INC hold		Swing	▲0.36	

=== Assembly Election 1993 ===
1993 Himachal Pradesh Legislative Assembly election: Anni
Party	Candidate	Votes	%	±%
INC	Ishwar Dass	20,436	50.90%	▲22.11
BJP	Tej Ram	18,320	45.63%	▼21.78
CPI	Talku Ram	846	2.11%	▼1.69
BSP	Jiya Lal	303	0.75%	New
Independent	Bhag Chand	242	0.60%	New
Margin of victory		2,116	5.27%	▼33.35
Turnout		40,147	65.84%	▲5.56
Registered electors		61,417		▲10.51
INC gain from BJP		Swing	▼16.51	

=== Assembly Election 1990 ===
1990 Himachal Pradesh Legislative Assembly election: Anni
Party	Candidate	Votes	%	±%
BJP	Khub Ram	22,407	67.41%	▲24.91
INC	Diwan Singh	9,569	28.79%	▼27.68
CPI	Talku Ram	1,262	3.80%	▲2.77
Margin of victory		12,838	38.62%	▲24.66
Turnout		33,238	60.36%	▼4.12
Registered electors		55,575		▲24.57
BJP gain from INC		Swing		

=== Assembly Election 1985 ===
1985 Himachal Pradesh Legislative Assembly election: Anni
Party	Candidate	Votes	%	±%
INC	Ishwar Dass	16,106	56.47%	▲12.04
BJP	Khub Ram	12,123	42.51%	▼11.89
CPI	Talku Ram	292	1.02%	▼0.15
Margin of victory		3,983	13.97%	▲4.01
Turnout		28,521	64.68%	▲1.46
Registered electors		44,614		▲3.84
INC gain from BJP		Swing		

=== Assembly Election 1982 ===
1982 Himachal Pradesh Legislative Assembly election: Anni
Party	Candidate	Votes	%	±%
BJP	Khub Ram	14,599	54.39%	New
INC	Ishwar Dass	11,926	44.43%	▲5.53
CPI	Talku Ram	316	1.18%	New
Margin of victory		2,673	9.96%	▲2.37
Turnout		26,841	63.28%	▲23.25
Registered electors		42,964		▲17.63
BJP gain from INC		Swing	▲15.49	

=== Assembly Election 1977 ===
1977 Himachal Pradesh Legislative Assembly election: Anni
Party	Candidate	Votes	%	±%
INC	Ishwar Dass	5,573	38.90%	New
JP	Sharda Devi	4,486	31.31%	New
Independent	Paru Dass	3,050	21.29%	New
Independent	Talku Ram	1,218	8.50%	New
Margin of victory		1,087	7.59%	
Turnout		14,327	39.75%	
Registered electors		36,524		
INC win (new seat)				

== See also ==
- Kullu district
- List of constituencies of Himachal Pradesh Legislative Assembly
