= Bhoranj Assembly constituency =

Legislative Assembly constituency in Himachal Pradesh State, India

Coordinates: 31.34°N 76.77°E

Bhoranj
- Constituency No. 36 for the Himachal Pradesh Legislative Assembly

Constituency details
- Country: India
- Region: North India
- State: Himachal Pradesh
- District: Hamirpur
- Lok Sabha constituency: Hamirpur
- Established: 2008
- Total electors: 82,738
- Reservation: SC

Member of Legislative Assembly
- 14th Himachal Pradesh Legislative Assembly
- Incumbent Suresh Kumar
- Party: Indian National Congress
- Elected year: 2022

Bhoranj Assembly constituency is one of the 68 assembly constituencies of Himachal Pradesh a northern Indian state. It is also part of Hamirpur, Himachal Pradesh Lok Sabha constituency.

== Members of the Legislative Assembly ==
Year	Member	Party
2012	Ishwar Dass Dhiman	Bharatiya Janata Party
2017 By-election	Dr. Anil Dhiman	Bharatiya Janata Party
2017	Kamlesh Kumari Yadav	Bharatiya Janata Party
2022	Suresh Kumar	Indian National Congress

== Election results ==
=== Assembly Election 2022 ===
2022 Himachal Pradesh Legislative Assembly election: Bhoranj
Party	Candidate	Votes	%	±%
INC	Suresh Kumar	24,779	43.16%	▲2.38
BJP	Dr. Anil Dhiman	24,719	43.05%	▼11.06
Independent	Pawan Kumar	6,861	11.95%	New
AAP	Rajni Kaushal	463	0.81%	New
BSP	Jarnail Singh	302	0.53%	▼0.42
NOTA	Nota	293	0.51%	▼0.19
Margin of victory		60	0.10%	▼13.23
Turnout		57,417	69.40%	▲1.13
Registered electors		82,738		▲9.31
INC gain from BJP		Swing	▼10.96	

=== Assembly Election 2017 ===
2017 Himachal Pradesh Legislative Assembly election: Bhoranj
Party	Candidate	Votes	%	±%
BJP	Kamlesh Kumari Yadav	27,961	54.12%	▲1.96
INC	Suresh Kumar	21,069	40.78%	▲6.32
BSP	Praveen Kaushal	491	0.95%	New
NOTA	None of the Above	362	0.70%	New
Independent	Dhani Ram Shukla	308	0.60%	New
Margin of victory		6,892	13.34%	▼4.36
Turnout		51,669	68.26%	▲6.79
Registered electors		75,689		▼0.68
BJP hold		Swing	▲1.96	

=== Assembly By-election 2017 ===
2017 Himachal Pradesh Legislative Assembly by-election: Bhoranj
Party	Candidate	Votes	%	±%
BJP	Dr. Anil Dhiman	24,434	52.16%	▼7.07
INC	Parmila Devi	16,144	34.46%	▼2.19
Independent	Pawan Kumar	4,630	9.88%	New
Independent	Dr. Ramesh Chand Dogra	974	2.08%	New
Independent	Kusum Azad	403	0.86%	New
NOTA	None of the Above	263	0.56%	New
Margin of victory		8,290	17.70%	▼4.88
Turnout		46,848	61.47%	▼3.13
Registered electors		76,209		▲6.72
BJP hold		Swing	▼7.07	

=== Assembly Election 2012 ===
2012 Himachal Pradesh Legislative Assembly election: Bhoranj
Party	Candidate	Votes	%	±%
BJP	Ishwar Dass Dhiman	27,323	59.23%	New
INC	Ramesh Chand	16,908	36.65%	New
HLC	Pawan Kumar	891	1.93%	New
Independent	Dhani Ram Shukla	430	0.93%	New
BSP	Lal Singh Mastana	363	0.79%	New
Margin of victory		10,415	22.58%	
Turnout		46,131	64.60%	
Registered electors		71,411		
BJP win (new seat)				

== See also ==
- Bhoranj
- Hamirpur district
- Hamirpur, Himachal Pradesh Lok Sabha constituency
