= Rohru Assembly constituency =

Legislative Assembly constituency in Himachal Pradesh State, India

Coordinates: 31.2°N 77.75°E

Rohru
- Constituency No. 67 for the Himachal Pradesh Legislative Assembly

Constituency details
- Country: India
- Region: North India
- State: Himachal Pradesh
- District: Shimla
- Lok Sabha constituency: Shimla
- Established: 1951
- Total electors: 75,253
- Reservation: SC

Member of Legislative Assembly
- 14th Himachal Pradesh Legislative Assembly
- Incumbent Mohan Lal Brakta
- Party: Indian National Congress
- Elected year: 2022

Rohru is one of the 68 constituencies in the Himachal Pradesh Legislative Assembly of Himachal Pradesh a northern state of India. Rohru is also part of Shimla Lok Sabha constituency.

== Members of Legislative Assembly ==
Year	Member	Picture	Party
1951	Padam Dev		Indian National Congress
Assembly did not exist
1967	Padam Dev		Indian National Congress
1972	Amrit Singh Rathore		Indian National Congress
1977	Satya Dev Bushahri		Janata Party
1982	Satya Dev Bushahri		Indian National Congress
1985	Nehar Singh		Indian National Congress
1990	Virbhadra Singh		Indian National Congress
1993	Virbhadra Singh		Indian National Congress
1998	Virbhadra Singh		Indian National Congress
2003	Virbhadra Singh		Indian National Congress
2007	Virbhadra Singh		Indian National Congress
2009 (Note: by-election)	Khushi Ram Balnahta		Bharatiya Janata Party
2012	Mohan Lal Brakta		Indian National Congress
2017	Mohan Lal Brakta		Indian National Congress
2022	Mohan Lal Brakta		Indian National Congress

== Election results ==
=== Assembly Election 2022 ===
2022 Himachal Pradesh Legislative Assembly election: Rohru
Party	Candidate	Votes	%	±%
INC	Mohan Lal Brakta	34,327	61.90%	▲4.48
BJP	Shashi Bala	14,988	27.03%	▼11.85
Independent	Rajender Singh	3,597	6.49%	New
AAP	Ashwani Kumar	1,400	2.52%	New
BSP	Prakash Andta	520	0.94%	▲0.12
NOTA	Nota	413	0.74%	▼0.31
Rashtriya Devbhumi Party	Narender Singh	209	0.38%	New
Margin of victory		19,339	34.87%	▲16.33
Turnout		55,454	73.69%	▲0.33
Registered electors		75,253		▲8.82
INC hold		Swing	▲4.48	

=== Assembly Election 2017 ===
2017 Himachal Pradesh Legislative Assembly election: Rohru
Party	Candidate	Votes	%	±%
INC	Mohan Lal Brakta	29,134	57.43%	▼19.47
BJP	Shashi Bala	19,726	38.88%	▲25.38
NOTA	None of the Above	535	1.05%	New
BSP	Shurvir Singh	415	0.82%	▼1.25
Swabhiman Party	Narayan Chand	317	0.62%	New
Margin of victory		9,408	18.54%	▼44.85
Turnout		50,733	73.36%	▲4.43
Registered electors		69,155		▲6.34
INC hold		Swing	▼19.47	

=== Assembly Election 2012 ===
2012 Himachal Pradesh Legislative Assembly election: Rohru
Party	Candidate	Votes	%	±%
INC	Mohan Lal Brakta	34,465	76.89%	▲16.33
BJP	Balak Ram Negi.	6,050	13.50%	▼18.60
HLC	Rattan Dass	1,809	4.04%	New
BSP	Prakash Andta	925	2.06%	▼1.66
LJP	Balwan Singh	807	1.80%	▼1.79
Independent	Badri Prasad	681	1.52%	New
Margin of victory		28,415	63.39%	▲34.93
Turnout		44,823	68.93%	▼0.81
Registered electors		65,029		▼8.69
INC hold		Swing	▲16.33	

=== Assembly Election 2007 ===
2007 Himachal Pradesh Legislative Assembly election: Rohru
Party	Candidate	Votes	%	±%
INC	Virbhadra Singh	30,079	60.56%	▼7.47
BJP	Khushi Ram Balnath	15,942	32.10%	▲0.13
BSP	Randhir Ranta	1,849	3.72%	New
LJP	Goverdhan Singh Chauhan	1,785	3.59%	New
Margin of victory		14,137	28.46%	▼7.60
Turnout		49,665	69.74%	▼6.32
Registered electors		71,215		▲12.98
INC hold		Swing	▼7.47	

=== Assembly Election 2003 ===
2003 Himachal Pradesh Legislative Assembly election: Rohru
Party	Candidate	Votes	%	±%
INC	Virbhadra Singh	32,617	68.03%	▼12.88
BJP	Khushi Ram Balnath	15,328	31.97%	▲13.96
Margin of victory		17,289	36.06%	▼26.84
Turnout		47,945	76.16%	▲3.32
Registered electors		63,033		▲10.30
INC hold		Swing		

=== Assembly Election 1998 ===
1998 Himachal Pradesh Legislative Assembly election: Rohru
Party	Candidate	Votes	%	±%
INC	Virbhadra Singh	33,637	80.91%	▲3.81
BJP	Khushi Ram Balnath	7,489	18.01%	▼2.08
JD	Goverdhan Singh Chauhan	297	0.71%	▼0.44
Margin of victory		26,148	62.90%	▲5.89
Turnout		41,571	73.97%	▲1.97
Registered electors		57,149		▲15.60
INC hold		Swing		

=== Assembly Election 1993 ===
1993 Himachal Pradesh Legislative Assembly election: Rohru
Party	Candidate	Votes	%	±%
INC	Virbhadra Singh	26,976	77.10%	▼11.96
BJP	Khushi Ram Balnath	7,030	20.09%	New
Independent	Bihari Lal	509	1.45%	New
JD	Goverdhan Singh Chauhan	405	1.16%	▼8.44
Margin of victory		19,946	57.01%	▼22.45
Turnout		34,988	71.68%	▲4.05
Registered electors		49,435		▲6.44
INC hold		Swing	▼11.96	

=== Assembly Election 1990 ===
1990 Himachal Pradesh Legislative Assembly election: Rohru
Party	Candidate	Votes	%	±%
INC	Virbhadra Singh	27,602	89.06%	▲2.03
JD	Satya Dev Bushehari	2,976	9.60%	New
Independent	Dewal Ram Nagi	415	1.34%	New
Margin of victory		24,626	79.46%	▲5.40
Turnout		30,993	67.25%	▼0.77
Registered electors		46,445		▲22.45
INC hold		Swing		

=== Assembly Election 1985 ===
1985 Himachal Pradesh Legislative Assembly election: Rohru
Party	Candidate	Votes	%	±%
INC	Nehar Singh	22,282	87.03%	▲36.84
BJP	Partap Singh Mukhiya	3,321	12.97%	▼15.49
Margin of victory		18,961	74.06%	▲52.33
Turnout		25,603	68.50%	▲1.21
Registered electors		37,930		▲6.14
INC hold		Swing		

=== Assembly Election 1982 ===
1982 Himachal Pradesh Legislative Assembly election: Rohru
Party	Candidate	Votes	%	±%
INC	Satya Dev Bushehari	11,890	50.19%	▲45.52
BJP	Pratap Singh Mukhia	6,743	28.46%	New
Independent	Bhagat Chand	2,927	12.36%	New
JP	Girdhari Lal	1,622	6.85%	▼48.35
Independent	Dhan Sukh Chauhan	507	2.14%	New
Margin of victory		5,147	21.73%	▲6.65
Turnout		23,689	67.84%	▲8.57
Registered electors		35,736		▲16.37
INC gain from JP		Swing	▼5.01	

=== Assembly Election 1977 ===
1977 Himachal Pradesh Legislative Assembly election: Rohru
Party	Candidate	Votes	%	±%
JP	Satya Dev	9,785	55.20%	New
Independent	Nehar Singh	7,113	40.13%	New
INC	Amrit Singh Rathore	828	4.67%	▼40.66
Margin of victory		2,672	15.07%	▲9.62
Turnout		17,726	59.17%	▲23.04
Registered electors		30,710		▲5.23
JP gain from INC		Swing	▲9.87	

=== Assembly Election 1972 ===
1972 Himachal Pradesh Legislative Assembly election: Rohru
Party	Candidate	Votes	%	±%
INC	Amrit Singh Rathore	4,588	45.33%	▼6.17
INC(O)	Satya Dev Bushahri	4,036	39.88%	New
Independent	Balbir Singh Dhawan	1,497	14.79%	New
Margin of victory		552	5.45%	▼16.71
Turnout		10,121	35.65%	▼12.83
Registered electors		29,184		▲8.35
INC hold		Swing	▼6.17	

=== Assembly Election 1967 ===
1967 Himachal Pradesh Legislative Assembly election: Rohru
Party	Candidate	Votes	%	±%
INC	P. Dev	6,590	51.50%	▲17.66
Independent	Nehar Singh	3,754	29.34%	New
Independent	S. Ram	1,554	12.15%	New
Independent	G. Das	897	7.01%	New
Margin of victory		2,836	22.16%	▲11.18
Turnout		12,795	50.20%	▲13.74
Registered electors		26,934		▲121.90
INC hold		Swing	▲17.66	

=== Assembly Election 1952 ===
1952 Himachal Pradesh Legislative Assembly election: Rohru
Party	Candidate	Votes	%	±%
INC	Padam Dev	1,387	33.85%	New
SCF	Noopa	937	22.86%	New
Independent	Rameshwar Dass	665	16.23%	New
KMPP	Sanam Ram	576	14.06%	New
ABJS	Gian Singh	533	13.01%	New
Margin of victory		450	10.98%	
Turnout		4,098	33.76%	
Registered electors		12,138		
INC win (new seat)				

== See also ==
- Rohru
- Shimla district
- List of constituencies of Himachal Pradesh Legislative Assembly
