= Dehra Assembly constituency =

Legislative Assembly constituency in Himachal Pradesh State, India

Coordinates: 31.58°N 76.71°E

Dehra
- Constituency No. 10 for the Himachal Pradesh Legislative Assembly

Constituency details
- Country: India
- Region: North India
- State: Himachal Pradesh
- District: Kangra
- Lok Sabha constituency: Hamirpur
- Established: 1967
- Total electors: 85,263
- Reservation: None

Member of Legislative Assembly
- 14th Himachal Pradesh Legislative Assembly
- Incumbent Kamlesh Thakur
- Party: Indian National Congress
- Elected year: 2024

Dehra (Vidhan Sabha or Assembly constituency & AC No.10) is one of the 68 assembly constituencies of Himachal Pradesh, a state in northern India. The town, municipality, and tehsil of Dehhra are part of this constituency. The assembly constituency is a part of the Hamirpur, Himachal Pradesh Lok Sabha constituency.

== Members of Legislative Assembly ==
Year	Member	Party
1967	V. Bhushan	Independent
2012	Ravinder Singh Ravi	Bharatiya Janata Party
2017	Hoshyar Singh	Independent
2022	Hoshyar Singh	Independent
2024★	Kamlesh Thakur	Indian National Congress

★By election

== Election results ==
=== 2024 by-election ===
Himachal Pradesh Legislative Assembly by-election 2024: Dehra
Party	Candidate	Votes	%	±%
INC	Kamlesh Thakur	32,737	57.94%	▲26.38
BJP	Hoshyar Singh	23,338	41.30%	▲13.68
Independent	Sulekha Chaudhary	171	0.30%	N/A
NOTA	None of the Above	150	0.27%	▼0.51
Independent	Arun Ankesh Syal	67	0.12%	N/A
Independent	Adv. Sanjay Sharma	43	0.08%	N/A
Majority		9,399	16.63%	
Turnout		56,506		
INC gain from Independent		Swing		

=== Assembly Election 2022 ===
2022 Himachal Pradesh Legislative Assembly election: Dehra
Party	Candidate	Votes	%	±%
Independent	Hoshyar Singh	22,997	37.96%	▼5.64
INC	Dr. Rajesh Sharma	19,120	31.56%	▲16.63
BJP	Ramesh Chand	16,730	27.62%	▼8.93
Independent	Varun Kumar	560	0.92%	New
AAP	Manish Kumar	483	0.80%	New
NOTA	Nota	472	0.78%	▼0.85
BSP	Harbans Singh	213	0.35%	New
Margin of victory		3,877	6.40%	▼0.65
Turnout		60,575	71.04%	▼1.51
Registered electors		85,263		▲11.42
Independent hold		Swing	▼5.63	

=== Assembly Election 2017 ===
2017 Himachal Pradesh Legislative Assembly election: Dehra
Party	Candidate	Votes	%	±%
Independent	Hoshyar Singh	24,206	43.60%	New
BJP	Ravinder Singh Ravi	20,292	36.55%	▼15.36
INC	Viplove Thakur	8,289	14.93%	▼1.28
NOTA	None of the Above	903	1.63%	New
Bhartiya Himachal Jan Vikas Party	Manohar Lal Sharma	393	0.71%	New
Independent	Sudesh Choudhary	337	0.61%	New
Margin of victory		3,914	7.05%	▼25.40
Turnout		55,519	72.55%	▲5.63
Registered electors		76,522		▲8.66
Independent gain from BJP		Swing	▼8.31	

=== Assembly Election 2012 ===
2012 Himachal Pradesh Legislative Assembly election: Dehra
Party	Candidate	Votes	%	±%
BJP	Ravinder Singh Ravi	24,463	51.91%	New
Independent	Yog Raj	9,170	19.46%	New
INC	Rajinder Singh Rana	7,639	16.21%	▼16.00
BSP	Hari Om	1,603	3.40%	New
Independent	Harpal Singh Jaswal	838	1.78%	New
Independent	Rajesh Kumar	689	1.46%	New
Independent	Onkar Chand Thakur	387	0.82%	New
Independent	Vijay Kumar	361	0.77%	New
Independent	Satish Kumar	360	0.76%	New
AITC	Raj Kumar	326	0.69%	New
Independent	Ashwani Kumar	288	0.61%	New
Margin of victory		15,293	32.45%	▲29.89
Turnout		47,130	66.92%	▲13.02
Registered electors		70,424		▲183.73
BJP gain from Independent		Swing	▲17.13	

=== Assembly Election 1967 ===
1967 Himachal Pradesh Legislative Assembly election: Dehra
Party	Candidate	Votes	%	±%
Independent	V. Bhushan	4,653	34.78%	New
INC	M. Ram	4,310	32.21%	New
Independent	G. Ram	2,902	21.69%	New
Independent	S. Singh	1,038	7.76%	New
ABJS	K. Ram	477	3.57%	New
Margin of victory		343	2.56%	
Turnout		13,380	57.38%	
Registered electors		24,821		
Independent win (new seat)				

== See also ==
- Kangra district
- Hamirpur, Himachal Pradesh Lok Sabha constituency
