= Gagret Assembly constituency =

Legislative Assembly constituency in Himachal Pradesh State, India

Coordinates: 31.66°N 76.06°E

Gagret
- Constituency No. 42 for the Himachal Pradesh Legislative Assembly

Constituency details
- Country: India
- Region: North India
- State: Himachal Pradesh
- District: Una
- Lok Sabha constituency: Hamirpur
- Established: 1967
- Total electors: 84,517
- Reservation: None

Member of Legislative Assembly
- 14th Himachal Pradesh Legislative Assembly
- Incumbent Rakesh Kalia
- Party: INC
- Elected year: 2024

Gagret Assembly constituency is one of the 68 constituencies in the Himachal Pradesh Legislative Assembly of Himachal Pradesh a northern state of India. Gagret is also part of Hamirpur, Himachal Pradesh Lok Sabha constituency.

== Members of Legislative Assembly ==
| Year | Member | Picture | Party |
|---|---|---|---|
| 1967 | Mehnga Singh | | Indian National Congress |
| 1972 | Mehnga Singh | | Indian National Congress |
| 1977 | Sadhu Ram | | Janata Party |
| 1982 | Sadhu Ram | | Bharatiya Janata Party |
| 1985 | Milkhi Ram | | Indian National Congress |
| 1990 | Sadhu Ram | | Bharatiya Janata Party |
| 1993 | Kuldeep Kumar | | Indian National Congress |
| 1998 | Kuldeep Kumar | | Indian National Congress |
| 2003 | Kuldeep Kumar | | Indian National Congress |
| 2007 | Balbir Singh | | Bharatiya Janata Party |
| 2012 | Rakesh Kalia | | Indian National Congress |
| 2017 | Rajesh Thakur | | Bharatiya Janata Party |
| 2022 | Chaitanya Sharma | | Indian National Congress |
| 2024 | Rakesh Kalia | | Indian National Congress |

- By-Election

== Election results ==
=== Assembly Election 2022 ===
2022 Himachal Pradesh Legislative Assembly election: Gagret
| Party | Candidate | Votes | % | ±% |
|---|---|---|---|---|
| INC | Chaitanya Sharma | 40,767 | 61.15% | ▲20.35 |
| BJP | Rajesh Thakur | 25,082 | 37.62% | ▼18.60 |
| NOTA | Nota | 404 | 0.61% | ▼0.04 |
| AAP | Manohar Lal Dadwal | 145 | 0.22% | New |
| Rashtriya Devbhumi Party | Vinod Dadwal (Pintu) | 125 | 0.19% | New |
| BSP | Lekh Raj Katnoria | 97 | 0.15% | New |
| Himachal Jan Kranti Party | Raghubir Singh | 45 | 0.07% | New |
| Margin of victory | | 15,685 | 23.53% | ▲8.10 |
| Turnout | | 66,665 | 78.88% | ▼0.07 |
| Registered electors | | 84,517 | | ▲10.42 |
| INC gain from BJP | | Swing | ▲4.92 | |

=== Assembly Election 2017 ===
2017 Himachal Pradesh Legislative Assembly election: Gagret
| Party | Candidate | Votes | % | ±% |
|---|---|---|---|---|
| BJP | Rajesh Thakur | 33,977 | 56.23% | ▲19.67 |
| INC | Rakesh Kalia | 24657 | 40.80% | ▼5.34 |
| NOTA | None of the Above | 392 | 0.65% | New |
| Independent | Subhash Sharma | 379 | 0.63% | New |
| Margin of victory | | 9,320 | 15.42% | ▲5.84 |
| Turnout | | 60,427 | 78.95% | ▲5.09 |
| Registered electors | | 76,540 | | ▲10.62 |
| BJP gain from INC | | Swing | ▲10.08 | |

=== Assembly Election 2012 ===
2012 Himachal Pradesh Legislative Assembly election: Gagret
| Party | Candidate | Votes | % | ±% |
|---|---|---|---|---|
| INC | Rakesh Kalia | 23,581 | 46.14% | ▲1.48 |
| BJP | Sushil Kumar Kalia | 18,684 | 36.56% | ▼14.68 |
| Independent | Raman Kumar Jaswal | 5,245 | 10.26% | New |
| BSP | Gurbux Rai Thakur | 997 | 1.95% | ▼0.70 |
| HLC | Narinder Singh Parmar | 789 | 1.54% | New |
| Independent | Lakshmi Jariyal | 752 | 1.47% | New |
| Himachal Swabhiman Party | Krishan Gopal | 323 | 0.63% | New |
| Margin of victory | | 4,897 | 9.58% | ▲3.00 |
| Turnout | | 51,103 | 73.86% | ▲1.02 |
| Registered electors | | 69,189 | | ▲8.00 |
| INC gain from BJP | | Swing | ▼5.10 | |

=== Assembly Election 2007 ===
2007 Himachal Pradesh Legislative Assembly election: Gagret
| Party | Candidate | Votes | % | ±% |
|---|---|---|---|---|
| BJP | Balbir Singh | 23,914 | 51.25% | ▲12.05 |
| INC | Kuldeep Kumar | 20,843 | 44.66% | ▼11.99 |
| BSP | Lekh Raj Katnoria | 1,238 | 2.65% | ▲1.84 |
| Independent | Mehar Chand | 414 | 0.89% | New |
| Margin of victory | | 3,071 | 6.58% | ▼10.87 |
| Turnout | | 46,666 | 72.84% | ▼0.74 |
| Registered electors | | 64,063 | | ▲14.64 |
| BJP gain from INC | | Swing | ▼5.41 | |

=== Assembly Election 2003 ===
2003 Himachal Pradesh Legislative Assembly election: Gagret
| Party | Candidate | Votes | % | ±% |
|---|---|---|---|---|
| INC | Kuldeep Kumar | 23,297 | 56.65% | ▲4.12 |
| BJP | Balbir Singh | 16,119 | 39.20% | ▼3.10 |
| ABHM | Tarsem Lal | 524 | 1.27% | New |
| HVC | Prem Dass Bhardwaj | 493 | 1.20% | ▼0.89 |
| NCP | Parkash Chand Dhiman | 353 | 0.86% | New |
| BSP | Lekh Raj Katnoria | 336 | 0.82% | ▼1.46 |
| Margin of victory | | 7,178 | 17.46% | ▲7.22 |
| Turnout | | 41,122 | 73.72% | ▲3.11 |
| Registered electors | | 55,881 | | ▲15.05 |
| INC hold | | Swing | ▲4.12 | |

=== Assembly Election 1998 ===
1998 Himachal Pradesh Legislative Assembly election: Gagret
| Party | Candidate | Votes | % | ±% |
|---|---|---|---|---|
| INC | Kuldeep Kumar | 17,984 | 52.54% | ▼6.38 |
| BJP | Satpaul | 14,480 | 42.30% | ▲6.83 |
| BSP | Dharampaul | 781 | 2.28% | ▼2.33 |
| HVC | Kashmiri Devi | 714 | 2.09% | New |
| JD | Mela Singh | 193 | 0.56% | ▼0.44 |
| Margin of victory | | 3,504 | 10.24% | ▼13.22 |
| Turnout | | 34,231 | 71.48% | ▲7.15 |
| Registered electors | | 48,572 | | ▲0.36 |
| INC hold | | Swing | ▼6.38 | |

=== Assembly Election 1993 ===
1993 Himachal Pradesh Legislative Assembly election: Gagret
| Party | Candidate | Votes | % | ±% |
|---|---|---|---|---|
| INC | Kuldeep Kumar | 18,059 | 58.92% | ▲23.34 |
| BJP | Sadhu Ram | 10,871 | 35.47% | ▼25.76 |
| BSP | Usha Devi | 1,412 | 4.61% | ▲2.38 |
| JD | Capt. Mela Singh | 308 | 1.00% | New |
| Margin of victory | | 7,188 | 23.45% | ▼2.20 |
| Turnout | | 30,650 | 64.10% | ▲0.01 |
| Registered electors | | 48,400 | | ▲5.32 |
| INC gain from BJP | | Swing | ▼2.31 | |

=== Assembly Election 1990 ===
1990 Himachal Pradesh Legislative Assembly election: Gagret
| Party | Candidate | Votes | % | ±% |
|---|---|---|---|---|
| BJP | Sadhu Ram | 17,815 | 61.23% | ▲23.73 |
| INC | Kuldeep Kumar | 10,351 | 35.58% | ▼24.99 |
| BSP | Balwant Singh | 649 | 2.23% | New |
| Margin of victory | | 7,464 | 25.65% | ▲2.58 |
| Turnout | | 29,096 | 63.88% | ▲1.04 |
| Registered electors | | 45,956 | | ▲26.86 |
| BJP gain from INC | | Swing | | |

=== Assembly Election 1985 ===
1985 Himachal Pradesh Legislative Assembly election: Gagret
| Party | Candidate | Votes | % | ±% |
|---|---|---|---|---|
| INC | Milkhi Ram | 13,664 | 60.57% | ▲14.60 |
| BJP | Sadhu Ram | 8,460 | 37.50% | ▼15.30 |
| Independent | Ram Chand | 205 | 0.91% | New |
| Independent | Kuldip Singh Kaushal | 189 | 0.84% | New |
| Margin of victory | | 5,204 | 23.07% | ▲16.24 |
| Turnout | | 22,559 | 63.01% | ▼1.89 |
| Registered electors | | 36,225 | | ▲7.88 |
| INC gain from BJP | | Swing | ▲7.77 | |

=== Assembly Election 1982 ===
1982 Himachal Pradesh Legislative Assembly election: Gagret
| Party | Candidate | Votes | % | ±% |
|---|---|---|---|---|
| BJP | Sadhu Ram | 11,377 | 52.80% | New |
| INC | Mehnga Singh | 9,906 | 45.97% | ▲1.72 |
| JP | Gurdas Ram | 265 | 1.23% | ▼46.59 |
| Margin of victory | | 1,471 | 6.83% | ▲3.26 |
| Turnout | | 21,548 | 64.99% | ▲16.27 |
| Registered electors | | 33,580 | | ▲2.29 |
| BJP gain from JP | | Swing | ▲4.98 | |

=== Assembly Election 1977 ===
1977 Himachal Pradesh Legislative Assembly election: Gagret
| Party | Candidate | Votes | % | ±% |
|---|---|---|---|---|
| JP | Sadhu Ram | 7,520 | 47.82% | New |
| INC | Milkhi Ram | 6,959 | 44.25% | ▼31.93 |
| Independent | Sandhya Dass | 963 | 6.12% | New |
| Independent | Khushi Ram | 283 | 1.80% | New |
| Margin of victory | | 561 | 3.57% | ▼57.42 |
| Turnout | | 15,725 | 48.74% | ▲1.56 |
| Registered electors | | 32,828 | | ▲6.93 |
| JP gain from INC | | Swing | ▼28.36 | |

=== Assembly Election 1972 ===
1972 Himachal Pradesh Legislative Assembly election: Gagret
| Party | Candidate | Votes | % | ±% |
|---|---|---|---|---|
| INC | Mehnga Singh | 10,838 | 76.18% | ▲36.58 |
| ABJS | Rajinder Nath | 2,162 | 15.20% | ▼8.48 |
| Independent | Rattan Dev Singh | 658 | 4.63% | New |
| INC(O) | Milkha Singh | 303 | 2.13% | New |
| Independent | Khushi Ram | 265 | 1.86% | New |
| Margin of victory | | 8,676 | 60.99% | ▲45.06 |
| Turnout | | 14,226 | 47.40% | ▲7.09 |
| Registered electors | | 30,700 | | ▲10.70 |
| INC hold | | Swing | ▲36.58 | |

=== Assembly Election 1967 ===
1967 Himachal Pradesh Legislative Assembly election: Gagret
| Party | Candidate | Votes | % | ±% |
|---|---|---|---|---|
| INC | Mehnga Singh | 4,311 | 39.60% | New |
| ABJS | G. Dass | 2,577 | 23.67% | New |
| Independent | M. Ram | 1,563 | 14.36% | New |
| Independent | K. Ram | 1,043 | 9.58% | New |
| Independent | D. Datt | 870 | 7.99% | New |
| Independent | U. Singh | 521 | 4.79% | New |
| Margin of victory | | 1,734 | 15.93% | |
| Turnout | | 10,885 | 42.58% | |
| Registered electors | | 27,732 | | |
| INC win (new seat) | | | | |

== See also ==
- Gagret
- Una district
- List of constituencies of Himachal Pradesh Legislative Assembly
