= Lokender Kumar =

Indian politician

- लोकेंद्र कुमार

MLA for Anni
- Incumbent
- Assumed office 2022
- President: Draupadi Murmu
- Prime Minister: Narendra Modi
- Preceded by: Kishori Lal
- Constituency: Anni Assembly constituency

Personal details
- Born: Lokender Kumar; 5 August 1988 (age 37) Anni, Kullu district, Himachal Pradesh, India, Asia
- Citizenship: India
- Party: Bharatiya Janata Party
- Spouse: Sushma Singh
- Parent: Anu Ram (father) Gangi Devi (mother)
- Education: Master of Arts & Master of Social Work
- Alma mater: Himachal Pradesh University
- Occupation: Politician
- Profession: Agriculturist; Trade Unionist
- Nickname: Lokender Babu

Lokender Kumar is an Indian politician, social worker and incumbent Member of Legislative Assembly for Anni assembly constituency as a member of Bharatiya Janata Party. In 2022 Himachal Pradesh Legislative Assembly elections, Lokender Kumar defeated the Kishori Lal of Indian National Congress party.

== Early life ==
Lokender Kumar was born in a Agriculturist Koli family of Kullu district to Anu Ram and Gangi Devi on 5 August 1988.

== Political career ==
- 2002, Volunteer, Rashtriya Swayamsevak Sangh and elected vice president of student union HPU Shimla 2011-12 he was active member of student federation of India (sfi) And also was a cpi(m)MLA face from Anni assembly constituency in 2017 election
- 2015 - 2020, Zila Parishad
- 2022 - Ongoing, Member of Legislative Assembly for Anni Assembly constituency
