= Kamlesh Thakur =

Indian politician (born 1970)

Spouse of the Chief Minister of Himachal Pradesh
- Incumbent
- Assumed role 11 December 2022
- Chief Minister: Sukhvinder Singh Sukhu
- Preceded by: Sadhana Thakur

Member of the Himachal Pradesh Legislative Assembly
- Incumbent
- Assumed office 13 July 2024
- Preceded by: Hoshyar Singh
- Constituency: Dehra

Personal details
- Born: 2 April 1970 (age 56) Dera, Himachal Pradesh, India
- Party: Indian National Congress
- Spouse: Sukhvinder Singh Sukhu
- Children: 2
- Education: Post Graduate Diploma in Computer Applications from Chandigarh; M.A. (Political Science), from Himachal Pradesh University
- Occupation: Politician

Kamlesh Thakur (born 2 April 1970) is an Indian politician from Himachal Pradesh. As a member of Indian National Congress, she is the incumbent MLA from Dehra. She is married to the chief minister of Himachal Pradesh Sukhvinder Singh Sukhu.

== Personal life and education ==
Thakur was born 2 April 1970 in Dehra, District Kangra, Himachal Pradesh. Her parents were Roshni Devi and the Bachitter Singh. She completed her master's of arts degree in Political Science from Himachal Pradesh University and holds a post-graduate diploma in Computer Applications from Chandigarh. She is married to Sukhvinder Singh Sukhu, the Chief Minister of Himachal Pradesh, and they have two daughters. Kamlesh Thakur is an agriculturist and social worker.

== Political career ==
Thakur has been a member of the Himachal Pradesh Congress Committee since 2007. She was elected to the Himachal Pradesh Legislative Assembly from the Dehra constituency for the first time in a by-election on 13 July 2024, where she defeated two-time MLA Hoshyar Singh by a margin of 9,399 votes. She is currently a member of the Public Accounts, Rural Planning, and Members Amenities Committees.

== Interests and activities ==
Her interests include reading newspapers, writing, traveling, and gardening. She enjoys interacting with people and listening to music in her free time. She speaks Hindi, English, and a local dialect.

== Social and cultural work ==
Thakur is involved in social activities, particularly in teaching children about the importance of forests and encouraging them to plant more trees. She is also dedicated to the development of education, social welfare, and the promotion of sports.
