= Dalip Thakur =

Indian politician

Dalip Thakur is an Indian politician. He is Member of the Himachal Pradesh Legislative Assembly from the Sarkaghat Assembly constituency. He is serving since 8 December 2022. He is a Member of the Bharatiya Janata Party.
