= Ram Dass Malangar =

Indian politician

Ram Dass Malangar was an Indian politician and member of the Bharatiya Janata Party. Malangar was a member of the Himachal Pradesh Legislative Assembly from the Kutlehar constituency in Una district. Malangar was Deputy Speaker of Himachal Pradesh Legislative Assembly from 1999 to 2003.
