= Hoshyar Singh =

Indian politician (born 1966)

MLA, Himachal Pradesh Legislative Assembly
- In office 2017 – 3 May 2024
- Preceded by: Ravinder Singh Ravi
- Succeeded by: Kamlesh Thakur
- Constituency: Dehra

Personal details
- Born: 2 October 1966 (age 60) Malad East, Bombay, Maharashtra
- Party: Bharatiya Janata Party
- Other political affiliations: Independent
- Parent(s): Amar Singh; Vidya Devi
- Education: Graduation
- Alma mater: Patkar-Varde College

Hoshyar Singh (born 2 October 1966) is an Indian politician, who currently serves as Member of Legislative Assembly from Dehra Assembly constituency. Hoshyar Singh won from Dehra constituency in 2017 state assembly elections as an independent candidate. He joined BJP in June, 2022.

== Early life and education ==
Singh was born on 2 October 1966 in Malad East, Bombay, Maharashtra to Amar Singh and Vidya Devi. He did his graduation from Patkar-Varde College.

== Politics ==
Singh's active state politics started from 2017. He was elected to the thirteenth Himachal Pradesh Legislative Assembly in December, 2017 as an independent candidate from Dehra constituency. He joined Bharatiya Janata Party in June, 2022, while staying in the office as an independent MLA from Dehra constituency.
