= Virender Kanwar =

Indian politician

Volleyball Federation India
- President: 8 June 2025

Member of the Himachal Pradesh Legislative Assembly
- In office 2003–2022
- Preceded by: Ram Dass Malangar
- Succeeded by: Davinder Kumar Bhutto
- Constituency: Kutlehar

Minister of Rural Development, Panchayati Raj, Agriculture, Animal Husbandry and Fisheries
- In office 2017–2022
- Constituency: Kutlehar

Personal details
- Born: 29 January 1964 (age 62) Nadaun, Himachal Pradesh, India
- Party: Bharatiya Janata Party
- Spouse: Meena Kumari
- Children: One son and one daughter
- Parent: Jagjit Singh (father)
- Education: B.A., LL.B., Diploma in Pharmacy
- Alma mater: Faculty of Law, Himachal Pradesh University (LL.B)
- Profession: Agriculturist

Virender Kanwar is an Indian politician. In 2003, 2007, 2012, and 2017, he was elected in the Himachal Pradesh Legislative Assembly and Himachal Pradesh Legislative Assembly election as a member of the Bharatiya Janata Party. He is the Minister of Rural Development, Panchayati Raj, Agriculture, Animal Husbandry and Fisheries in Jai Ram Thakur cabinet.
