= Reeta Devi (politician) =

Indian politician

MLA, Himachal Pradesh Legislative Assembly
- Incumbent
- Assumed office 2017
- Preceded by: Manohar Dhiman
- Constituency: Indora constituency

Personal details
- Born: 26 November 1975 (age 50) Bhugnara, Kangra, Himachal Pradesh
- Party: Bharatiya Janata Party
- Parent(s): Dulo Ram; Krishna Devi
- Education: 12th, ITI Diploma

Reeta Devi (born 26 November 1975) is an Indian politician from Himachal Pradesh. She was a Member of Legislative Assembly from Indora Assembly constituency. Reeta Devi won from Indora constituency in the 2017 Himachal Pradesh Legislative Assembly election.

== Early life and education ==
Devi was born in Bhugnara, Kangra, Himachal Pradesh to Dulo Ram and Krishna Devi. She did her school education up to Secondary education. Later, she did an ITI diploma in Cutting and Embroidery from ITI Dharmshala.

== Politics ==
Devi's active state politics started from 2010 as she became the Zila Parishad from 2010 to 2015. In 2017, she was elected to the 13th Himachal Pradesh Legislative Assembly in December, 2017.
