= Nadaunta Assembly constituency =

Constituency of the Himachal Pradesh legislative assembly in India

Coordinates: 31.78°N 76.35°E

Nadaunta
- Former constituency for the Himachal Pradesh Legislative Assembly

Constituency details
- Country: India
- Region: North India
- State: Himachal Pradesh
- Established: 1967
- Abolished: 2007
- Total electors: 75,166

Nadaunta Assembly constituency was an assembly constituency in the India state of Himachal Pradesh.

== Members of the Legislative Assembly ==
Election	Member	Party
1967	A. Chand	Indian National Congress
1972	Bishan Dutt Lakhan Pal	Indian National Congress
1977	Udho Ram	Janata Party
1982	Ram Rattan Sharma	Bharatiya Janata Party
1985	Manjit Singh	Indian National Congress
1990	Ram Rattan Sharma	Bharatiya Janata Party
1993	Manjit Singh	Independent politician
1998	Baldev Sharma	Bharatiya Janata Party
2003	Baldev Sharma	Bharatiya Janata Party
2007	Baldev Sharma	Bharatiya Janata Party

== Election results ==
=== Assembly Election 2007 ===
2007 Himachal Pradesh Legislative Assembly election: Nadaunta
Party	Candidate	Votes	%	±%
BJP	Baldev Sharma	25,634	53.80%	▲3.68
INC	Vidya Kumari Jar	10,070	21.14%	▼2.53
Independent	Arvinder Rani	5,629	11.81%	New
BSP	Yash Pal Singh	5,066	10.63%	New
Independent	Tulsi Ram Sharma	804	1.69%	New
LJP	Neeta Sharma	357	0.75%	New
Margin of victory		15,564	32.67%	▲6.21
Turnout		47,646	63.39%	▼9.22
Registered electors		75,166		▲14.94
BJP hold		Swing	▲3.68	

=== Assembly Election 2003 ===
2003 Himachal Pradesh Legislative Assembly election: Nadaunta
Party	Candidate	Votes	%	±%
BJP	Baldev Sharma	23,796	50.12%	▼2.57
INC	Vidya Kumari	11,235	23.66%	▼17.11
Independent	Manjit Singh	10,568	22.26%	New
Independent	Rattan Singh	753	1.59%	New
Independent	Vinod Kumar	601	1.27%	New
Independent	Tulsi Ram	525	1.11%	New
Margin of victory		12,561	26.46%	▲14.53
Turnout		47,478	72.61%	▲0.87
Registered electors		65,394		▲19.38
BJP hold		Swing	▼2.57	

=== Assembly Election 1998 ===
1998 Himachal Pradesh Legislative Assembly election: Nadaunta
Party	Candidate	Votes	%	±%
BJP	Baldev Sharma	20,706	52.69%	▲19.61
INC	Manjit Singh	16,021	40.77%	▲16.19
HVC	Capt. Sri Ram	1,314	3.34%	New
BSP	Gian Chand Dhiman	943	2.40%	▼0.34
Margin of victory		4,685	11.92%	▲11.44
Turnout		39,295	72.48%	▲4.34
Registered electors		54,780		▲4.83
BJP gain from Independent		Swing	▲19.13	

=== Assembly Election 1993 ===
1993 Himachal Pradesh Legislative Assembly election: Nadaunta
Party	Candidate	Votes	%	±%
Independent	Manjit Singh	11,821	33.57%	New
BJP	Ram Rattan Sharma	11,650	33.08%	▼28.69
INC	Rajindra Zar	8,656	24.58%	▼11.73
BSP	Nikke Ram Advocate	964	2.74%	New
JD	Bishan Dutt Lakhanpal	895	2.54%	New
Independent	Suresh Kumar Sharma	443	1.26%	New
Independent	Bishan Dass Jaswal	368	1.04%	New
Independent	Rattan Chand Matauria	313	0.89%	New
Margin of victory		171	0.49%	▼24.98
Turnout		35,216	67.92%	▲2.67
Registered electors		52,256		▲6.45
Independent gain from BJP		Swing	▼28.20	

=== Assembly Election 1990 ===
1990 Himachal Pradesh Legislative Assembly election: Nadaunta
Party	Candidate	Votes	%	±%
BJP	Ram Rattan Sharma	19,626	61.77%	▲21.42
INC	Manjit Singh	11,536	36.31%	▼20.77
INS(SCS)	Bhagi Rath Sharma	456	1.44%	New
Margin of victory		8,090	25.46%	▲8.74
Turnout		31,774	65.49%	▼3.49
Registered electors		49,092		▲30.09
BJP gain from INC		Swing		

=== Assembly Election 1985 ===
1985 Himachal Pradesh Legislative Assembly election: Nadaunta
Party	Candidate	Votes	%	±%
INC	Manjit Singh	14,692	57.07%	▲21.10
BJP	Ram Rattan Sharma	10,387	40.35%	▼2.89
Independent	Prem Chand	342	1.33%	New
Independent	Tilak Raj Gupta	152	0.59%	New
Margin of victory		4,305	16.72%	▲9.45
Turnout		25,742	68.70%	▲4.12
Registered electors		37,738		▲0.90
INC gain from BJP		Swing	▲13.83	

=== Assembly Election 1982 ===
1982 Himachal Pradesh Legislative Assembly election: Nadaunta
Party	Candidate	Votes	%	±%
BJP	Ram Rattan Sharma	10,365	43.24%	New
INC	Prem Chand Verma	8,622	35.97%	▲14.48
JP	Bishan Dutt	3,457	14.42%	▼38.49
Independent	Harbans	362	1.51%	New
Independent	Birender Chaudhary	341	1.42%	New
Independent	Bichittar Singh	331	1.38%	New
Independent	Rangila Ram	216	0.90%	New
Independent	Bhagat Ram	167	0.70%	New
Margin of victory		1,743	7.27%	▼24.15
Turnout		23,970	65.05%	▲9.53
Registered electors		37,402		▲15.10
BJP gain from JP		Swing	▼9.67	

=== Assembly Election 1977 ===
1977 Himachal Pradesh Legislative Assembly election: Nadaunta
Party	Candidate	Votes	%	±%
JP	Udho Ram	9,380	52.91%	New
INC	Pramodh Singh	3,810	21.49%	▼37.92
Independent	Bishan Datt	3,130	17.66%	New
Independent	Sukhdev	873	4.92%	New
Independent	Jagdish Chand	534	3.01%	New
Margin of victory		5,570	31.42%	▼7.04
Turnout		17,727	55.37%	▼0.16
Registered electors		32,495		▲23.88
JP gain from INC		Swing	▼6.50	

=== Assembly Election 1972 ===
1972 Himachal Pradesh Legislative Assembly election: Nadaunta
Party	Candidate	Votes	%	±%
INC	Bishan Dutt Lakhan Pal	8,528	59.42%	▲10.46
Independent	Basant Ram	3,008	20.96%	New
Independent	Joginder Singh	1,443	10.05%	New
Independent	Bhagwan Dass	712	4.96%	New
Independent	Paras Ram	244	1.70%	New
INC(O)	Jagdish Chand	237	1.65%	New
ABJS	Rattan Chand	181	1.26%	▼21.42
Margin of victory		5,520	38.46%	▲12.19
Turnout		14,353	56.71%	▲4.71
Registered electors		26,232		▲6.65
INC hold		Swing	▲10.46	

=== Assembly Election 1967 ===
1967 Himachal Pradesh Legislative Assembly election: Nadaunta
Party	Candidate	Votes	%	±%
INC	A. Chand	6,021	48.96%	New
ABJS	P. Singh	2,790	22.68%	New
Independent	A. Nath	1,326	10.78%	New
Independent	D. Singh	1,152	9.37%	New
Independent	H. Chand	775	6.30%	New
CPI	P. S. Pathania	235	1.91%	New
Margin of victory		3,231	26.27%	
Turnout		12,299	53.77%	
Registered electors		24,597		
INC win (new seat)				
