= Gopalpur, Himachal Pradesh Assembly constituency =

Constituency of the Himachal Pradesh legislative assembly in India

Coordinates: 32.14°N 76.45°E

Gopalpur
- Former constituency for the Himachal Pradesh Legislative Assembly

Constituency details
- Country: India
- Region: North India
- State: Himachal Pradesh
- District: Mandi
- Established: 1967
- Abolished: 2007
- Total electors: 72,951

Gopalpur Assembly constituency was an assembly constituency in the India state of Himachal Pradesh.

== Members of the Legislative Assembly ==
Election	Member	Party
1967	Hari Singh	Independent politician
1972	Rangila Ram Rao	Independent politician
1977	Rangila Ram Rao	Indian National Congress
1982	Rangila Ram Rao	Indian National Congress
1985	Rangila Ram Rao	Indian National Congress
1990	Lila Devi Sharma	Bharatiya Janata Party
1993	Rangila Ram Rao	Indian National Congress
1998	Rangila Ram Rao	Indian National Congress
2003	Rangila Ram Rao	Indian National Congress
2007	Inder Singh	Bharatiya Janata Party

== Election results ==
=== Assembly Election 2007 ===
2007 Himachal Pradesh Legislative Assembly election: Gopalpur
Party	Candidate	Votes	%	±%
BJP	Inder Singh	28,898	55.15%	▲16.74
INC	Rangila Ram Rao	21,350	40.74%	▼2.91
BSP	Susheela Kumari	1,130	2.16%	New
Independent	Sanjeev Kumar	518	0.99%	New
SP	Hukam Chand	285	0.54%	New
LJP	Maheshwar Singh	153	0.29%	New
Margin of victory		7,548	14.40%	▲9.16
Turnout		52,402	71.83%	▼1.11
Registered electors		72,951		▲10.83
BJP gain from INC		Swing	▲11.49	

=== Assembly Election 2003 ===
2003 Himachal Pradesh Legislative Assembly election: Gopalpur
Party	Candidate	Votes	%	±%
INC	Rangila Ram Rao	20,959	43.65%	▼6.85
BJP	Inder Singh	18,440	38.41%	▲21.58
HVC	Teg Singh Thakur	5,639	11.75%	▼19.02
LHMP	Paro Devi	1,094	2.28%	New
Independent	Moti Ram	809	1.69%	New
Independent	Vidya Sagar Sharma	680	1.42%	New
Independent	Balbir Singh	283	0.59%	New
Margin of victory		2,519	5.25%	▼14.50
Turnout		48,011	73.07%	▲1.75
Registered electors		65,822		▲15.04
INC hold		Swing	▼6.85	

=== Assembly Election 1998 ===
1998 Himachal Pradesh Legislative Assembly election: Gopalpur
Party	Candidate	Votes	%	±%
INC	Rangila Ram Rao	20,574	50.51%	▼15.96
HVC	Teg Singh Thakur	12,532	30.76%	New
BJP	Inder Singh	6,854	16.83%	▼15.31
AIRJP	Shakti Chand	410	1.01%	New
Independent	Paro Devi	366	0.90%	New
Margin of victory		8,042	19.74%	▼14.58
Turnout		40,736	71.90%	▼4.82
Registered electors		57,219		▲11.34
INC hold		Swing	▼15.96	

=== Assembly Election 1993 ===
1993 Himachal Pradesh Legislative Assembly election: Gopalpur
Party	Candidate	Votes	%	±%
INC	Rangila Ram Rao	25,960	66.46%	▲18.71
BJP	Randhir Singh Chamdel	12,552	32.14%	▼16.89
BSP	Dina Nath Panchal	320	0.82%	New
JD	Ram Nath Sharma	206	0.53%	New
Margin of victory		13,408	34.33%	▲33.06
Turnout		39,060	76.48%	▲4.91
Registered electors		51,389		▲5.24
INC gain from BJP		Swing	▲17.44	

=== Assembly Election 1990 ===
1990 Himachal Pradesh Legislative Assembly election: Gopalpur
Party	Candidate	Votes	%	±%
BJP	Lila Devi Sharma	17,021	49.02%	▲19.86
INC	Rangila Ram Rao	16,581	47.76%	▼23.08
Independent	Teg Singh Thakur	417	1.20%	New
Independent	Yoginder Singh	246	0.71%	New
Margin of victory		440	1.27%	▼40.40
Turnout		34,720	71.62%	▲0.06
Registered electors		48,832		▲33.39
BJP gain from INC		Swing	▼21.81	

=== Assembly Election 1985 ===
1985 Himachal Pradesh Legislative Assembly election: Gopalpur
Party	Candidate	Votes	%	±%
INC	Rangila Ram Rao	18,423	70.83%	▲1.50
BJP	Lila Devi Sharma	7,586	29.17%	▲1.41
Margin of victory		10,837	41.67%	▲0.09
Turnout		26,009	71.77%	▼4.32
Registered electors		36,609		▲7.38
INC hold		Swing		

=== Assembly Election 1982 ===
1982 Himachal Pradesh Legislative Assembly election: Gopalpur
Party	Candidate	Votes	%	±%
INC	Rangila Ram Rao	17,812	69.33%	▲3.43
BJP	Lila Devi Sharma	7,130	27.75%	New
Independent	Punya	298	1.16%	New
Independent	Hari Singh	240	0.93%	New
Margin of victory		10,682	41.58%	▼9.19
Turnout		25,692	76.18%	▲9.64
Registered electors		34,092		▲15.94
INC hold		Swing	▲3.43	

=== Assembly Election 1977 ===
1977 Himachal Pradesh Legislative Assembly election: Gopalpur
Party	Candidate	Votes	%	±%
INC	Rangila Ram Rao	12,735	65.90%	▲35.36
Independent	Hari Singh	2,925	15.14%	New
JP	Prabhu Ram	2,786	14.42%	New
Independent	Hukum Chand	879	4.55%	New
Margin of victory		9,810	50.76%	▲21.45
Turnout		19,325	66.71%	▲13.55
Registered electors		29,405		▲5.63
INC gain from Independent		Swing	▲6.05	

=== Assembly Election 1972 ===
1972 Himachal Pradesh Legislative Assembly election: Gopalpur
Party	Candidate	Votes	%	±%
Independent	Rangila Ram Rao	8,692	59.85%	New
INC	Hari Singh	4,435	30.54%	▼10.00
Independent	Rajindera Singh	757	5.21%	New
Independent	Lal Singh	552	3.80%	New
Independent	Bachiter Singh	88	0.61%	New
Margin of victory		4,257	29.31%	▲19.16
Turnout		14,524	53.88%	▲5.79
Registered electors		27,839		▲5.45
Independent hold		Swing	▲9.16	

=== Assembly Election 1967 ===
1967 Himachal Pradesh Legislative Assembly election: Gopalpur
Party	Candidate	Votes	%	±%
Independent	Hari Singh	6,206	50.68%	New
INC	S. Singh	4,963	40.53%	New
Independent	S. Dass	613	5.01%	New
Independent	S. Singh	463	3.78%	New
Margin of victory		1,243	10.15%	
Turnout		12,245	48.82%	
Registered electors		26,401		
Independent win (new seat)				
