= Gangath Assembly constituency =

Former Legislative Assembly constituency in Himachal Pradesh, India

Coordinates: 30.44°N 77.59°E

Gangath
- Former constituency for the Himachal Pradesh Legislative Assembly

Constituency details
- Country: India
- Region: North India
- State: Himachal Pradesh
- District: Kangra
- Lok Sabha constituency: Kangra
- Established: 1972
- Abolished: 2012
- Total electors: 73,456
- Reservation: SC

Gangath was one of the 68 constituencies of the Himachal Pradesh Legislative Assembly, in Himachal Pradesh, a state in North India. It was a part of Kangra Lok Sabha constituency. It existed from 1972 to 2012 and comprised parts of Nurpur tehsil in Kangra district. It was last represented (from 2007 to 2012) by Des Raj of the Bharatiya Janata Party.

== Member of Legislative Assembly ==
Year	Member	Party
1967	Dhinoo Ram	Indian National Congress
1972	Dhinoo Ram	Indian National Congress
1977	Durga Dass	Janata Party
1982	Des Raj	Bharatiya Janata Party
1985	Girdhari Lal	Indian National Congress
1990	Des Raj	Bharatiya Janata Party
1993	Durga Dass	Indian National Congress
1998	Des Raj	Bharatiya Janata Party
2003	Bodh Raj	Indian National Congress
2007	Des Raj	Bharatiya Janata Party

== Election results ==
=== Assembly Election 2007 ===
2007 Himachal Pradesh Legislative Assembly election: Gangath
Party	Candidate	Votes	%	±%
BJP	Des Raj	24,520	46.26%	▲2.17
Independent	Anita Kumari	23,830	44.95%	New
BSP	Hans Raj Jassal	4,612	8.70%	▲6.23
Margin of victory		690	1.30%	▼3.22
Turnout		53,010	72.17%	▼4.96
Registered electors		73,456		▲12.41
BJP gain from INC		Swing	▼2.35	

=== Assembly Election 2003 ===
2003 Himachal Pradesh Legislative Assembly election: Gangath
Party	Candidate	Votes	%	±%
INC	Bodh Raj	24,499	48.61%	▲1.37
BJP	Des Raj	22,220	44.09%	▼3.53
BSP	Hans Raj Jassal	1,243	2.47%	▼0.35
Independent	Ashok Kumar	832	1.65%	New
HVC	Surinder Kumar	794	1.58%	▲0.56
Independent	Shyam Lal Baru	644	1.28%	New
Margin of victory		2,279	4.52%	▲4.15
Turnout		50,401	77.37%	▲4.15
Registered electors		65,349		▲20.97
INC gain from BJP		Swing	▲0.99	

=== Assembly Election 1998 ===
1998 Himachal Pradesh Legislative Assembly election: Gangath
Party	Candidate	Votes	%	±%
BJP	Des Raj	18,771	47.61%	▲11.56
INC	Bodh Raj	18,623	47.24%	▲4.24
BSP	Karan Dass	1,109	2.81%	▼0.48
CPI	Sham Lal	521	1.32%	▼0.51
HVC	Piare Lal	399	1.01%	New
Margin of victory		148	0.38%	▼6.56
Turnout		39,423	73.86%	▼0.35
Registered electors		54,022		▲6.20
BJP gain from INC		Swing	▲4.62	

=== Assembly Election 1993 ===
1993 Himachal Pradesh Legislative Assembly election: Gangath
Party	Candidate	Votes	%	±%
INC	Durga Dass	16,036	43.00%	▲19.04
BJP	Des Raj	13,448	36.06%	▼32.24
Independent	Pyare Lal	5,315	14.25%	New
BSP	Yash Paul	1,230	3.30%	▲0.60
CPI	Mohindar Singh	682	1.83%	▼2.04
Independent	Roshan Lal	405	1.09%	New
Margin of victory		2,588	6.94%	▼37.41
Turnout		37,296	74.05%	▲6.73
Registered electors		50,866		▲10.47
INC gain from BJP		Swing	▼25.31	

=== Assembly Election 1990 ===
1990 Himachal Pradesh Legislative Assembly election: Gangath
Party	Candidate	Votes	%	±%
BJP	Des Raj	20,944	68.30%	▲33.33
INC	Girdhari Lal	7,345	23.95%	▼17.33
CPI	Sham Lal	1,186	3.87%	▲0.01
BSP	Charan Dass Sarotri	828	2.70%	New
Doordarshi Party	Parkash Chand	297	0.97%	New
Margin of victory		13,599	44.35%	▲38.04
Turnout		30,664	66.95%	▼9.52
Registered electors		46,045		▲35.06
BJP gain from INC		Swing	▲27.02	

=== Assembly Election 1985 ===
1985 Himachal Pradesh Legislative Assembly election: Gangath
Party	Candidate	Votes	%	±%
INC	Girdhari Lal	10,711	41.28%	▲3.80
BJP	Des Raj	9,074	34.97%	▼13.71
Independent	Duni Chand	3,239	12.48%	New
Independent	Durga Dass	1,007	3.88%	New
CPI	Mohinder Singh	1,001	3.86%	▲1.20
Independent	Charan Dass Sarotri	771	2.97%	New
Independent	Som Raj	144	0.55%	New
Margin of victory		1,637	6.31%	▼4.89
Turnout		25,947	77.03%	▼3.22
Registered electors		34,091		▲12.03
INC gain from BJP		Swing	▼7.40	

=== Assembly Election 1982 ===
1982 Himachal Pradesh Legislative Assembly election: Gangath
Party	Candidate	Votes	%	±%
BJP	Des Raj	11,751	48.68%	New
INC	Dhinoo Ram	9,048	37.48%	New
Independent	Duni Chand	2,083	8.63%	New
CPI	Joginder Singh	642	2.66%	▼38.25
LKD	Wadhawa Ram	489	2.03%	New
Independent	Charan Dass Sarotri	127	0.53%	New
Margin of victory		2,703	11.20%	▼0.94
Turnout		24,140	80.40%	▲12.16
Registered electors		30,431		▲15.16
BJP gain from JP		Swing	▼4.37	

=== Assembly Election 1977 ===
1977 Himachal Pradesh Legislative Assembly election: Gangath
Party	Candidate	Votes	%	±%
JP	Durga Dass	9,416	53.05%	New
CPI	Shankar Singh	7,261	40.91%	New
Independent	Bansi Lal	593	3.34%	New
Independent	Bihari Lal	232	1.31%	New
Independent	Sant Ram	136	0.77%	New
Independent	Charan Dass Sarotri	111	0.63%	New
Margin of victory		2,155	12.14%	▼16.49
Turnout		17,749	68.17%	▲11.48
Registered electors		26,426		▲7.98
JP gain from INC		Swing	▼5.67	

=== Assembly Election 1972 ===
1972 Himachal Pradesh Legislative Assembly election: Gangath
Party	Candidate	Votes	%	±%
INC	Dhinoo Ram	8,002	58.72%	▲27.04
Independent	Om Prakash	4,100	30.09%	New
ABJS	Durga Dass	1,361	9.99%	New
Independent	Bansi Lal	109	0.80%	New
Margin of victory		3,902	28.63%	▲20.32
Turnout		13,627	57.42%	▲6.50
Registered electors		24,472		▼0.30
INC hold		Swing	▲27.04	

=== Assembly Election 1967 ===
1967 Himachal Pradesh Legislative Assembly election: Gangath
Party	Candidate	Votes	%	±%
INC	Dhinoo Ram	3,825	31.68%	New
SWA	Durga Dass	2,821	23.37%	New
Independent	O. Parkash	2,162	17.91%	New
RPI	S. Singh	1,833	15.18%	New
Independent	Duni Chand	1,058	8.76%	New
CPI(M)	B. Lal	373	3.09%	New
Margin of victory		1,004	8.32%	
Turnout		12,072	53.68%	
Registered electors		24,545		
INC win (new seat)				
