= Rainka Assembly constituency =

Constituency of the Himachal Pradesh legislative assembly in India

Coordinates: 32.751°N 75.93°E

Rainka
- Former constituency for the Himachal Pradesh Legislative Assembly

Constituency details
- Country: India
- Region: North India
- State: Himachal Pradesh
- Established: 1952
- Abolished: 2007
- Total electors: 52,812

Rainka was an assembly constituency in the India state of Himachal Pradesh.

== Members of the Legislative Assembly ==
Election	Member	Party
1952	Dharam Singh	Independent politician
1952	Partap Singh	Indian National Congress
1967	Yashwant Singh Parmar	Indian National Congress
1972	Yeshwant Singh Parmar	Indian National Congress
1977	Roop Singh	Janata Party
1982	Prem Singh	Indian National Congress
1985	Prem Singh	Indian National Congress
1990	Roop Singh	Janata Dal
1993	Prem Singh	Indian National Congress
1998	Prem Singh	Indian National Congress
2003	Dr. Prem Singh	Indian National Congress
2007	Dr. Prem Singh	Indian National Congress

== Election results ==
=== Assembly By-election 2011 ===
2011 Himachal Pradesh Legislative Assembly by-election: Rainka
Party	Candidate	Votes	%	±%
BJP	Hirdaya Ram	20,804	53.13%	▲9.29
INC	Vinay Kumar	17,278	44.12%	▼7.94
Independent	Sunder Singh	1,075	2.75%	New
Margin of victory		3,526	9.00%	▲0.78
Turnout		39,157	74.62%	▼0.86
Registered electors		52,473		▼0.64
BJP gain from INC		Swing	▲1.06	

=== Assembly Election 2007 ===
2007 Himachal Pradesh Legislative Assembly election: Rainka
Party	Candidate	Votes	%	±%
INC	Dr. Prem Singh	20,756	52.07%	▼2.88
BJP	Balbir Singh	17,477	43.84%	▲6.34
BSP	Prithvi Singh	1,609	4.04%	New
Margin of victory		3,279	8.23%	▼9.22
Turnout		39,863	75.48%	▼1.90
Registered electors		52,812		▲12.57
INC hold		Swing	▼2.88	

=== Assembly Election 2003 ===
2003 Himachal Pradesh Legislative Assembly election: Rainka
Party	Candidate	Votes	%	±%
INC	Dr. Prem Singh	19,948	54.95%	▼11.36
BJP	Balbir Singh	13,614	37.50%	▲7.38
HVC	Madhu Ram	1,079	2.97%	▲0.94
Independent	Gorkh Ram	969	2.67%	New
LJP	Mohan Lal Azad	692	1.91%	New
Margin of victory		6,334	17.45%	▼18.75
Turnout		36,302	77.41%	▲5.64
Registered electors		46,915		▲8.40
INC hold		Swing	▼11.36	

=== Assembly Election 1998 ===
1998 Himachal Pradesh Legislative Assembly election: Rainka
Party	Candidate	Votes	%	±%
INC	Prem Singh	20,590	66.31%	▲10.79
BJP	Roop Singh	9,352	30.12%	▼12.10
HVC	Chander Sain	632	2.04%	New
JD	Gorkhu Ram	475	1.53%	New
Margin of victory		11,238	36.19%	▲22.89
Turnout		31,049	73.93%	▲1.46
Registered electors		43,280		▲8.95
INC hold		Swing	▲10.79	

=== Assembly Election 1993 ===
1993 Himachal Pradesh Legislative Assembly election: Rainka
Party	Candidate	Votes	%	±%
INC	Prem Singh	15,500	55.52%	▲11.74
BJP	Mohan Lal Azad	11,786	42.22%	New
Independent	Rati Ram	371	1.33%	New
Independent	Chet Ram	182	0.65%	New
Margin of victory		3,714	13.30%	▲2.74
Turnout		27,917	70.94%	▲3.72
Registered electors		39,724		▲3.85
INC gain from JD		Swing	▲1.18	

=== Assembly Election 1990 ===
1990 Himachal Pradesh Legislative Assembly election: Rainka
Party	Candidate	Votes	%	±%
JD	Roop Singh	13,836	54.34%	New
INC	Prem Singh	11,147	43.78%	▼25.68
Independent	Rati Ram Sirmauri	477	1.87%	New
Margin of victory		2,689	10.56%	▼31.23
Turnout		25,460	67.25%	▲5.11
Registered electors		38,253		▲16.89
JD gain from INC		Swing		

=== Assembly Election 1985 ===
1985 Himachal Pradesh Legislative Assembly election: Rainka
Party	Candidate	Votes	%	±%
INC	Prem Singh	13,968	69.46%	▲10.99
BJP	Mohan Lal	5,564	27.67%	▲15.55
JP	Atma Ram	577	2.87%	▼24.56
Margin of victory		8,404	41.79%	▲10.75
Turnout		20,109	62.27%	▲5.36
Registered electors		32,726		▲2.54
INC hold		Swing		

=== Assembly Election 1982 ===
1982 Himachal Pradesh Legislative Assembly election: Rainka
Party	Candidate	Votes	%	±%
INC	Prem Singh	10,466	58.47%	▲26.85
JP	Mohan Lal	4,910	27.43%	▼33.93
BJP	Gorakh Ram	2,170	12.12%	New
Independent	Ratti Ram	237	1.32%	New
Independent	Kehar Singh	117	0.65%	New
Margin of victory		5,556	31.04%	▲1.31
Turnout		17,900	56.89%	▲8.47
Registered electors		31,916		▲8.82
INC gain from JP		Swing	▼2.89	

=== Assembly Election 1977 ===
1977 Himachal Pradesh Legislative Assembly election: Rainka
Party	Candidate	Votes	%	±%
JP	Roop Singh	8,568	61.36%	New
INC	Nain Singh Tomar	4,416	31.62%	▼61.76
Independent	Pratap Singh	980	7.02%	New
Margin of victory		4,152	29.73%	▼57.04
Turnout		13,964	48.32%	▼1.78
Registered electors		29,328		▲11.44
JP gain from INC		Swing		

=== Assembly Election 1972 ===
1972 Himachal Pradesh Legislative Assembly election: Rainka
Party	Candidate	Votes	%	±%
INC	Yeshwant Singh Parmar	12,140	93.38%	▲12.67
ABJS	Narain Singh	860	6.62%	▼12.67
Margin of victory		11,280	86.77%	▲25.34
Turnout		13,000	50.72%	▲6.59
Registered electors		26,317		▼9.17
INC hold		Swing		

=== Assembly Election 1967 ===
1967 Himachal Pradesh Legislative Assembly election: Rainka
Party	Candidate	Votes	%	±%
INC	Yashwant Singh Parmar	10,010	80.71%	▲34.54
ABJS	N. Singh	2,392	19.29%	New
Margin of victory		7,618	61.43%	▲53.76
Turnout		12,402	44.62%	▲22.46
Registered electors		28,973		▼2.87
INC gain from Independent		Swing	▲26.88	

=== Assembly Election 1952 ===
1952 Himachal Pradesh Legislative Assembly election: Rainka
Party	Candidate	Votes	%	±%
Independent	Dharam Singh	3,267	53.83%	New
INC	Yashwant Singh Parmar	2,802	46.17%	New
INC	Partap Singh			New
Margin of victory		465	7.66%	
Turnout		6,069	20.35%	
Registered electors		29,828		
Independent win (new seat)				
