= Chachiot Assembly constituency =

Former Assembly constituency in Himachal Pradesh, India

Coordinates: 31.55°N 77.01°E

Chachiot
- Former constituency for the Himachal Pradesh Legislative Assembly

Constituency details
- Country: India
- Region: North India
- State: Himachal Pradesh
- District: Mandi
- Lok Sabha constituency: Mandi
- Established: 1951
- Abolished: 2012
- Reservation: None

Chachiot was one of the 68 constituencies in the Himachal Pradesh Legislative Assembly of Himachal Pradesh a northern state of India. It was also part of Mandi Lok Sabha constituency.

== Members of the Legislative Assembly ==
Year	Member	Party
1952	Krishna Chandar; Piru	Indian National Congress
1967	Karam Singh	Indian National Congress
1972	Karam Singh	Indian National Congress
1977	Moti Ram	Janata Party
1982	Moti Ram	Independent politician
1985	Shivlal Sharma	Indian National Congress
1990	Moti Ram	
1993	Moti Ram	Indian National Congress
1998	Jai Ram Thakur	Bharatiya Janata Party
2003	Jai Ram Thakur	Bharatiya Janata Party
2007	Jai Ram Thakur	Bharatiya Janata Party

== Election results ==
=== Assembly Election 2007 ===
2007 Himachal Pradesh Legislative Assembly election: Chachiot
Party	Candidate	Votes	%	±%
BJP	Jai Ram Thakur	27,102	49.50%	▲5.86
INC	Shivlal Sharma	23,917	43.68%	▲24.69
CPI(M)	Jagdish Thakur	1,675	3.06%	New
BSP	Jagdish Reddy	1,304	2.38%	New
Margin of victory		3,185	5.82%	▼9.92
Turnout		54,755	82.82%	▲0.48
Registered electors		66,110		▲12.89
BJP hold		Swing	▲5.86	

=== Assembly Election 2003 ===
2003 Himachal Pradesh Legislative Assembly election: Chachiot
Party	Candidate	Votes	%	±%
BJP	Jai Ram Thakur	21,040	43.63%	▲4.89
HVC	Shivlal Sharma	13,452	27.90%	▲3.77
INC	Chet Ram	9,158	18.99%	▼5.15
LHMP	Jassi Devi	3,664	7.60%	New
CPI	Sant Ram	907	1.88%	New
Margin of victory		7,588	15.74%	▲1.14
Turnout		48,221	82.49%	▲6.27
Registered electors		58,562		▲12.53
BJP hold		Swing	▲4.89	

=== Assembly Election 1998 ===
1998 Himachal Pradesh Legislative Assembly election: Chachiot
Party	Candidate	Votes	%	±%
BJP	Jai Ram Thakur	15,337	38.74%	▲15.64
INC	Moti Ram	9,558	24.14%	▼4.60
HVC	Shivlal Sharma	9,553	24.13%	New
Independent	Damodar Dass Thakur	3,306	8.35%	New
Independent	Jawahar Lal	692	1.75%	New
BSP	Mast Ram Chauhan	508	1.28%	▼3.66
AIRJP	Het Ram	338	0.85%	New
Independent	Govind Ram Thakur	296	0.75%	New
Margin of victory		5,779	14.60%	▲8.96
Turnout		39,588	76.46%	▲3.33
Registered electors		52,042		▲9.43
BJP gain from INC		Swing	▲10.00	

=== Assembly Election 1993 ===
1993 Himachal Pradesh Legislative Assembly election: Chachiot
Party	Candidate	Votes	%	±%
INC	Moti Ram	9,944	28.75%	▲9.63
BJP	Jai Ram Thakur	7,993	23.11%	New
Independent	Vir Singh	5,592	16.17%	New
Independent	Shivlal Sharma	5,544	16.03%	New
Independent	Chet Ram Thakur	3,406	9.85%	New
BSP	Bir Singh	1,711	4.95%	New
Independent	Padam Singh	178	0.51%	New
Margin of victory		1,951	5.64%	▼12.69
Turnout		34,592	73.21%	▲2.01
Registered electors		47,556		▲10.47
INC win (new seat)				

=== Assembly Election 1990 ===
1990 Himachal Pradesh Legislative Assembly election: Chachiot
Party	Candidate	Votes	%	±%
JD	Moti Ram	12,654	41.56%	New
Independent	Vir Singh	7,072	23.23%	New
INC	Shivlal Sharma	5,822	19.12%	▼31.51
Independent	Bir Singh	4,418	14.51%	New
Independent	Nok Singh	272	0.89%	New
Margin of victory		5,582	18.33%	▲10.97
Turnout		30,448	71.11%	▼3.87
Registered electors		43,047		▲25.48
win (new seat)				

=== Assembly Election 1985 ===
1985 Himachal Pradesh Legislative Assembly election: Chachiot
Party	Candidate	Votes	%	±%
INC	Shivlal Sharma	12,958	50.63%	▲9.00
Independent	Moti Ram	11,074	43.27%	New
BJP	Bale Ram	837	3.27%	▼5.25
Independent	Lachhman Das	491	1.92%	New
CPI(M)	Uttam Singh	232	0.91%	New
Margin of victory		1,884	7.36%	▲5.41
Turnout		25,592	75.16%	▼1.37
Registered electors		34,306		▲5.83
INC gain from Independent		Swing	▲7.05	

=== Assembly Election 1982 ===
1982 Himachal Pradesh Legislative Assembly election: Chachiot
Party	Candidate	Votes	%	±%
Independent	Moti Ram	10,733	43.58%	New
INC	Karam Singh	10,252	41.63%	▲13.22
BJP	Lal Singh	2,098	8.52%	New
Independent	Lotam Ram Chauhan	936	3.80%	New
JP	Jai Chand	608	2.47%	▼62.07
Margin of victory		481	1.95%	▼34.18
Turnout		24,627	76.53%	▲17.86
Registered electors		32,416		▲16.65
Independent gain from JP		Swing	▼20.96	

=== Assembly Election 1977 ===
1977 Himachal Pradesh Legislative Assembly election: Chachiot
Party	Candidate	Votes	%	±%
JP	Moti Ram	10,423	64.54%	New
INC	Karam Singh	4,588	28.41%	▼37.25
Independent	Khem Singh	1,138	7.05%	New
Margin of victory		5,835	36.13%	▼2.54
Turnout		16,149	58.83%	▲10.07
Registered electors		27,789		▼6.49
JP gain from INC		Swing		

=== Assembly Election 1972 ===
1972 Himachal Pradesh Legislative Assembly election: Chachiot
Party	Candidate	Votes	%	±%
INC	Karam Singh	9,374	65.66%	▲10.45
Independent	Moti Ram	3,853	26.99%	New
Independent	Jai Chand	1,049	7.35%	New
Margin of victory		5,521	38.67%	▲28.25
Turnout		14,276	49.02%	▼1.75
Registered electors		29,717		▲0.92
INC hold		Swing		

=== Assembly Election 1967 ===
1967 Himachal Pradesh Legislative Assembly election: Chachiot
Party	Candidate	Votes	%	±%
INC	Karam Singh	8,095	55.21%	▲32.47
Independent	M. Ram	6,567	44.79%	New
Margin of victory		1,528	10.42%	▲5.26
Turnout		14,662	51.64%	▲16.71
Registered electors		29,447		▲2.99
INC hold		Swing	▲32.47	

=== Assembly Election 1952 ===
1952 Himachal Pradesh Legislative Assembly election: Chachiot
Party	Candidate	Votes	%	±%
INC	Krishna Chandar	2,151	22.74%	New
KMPP	Ram Singh	1,663	17.58%	New
INC	Piru	1,653	17.48%	New
KMPP	Minu	1,529	16.17%	New
Independent	Gulab Singh	973	10.29%	New
Socialist	Dugla	883	9.34%	New
Socialist	Devi Rup	606	6.41%	New
Margin of victory		488	5.16%	
Turnout		9,458	33.08%	
Registered electors		28,591		
INC win (new seat)				

== See also ==
- List of constituencies of Himachal Pradesh Legislative Assembly
