= Rajgir, Himachal Pradesh Assembly constituency =

Constituency of the Himachal Pradesh legislative assembly in India

Coordinates: 32.07°N 75.80°E

Rajgir
- Former constituency for the Himachal Pradesh Legislative Assembly

Constituency details
- Country: India
- Region: North India
- State: Himachal Pradesh
- Established: 1952
- Abolished: 2007
- Total electors: 59,191

Rajgir Assembly constituency was an assembly constituency in the India state of Himachal Pradesh.

== Members of the Legislative Assembly ==
Election	Member	Party
1952	Ghan Shyam	Independent politician
1967	Wazir	Indian National Congress
1972	Wazir	Indian National Congress
1977	Guler Chand	Janata Party
1982	Milkhi Ram Goma	Indian National Congress
1985	Milkhi Ram Goma	Indian National Congress
1990	Atma Ram	Bharatiya Janata Party
1993	Milkhi Ram Goma	Indian National Congress
1998	Atma Ram	Bharatiya Janata Party
2003	Atma Ram	Bharatiya Janata Party
2007	Atma Ram	Bharatiya Janata Party

== Election results ==
=== Assembly Election 2007 ===
2007 Himachal Pradesh Legislative Assembly election: Rajgir
Party	Candidate	Votes	%	±%
BJP	Atma Ram	18,829	49.15%	▲7.33
INC	Dr. Milkhi Ram Goma	17,611	45.97%	▲7.64
BSP	Vidya Devi	1,200	3.13%	New
LJP	Sher Singh	588	1.53%	▲0.90
Margin of victory		1,218	3.18%	▼0.32
Turnout		38,308	64.72%	▼5.98
Registered electors		59,191		▲16.54
BJP hold		Swing	▲7.33	

=== Assembly Election 2003 ===
2003 Himachal Pradesh Legislative Assembly election: Rajgir
Party	Candidate	Votes	%	±%
BJP	Atma Ram	15,018	41.83%	▼3.16
INC	Dr. Milkhi Ram Goma	13,763	38.33%	▲4.60
Independent	Pritam Chand	6,005	16.72%	New
SP	Uttam Singh	451	1.26%	New
HVC	Parkash Chand	440	1.23%	▼15.08
LJP	Sudesh Kumari	229	0.64%	New
Margin of victory		1,255	3.50%	▼7.77
Turnout		35,906	70.71%	▲5.68
Registered electors		50,790		▲8.38
BJP hold		Swing	▼3.16	

=== Assembly Election 1998 ===
1998 Himachal Pradesh Legislative Assembly election: Rajgir
Party	Candidate	Votes	%	±%
BJP	Atma Ram	13,708	44.99%	▲6.29
INC	Milkhi Ram Goma	10,276	33.73%	▼22.23
HVC	K. C. Kalyan	4,968	16.31%	New
CPI	Sher Singh Heer	1,292	4.24%	▲1.90
AIRJP	Birbal Singh Dogra	225	0.74%	New
Margin of victory		3,432	11.26%	▼5.99
Turnout		30,469	65.92%	▼5.13
Registered electors		46,862		▲14.73
BJP gain from INC		Swing	▼10.97	

=== Assembly Election 1993 ===
1993 Himachal Pradesh Legislative Assembly election: Rajgir
Party	Candidate	Votes	%	±%
INC	Milkhi Ram Goma	16,035	55.96%	▲24.53
BJP	Atma Ram	11,090	38.70%	▼15.33
CPI	Sher Singh	671	2.34%	▼9.37
BSP	Haria Ram	377	1.32%	▲0.67
Independent	Piar Chand	224	0.78%	New
Independent	Birbal Singh	187	0.65%	New
Margin of victory		4,945	17.26%	▼5.35
Turnout		28,654	70.73%	▲5.86
Registered electors		40,846		▲4.98
INC gain from BJP		Swing	▲1.92	

=== Assembly Election 1990 ===
1990 Himachal Pradesh Legislative Assembly election: Rajgir
Party	Candidate	Votes	%	±%
BJP	Atma Ram	13,517	54.04%	▲18.44
INC	Milkhi Ram Goma	7,861	31.43%	▼20.45
CPI	Piar Chand	2,930	11.71%	▲1.83
Independent	Birbal	307	1.23%	New
Doordarshi Party	Om Prahash	184	0.74%	New
BSP	Kishori Lal	161	0.64%	New
Margin of victory		5,656	22.61%	▲6.34
Turnout		25,014	64.96%	▼2.48
Registered electors		38,909		▲26.59
BJP gain from INC		Swing	▲2.16	

=== Assembly Election 1985 ===
1985 Himachal Pradesh Legislative Assembly election: Rajgir
Party	Candidate	Votes	%	±%
INC	Milkhi Ram Goma	10,646	51.88%	▲3.10
BJP	Atma Ram	7,306	35.60%	▲0.59
CPI	Bhagat Ram	2,028	9.88%	▲1.63
Independent	Haria	384	1.87%	New
Independent	Om Parkash Jogi	158	0.77%	New
Margin of victory		3,340	16.28%	▲2.51
Turnout		20,522	67.80%	▼1.01
Registered electors		30,736		▲8.57
INC hold		Swing	▲3.10	

=== Assembly Election 1982 ===
1982 Himachal Pradesh Legislative Assembly election: Rajgir
Party	Candidate	Votes	%	±%
INC	Milkhi Ram Goma	9,358	48.77%	▲15.48
BJP	Shambhu Ram	6,717	35.01%	New
CPI	Piar Chand	1,583	8.25%	▼2.44
Independent	Guler Chand	988	5.15%	New
Independent	Chander Parkash	373	1.94%	New
JP	Dharam Chand Premi	168	0.88%	▼45.38
Margin of victory		2,641	13.76%	▲0.80
Turnout		19,187	68.68%	▲16.50
Registered electors		28,310		▲2.19
INC gain from JP		Swing	▲2.52	

=== Assembly Election 1977 ===
1977 Himachal Pradesh Legislative Assembly election: Rajgir
Party	Candidate	Votes	%	±%
JP	Guler Chand	6,571	46.26%	New
INC	Milkhi Ram Goma	4,729	33.29%	▼13.34
CPI	Piaru	1,519	10.69%	New
Independent	Wazirchand	803	5.65%	New
Independent	Praaksh Dhaugary	341	2.40%	New
Independent	Bhakhirdu	132	0.93%	New
Margin of victory		1,842	12.97%	▼0.06
Turnout		14,206	52.02%	▲19.45
Registered electors		27,704		▲6.73
JP gain from INC		Swing	▼0.37	

=== Assembly Election 1972 ===
1972 Himachal Pradesh Legislative Assembly election: Rajgir
Party	Candidate	Votes	%	±%
INC	Wazir	3,852	46.63%	▲9.85
Independent	Guler Chand	2,776	33.60%	New
ABJS	Shambhu Ram	824	9.97%	▼18.81
Independent	Bakhirdu	350	4.24%	New
Independent	Phula Singh	294	3.56%	New
Independent	Ratto Alias Rattan Lal	165	2.00%	New
Margin of victory		1,076	13.03%	▲5.03
Turnout		8,261	32.52%	▼5.55
Registered electors		25,956		▼7.96
INC hold		Swing	▲9.85	

=== Assembly Election 1967 ===
1967 Himachal Pradesh Legislative Assembly election: Rajgir
Party	Candidate	Votes	%	±%
INC	Wazir	3,877	36.78%	▲12.85
ABJS	S. Ram	3,034	28.79%	New
Independent	H. Singh	1,484	14.08%	New
CPI	Moni	1,041	9.88%	New
Independent	D. Singh	898	8.52%	New
Independent	Dhania	206	1.95%	New
Margin of victory		843	8.00%	▼13.77
Turnout		10,540	39.97%	▲12.47
Registered electors		28,200		▲102.50
INC gain from Independent		Swing	▼8.92	

=== Assembly Election 1952 ===
1952 Himachal Pradesh Legislative Assembly election: Rajgir
Party	Candidate	Votes	%	±%
Independent	Ghan Shyam	1,585	45.70%	New
INC	Bhagat Chand	830	23.93%	New
KMPP	Sat Dev	720	20.76%	New
Independent	Jai Chand	333	9.60%	New
Margin of victory		755	21.77%	
Turnout		3,468	24.90%	
Registered electors		13,926		
Independent win (new seat)				
