= Polianbeet Assembly constituency =

Constituency of the Himachal Pradesh legislative assembly in India

Coordinates: 31.35°N 76.20°E

Polianbeet
- Former constituency for the Himachal Pradesh Legislative Assembly

Constituency details
- Country: India
- Region: North India
- State: Himachal Pradesh
- Established: 1972
- Abolished: 1972
- Total electors: 28,120

Polianbeet Assembly constituency was an assembly constituency in the India state of Himachal Pradesh.

== Members of the Legislative Assembly ==
Election	Member	Party
1972	Kashmiri Lal	Indian National Congress

== Election results ==
=== Assembly Election 1972 ===
1972 Himachal Pradesh Legislative Assembly election: Polianbeet
Party	Candidate	Votes	%	±%
INC	Kashmiri Lal	12,214	79.50%	New
Independent	Hoshiar Singh	2,359	15.36%	New
Independent	Attar Chand	416	2.71%	New
Independent	Inder Singh	374	2.43%	New
Margin of victory		9,855	64.15%	
Turnout		15,363	55.89%	
Registered electors		28,120		
INC win (new seat)				
