= Khera Assembly constituency =

Constituency of the Himachal Pradesh legislative assembly in India

Coordinates: 31.02°N 76.77°E

Khera
- Former constituency for the Himachal Pradesh Legislative Assembly

Constituency details
- Country: India
- Region: North India
- State: Himachal Pradesh
- District: Solan
- Established: 1972
- Abolished: 1972
- Total electors: 25,383

Khera Assembly constituency was an assembly constituency in the India state of Himachal Pradesh.

== Members of the Legislative Assembly ==
Election	Member	Party
1972	Shanta Kumar	Bharatiya Jana Sangh

== Election results ==
=== Assembly Election 1972 ===
1972 Himachal Pradesh Legislative Assembly election: Khera
Party	Candidate	Votes	%	±%
ABJS	Shanta Kumar	5,166	43.59%	New
INC	Kamla Devi	4,151	35.02%	New
CPI	Karma Chand	2,535	21.39%	New
Margin of victory		1,015	8.56%	
Turnout		11,852	47.76%	
Registered electors		25,383		
ABJS win (new seat)				
