= Outer Seraj Assembly constituency =

Constituency of the Himachal Pradesh legislative assembly in India

Coordinates: 31.478°N 77.624°E

Outer Seraj
- Former constituency for the Himachal Pradesh Legislative Assembly

Constituency details
- Country: India
- Region: North India
- State: Himachal Pradesh
- District: Mandi
- Lok Sabha constituency: Mandi
- Established: 1967
- Abolished: 1972
- Total electors: 32,755

Outer Seraj was an assembly constituency in the India state of Himachal Pradesh.

== Members of the Legislative Assembly ==
Election	Member	Party
1967	Islhar Dass	Indian National Congress
1972	Islhar Dass	Indian National Congress

== Election results ==
=== Assembly Election 1972 ===
1972 Himachal Pradesh Legislative Assembly election: Outer Seraj
Party	Candidate	Votes	%	±%
INC	Islhar Dass	7,000	58.25%	▼36.14
CPI	Talku Ram	3,213	26.73%	New
LRP	Daru Rass	1,805	15.02%	New
Margin of victory		3,787	31.51%	▼57.26
Turnout		12,018	37.87%	▲11.58
Registered electors		32,755		▲24.09
INC hold		Swing		

=== Assembly Election 1967 ===
1967 Himachal Pradesh Legislative Assembly election: Outer Seraj
Party	Candidate	Votes	%	±%
INC	Islhar Dass	6,256	94.39%	New
Independent	J. Ram	372	5.61%	New
Margin of victory		5,884	88.77%	
Turnout		6,628	26.22%	
Registered electors		26,397		
INC win (new seat)				
