= Rajgir Assembly constituency =

Rajgir Assembly constituency could refer to:

- Rajgir, Bihar Assembly constituency
- Rajgir, Himachal Pradesh Assembly constituency
