= Inner Seraj Assembly constituency =

Constituency of the Himachal Pradesh legislative assembly in India

Coordinates: 31.57°N 77.31°E

Inner Seraj
- Former constituency for the Himachal Pradesh Legislative Assembly

Constituency details
- Country: India
- Region: North India
- State: Himachal Pradesh
- District: Mandi
- Lok Sabha constituency: Mandi
- Established: 1967
- Abolished: 1972
- Total electors: 33,104

Inner Seraj was an assembly constituency in the India state of Himachal Pradesh.

== Members of the Legislative Assembly ==
Election	Member	Party
1967	Dile Ram Shabab	Indian National Congress
1972	Dile Ram Shabab	Indian National Congress

== Election results ==
=== Assembly Election 1972 ===
1972 Himachal Pradesh Legislative Assembly election: Inner Seraj
Party	Candidate	Votes	%	±%
INC	Dile Ram Shabab	8,043	46.46%	▲13.93
Independent	Beli Ram Thakur	5,329	30.79%	New
Independent	Rma Prashad	1,900	10.98%	New
Independent	Laxmi Datt	936	5.41%	New
Independent	Nathu	613	3.54%	New
Independent	Nawal Thakur	338	1.95%	New
LRP	Bhagwat Guru	151	0.87%	New
Margin of victory		2,714	15.68%	▲14.64
Turnout		17,310	53.50%	▲3.09
Registered electors		33,104		▲22.47
INC hold		Swing	▲13.93	

=== Assembly Election 1967 ===
1967 Himachal Pradesh Legislative Assembly election: Inner Seraj
Party	Candidate	Votes	%	±%
INC	Dile Ram Shabab	4,327	32.53%	New
Independent	B. Ram	4,189	31.50%	New
Independent	M. Singh	4,187	31.48%	New
Independent	K. Chand	274	2.06%	New
Independent	N. Kishore	240	1.80%	New
CPI	H. Ram	83	0.62%	New
Margin of victory		138	1.04%	
Turnout		13,300	50.85%	
Registered electors		27,031		
INC win (new seat)				
