= Gopalpur Zoo =

Zoo in Gopalpur, Himachal Pradesh, India

- Location within Himachal Pradesh
- Location: Gopalpur Village, Tehsil Palampur, Himachal Pradesh, India
- Coordinates: 32.1389°0′0″N 76.449°0′0″E
- Area: 0.12 square kilometres (0.046 sq mi)
- Governing body: State Government of Himachal Pradesh
- Website: 164.100.155.49/pages/display/NXNkNGZohTY0ZjY1-zoosaviaries

Gopalpur Zoo is situated in Gopalpur village, Kangra district, Himachal Pradesh in India, en route the Dharmshala – Palampur road. It is surrounded by Dhauladhar Range of the Himalayas. The zoo is adorned with maple trees, horse chestnut trees, chil and greenery . The major attractions of the zoo are: Asiatic lion, leopard, Himalayan black bear, sambar deer, barking deer, goral, wild pigs, Bhutan Grey Peacocks, Cheer Pheasant, Red Jungle Fowl peacocks, vultures, eagles, etc.

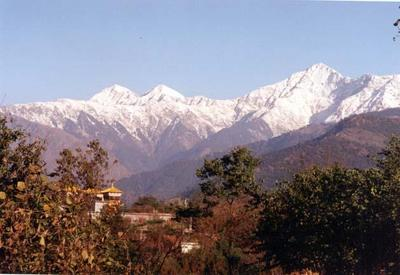
[Dhauladhar] range of the Himalayas from Kangra Valley

== See also ==
=== Zoos and Aviaries of Himachal Pradesh ===
There are three recognized zoological parks at Gopalpur, Renuka and Kufri and three aviaries at Shimla, Sarahan and Chail.

=== National Parks in Himachal Pradesh ===
1. Great Himalayan National Park, Kullu District: Area 765 km^{2}
2. Pin Valley National Park, Lahaul and Spiti district: Area 675 km^{2}
