= Shivlal Sharma =

Indian politician (died 2019)

MLA of Chachiot
- In office 1985–1990
- Preceded by: Moti Ram
- Succeeded by: Moti Ram

Personal details
- Born: 1938/39
- Died: 21 April 2019
- Party: Indian National Congress

Shivlal Sharma was an Indian politician belonging to Indian National Congress. He was elected as a member of Himachal Pradesh Legislative Assembly from Chachiot in 1985. He died of cardiac arrest on 21 April 2019 at the age of 80.
