= 1967 Himachal Pradesh Legislative Assembly election =

Indian state legislative election

- 21 February 1967

All 60 seats in the Himachal Pradesh Legislative Assembly 31 seats needed for a majority
- Registered: 1,582,103
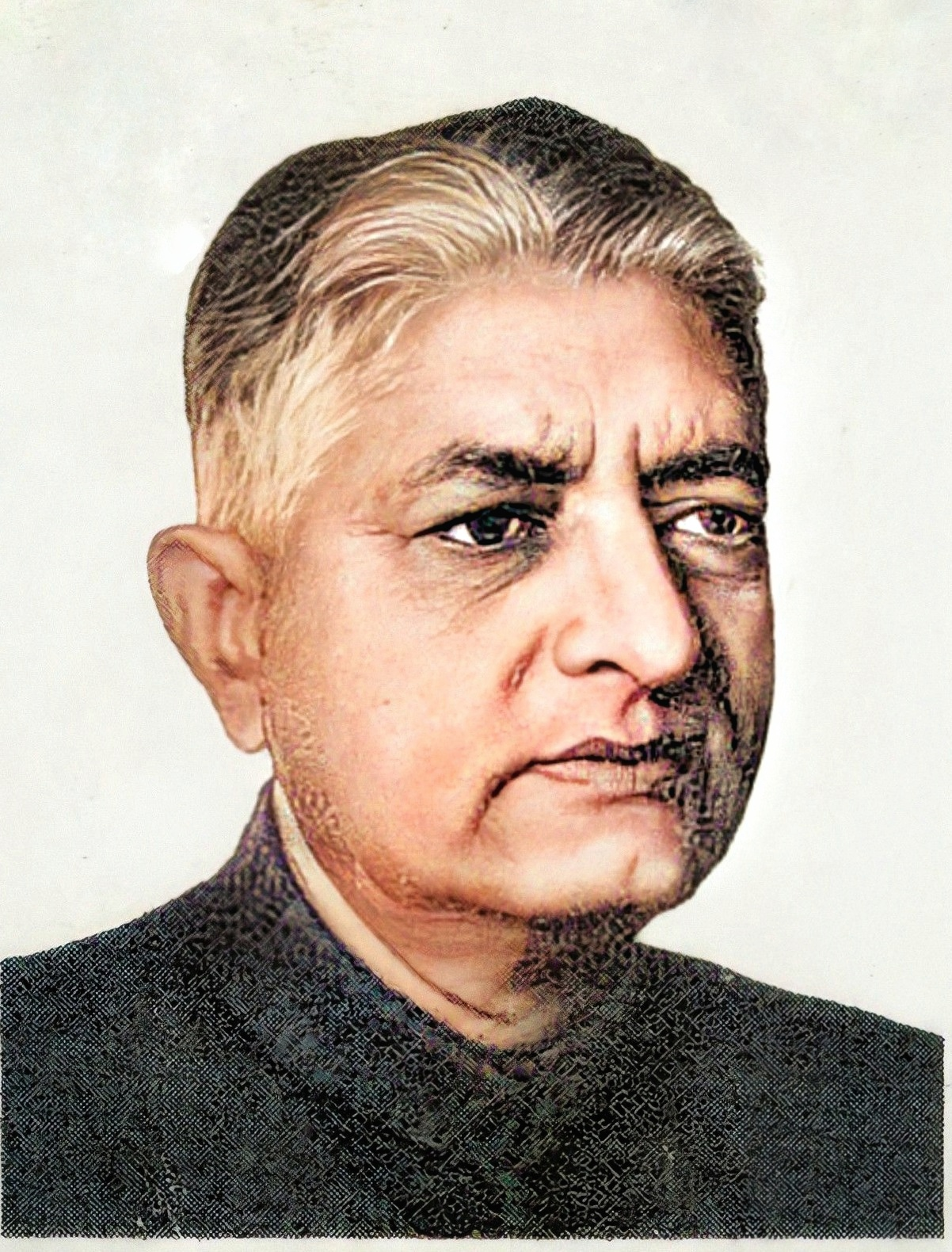

	Majority party	Minority party
Leader	Yashwant Singh Parmar
Party	INC	ABJS
Leader's seat	Rainka Assembly constituency
Seats won	34	7
Popular vote	53.24%	7.75%
CM before election
Yashwant Singh Parmar
INC
Elected CM
Yashwant Singh Parmar
INC

Elections to the Himachal Pradesh Legislative Assembly were held in February 1967 to elect members of the 60 constituencies in Himachal Pradesh, India. The Indian National Congress won the popular vote and a majority of seats and Yashwant Singh Parmar was re-appointed as the Chief Minister of Himachal Pradesh.

== State Reorganization ==
Previous legislative elections in Himachal Pradesh were held in 1952. But under States Reorganisation Act, 1956, Himachal Pradesh became a Union Territory on 1 November 1956, under the direct administration of the President of India and the Himachal Pradesh Legislative Assembly was abolished simultaneously. Under Punjab Reorganisation Act, 1966, following area of Punjab State namely Simla, Kangra, Kulu and Lahul and Spiti Districts, Nalagarh tehsil of Ambala District, Lohara, Amb and Una kanungo circles, some area of Santokhgarh kanungo circle and some other specified area of Una tehsil of Hoshiarpur District besides some parts of Dhar Kalan Kanungo circle of Pathankot tehsil of Gurdaspur District; were merged with Himachal Pradesh on 1 November 1966.

== Result ==
Party	Votes	%	Seats
Indian National Congress	323,247	42.19	34
Bharatiya Jana Sangh	106,261	13.87	7
Communist Party of India	22,173	2.89	2
Swatantra Party	14,767	1.93	1
Others	7,787	1.02	0
Independents	291,884	38.10	16
Total	766,119	100.00	60
Valid votes	766,119	94.54	
Invalid/blank votes	44,234	5.46	
Total votes	810,353	100.00	
Registered voters/turnout	1,582,103	51.22	
Source: ECI

== Elected members ==
#	Constituency	Reserved for (SC/ST/None)	Member	Party
1	Kinnaur	ST	T. S. Negi	Independent
2	Rampur	SC	N. Ram	Independent
3	Rohru	None	P. Dev	Indian National Congress
4	Jubbal	None	R. Lal	Indian National Congress
5	Chopal	None	K. Ram	Independent
6	Theog	None	J. B. L. Khachi	Independent
7	Kasumpti	None	S. Ram	Indian National Congress
8	Simla	None	D. Ram	Bharatiya Jana Sangh
9	Arki	None	H. S. Pal	Independent
10	Nalagarh	None	A. Singh	Independent
11	Doon	None	L. Ram	Independent
12	Solan	SC	K. Ram	Indian National Congress
13	Kandaghat	SC	N. Ram	Indian National Congress
14	Pachhad	SC	Z. Singh	Indian National Congress
15	Rainka	None	Y. S. Parmar	Indian National Congress
16	Paonta	None	G. S. Chauhan	Indian National Congress
17	Nahan	None	T. Singh	Indian National Congress
18	Bilaspur	None	D. R. Ehankhyan	Indian National Congress
19	Geharwin	SC	N. Ram	Indian National Congress
20	Ghumarwin	None	K. Singh	Indian National Congress
21	Bhota	None	D. Singh	Bharatiya Jana Sangh
22	Mewa	SC	A. Singh	Bharatiya Jana Sangh
23	Hamirpur	None	K. Ram	Bharatiya Jana Sangh
24	Nadaunta	None	A. Chand	Indian National Congress
25	Kutlehar	None	R. Singh	Independent
26	Santokhgarh	None	V. Sagar	Independent
27	Una	None	P. Chand	Independent
28	Amb	None	H. Ram	Indian National Congress
29	Gagret	SC	M. Singh	Indian National Congress
30	Nadaun	None	B. Ram	Independent
31	Jaswan	None	Paras Ram	Communist Party of India
32	Guler	None	Churamani	Independent
33	Dehra	None	V. Bhushan	Independent
34	Sullah	None	D. Chand	Bharatiya Jana Sangh
35	Rajgir	SC	Wazir	Indian National Congress
36	Baijnath	None	B. Ram	Communist Party of India
37	Palampur	None	K. B. Lal	Indian National Congress
38	Nagrota	None	Hardyal	Indian National Congress
39	Kangra	None	H. Ram	Indian National Congress
40	Dharamsala	None	R. K. Chand	Indian National Congress
41	Nurpur	None	K. Singh	Indian National Congress
42	Jawali	None	R. Chandra	Indian National Congress
43	Gangath	SC	D. Ram	Indian National Congress
44	Bhattiyat	None	Inder Singh	Bharatiya Jana Sangh
45	Banikhet	None	D. Raj	Indian National Congress
46	Rajnagar	SC	V. Dhar	Indian National Congress
47	Chamba	None	K. Lal	Bharatiya Jana Sangh
48	Bharmour	ST	R. Chand	Swatantra Party
49	Lahaul Spiti	ST	Devi Singh	Independent
50	Kulu	None	L. Chand	Indian National Congress
51	Inner Seraj	None	D. Ram	Indian National Congress
52	Outer Seraj	SC	I. Dass	Indian National Congress
53	Karsog	SC	Mansa	Independent
54	Chachiot	None	K. Singh	Indian National Congress
55	Sundernagar	None	L. Datt	Indian National Congress
56	Balh	SC	P. Ram	Indian National Congress
57	Gopalpur	None	H. Singh	Independent
58	Dharampur	None	K. Singh	Indian National Congress
59	Joginder Nagar	SC	G. Ram	Indian National Congress
60	Mandi	None	S. Ram	Indian National Congress

== See also ==
- List of constituencies of the Himachal Pradesh Legislative Assembly
- 1967 elections in India
