= Bhota Assembly constituency =

Constituency of the Himachal Pradesh legislative assembly in India

Coordinates: 31.610°N 76.569°E

Bhota
- Former constituency for the Himachal Pradesh Legislative Assembly

Constituency details
- Country: India
- Region: North India
- State: Himachal Pradesh
- Established: 1967
- Abolished: 1967
- Total electors: 25,016

Bhota Assembly constituency was an assembly constituency in the India state of Himachal Pradesh.

== Members of the Legislative Assembly ==
Election	Member	Party
1967	D. Singh	Bharatiya Jana Sangh

== Election results ==
=== Assembly Election 1967 ===
1967 Himachal Pradesh Legislative Assembly election: Bhota
Party	Candidate	Votes	%	±%
ABJS	D. Singh	5,790	45.29%	New
INC	C. Ram	5,554	43.44%	New
CPI	G. Dass	811	6.34%	New
Independent	P. Singh	630	4.93%	New
Margin of victory		236	1.85%	
Turnout		12,785	55.12%	
Registered electors		25,016		
ABJS win (new seat)				
