= Rangila Ram Rao =

Indian politician

Rangila Ram Rao, Vice President to the Himachal Pradesh Congress Committee (HPCC) and Member coordination panel of HP Congress (HPCC) & Planning Commission, H.P. (born on 3 April 1946) is an active member of Indian National Congress and Pradesh Congress Committee. A member of Congress since 1972, he has held many portfolios in the Government of Himachal Pradesh, India.

Rao was born in Gopalpur, Mandi District. He is a native speaker of Hindi and English. He received his B.A. and L.L.B from Punjab University, Chandigarh. During his college years, Rao was a political worker. When he acquired his law degree, he became an advocate providing free legal aid to the poor.

He was first elected as a Member of the Legislative Assembly in 1972, at the age of 26. He was then re-elected in 1977, 1982, 1985, 1993, 1998 and for the 7th time in 2003. In 1977 his margin of victory was highest in the country. Remained General Secretary of All India Congress Committee (A.I.C.C.) from 1977 to 1980.

He served as Chief Parliamentary Secretary (P.W.D & Health) from 1980 to 1982. He was then appointed Minister of State for Excise and Taxation, Health, Agriculture serving from 1982 to 1985. He was then re-appointed as Minister of State for Industries, Excise and Taxation, and Horticulture from 1987 to 1990. In 1993 he was appointed Cabinet Minister for Industries, Law, Parliamentary Affairs, Labour and Employment Training and served in that post until March, 1998. He also Served as the Member (A.I.C.C) and Chief-Spokesperson of Himachal Pradesh Congress Committee (HPCC) from 2000 to 2003. He was again appointed Cabinet Minister for Excise and Taxation, Social Justice & Empowerment, and Town and Country Planning on 6 March 2003 and served until 30 December 2007.

He was awarded with "Bharat Jyoti Award" in 2006. He remained an Executive member of the HPCC, Shimla, until July 2011 when he was elevated to the post of Permanent Invitee to the Himachal Pradesh Congress Committee (HPCC).

On 13 Feb 2014, he was appointed vice president and Member HPCC Co-ordination Committee to the Himachal Pradesh Congress Committee (HPCC).
