= Amb Assembly constituency =

Constituency of the Himachal Pradesh legislative assembly in India

Coordinates: 31.68°N 76.12°E

Amb
- Former constituency for the Himachal Pradesh Legislative Assembly

Constituency details
- Country: India
- Region: North India
- State: Himachal Pradesh
- District: Una
- Established: 1967
- Abolished: 1967
- Total electors: 31,820

Amb Assembly constituency was an assembly constituency in the India state of Himachal Pradesh.

== Members of the Legislative Assembly ==
| Election | Member | Party |
|---|---|---|
| 1967 | H. Ram | Indian National Congress |

== Election results ==
=== Assembly Election 1967 ===
1967 Himachal Pradesh Legislative Assembly election: Amb
| Party | Candidate | Votes | % | ±% |
|---|---|---|---|---|
| INC | H. Ram | 4,927 | 31.53% | New |
| Independent | H. Raj | 4,403 | 28.18% | New |
| Independent | B. Bal | 1,378 | 8.82% | New |
| Independent | Y. Singh | 1,066 | 6.82% | New |
| ABJS | S. Singh | 905 | 5.79% | New |
| Independent | P. Dav | 805 | 5.15% | New |
| Independent | R. Chander | 637 | 4.08% | New |
| Independent | S. Singh | 566 | 3.62% | New |
| Independent | D. Singh | 546 | 3.49% | New |
| Independent | B. Singh | 311 | 1.99% | New |
| Independent | T. Chand | 81 | 0.52% | New |
| Margin of victory | | 524 | 3.35% | |
| Turnout | | 15,625 | 53.09% | |
| Registered electors | | 31,820 | | |
| INC win (new seat) | | | | |
