= Gopalpur, Himachal Pradesh =

Gopalpur
- Village
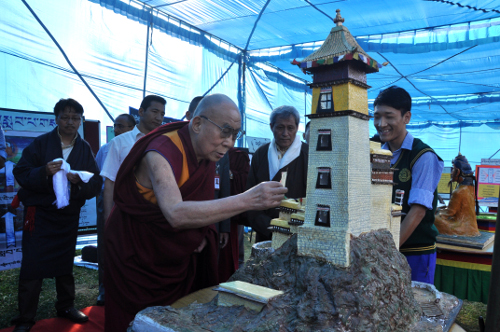
- The Dalai Lama on a visit to the Gopalpur TCV school

- Location in Himachal Pradesh, India Gopalpur (India)
- Coordinates: 32.1389°N 76.4490°E
- Country: India
- State: Himachal Pradesh
- District: Kangra
- Subdistrict: Bhawarna
- Time zone: UTC+05:30 (IST)
- Pincode: 176059
- Telephone code: 01894

Gopalpur is a village in Kangra district of Himachal Pradesh, India located near Palampur. There is also one branch school of the Tibetan Children's Village. Gopalpur is famous for its Gopalpur zoo.

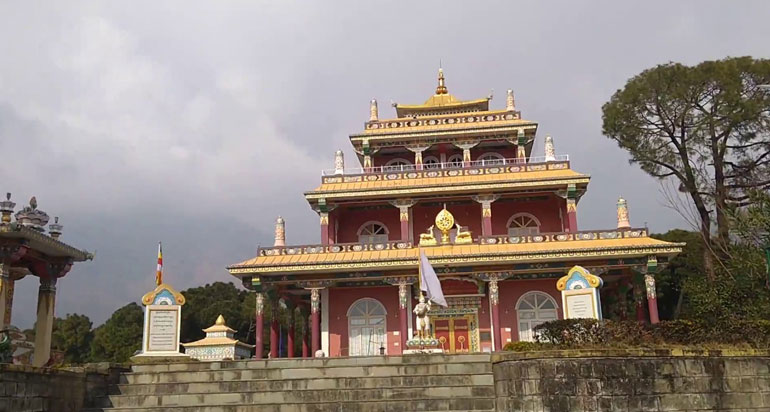
Dorzong Monastery

== Notable sites ==
- Chamunda Temple
- Gyuto Monastery
- Norbulingka Institute
