= Bhawarna =

Coordinates: 32°03′N 76°35′E

- Village
- Interactive map of Bhawarna
- Country: India
- State: Himachal Pradesh
- District: Kangra
- Time zone: UTC+5:30 (IST)
- Pin Code: 176083

Bhawarna is a town in Kangra district, Himachal Pradesh, India. 11 kilometres (6.8 mi) from Palampur.

== Overview ==
Bhawarna Khas is a city located in Bhawarna sub Tehsil of Kangra district, Himachal Pradesh with total thousands of families residing. The Bhawarna Khas has population of 1,393686 of which 69545 are males, while 69878 are females as per Population Census in 2011.

In Bhawarna Khas, population of children with age 0-6 is 13685 which makes up 9.69 % of total population. Average Sex Ratio of Bhawarna Khas is 1,004 which is higher than Himachal Pradesh state acreage of 972. Child Sex Ratio for the Bhawarna Khas as per census is 1,143-- higher than Himachal Pradesh average of 909.

In 2011, literacy rate of Bhawarna Khas was 89.83 % compared to 82.80 % of Himachal Pradesh. In Bhawarna Khas, male literacy stands at 92.88 % while female literacy rate was 86.74 %. Schedule Caste (SC) constitutes 21.03 %, while Schedule Tribe (ST) were 1.15 % of total population in Bhawarna Khas.

Bhawarna also has a government Senior Secondary school, which is one of the oldest and well developed with well and good infrastructure and talented teachers in the nearby region, and several private schools.
