= 1993 Himachal Pradesh Legislative Assembly election =

Indian state legislative election

← 1990	11 September 1993	1998 →

All 68 seats in the Himachal Pradesh Legislative Assembly 35 seats needed for a majority
- Registered: 3,277,625
- Turnout: 71.50%
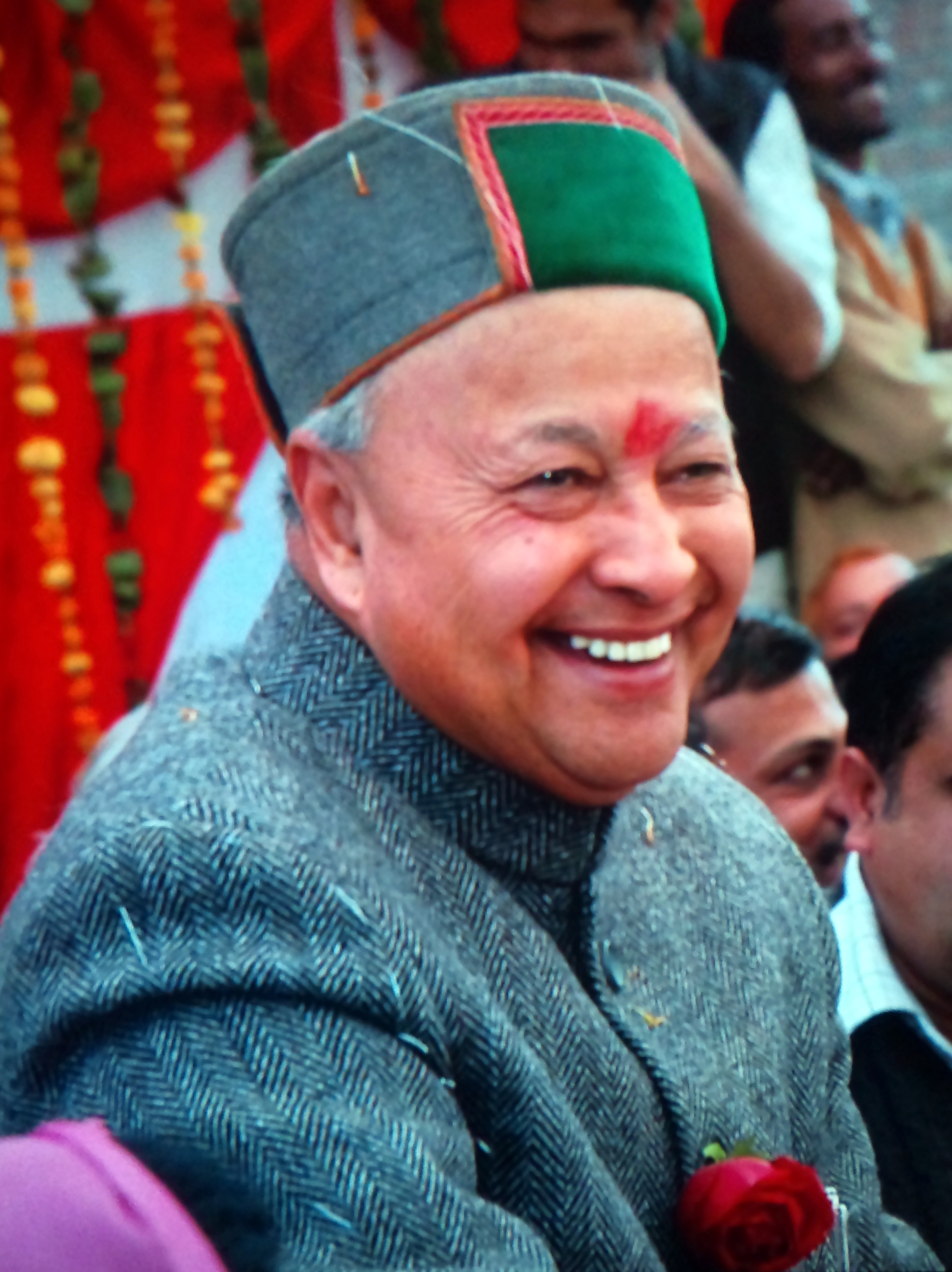

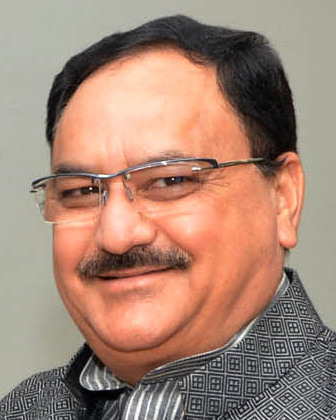
	Majority party	Minority party
Leader	Virbhadra Singh	J. P. Nadda
Party	INC	BJP
Seats before	9	46
Seats won	52	8
Seat change	▲43	▼38
Popular vote	1,135,203	840,233
Percentage	48.82%	36.13%
Swing	▲12.28%	▼5.65%
CM before election
President's rule
Elected CM
Virbhadra Singh
INC

Elections to the Himachal Pradesh Legislative Assembly were held in September 1993 to elect members of the 68 constituencies in Himachal Pradesh, India. The Indian National Congress won the popular vote and a majority of seats and its leader, Virbhadra Singh was appointed as the Chief Minister of Himachal Pradesh for his second term. The number of constituencies was set as 68 by the recommendation of the Delimitation Commission of India.

The Himachal Pradesh Legislative Assembly or the Himachal Pradesh Vidhan Sabha is the unicameral legislature of the Indian state of Himachal Pradesh. The present strength of the Vidhan Sabha is 68.

== Parties and alliances ==
=== Bharatiya Janata Party ===
Party	Flag	Symbol	Leader	Contesting Seats
Bharatiya Janata Party			J. P. Nadda	67

=== Indian National Congress ===
Party	Flag	Symbol	Leader	Contesting Seats
Indian National Congress			Virbhadra Singh	68

== Result ==
Party	Votes	%	Seats	+/–
Indian National Congress	1,135,203	48.82	52	▲43
Bharatiya Janata Party	840,233	36.13	8	▼38
Communist Party of India (Marxist)	17,347	0.75	1	▲1
Others	105,475	4.54	0	0
Independents	227,050	9.76	7	▲6
Total	2,325,308	100.00	68	0
Valid votes	2,325,308	99.22		
Invalid/blank votes	18,305	0.78		
Total votes	2,343,613	100.00		
Registered voters/turnout	3,277,625	71.50		
Source: ECI

== Elected members ==
Constituency	Reserved for (SC/ST/None)	Member	Party	Vote	Runner-up Candidates Name	Party	vote
Kinnaur	ST	Dev Raj Negi	Indian National Congress	13746	Thakur Sen Negi	Bharatiya Janata Party	12864
Rampur	SC	Singhi Ram	Indian National Congress	24116	Ninzoo Ram	Bharatiya Janata Party	9638
Rohru	None	Virbhadra Singh	Indian National Congress	26976	Khushi Ram Balnath	Bharatiya Janata Party	7030
Jubbal-kotkhai	None	Ram Lal	Indian National Congress	21745	Rajpal Singh Chauhan	Independent	4922
Chopal	None	Yogendra Chandra	Independent	16796	Kanwar Uday Singh	Indian National Congress	6490
Kumarsain	None	Jai Bihari Lal Khachi	Indian National Congress	21612	Bhagat Ram Chauhan	Bharatiya Janata Party	10987
Theog	None	Rakesh Verma	Bharatiya Janata Party	18088	Vidya Stokes	Indian National Congress	16684
Simla	None	Rakesh Singha	Communist Party of India	11854	Harbhajan Singh Bhajji	Indian National Congress	11695
Kasumpti	SC	Charanjiv Lal Kashyap	Indian National Congress	20688	Roup Dass Kashyap	Bharatiya Janata Party	14455
Arki	None	Dharam Pal	Indian National Congress	17077	Nagin Chander Pal	Bharatiya Janata Party	11350
Doon	None	Lajja Ram	Indian National Congress	14622	Ram Partap Chandel	Independent	14059
Nalagarh	None	Vijyendra Singh	Indian National Congress	17969	Kehar Singh	Bharatiya Janata Party	12273
Kasauli	SC	Raghu Raj	Indian National Congress	16750	Virender Kashyap	Bharatiya Janata Party	10956
Solan	None	Krishna Mohini	Indian National Congress	23177	Mohinder Nath Sofat	Bharatiya Janata Party	11583
Pachhad	SC	Gangu Ram Musafir	Indian National Congress	19021	Ram Parkash	Bharatiya Janata Party	12649
Rainka	SC	Prem Singh	Indian National Congress	15500	Mohan Lal Azad	Bharatiya Janata Party	11786
Shillai	None	Harsh Vardhan	Indian National Congress	19092	Jagat Singh Negi	Bharatiya Janata Party	12254
Paonta Doon	None	Rattan Singh	Indian National Congress	21238	Fateh Singh	Bharatiya Janata Party	15648
Nahan	None	Kush Parmar	Indian National Congress	15922	Shyam Sharma	Janata Dal	9070
Kotkehloor	None	Ram Lal Thakur	Indian National Congress	18985	Krishan Kumar Kaushal	Communist Party of India	10245
Bilaspur	None	Jagat Prakash Nadda	Bharatiya Janata Party	17500	Babu Ram Gautam	Indian National Congress	15274
Ghumarwin	None	Kashmir Singh	Indian National Congress	20603	Karam Dev Dharmani	Bharatiya Janata Party	15019
Geharwin	SC	Beeru Ram Kishore	Indian National Congress	20604	Kondal Rihi Ram	Bharatiya Janata Party	13304
Nadaun	None	Narain Chand Prashar	Indian National Congress	15571	Raghubir Singh	Bharatiya Janata Party	14506
Hamirpur	None	Jagdev Chand	Bharatiya Janata Party	17559	Anita Verma	Indian National Congress	16413
Bamsan	None	Kuldeep Singh Pathania	Indian National Congress	13657	Lashkari Ram	Bharatiya Janata Party	13442
Mewa	SC	Ishwar Dass Dhiman	Bharatiya Janata Party	17134	Neeraj Kumar	Indian National Congress	16687
Nadaunta	None	Manjit Singh	Independent	11821	Ram Rattan Sharma	Bharatiya Janata Party	11650
Gagret	SC	Kuldeep Kumar	Indian National Congress	18059	Sadhu Ram	Bharatiya Janata Party	10871
Chintpurni	None	Hari Datt	Independent	14060	Ganesh Datt Bharwal	Indian National Congress	8247
Santokgarh	None	Vijay Kumar Joshi	Indian National Congress	13292	Kashmiri Lal Joshi	Bharatiya Janata Party	10061
Una	None	O.p. Rattan	Indian National Congress	14014	Virender Gautam	Independent	13212
Kutlehar	None	Ram Dass Malangar	Bharatiya Janata Party	14846	Ram Nath Sharma	Indian National Congress	13874
Nurpur	None	Sat Mahajan	Indian National Congress	28961	Megh Raj Awasthi	Bharatiya Janata Party	13870
Gangath	SC	Durga Dass	Indian National Congress	16036	Des Raj	Bharatiya Janata Party	13448
Jawali	None	Sujan Singh Pathania	Indian National Congress	19409	Rajan Sushant	Bharatiya Janata Party	17773
Guler	None	Chander Kumar	Indian National Congress	19051	Harbans Rana	Bharatiya Janata Party	10308
Jaswan	None	Viplove Thakur	Indian National Congress	16283	Kashmir Singh Rana	Bharatiya Janata Party	8523
Pragpur	SC	Virender Kumar	Bharatiya Janata Party	13685	Yog Raj	Independent	11968
Jawalamukhi	None	Kewal Singh	Indian National Congress	16558	Dhani Ram	Bharatiya Janata Party	13569
Thural	None	Ravinder Singh Ravi	Bharatiya Janata Party	13685	Kanwar Durga Chand	Independent	12764
Rajgir	SC	Milkhi Ram Goma	Indian National Congress	16035	Atma Ram	Bharatiya Janata Party	11090
Baijnath	None	Sant Ram	Indian National Congress	18276	Dulo Ram	Bharatiya Janata Party	13477
Palampur	None	Brij Bihari Lal	Indian National Congress	21212	Shiv Kumar	Bharatiya Janata Party	14702
Sulah	None	Man Chand Rana	Indian National Congress	16745	Shanta Kumar	Bharatiya Janata Party	13478
Nagrota	None	Hardyal Choudhary	Independent	19085	Chaudhary Ram Chand	Bharatiya Janata Party	10366
Shahpur	None	Vijay Singh Mankotia	Indian National Congress	17972	Sarveen Choudhary	Bharatiya Janata Party	16691
Dharamsala	None	Kishan Kapoor	Bharatiya Janata Party	11950	Chandresh Kumari	Indian National Congress	11533
Kangra	None	Daulat Ram	Indian National Congress	20658	Vidya Sagar	Bharatiya Janata Party	14342
Bhattiyat	None	Kuldeep Singh	Independent	13595	Brij Lal	Bharatiya Janata Party	8681
Banikhet	None	Asha Kumari	Indian National Congress	19079	Gandharv Singh	Bharatiya Janata Party	13673
Rajnagar	SC	Vidhya Dhar	Indian National Congress	18563	Mohan Lal	Bharatiya Janata Party	13919
Chamba	None	Harsh Mahajan	Indian National Congress	20435	Kishori Lal	Bharatiya Janata Party	13585
Bharmour	ST	Thakar Singh	Independent	10225	Tulshi Ram	Bharatiya Janata Party	8948
Lahaul And Spiti	ST	Phunchog Rai	Indian National Congress	6509	Hishe Dogia	Bharatiya Janata Party	5067
Kulu	None	Raj Krishan Gour	Indian National Congress	29077	Kunj Lal	Bharatiya Janata Party	20423
Banjar	None	Satya Parkash Thakur	Indian National Congress	24539	Karan Singh	Bharatiya Janata Party	22518
Ani	SC	Ishwar Dass	Indian National Congress	20436	Tej Ram	Bharatiya Janata Party	18320
Karsog	SC	Mast Ram	Indian National Congress	19371	Joginder Pal	Bharatiya Janata Party	9144
Chachiot	None	Moti Ram	Indian National Congress	9944	Jai Ram	Bharatiya Janata Party	7993
Nachan	SC	Tek Chand	Independent	20120	Dile Ram	Bharatiya Janata Party	12814
Sundernagar	None	Sher Singh	Indian National Congress	16380	Roop Singh	Bharatiya Janata Party	10843
Balh	SC	Nek Ram	Indian National Congress	19050	Damodar Dass	Bharatiya Janata Party	14860
Gopalpur	None	Rangila Ram Rao	Indian National Congress	25960	Randhir Singh Chamdel	Bharatiya Janata Party	12552
Dharampur	None	Mahender Singh	Indian National Congress	20065	Preay Brat	Bharatiya Janata Party	11737
Joginder Nagar	None	Gulab Singh	Indian National Congress	18412	Ganga Ram Jamwal	Bharatiya Janata Party	11070
Darang	None	Kaul Singh	Indian National Congress	22482	Dina Nath	Bharatiya Janata Party	15848
Mandi	None	Anil Sharma	Indian National Congress	23134	Kanhaiya Lal	Bharatiya Janata Party	10712

== By-elections ==
- Shri Adarsh Kumar Sood was elected in a by-election caused by the unseating of the sitting Member Shri Rakesh Singha from Shimla.
- Smt. Anita Verma was elected in a by-election caused at the demise of Shri Jagdev Chand who died immediately after the declaration of results.
- Shri Durga Chand was elected in a by-election in 1995 from Sulah at the death of Shri Man Chand Rana.
- Shri Jagat Singh Negi was elected in a by-election in 1995 at the death of the sitting MLA Shri Dev Raj Negi.
- Shri Ranjeet Singh Bakshi was elected in October, 1996 in a by-election. The vacancy was caused due to the election of the then sitting Member Shri Sat Mahajan to Lok Sabha.

== See also ==
- List of constituencies of the Assam Legislative Assembly
- 1993 elections in India
- Government of Himachal Pradesh
