= 1985 Himachal Pradesh Legislative Assembly election =

Indian state legislative election

← 1982	1985	1990 →

68 seats in the Himachal Pradesh Legislative Assembly 35 seats needed for a majority
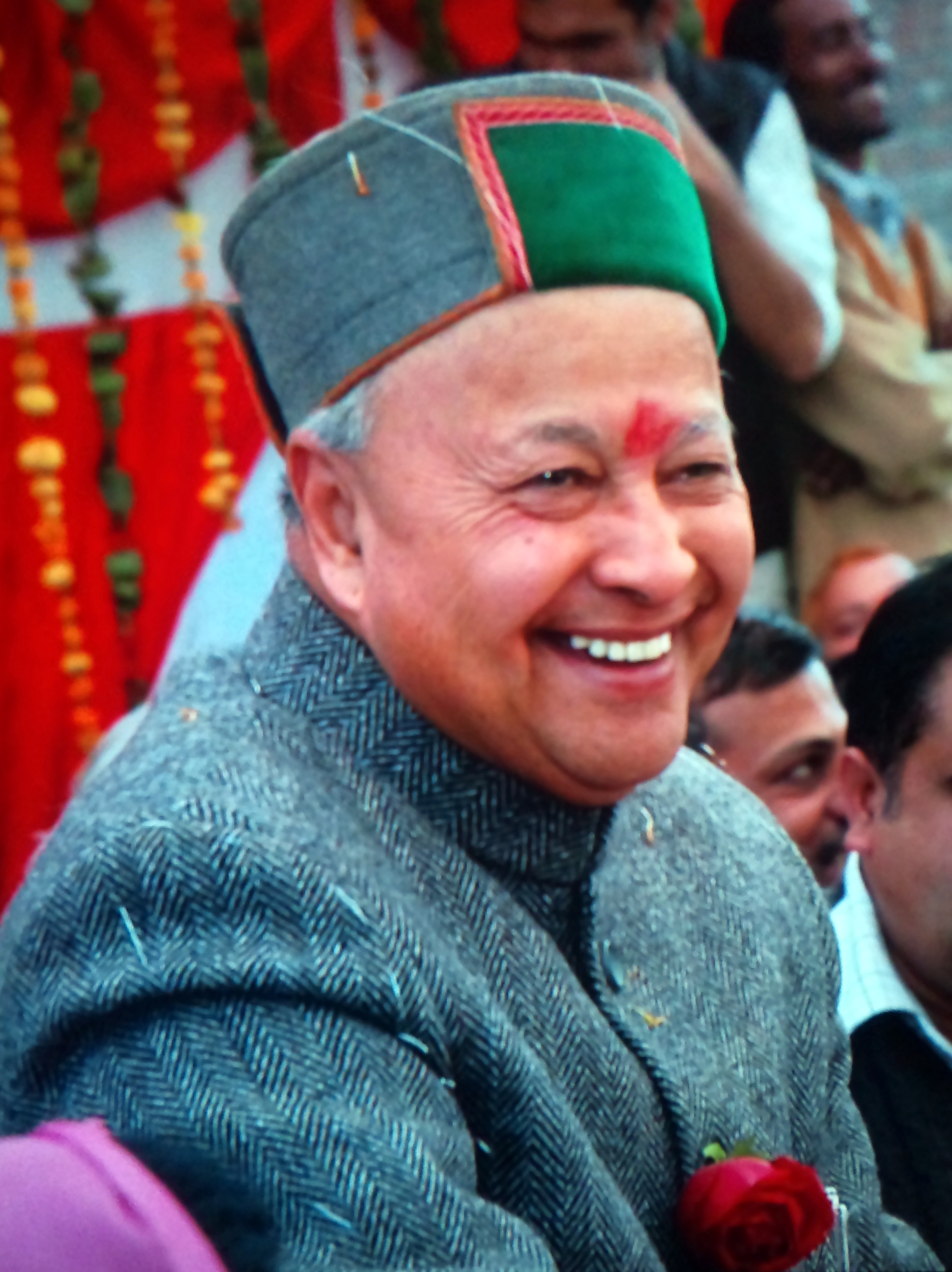

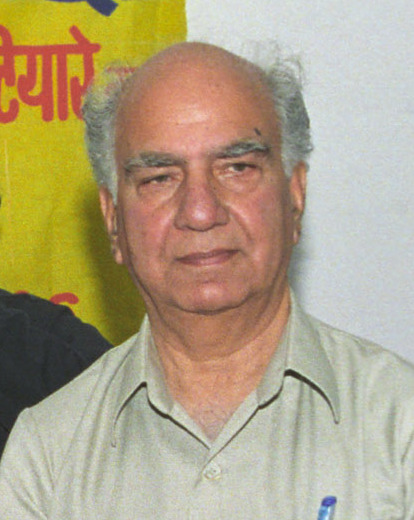
	Majority party	Minority party
Leader	Virbhadra Singh	Shanta Kumar
Party	INC	BJP
Seats won	58	7
Seat change	▲27	▼22
Popular vote	55.86%	35.87%
CM before election
Virbhadra Singh
INC
Elected CM
Virbhadra Singh
INC

Legislative Assembly elections were held in Himachal Pradesh in 1985. As of 2022, this is the last time an incumbent party retained control of the legislative assembly in Himachal Pradesh.

== Results ==
Rank	Party	Seats Contested	Seats won	% votes
1	Indian National Congress	68	58	55.86
2	Bharatiya Janata Party	57	7	35.87
3	Independents	68	2	8.28
4	Lok Dal	3	1	1.44
	Total		68	

Source: STATISTICAL REPORT ON GENERAL ELECTION, 1985 TO THE LEGISLATIVE ASSEMBLY OF HIMACHAL PRADESH

== Constituency wise Results ==
=== List of Successful Candidates in Himachal Pradesh Assembly Election in 1985 ===
A. C. NO.	Assembly Constituency Name	Category	Winner Candidates Name	Party	Vote	Runner-up Candidates Name	Party	Vote
1	Kinnaur	(ST)	Dev Raj Negi	Indian National Congress	12859	Thakursen Negi	Independent	10843
2	Rampur	(SC)	Singhi Ram	Indian National Congress	19033	Ninzoo Ram	Lok Dal	4461
3	Rohru	GEN	Nehar Singh	Indian National Congress	22282	Partap Singh Mukhiya	Bharatiya Janata Party	3321
4	Jubbal-Kotkhai	GEN	Virbhadra Singh	Indian National Congress	20125	Prakash Chand	Independent	2667
5	Chopal	GEN	Yogindra Chand	Indian National Congress	16221	Kewal Ram Chauhan	Independent	6229
6	Kumarsain	GEN	Jai Bihari Lal Khachi	Indian National Congress	14016	Bhagat Ram Chauhan	Bharatiya Janata Party	9456
7	Theog	GEN	Vidya Stokes	Indian National Congress	13941	Mehar Singh Chauhan	Janata Party	10416
8	Simla	GEN	Harbhajan Singh	Indian National Congress	8825	Radha Raman Shastri	Bharatiya Janata Party	8195
9	Kasumpti	(SC)	Shonkia Ram Kashyap	Indian National Congress	12801	Balak Ram	Bharatiya Janata Party	8819
10	Arki	GEN	Hira Singh Pal	Indian National Congress	13554	Nagin Chander Pal	Bharatiya Janata Party	7142
11	Doon	GEN	Ram Pratap Chandel	Indian National Congress	11878	Lekh Ram	Independent	10494
12	Nalagarh	GEN	Vijayendra Singh	Indian National Congress	22284	Kehar Singh	Independent	5237
13	Kasauli	(SC)	Raghu Raj	Indian National Congress	9514	Chaman Lal	Independent	6593
14	Solan	GEN	Gian Chand Totu	Indian National Congress	15117	Rama Nand	Bharatiya Janata Party	4995
15	Pachhad	(SC)	Gangu Ram	Indian National Congress	17485	Shiv Ram	Bharatiya Janata Party	5280
16	Rainka	(SC)	Prem Singh	Indian National Congress	13968	Mohan Lal	Bharatiya Janata Party	5564
17	Shillai	GEN	Guman Singh Chauhan	Indian National Congress	15852	Jagat Singh Negi	Lok Dal	6319
18	Paonta Doon	GEN	Kush Parmar	Indian National Congress	15203	Karam Chand	Bharatiya Janata Party	10429
19	Nahan	GEN	Ajay Bahadur Singh	Indian National Congress	12864	Shyama Sharma	Janata Party	11065
20	Kotkehloor	GEN	Ram Lal Thakur	Indian National Congress	11183	Krishan Kumar Kaushal	Communist Party of India	10739
21	Bilaspur	GEN	Babu Ram Gautam	Indian National Congress	11125	Sada Ram Thakur	Bharatiya Janata Party	10757
22	Ghumarwin	GEN	Kashmir Singh	Indian National Congress	13694	Jagdish Ram Sharma	Bharatiya Janata Party	10528
23	Geharwin	(SC)	Rikhi Ram Kondal	Bharatiya Janata Party	12477	Biru Ram Kishore	Indian National Congress	9856
24	Nadaun	GEN	Prem Dass Pakhrolvi	Indian National Congress	12788	Dhani Ram	Bharatiya Janata Party	8512
25	Hamirpur	GEN	Jagdev Chand	Bharatiya Janata Party	12753	Bidhi Chand	Indian National Congress	11286
26	Bamsan	GEN	Karam Singh	Indian National Congress	12513	Pirthi Singh	Bharatiya Janata Party	9837
27	Mewa	(SC)	Dharam Singh	Indian National Congress	13437	Mela Ram	Bharatiya Janata Party	11512
28	Nadaunta	GEN	Manjit Singh	Indian National Congress	14692	Ram Rattan Sharma	Bharatiya Janata Party	10387
29	Gagret	(SC)	Milkhi Ram	Indian National Congress	13664	Sadhu Ram	Bharatiya Janata Party	8460
30	Chintpurni	GEN	Ganesh Dutt	Indian National Congress	9864	Gulwant Singh	Bharatiya Janata Party	7839
31	Santokgarh	GEN	Vijay Kumar Joshi	Indian National Congress	15591	Kashmiri Lal	Bharatiya Janata Party	15062
32	Una	GEN	Virender Gautam	Indian National Congress	13463	Des Raj	Bharatiya Janata Party	11826
33	Kutlehar	GEN	Ramnath Sharma	Indian National Congress	13766	Ranjit Singh	Janata Party	9714
34	Nurpur	GEN	Sat Mahajan	Indian National Congress	19643	Megh Raj	Bharatiya Janata Party	11460
35	Gangath	(SC)	Girdhari Lal	Indian National Congress	10711	Des Raj	Bharatiya Janata Party	9074
36	Jawali	GEN	Rajan Sushant	Bharatiya Janata Party	14040	Sujan Singh Pathania	Indian National Congress	13684
37	Guler	GEN	Chander Kumar	Indian National Congress	12223	Harbans Singh Rana	Bharatiya Janata Party	9022
38	Jaswan	GEN	Viplove Thakur	Indian National Congress	15163	Gian Singh	Bharatiya Janata Party	5674
39	Pragpur	(SC)	Yog Raj	Indian National Congress	12272	Varinder Kumar	Bharatiya Janata Party	11512
40	Jawalamukhi	GEN	Ishwar Chand	Independent	8050	Sushil Chand	Indian National Congress	8041
41	Thural	GEN	Durga Chand	Lok Dal	12775	Kartar Singh	Indian National Congress	5295
42	Rajgir	(SC)	Milkhi Ram Goma	Indian National Congress	10646	Atma Ram	Bharatiya Janata Party	7306
43	Baijnath	GEN	Sant Ram	Indian National Congress	13767	Dulo Ram	Bharatiya Janata Party	9462
44	Palampur	GEN	Brij Behari Lal	Indian National Congress	11722	Sarwan Kumar	Bharatiya Janata Party	9137
45	Sullah	GEN	Man Chand	Indian National Congress	11018	Shanta Kumar	Bharatiya Janata Party	10557
46	Nagrota	GEN	Ram Chand	Bharatiya Janata Party	12530	Hardyal	Indian National Congress	12158
47	Shahpur	GEN	Vijay Singh	Indian National Congress	15956	Ram Rattan	Bharatiya Janata Party	9094
48	Dharamsala	GEN	Mool Raj Padha	Indian National Congress	10663	Kishan Chand	Bharatiya Janata Party	9580
49	Kangra	GEN	Vidya Sagar	Bharatiya Janata Party	13443	Pushpa Chaudhary	Indian National Congress	10800
50	Bhattiyat	GEN	Kuldip Singh Pathania	Indian National Congress	10374	Shiv Kumar	Independent	8430
51	Banikhet	GEN	Asha Kumari	Indian National Congress	12891	Daulat Ram Nirdoshi	Communist Party of India	5236
52	Rajnagar	(SC)	Nand Kumar Chauhan	Indian National Congress	13026	Mohan Lal	Bharatiya Janata Party	10759
53	Chamba	GEN	Sagar Chand Nayar	Indian National Congress	13278	Kishori Lal	Bharatiya Janata Party	9946
54	Bharmour	(ST)	Thakur Singh	Indian National Congress	10689	Tulsi Ram	Bharatiya Janata Party	7030
55	Lahaul and Spiti	(ST)	Devi Singh	Indian National Congress	8646	Shiv Chand Thakur	Independent	331
56	Kullu	GEN	Raj Krishan Gour	Indian National Congress	20685	Chander Sain Thakur	Bharatiya Janata Party	12542
57	Banjar	GEN	Satya Parkash Thakur	Indian National Congress	17383	Maheshwar Singh	Bharatiya Janata Party	16816
58	Anni	(SC)	Ishwar Dass	Indian National Congress	16106	Khub Ram	Bharatiya Janata Party	12123
59	Karsog	(SC)	Joginder Pal	Bharatiya Janata Party	11925	Mansha Ram	Indian National Congress	8540
60	Chachiot	GEN	Shiv Lal	Indian National Congress	12958	Moti Ram	Independent	11074
61	Nachan	(SC)	Tek Chand	Indian National Congress	14039	Dile Ram (Mahadev)	Bharatiya Janata Party	8332
62	Sundernagar	GEN	Roop Singh	Bharatiya Janata Party	10220	Dharm Dutt	Indian National Congress	8492
63	Balh	(SC)	Piru Ram	Indian National Congress	12719	Damoder Dass	Bharatiya Janata Party	12440
64	Gopalpur	GEN	Rangila Ram	Indian National Congress	18423	Leela Sharma	Bharatiya Janata Party	7586
65	Dharampur	GEN	Natha Singh	Indian National Congress	13713	Om Chand	Bharatiya Janata Party	6023
66	Joginder Nagar	GEN	Ratan Lal	Independent	12790	Gulab Singh	Indian National Congress	10075
67	Darang	GEN	Kaul Singh	Indian National Congress	17344	Dina Nath	Bharatiya Janata Party	8498
68	Mandi	GEN	Durga Dutt	Indian National Congress	12166	Kanhya Lal	Bharatiya Janata Party	10884
