= 1982 Himachal Pradesh Legislative Assembly election =

Indian state legislative election

← 1977	19 May 1982	1985 →

All 68 seats in the Himachal Pradesh Legislative Assembly 35 seats needed for a majority
- Registered: 2,211,524
- Turnout: 71.06%
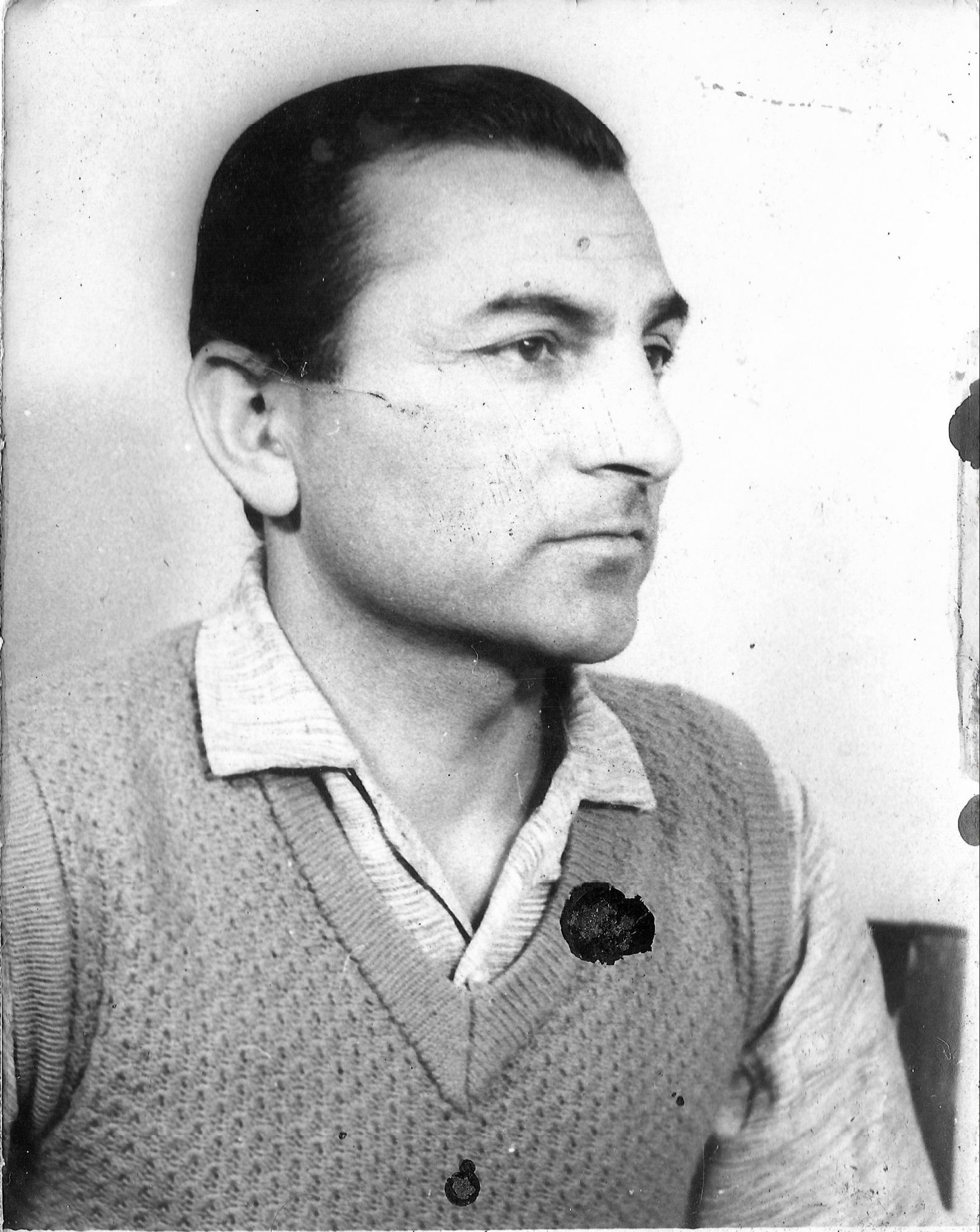

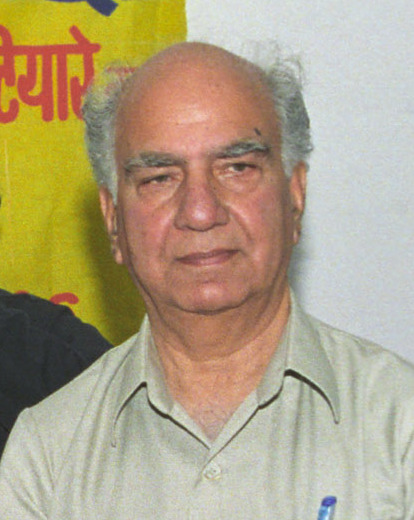
	Majority party	Minority party	Third party
Leader	Thakur Ram Lal	Shanta Kumar
Party	INC	BJP	JP
Leader's seat	Jubbal-Kotkhai
Seats before	9	New	53
Seats won	31	29	2
Seat change	▲22	New	▼51
Popular vote	42.52%	35.16%	4.75%
CM before election
Thakur Ram Lal
INC
Elected CM
Thakur Ram Lal
INC

Elections to the Himachal Pradesh Legislative Assembly were held in May 1982, to elect members of the 68 constituencies in Himachal Pradesh, India. The Indian National Congress won the most seats as well as the popular vote, and Thakur Ram Lal was reappointed as the Chief Minister of Himachal Pradesh.

After the passing of the State of Himachal Pradesh Act, 1970, Himachal Pradesh was converted from a Union Territory to a State and the size of its Legislative Assembly was increased to 68 members.

== Result ==
Party	Votes	%	Seats	+/–
Indian National Congress	659,239	42.52	31	▲22
Bharatiya Janata Party	545,037	35.16	29	New
Janata Party	73,683	4.75	2	▼51
Communist Party of India	26,543	1.71	0	0
Lok Dal	22,521	1.45	0	New
Communist Party of India (Marxist)	2,636	0.17	0	0
Independents	220,637	14.23	6	0
Total	1,550,296	100.00	68	0
Valid votes	1,550,296	98.65		
Invalid/blank votes	21,278	1.35		
Total votes	1,571,574	100.00		
Registered voters/turnout	2,211,524	71.06		
Source: ECI

== Elected members ==
Constituency	Reserved for (SC/ST/None)	Member	Party	Votes	Runner-up Candidates Name	Party	Votes
Kinnaur	ST	Thakur Sen Negi	Independent	12580	Gopi Chand	Indian National Congress	9197
Rampur	SC	Singhi Ram	Indian National Congress	12776	Ninzoo Ram	Independent	6285
Rohru	None	Satya Dev Bushehari	Indian National Congress	11890	Pratap Singh Mukhia	Bharatiya Janata Party	6743
Jubbal-kotkhai	None	Ram Lal	Indian National Congress	20765	Shyam Lal Pirta	Bharatiya Janata Party	3340
Chopal	None	Kewal Ram Chauhan	Indian National Congress	12307	Radha Raman Shastri	Bharatiya Janata Party	8013
Kumarsain	None	Jai Bihari Lal Khachi	Indian National Congress	9641	Bhagat Ram Chauhan	Bharatiya Janata Party	4902
Theog	None	Vidya Stokes	Indian National Congress	12947	Mehar Singh Chauhan	Janata Party	8052
Simla	None	Daulat Ram	Bharatiya Janata Party	12314	Anand Sharma	Indian National Congress	9369
Kasumpti	SC	Balak Ram Kashyap	Bharatiya Janata Party	8594	Roop Dass Kashyap	Indian National Congress	7236
Arki	None	Nagin Chander Pal	Bharatiya Janata Party	8764	Hira Singh	Indian National Congress	6545
Doon	None	Ram Partap Chandel	Indian National Congress	12236	Narain Dass	Bharatiya Janata Party	5239
Nalagarh	None	Vijayander Singh	Indian National Congress	16500	Arjun Singh	Independent	7259
Kasauli	SC	Raghu Raj	Indian National Congress	9672	Kirpal Singh	Janata Party	3268
Solan	None	Rama Nand	Bharatiya Janata Party	6253	Guru Dutt	Independent	3437
Pachhad	SC	Gangu Ram	Independent	9805	Uchhbu Ram	Bharatiya Janata Party	5143
Raindka	SC	Prem Singh	Indian National Congress	10466	Mohan Lal	Janata Party	4910
Shillai	None	Guman Singh Chauhan	Indian National Congress	12042	Jagat Singh	Lok Dal	9381
Paonta Doon	None	Kush Parmar	Indian National Congress	10099	Milk Raj	Bharatiya Janata Party	7747
Nahan	None	Shyama Sharma	Janata Party	12926	Sunder Singh	Indian National Congress	6032
Kotkehloor	None	Daulat Ram Sankhyan	Indian National Congress	6400	Daulat Ram Sharma	Bharatiya Janata Party	5861
Bilaspur	None	Sada Ram Thakur	Bharatiya Janata Party	10445	Partap Singh	Indian National Congress	8957
Ghumarwin	None	Narayan Singh Swami	Bharatiya Janata Party	11836	Sita Ram Sharma	Indian National Congress	11350
Geharwin	SC	Ganu Ram	Bharatiya Janata Party	7477	Rikhi Ram Kaundal	Independent	6901
Nadaun	None	Dhani Ram	Bharatiya Janata Party	9308	Prem Dass Sharma	Indian National Congress	7478
Hamirpur	None	Jagdev Chand	Bharatiya Janata Party	14471	Babu Ram	Indian National Congress	7857
Bamsan	None	Lashkari Ram	Bharatiya Janata Party	12862	Ranjit Singh	Indian National Congress	9788
Mewa	SC	Dharam Singh	Indian National Congress	11814	Amar Singh	Bharatiya Janata Party	9924
Nadaunta	None	Ram Rattan Sharma	Bharatiya Janata Party	10365	Prem Chand Verma	Indian National Congress	8622
Gagret	SC	Sadhu Ram	Bharatiya Janata Party	11377	Mehnga Singh	Indian National Congress	9906
Chintpurni	None	Hans Raj Akrot	Indian National Congress	9904	Romesh Chander	Bharatiya Janata Party	8199
Santokgarh	None	Vijay Kumar Joshi	Indian National Congress	10589	Kashmiri Lal Joshi	Independent	9371
Una	None	Des Raj	Bharatiya Janata Party	14707	Ram Rakha	Indian National Congress	9515
Kutlehar	None	Ranjit Singh	Janata Party	7022	Ram Nath Sharma	Indian National Congress	6244
Nurpur	None	Sat Mahajan	Indian National Congress	15384	Kewal Singh	Janata Party	12085
Gangath	SC	Des Raj	Bharatiya Janata Party	11751	Dhinoo Ram	Indian National Congress	9048
Jawali	None	Rajan Sushant	Bharatiya Janata Party	11669	Sujan Singh Pathaania	Indian National Congress	11141
Guler	None	Chander Kumar	Indian National Congress	8867	Harbans Singh Rana	Independent	5775
Jaswan	None	Agya Ram Thakur	Bharatiya Janata Party	10147	Sarla Sharma	Indian National Congress	8598
Pragpur	SC	Virender Kumar	Bharatiya Janata Party	9241	Yog Raj	Independent	7503
Jawalamukhi	None	Kashmir Singh Rana	Bharatiya Janata Party	9350	Mela Ram Saver	Indian National Congress	7472
Thural	None	Chandresh Kumari	Indian National Congress	7423	Santosh Kumar	Bharatiya Janata Party	6742
Rajgir	SC	Milkhi Ram Goma	Indian National Congress	9358	Shambhu Ram	Bharatiya Janata Party	6717
Baijnath	None	Sant Ram	Indian National Congress	10346	Milkhi Ram	Independent	4202
Palampur	None	Sarwan Kumar	Bharatiya Janata Party	10508	Kunj Bihari Lal	Indian National Congress	8762
Sulah	None	Shanta Kumar	Bharatiya Janata Party	11857	Man Chand	Indian National Congress	8708
Nagrota	None	Ram Chand	Bharatiya Janata Party	12618	Hardyal	Indian National Congress	9254
Shahpur	None	Vijai Singh	Independent	11301	Ajit Paul	Indian National Congress	6386
Dharamsala	None	Brij Lal	Bharatiya Janata Party	9513	Mool Raj Sharma	Indian National Congress	6971
Kangra	None	Vidya Sagar	Bharatiya Janata Party	15097	Surendar Paul	Indian National Congress	7388
Bhattiyat	None	Shiv Kumar	Indian National Congress	10796	Amar Singh	Bharatiya Janata Party	7480
Banikhet	None	Des Raj Mahajan	Indian National Congress	12663	Daulat Ram	Communist Party of India	6154
Rajnagar	SC	Mohan Lal	Bharatiya Janata Party	11927	Vidya Dhar	Indian National Congress	11885
Chamba	None	Sagar Chand	Indian National Congress	12744	Kishori Lal	Bharatiya Janata Party	9983
Bharmour	ST	Thakur Singh	Indian National Congress	7285	Ram Charan	Independent	5474
Lahaul And Spiti	ST	Thakur Devi Singh	Indian National Congress	5636	Surinder Chand	Bharatiya Janata Party	3446
Kullu	None	Kunj Lal	Bharatiya Janata Party	14967	Raj Krishan Gaor	Indian National Congress	13425
Banjar	None	Maheshwar Singh	Bharatiya Janata Party	19243	Dile Ram Shabab	Indian National Congress	11872
Ani	SC	Khub Ram	Bharatiya Janata Party	14599	Isher Dass	Indian National Congress	11926
Karsog	SC	Mansha Ram	Independent	8992	Sunder Singh	Bharatiya Janata Party	7422
Chachiot	None	Moti Ram	Independent	10733	Karam Singh	Indian National Congress	10252
Nachan	SC	Dile Ram	Bharatiya Janata Party	11873	Tek Chand	Indian National Congress	8745
Sundarnagar	None	Roop Singh	Bharatiya Janata Party	11560	Lachhami Dutt	Indian National Congress	6520
Balh	SC	Piru Ram	Indian National Congress	12334	Damodar Dass	Bharatiya Janata Party	11828
Gopalpur	None	Rangila Ram	Indian National Congress	17812	Lila Devi Sharma	Bharatiya Janata Party	7130
Dharampur	None	Bhikham Ram	Indian National Congress	10310	Om Chand	Bharatiya Janata Party	8782
Joginder Nagar	None	Gulab Singh	Independent	8586	Rattan Lal	Indian National Congress	7928
Darang	None	Kaul Singh	Indian National Congress	12989	Dina Nath	Bharatiya Janata Party	9189
Mandi	None	Sukh Ram	Indian National Congress	12517	Kanhaya Lal	Bharatiya Janata Party	9845

== See also ==
- List of constituencies of the Himachal Pradesh Legislative Assembly
- 1982 elections in India
