= 1977 Himachal Pradesh Legislative Assembly election =

Indian state legislative election

- 6 October 1977

68 seats in the Himachal Pradesh Legislative Assembly 35 seats needed for a majority
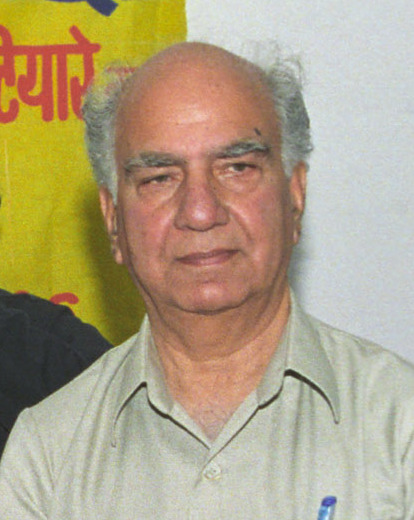

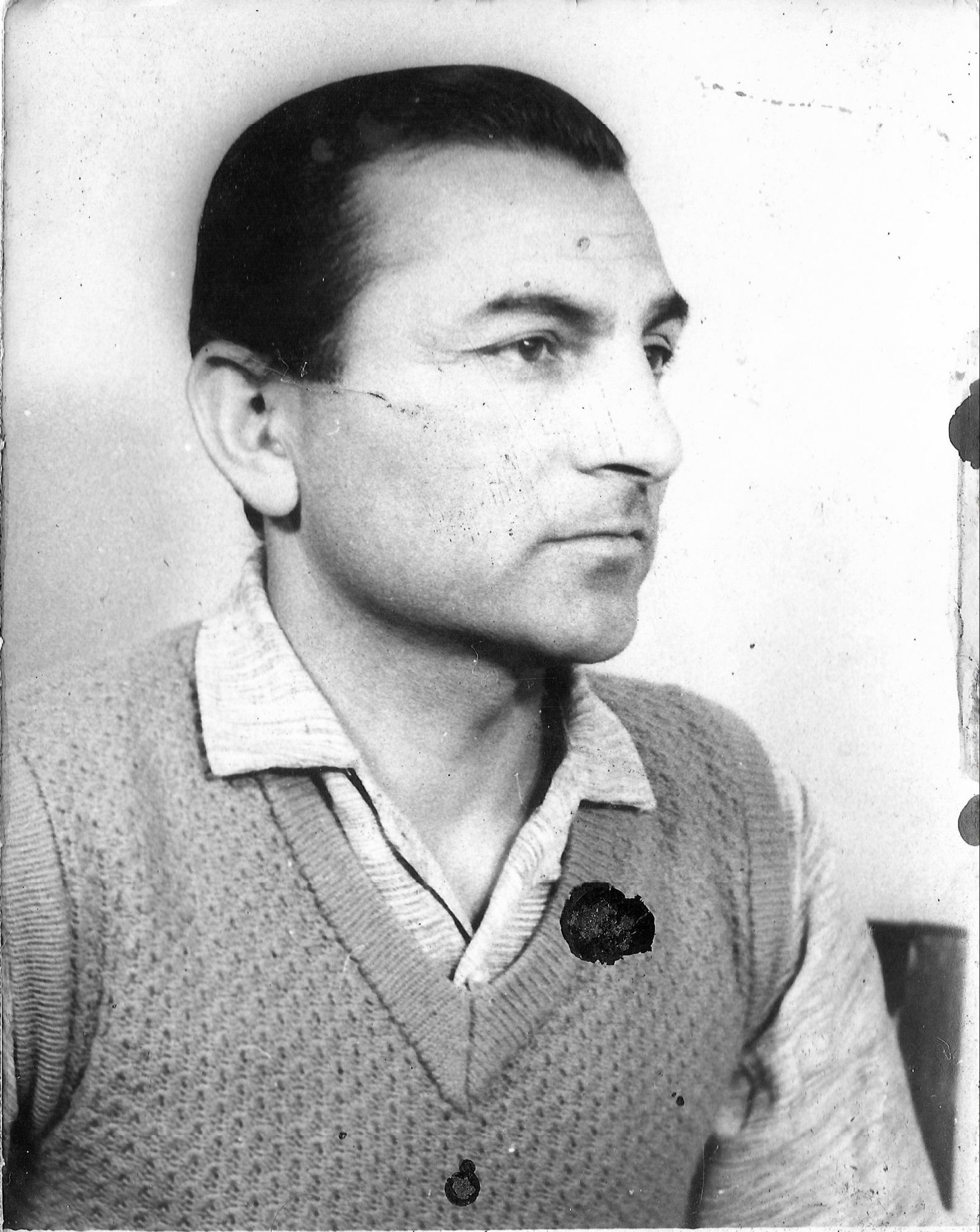
	Majority party	Minority party
Leader	Shanta Kumar	Thakur Ram Lal
Party	JP	INC(R)
Seats before	new	53
Seats won	53	9
Seat change	new	▼44
Popular vote	49.01%	27.32%
CM before election
President's rule
Elected CM
Shanta Kumar
JP

Legislative Assembly elections were held in Himachal Pradesh on 6 October 1977.

== Results ==
Rank	Party	Seats Contested	Seats won	% votes
1	Janata Party	68	53	49.01
2	Indian National Congress	56	9	27.32
3	Independent	68	6	21.10
	Total		68	

=== Constituency-wise results ===
A. C. NO.	Assembly Constituency Name	Category	Winner Candidates Name	Party	Votes	Runner-up Candidates Name	Party	Votes
1	Kinnaur	(ST)	Thakur Sen Negi	Independent	10543	Gyan Singh	Independent	2937
2	Rampur	(SC)	Ninzoo Ram	Janata Party	5572	Mangat Ram	Independent	2947
3	Rohru	GEN	Satya Dev	Janata Party	9785	Nehar Singh	Independent	7113
4	Jubbal-Kotkhai	GEN	Ram Lal	Indian National Congress	11115	Padam Singh Jhina	Janata Party	5799
5	Chopal	GEN	Radha Raman	Janata Party	6466	Sant Ram	Independent	3313
6	Kumarsain	GEN	Bhaskera Nand	Independent	7199	Jai Bihari Lal Khachi	Indian National Congress	5762
7	Theog	GEN	Mehar Singh Chauhan	Janata Party	13081	Vidya	Indian National Congress	5839
8	Simla	GEN	Daulat Ram Chauhan	Janata Party	14105	Usha Malhotra	Indian National Congress	3658
9	Kasumpti	(SC)	Roop Dass Kashyap	Independent	6526	Shonkia Ram Kashyap	Indian National Congress	4060
10	Arki	GEN	Nagin Chandra Pall	Janata Party	10976	Kameshwar	Communist Party of India	2659
11	Doon	GEN	Ram Pratap	Independent	7827	Krishna Mohini	Janata Party	5583
12	Nalagarh	GEN	Vijayendra Singh	Janata Party	14684	Arjun Singh	Independent	3756
13	Kasauli	(SC)	Chaman Lal	Janata Party	5197	Krishan Datt	Indian National Congress	4718
14	Solan	GEN	Gauri Shankar	Janata Party	7422	Ishwar Singh	Independent	2809
15	Pachhad	(SC)	Shri Ram Jakhmi	Janata Party	6512	Vidya Nand	Independent	3837
16	Rainka	(SC)	Roop Singh	Janata Party	8568	Nain Singh Tomar	Indian National Congress	4416
17	Shillai	GEN	Guman Singh Chauhan	Indian National Congress	5994	Jagat Singh	Janata Party	5899
18	Paonta Doon	GEN	Milkh Raj	Independent	7643	Rattan Singh	Indian National Congress	5081
19	Nahan	GEN	Shyama Sharma	Janata Party	11874	Sunder Singh	Indian National Congress	4481
20	Kotkehloor	GEN	Daulat Ram Sankhyan	Janata Party	12074	Kuldip Singh	Indian National Congress	4546
21	Bilaspur	GEN	Anand Chand	Independent	8821	Sant Ram Sant	Janata Party	7398
22	Ghumarwin	GEN	Narayan Singh Swami	Janata Party	11188	Sita Ram	Indian National Congress	7728
23	Geharwin	(SC)	Bachittar Singh	Janata Party	10466	Rikhi Ram	Indian National Congress	2484
24	Nadaun	GEN	Narain Chand	Indian National Congress	8361	Prem Singh	Janata Party	6197
25	Hamirpur	GEN	Jagdev Chand	Janata Party	9322	Ramesh Chand Verma	Indian National Congress	6686
26	Bamsan	GEN	Ranjit Singh Verma	Janata Party	7623	Bhumi Dev	Indian National Congress	5002
27	Mewa	(SC)	Amar Singh Choudhry	Janata Party	8533	Dharam Singh	Indian National Congress	7512
28	Nadaunta	GEN	Udho Ram	Janata Party	9380	Pramodh Singh	Indian National Congress	3810
29	Gagret	GEN	Sadhu Ram	Janata Party	7520	Milkhi Ram	Indian National Congress	6959
30	Chintpurni	GEN	Hans Raj	Janata Party	7636	Onkar Chand	Indian National Congress	6055
31	Santokgarh	GEN	Vijay Kumar Joshi	Janata Party	14058	Kashmiri Lal Joshi	Indian National Congress	7111
32	Una	GEN	Des Raj	Janata Party	8001	Surendar Nath	Independent	5314
33	Kutlehar	GEN	Ram Nath Sharma	Janata Party	9836	Sarla Devi	Indian National Congress	6000
34	Nurpur	GEN	Sant Mahajan	Indian National Congress	12617	Kewal Singh	Janata Party	11105
35	Gangath	(SC)	Durga Dass	Janata Party	9416	Shankar Singh	Communist Party of India	7261
36	Jawali	GEN	Sujan Singh Pathania	Janata Party	9965	Vikram Singh	Indian National Congress	5075
37	Guler	GEN	Harbans Singh	Janata Party	6649	Chander Kumar	Independent	5905
38	Jaswan	GEN	Agya Ram	Janata Party	8504	Paras Ram	Communist Party of India	4760
39	Pragpur	(SC)	Yog Raj	Janata Party	9881	Dalip Singh	Indian National Congress	5036
40	Jawalamukhi	GEN	Kashmir Singh Rana	Janata Party	6992	Ishwar Chand	Independent	4827
41	Thural	GEN	Gian Chand	Janata Party	8705	Tara Chand	Independent	1922
42	Rajgir	(SC)	Guler Chand	Janata Party	6571	Milkhi Ram Goma	Indian National Congress	4729
43	Baijnath	GEN	Sant Ram	Indian National Congress	9200	Om Prakash Kauda	Janata Party	7175
44	Palampur	GEN	Sarvan Kumar	Janata Party	9930	Bidhi Chand	Indian National Congress	7633
45	Sullah	GEN	Shanta Kumar	Janata Party	11832	Bidhi Chand	Communist Party of India	5685
46	Nagrota	GEN	Hardyal	Indian National Congress	11652	Saminder Prakash	Janata Party	6687
47	Shahpur	GEN	Ram Rattan	Janata Party	9812	Kultar Chand Rana	Indian National Congress	4796
48	Dharamsala	GEN	Brij Lal	Janata Party	8576	Chander Verkar	Indian National Congress	5649
49	Kangra	GEN	Pratap Chaudhary	Janata Party	8739	Surinder Paul	Indian National Congress	6839
50	Bhattiyat	GEN	Shiv Kumar	Janata Party	8881	Jagdish Chand	Independent	1710
51	Banikhet	GEN	Gian Chand	Janata Party	13235	Des Raj	Indian National Congress	5681
52	Rajnagar	(SC)	Mohan Lal	Janata Party	9848	Vidya Dhar	Indian National Congress	4367
53	Chamba	GEN	Kishori Lal	Janata Party	11239	Sagar Chand	Indian National Congress	7393
54	Bharmour	(ST)	Ram Chand	Janata Party	7223	Thakar Singh	Independent	3903
55	Lahaul and Spiti	(ST)	Thakur Devi Singh	Janata Party	5649	Shiv Chand	Independent	1548
56	Kullu	GEN	Kunj Lal	Janata Party	9688	Raj Krishan Gour	Indian National Congress	6324
57	Banjar	GEN	Maheshwar Singh	Janata Party	10478	Dile Ram Shabab	Indian National Congress	6495
58	Anni	(SC)	Ishar Dass	Indian National Congress	5573	Sharda Devi	Janata Party	4486
59	Karsog	(SC)	Joginder Pal	Janata Party	7582	Sangat Ram	Independent	3200
60	Chachiot	GEN	Moti Ram	Janata Party	10423	Karam Singh	Indian National Congress	4588
61	Nachan	(SC)	Dile Ram	Janata Party	7222	Tehal Dass	Indian National Congress	3751
62	Sundernagar	GEN	Roop Singh	Janata Party	5105	Ajit Ram	Independent	4278
63	Balh	(SC)	Tulsi Ram	Janata Party	8157	Piroo Ram	Indian National Congress	7765
64	Gopalpur	GEN	Rangila Ram	Indian National Congress	12735	Hari Singh	Independent	2925
65	Dharampur	GEN	Om Chand	Janata Party	9139	Bhikha Ram	Indian National Congress	5908
66	Joginder Nagar	GEN	Ghulab Singh	Janata Party	5705	Rattan Lal	Indian National Congress	4815
67	Darang	GEN	Kaul Singh	Janata Party	6588	Dina Nath Gautam	Independent	6057
68	Mandi	GEN	Sukh Ram	Indian National Congress	12150	Lila Devi	Janata Party	6917
