= 1972 Himachal Pradesh Legislative Assembly election =

Indian state legislative election

- 5 March 1972

All 68 seats in the Himachal Pradesh Legislative Assembly 35 seats needed for a majority
- Registered: 1,805,448
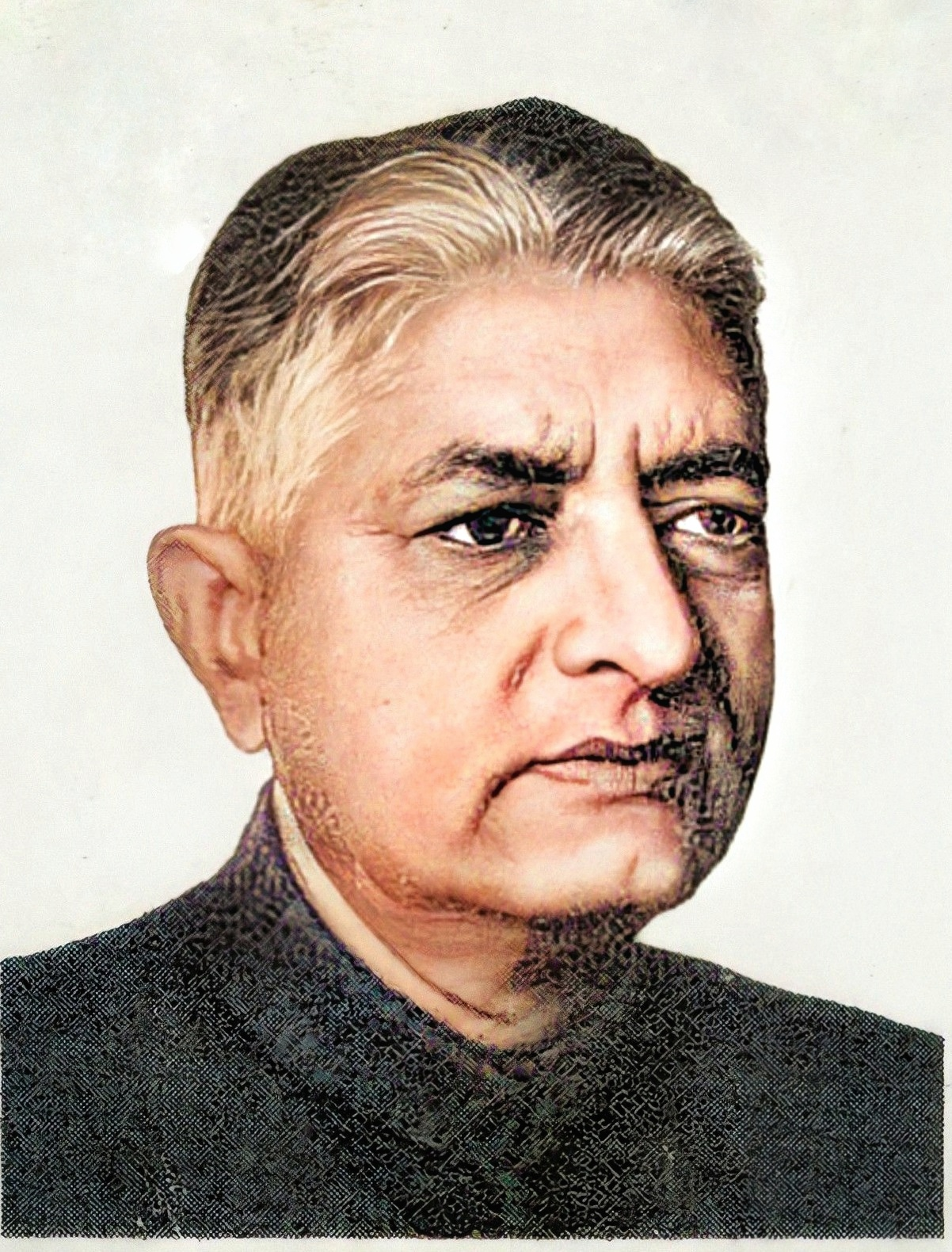

	Majority party	Minority party
Leader	Yashwant Singh Parmar
Party	INC(R)	ABJS
Leader's seat	Rainka Assembly constituency
Seats before	34	7
Seats won	53	5
Seat change	▲19	▼2
Popular vote	53.24%	7.75%
CM before election
Yashwant Singh Parmar
INC
Elected CM
Yashwant Singh Parmar
INC

Elections to the Himachal Pradesh Legislative Assembly were held in March 1972 to elect members of the 68 constituencies in Himachal Pradesh, India. The Indian National Congress won the popular vote and a majority of seats and Yashwant Singh Parmar was reappointed as the Chief Minister of Himachal Pradesh. The number of constituencies was set as 68 by the recommendation of the Delimitation Commission of India.

== Result ==
Party	Votes	%	Seats	+/–
INC	467,592	53.24	53	▲19
BJS	68,032	7.75	5	New
LRP	44,067	5.02	2	▼9
CPI(M)	9,654	1.10	1	▼3
Others	40,590	4.62	0	0
IND	248,310	28.27	7	▼9
Total	878,245	100.00	68	▲8
Valid votes	878,245	97.39		
Invalid/blank votes	23,506	2.61		
Total votes	901,751	100.00		
Registered voters/turnout	1,805,448	49.95		
Source: ECI

== Elected members ==
Constituency	Reserved for (SC/ST/None)	Member	Party
Kinnaur	ST	Thakur Sen Negi	Lok Raj Party Himachal Pradesh
Rampur	SC	Nek Ram Negi	Indian National Congress
Rohru	None	Amrit Singh Rathore	Indian National Congress
Jubbal Kotkhai	None	Thakur Ram Lal	Indian National Congress
Chopal	None	Kewal Ram Chauhan	Indian National Congress
Kumarsain	None	Jai Bihari Lal Khachi	Independent
Theog	None	Lal Chand Stokes	Indian National Congress
Kasumpti	SC	Shonkia Ram Kashyap	Indian National Congress
Arki	None	Hira Singh Pal	Lok Raj Party Himachal Pradesh
Solan	SC	Krishan Datt	Independent
Doon	None	Lekh Ram	Indian National Congress
Nalagarh	None	Arjan Singh	Indian National Congress
Simla	None	Daulat Ram Chauhan	Bharatiya Jana Sangh
Kandaghat	SC	Bhagwan Singh	Indian National Congress
Pachhad	SC	Zalam Singh	Indian National Congress
Rainka	None	Yeshwant Singh Parmar	Indian National Congress
Shillai	None	Guman Singh Chauhan	Indian National Congress
Paonta Doon	None	Hirendra Singh	Indian National Congress
Nahan	None	Sunder Singh Thakar	Indian National Congress
Kotkehloor	None	Kuldeep Singh	Indian National Congress
Bilaspur	None	Kishori Lal	Indian National Congress
Geharwin	SC	Nikku Ram	Indian National Congress
Ghumarwin	None	Sita Ram	Indian National Congress
Hamirpur	None	Ramesh Chand Verma	Indian National Congress
Bamsan	None	Chandresh Kumari Katoch	Indian National Congress
Mewa	SC	Dharam Singh	Indian National Congress
Nadaunta	None	Bishan Dutt Lakhan Pal	Indian National Congress
Nadaun	None	Babu Ram	Indian National Congress
Kutlehar	None	Sarla Sharma	Indian National Congress
Santokhgarh	None	Ram Rakha	Indian National Congress
Beet	None	Kashmiri Lal	Indian National Congress
Una	None	Parkash Chand	Indian National Congress
Gagret	SC	Mehnga Singh	Indian National Congress
Chintpurni	None	Onkar Chand	Indian National Congress
Jawalamukhi	None	Mela Ram	Independent
Garli	SC	Dalip Singh	Indian National Congress
Jaswan	None	Dr. Saligram	Indian National Congress
Mangwal	None	Churamani	Indian National Congress
Jawali	None	Vikram Singh	Indian National Congress
Gangath	SC	Dhinoo Ram	Indian National Congress
Nurpur	None	Kewal Singh	Independent
Shahpur	None	Kultar Chand Rana	Indian National Congress
Dharamsala	None	Chander Verker	Indian National Congress
Kangra	None	Hari Ram	Indian National Congress
Nagrota	None	Hardayal	Indian National Congress
Palampur	None	Kunj Behari Lal Butail	Indian National Congress
Sulah	None	Durga Chand	Bharatiya Jana Sangh
Rajgir	SC	Wazir	Indian National Congress
Khera	None	Shanta Kumar	Bharatiya Jana Sangh
Baijnath	None	Sant Ram	Indian National Congress
Bhattiyat	None	Padma	Indian National Congress
Banikhet	None	Des Raj	Indian National Congress
Rajnagar	SC	Vidhya Dhar	Indian National Congress
Chamba	None	Kishori Lal	Bharatiya Jana Sangh
Bharmour	ST	Shiri Ram	Indian National Congress
Lahaul Spiti	ST	Lata Thakur	Indian National Congress
Kulu	None	Lal Chand Prarthi	Indian National Congress
Inner Seraj	None	Dile Ram Shabab	Indian National Congress
Outer Seraj	SC	Islhar Dass	Indian National Congress
Karsog	SC	Mansa Ram	Indian National Congress
Chachiot	None	Karam Singh	Indian National Congress
Sundernagar	None	Ganga Singh	Bharatiya Jana Sangh
Balh	SC	Tulsi Ram	Communist Party of India
Gopalpur	None	Rangila Ram Rao	Independent
Dharampur	None	Bhikhamram	Independent
Chauntra	SC	Ram Singh	Independent
Joginder Nagar	None	Prakash Chandra	Indian National Congress
Mandi	None	Sukh Ram	Indian National Congress

== See also ==
- List of constituencies of the Himachal Pradesh Legislative Assembly
- 1972 elections in India
