= 1990 Himachal Pradesh Legislative Assembly election =

Indian state legislative election

- 27 February 1990

67 seats in the Himachal Pradesh Legislative Assembly 34 seats needed for a majority
- Registered: 2,993,699
- Turnout: 67.76%
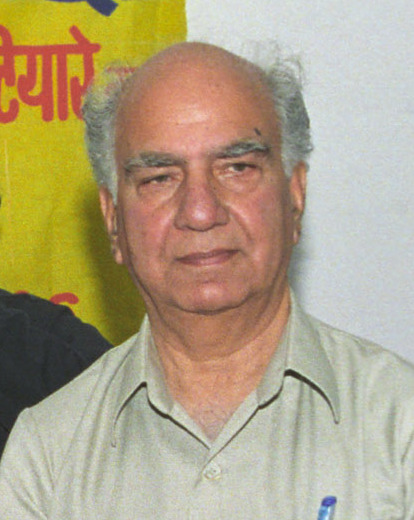

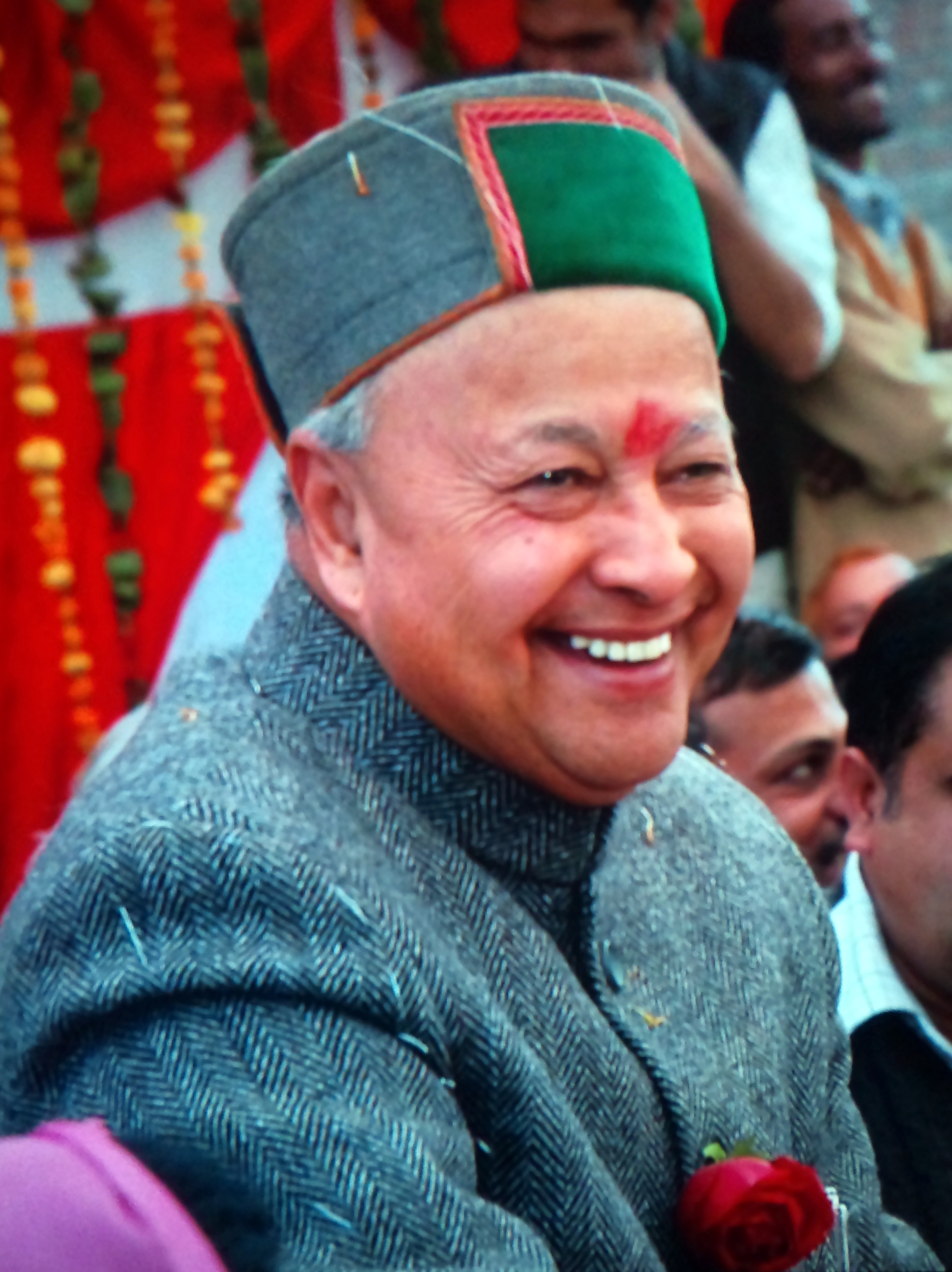
	Majority party	Minority party	Third party
Leader	Shanta Kumar		Virbhadra Singh
Party	BJP	JD	INC
Seats before	7	New	58
Seats won	46	11	9
Seat change	▲39	New	▼49
Popular vote	858,518	222,542	750,885
Percentage	41.78%	10.83%	36.54%
Swing	▲5.91%	New	▼19.32%
CM before election
Virbhadra Singh
INC
Elected CM
Shanta Kumar
BJP

Elections to the Himachal Pradesh Legislative Assembly were held in February 1990 to elect members of 67 constituencies in Himachal Pradesh, India. The Bharatiya Janata Party won the popular vote and a majority of seats and its leader, Shanta Kumar was appointed as the Chief Minister of Himachal Pradesh for his second term. The number of constituencies was set as 68 by the recommendation of the Delimitation Commission of India.

== Results ==
Party	Votes	%	Seats	+/–
Bharatiya Janata Party	858,518	41.78	46	▲39
Indian National Congress	750,885	36.54	9	▼49
Janata Dal	222,542	10.83	11	New
Communist Party of India	42,393	2.06	1	▲1
Others	55,139	2.68	0	0
Independents	125,421	6.10	1	▼1
Total	2,054,898	100.00	68	0
Valid votes	2,054,898	99.20		
Invalid/blank votes	16,625	0.80		
Total votes	2,071,523	100.00		
Registered voters/turnout	2,993,699	69.20		
Source: ECI

== Elected members ==
Constituency	Reserved for (SC/ST/None)	Member	Party	Vote	Runner-up Candidates Name	Party	vote
Kinnaur	ST	Thakur Sen Negi	Bharatiya Janata Party	17653	Gopi Chand Negi	Independent	11187
Rampur	SC	Singhi Ram	Indian National Congress	18777	Ninzoo Ram	Independent	6921
Rohru	None	Virbhadra Singh	Indian National Congress	27602	Satya Dev Bushehari	Janata Dal	2976
Jubbal-kotkhai	None	Ram Lal	Janata Dal	16209	Virbhadra Singh	Indian National Congress	14723
Chopal	None	Radha Raman Shastri	Bharatiya Janata Party	17124	Yogendra Chandra	Indian National Congress	7027
Kumarsain	None	Bhagat Ram Chauhan	Bharatiya Janata Party	16078	Jai Bihari Lal Khachi	Indian National Congress	13892
Theog	None	Vidya Stokes	Indian National Congress	15586	Keshav Ram Kashyap	Janata Dal	14782
Simla	None	Suresh Bharadwaj	Bharatiya Janata Party	12701	Rakesh Singha	Communist Party of India	6857
Kasumpti	SC	Roop Dass Kashyap	Bharatiya Janata Party	20770	Shonkia Ram Kashyap	Indian National Congress	7493
Arki	None	Nagin Chander Pal	Bharatiya Janata Party	15350	Amar Chand Pal	Indian National Congress	4352
Doon	None	Chaudhary Lajja Ram	Janata Dal	13974	Lekh Ram	Indian National Congress	6485
Nalagarh	None	Vijayandra Singh	Indian National Congress	19774	Kehar Singh	Janata Dal	13428
Kasauli	SC	Satya Pal Kamboj	Bharatiya Janata Party	11333	Raghu Raj	Indian National Congress	7301
Solan	None	Mahender Nath Sofat	Bharatiya Janata Party	11882	Gian Chand	Indian National Congress	9147
Pachhad	SC	Ganguram Musafir	Indian National Congress	17006	Kali Dass	Bharatiya Janata Party	11835
Rainka	SC	Roop Singh	Janata Dal	13836	Prem Singh	Indian National Congress	11147
Shillai	None	Jagat Singh Negi	Janata Dal	13375	Harshvardhan Singh Chauhan	Indian National Congress	9907
Paonta Doon	None	Fateh Singh	Bharatiya Janata Party	19750	Kush Parmar	Indian National Congress	13854
Nahan	None	Shyama Sharma	Janata Dal	15810	Ajay Bahadur Singh	Indian National Congress	8516
Kotkehloor	None	Krishan Kumar Kaushal	Communist Party of India	18437	Ramlal Thakur	Indian National Congress	12846
Bilaspur	None	Sadaram Thakur	Bharatiya Janata Party	18309	Shiv Ram	Indian National Congress	10547
Ghumarwin	None	Karamdev Dharmani	Bharatiya Janata Party	16336	Kashmir Singh	Indian National Congress	10843
Geharwin	SC	Rikhi Ram Kondal	Bharatiya Janata Party	15784	Beeru Ram Kisore	Indian National Congress	12833
Nadaun	None	Narain Chand Prashar	Indian National Congress	12198	Babu Ram Mandial	Janata Dal	9860
Hamirpur	None	Jagdev Chand	Bharatiya Janata Party	18554	Anita Verma	Independent	9667
Bamsan	None	Lashkari Ram	Bharatiya Janata Party	16450	Karam Singh	Indian National Congress	7131
Mewa	SC	Ishwar Dass	Bharatiya Janata Party	20832	Dharam Singh	Indian National Congress	8908
Nadaunta	None	Ram Rattan Sharma	Bharatiya Janata Party	19626	Manjit Singh	Indian National Congress	11536
Gagret	SC	Sadhu Ram	Bharatiya Janata Party	17815	Kuldip Kumar	Indian National Congress	10351
Chintpurni	None	Sushma Sharma	Bharatiya Janata Party	13619	Hari Dutt Sharma	Indian National Congress	10718
Santokgarh	None	Kashmiri Lal Joshi	Bharatiya Janata Party	21240	Vijay Kumar Joshi	Indian National Congress	12451
Una	None	Desraj	Bharatiya Janata Party	22585	Virender Gautam	Indian National Congress	14759
Kutlehar	None	Ranjit Singh	Janata Dal	15994	Ram Nath Sharma	Indian National Congress	11988
Nurpur	None	Kewal Singh	Janata Dal	21879	Sat Mahajan	Indian National Congress	18436
Gangath	SC	Des Raj	Bharatiya Janata Party	20944	Girdhari Lal	Indian National Congress	7345
Jawali	None	Sujan Singh Pathania	Indian National Congress	19508	Rajan Sushant	Bharatiya Janata Party	17787
Guler	None	Harbans Singh Rana	Bharatiya Janata Party	15140	Chander Kumar	Indian National Congress	12099
Jaswan	None	Kashmir Singh Rana	Bharatiya Janata Party	14155	Viplove Thakur	Indian National Congress	11036
Pragpur	SC	Virender Kumar	Bharatiya Janata Party	20197	Yog Raj	Indian National Congress	11359
Jawalamukhi	None	Dhani Ram	Bharatiya Janata Party	19152	Sushil Chand Rattan	Indian National Congress	7037
Thural	None	Kanwar Durga Chand	Janata Dal	12626	Aditya Dev Chand	Indian National Congress	5730
Rajgir	SC	Atma Ram	Bharatiya Janata Party	13517	Milkh Ram Goma	Indian National Congress	7861
Baijnath	None	Dulo Ram	Bharatiya Janata Party	16371	Sant Ram	Indian National Congress	12576
Palampur	None	Shanta Kumar	Bharatiya Janata Party	18012	Brij Bihari Lal	Indian National Congress	12050
Sulah	None	Shanta Kumar	Bharatiya Janata Party	14930	Man Chand Rana	Indian National Congress	10664
Nagrota	None	Ram Chand Bhatia	Bharatiya Janata Party	17346	Hardyal	Indian National Congress	12489
Shahpur	None	Vijai Singh Mankotia	Janata Dal	17130	Ajit Pal	Indian National Congress	12677
Dharamsala	None	Kishan Chand	Bharatiya Janata Party	18666	Mool Raj Padha	Indian National Congress	5003
Kangra	None	Vidya Sagar	Bharatiya Janata Party	24729	Hari Krishan Chand	Indian National Congress	7899
Bhattiyat	None	Shiv Kumar	Janata Dal	15620	Kuldip Singh	Indian National Congress	8589
Banikhet	None	Gandharv Singh	Bharatiya Janata Party	11962	Asha Kumari	Indian National Congress	10464
Rajnagar	SC	Mohan Lal	Bharatiya Janata Party	17127	Nand Kumar	Indian National Congress	9549
Chamba	None	Kishori Lal	Bharatiya Janata Party	17938	Sagar Chand	Indian National Congress	12189
Bharmour	ST	Tulsi Ram	Bharatiya Janata Party	15727	Thakur Singh	Indian National Congress	8106
Lahaul And Spiti	ST	Phunchog Rai	Indian National Congress	6533	Hishe Dogia	Bharatiya Janata Party	5082
Banjar	None	Karan Singh	Bharatiya Janata Party	22084	Satya Prakash Thakur	Indian National Congress	16948
Ani	SC	Khub Ram	Bharatiya Janata Party	22407	Diwan Singh	Indian National Congress	9569
Karsog	SC	Joginder Pal	Bharatiya Janata Party	15855	Mansa Ram	Indian National Congress	3995
Chachiot	None	Moti Ram	Janata Dal	12654	Vir Singh	Independent	7072
Nachan	SC	Dile Ram	Bharatiya Janata Party	16334	Tek Chand	Indian National Congress	11858
Sundernagar	None	Roop Singh	Bharatiya Janata Party	15778	Sher Singh	Indian National Congress	8641
Balh	SC	Damodar Dass	Bharatiya Janata Party	24088	Piru Ram	Indian National Congress	10900
Gopalpur	None	Leela	Bharatiya Janata Party	17021	Rangila Ram	Indian National Congress	16581
Dharampur	None	Mahender Singh	Independent	11970	Priya Brat	Bharatiya Janata Party	8248
Joginder Nagar	None	Gulab Singh	Indian National Congress	15924	Rattan Lal	Janata Dal	11571
Darang	None	Dina Nath	Bharatiya Janata Party	18980	Kaul Singh	Indian National Congress	15699
Mandi	None	Kanhaiya Lal	Bharatiya Janata Party	19732	Durga Dutt Thakur	Indian National Congress	10842

== See also ==
- 1990 elections in India
