= Bharatiya Janata Party – Himachal Pradesh =

Political party in northern India

- Abbreviation: BJP
- Leader: Jai Ram Thakur (Leader of the Opposition)
- President: Rajeev Bindal
- General Secretary: Pavan Rana
- Founder: Atal Bihari Vajpayee; Lal Krishna Advani; Murli Manohar Joshi; Nanaji Deshmukh; K. R. Malkani; Sikandar Bakht; Vijay Kumar Malhotra; Vijaya Raje Scindia; Bhairon Singh Shekhawat; Shanta Kumar; Ram Jethmalani; Jagannathrao Joshi
- Founded: 6 April 1980 (46 years ago)
- Headquarters: Deep Kamal, Kamna Nagar, Shimla-5 Himachal Pradesh
- ECI Status: National Party
- Seats in Rajya Sabha: 2 / 3
- Seats in Lok Sabha: 4 / 4
- Seats in Himachal Pradesh Legislative Assembly: 28 / 68

Election symbol
- Lotus

Party flag

Website
- hp.bjp.org

Bharatiya Janata Party – Himachal Pradesh, or simply, BJP Himachal Pradesh is the affiliate of Bharatiya Janata Party for the state of Himachal Pradesh. Its head office is situated at the Deep Kamal Chakkar, Shimla.

== Electoral history ==
=== Legislative Assembly election ===
Year	Party leader	Seats won	+/-	Voteshare (%)	+/- (%)	Outcome
Bharatiya Jana Sangh
1967	Shanta Kumar	7 / 60	▲7	13.87%	▲13.87	Opposition
1972	Shanta Kumar	5 / 68	▼2	7.75%	▼6.12%	Opposition
Bharatiya Janata Party
1982	Shanta Kumar	29 / 68	▲29	35.16%	▲35.16%	Opposition
1985	Shanta Kumar	7 / 68	▼22	30.61%	▼4.55%	Opposition
1990	Shanta Kumar	46 / 68	▲39	41.78%	▲11.17	Government
1993	Shanta Kumar	8 / 68	▼38	36.14%	▼5.64%	Opposition
1998	Prem Kumar Dhumal	31 / 68	▲23	39.02%	▲2.88%	Government
2003	Prem Kumar Dhumal	16 / 68	▼15	35.38%	▼3.64%	Opposition
2007	Prem Kumar Dhumal	41 / 68	▲25	43.78%	▲8.4%	Government
2012	Prem Kumar Dhumal	26 / 68	▼15	38.47%	▼5.31%	Opposition
2017	Jai Ram Thakur	44 / 68	▲18	48.79%	▲10.32%	Government
2022	Jai Ram Thakur	25 / 68	▼19	43%	▼5.79%	Opposition

=== Lok Sabha seats ===
Year	Legislature	Party leader	Seats won	Change in seats	Outcome
1984	8th Lok Sabha	Atal Bihari Vajpayee	0 / 4	Steady	Opposition
1989	9th Lok Sabha	Lal Krishna Advani	3 / 4	▲3	Outside support for NF
1991	10th Lok Sabha	Lal Krishna Advani	2 / 4	▼2	Opposition
1996	11th Lok Sabha	Atal Bihari Vajpayee	0 / 4	▼2	Government, later opposition
1998	12th Lok Sabha	Atal Bihari Vajpayee	3 / 4	▲3	Government
1999	13th Lok Sabha	Atal Bihari Vajpayee	3 / 4	Steady	Government
2004	14th Lok Sabha	Atal Bihari Vajpayee	1 / 4	▼2	Opposition
2009	15th Lok Sabha	Lal Krishna Advani	3 / 4	▲2	Opposition
2014	16th Lok Sabha	Narendra Modi	4 / 4	▲1	Government
2019	17th Lok Sabha	Narendra Modi	4 / 4	Steady	Government
2024	18th Lok Sabha	Narendra Modi	4 / 4	Steady	Government

== List of Current Members ==
=== In Himachal Legislative Assembly ===
District	No.	Constituency	Name	Party	Remarks
Chamba	1	Churah (SC)	Hans Raj	Bharatiya Janata Party	
Chamba	2	Bharmour (ST)	Janak Raj	Bharatiya Janata Party	
Chamba	4	Dalhousie	D S Thakur	Bharatiya Janata Party	
Kangra	6	Nurpur	Ranveer Singh	Bharatiya Janata Party	
Kangra	11	Jaswan-Pragpur	Bikram Thakur	Bharatiya Janata Party	
Kangra	14	Sullah	Vipin Singh Parmar	Bharatiya Janata Party	
Kangra	16	Kangra	Pawan Kumar Kajal	Bharatiya Janata Party	
Kangra	18	Dharamshala	Sudhir Sharma	Bharatiya Janata Party	Elected in 2024 by-election
Kullu	24	Banjar	Surender Shourie	Bharatiya Janata Party	
Kullu	25	Anni (SC)	Lokendra Kumar	Bharatiya Janata Party	
Mandi	26	Karsog (SC)	Deepraj Kapoor	Bharatiya Janata Party	
Mandi	27	Sundernagar	Rakesh Jamwal	Bharatiya Janata Party	
Mandi	28	Nachan (SC)	Vinod Kumar	Bharatiya Janata Party	
Mandi	29	Seraj	Jai Ram Thakur	Bharatiya Janata Party	Leader of Opposition
Mandi	30	Darang	Puranchand Thakur	Bharatiya Janata Party	
Mandi	31	Jogindernagar	Prakash Rana	Bharatiya Janata Party	
Mandi	33	Mandi	Anil Sharma	Bharatiya Janata Party	
Mandi	34	Balh (SC)	Indra Singh Gandhi	Bharatiya Janata Party	
Mandi	35	Sarkaghat	Daleep Thakur	Bharatiya Janata Party	
Hamirpur	38	Hamirpur	Ashish Sharma	Bharatiya Janata Party	Elected in 2024 by-election
Hamirpur	39	Barsar	Inder Dutt Lakhanpal	Bharatiya Janata Party	Elected in 2024 by-election
Una	44	Una	Satpal Singh Satti	Bharatiya Janata Party	
Bilaspur	46	Jhanduta (SC)	Jeet Ram Katwal	Bharatiya Janata Party	
Bilaspur	48	Bilaspur	Trilok Jamwal	Bharatiya Janata Party	
Bilaspur	49	Sri Naina Deviji	Randhir Sharma	Bharatiya Janata Party	
Sirmaur	55	Pachhad (SC)	Reena Kashyap	Bharatiya Janata Party	
Sirmaur	58	Paonta Sahib	Sukh Ram Chaudhary	Bharatiya Janata Party	
Shimla	60	Chopal	Balbir Singh Verma	Bharatiya Janata Party	

=== In Rajya Sabha ===
No	Name	Party	Date of Appointment	Date of Retirement
1	Harsh Mahajan	BJP	3 April 2024	2 April 2030
2	Indu Goswami	BJP	10 April 2020	9 April 2026
3	Sikander Kumar	BJP	3 April 2022	2 April 2028

=== In Lok Sabha ===
No	Constituency	Name	Party
1	Kangra	Rajeev Bhardwaj	Bharatiya Janata Party
2	Mandi	Kangana Ranaut	Bharatiya Janata Party
3	Hamirpur	Anurag Thakur	Bharatiya Janata Party
4	Shimla (SC)	Suresh Kumar Kashyap	Bharatiya Janata Party

== Leadership ==
=== Chief Minister ===
No	Portrait	Name	Constituency	Term of Office		Tenure	Assembly
1		Shanta Kumar	Palampur	5 March 1990	15 December 1992	2 years, 285 days	7th
2		Prem Kumar Dhumal	Bamsan	24 March 1998	5 March 2003	9 years, 342 days	9th
2		Prem Kumar Dhumal	Bamsan	30 December 2007	25 December 2012	9 years, 342 days	11th
3		Jai Ram Thakur	Seraj	27 December 2017	11 December 2022	4 years, 349 days	13th

=== President ===
No	Portrait	Name	Tenure		
1		Gangaram Thakur	1980	1984	4 years
2		Nageen Chand Pal	1984	1986	2 years
3		Shanta Kumar	1986	1990	4 years
4		Maheshwar Singh	1990	1993	3 years
5		Prem Kumar Dhumal	1993	1998	5 years
6		Suresh Chandel	1998	2000	2 years
7		Jai Krishan Sharma	2000	2003	3 years
8		Suresh Bhardwaj	2003	2007	4 years
9		Jai Ram Thakur	2007	2009	2 years
10		Khimi Ram	2009	2010	1 year
11		Satpal Singh Satti	2010	2020	10 years
12		Rajeev Bindal	18 January 2020	22 July 2020	186 days
13		Suresh Kumar Kashyap	22 July 2020	23 April 2023	2 years, 275 days
(12)		Rajeev Bindal	23 April 2023	Present	3 years, 14 days

== See also ==
- Bharatiya Janata Party – Gujarat
- Bharatiya Janata Party – Uttar Pradesh
- Bharatiya Janata Party – Madhya Pradesh
- State units of the Bharatiya Janata Party
