= 2017 Himachal Pradesh Legislative Assembly election =

Indian state legislative election

- 9 November 2017

All 68 seats in the Himachal Pradesh Legislative Assembly 35 seats needed for a majority
- Turnout: 75.57% (▲2.06%)
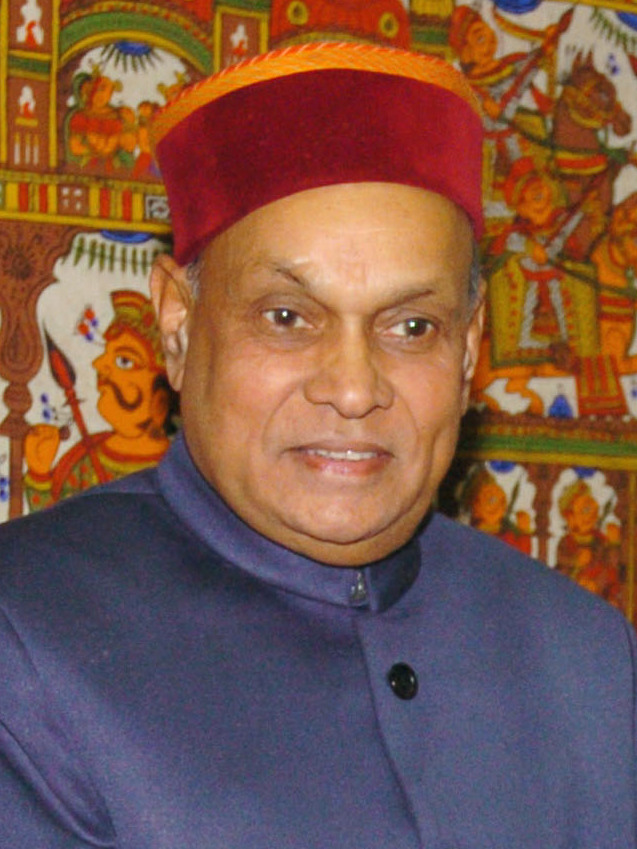

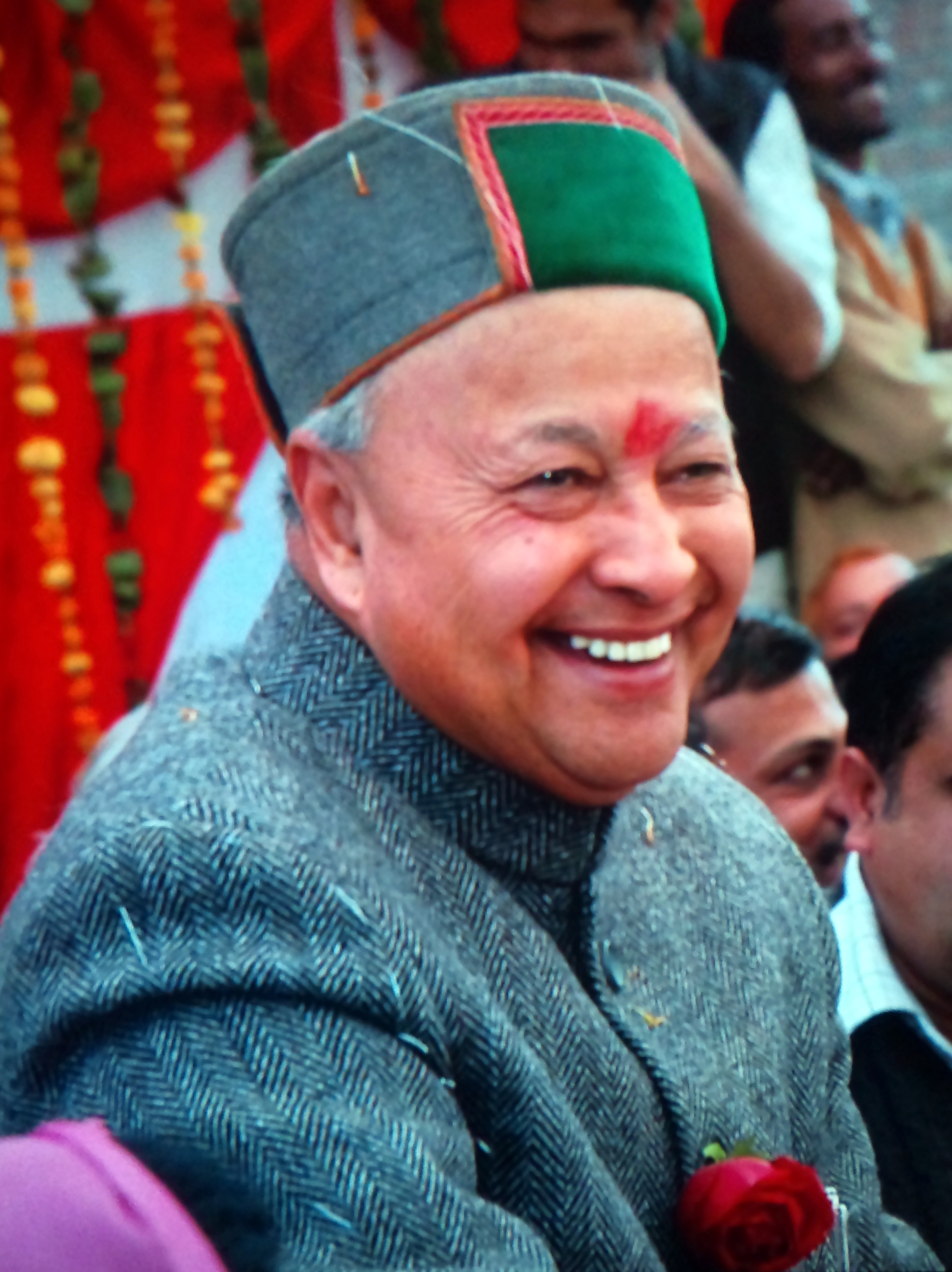

	Majority party	Minority party	Third party
Leader	Prem Kumar Dhumal	Virbhadra Singh	Rakesh Singha
Party	BJP	INC	CPI(M)
Leader since	1998	1983	2017
Leader's seat	Sujanpur(lost)	Arki	Theog
Last election	26	36	0
Seats won	44	21	1
Seat change	▲18	▼15	▲1
Popular vote	1,846,432	1,577,450	55,558
Percentage	48.8%	41.7%	1.5%
Swing	▲10.33%	▼1.11%	▼0.1%
- Seatwise Result Map of the election

- Structure of the Himachal Pradesh Legislative Assembly after the election
Chief Minister before election
Virbhadra Singh
INC
Elected Chief Minister
Jai Ram Thakur
BJP

The Himachal Pradesh Legislative Assembly election, 2017 was held on 9 November 2017 to elect all 68 members of the Himachal Pradesh Legislative Assembly.

The term of the previous Legislative Assembly ended on 7 January 2017. Since 2012, the Indian National Congress Party was in power in the outgoing assembly with 36 seats. The lone opposition party was Bharatiya Janata Party.

The Constitution of India states that the term of Legislative Assemblies is five years, at maximum. The term of current Legislative Assembly ends on 7 January 2018. The previous election, held in 2012 resulted in Congress gaining majority of seats and Virbhadra Singh becoming Chief Minister.

Himachal Pradesh, as a state of India follows Parliamentary system of government similar to other states. The Government is responsible to the Assembly and stays in power only if it has the support of majority members. Elections take place on a first past the post basis, the candidate with the most votes wins the seat regardless of an absolute majority. Every citizen of the state, who is 18 and above is eligible to vote. The Governor then invites the leader of the largest party or coalition to form the government. As is common in most other first past the post electoral systems, the state's politics are dominated by two parties – the Indian National Congress and Bharatiya Janata Party.

State elections in India are often fought on central issues, and the results are regarded as a referendum on the central government's policies. This is especially true in the case of states where the two national parties – Congress and BJP are in direct contest with each other. The state units of the parties are not completely independent and the central authority of the parties has a considerable influence over candidate selection and campaigning. However, state issues do tend to dominate the discourse. The Congress party has projected its current Chief Minister Virbhadra Singh as its Chief Ministerial candidate for the elections. BJP announced Prem Kumar Dhumal as its Chief Ministerial candidate. Dhumal, however, lost the election so eventually the BJP made Jai Ram Thakur the Chief Minister of state, who won from the Seraj constituency over health union/central minister JP Nadda. In the 17th Assembly segment, Tashigang village becomes the highest polling station at an altitude of 15256 feet. The polling station falls in Buddhist-dominated Lahul-Spiti that form the Mandi Lok Sabha seat, the second-largest constituency in India. Situated at about 29 Kilometres from the India-China border, the polling station covers two villages - Tashigang and Gets. As per the revised electoral roll, the two villages have 48 Voters of which 30 are men and 18 women.

== Preparations for elections ==
VVPAT-fitted electronic voting machines were used in all of the 7,521 polling stations, the first time that the entire state will see the implementation of VVPAT to ensure greater transparency to the voter. Over 5 million voters are registered in the state. VVPAT slips were counted in 2 polling stations each across all 68 Himachal Pradesh constituencies.

India's first voter, Shyam Saran Negi, voted for the 29th time at Kalpa polling station in Kinnaur.

Group of voters	Voters population
Male	2,531,321
Female	2,457,032
Third gender	169
Total voters	5,025,541

== Tibetan voters ==
Indian electoral rules allow any citizen of India above 18 years of age to vote in any states and union territories of India, provided he/she is a resident of that state. India has a large Tibetan diaspora that fled from Tibet along with the Dalai Lama. Dharamshala, a city in Himachal Pradesh, is the capital of the Central Tibetan Administration. The Government has allowed Tibetans born in India between 1950 and 1987 to vote in the elections. This however, does not affect their relationship with the CTA.

== Candidate list ==
BJP declared list of 68 candidates on 18 October 2017 which includes 14 first timers with 21 new faces.

== Schedule ==
Event	Date	Day
Date for nominations	16 October 2017	Monday
Last date for filing nominations	23 October 2017	Monday
Date for scrutiny of nominations	24 October 2017	Tuesday
Last date for withdrawal of candidatures	26 October 2017	Thursday
Date of poll	9 Nov 2017	Thursday
Date of counting	18 December 2017	Monday
Date before which the election shall be completed	20 December 2017	Wednesday

== Opinion polls ==
Polling firm/Commissioner	Date published			
Polling firm/Commissioner	Date published	BJP	INC	Others
India-Today (Axis) Opinion Poll	24 October 2017	49% 43–47	38% 21–25	13% 0–2
ABP News CSDS	30 October 2017	47% 39–45	41% 22–28	12% 0–3
C-Voter	7 November 2017	50% 52	37% 15	11% 1

== Results ==
The results were declared on 18 December 2017.

← Summary of the 9 November 2017 Himachal Pradesh Legislative Assembly election results
Parties and coalitions	Popular vote			Seats	
Parties and coalitions	Votes	%	±pp	Won	+/−
Bharatiya Janata Party (BJP)	1,846,432	48.8	▲10.3	44	▲18
Indian National Congress (INC)	1,577,450	41.7	▼1.1	21	▼15
Independents	239,989	6.3	▼6.1	2	▼3
Communist Party of India (Marxist) (CPI(M))	55,558	1.5	▼0.1	1	▲1
Bahujan Samaj Party (BSP)	18,540	0.5	▼0.7	0	Steady
Himachal Lokhit Party (HLP)	—N/a		▼2.4	0	▼1
None of the Above (NOTA)	34,232	0.9	▲0.9	—N/a	
Total	3,784,658	100.00		68	±0
Valid votes	3,784,658	99.64			
Invalid votes	13,158	0.36			
Votes cast / turnout	3,798,176	75.57			
Abstentions	1,227,764	24.43			
Registered voters	5,025,940				

=== District wise results ===
District wise map	District	Seats			
District wise map	District	Seats	BJP	INC	OTH
	Chamba	5	4	1	0
	Kangra	15	11	3	1
	Lahaul and Spiti	1	1	0	0
	Kullu	4	3	1	0
	Mandi	10	9	0	1
	Hamirpur	5	2	3	0
	Una	5	3	2	0
	Bilaspur	4	3	1	0
	Solan	5	2	3	0
	Sirmaur	5	3	2	0
	Shimla	8	3	4	1
	Kinnaur	1	0	1	0
	Total	68	44	21	3

=== Results by Constituency ===
District	#	Constituency	Winner			Runner-up			Margin
District	#	Constituency	Candidate	Party	Votes	Candidate	Party	Votes	Margin
Chamba	1	Churah (SC)	Hans Raj	BJP	28,293	Surender Bhardwaj	INC	23,349	4,944
Chamba	2	Bharmour (ST)	Jia Lal	BJP	25,744	Thakur Singh Bharmouri	INC	18,395	7,349
Chamba	3	Chamba	Pawan Nayyar	BJP	26,763	Neeraj Nayar	INC	24,884	1,879
Chamba	4	Dalhousie	Asha Kumari	INC	24,224	D. S. Thakur	BJP	23,668	556
Chamba	5	Bhattiyat	Bikram Singh Jaryal	BJP	29,119	Kuldeep Singh Pathania	INC	22,234	6,885
Kangra	6	Nurpur	Rakesh Pathania	BJP	34,871	Ajay Mahajan	INC	28,229	6,642
Kangra	7	Indora (SC)	Reeta Devi	BJP	29,213	Kamal Kishore	INC	28,118	1,095
Kangra	8	Fatehpur	Sujan Singh Pathania	INC	18,962	Kripal Singh Parmar	BJP	17,678	1,284
Kangra	9	Jawali	Arjun Singh	BJP	36,999	Chander Kumar	INC	28,786	8,213
Kangra	10	Dehra	Hoshyar Singh	Ind	24,206	Ravinder Singh Ravi	BJP	20,292	3,914
Kangra	11	Jaswan-Pragpur	Bikram Singh	BJP	23,583	Surinder Singh Mankotia	INC	21,721	1,862
Kangra	12	Jawalamukhi	Ramesh Chand Dhawala	BJP	27,914	Sanjay Rattan	INC	21,450	6,464
Kangra	13	Jaisinghpur (SC)	Ravinder Kumar	BJP	29,357	Yadvinder Goma	INC	18,647	10,710
Kangra	14	Sullah	Vipin Singh Parmar	BJP	38,173	Jagjiwan Paul	INC	27,882	10,291
Kangra	15	Nagrota	Arun Kumar	BJP	32,039	G S Bali	INC	31,039	1,000
Kangra	16	Kangra	Pawan Kumar Kajal	INC	25,549	Sanjay Chaudhary	BJP	19,341	6,208
Kangra	17	Shahpur	Sarveen Choudhary	BJP	23,104	Major (Ret.) Vijai Singh Mankotia	Ind	16,957	6,147
Kangra	18	Dharamshala	Kishan Kapoor	BJP	26,050	Sudhir Sharma	INC	23,053	2,997
Kangra	19	Palampur	Ashish Butail	INC	24,252	Indu Goswami	BJP	19,928	4,324
Kangra	20	Baijnath (SC)	Mulkh Raj Premi	BJP	32,102	Kishori Lal	INC	19,433	12,669
Lahaul and Spiti	21	Lahaul and Spiti (ST)	Ram Lal Markanda	BJP	7,756	Ravi Thakur	INC	6,278	1,478
Kullu	22	Manali	Govind Singh Thakur	BJP	27,173	Hari Chand Sharma	INC	24,168	3,005
Kullu	23	Kullu	Sunder Singh Thakur	INC	31,423	Maheshwar Singh	BJP	29,885	1,538
Kullu	24	Banjar	Surender Shourie	BJP	28,007	Aditya Vikram Singh	INC	24,767	3,240
Kullu	25	Anni (SC)	Kishori Lal	BJP	30,559	Paras Ram	INC	24,576	5,983
Mandi	26	Karsog (SC)	Hira Lal	BJP	22,102	Mansa Ram	INC	17,272	4,830
Mandi	27	Sundernagar	Rakesh Kumar Jamwal	BJP	32,545	Sohan Lal	INC	23,282	9,263
Mandi	28	Nachan (SC)	Vinod Kumar	BJP	38,154	Lal Singh Kaushal	INC	22,258	15,896
Mandi	29	Seraj	Jai Ram Thakur	BJP	35,519	Chet Ram	INC	24,265	11,254
Mandi	30	Darang	Jawahar Thakur	BJP	31,392	Kaul Singh	INC	24,851	6,541
Mandi	31	Jogindernagar	Prakash Rana	Ind	31,214	Gulab Singh Thakur	BJP	24,579	6,635
Mandi	32	Dharampur	Mahender Singh	BJP	27,931	Chandershekhar	INC	15,967	11,964
Mandi	33	Mandi	Anil Sharma	BJP	31,282	Champa Thakur	INC	21,025	10,257
Mandi	34	Balh (SC)	Colonel Inder Singh Gandhi	BJP	34,704	Prakash Chaudhary	INC	21,893	12,811
Mandi	35	Sarkaghat	Colonel Inder Singh	BJP	30,705	Pawan Kumar	INC	21,403	9,302
Hamirpur	36	Bhoranj (SC)	Kamlesh Kumari	BJP	27,961	Suresh Kumar	INC	21,069	6,892
Hamirpur	37	Sujanpur	Rajinder Rana	INC	25,288	Prem Kumar Dhumal	BJP	23,369	1,919
Hamirpur	38	Hamirpur	Narinder Thakur	BJP	25,854	Kuldeep Singh Pathania	INC	18,623	7,231
Hamirpur	39	Barsar	Inder Dutt Lakhanpal	INC	25,679	Baldev Sharma	BJP	25,240	439
Hamirpur	40	Nadaun	Sukhvinder Singh Sukhu	INC	30,980	Vijay Agnihotri	BJP	28,631	2,349
Una	41	Chintpurni (SC)	Balvir Singh	BJP	32,488	Kuldip Kumar	INC	23,909	8,579
Una	42	Gagret	Rajesh Thakur	BJP	33,977	Rakesh Kalia	INC	24,657	9,320
Una	43	Haroli	Mukesh Agnihotri	INC	35,095	Ram Kumar	BJP	27,718	7,377
Una	44	Una	Satpal Raizada	INC	31,360	Satpal Singh Satti	BJP	28,164	3,196
Una	45	Kutlehar	Virender Kanwar	BJP	31,101	Vivek Sharma	INC	25,495	5,606
Bilaspur	46	Jhanduta (SC)	Jeet Ram Katwal	BJP	29,030	Beeru Ram Kishore	INC	24,068	4,962
Bilaspur	47	Ghumarwin	Rajinder Garg	BJP	34,846	Rajesh Dharmani	INC	24,411	10,435
Bilaspur	48	Bilaspur	Subhash Thakur	BJP	31,547	Bumber Thakur	INC	24,685	6,862
Bilaspur	49	Sri Naina Deviji	Ram Lal Thakur	INC	28,119	Randhir Sharma	BJP	27,077	1,042
Solan	50	Arki	Virbhadra Singh	INC	34,499	Rattan Singh Pal	BJP	28,448	6,051
Solan	51	Nalagarh	Lakhvinder Singh Rana	INC	25,872	Krishan Lal Thakur	BJP	24,630	1,242
Solan	52	Doon	Paramjeet Singh Pammi	BJP	29,701	Ram Kumar	INC	25,382	4,319
Solan	53	Solan (SC)	Dhani Ram Shandil	INC	26,200	Rajesh Kashyap	BJP	25,529	671
Solan	54	Kasauli (SC)	Rajiv Saizal	BJP	23,656	Vinod Sultanpuri	INC	23,214	442
Sirmaur	55	Pachhad (SC)	Suresh Kumar Kashyap	BJP	30,243	Gangu Ram Musafir	INC	23,816	6,427
Sirmaur	56	Nahan	Dr. Rajeev Bindal	BJP	31,563	Ajay Solankey	INC	27,573	3,990
Sirmaur	57	Sri Renukaji (SC)	Vinay Kumar	INC	22,028	Balbir Singh	BJP	16,868	5,160
Sirmaur	58	Paonta Sahib	Sukh Ram Chaudhary	BJP	36,011	Kirnesh Jung	INC	23,392	12,619
Sirmaur	59	Shillai	Harsh Wardhan Singh Chauhan	INC	29,171	Baldev Singh	BJP	25,046	4,125
Shimla	60	Chopal	Balbir Singh Verma	BJP	29,537	Subhash Chand Manglate	INC	24,950	4,587
Shimla	61	Theog	Rakesh Singha	CPM	24,791	Rakesh Verma	BJP	22,808	1,983
Shimla	62	Kasumpati	Anirudh Singh	INC	22,061	Vijay Jyoti	BJP	12,664	9,397
Shimla	63	Shimla	Suresh Bhardwaj	BJP	14,012	Harish Janartha	Ind	12,109	1,903
Shimla	64	Shimla Rural	Vikramaditya Singh	INC	28,275	Dr. Pramod Sharma	BJP	23,395	4,880
Shimla	65	Jubbal-Kotkhai	Narinder Bragta	BJP	27,466	Rohit Thakur	INC	26,404	1,062
Shimla	66	Rampur (SC)	Nand Lal	INC	25,730	Prem Singh Daraik	BJP	21,693	4,037
Shimla	67	Rohru (SC)	Mohan Lal Brakta	INC	29,134	Shashi Bala	BJP	19,726	9,408
Kinnaur	68	Kinnaur (ST)	Jagat Singh Negi	INC	20,029	Tejwant Singh Negi	BJP	19,909	120

== Bypolls (2017-2022) ==
S.No	Date	Constituency	MLA before election	Party before election	Elected MLA	Party after election
18	21 October 2019	Dharamshala	Kishan Kapoor	Bharatiya Janata Party	Vishal Nehria	Bharatiya Janata Party
55	21 October 2019	Pachhad	Suresh Kumar Kashyap	Bharatiya Janata Party	Reena Kashyap	Bharatiya Janata Party
65	30 October 2021	Jubbal-Kotkhai	Narinder Bragta	Bharatiya Janata Party	Rohit Thakur	Indian National Congress
8	30 October 2021	Fatehpur	Sujan Singh Pathania	Indian National Congress	Bhawani Singh Pathania	Indian National Congress
50	30 October 2021	Arki	Virbhadra Singh	Indian National Congress	Sanjay Awasthy	Indian National Congress
