= Elections in Himachal Pradesh =

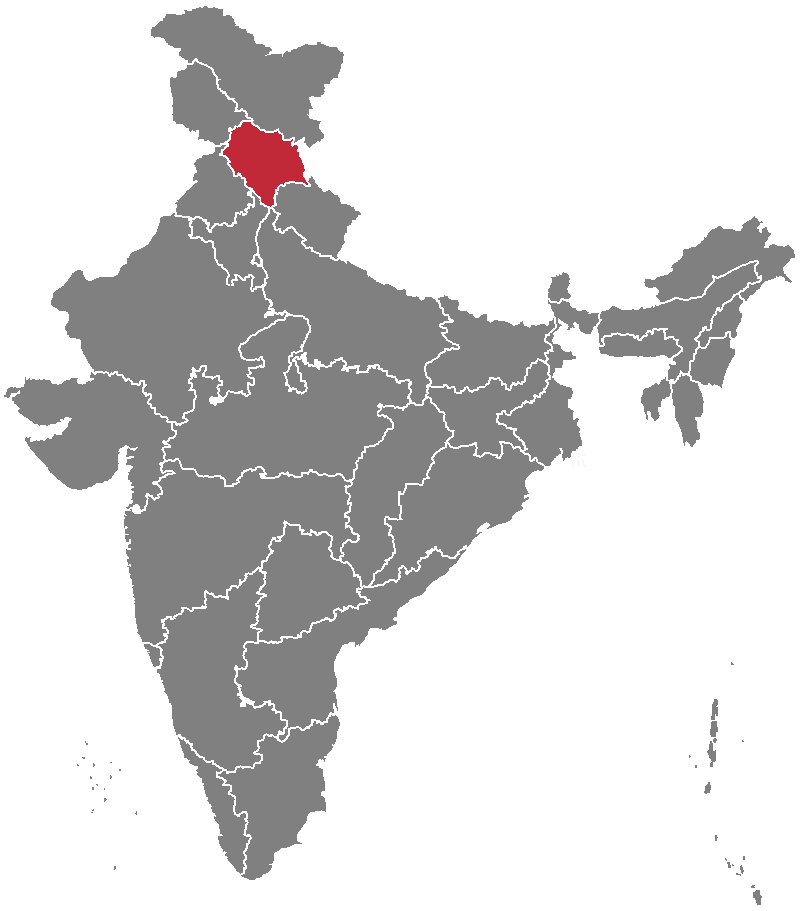
Himachal Pradesh

Elections for the Himachal Pradesh Legislative Assembly in Himachal Pradesh state, India are conducted in accordance with the Constitution of India.

== Lok Sabha elections ==
Year	Lok Sabha	Total seats	Party-wise details
1951	1st	3	INC: 3
1957	2nd	4	INC: 4
1962	3rd	4	INC: 4
1967	4th	6	INC: 6
1971	5th	4	INC: 4
1977	6th	4	JP/BLD: 4.
1980	7th	4	INC: 4
1984	8th	4	INC: 4
1989	9th	4	BJP: 3, INC: 1
1991	10th	4	BJP: 2, INC: 2
1996	11th	4	INC: 4
1998	12th	4	BJP: 3, INC: 1
1999	13th	4	BJP: 3, HVC: 1
2004	14th	4	INC: 3, BJP: 1
2009	15th	4	BJP: 3, INC: 1
2014	16th	4	BJP: 4
2019	17th	4	BJP: 4
2024	18th	4	BJP: 4

== Legislative Assembly elections ==
Election	Assembly	Party-wise details		Chief Minister	Party
Election	Assembly	Party	Seats	Chief Minister	Party
1952	1st	Indian National Congress	24	Yashwant Singh Parmar	INC
1952	1st	Kisan Mazdoor Praja Party	3	Yashwant Singh Parmar	INC
1952	1st	Independent	8	Yashwant Singh Parmar	INC
1952	1st	Republican Party of India	1	Yashwant Singh Parmar	INC
1952	1st	Total	36	Yashwant Singh Parmar	INC
1967	2nd	Indian National Congress	34	Yashwant Singh Parmar	INC
1967	2nd	Bharatiya Jana Sangh	7	Yashwant Singh Parmar	INC
1967	2nd	Independent	16	Yashwant Singh Parmar	INC
1967	2nd	Swatantra Party	2	Yashwant Singh Parmar	INC
1967	2nd	Communist Party of India (Marxist)	2	Yashwant Singh Parmar	INC
1967	2nd	Total	60	Yashwant Singh Parmar	INC
1972	3rd	Indian National Congress	53	Thakur Ram Lal	INC
1972	3rd	Bharatiya Jana Sangh	5	Thakur Ram Lal	INC
1972	3rd	Independent	7	Thakur Ram Lal	INC
1972	3rd	Lok Raj Party Himachal Pradesh	2	Thakur Ram Lal	INC
1972	3rd	Communist Party of India (Marxist)	1	Thakur Ram Lal	INC
1972	3rd	Total	68	Thakur Ram Lal	INC
1977	4th	Janta Party	53	Shanta Kumar	JP
1977	4th	Indian National Congress	9	Shanta Kumar	JP
1977	4th	Independent	6	Shanta Kumar	JP
1977	4th	Total	68	Shanta Kumar	JP
1982	5th	Indian National Congress	31	Thakur Ram Lal	INC
1982	5th	Bharatiya Janta Party	29	Thakur Ram Lal	INC
1982	5th	Independent	6	Thakur Ram Lal	INC
1982	5th	Janata Party	2	Thakur Ram Lal	INC
1982	5th	Total	68	Thakur Ram Lal	INC
1985	6th	Indian National Congress	58	Virbhadra Singh	INC
1985	6th	Bharatiya Janta Party	7	Virbhadra Singh	INC
1985	6th	Independent	2	Virbhadra Singh	INC
1985	6th	Lok Dal	1	Virbhadra Singh	INC
1985	6th	Total	68	Virbhadra Singh	INC
1990	7th	Bharatiya Janta Party	46	Shanta Kumar	BJP
1990	7th	Indian National Congress	9	Shanta Kumar	BJP
1990	7th	Janata Dal	11	Shanta Kumar	BJP
1990	7th	Independent	1	Shanta Kumar	BJP
1990	7th	CPI	1	Shanta Kumar	BJP
1990	7th	Total	68	Shanta Kumar	BJP
1993	8th	Indian National Congress	52	Virbhadra Singh	INC
1993	8th	Bharatiya Janta Party	8	Virbhadra Singh	INC
1993	8th	Independent	7	Virbhadra Singh	INC
1993	8th	Communist Party of India (Marxist)	1	Virbhadra Singh	INC
1993	8th	Total	68	Virbhadra Singh	INC
1998	9th	Bharatiya Janta Party	31	Prem Kumar Dhumal	BJP
1998	9th	Indian National Congress	31	Prem Kumar Dhumal	BJP
1998	9th	Himachal Vikas Congress	5	Prem Kumar Dhumal	BJP
1998	9th	Independent	1	Prem Kumar Dhumal	BJP
1998	9th	Total	68	Prem Kumar Dhumal	BJP
2003	10th	Indian National Congress	43	Virbhadra Singh	INC
2003	10th	Bharatiya Janta Party	16	Virbhadra Singh	INC
2003	10th	Independent	6	Virbhadra Singh	INC
2003	10th	Himachal Vikas Congress	1	Virbhadra Singh	INC
2003	10th	Lok Janshakti Party	1	Virbhadra Singh	INC
2003	10th	Loktantrik Morcha Himachal Pradesh	1	Virbhadra Singh	INC
2003	10th	Total	68	Virbhadra Singh	INC
2007	11th	Bharatiya Janta Party	41	Prem Kumar Dhumal	BJP
2007	11th	Indian National Congress	23	Prem Kumar Dhumal	BJP
2007	11th	Independent	3	Prem Kumar Dhumal	BJP
2007	11th	Bahujan Samaj Party	1	Prem Kumar Dhumal	BJP
2007	11th	Total	68	Prem Kumar Dhumal	BJP
2012	12th	Indian National Congress	36	Virbhadra Singh	INC
2012	12th	Bharatiya Janta Party	26	Virbhadra Singh	INC
2012	12th	Independent	5	Virbhadra Singh	INC
2012	12th	Himachal Lokhit Party	1	Virbhadra Singh	INC
2012	12th	Total	68	Virbhadra Singh	INC
2017	13th	Bharatiya Janta Party	44	Jai Ram Thakur	BJP
2017	13th	Indian National Congress	21	Jai Ram Thakur	BJP
2017	13th	Independent	2	Jai Ram Thakur	BJP
2017	13th	Communist Party of India (Marxist)	1	Jai Ram Thakur	BJP
2017	13th	Total	68	Jai Ram Thakur	BJP
2022	14th	Indian National Congress	40	Sukhvinder Singh Sukhu	INC
2022	14th	Bharatiya Janta Party	25	Sukhvinder Singh Sukhu	INC
2022	14th	Independent	3	Sukhvinder Singh Sukhu	INC
2022	14th	Total	68	Sukhvinder Singh Sukhu	INC

== See also ==
- All India Tribes and Minorities Front
