= Paonta Doon Assembly constituency =

Former Legislative Assembly constituency in Himachal Pradesh, India

Coordinates: 30.44°N 77.59°E

Paonta Doon
- Former constituency for the Himachal Pradesh Legislative Assembly

Constituency details
- Country: India
- Region: North India
- State: Himachal Pradesh
- District: Sirmaur
- Lok Sabha constituency: Shimla
- Established: 1951
- Abolished: 2008
- Total electors: 79,721
- Reservation: None

Paonta Doon was one of the 68 constituencies in the Himachal Pradesh Legislative Assembly of Himachal Pradesh a northern state of India. It was in Sirmaur district and was a part of Shimla Lok Sabha constituency.

== Members of the Legislative Assembly ==
Year	Member	Party
1951	Shiva Nand	Indian National Congress
Himachal Pradesh did not have a Legislative Assembly from 1956 to 1967.
1967	G.S.Chauhan	Indian National Congress
1972	Hirendra Singh	Indian National Congress
1977	Milkh Raj	Independent
1982	Kush Parmar	Indian National Congress
1985	Kush Parmar	Indian National Congress
1990	Fateh Singh	Bharatiya Janata Party
1993	Rattan Singh	Indian National Congress
1998	Rattan Singh	Indian National Congress
2003	Sukh Ram Chaudhary	Bharatiya Janata Party
2007	Sukh Ram Chaudhary	Bharatiya Janata Party

== Election results ==
=== Assembly Election 2007 ===
2007 Himachal Pradesh Legislative Assembly election: Paonta Doon
Party	Candidate	Votes	%	±%
BJP	Sukh Ram Chaudhary	29,322	46.68%	▲6.91
INC	Kirnesh Jung	24,460	38.94%	▲10.76
BSP	Manjinder Singh	7,377	11.74%	New
SP	Vandana Rani	989	1.57%	New
LJP	Om Prakash	649	1.03%	New
Margin of victory		4,862	7.74%	▼2.56
Turnout		62,812	78.79%	▼3.83
Registered electors		79,721		▲15.69
BJP hold		Swing	▲6.91	

=== Assembly Election 2003 ===
2003 Himachal Pradesh Legislative Assembly election: Paonta Doon
Party	Candidate	Votes	%	±%
BJP	Sukh Ram Chaudhary	22,647	39.78%	▲11.48
LHMP	Kirnesh Jung	16,785	29.48%	New
INC	Rattan Singh	16,044	28.18%	▼5.33
HVC	Rajender Mohan	1,459	2.56%	▼3.75
Margin of victory		5,862	10.30%	▲5.09
Turnout		56,935	82.70%	▲6.73
Registered electors		68,911		▲12.55
BJP gain from INC		Swing	▲6.27	

=== Assembly Election 1998 ===
1998 Himachal Pradesh Legislative Assembly election: Paonta Doon
Party	Candidate	Votes	%	±%
INC	Rattan Singh	15,569	33.51%	▼15.74
BJP	Sukh Ram Chaudhary	13,149	28.30%	▼7.99
Independent	Kirnesh Jung	12,697	27.33%	New
HVC	Fateh Singh	2,933	6.31%	New
Shivsena	Ram Lal Sharma	980	2.11%	New
CPI(M)	Bhagat Ram	781	1.68%	New
Margin of victory		2,420	5.21%	▼7.75
Turnout		46,466	77.02%	▼5.25
Registered electors		61,228		▲15.20
INC hold		Swing	▼15.74	

=== Assembly Election 1993 ===
1993 Himachal Pradesh Legislative Assembly election: Paonta Doon
Party	Candidate	Votes	%	±%
INC	Rattan Singh	21,238	49.25%	▲11.97
BJP	Fateh Singh	15,648	36.29%	▼16.86
JD	Kirnesh Jung	5,183	12.02%	New
BSP	Budh Ram	968	2.24%	▲1.52
Margin of victory		5,590	12.96%	▼2.90
Turnout		43,125	81.95%	▲1.52
Registered electors		53,149		▲13.87
INC gain from BJP		Swing	▼3.90	

=== Assembly Election 1990 ===
1990 Himachal Pradesh Legislative Assembly election: Paonta Doon
Party	Candidate	Votes	%	±%
BJP	Fateh Singh	19,750	53.14%	▲15.51
INC	Kush Parmar	13,854	37.28%	▼17.58
Independent	Madhu Sobha	1,054	2.84%	New
Independent	Budh Ram	892	2.40%	New
CPI(M)	Amar Singh Tomar	601	1.62%	New
Independent	Bashir Ahmed	286	0.77%	New
BSP	Jaswant Rai	271	0.73%	New
JP	Pawan Kumar Verma	209	0.56%	New
Margin of victory		5,896	15.86%	▼1.36
Turnout		37,164	80.39%	▼0.14
Registered electors		46,675		▲34.34
BJP gain from INC		Swing	▼1.72	

=== Assembly Election 1985 ===
1985 Himachal Pradesh Legislative Assembly election: Paonta Doon
Party	Candidate	Votes	%	±%
INC	Kush Parmar	15,203	54.86%	▲15.86
BJP	Karam Chand	10,429	37.63%	▲7.71
Independent	Malu Ram	1,497	5.40%	New
Independent	Bisharat Ali	346	1.25%	New
Independent	Mohd. Ismail	237	0.86%	New
Margin of victory		4,774	17.23%	▲8.14
Turnout		27,712	80.73%	▲1.34
Registered electors		34,743		▲5.22
INC hold		Swing	▲15.86	

=== Assembly Election 1982 ===
1982 Himachal Pradesh Legislative Assembly election: Paonta Doon
Party	Candidate	Votes	%	±%
INC	Kush Parmar	10,099	39.00%	▲12.87
BJP	Milkh Raj	7,747	29.92%	New
Independent	Rattan Singh	5,942	22.95%	New
JP	Jagmohan Bhardwaj	644	2.49%	▼18.49
Independent	Bashir	633	2.44%	New
Independent	Budh Ram	323	1.25%	New
Independent	Swaran Singh	315	1.22%	New
Independent	Sunder Lal	189	0.73%	New
Margin of victory		2,352	9.08%	▼4.09
Turnout		25,892	79.85%	▲7.03
Registered electors		33,018		▲21.22
INC gain from Independent		Swing	▼0.30	

=== Assembly Election 1977 ===
1977 Himachal Pradesh Legislative Assembly election: Paonta Doon
Party	Candidate	Votes	%	±%
Independent	Milkh Raj	7,643	39.31%	New
INC	Rattan Singh	5,081	26.13%	▼32.13
JP	Chander Mohan	4,078	20.97%	New
Independent	Jagat Singh	2,196	11.29%	New
Independent	Sant Ram	272	1.40%	New
Independent	Sushil Kumar Gupta	174	0.89%	New
Margin of victory		2,562	13.18%	▼3.35
Turnout		19,444	72.62%	▲12.58
Registered electors		27,237		▲12.39
Independent gain from INC		Swing	▼18.95	

=== Assembly Election 1972 ===
1972 Himachal Pradesh Legislative Assembly election: Paonta Doon
Party	Candidate	Votes	%	±%
INC	Hirendra Singh	8,304	58.26%	▼15.48
ABJS	Milkh Raj	5,949	41.74%	▲15.48
Margin of victory		2,355	16.52%	▼30.96
Turnout		14,253	61.39%	▲6.32
Registered electors		24,235		▼19.14
INC hold		Swing		

=== Assembly Election 1967 ===
1967 Himachal Pradesh Legislative Assembly election: Paonta Doon
Party	Candidate	Votes	%	±%
INC	G. S. Chauhan	11,601	73.74%	▲11.44
ABJS	V. Singh	4,131	26.26%	New
Margin of victory		7,470	47.48%	▲22.87
Turnout		15,732	55.41%	▲14.24
Registered electors		29,970		▲90.88
INC hold		Swing	▲11.44	

=== Assembly Election 1952 ===
1952 Himachal Pradesh Legislative Assembly election: Paonta Doon
Party	Candidate	Votes	%	±%
INC	Shiva Nand	3,742	62.30%	New
KMPP	Sher Jang	2,264	37.70%	New
Margin of victory		1,478	24.61%	
Turnout		6,006	38.25%	
Registered electors		15,701		
INC win (new seat)				
