= Solan Assembly constituency =

Legislative Assembly constituency in Himachal Pradesh State, India

Coordinates: 30.91°N 77.1°E

Solan
- Constituency No. 53 for the Himachal Pradesh Legislative Assembly

Constituency details
- Country: India
- Region: North India
- State: Himachal Pradesh
- District: Solan
- Lok Sabha constituency: Shimla
- Established: 1951
- Total electors: 86,333
- Reservation: SC

Member of Legislative Assembly
- 14th Himachal Pradesh Legislative Assembly
- Incumbent Dhani Ram Shandil
- Party: Indian National Congress
- Elected year: 2022

Solan is one of the 68 assembly constituencies of Himachal Pradesh a northern Indian state. Solan is also part of Shimla Lok Sabha constituency.

== Members of the Legislative Assembly ==
Year	Member	Picture	Party
1951	Hira Singh Pal		Independent
1951	Ram Dass		Scheduled Castes Federation
1952	Hira Singh Pal		Praja Socialist Party
1967	K. Ram		Indian National Congress
1972	Krishan Datt		Independent
1977	Gauri Shankar		Janata Party
1982	Rama Nand		Bharatiya Janata Party
1985	Gian Chand Totu		Indian National Congress
1990	Mahender Nath Sofat		Bharatiya Janata Party
1993	Krishna Mohini		Indian National Congress
1998	Krishna Mohini		Indian National Congress
2000★	Rajeev Bindal		Bharatiya Janata Party
2003	Rajeev Bindal		Bharatiya Janata Party
2007	Rajeev Bindal		Bharatiya Janata Party
2012	Dhani Ram Shandil		Indian National Congress
2017	Dhani Ram Shandil		Indian National Congress
2022	Dhani Ram Shandil		Indian National Congress

★By Elections

== Election results ==
=== Assembly Election 2022 ===
2022 Himachal Pradesh Legislative Assembly election: Solan
Party	Candidate	Votes	%	±%
INC	Dr. Dhani Ram Shandil	30,089	51.54%	▲3.74
BJP	Rajesh Kashyap	26,231	44.93%	▼1.64
AAP	Anju	1,108	1.90%	New
NOTA	Nota	634	1.09%	▼0.11
BSP	Rajinder	323	0.55%	New
Margin of victory		3,858	6.61%	▲5.38
Turnout		58,385	67.63%	▲0.16
Registered electors		86,333		▲6.25
INC hold		Swing	▲3.74	

=== Assembly Election 2017 ===
2017 Himachal Pradesh Legislative Assembly election: Solan
Party	Candidate	Votes	%	±%
INC	Dr. Dhani Ram Shandil	26,200	47.79%	▼2.12
BJP	Rajesh Kashyap	25,529	46.57%	▲5.86
CPI(M)	Ajay Bhatti	1,632	2.98%	New
NOTA	None of the Above	656	1.20%	New
Independent	Shashi Kant Chauhan	389	0.71%	New
Margin of victory		671	1.22%	▼7.98
Turnout		54,819	67.47%	▲0.08
Registered electors		81,255		▲12.70
INC hold		Swing	▼2.12	

=== Assembly Election 2012 ===
2012 Himachal Pradesh Legislative Assembly election: Solan
Party	Candidate	Votes	%	±%
INC	Dr. Dhani Ram Shandil	24,250	49.91%	▲6.13
BJP	Kumari Sheela	19,778	40.71%	▼11.26
HLC	Om Parkash Kant	2,044	4.21%	New
Independent	Hira Nand Kashyap	1,257	2.59%	New
AITC	Rajesh Kumar (Thallu Bhai)	563	1.16%	New
Margin of victory		4,472	9.20%	▲1.02
Turnout		48,584	67.38%	▲5.49
Registered electors		72,100		▼1.71
INC gain from BJP		Swing	▼2.06	

=== Assembly Election 2007 ===
2007 Himachal Pradesh Legislative Assembly election: Solan
Party	Candidate	Votes	%	±%
BJP	Dr. Rajeev Bindal	23,597	51.97%	▲17.75
INC	Dr. Kailash Prashar	19,881	43.78%	▲19.98
BSP	Rajesh Kumar Jindal	1,387	3.05%	New
Independent	Dev Raj	412	0.91%	New
Margin of victory		3,716	8.18%	▲5.15
Turnout		45,406	61.90%	▼6.81
Registered electors		73,356		▲12.50
BJP hold		Swing	▲17.75	

=== Assembly Election 2003 ===
2003 Himachal Pradesh Legislative Assembly election: Solan
Party	Candidate	Votes	%	±%
BJP	Dr. Rajeev Bindal	15,332	34.22%	New
Independent	Mohinder Nath Sofat	13,973	31.19%	New
INC	Major Krishna Mohini	10,665	23.81%	▼6.79
HVC	Mohinder Sharma	2,742	6.12%	New
LHMP	Haminder Singh Thakur	1,576	3.52%	New
NCP	C. R. Thakur	254	0.57%	New
Margin of victory		1,359	3.03%	▼6.37
Turnout		44,800	68.78%	▲8.11
Registered electors		65,204		▲5.07
BJP gain from Republican Janata Party		Swing	▼5.78	

=== Assembly By-election 2000 ===
2000 Himachal Pradesh Legislative Assembly by-election: Solan
Party	Candidate	Votes	%	±%
Republican Janata Party	Dr. Rajeev Bindal	15,042	40.00%	New
INC	Major Krishna Mohini	11,505	30.59%	▼2.97
Independent	Netar Singh	11,059	29.41%	New
Margin of victory		3,537	9.41%	▲9.33
Turnout		37,606	60.92%	▼4.59
Registered electors		62,057		▲11.20
Republican Janata Party gain from INC		Swing		

=== Assembly Election 1998 ===
1998 Himachal Pradesh Legislative Assembly election: Solan
Party	Candidate	Votes	%	±%
INC	Krishna Mohini	12,210	33.56%	▼30.82
BJP	Mohinder Nath Sofat	12,184	33.49%	▲1.31
Independent	Haminder Singh Thakur	9,739	26.77%	New
HVC	Vinod Kumar	1,063	2.92%	New
CPI	Jagdish Chander Bhardwaj	598	1.64%	▼0.02
SP	Ravinder Nath Parihar	512	1.41%	New
Margin of victory		26	0.07%	▼32.14
Turnout		36,378	66.30%	▼6.40
Registered electors		55,805		▲10.98
INC hold		Swing	▼30.82	

=== Assembly Election 1993 ===
1993 Himachal Pradesh Legislative Assembly election: Solan
Party	Candidate	Votes	%	±%
INC	Krishna Mohini	23,177	64.39%	▲28.14
BJP	Mohinder Nath Sofat	11,583	32.18%	▼14.91
CPI	Nagdish Bhardwaj	598	1.66%	New
JD	Kul Rakesh Pant	261	0.73%	New
Margin of victory		11,594	32.21%	▲21.37
Turnout		35,996	72.06%	▲14.49
Registered electors		50,283		▲13.78
INC gain from BJP		Swing	▲17.30	

=== Assembly Election 1990 ===
1990 Himachal Pradesh Legislative Assembly election: Solan
Party	Candidate	Votes	%	±%
BJP	Mohinder Nath Sofat	11,882	47.09%	▲22.81
INC	Gian Chand	9,147	36.25%	▼37.24
Independent	Rama Nand	2,581	10.23%	New
Independent	Jagdish Chander Bhardwaj	1,076	4.26%	New
Independent	Prem Sagar	239	0.95%	New
Margin of victory		2,735	10.84%	▼38.37
Turnout		25,233	57.44%	▼3.64
Registered electors		44,193		▲30.49
BJP gain from INC		Swing	▼26.40	

=== Assembly Election 1985 ===
1985 Himachal Pradesh Legislative Assembly election: Solan
Party	Candidate	Votes	%	±%
INC	Gian Chand Totu	15,117	73.49%	New
BJP	Rama Nand	4,995	24.28%	▼5.68
Independent	Harbans Lal Sharma	263	1.28%	New
Margin of victory		10,122	49.21%	▲35.72
Turnout		20,570	61.16%	▼4.34
Registered electors		33,867		▲5.59
INC gain from BJP		Swing	▲43.53	

=== Assembly Election 1982 ===
1982 Himachal Pradesh Legislative Assembly election: Solan
Party	Candidate	Votes	%	±%
BJP	Rama Nand	6,253	29.96%	New
Independent	Guru Dutt	3,437	16.47%	New
JP	Kul Rakesh	3,418	16.38%	▼32.05
Independent	Harbans Lal Sharma	1,508	7.22%	New
Independent	Dayal Dutt	1,490	7.14%	New
Independent	Ram Krishan	1,483	7.11%	New
Independent	Gokal Chand Mehta	1,077	5.16%	New
Independent	Gauri Shankar	573	2.75%	New
Independent	Rajinder Kumar Garg	504	2.41%	New
CPI	Keshav Verma	315	1.51%	New
Independent	Kishori Lal Hans	226	1.08%	New
Margin of victory		2,816	13.49%	▼16.61
Turnout		20,872	65.75%	▲10.95
Registered electors		32,073		▲13.27
BJP gain from JP		Swing	▼18.47	

=== Assembly Election 1977 ===
1977 Himachal Pradesh Legislative Assembly election: Solan
Party	Candidate	Votes	%	±%
JP	Gauri Shankar	7,422	48.42%	New
Independent	Ishwar Singh	2,809	18.33%	New
INC	Dayal Dutt	2,530	16.51%	▼22.21
Independent	Kul Rakesh	1,951	12.73%	New
Independent	Varinder Kumar	493	3.22%	New
Margin of victory		4,613	30.10%	▲20.82
Turnout		15,327	54.66%	▲14.92
Registered electors		28,315		▲4.72
JP gain from Independent		Swing	▲0.42	

=== Assembly Election 1972 ===
1972 Himachal Pradesh Legislative Assembly election: Solan
Party	Candidate	Votes	%	±%
Independent	Krishan Datt	5,089	48.00%	New
INC	Daropti Devi	4,105	38.72%	▼7.81
ABJS	Itwari Lal	865	8.16%	▼3.11
Independent	Kishan Dass	383	3.61%	New
Independent	Telu Ram Baidwan	160	1.51%	New
Margin of victory		984	9.28%	▼15.03
Turnout		10,602	40.23%	▼4.15
Registered electors		27,039		▲19.17
Independent gain from INC		Swing	▲1.47	

=== Assembly Election 1967 ===
1967 Himachal Pradesh Legislative Assembly election: Solan
Party	Candidate	Votes	%	±%
INC	K. Ram	4,578	46.53%	▲46.37
Independent	K. Datt	2,186	22.22%	New
CPI	P. C. Premi	1,965	19.97%	New
ABJS	S. Ram	1,109	11.27%	New
Margin of victory		2,392	24.31%	▲20.99
Turnout		9,838	45.55%	▼17.55
Registered electors		22,690		▼20.13
INC gain from Independent		Swing	▲25.11	

=== Assembly Election 1952 ===
1952 Himachal Pradesh Legislative Assembly election: Solan
Party	Candidate	Votes	%	±%
Independent	Hira Singh Pal	3,707	21.42%	New
Independent	Chinta Mani	3,132	18.10%	New
SCF	Ram Dass	3,092	17.87%	New
INC	Keshav Ram	2,837	16.40%	New
INC	Hari Dass	2,821	16.30%	New
Independent	Phagoo	1,280	7.40%	New
ABHM	Ram Lal	435	2.51%	New
Margin of victory		575	3.32%	
Turnout		17,304	60.91%	
Registered electors		28,409		
Independent win (new seat)				

== See also ==
- List of constituencies of the Himachal Pradesh Legislative Assembly
- Solan
- Solan district
- Shimla Lok Sabha constituency
