= 2019 Indian general election in Himachal Pradesh =

Indian lower house election in Himachal state

- 19 May 2019

All 4 Himachal Pradesh seats in Lok Sabha
- Turnout: 72.42% (▲7.97%)
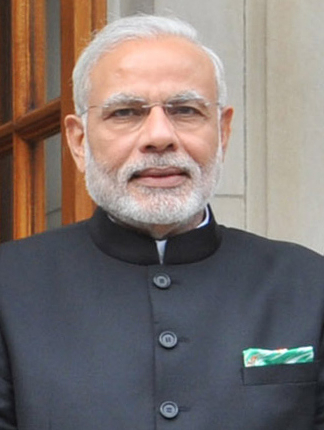

	First party	Second party
Party	BJP	INC
Alliance	NDA	UPA
Last election	4	0
Seats won	4	0
Seat change	Steady	Steady
Percentage	69.11%	27.30%
Swing	▲16.11%	▼13.70%
- Results of elections in Himachal Pradesh by constituency.
Prime Minister before election
Narendra Modi
BJP
Prime Minister after election
Narendra Modi
BJP

The 2019 Indian general election held in India on 19 May 2019 to constitute the 17th Lok Sabha.

== Parties and alliances ==
=== National Democratic Alliance ===
Party	Flag	Symbol	Leader	Seats contested
Bharatiya Janata Party			Anurag Thakur	4

=== United Progressive Alliance ===
Party	Flag	Symbol	Leader	Seats contested
Indian National Congress			Virbhadra Singh	4

== Candidates ==
Constituency					
Constituency		NDA		UPA	
1	Kangra	BJP	Kishan Kapoor	INC	Pawan Kajal
2	Mandi	BJP	Ram Swaroop Sharma	INC	Ashray Sharma
3	Hamirpur	BJP	Anurag Thakur	INC	Ram Lal Thakur
4	Shimla (SC)	BJP	Suresh Kumar Kashyap	INC	Dhani Ram Shandil

== Results ==
=== Results by Party ===
Party Name	Popular vote			Seats		
Party Name	Votes	%	±pp	Contested	Won	+/−
BJP	2,661,281	69.11	▲15.76	4	4	Steady
INC	1,051,113	27.30	▼13.38	4	0	Steady
Others	69,620	1.65	Steady	19	0	Steady
IND	35,710	0.93	▲0.01	18	0	Steady
NOTA	33,008	0.86	▼0.08			
Total	3,850,732	100	-	45	4	-

=== Detailed Results ===
No	Constituency	Turnout	Winner	Party	Votes	Runner-up	Party	Votes	Margin
1	Kangra	70.73 ▲	Kishan Kapoor	BJP	7,25,218	Pawan Kajal	INC	2,47,595	4,77,623
2	Mandi	73.60 ▲	Ram Swaroop Sharma	BJP	6,47,189	Ashray Sharma	INC	2,41,730	4,05,559
3	Hamirpur	72.83 ▲	Anurag Thakur	BJP	6,82,292	Ram Lal Thakur	INC	2,83,120	3,99,572
4	Shimla (SC)	72.68 ▲	Suresh Kumar Kashyap	BJP	6,06,183	Dhani Ram Shandil	INC	2,78,668	3,27,515

== Post-election Union Council of Ministers from Himachal Pradesh ==
#	Name	Constituency	Designation	Department	From	To	Party
1	Anurag Singh Thakur	Hamirpur	Cabinet Minister; MoS	Minister of Information and Broadcasting (Cabinet from July 2021); Minister of Youth Affairs and Sports (Cabinet from July 2021); MoS in the Ministry of Finance (until July 2021); MoS in the Ministry of Corporate Affairs (until July 2021)	31 May 2019	9 June 2024	BJP

== Assembly segments wise lead of parties ==
2019 Himachal Pradesh Lok Sabha Elections Assembly Wise Map

Party	Position in Assembly (as of 2017 election)	Assembly segment leads (in 2019)	Position in Assembly (as of 2022 election)
Bharatiya Janata Party	44	68	25
Indian National Congress	21	–	40
Communist Party of India	1	–	–
Others	2	–	3
Total	68		
