= Ram Kumar Chaudhary =

Indian politician

Chief Parliamentary Secretary, Government of Himachal Pradesh
- Incumbent
- Assumed office 8 January 2023
- Governor: Rajendra Arlekar (2022–2023); Shiv Pratap Shukla (2023–2026); Kavinder Gupta (2026–present)
- Chief Minister: Sukhvinder Singh Sukhu
- Deputy CM: Mukesh Agnihotri
- Departments: TCP Department; Industries Department; Revenue Department

Member of the Himachal Pradesh Legislative Assembly
- Incumbent
- Assumed office 8 December 2022
- Preceded by: Paramjeet Singh
- Constituency: Doon
- In office 25 December 2012 – 18 December 2017
- Preceded by: Vinod Chandel
- Succeeded by: Paramjeet Singh
- Constituency: Doon

Personal details
- Born: 2 March 1969 (age 57) Solan, Himachal Pradesh, India
- Party: Indian National Congress
- Spouse: Smt Kuldeep Kaur
- Children: 1 Son & 1 Daughter
- Education: Post Graduate (Public Administration)
- Occupation: Politician

Ram Kumar Chaudhary is an Indian politician belonging to Indian National Congress. He is a member of Himachal Pradesh Legislative Assembly.

== Early life and education ==
Ram Kumar Chaudhary, born on 2 March 1969 in Village Haripur Sandoli, Distt. Solan, Himachal Pradesh, is a prominent figure known for his multifaceted involvement in agriculture, business, industry, real estate, and transportation. He is the son of Late Smt. Rattani Devi and Late Shri Lajja Ram, a former Chief Parliamentary Secretary.

Ram Kumar Chaudhary holds an M.A. in Public Administration.

== Personal life ==
He is married to Kuldeep Kaur (Nidhi) and is father of one son and one daughter.

== Political career ==
Ram Kumar Chaudhary has a significant political career with contributions at various levels:

- President, Haripur Sandoli Gram Sudhar Sabha
- General Secretary:
  - NSUI (National Students' Union of India) from 1993 to 1995
  - State Youth Congress in 2003
  - Himachal Pradesh Congress Committee from 2008 to 2018
- Chairman, Zila Parishad, Distt. Solan, from 2006 to 2011
- Vice President, Himachal Pradesh Congress Committee, since 2018

He was elected to the State Legislative Assembly in 2012 and has actively participated in different committees, including the General Development & Subordinate Legislation Committees in 2014 and the Estimates & Human Development Committees in 2016–2017.

Ram Kumar Chaudhary was re-elected to the State Legislative Assembly in December 2022. Notably, he was appointed the Chief Parliamentary Secretary on 8 January 2023, with responsibilities attached to the Chief Minister, Industries Minister, and Revenue Minister for TCP Department, Industries Department, and Revenue Department, respectively.

== Favorite Pastime ==
His favorite pastimes include reading and gardening.

== Languages known ==
Ram Kumar Chaudhary is fluent in Hindi and English.
