= Doon Assembly constituency =

Legislative Assembly constituency in Himachal Pradesh State, India

Coordinates: 30.69°N 77.17°E

Doon
- Constituency No. 52 for the Himachal Pradesh Legislative Assembly

Constituency details
- Country: India
- Region: North India
- State: Himachal Pradesh
- District: Solan
- Lok Sabha constituency: Shimla
- Established: 1967
- Total electors: 71,948
- Reservation: None

Member of Legislative Assembly
- 14th Himachal Pradesh Legislative Assembly
- Incumbent Ram Kumar
- Party: Indian National Congress
- Elected year: 2022

Doon Assembly constituency is one of the 68 assembly constituencies of Himachal Pradesh a northern Indian state. Doon is also part of Shimla Lok Sabha constituency.

== Members of the Legislative Assembly ==
Year	Member	Picture	Party
1967	Lekh Ram		Independent
1972	Lekh Ram		Indian National Congress
1977	Ram Partap Chandel		Independent
1982	Ram Partap Chandel		Indian National Congress
1985	Ram Partap Chandel		Indian National Congress
1990	Chaudhary Lajja Ram		Janata Dal
1993	Chaudhary Lajja Ram		Indian National Congress
1998	Chaudhary Lajja Ram		Indian National Congress
2003	Chaudhary Lajja Ram		Indian National Congress
2007	Vinod Chandel		Bharatiya Janata Party
2012	Ram Kumar		Indian National Congress
2017	Paramjeet Singh		Bharatiya Janata Party
2022	Ram Kumar		Indian National Congress

== Election results ==
=== Assembly Election 2022 ===
2022 Himachal Pradesh Legislative Assembly election: Doon
Party	Candidate	Votes	%	±%
INC	Ram Kumar Chaudhary	32,038	51.89%	▲6.77
BJP	Paramjeet Singh	25,227	40.86%	▼11.94
Independent	Des Raj Chauhan	1,895	3.07%	New
Rashtriya Devbhumi Party	Balwant Singh	1,425	2.31%	New
AAP	Swarn Singh Saini	659	1.07%	New
BSP	Nagender Chand	276	0.45%	New
NOTA	Nota	224	0.36%	▼0.25
Margin of victory		6,811	11.03%	▲3.35
Turnout		61,744	85.82%	▼4.08
Registered electors		71,948		▲14.98
INC gain from BJP		Swing	▼0.91	

=== Assembly Election 2017 ===
2017 Himachal Pradesh Legislative Assembly election: Doon
Party	Candidate	Votes	%	±%
BJP	Paramjeet Singh	29,701	52.80%	▲34.60
INC	Ram Kumar Chaudhary	25,382	45.12%	▲12.22
Independent	Inder Singh Thakur	436	0.78%	New
NOTA	None of the Above	345	0.61%	New
Margin of victory		4,319	7.68%	▼0.44
Turnout		56,256	89.90%	▲0.88
Registered electors		62,577		▲18.08
BJP gain from INC		Swing	▲19.90	

=== Assembly Election 2012 ===
2012 Himachal Pradesh Legislative Assembly election: Doon
Party	Candidate	Votes	%	±%
INC	Ram Kumar Chaudhary	15,520	32.90%	▼4.35
Independent	Darshan Singh	11,690	24.78%	New
Independent	Paramjeet Singh	10,429	22.11%	New
BJP	Vinod Kumari	8,584	18.20%	▼25.91
Independent	Amar Singh Thakur	354	0.75%	New
HLC	Daljeet Singh	335	0.71%	New
BSP	Roop Singh	238	0.50%	▼16.62
Margin of victory		3,830	8.12%	▲1.26
Turnout		47,174	89.01%	▲7.08
Registered electors		52,996		▼14.77
INC gain from BJP		Swing	▼11.21	

=== Assembly Election 2007 ===
2007 Himachal Pradesh Legislative Assembly election: Doon
Party	Candidate	Votes	%	±%
BJP	Vinod Kumari	22,470	44.11%	▲26.74
INC	Ch. Lajja Ram	18,974	37.25%	▲0.95
BSP	Darshan Singh	8,726	17.13%	New
SP	Prem Sagar-Fauji	744	1.46%	New
Margin of victory		3,496	6.86%	▲1.78
Turnout		50,943	81.93%	▲0.09
Registered electors		62,178		▲6.78
BJP gain from INC		Swing	▲7.81	

=== Assembly Election 2003 ===
2003 Himachal Pradesh Legislative Assembly election: Doon
Party	Candidate	Votes	%	±%
INC	Lajja Ram	17,297	36.29%	▼2.02
LHMP	Vinod Kumari	14,877	31.22%	New
BJP	Dhian Singh	8,278	17.37%	▲7.31
HVC	Amar Nath Kaushal	5,659	11.87%	▲6.57
CPI	Ramjan Mohammad	786	1.65%	New
Independent	Hari Ram Kaushal	761	1.60%	New
Margin of victory		2,420	5.08%	▼2.46
Turnout		47,658	81.93%	▲5.05
Registered electors		58,230		▲7.07
INC hold		Swing	▼2.02	

=== Assembly Election 1998 ===
1998 Himachal Pradesh Legislative Assembly election: Doon
Party	Candidate	Votes	%	±%
INC	Lajja Ram	16,002	38.32%	▲0.05
Independent	Vinod Kumari	12,854	30.78%	New
Independent	Bhagwan Dass	6,028	14.43%	New
BJP	Shri Kant	4,201	10.06%	▼2.42
HVC	Amar Nath Kaushal	2,217	5.31%	New
Independent	Brijendra Sharma	460	1.10%	New
Margin of victory		3,148	7.54%	▲6.06
Turnout		41,762	78.22%	▼0.41
Registered electors		54,383		▲9.88
INC hold		Swing	▲0.05	

=== Assembly Election 1993 ===
1993 Himachal Pradesh Legislative Assembly election: Doon
Party	Candidate	Votes	%	±%
INC	Lajja Ram	14,622	38.27%	▲16.84
Independent	Ram Partap Chandel	14,059	36.79%	New
BJP	Inder Pal Singh	4,768	12.48%	New
Independent	Gian Chand Panwar	2,281	5.97%	New
BSP	Shyam Dhiman	1,379	3.61%	▲0.43
CPI	Vishveshwar Parsad	938	2.45%	▼0.05
Margin of victory		563	1.47%	▼23.27
Turnout		38,209	77.78%	▲3.95
Registered electors		49,492		▲19.77
INC gain from JD		Swing	▼7.90	

=== Assembly Election 1990 ===
1990 Himachal Pradesh Legislative Assembly election: Doon
Party	Candidate	Votes	%	±%
JD	Lajja Ram	13,974	46.17%	New
INC	Lekh Ram	6,485	21.42%	▼25.86
Independent	Ram Pratap Chandel	6,467	21.37%	New
BSP	Ram Dass	963	3.18%	New
CPI	Kaum Sudhar Kaundal	757	2.50%	New
Independent	Parkash Chand	604	2.00%	New
Independent	Om Prakash Sharma	428	1.41%	New
JP	Mahender Kumar	390	1.29%	New
Margin of victory		7,489	24.74%	▲19.23
Turnout		30,269	74.08%	▼6.49
Registered electors		41,324		▲31.17
JD gain from INC		Swing	▼1.12	

=== Assembly Election 1985 ===
1985 Himachal Pradesh Legislative Assembly election: Doon
Party	Candidate	Votes	%	±%
INC	Ram Pratap Chandel	11,878	47.28%	▼5.46
Independent	Lekh Ram	10,494	41.77%	New
BJP	Brijayendra Sharma	1,137	4.53%	▼18.06
Independent	Jaswant Singh	1,020	4.06%	New
Independent	Mast Ram	592	2.36%	New
Margin of victory		1,384	5.51%	▼24.65
Turnout		25,121	80.61%	▲0.09
Registered electors		31,503		▲8.15
INC hold		Swing	▼5.46	

=== Assembly Election 1982 ===
1982 Himachal Pradesh Legislative Assembly election: Doon
Party	Candidate	Votes	%	±%
INC	Ram Partap Chandel	12,236	52.74%	▲27.78
BJP	Narain Dass	5,239	22.58%	New
Independent	Lekh Ram	4,415	19.03%	New
Independent	Ram Rattan	977	4.21%	New
Independent	Amar Nath	140	0.60%	New
LKD	Kamal Chand	123	0.53%	New
Margin of victory		6,997	30.16%	▲18.44
Turnout		23,200	80.75%	▲5.13
Registered electors		29,128		▲13.39
INC gain from Independent		Swing	▲11.86	

=== Assembly Election 1977 ===
1977 Himachal Pradesh Legislative Assembly election: Doon
Party	Candidate	Votes	%	±%
Independent	Ram Pratap	7,827	40.88%	New
JP	Krishna Mohini	5,583	29.16%	New
INC	Kekh Ram	4,778	24.96%	▼30.26
Independent	Bhupinder Singh	891	4.65%	New
Margin of victory		2,244	11.72%	▼21.34
Turnout		19,144	75.21%	▲10.64
Registered electors		25,689		▲1.08
Independent gain from INC		Swing	▼14.33	

=== Assembly Election 1972 ===
1972 Himachal Pradesh Legislative Assembly election: Doon
Party	Candidate	Votes	%	±%
INC	Lekh Ram	8,965	55.22%	▲25.16
Independent	Laxaman Singh	3,597	22.15%	New
INC(O)	Hari Dass	1,728	10.64%	New
Independent	Ram Partap Chandel	1,515	9.33%	New
ABJS	Sarban Singh	431	2.65%	New
Margin of victory		5,368	33.06%	▲25.09
Turnout		16,236	65.47%	▼1.94
Registered electors		25,414		▲10.04
INC gain from Independent		Swing	▲17.18	

=== Assembly Election 1967 ===
1967 Himachal Pradesh Legislative Assembly election: Doon
Party	Candidate	Votes	%	±%
Independent	Lekh Ram	5,782	38.03%	New
INC	S. Ram	4,570	30.06%	New
Independent	L. Madhur	4,528	29.78%	New
Independent	K. Singh	323	2.12%	New
Margin of victory		1,212	7.97%	
Turnout		15,203	68.31%	
Registered electors		23,096		
Independent win (new seat)				

== See also ==
- List of constituencies of the Himachal Pradesh Legislative Assembly
- Solan district
- Shimla Lok Sabha constituency
