= Jhanduta Assembly constituency =

Legislative Assembly constituency in Himachal Pradesh State, India

Coordinates: 31.37°N 76.64°E

Jhanduta
- Constituency No. 46 for the Himachal Pradesh Legislative Assembly

Constituency details
- Country: India
- Region: North India
- State: Himachal Pradesh
- District: Bilaspur
- Lok Sabha constituency: Hamirpur
- Established: 2008
- Total electors: 80,977
- Reservation: SC

Member of Legislative Assembly
- 14th Himachal Pradesh Legislative Assembly
- Incumbent Jeet Ram Katwal
- Party: Bharatiya Janata Party
- Elected year: 2022

Jhanduta is one of the 68 assembly constituencies of Himachal Pradesh a northern Indian state. It is also part of Hamirpur, Himachal Pradesh Lok Sabha constituency.

== Members of the Legislative Assembly ==
Year	Member	Picture	Party
2012	Rikhi Ram Kaundal		Bharatiya Janata Party
2017	Jeet Ram Katwal		Bharatiya Janata Party
2022	Jeet Ram Katwal		Bharatiya Janata Party

== Election results ==
=== Assembly Election 2022 ===
2022 Himachal Pradesh Legislative Assembly election: Jhanduta
Party	Candidate	Votes	%	±%
BJP	Jeet Ram Katwal	28,268	46.72%	▼6.35
INC	Vivek Kumar	22,469	37.14%	▼6.86
Independent	Raj Kumar Kaundal	8,358	13.81%	New
AAP	Sudhir Kumar Suman	427	0.71%	New
Rashtriya Devbhumi Party	Manoj Kumar	282	0.47%	New
NOTA	Nota	246	0.41%	▼0.73
BSP	Amar Nath	245	0.40%	New
Independent	Jitender Pal	206	0.34%	New
Margin of victory		5,799	9.58%	▲0.51
Turnout		60,501	74.71%	▼0.88
Registered electors		80,977		▲11.92
BJP hold		Swing	▼6.35	

=== Assembly Election 2017 ===
2017 Himachal Pradesh Legislative Assembly election: Jhanduta
Party	Candidate	Votes	%	±%
BJP	Jeet Ram Katwal	29,030	53.07%	▲4.16
INC	Beeru Ram Kishore	24,068	44.00%	▼2.35
NOTA	None of the Above	624	1.14%	New
Margin of victory		4,962	9.07%	▲6.52
Turnout		54,699	75.60%	▲5.78
Registered electors		72,355		▲7.69
BJP hold		Swing		

=== Assembly Election 2012 ===
2012 Himachal Pradesh Legislative Assembly election: Jhanduta
Party	Candidate	Votes	%	±%
BJP	Rikhi Ram Kaundal	22,941	48.91%	New
INC	Dr. Beeru Ram Kishore	21,742	46.35%	New
HLC	Kashmir Singh Jamwal	791	1.69%	New
Independent	Vijay Kumar Kaushal	764	1.63%	New
BSP	Anup Chand Bhatia	590	1.26%	New
Margin of victory		1,199	2.56%	
Turnout		46,906	69.82%	
Registered electors		67,186		
BJP win (new seat)				

== See also ==
- List of constituencies of the Himachal Pradesh Legislative Assembly
- Bilaspur district, Himachal Pradesh
- Hamirpur, Himachal Pradesh Lok Sabha constituency
