= Jai Krishan Sharma =

Indian teacher, agriculturist, and politician (1943–2019)

MLA of Santokhgarh
- In office 1998–2003
- Preceded by: Vijay Kumar Joshi
- Succeeded by: Mukesh Agnihotri

President, Bharatiya Janata Party, Himachal Pradesh
- In office 2000–2003
- Preceded by: Suresh Chandel
- Succeeded by: Suresh Bhardwaj

Personal details
- Born: 11 February 1943 Nanihal, Punjab, British India
- Died: 10 September 2019 (aged 76) Haroli, Himachal Pradesh, India
- Party: Bharatiya Janata Party

Jai Krishan Sharma (11 February 1943 – 10 September 2019) was an Indian teacher, agriculturist and politician belonging to Bharatiya Janata Party. He was elected as a member of Himachal Pradesh Legislative Assembly from Santokhgarh in 1998. He served as President of Himachal Pradesh Bharatiya Janata Party from 2000 to 2003. He died on 10 September 2019.
