= Vidya Sagar Chaudhary =

Indian politician (died 2019)

Vidya Sagar Chaudhary (1933/34 – 25 April 2019) was an Indian politician and member of the Bharatiya Janata Party. Chaudhary was a member of the Himachal Pradesh Legislative Assembly from the Kangra constituency in Kangra district.

He died on 25 April 2019 at the age of 85.
