= Chopal Assembly constituency =

Legislative Assembly constituency in Himachal Pradesh State, India

Coordinates: 30.95°N 77.59°E

Chopal (Chaupal)
- Constituency No. 60 for the Himachal Pradesh Legislative Assembly

Constituency details
- Country: India
- Region: North India
- State: Himachal Pradesh
- District: Shimla
- Lok Sabha constituency: Shimla
- Established: 1967
- Total electors: 81,782
- Reservation: None

Member of Legislative Assembly
- 14th Himachal Pradesh Legislative Assembly
- Incumbent Balbir Singh Verma
- Party: Bharatiya Janata Party
- Elected year: 2022

Chopal Assembly constituency is one of the 68 constituencies in the Himachal Pradesh Legislative Assembly of Himachal Pradesh a northern state of India. Chopal is also part of Shimla Lok Sabha constituency.

== Members of Legislative Assembly ==
Year	Member	Picture	Party
1967	Kewal Ram Chauhan		Independent
1972	Kewal Ram Chauhan		Indian National Congress
1977	Radha Raman Shastri		Janata Party
1982	Kewal Ram Chauhan		Indian National Congress
1985	Yogendra Chandra		Indian National Congress
1990	Radha Raman Shastri		Bharatiya Janata Party
1993	Yogendra Chandra		Independent
1998	Yogendra Chandra		Indian National Congress
2003	Subhash Chand Manglate		Independent
2007	Subhash Chand Manglate		Indian National Congress
2012	Balbir Singh Verma		Independent
2017	Balbir Singh Verma		Bharatiya Janata Party
2022	Balbir Singh Verma		Bharatiya Janata Party

== Election results ==
=== Assembly Election 2022 ===
2022 Himachal Pradesh Legislative Assembly election: Chopal
Party	Candidate	Votes	%	±%
BJP	Balbir Singh Verma	25,873	41.58%	▼10.44
INC	Sh. Rajneesh Kimta	20,840	33.49%	▼10.45
Independent	Dr. Subhash Chand Manglate	13,706	22.03%	New
NOTA	Nota	550	0.88%	▲0.09
Independent	Sh. Ashok Kumar	463	0.74%	New
AAP	Sh. Uday Singhta	413	0.66%	New
BSP	Bhagat Lal	382	0.61%	▼0.26
Margin of victory		5,033	8.09%	▲0.01
Turnout		62,227	76.09%	▼1.54
Registered electors		81,782		▲11.80
BJP hold		Swing	▼10.44	

=== Assembly Election 2017 ===
2017 Himachal Pradesh Legislative Assembly election: Chopal
Party	Candidate	Votes	%	±%
BJP	Balbir Singh Verma	29,537	52.02%	▲42.49
INC	Dr. Subhash Chand Manglate	24,950	43.94%	▲0.98
BSP	Hari Chand	498	0.88%	▼0.61
NOTA	None of the Above	452	0.80%	New
Independent	Hari Singh Panwar	340	0.60%	New
Margin of victory		4,587	8.08%	▲6.78
Turnout		56,783	77.63%	▲1.90
Registered electors		73,147		▲11.15
BJP gain from Independent		Swing	▲7.76	

=== Assembly Election 2012 ===
2012 Himachal Pradesh Legislative Assembly election: Chopal
Party	Candidate	Votes	%	±%
Independent	Balbir Singh Verma	22,056	44.25%	New
INC	Dr. Subhash Chand Manglate	21,409	42.96%	▼9.30
BJP	Seema	4,747	9.52%	▼31.84
BSP	Hari Chand	740	1.48%	▼2.14
AITC	Rajender Singh	465	0.93%	New
LJP	Ramla Devi	304	0.61%	New
Margin of victory		647	1.30%	▼9.59
Turnout		49,839	75.73%	▲3.86
Registered electors		65,811		▲18.92
Independent gain from INC		Swing	▼8.00	

=== Assembly Election 2007 ===
2007 Himachal Pradesh Legislative Assembly election: Chopal
Party	Candidate	Votes	%	±%
INC	Subhash Chand Manglate	20,785	52.26%	▲30.80
BJP	Radha Raman Shastri	16,453	41.37%	▲23.56
BSP	Hari Chand	1,440	3.62%	New
NCP	Anant Ram	547	1.38%	▼0.34
Independent	Dhanvir Singh Thakur	531	1.34%	New
Margin of victory		4,332	10.89%	▲4.27
Turnout		39,773	71.87%	▼6.55
Registered electors		55,342		▲11.70
INC gain from Independent		Swing	▲24.18	

=== Assembly Election 2003 ===
2003 Himachal Pradesh Legislative Assembly election: Chopal
Party	Candidate	Votes	%	±%
Independent	Subhash Chand	10,910	28.08%	New
INC	Yogendra Chandra	8,339	21.46%	▼36.98
BJP	Sanjay Shashtri	6,919	17.81%	▼1.53
Independent	Arun Kumar	6,646	17.11%	New
Independent	Pratap Singh	4,569	11.76%	New
NCP	Anant Ram	666	1.71%	New
SP	Dalbir Singh	534	1.37%	New
LJP	Ramesh Chand	269	0.69%	New
Margin of victory		2,571	6.62%	▼31.08
Turnout		38,852	78.44%	▲6.53
Registered electors		49,546		▲9.72
Independent gain from INC		Swing	▼30.37	

=== Assembly Election 1998 ===
1998 Himachal Pradesh Legislative Assembly election: Chopal
Party	Candidate	Votes	%	±%
INC	Yogendra Chandra	18,972	58.45%	▲35.89
HVC	Kewal Ram Chauhan	6,735	20.75%	New
BJP	Radha Raman Shastri	6,276	19.33%	▲0.90
JD	Mangat Ram Ajata	477	1.47%	▲0.86
Margin of victory		12,237	37.70%	▲1.87
Turnout		32,460	73.10%	▼0.41
Registered electors		45,157		▲13.50
INC gain from Independent		Swing	▲0.06	

=== Assembly Election 1993 ===
1993 Himachal Pradesh Legislative Assembly election: Chopal
Party	Candidate	Votes	%	±%
Independent	Yogendra Chandra	16,796	58.39%	New
INC	Kanwar Uday Singh	6,490	22.56%	▼5.98
BJP	Radha Raman Shastri	5,304	18.44%	▼51.13
JD	Shyam Singh Ghuna	175	0.61%	New
Margin of victory		10,306	35.83%	▼5.19
Turnout		28,765	72.81%	▲4.92
Registered electors		39,787		▲8.90
Independent gain from BJP		Swing	▼11.17	

=== Assembly Election 1990 ===
1990 Himachal Pradesh Legislative Assembly election: Chopal
Party	Candidate	Votes	%	±%
BJP	Radha Raman Shastri	17,124	69.56%	New
INC	Yogendra Chandra	7,027	28.55%	▼42.61
JP	Kripa Ram Thakur Chopali	377	1.53%	New
Margin of victory		10,097	41.02%	▼2.81
Turnout		24,616	67.81%	▼7.00
Registered electors		36,534		▲19.21
BJP gain from INC		Swing		

=== Assembly Election 1985 ===
1985 Himachal Pradesh Legislative Assembly election: Chopal
Party	Candidate	Votes	%	±%
INC	Yogendra Chandra	16,221	71.15%	▲13.23
Independent	Kewal Ram Chauhan	6,229	27.32%	New
Independent	Bhopinder Singh	271	1.19%	New
Margin of victory		9,992	43.83%	▲23.62
Turnout		22,797	75.05%	▲1.71
Registered electors		30,648		▲4.82
INC hold		Swing		

=== Assembly Election 1982 ===
1982 Himachal Pradesh Legislative Assembly election: Chopal
Party	Candidate	Votes	%	±%
INC	Kewal Ram Chauhan	12,307	57.92%	New
BJP	Radha Raman Shastri	8,013	37.71%	New
Independent	Attar Singh Tahkur	598	2.81%	New
LKD	Mangat Ram Ajata	329	1.55%	New
Margin of victory		4,294	20.21%	▼1.83
Turnout		21,247	73.53%	▲15.92
Registered electors		29,238		▲15.98
INC gain from JP		Swing	▲12.73	

=== Assembly Election 1977 ===
1977 Himachal Pradesh Legislative Assembly election: Chopal
Party	Candidate	Votes	%	±%
JP	Radha Raman Shastri	6,466	45.19%	New
Independent	Sant Ram	3,313	23.16%	New
Independent	Mangal Singh	1,901	13.29%	New
Independent	Sabla Ram	1,744	12.19%	New
Independent	Mangat Ram	307	2.15%	New
Independent	Shyam Singh	304	2.12%	New
Independent	Davinder Singh	251	1.75%	New
Margin of victory		3,153	22.04%	▼50.71
Turnout		14,307	57.57%	▲13.35
Registered electors		25,210		▲3.63
JP gain from INC		Swing	▼37.36	

=== Assembly Election 1972 ===
1972 Himachal Pradesh Legislative Assembly election: Chopal
Party	Candidate	Votes	%	±%
INC	Kewal Ram Chauhan	8,717	82.56%	▲34.56
Independent	Shyam Singh	1,035	9.80%	New
Independent	Radha Raman Shastri	807	7.64%	New
Margin of victory		7,682	72.75%	▲68.75
Turnout		10,559	44.24%	▼14.57
Registered electors		24,326		▼16.83
INC gain from Independent		Swing	▲30.55	

=== Assembly Election 1967 ===
1967 Himachal Pradesh Legislative Assembly election: Chopal
Party	Candidate	Votes	%	±%
Independent	K. Ram	8,818	52.00%	New
INC	S. Ram	8,139	48.00%	New
Margin of victory		679	4.00%	
Turnout		16,957	59.66%	
Registered electors		29,250		
Independent gain from INC		Swing		

=== Assembly By-election 1963 ===
1963 Himachal Pradesh Legislative Assembly by-election: Chopal
Party	Candidate	Votes	%	±%
INC	Mohan Lal	Unopposed		
INC win (new seat)				

== See also ==
- Chopal
- Shimla district
- List of constituencies of Himachal Pradesh Legislative Assembly
