= Lajja Ram =

Indian politician

Chaudhary Lajja Ram (1932 or 1933 – 22 November 2015) was an Indian politician and member of the Indian National Congress. Lajja Ram was a member of the Himachal Pradesh Legislative Assembly from the Doon constituency in Solan district.
