= Jeet Ram Katwal =

Indian politician

Member of the Himachal Pradesh Legislative Assembly
- Incumbent
- Assumed office 18 December 2017
- Preceded by: Rikhi Ram Kaundal
- Constituency: Jhanduta

Personal details
- Born: 17 May 1956 (age 70)
- Party: Bharatiya Janata Party
- Spouse: Angmo Katwal
- Children: 1 Son
- Education: Agra University
- Occupation: Politician

Jeet Ram Katwal (born 17 May 1956) is an Indian politician and civil servant. He is member of the Himachal Pradesh Legislative Assembly since 2017 from Jhanduta. He is a member of the Bharatiya Janata Party. He has a background in agriculture, horticulture and social work.

== Early life and education ==
Jeet Ram Katwal is the son of Smt. Sunehru Devi and the late Shri Rohli Ram Katwal. He completed his Master's in Political Science from Agra University, pursued an MBA, earned a Post Graduate Diploma in Journalism and Mass Communication (PGJMC), and obtained certificates in Human Rights (CHR) and Computing (CIC) from IGNOU.

== Personal life ==
Katwal is married to Smt. P. Angmo Katwal, and their family includes two daughters and one son.

== Civil Service Career ==
Jeet Ram Katwal began his career as a Telephone Operator in the P&T Department and later joined the General Insurance Corporation of India as an Assistant Administrative Officer. His journey in the Himachal Pradesh Administrative Service (HAS) commenced in 1986, and he was appointed to the Indian Administrative Service (IAS) in 2001.

As an HAS and IAS officer, Katwal held various positions. He served as SDM in Lahaul-Spiti, Kullu, and Mandi Districts, Additional District Magistrate in Shimla, and Collector of Forest in Kullu. His contributions extended to roles such as Deputy Commissioner in Una and Additional Secretary/Special Secretary in departments like Home, Health, Education, General Administration, and more.

Katwal served as the Head of Departments for Ayurveda, Information & Public Relations, Youth Services & Sports, and several others. His roles as Managing Director included responsibilities at Himachal Pradesh Milk Federation, Himachal Pradesh Backward Classes Finance & Development Corporation, and other key institutions.

== Political career ==
Post-retirement from the Himachal Pradesh government in May 2016, Jeet Ram Katwal joined the Bharatiya Janata Party (BJP) on 14 October 2017.

In the December 2017 elections, Katwal was elected to the State Legislative Assembly. He became a member of various committees such as Human Development, Privileges, Ethics, and Library, Research & Reference Committees. He was re-elected in December 2022.

== Special Interests ==
Jeet Ram Katwal has diverse interests, including trekking, gardening, reading, and a love for old classical music. He is a member of the H.P. Rifle Association and has published a notable case study on sustainable plastic waste management.

== Travels and Languages ==
Katwal's international exposure includes representing India in South Korea as the Chairman of the Indian National Youth Delegation. He also served as the Liaison Officer for the Kailash Manasarovar Yatra in Tibet/China and undertook official visits to Sri Lanka. His language proficiency extends to Hindi, English, and Urdu.

== Electoral performance ==
2022 Himachal Pradesh Legislative Assembly election: Jhanduta
Party	Candidate	Votes	%	±%
BJP	Jeet Ram Katwal	28,268	46.72%	▼6.35
INC	Vivek Kumar	22,469	37.14%	▼6.86
Independent	Raj Kumar Kaundal	8,358	13.81%	New
AAP	Sudhir Kumar Suman	427	0.71%	New
Rashtriya Devbhumi Party	Manoj Kumar	282	0.47%	New
NOTA	Nota	246	0.41%	▼0.73
BSP	Amar Nath	245	0.40%	New
Independent	Jitender Pal	206	0.34%	New
Margin of victory		5,799	9.58%	▲0.51
Turnout		60,501	74.71%	▼0.88
Registered electors		80,977		▲11.92
BJP hold		Swing	▼6.35	

2017 Himachal Pradesh Legislative Assembly election: Jhanduta
Party	Candidate	Votes	%	±%
BJP	Jeet Ram Katwal	29,030	53.07%	▲4.16
INC	Beeru Ram Kishore	24,068	44.00%	▼2.35
NOTA	None of the Above	624	1.14%	New
Margin of victory		4,962	9.07%	▲6.52
Turnout		54,699	75.60%	▲5.78
Registered electors		72,355		▲7.69
BJP hold		Swing		
