= Pachhad Assembly constituency =

Legislative Assembly constituency in Himachal Pradesh State, India

Coordinates: 30.78°N 77.16°E

Pachhad
- Constituency No. 55 for the Himachal Pradesh Legislative Assembly

Constituency details
- Country: India
- Region: North India
- State: Himachal Pradesh
- District: Sirmaur
- Lok Sabha constituency: Shimla
- Established: 1951
- Total electors: 77,181
- Reservation: SC

Member of Legislative Assembly
- 14th Himachal Pradesh Legislative Assembly
- Incumbent Reena Kashyap
- Party: Bharatiya Janata Party
- Elected year: 2022

Pachhad is one of the 68 constituencies in the Himachal Pradesh Legislative Assembly of Himachal Pradesh a northern state of India. It is also part of Shimla Lok Sabha constituency.

== Members of the Legislative Assembly ==
Year	Member	Picture	Party
1951	Yashwant Singh Parmar		Indian National Congress
1967	Jiwnu		Indian National Congress
1972	Zalam Singh		Indian National Congress
1977	Shri Ram Jakhmi		Janata Party
1982	Gangu Ram Musafir		Independent
1985	Gangu Ram Musafir		Indian National Congress
1990	Gangu Ram Musafir		Indian National Congress
1993	Gangu Ram Musafir		Indian National Congress
1998	Gangu Ram Musafir		Indian National Congress
2003	Gangu Ram Musafir		Indian National Congress
2007	Gangu Ram Musafir		Indian National Congress
2012	Suresh Kumar Kashyap		Bharatiya Janata Party
2017	Suresh Kumar Kashyap		Bharatiya Janata Party
2019 by-election	Reena Kashyap		Bharatiya Janata Party
2022	Reena Kashyap		Bharatiya Janata Party

== Election results ==
=== Assembly Election 2022 ===
2022 Himachal Pradesh Legislative Assembly election: Pachhad
Party	Candidate	Votes	%	±%
BJP	Reena Kashyap	21,215	34.52%	▼6.57
INC	Dayal Pyari	17,358	28.25%	▼7.64
Independent	Gangu Ram Musafir	13,187	21.46%	New
Rashtriya Devbhumi Party	Susheel Kumar Bhrigu	8,113	13.20%	New
AAP	Ajay Singh	568	0.92%	New
CPI(M)	Ashish Kumar	543	0.88%	New
NOTA	Nota	466	0.76%	▲0.17
Margin of victory		3,857	6.28%	▲1.07
Turnout		61,450	79.62%	▲7.20
Registered electors		77,181		▲3.62
BJP hold		Swing	▼6.57	

=== Assembly By-election 2019 ===
2019 Himachal Pradesh Legislative Assembly by-election: Pachhad
Party	Candidate	Votes	%	±%
BJP	Reena Kashyap	22,167	41.09%	▼12.33
INC	Gangu Ram Musafir	19,359	35.89%	▼6.18
Independent	Dayal Pyari	11,698	21.69%	New
Independent	Pawan Kumar	428	0.79%	New
NOTA	Nota	318	0.59%	New
Independent	Surender Pal	292	0.54%	New
Margin of victory		2,808	5.21%	▼6.15
Turnout		53,944	72.55%	▼9.49
Registered electors		74,487		▲7.78
BJP hold		Swing	▼12.33	

=== Assembly Election 2017 ===
2017 Himachal Pradesh Legislative Assembly election: Pachhad
Party	Candidate	Votes	%	±%
BJP	Suresh Kumar Kashyap	30,243	53.42%	▲2.61
INC	Gangu Ram Musafir	23,816	42.07%	▼3.51
Independent	Rattan Singh Kashyap	1,182	2.09%	New
NOTA	None of the Above	495	0.87%	New
Margin of victory		6,427	11.35%	▲6.12
Turnout		56,611	81.91%	▲1.90
Registered electors		69,110		▲10.23
BJP hold		Swing	▲2.61	

=== Assembly Election 2012 ===
2012 Himachal Pradesh Legislative Assembly election: Pachhad
Party	Candidate	Votes	%	±%
BJP	Suresh Kumar Kashyap	25,488	50.81%	▲4.90
INC	Gangu Ram Musafir	22,863	45.58%	▼5.82
AITC	Rangi Ram	668	1.33%	New
NCP	Ram Rattan	412	0.82%	New
HLC	Desh Raj	384	0.77%	New
BSP	Shanti Devi	298	0.59%	▼1.91
Margin of victory		2,625	5.23%	▼0.25
Turnout		50,165	80.01%	▼0.31
Registered electors		62,697		▲1.96
BJP gain from INC		Swing	▼0.59	

=== Assembly Election 2007 ===
2007 Himachal Pradesh Legislative Assembly election: Pachhad
Party	Candidate	Votes	%	±%
INC	Gangu Ram Musafir	25,383	51.40%	▲2.08
BJP	Suresh Kumar Kashyap	22,674	45.91%	▼0.48
BSP	Parkash Dutt Bhatia	1,239	2.51%	New
Margin of victory		2,709	5.49%	▲2.56
Turnout		49,388	80.32%	▲0.96
Registered electors		61,491		▲11.03
INC hold		Swing		

=== Assembly Election 2003 ===
2003 Himachal Pradesh Legislative Assembly election: Pachhad
Party	Candidate	Votes	%	±%
INC	Gangu Ram Musafir	21,671	49.31%	▼15.22
BJP	Ram Prakash	20,385	46.39%	▲20.18
Independent	Surinder Singh	1,890	4.30%	New
Margin of victory		1,286	2.93%	▼35.40
Turnout		43,946	79.56%	▲3.54
Registered electors		55,380		▲11.92
INC hold		Swing		

=== Assembly Election 1998 ===
1998 Himachal Pradesh Legislative Assembly election: Pachhad
Party	Candidate	Votes	%	±%
INC	Gangu Ram Musafir	24,208	64.53%	▲7.04
BJP	Kali Dass Kashyap	9,832	26.21%	▼12.02
HVC	Subhash Chand	3,473	9.26%	New
Margin of victory		14,376	38.32%	▲19.06
Turnout		37,513	76.89%	▲0.09
Registered electors		49,481		▲13.24
INC hold		Swing		

=== Assembly Election 1993 ===
1993 Himachal Pradesh Legislative Assembly election: Pachhad
Party	Candidate	Votes	%	±%
INC	Gangu Ram Musafir	19,021	57.49%	▼0.30
BJP	Ram Parkash	12,649	38.23%	▼1.99
CPI	Naresh Kumar	1,322	4.00%	New
Margin of victory		6,372	19.26%	▲1.69
Turnout		33,086	76.45%	▲2.99
Registered electors		43,695		▲8.00
INC hold		Swing		

=== Assembly Election 1990 ===
1990 Himachal Pradesh Legislative Assembly election: Pachhad
Party	Candidate	Votes	%	±%
INC	Gangu Ram Musafir	17,006	57.79%	▼19.01
BJP	Kali Dass Kashyap	11,835	40.22%	▲17.03
Independent	Lekh Ram	584	1.98%	New
Margin of victory		5,171	17.57%	▼36.04
Turnout		29,425	73.22%	▲3.52
Registered electors		40,460		▲22.99
INC hold		Swing		

=== Assembly Election 1985 ===
1985 Himachal Pradesh Legislative Assembly election: Pachhad
Party	Candidate	Votes	%	±%
INC	Gangu Ram	17,485	76.81%	▲52.61
BJP	Shiv Ram	5,280	23.19%	▼1.83
Margin of victory		12,205	53.61%	▲30.93
Turnout		22,765	69.71%	▲3.77
Registered electors		32,896		▲4.74
INC gain from Independent		Swing	▲29.10	

=== Assembly Election 1982 ===
1982 Himachal Pradesh Legislative Assembly election: Pachhad
Party	Candidate	Votes	%	±%
Independent	Gangu Ram	9,805	47.71%	New
BJP	Uchhbu Ram	5,143	25.02%	New
INC	Sada Nand	4,973	24.20%	▲6.59
JP	Arjun Singh	631	3.07%	▼41.00
Margin of victory		4,662	22.68%	▲4.58
Turnout		20,552	66.06%	▲11.62
Registered electors		31,407		▲14.39
Independent gain from JP		Swing	▲3.63	

=== Assembly Election 1977 ===
1977 Himachal Pradesh Legislative Assembly election: Pachhad
Party	Candidate	Votes	%	±%
JP	Shri Ram Jakhmi	6,512	44.07%	New
Independent	Vidya Nand	3,837	25.97%	New
INC	Sada Nand	2,602	17.61%	▼58.04
Independent	Prem Dass	1,824	12.35%	New
Margin of victory		2,675	18.10%	▼36.09
Turnout		14,775	54.49%	▲13.45
Registered electors		27,456		▲4.20
JP gain from INC		Swing	▼31.57	

=== Assembly Election 1972 ===
1972 Himachal Pradesh Legislative Assembly election: Pachhad
Party	Candidate	Votes	%	±%
INC	Zalam Singh	8,046	75.65%	▼4.33
Independent	Uchhbu Ram	2,282	21.46%	New
CPI(M)	Mandu Ram	308	2.90%	New
Margin of victory		5,764	54.19%	▼5.76
Turnout		10,636	41.12%	▲4.41
Registered electors		26,349		▼3.61
INC hold		Swing	▼4.33	

=== Assembly Election 1967 ===
1967 Himachal Pradesh Legislative Assembly election: Pachhad
Party	Candidate	Votes	%	±%
INC	Z. Singh	7,860	79.98%	▲79.12
Independent	M. Ram	1,968	20.02%	New
Margin of victory		5,892	59.95%	▼11.32
Turnout		9,828	37.50%	▼0.60
Registered electors		27,335		▼1.01
INC hold		Swing	▼5.66	

=== Assembly Election 1952 ===
1952 Himachal Pradesh Legislative Assembly election: Pachhad
Party	Candidate	Votes	%	±%
INC	Yashwant Singh Parmar	8,644	85.64%	New
Independent	Kalawati Lall	1,450	14.36%	New
INC	Jiwnu			New
Margin of victory		7,194	71.27%	
Turnout		10,094	36.56%	
Registered electors		27,613		
INC win (new seat)				

== See also ==
- Sirmaur district
- List of constituencies of Himachal Pradesh Legislative Assembly
