= Virender Kashyap =

Indian politician

Member of Parliament, Lok Sabha
- In office 2009–2019
- Preceded by: Dhani Ram Shandil
- Succeeded by: Suresh Kumar Kashyap
- Constituency: Shimla

Personal details
- Born: 5 September 1950 (age 76) Bhalawag, Shimla, Himachal Pradesh
- Party: Bharatiya Janata Party
- Spouse: Smt. Daya Kashyap
- Children: 4
- Education: Himachal Pradesh University
- Occupation: Agriculturist
- As of 15 December, 2016

Virender Kashyap is an Indian politician, belonging to Bharatiya Janata Party. In the 2009 election he was elected to the Lok Sabha from the Shimla constituency in Himachal Pradesh.

He was again elected as an MP from Shimla constituency in Himachal Pradesh in Indian General Election 2014.
