= Pawan Kumar Kajal =

Indian politician

Member of the Himachal Pradesh Legislative Assembly
- Incumbent
- Assumed office 25 December 2012
- Preceded by: Sanjay Chaudhary
- Constituency: Kangra

Personal details
- Born: 6 May 1974 (age 51)
- Party: Bharatiya Janata Party
- Other political affiliations: Indian National Congress, Independent
- Spouse: Mrs. Monica Kajal
- Occupation: Politician

Pawan Kumar Kajal is an Indian politician, and a member of Himachal Pradesh Legislative Assembly. He was the head of Congress Working committee.

== Early life and education ==
Pawan Kumar Kajal, born on 6 May 1974 in Sahoura, Kangra. Pawan Kumar Kajal is the son of Late Shri Amar Singh. He completed his education from Kangra.

== Political career ==
Kajal's political journey began with his active involvement in the Zila Parishad of Kangra, where he served as a Member twice. In the December 2022 elections, Pawan Kumar Kajal won third time.
