= Paonta Sahib Assembly constituency =

Legislative Assembly constituency in Himachal Pradesh State, India

Coordinates: 30°26′N 77°37′E

Paonta Sahib
- Constituency No. 58 for the Himachal Pradesh Legislative Assembly

Constituency details
- Country: India
- Region: North India
- State: Himachal Pradesh
- District: Sirmaur
- Lok Sabha constituency: Shimla
- Established: 2008
- Total electors: 85,540
- Reservation: None

Member of Legislative Assembly
- 14th Himachal Pradesh Legislative Assembly
- Incumbent Sukh Ram Chaudhary
- Party: Bharatiya Janata Party
- Elected year: 2022

Paonta Sahib Assembly constituency is one of the 68 constituencies in the Himachal Pradesh Legislative Assembly of Himachal Pradesh a northern state of India. Paonta Sahib is also part of Shimla Lok Sabha constituency.

== Members of the Legislative Assembly ==
Year	Member	Party
2012	Kirnesh Jung	Independent politician
2017	Sukh Ram Chaudhary	Bharatiya Janata Party
2022	Sukh Ram Chaudhary	Bharatiya Janata Party

== Election results ==
=== Assembly Election 2022 ===
2022 Himachal Pradesh Legislative Assembly election: Paonta Sahib
Party	Candidate	Votes	%	±%
BJP	Sukh Ram Chaudhary	31,008	46.93%	▼11.66
INC	Kirnesh Jung	22,412	33.92%	▼4.14
AAP	Manish Thakur	5,090	7.70%	New
Independent	Manish Tomar	3,417	5.17%	New
Independent	Roshan Lal Chaudhary	1,872	2.83%	New
Independent	Suneel Chaudhary	896	1.36%	New
NOTA	Nota	495	0.75%	▼0.27
Rashtriya Devbhumi Party	Ashwani Verma	367	0.56%	New
Independent	Rameshwar Sharma	315	0.48%	New
BSP	Seema	203	0.31%	New
Margin of victory		8,596	13.01%	▼7.52
Turnout		66,075	77.24%	▼4.37
Registered electors		85,540		▲13.58
BJP hold		Swing	▼11.66	

=== Assembly Election 2017 ===
2017 Himachal Pradesh Legislative Assembly election: Paonta Sahib
Party	Candidate	Votes	%	±%
BJP	Sukh Ram Chaudhary	36,011	58.59%	▲16.02
INC	Kirnesh Jung	23,392	38.06%	▲26.63
NOTA	None of the Above	624	1.02%	New
Lok Gathbandhan Party	Meena Kumari	484	0.79%	New
Independent	Surender	414	0.67%	New
Margin of victory		12,619	20.53%	▲19.06
Turnout		61,467	81.62%	▼0.37
Registered electors		75,310		▲14.67
BJP gain from Independent		Swing	▲14.55	

=== Assembly Election 2012 ===
2012 Himachal Pradesh Legislative Assembly election: Paonta Sahib
Party	Candidate	Votes	%	±%
Independent	Kirnesh Jung	23,713	44.04%	New
BJP	Sukh Ram Chaudhary	22,923	42.57%	New
INC	Onkar Singh	6,152	11.42%	New
Independent	Sarvar Ali	678	1.26%	New
BSP	Budh Ram	378	0.70%	New
Margin of victory		790	1.47%	
Turnout		53,847	81.99%	
Registered electors		65,674		
Independent win (new seat)				

== See also ==
- Paonta Sahib
- Sirmour district
- List of constituencies of Himachal Pradesh Legislative Assembly
