= Sukh Ram Chaudhary =

Indian politician

Member of the Himachal Legislative Assembly
- Constituency: Paonta Sahib Assembly constituency
- Incumbent
- Assumed office 2017
- Preceded by: Kirnesh Jung
- Incumbent
- Assumed office 2022

Personal details
- Born: 15 April 1964 (age 62) Sirmaur, Himachal Pradesh, India
- Party: BJP
- Education: Diploma in electrical
- Occupation: Politician

Sukh Ram Chaudhary is an Indian politician and is the current MLA for the Paonta Sahib in the Himachal Pradesh Legislative Assembly since 2017.

Chaudhary has a diploma in electrical engineering as well as rocket science and was elected to the Himachal Legislative Assembly in 2003, 2007 and 2017. Chaudhary has served as power minister since 2017.
