= Krishan Dutt Sultanpuri =

Indian politician

Member of Parliament, Lok Sabha
- In office 1980-1999
- Preceded by: Balak Ram Kashyap
- Succeeded by: Dhani Ram Shandil
- Constituency: Shimla

Personal details
- Born: 20 April 1932 Solan, Punjab, British India (now in Himachal Pradesh, India)
- Died: 11 June 2006 (aged 74)
- Party: Indian National Congress
- Spouse: Satya Devi
- Children: Two sons and four daughters including Vinod Sultanpuri

Krishan Dutt Sultanpuri was an Indian politician. He was elected to the Lok Sabha, lower house of the Parliament of India from the Shimla constituency of Himachal Pradesh in 1980, 1984, 1989, 1991, 1996 and 1998 as a member of the Indian National Congress. He was a member of the Himachal Pradesh Legislative Assembly from Solan in 1972 as an Independent candidate. Mr. Sultanpuri belong to the Koli caste of Himachal Pradesh and was close aid to former Indian President Ram Nath Kovind.
