= Dhani Ram Shandil =

Indian politician

Dhani Ram Narainuram Shandil Colonel (India)
- धनीराम नरेनूराम सांडील
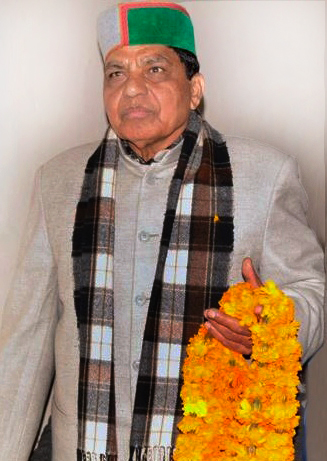
- Col. Dhani Ram Narainuram Shandil

Cabinet Minister, Government of Himachal Pradesh
- Incumbent
- Assumed office 8 January 2023
- Governor: Rajendra Arlekar (2022–2023); Shiv Pratap Shukla (2023–2026); Kavinder Gupta (2026–present)
- Cabinet: Sukhu ministry
- Chief Minister: Sukhvinder Singh Sukhu
- Ministry and Departments: Health and Family Welfare; Social Justice and Empowerment; Labour and Employment

MLA, Himachal Pradesh Legislative Assembly
- Incumbent
- Assumed office 2012
- Preceded by: Rajeev Bindal
- Constituency: Solan

Member of Parliament, Lok Sabha
- In office 6 October 1999 – 16 May 2009
- Preceded by: Krishan Dutt Sultanpuri
- Succeeded by: Virender Kashyap
- Constituency: Shimla

Personal details
- Born: 20 October 1940 (age 85) Shimla, Hill States, British India (Himachal Pradesh)
- Party: Indian National Congress
- Other political affiliations: Himachal Vikas Congress
- Spouse: Indira Dhaniram Shandil (married. 10 May 1966)
- Children: 1 son and 2 daughters
- Parent(s): Shri Narainuramji Shandil (father), Smt. Lakshmidevi Narainuramji Shandil (mother)
- Education: M.A., M. Phil., Ph. D.
- Alma mater: Himachal Pradesh University
- Occupation: Social worker
- Profession: Politician, Agriculturist
- Awards: Bharat Jyoti Award
- Nickname: Colonel Shandil

Military service
- Allegiance: India
- Branch/service: Indian Army
- Years of service: 1962 - 1996
- Rank: Colonel
- Unit: Dogra Regiment
- Commands: Army commands, Shimla
- As of 9 May, 2006

Colonel Dhani Ram Shandil (Retd.) (born 20 October 1940) is an Indian politician from Himachal Pradesh. He is a member of the Indian National Congress political party.

Dhani Ram Shandil has served in elite Dogra Regiment of Indian Army and is a Bharat Jyoti Award winner. Shandil belongs to the Koli caste of Himachal Pradesh.

== Political career ==
In 1999, he was elected to the 13th Lok Sabha from Shimla constituency in Himachal Pradesh as a Himachal Vikas Congress candidate. He was re-elected to the 14th Lok Sabha in 2004 from the same constituency as an Indian National Congress candidate. He is the MLA from Solan and previously served as Social Justice and empowerment minister in the Himachal Pradesh Cabinet.

== Posts held ==
- 1999, Elected to 13th Lok Sabha
- Leader, Himachal Vikas Congress Parliamentary Party, Lok Sabha
- 1999-2000 Member, Committee on Defence
- 2000-2001 Member, Library Committee
- 2000-2004 Member, Consultative Committee, Ministry of Petroleum and Natural Gas
- 2004 Re-elected to 14th Lok Sabha (2nd term)
- Member, Committee on Provision of Computer for MPs, Offices of Parties in Lok Sabha and Officers of Lok Sabha Secretariat
- Member, Committee on External Affairs
- Member, Committee on the Welfare of Scheduled Castes and Scheduled Tribes
- 5 Aug. 2007 onwards, Member, Standing Committee on External Affairs
