= Shimla Lok Sabha constituency =

Lok Sabha constituency in Himachal Pradesh

Coordinates: 31.1°N 77.2°E

Shimla HP-4
- Lok Sabha constituency
- Interactive Map Outlining Shimla Lok Sabha constituency

Constituency details
- Country: India
- Region: North India
- State: Himachal Pradesh
- Assembly constituencies: 17: Arki, Nalagarh, Doon, Solan, Kasauli, Pachhad, Nahan, Sri Renukaji, Paonta Sahib, Shillai, Chopal, Theog, Kasumpti, Shimla, Shimla Rural, Jubbal-Kotkhai, Rohru
- Established: 1962
- Reservation: SC

Member of Parliament
- 18th Lok Sabha
- Incumbent Suresh Kumar Kashyap
- Party: BJP
- Alliance: NDA
- Elected year: 2024

Shimla Lok Sabha constituency (formerly, Simla Lok Sabha constituency) is one of the four Lok Sabha (parliamentary) constituencies in Himachal Pradesh state in northern India. The seat is reserved for the candidates belonging to the Scheduled Castes.

== Assembly segments ==
Shimla vidhan Sabha constituency presently comprises the following 17 Vidhan Sabha (legislative assembly) segments:

No	Name	District	Member	Party	Leading (in 2024)
50	Arki	Solan	Sanjay Awasthy	INC	BJP
51	Nalagarh	Solan	Hardeep Singh Bawa	INC	BJP
52	Doon	Solan	Ram Kumar	INC	BJP
53	Solan (SC)	Solan	Dhani Ram Shandil	INC	BJP
54	Kasauli (SC)	Solan	Vinod Sultanpuri	INC	BJP
55	Pachhad (SC)	Sirmaur	Reena Kashyap	BJP	BJP
56	Nahan	Sirmaur	Ajay Solanki	INC	BJP
57	Sri Renukaji (SC)	Sirmaur	Vinay Kumar	INC	BJP
58	Paonta Sahib	Sirmaur	Sukh Ram Chaudhary	BJP	BJP
59	Shillai	Sirmaur	Harshwardhan Chauhan	INC	BJP
60	Chopal	Shimla	Balbir Singh Verma	BJP	BJP
61	Theog	Shimla	Kuldeep Singh Rathore	INC	BJP
62	Kasumpti	Shimla	Aniruddh Singh	INC	BJP
63	Shimla	Shimla	Harish Janartha	INC	BJP
64	Shimla Rural	Shimla	Vikramaditya Singh	INC	BJP
65	Jubbal-Kotkhai	Shimla	Rohit Thakur	INC	INC
67	Rohru (SC)	Shimla	Mohan Lal Brakta	INC	INC

== Members of Parliament ==
Year	Name	Party
1962	Virbhadra Singh	Indian National Congress
1967	Virbhadra Singh	Indian National Congress
1967^	Pratap Singh	Indian National Congress
1971	Pratap Singh	Indian National Congress
1977	Balak Ram Kashyap	Bharatiya Lok Dal
1980	Krishan Dutt Sultanpuri	Indian National Congress
1984	Krishan Dutt Sultanpuri	Indian National Congress
1989	Krishan Dutt Sultanpuri	Indian National Congress
1991	Krishan Dutt Sultanpuri	Indian National Congress
1996	Krishan Dutt Sultanpuri	Indian National Congress
1998	Krishan Dutt Sultanpuri	Indian National Congress
1999	Dhani Ram Shandil	Himachal Vikas Congress
2004	Dhani Ram Shandil	Indian National Congress
2009	Virender Kashyap	Bharatiya Janata Party
2014	Virender Kashyap	Bharatiya Janata Party
2019	Suresh Kashyap	Bharatiya Janata Party
2024	Suresh Kashyap	Bharatiya Janata Party

^ by poll

== Election results ==
=== 2024 ===
2024 Indian general election: Shimla
Party	Candidate	Votes	%	±%
BJP	Suresh Kumar Kashyap	519,748	53.58	▼12.77
INC	Vinod Sultanpuri	4,28,297	44.16	▲13.66
NOTA	None of the Above	5,930	0.61	
Majority		91,451	9.42	
Turnout		9,71,315	71.70	
BJP hold		Swing		

=== 2019 ===
2019 Indian general elections: Shimla
Party	Candidate	Votes	%	±%
BJP	Suresh Kumar Kashyap	606,183	66.35	▲14.05
INC	Dhani Ram Shandil	2,78,668	30.50	▼10.39
NOTA	None of the Above	8,357	0.91	▼0.15
Majority		3,27,515	35.85	▲24.44
Turnout		9,15,149	72.68	▲8.71
BJP hold		Swing		

=== 2014 ===
2014 Indian general elections: Shimla
Party	Candidate	Votes	%	±%
BJP	Virender Kashyap	385,973	52.30	▲1.88
INC	Mohal Lal Brakta	3,01,786	40.89	▼5.10
AAP	Subhash Chander	14,233	1.93	New
CPI(M)	Jagat Ram	11,434	1.55	
IND.	Virender Kumar Kashyap	6,173	0.84	
none of the above	None of the Above	7,787	1.06	
Majority		84,187	11.41	▲6.98
Turnout		7,37,756	63.97	▲8.24
BJP hold		Swing		

=== 2009 ===
2009 Indian general elections: Shimla
Party	Candidate	Votes	%	±%
BJP	Virender Kashyap	310,946	50.42	▲12.02
INC	Dhani Ram Shandil	2,83,619	45.99	▲6.05
BSP	Somnath	8,160	1.32	▼20.33
Majority		27,327	4.43	▲2.89
Turnout		6,16,684	55.73	▲3.84
BJP gain from INC		Swing	▲5.59	

=== 2004 ===
2004 Indian general elections: Simla
Party	Candidate	Votes	%	±%
INC	Dhani Ram Shandil	211,182	39.94	
BJP	Hira Nand Kashyap	2,03,002	38.40	
BSP	Som Nath	1,14,471	21.65	
Majority		8,180	1.54	
Turnout		528,655	51.89	
INC gain from HVC		Swing		

== See also ==
- Shimla district
- List of constituencies of the Lok Sabha
