= Mahender Nath Sofat =

Indian politician

Mahender Nath Sofat is an Indian politician and member of the Bharatiya Janata Party. Sofat was a member of the Himachal Pradesh Legislative Assembly from the Solan constituency in Solan district.
