= Balbir Singh Verma =

Indian politician

Member of the Himachal Pradesh Legislative Assembly
- Incumbent
- Assumed office 25 December 2012
- Preceded by: Subhash Chand Manglate
- Constituency: Chopal

Personal details
- Born: 4 April 1971 (age 55) Katiyana, Chopal, Himachal Pradesh
- Party: Bharatiya Janata Party
- Spouse: Meena Devi Verma
- Children: 1 Son
- Parent: Dharam Das Verma (father)

Military service
- Allegiance: India
- Branch/service: Border Security Force
- Years of service: 2006–2012

Balbir Singh Verma (born 4 April), is an Indian politician, who currently serves as Member of Legislative Assembly from Chopal constituency. Balbir Singh Verma won from Chopal constituency in 2017 Himachal Pradesh Legislative Assembly election.

== Electoral performance ==
2022 Himachal Pradesh Legislative Assembly election: Chopal
| Party | Candidate | Votes | % | ±% |
|---|---|---|---|---|
| BJP | Balbir Singh Verma | 25,873 | 41.58% | ▼10.44 |
| INC | Sh. Rajneesh Kimta | 20,840 | 33.49% | ▼10.45 |
| Independent | Dr. Subhash Chand Manglate | 13,706 | 22.03% | New |
| NOTA | Nota | 550 | 0.88% | ▲0.09 |
| Independent | Sh. Ashok Kumar | 463 | 0.74% | New |
| AAP | Sh. Uday Singhta | 413 | 0.66% | New |
| BSP | Bhagat Lal | 382 | 0.61% | ▼0.26 |
| Margin of victory | | 5,033 | 8.09% | ▲0.01 |
| Turnout | | 62,227 | 76.09% | ▼1.54 |
| Registered electors | | 81,782 | | ▲11.80 |
| BJP hold | | Swing | ▼10.44 | |

2017 Himachal Pradesh Legislative Assembly election: Chopal
| Party | Candidate | Votes | % | ±% |
|---|---|---|---|---|
| BJP | Balbir Singh Verma | 29,537 | 52.02% | ▲42.49 |
| INC | Dr. Subhash Chand Manglate | 24,950 | 43.94% | ▲0.98 |
| BSP | Hari Chand | 498 | 0.88% | ▼0.61 |
| NOTA | None of the Above | 452 | 0.80% | New |
| Independent | Hari Singh Panwar | 340 | 0.60% | New |
| Margin of victory | | 4,587 | 8.08% | ▲6.78 |
| Turnout | | 56,783 | 77.63% | ▲1.90 |
| Registered electors | | 73,147 | | ▲11.15 |
| BJP gain from Independent | | Swing | ▲7.76 | |

2012 Himachal Pradesh Legislative Assembly election: Chopal
| Party | Candidate | Votes | % | ±% |
|---|---|---|---|---|
| Independent | Balbir Singh Verma | 22,056 | 44.25% | New |
| INC | Dr. Subhash Chand Manglate | 21,409 | 42.96% | ▼9.30 |
| BJP | Seema | 4,747 | 9.52% | ▼31.84 |
| BSP | Hari Chand | 740 | 1.48% | ▼2.14 |
| AITC | Rajender Singh | 465 | 0.93% | New |
| LJP | Ramla Devi | 304 | 0.61% | New |
| Margin of victory | | 647 | 1.30% | ▼9.59 |
| Turnout | | 49,839 | 75.73% | ▲3.86 |
| Registered electors | | 65,811 | | ▲18.92 |
| Independent gain from INC | | Swing | ▼8.00 | |
