= All India Tribes and Minorities Front =

- Leader: Mangal Singh Negi
- Headquarters: Windrush Hill Annexe, Shimla-2

All India Tribes and Minorities Front is a political party in the Indian state of Himachal Pradesh. The party works for the issues affecting the adivasi population. The party president was social activist Mangal Singh Negi, who died in 2017 aged 86.

AITMF advocates United Nations involvement as mediators in the Kashmir issue. The party also advocates a trifurcation of the state of Jammu and Kashmir in Kashmir, Jammu and Ladakh.
