= Radha Raman Shastri =

Indian politician

Dr Radha Raman Shastri is a former Speaker of the Legislative Assembly of Himachal Pradesh and Education Minister of Himachal Pradesh.

Shastri was born on 23 March 1943 at village Sunog in Tehsil Chopal in the Shimla district of Himachal Pradesh. He started his career as Sanskrit teacher in Himachal Pradesh Education Department, served only for 8 years and was selected as lecturer for College Cadre but resigned to participate in social and political activities.

He established two periodicals namely " HIMBALA " monthly and " HIMYUVAK " weekly and edited successfully for 9 years. Digvijay Printing Press owned by him was raided during emergency by police 9 times and both the periodicals had to be stopped as these were being printed in his own Press.

During emergency in 1975, he was arrested under Maintenance of Indian Security Act (MISA) and remained in Central Jail Nahan with other most senior leaders for 19 months.

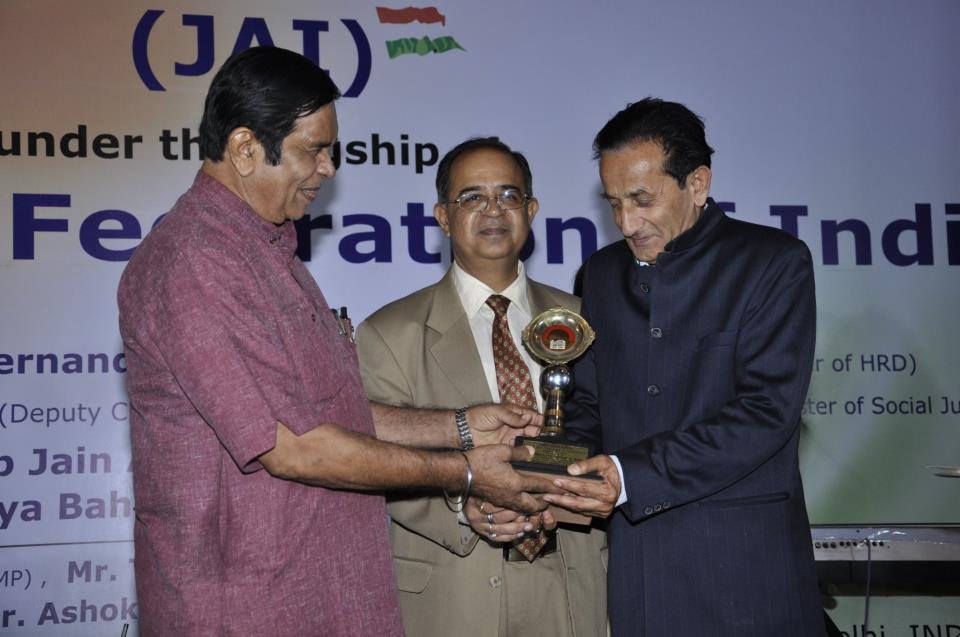
Award for social service

He was elected to Himachal Pradesh state assembly in 1977 immediately after the release from jail, and was made chairman of Himachal Pradesh State Tourism Development Corporation, where he envisaged Master Plan to boost the tourism in the State. He was also president of Janta Party District Shimla immediately after its formation.

He remained as General Secretary of Bhartiya Janta Party, Himachal Pradesh continuously for 10 years w.e.f. 6 April 1980 to March 1990, and founded Snatan Dharm Degree College in the interiors of District Shimla at Nerwa (Chopal), which has been serving the people of this area by uplifting students educationally from weaker sections of different societies.

Again he was elected as a member of State Legislative Assembly in 1990 and was elected Speaker of HP State Assembly. After this he was given an opportunity of becoming Education Minister of Himachal Pradesh with 6 portfolios. He had the chance to visit many countries in the world and got opportunities to deliver lectures on different topics of Social, Educational and Political concerns. He participated in international seminars also.

He wrote two reference books namely " MAHASU KSHETRA KI LOK PARAMPRAYAIN " and " SITUATIONAL STUDY OF TRIBAL AREAS OF HIMACHAL PRADESH ". Now both the reference books are property of Government of India.

== Electoral performance ==
1990 Himachal Pradesh Legislative Assembly election: Chopal
Party	Candidate	Votes	%	±%
BJP	Radha Raman Shastri	17,124	69.56%	New
INC	Yogendra Chandra	7,027	28.55%	▼42.61
JP	Kripa Ram Thakur Chopali	377	1.53%	New
Margin of victory		10,097	41.02%	▼2.81
Turnout		24,616	67.81%	▼7.00
Registered electors		36,534		▲19.21
BJP gain from INC		Swing		

1977 Himachal Pradesh Legislative Assembly election: Chopal
Party	Candidate	Votes	%	±%
JP	Radha Raman Shastri	6,466	45.19%	New
Independent	Sant Ram	3,313	23.16%	New
Independent	Mangal Singh	1,901	13.29%	New
Independent	Sabla Ram	1,744	12.19%	New
Independent	Mangat Ram	307	2.15%	New
Independent	Shyam Singh	304	2.12%	New
Independent	Davinder Singh	251	1.75%	New
Margin of victory		3,153	22.04%	▼50.71
Turnout		14,307	57.57%	▲13.35
Registered electors		25,210		▲3.63
JP gain from INC		Swing	▼37.36	

1972 Himachal Pradesh Legislative Assembly election: Chopal
Party	Candidate	Votes	%	±%
INC	Kewal Ram Chauhan	8,717	82.56%	▲34.56
Independent	Shyam Singh	1,035	9.80%	New
Independent	Radha Raman Shastri	807	7.64%	New
Margin of victory		7,682	72.75%	▲68.75
Turnout		10,559	44.24%	▼14.57
Registered electors		24,326		▼16.83
INC gain from Independent		Swing	▲30.55	

List of speakers of the Himachal Pradesh Legislative Assembly
