= Kangra Assembly constituency =

Legislative Assembly constituency in Himachal Pradesh State, India

Coordinates: 32.11°N 76.27°E

Kangra
- Constituency No. 16 for the Himachal Pradesh Legislative Assembly

Constituency details
- Country: India
- Region: North India
- State: Himachal Pradesh
- District: Kangra
- Lok Sabha constituency: Kangra
- Established: 1967
- Total electors: 83,547
- Reservation: None

Member of Legislative Assembly
- 14th Himachal Pradesh Legislative Assembly
- Incumbent Pawan Kumar Kajal
- Party: Bhartiya Janata Party
- Elected year: 2022

Kangra Assembly constituency is 16th of the 68 assembly constituencies of Himachal Pradesh an Indian state. Kangra is also part of Kangra Lok Sabha constituency.

== Members of Legislative Assembly ==
Year	Member	Picture	Party
1967	Hari Ram		Indian National Congress
1972	Hari Ram		Indian National Congress
1977	Pratap Chaudhary		Janata Party
1982	Vidya Sagar Chaudhary		Bharatiya Janata Party
1985	Vidya Sagar Chaudhary		Bharatiya Janata Party
1990	Vidya Sagar Chaudhary		Bharatiya Janata Party
1993	Daulat Ram		Bharatiya Janata Party
1998	Vidya Sagar Chaudhary		Bharatiya Janata Party
2003	Surinder Kumar		Indian National Congress
2007	Sanjay Chaudhary		Bahujan Samaj Party
2012	Pawan Kumar Kajal		Independent
2017	Pawan Kumar Kajal		Indian National Congress
2022	Pawan Kumar Kajal		Bharatiya Janata Party

== Election results ==
=== Assembly Election 2022 ===
2022 Himachal Pradesh Legislative Assembly election: Kangra
Party	Candidate	Votes	%	±%
BJP	Pawan Kumar Kajal	35,239	55.64%	▲23.00
INC	Choudhary Surinder Kaku	15,405	24.32%	▼18.79
Independent	Kulbhash Chand	7,994	12.62%	New
Independent	Amit Verma	3,033	4.79%	New
AAP	Raj Kumar	866	1.37%	New
NOTA	Nota	464	0.73%	▼0.37
BSP	Vijay Kumar	338	0.53%	New
Margin of victory		19,834	31.31%	▲20.84
Turnout		63,339	75.81%	▼2.28
Registered electors		83,547		▲10.08
BJP gain from INC		Swing	▲12.53	

=== Assembly Election 2017 ===
2017 Himachal Pradesh Legislative Assembly election: Kangra
Party	Candidate	Votes	%	±%
INC	Pawan Kumar Kajal	25,549	43.11%	▲15.27
BJP	Sanjay Chaudhary	19,341	32.63%	▲9.48
Independent	Dr. Rajesh Sharma	11,805	19.92%	New
NOTA	None of the Above	656	1.11%	New
Lok Gathbandhan Party	Col. Kuldip Singh	482	0.81%	New
NCP	Ravi Chand	408	0.69%	New
Margin of victory		6,208	10.47%	▲9.36
Turnout		59,269	78.09%	▲4.03
Registered electors		75,899		▲11.22
INC gain from Independent		Swing	▲14.15	

=== Assembly Election 2012 ===
2012 Himachal Pradesh Legislative Assembly election: Kangra
Party	Candidate	Votes	%	±%
Independent	Pawan Kumar Kajal	14,632	28.95%	New
INC	Choudhary Surender Kumar	14,069	27.84%	▼4.91
BJP	Sanjay Chaudhary	11,700	23.15%	▼3.98
Independent	Dr. Rajesh Sharma	7,966	15.76%	New
CPI	Aman Guleria	636	1.26%	▼0.26
Himachal Swabhiman Party	Ram Swaroop Verma	521	1.03%	New
BSP	Vijay Kumar Bhari	517	1.02%	▼34.14
SP	Ram Niwash Yadav	416	0.82%	New
Margin of victory		563	1.11%	▼1.31
Turnout		50,539	74.06%	▲3.34
Registered electors		68,243		▼10.76
Independent gain from BSP		Swing	▼6.21	

=== Assembly Election 2007 ===
2007 Himachal Pradesh Legislative Assembly election: Kangra
Party	Candidate	Votes	%	±%
BSP	Sanjay Chaudhary	19,017	35.16%	New
INC	Chaudhary Surender Kaku	17,708	32.74%	▼6.16
BJP	Chaudhary Vidya Sagar	14,673	27.13%	▼1.38
CPI	Aman Guleria	819	1.51%	▼1.62
LJP	Chaudhary Devi Lal	742	1.37%	▲0.38
Independent	Chaudhary Banarsi Dass	558	1.03%	New
ABHM	Amar Singh	505	0.93%	▼0.07
Margin of victory		1,309	2.42%	▼7.97
Turnout		54,080	70.72%	▼1.12
Registered electors		76,470		▲13.47
BSP gain from INC		Swing	▼3.74	

=== Assembly Election 2003 ===
2003 Himachal Pradesh Legislative Assembly election: Kangra
Party	Candidate	Votes	%	±%
INC	Surinder Kumar	18,836	38.90%	▲3.55
BJP	Rattan Lal Jagtamba	13,803	28.51%	▼24.45
Independent	Chaudhary Vidya Sagar	9,882	20.41%	New
HVC	Daulat Ram	3,118	6.44%	▼3.01
CPI	Himal Chand	1,517	3.13%	▲1.64
ABHM	Deepak Kumar	488	1.01%	New
LJP	Dharmender Kumar	478	0.99%	New
NCP	Pushpa Devi	297	0.61%	New
Margin of victory		5,033	10.39%	▼7.21
Turnout		48,419	71.87%	▲1.69
Registered electors		67,394		▲15.41
INC gain from BJP		Swing	▼14.05	

=== Assembly Election 1998 ===
1998 Himachal Pradesh Legislative Assembly election: Kangra
Party	Candidate	Votes	%	±%
BJP	Vidya Sagar Chaudhary	21,695	52.96%	▲15.02
INC	Daulat Chaudhary	14,484	35.35%	▼19.29
HVC	Hari Krishan Chand	3,870	9.45%	New
CPI	Saroj Kumari	612	1.49%	New
Margin of victory		7,211	17.60%	▲0.89
Turnout		40,968	71.43%	▼2.11
Registered electors		58,397		▲11.63
BJP gain from INC		Swing	▼1.69	

=== Assembly Election 1993 ===
1993 Himachal Pradesh Legislative Assembly election: Kangra
Party	Candidate	Votes	%	±%
INC	Daulat Ram	20,658	54.65%	▲31.04
BJP	Vidya Sagar Chaudhary	14,342	37.94%	▼35.96
Independent	Pushpa Choudhary	1,503	3.98%	New
BSP	Girdhari Lal	356	0.94%	▲0.22
JD	Partap Choudhary	348	0.92%	New
	Choudhary Ram	291	0.77%	New
Independent	Parkash Chand	217	0.57%	New
Margin of victory		6,316	16.71%	▼33.59
Turnout		37,803	72.90%	▲2.72
Registered electors		52,314		▲8.72
INC gain from BJP		Swing	▼19.26	

=== Assembly Election 1990 ===
1990 Himachal Pradesh Legislative Assembly election: Kangra
Party	Candidate	Votes	%	±%
BJP	Vidya Sagar Chaudhary	24,729	73.90%	▲21.49
INC	Hari Krishan Chand	7,899	23.61%	▼18.50
BSP	Virender Kumar	241	0.72%	New
Independent	Madan Lal	235	0.70%	New
Doordarshi Party	Diwan Chand	195	0.58%	New
Margin of victory		16,830	50.30%	▲39.99
Turnout		33,462	70.01%	▼0.81
Registered electors		48,119		▲31.98
BJP hold		Swing	▲21.49	

=== Assembly Election 1985 ===
1985 Himachal Pradesh Legislative Assembly election: Kangra
Party	Candidate	Votes	%	±%
BJP	Vidya Sagar Chaudhary	13,443	52.41%	▼8.65
INC	Pushpa Chaudhary	10,800	42.11%	▲12.22
CPI	Himal Chand	1,004	3.91%	▼1.29
Independent	Swami Shanta Nand	214	0.83%	New
Margin of victory		2,643	10.30%	▼20.87
Turnout		25,650	70.96%	▼2.77
Registered electors		36,460		▲7.82
BJP hold		Swing	▼8.65	

=== Assembly Election 1982 ===
1982 Himachal Pradesh Legislative Assembly election: Kangra
Party	Candidate	Votes	%	±%
BJP	Vidya Sagar Chaudhary	15,097	61.06%	New
INC	Surendar Paul	7,388	29.88%	▼6.68
CPI	Himal Chand	1,287	5.21%	New
Independent	Th. Bhim Sain	285	1.15%	New
Independent	Jamna Dass	200	0.81%	New
Independent	Ram Saran	181	0.73%	New
JP	Mohinder Chand Choudhary	145	0.59%	▼46.13
Margin of victory		7,709	31.18%	▲21.02
Turnout		24,725	74.44%	▲12.10
Registered electors		33,816		▲10.31
BJP gain from JP		Swing	▲14.34	

=== Assembly Election 1977 ===
1977 Himachal Pradesh Legislative Assembly election: Kangra
Party	Candidate	Votes	%	±%
JP	Partap Choudhary	8,739	46.72%	New
INC	Surinder Paul	6,839	36.56%	▼12.90
Independent	Jagdish Chand Patarwal	1,797	9.61%	New
Independent	Jaishi Ram	674	3.60%	New
Independent	Chander Mani	360	1.92%	New
Independent	Bhim Sen	199	1.06%	New
Independent	Sita Ram	97	0.52%	New
Margin of victory		1,900	10.16%	▲1.30
Turnout		18,705	62.21%	▲17.37
Registered electors		30,655		▲21.87
JP gain from INC		Swing	▼2.74	

=== Assembly Election 1972 ===
1972 Himachal Pradesh Legislative Assembly election: Kangra
Party	Candidate	Votes	%	±%
INC	Hari Ram	5,430	49.46%	▼15.19
Independent	Jagdish Chand	4,457	40.60%	New
ABJS	Chandu Lal	1,092	9.95%	▼6.38
Margin of victory		973	8.86%	▼39.46
Turnout		10,979	45.17%	▼11.26
Registered electors		25,153		▲17.44
INC hold		Swing	▼15.19	

=== Assembly Election 1967 ===
1967 Himachal Pradesh Legislative Assembly election: Kangra
Party	Candidate	Votes	%	±%
INC	Hari Ram	7,603	64.65%	New
ABJS	J. Nath	1,920	16.33%	New
CPI	T. Ram	1,824	15.51%	New
Independent	S. Chand	413	3.51%	New
Margin of victory		5,683	48.32%	
Turnout		11,760	58.77%	
Registered electors		21,417		
INC win (new seat)				

== See also ==
- List of constituencies of the Himachal Pradesh Legislative Assembly
- Kangra, Himachal Pradesh
- Kangra district
