= Reena Kashyap =

Indian politician

Member of the Himachal Pradesh Legislative Assembly
- Incumbent
- Assumed office 3 November 2019
- Preceded by: Suresh Kumar Kashyap
- Constituency: Pachhad

Personal details
- Born: 16 September 1985 (age 41)
- Party: Bharatiya Janata Party
- Spouse: Kuldeep Kashyap
- Children: 2
- Education: Himachal Pradesh University (MPA)
- Occupation: Politician

Reena Kashyap (born 16 September 1985) is an Indian politician. She was elected to the Himachal Pradesh Legislative Assembly from Pachhad in the 2019 by election as a member of the Bharatiya Janata Party. By-elections happened due to Suresh Kumar Kashyap elected to Parliament.

== Early life and education ==
Reena Kashyap's educational journey includes a Master's degree in Public Administration from H.P. University, Shimla. Her academic pursuits laid the groundwork for a career dedicated to the welfare of society.Reena Kashyap, born on 16 September 1985 in a Agriculturist Koli family, is a dedicated social worker and agriculturist, known for her commitment to public service. She is the daughter of Smt. Bimla Azad and the late Shri Munna Lal. Reena holds a Master's degree in Public Administration from Himachal Pradesh University, Shimla, and is married to Shri Kuldeep Kashyap.

== Family and personal life ==
Born into the family of Smt. Bimla Azad and Late Shri Munna Lal.

== Public Service and Political Career ==
Reena Kashyap's career began with her involvement as a Member of Zila Parishad from 2010 to 2015.

In October 2019, Reena Kashyap was elected to the State Legislative Assembly in a By-Election. Her subsequent contributions as a legislator include membership in key committees such as the Welfare Committee (November 2020 – 2022), Human Development Committee (2021-2022), and Rural Planning Committee (2022).
