= Rikhi Ram Kaundal =

Indian politician

Rikhi Ram Kaundal is a leader of Bharatiya Janata Party from Himachal Pradesh. He is a member of the Himachal Pradesh Legislative Assembly. Kaundal twice served as deputy speaker of the assembly during 1990-92 and 2009-12 .

== Electoral performance ==
2012 Himachal Pradesh Legislative Assembly election: Jhanduta
Party	Candidate	Votes	%	±%
BJP	Rikhi Ram Kaundal	22,941	48.91%	New
INC	Dr. Beeru Ram Kishore	21,742	46.35%	New
HLC	Kashmir Singh Jamwal	791	1.69%	New
Independent	Vijay Kumar Kaushal	764	1.63%	New
BSP	Anup Chand Bhatia	590	1.26%	New
Margin of victory		1,199	2.56%	
Turnout		46,906	69.82%	
Registered electors		67,186		
BJP win (new seat)				
