= Paramjeet Singh =

Indian politician

Paramjeet Singh Pammi is an Indian politician from the Bharatiya Janata Party and a member of the Himachal Pradesh Legislative Assembly representing the Doon assembly constituency of Himachal Pradesh.
