= Kirnesh Jung =

Indian politician

- Born: 1957 (age 68–69)

Kirnesh Jung (born 1957) was the independent MLA representing Paonta Sahib in the twelfth legislative assembly of Himachal Pradesh.
