= Sanjay Chaudhary =

Indian politician

Sanjay Chaudhary is an Indian politician and member of the Bharatiya Janata Party. Chaudhary was a member of the Himachal Pradesh Legislative Assembly from the Kangra constituency in 2007 on Bahujan Samaj Party's ticket.

He is the son of Roshan Lal.
