= Rajeev Bindal =

Indian politician

President of Bharatiya Janata Party, Himachal Pradesh
- Incumbent
- Assumed office 23 April 2023
- National President: JP Nadda; Nitin Nabin
- Preceded by: Suresh Kumar Kashyap
- In office 18 January 2020 – 22 July 2020
- National President: JP Nadda
- Preceded by: Satpal Singh Satti
- Succeeded by: Suresh Kumar Kashyap

Member of the Himachal Pradesh Legislative Assembly
- In office 25 December 2012 – 8 December 2022
- Preceded by: Kush Parmar
- Succeeded by: Ajay Solanki
- Constituency: Nahan

Personal details
- Born: 12 January 1955 (age 71) Solan, Himachal Pradesh, India
- Party: Bharatiya Janata Party
- Parent: Vaid Balmukund Bindal (father)

Rajeev Bindal is the president of Himachal Pradesh BJP. He is a member of the Himachal Pradesh Legislative Assembly and has been the speaker of the Himachal Pradesh Vidhan Sabha from 2018 to 2020. He is a member of the Bharatiya Janata Party. Bindal was the Minister of Health and Family Welfare in Government of Himachal Pradesh, India.

Bindal is the son of Vaid Balmukund Bindal and was born in Solan. He has been a five term MLA, the last two times representing Nahan. He represented the Solan constituency in Vidhan Sabha three times consecutively from 2000 to 2012. He was Cabinet Minister for Health and Family Welfare in the Himachal Pradesh Government from 2007 to 2012. He was unanimously elected Speaker of Himachal Pradesh Legislative Assembly on January 10, 2018, at the inaugural session of 13th Vidhan Sabha in Dharamshala, Himachal Pradesh.

He is a doctor by profession. Bindal started social service during his college days. After graduation, he went to tribal areas of Bihar to serve as a doctor for three years. He established Himgiri Kalyan Ashram at Solan, a charitable institution where poor children are provided boarding and education free of cost.

Bindal has held the office of Chairperson of the Municipal Committee of Solan from 1995 to 2000. He was elected MLA in 2000 and became Chairman of the HP State Pollution Control Board. He was re-elected as MLA in 2003 and 2007 from Solan. He joined the state cabinet as Minister for Health & Family Welfare from 2007 to 2012. After the Solan constituency was reserved, he contested elections from Nahan in Sirmaur district and was elected twice consecutively. He became the Speaker of Himachal Pradesh legislative assembly, and occupied the constitutional post on January 10, 2018. He was also the Health Minister from 2017 to 2019.

He spent two years as Speaker, and then moved to party organisation by becoming the state president of BJP in January 2020.

He was again appointed President of Himachal Pradesh BJP in April 2023.

Rajeev Bindal was appointed president of Himachal Pradesh Bharatiya Janata Party (BJP) on 23 April 2023.
