= Suresh Kumar Kashyap =

Indian politician

- सुरेश कुमार कश्यप
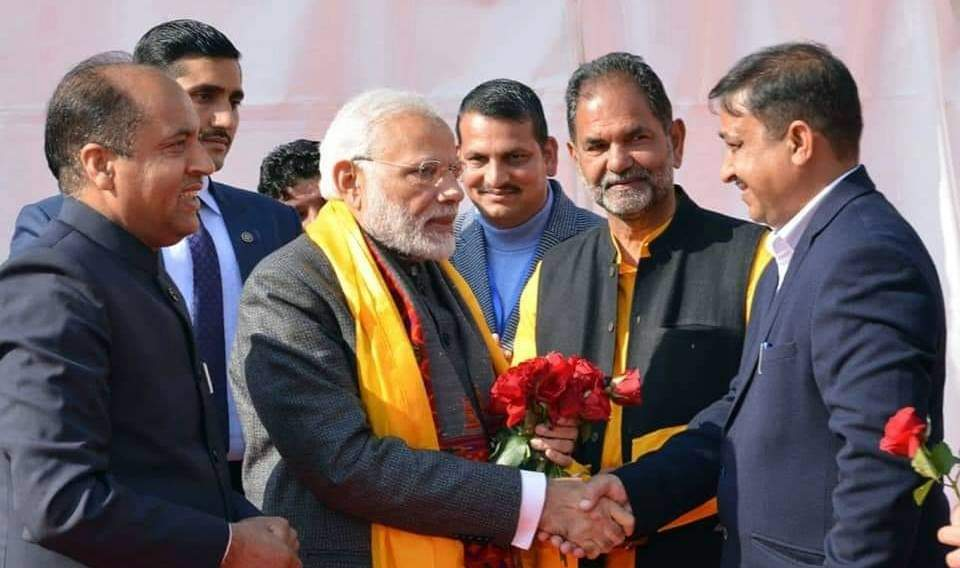
- Suresh Kumar Kashyap with Pm Narendra Modi in Shimla

President of Bharatiya Janata Party, Himachal Pradesh
- In office 22 July 2020 – 23 April 2023
- National President: JP Nadda
- Preceded by: Rajeev Bindal
- Succeeded by: Rajeev Bindal

Member of Parliament, Lok Sabha
- Incumbent
- Assumed office 23 May 2019
- Preceded by: Virender Kashyap
- Constituency: Shimla

Personal details
- Born: 23 March 1971 (age 55) Paplahan, Himachal Pradesh, India
- Party: Bharatiya Janata Party
- Spouse: Rajni Suresh Kashyap (m.1997)
- Children: 1 son
- Parent(s): Shri Chambel Singhji Kashyap (father), Smt. Shanti Devi Kashyap (mother)
- Education: Delhi University (BA); Bharatiya Vidya Bhawan (PG Diploma); Kurukshetra University (MA); Maharshi Dayanand Saraswati University (MA); IGNOU (MA); Jammu University (BEd); Himachal Pradesh University (MPhil)
- Occupation: Politician
- Profession: Agriculturist

Military service
- Allegiance: India
- Branch/service: Indian Air Force
- Years of service: 1988 - 2004
- Rank: Non-commissioned officer
- Unit: Air Force

Suresh Kumar Kashyap is an Indian politician and president of Himachal Pradesh State Unit of Bharatiya Janata Party.

== Early life ==
Kashyap was born in a Koli family to Chambel Singh Kashyap and Shanti Devi at Sirmour, Himachal Pradesh.

His educational background comprises a B.A. from Delhi University in 1993, followed by a PG Diploma in Public Relations and Communication Management from Bharatiya Vidya Bhawan in 1995. Subsequently, he pursued an M.A. in English from Kurukshetra University in 1996 and an M.A. in Public Administration from MDS University Ajmer, which he completed in 2000. Continuing his education, he got an M.A. in Tourism Management from IGNOU in 2004 and a BEd from Jammu University in 2005. Lastly, he got an M Phil in Public Administration from HP University in Shimla in 2008.

In 1988, he joined Indian Air Force as airman (non-commissioned officer) and retired in 2004.

== Political career ==
He started his career as member of BDC (Pachhad) joined BJP and later became Distt. President of BJP Scheduled Caste Morcha. In 2009 he was State General Secretary of BJP Scheduled Caste Morcha.

He became Member of Himachal Pradesh Legislative Assembly from Pachhad constituency in 2012 and got re-elected in 2017 from same constituency.

In 2019 Lok Sabha elections he became Member of Parliament from Shimla constituency. He served as member of parliamentary committees in the following

- Standing Committee on Personnel, Public Grievances, Law and Justice.
- Committee on Absence of Members from the Sittings of the House.
- Committee on External Affairs.
- Consultative Committee for Ministry of Food Processing Industries.

On 22 July 2020 he became the president of Himachal Pradesh State Unit of Bharatiya Janata Party.

He was re-elected in 2024.
