= Himachal Lokhit Party =

- Chairman: Maheshwar Singh
- Founded: 2012
- Dissolved: 2016
- Headquarters: Kullu

Himachal Lokhit Party was a political party in the Indian state of Himachal Pradesh. The party was founded by few of rebel Bharatiya Janata Party leader ahead of 2012 Himachal Pradesh Legislative Assembly election. Maheshwar Singh was named as president of the party and some Senior leaders of BJP like Mahender Nath Sofat, Shyama Sharma also joined the party.

The party took part 2012 Himachal Pradesh Legislative Assembly election and fielded 33 candidates mostly Bharatiya Janata Party and Indian National Congress rebels. Only Maheshwar Singh was elected, together they mustered to get 65,165 votes (1.9% of the votes in the state).

In August 2016, half of the party was merge into Bharatiya Janata Party and in October 2016, rest of its member joined Aam Aadmi Party.
