= 2007 Himachal Pradesh Legislative Assembly election =

State assembly election in India

- 14 November and 19 December 2007

68 seats in the Himachal Pradesh Legislative Assembly 35 seats needed for a majority
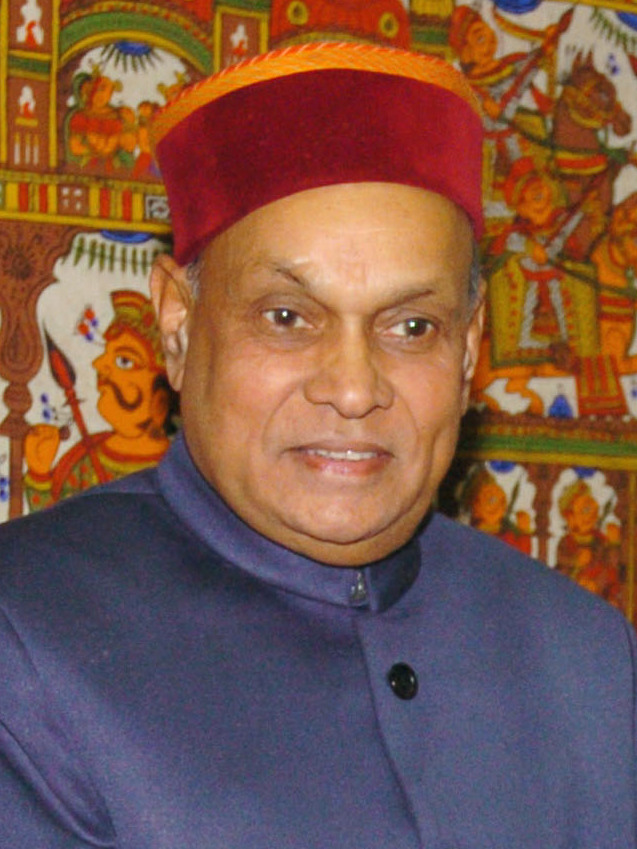

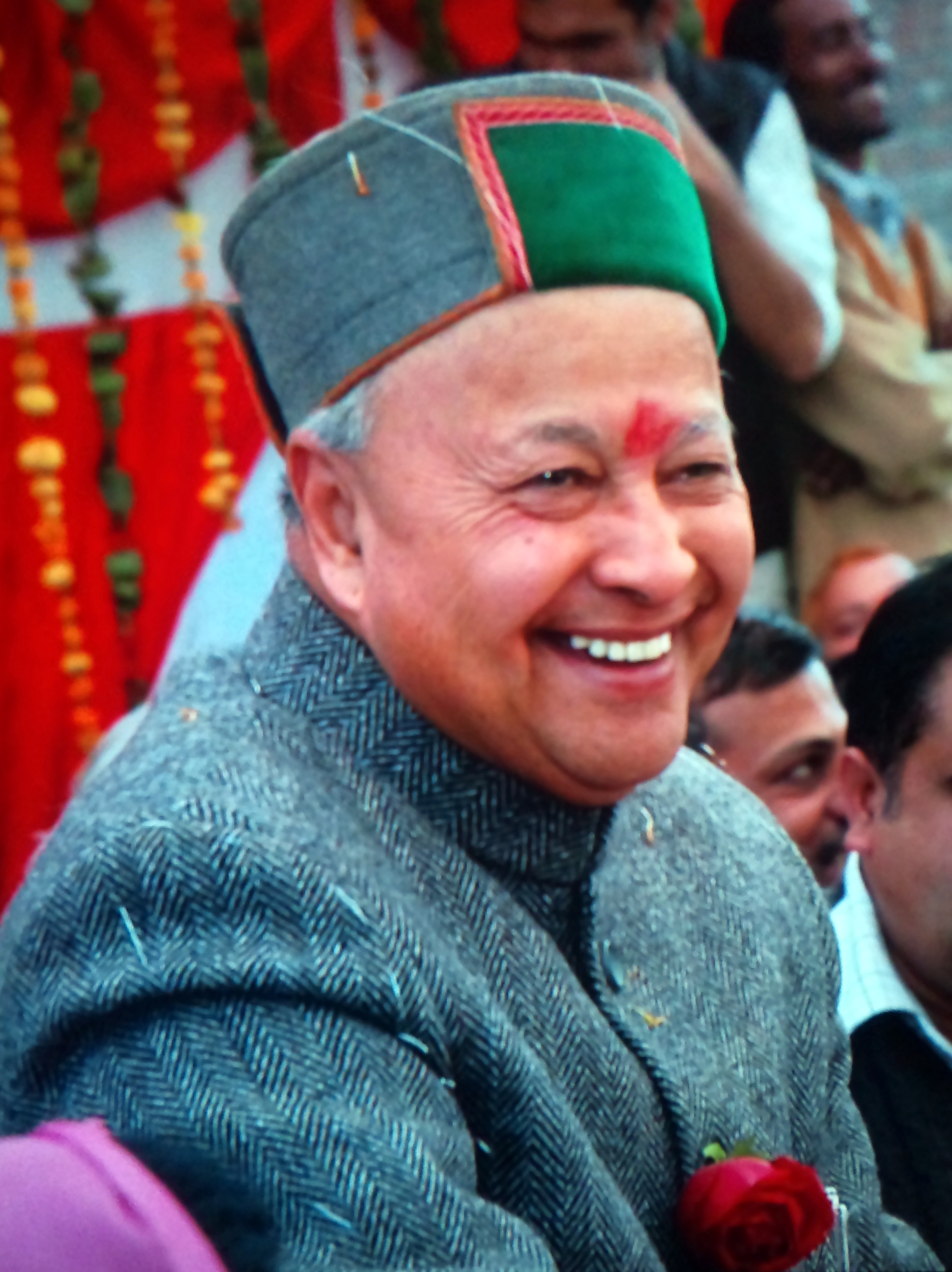

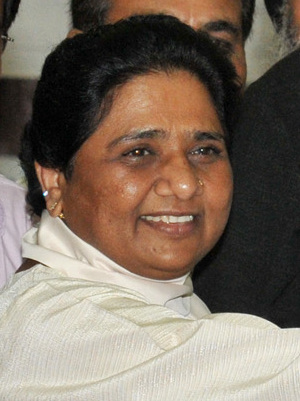
	Majority party	Minority party	Third party
Leader	Prem Kumar Dhumal	Virbhadra Singh	Mayawati
Party	BJP	INC	BSP
Leader's seat	Bamsan	Rohru	Did not contest
Seats before	16	43
Seats won	41	23	1
Seat change	▲25	▼20	▲1
Popular vote	1,441,142	1,280,480	238,959
Percentage	43.78%	38.90%	7.26%
Swing	▲8.44%	▼2.1%	▲6.7%
CM before election
Virbhadra Singh
INC
Elected CM
Prem Kumar Dhumal
BJP

Elections to the Himachal Pradesh Legislative Assembly were held in December 2007, to elect members of the 68 constituencies in Himachal Pradesh, India. The Bharatiya Janata Party won a majority of seats as well as the popular vote, and Prem Kumar Dhumal was reappointed as the Chief Minister of Himachal Pradesh.

The number of constituencies were set as 68, as per the recommendations of The Delimitation of Parliamentary and Assembly Constituencies Order, 1976.

== Parties and alliances ==
=== National Democratic Alliance ===
Party	Flag	Symbol	Leader	Contesting Seats
Bharatiya Janata Party			Prem Kumar Dhumal	68

=== United Progressive Alliance ===
Party	Flag	Symbol	Leader	Contesting Seats
Indian National Congress			Virbhadra Singh	67

=== Others ===
Party	flag	Symbol	Leader	Contesting Seats
Bahujan Samaj Party			Mayawati	67

== Results ==
Rank	Party	Seats contested	Seats won	% votes
1	Bharatiya Janata Party	68	41	43.78
2	Indian National Congress	67	23	38.9
3	Independent	60	3	7.97
4	Bahujan Samaj Party	67	1	7.26
Total			68	

== Elected members ==
Constituency	Reserved for (SC/ST/None)	Member	Party	Vote	Runner-up Candidates Name	Party	vote
Kinnaur	ST	Tejwant Singh	Bharatiya Janata Party	17873	Jagat Singh Negi	Indian National Congress	15384
Rampur	SC	Nand Lal	Indian National Congress	26430	Brij Lal	Bharatiya Janata Party	19960
Rohru	None	Virbhadra Singh	Indian National Congress	30079	Khushi Ram Balnatah	Bharatiya Janata Party	15942
Jubbal-kotkhai	None	Narinder Bragta	Bharatiya Janata Party	23714	Rohit	Indian National Congress	20890
Chopal	None	Subhash Chand Manglate	Indian National Congress	20785	Radha Raman Shastri	Bharatiya Janata Party	16453
Kumarsain	None	Vidya Stokes	Indian National Congress	17375	Pramod Kumar Sharma	Independent	16125
Theog	None	Rakesh Verma	Independent	21907	Rajinder Singh	Indian National Congress	16623
Simla	None	Suresh Bhardwaj	Bharatiya Janata Party	12443	Sanjay Chauhan	Communist Party of India	9855
Kasumpti	SC	Sohan Lal	Indian National Congress	22931	Tarsem Bharti	Bharatiya Janata Party	15632
Arki	None	Gobind Ram	Bharatiya Janata Party	21168	Dharam Pal Thakur	Independent	14481
Doon	None	Vinod Kumari	Bharatiya Janata Party	22470	Ch. Lajja Ram	Indian National Congress	18974
Nalagarh	None	Hari Narayan Singh	Bharatiya Janata Party	28929	Lakhwinder Singh Rana(Papu)	Indian National Congress	25108
Kasauli	SC	Rajiv Saizal	Bharatiya Janata Party	21396	Raghu Raj	Indian National Congress	15022
Solan	None	Rajeev Bindal	Bharatiya Janata Party	23597	Kailash Prashar	Indian National Congress	19881
Pachhad	SC	Gangu Ram Musafir	Indian National Congress	25383	Suresh Kumar Kashyap	Bharatiya Janata Party	22674
Rainka	SC	Prem Singh	Indian National Congress	20756	Balbir Singh	Bharatiya Janata Party	17477
Shillai	None	Harshwardhan Chauhan	Indian National Congress	20247	Amar Singh Chauhan	Independent	16783
Paonta Doon	None	Sukh Ram	Bharatiya Janata Party	29322	Kirnesh Jung	Indian National Congress	24460
Nahan	None	Kush Parmar	Indian National Congress	15714	Shyama Sharma	Bharatiya Janata Party	14968
Kot-kehloor	None	Randhir Sharma	Bharatiya Janata Party	26828	Thakur Ram Lal	Indian National Congress	21874
Bilaspur	None	Jagat Prakash Nadda	Bharatiya Janata Party	24634	Bamber Thakur	Independent	13453
Ghumarwin	None	Rajesh Dharmani	Indian National Congress	24194	Karam Dev Dharmani	Bharatiya Janata Party	22263
Geharwin	SC	Rikhi Ram Kaundal	Bharatiya Janata Party	24411	Beeru Ram Kishore	Indian National Congress	19777
Nadaun	None	Sukhvinder Singh Sukhu	Indian National Congress	17727	Vijay Agnihotri	Bharatiya Janata Party	17141
Hamirpur	None	Urmil Thakur	Bharatiya Janata Party	26378	Anita K Verma	Indian National Congress	19417
Bamsan	None	Prem Kumar Dhumal	Bharatiya Janata Party	35054	Col. Bidhi Chand	Indian National Congress	9047
Mewa	SC	Ishwar Dass Dhiman	Bharatiya Janata Party	24421	Suresh Kumar	Indian National Congress	14046
Nadaunta	None	Baldev Sharma	Bharatiya Janata Party	25634	Vidya Kumari Jar	Indian National Congress	10070
Gagret	SC	Balbir Singh	Bharatiya Janata Party	23914	Kuldeep Kumar	Indian National Congress	20843
Chintpurni	None	Rakesh Kalia	Indian National Congress	26737	Narender Sharma	Bharatiya Janata Party	10602
Santokgarh	None	Mukesh Agnihotri	Indian National Congress	31267	Jagroop Singh	Bharatiya Janata Party	24643
Una	None	Satpal Singh 'satti'	Bharatiya Janata Party	33050	Virender Gautam	Indian National Congress	21198
Kutlehar	None	Virender Kanwar	Bharatiya Janata Party	24677	Ram Nath Sharma	Indian National Congress	17734
Nurpur	None	Rakesh Pathania	Independent	29128	Ajay Mahajan	Indian National Congress	24963
Gangath	SC	Des Raj	Bharatiya Janata Party	24520	Anita Kumari	Independent	23830
Jawali	None	Rajan Sushant	Bharatiya Janata Party	26729	Sujan Singh Pathania	Indian National Congress	21548
Guler	None	Neeraj Bharti	Indian National Congress	21500	Harbans Singh	Bharatiya Janata Party	17499
Jaswan	None	Nikhil Rajour (manu Sharma)	Indian National Congress	17692	Bikram Singh	Bharatiya Janata Party	17574
Pragpur	SC	Yog Raj	Indian National Congress	21253	Naveen Dhiman	Bharatiya Janata Party	20911
Jawalamukhi	None	Ramesh Chand	Bharatiya Janata Party	22562	Sanjay Rattan	Independent	17798
Thural	None	Ravinder Singh	Bharatiya Janata Party	18512	Jagdish Chand Sapehia	Independent	11833
Rajgir	SC	Atma Ram	Bharatiya Janata Party	18829	Dr. Milkhi Ram Goma	Indian National Congress	17611
Baijnath	None	Sudhir Sharma	Indian National Congress	19921	Dulo Ram	Bharatiya Janata Party	16666
Palampur	None	Parveen Kumar	Bharatiya Janata Party	25121	Brij Behari Lal Butail	Indian National Congress	22533
Sulah	None	Vipin Singh Parmar	Bharatiya Janata Party	19375	Jagjiwan Paul	Indian National Congress	18376
Nagrota	None	G. S. Bali	Indian National Congress	28381	Mangal Singh Chaudhary	Bharatiya Janata Party	22630
Shahpur	None	Sarveen Choudhary	Bharatiya Janata Party	25174	Onkar Singh	Bahujan Samaj Party	16143
Dharamsala	None	Kishan Kapoor	Bharatiya Janata Party	20362	Chandresh Kumari	Indian National Congress	12746
Kangra	None	Sanjay Chaudhary	Bahujan Samaj Party	19017	Chaudhary Surender Kaku	Indian National Congress	17708
Bhattiyat	None	Kuldeep Singh Pathania	Indian National Congress	16746	Bhupinder Singh Chauhan	Bharatiya Janata Party	16421
Banikhet	None	Renu Chadha	Bharatiya Janata Party	28310	Asha Kumari	Indian National Congress	26245
Rajnagar	SC	Surinder Bhardwaj	Indian National Congress	23596	Mohan Lal	Bharatiya Janata Party	21774
Chamba	None	Bal Krishan Chauhan	Bharatiya Janata Party	26705	Pawan Nayyar	Indian National Congress	18048
Bharmour	ST	Tulsi Ram	Bharatiya Janata Party	18420	Thakar Singh	Indian National Congress	18404
Lahaul And Spiti	ST	Dr. Ram Lal Markanda	Bharatiya Janata Party	9117	Phunchog Rai	Indian National Congress	6951
Kulu	None	Govind Singh Thakur	Bharatiya Janata Party	28925	Dharamvir Dhami	Bahujan Samaj Party	23892
Banjar	None	Khimi Ram	Bharatiya Janata Party	25037	Satya Parkash Thakur	Indian National Congress	24805
Ani	SC	Kishori Lal	Bharatiya Janata Party	27341	Ishwar Dass	Indian National Congress	25892
Karsog	SC	Hira Lal	Independent	19609	Mansa Ram	Bharatiya Janata Party	14082
Chachiot	None	Jai Ram Thakur	Bharatiya Janata Party	27102	Shiv Lal	Indian National Congress	23917
Nachan	SC	Dile Ram	Bharatiya Janata Party	29228	Tek Chand Dogra	Indian National Congress	21640
Sundernagar	None	Roop Singh	Bharatiya Janata Party	19056	Sohan Lal Thakur	Indian National Congress	16698
Balh	SC	Prakash Chaudhary	Indian National Congress	24941	Damodar Dass	Bharatiya Janata Party	22653
Gopalpur	None	Inder Singh	Bharatiya Janata Party	28898	Rangila Ram Rao	Indian National Congress	21350
Dharampur	None	Mahender Singh	Bharatiya Janata Party	23090	Chander Shekhar	Indian National Congress	13252
Joginder Nagar	None	Gulab Singh	Bharatiya Janata Party	26926	Thakur Surender Paul	Indian National Congress	19923
Darang	None	Kaul Singh	Indian National Congress	29898	Jawahar Lal Thakur	Bharatiya Janata Party	28089
Mandi	None	Anil Kumar	Indian National Congress	22808	Durga Datt	Bharatiya Janata Party	20064
