= Kumar (disambiguation) =

Kumar is a title, a given name, middle name or a family name native to South Asia (mainly India and Nepal and to a lesser extent Sri Lanka).

Kumar may also refer to:

- Kumar (title), an Indian title
- Kumar (name), a given name and surname (and list of people with the name)
- Kumar (Singaporean entertainer), Singaporean cross-dressing performer
- Kumar (musician) (born 1984), Cuban rapper
- Kumar (actor) (1903–1982), Indian actor
- Kumar (magazine), Gujarati-language magazine in India
- Harold & Kumar, an American film franchise

== Geography ==
- Kumar Barilya, a pair of cities in Bangladesh
- Kumar (Jammu and Kashmir), a town in India
- Kumar Bandi, a town in Pakistan
- Jabal Kumar, a mountain in Iraq
- Gir-e Kumar, a mountain in Iraq

== See also ==
- Kumaar, Indian lyricist
- Kumari (disambiguation), the female form of the name
- Inder Kumar Gujral, Indian prime minister (1997–1998)
- Komar (disambiguation)
