= Bilaspur, Himachal Pradesh Assembly constituency =

Legislative Assembly constituency in Himachal Pradesh State, India

Coordinates: 31.33°N 76.76°E

Bilaspur
- Constituency No. 48 for the Himachal Pradesh Legislative Assembly

Constituency details
- Country: India
- Region: North India
- State: Himachal Pradesh
- District: Bilaspur
- Lok Sabha constituency: Hamirpur
- Established: 1967
- Total electors: 83,903
- Reservation: None

Member of Legislative Assembly
- 14th Himachal Pradesh Legislative Assembly
- Incumbent Trilok Jamwal
- Party: Bharatiya Janata Party
- Elected year: 2022

Bilaspur is one of the 68 assembly constituencies of Himachal Pradesh a northern state of India. It is a segment of Hamirpur, Himachal Pradesh Lok Sabha constituency.

== Members of the Legislative Assembly ==
Year	Member	Picture	Party
1967	D.R. Shankhyan		Indian National Congress
1972	Kishori Lal		Indian National Congress
1977	Anand Chand		Independent
1982	Sada Ram Thakur		Bharatiya Janata Party
1985	Babu Ram Gautam		Indian National Congress
1990	Sada Ram Thakur		Bharatiya Janata Party
1993	Jagat Prakash Nadda		Bharatiya Janata Party
1998	Jagat Prakash Nadda		Bharatiya Janata Party
2003	Tilak Raj Sharma		Indian National Congress
2007	Jagat Prakash Nadda		Bharatiya Janata Party
2012	Bumber Thakur		Indian National Congress
2017	Subhash Thakur		Bharatiya Janata Party
2022	Trilok Jamwal		Bharatiya Janata Party

== Election results ==
=== Assembly Election 2022 ===
2022 Himachal Pradesh Legislative Assembly election: Bilaspur
Party	Candidate	Votes	%	±%
BJP	Trilok Jamwal	30,988	47.76%	▼5.66
INC	Bumber Thakur	30,712	47.34%	▲5.53
Independent	Subhash Sharma	1,499	2.31%	New
AAP	Amar Singh	388	0.60%	New
Rashtriya Devbhumi Party	Puja Pal	367	0.57%	New
Margin of victory		276	0.43%	▼11.20
Turnout		64,877	77.32%	▲0.88
Registered electors		83,903		▲8.62
BJP hold		Swing	▼5.66	

=== Assembly Election 2017 ===
2017 Himachal Pradesh Legislative Assembly election: Bilaspur
Party	Candidate	Votes	%	±%
BJP	Subhash Thakur	31,547	53.43%	▲15.67
INC	Bumber Thakur	24,685	41.81%	▼6.06
Independent	Basant Ram Sandhu	1,300	2.20%	New
NOTA	None of the Above	322	0.55%	New
Margin of victory		6,862	11.62%	▲1.51
Turnout		59,046	76.44%	▲5.17
Registered electors		77,244		▲8.23
BJP gain from INC		Swing	▲5.56	

=== Assembly Election 2012 ===
2012 Himachal Pradesh Legislative Assembly election: Bilaspur
Party	Candidate	Votes	%	±%
INC	Bumber Thakur	24,347	47.86%	▲32.24
BJP	Suresh Chandel	19,206	37.76%	▼14.00
Independent	Jitender Chandel	3,607	7.09%	New
Independent	K. D. Lakhanpal	2,095	4.12%	New
BSP	Nand Lal	782	1.54%	▼0.32
HLC	Daulat Ram Sharma	534	1.05%	New
Margin of victory		5,141	10.11%	▼13.39
Turnout		50,867	71.28%	▼2.55
Registered electors		71,367		▲10.70
INC gain from BJP		Swing	▼3.89	

=== Assembly Election 2007 ===
2007 Himachal Pradesh Legislative Assembly election: Bilaspur
Party	Candidate	Votes	%	±%
BJP	J. P. Nadda	24,634	51.76%	▲6.92
Independent	Bamber Thakur	13,453	28.27%	New
INC	Tilak Raj	7,438	15.63%	▼35.28
BSP	Sri Kanth Lal Sharma	886	1.86%	New
CPI	Shyam Lal Thakur	362	0.76%	New
LJP	Dharam Singh Chandel	266	0.56%	▼0.13
Margin of victory		11,181	23.49%	▲17.42
Turnout		47,594	73.83%	▼3.68
Registered electors		64,468		▲11.23
BJP gain from INC		Swing	▲0.85	

=== Assembly Election 2003 ===
2003 Himachal Pradesh Legislative Assembly election: Bilaspur
Party	Candidate	Votes	%	±%
INC	Tilak Raj	22,868	50.91%	▲16.19
BJP	J. P. Nadda	20,142	44.84%	▼11.15
HVC	Baldev Singh Thakur	1,167	2.60%	▼3.20
Independent	Naresh Kumar Pandit	434	0.97%	New
LJP	Dharam Singh	308	0.69%	New
Margin of victory		2,726	6.07%	▼15.20
Turnout		44,919	77.50%	▲5.19
Registered electors		57,958		▲10.75
INC gain from BJP		Swing	▼5.08	

=== Assembly Election 1998 ===
1998 Himachal Pradesh Legislative Assembly election: Bilaspur
Party	Candidate	Votes	%	±%
BJP	J. P. Nadda	21,189	55.99%	▲4.12
INC	Babu Ram Gautam	13,140	34.72%	▼10.55
HVC	Sada Ram Thakur	2,195	5.80%	New
CPI	Bhagat Singh	795	2.10%	New
BSP	Madan Lal	399	1.05%	▼0.35
Margin of victory		8,049	21.27%	▲14.67
Turnout		37,844	73.11%	▼0.67
Registered electors		52,333		▲13.20
BJP hold		Swing	▲4.12	

=== Assembly Election 1993 ===
1993 Himachal Pradesh Legislative Assembly election: Bilaspur
Party	Candidate	Votes	%	±%
BJP	J. P. Nadda	17,500	51.87%	▼9.57
INC	Babu Ram Gautam	15,274	45.27%	▲9.88
BSP	Madan Lal	475	1.41%	New
Margin of victory		2,226	6.60%	▼19.45
Turnout		33,741	73.43%	▲2.51
Registered electors		46,229		▲9.32
BJP hold		Swing		

=== Assembly Election 1990 ===
1990 Himachal Pradesh Legislative Assembly election: Bilaspur
Party	Candidate	Votes	%	±%
BJP	Sadaram Thakur	18,309	61.44%	▲14.15
INC	Shiv Ram	10,547	35.39%	▼13.51
Proutist Bloc, India	Diwakar Sharma	400	1.34%	New
Independent	Bachan Singh	356	1.19%	New
Margin of victory		7,762	26.05%	▲24.43
Turnout		29,802	71.18%	▼0.30
Registered electors		42,288		▲31.55
BJP gain from INC		Swing	▲12.54	

=== Assembly Election 1985 ===
1985 Himachal Pradesh Legislative Assembly election: Bilaspur
Party	Candidate	Votes	%	±%
INC	Babu Ram Gautam	11,125	48.90%	▲5.97
BJP	Sada Ram Thakur	10,757	47.28%	▼2.78
Independent	Jai Kumar	545	2.40%	New
Independent	Bachan Singh	178	0.78%	New
Margin of victory		368	1.62%	▼5.51
Turnout		22,751	71.39%	▲0.54
Registered electors		32,147		▲8.22
INC gain from BJP		Swing	▼1.17	

=== Assembly Election 1982 ===
1982 Himachal Pradesh Legislative Assembly election: Bilaspur
Party	Candidate	Votes	%	±%
BJP	Sada Ram Thakur	10,445	50.06%	New
INC	Partap Singh	8,957	42.93%	New
Independent	Amar Singh Maratha	482	2.31%	New
JP	Krishan Lal	350	1.68%	▼43.94
Independent	Durga Singh	169	0.81%	New
Independent	Gajan Singh	167	0.80%	New
LKD	Karam Dev Chatak	129	0.62%	New
Margin of victory		1,488	7.13%	▼1.64
Turnout		20,863	71.18%	▲7.92
Registered electors		29,704		▲14.13
BJP gain from Independent		Swing	▼4.32	

=== Assembly Election 1977 ===
1977 Himachal Pradesh Legislative Assembly election: Bilaspur
Party	Candidate	Votes	%	±%
Independent	Anand Chand	8,821	54.39%	New
JP	Sant Ram Sant	7,398	45.61%	New
Margin of victory		1,423	8.77%	▼18.44
Turnout		16,219	62.99%	▲20.46
Registered electors		26,026		▲0.36
Independent gain from INC		Swing	▲4.35	

=== Assembly Election 1972 ===
1972 Himachal Pradesh Legislative Assembly election: Bilaspur
Party	Candidate	Votes	%	±%
INC	Kishori Lal	5,431	50.03%	▲2.88
LRP	Sant Ram	2,477	22.82%	New
Independent	Kanshi Ram Bhandari	756	6.96%	New
Independent	Devi Ram	564	5.20%	New
CPI	Shankar Singh	497	4.58%	New
ABJS	Kuldip Singh	477	4.39%	New
Independent	Teg Singh	337	3.10%	New
Independent	Kali Dass	232	2.14%	New
Independent	Nand Lal	84	0.77%	New
Margin of victory		2,954	27.21%	▲15.74
Turnout		10,855	43.12%	▼6.54
Registered electors		25,932		▼13.15
INC hold		Swing	▲2.88	

=== Assembly Election 1967 ===
1967 Himachal Pradesh Legislative Assembly election: Bilaspur
Party	Candidate	Votes	%	±%
INC	D. R. Shankhyan	6,815	47.16%	New
SWA	D. Nath	5,157	35.68%	New
Independent	T. Ram	1,140	7.89%	New
SSP	Gokal	679	4.70%	New
Independent	A. Nath	440	3.04%	New
Independent	Hariman	221	1.53%	New
Margin of victory		1,658	11.47%	
Turnout		14,452	51.54%	
Registered electors		29,859		
INC win (new seat)				

== See also ==
- Bilaspur district
- List of constituencies of Himachal Pradesh Legislative Assembly
