= Kinnaur Assembly constituency =

Legislative Assembly constituency in Himachal Pradesh State, India

Coordinates: 31.56°N 78.45°E

Kinnaur
- Constituency No. 68 for the Himachal Pradesh Legislative Assembly

Constituency details
- Country: India
- Region: North India
- State: Himachal Pradesh
- District: Kinnaur
- Lok Sabha constituency: Mandi
- Established: 1967
- Total electors: 60,289
- Reservation: ST

Member of Legislative Assembly
- 14th Himachal Pradesh Legislative Assembly
- Incumbent Jagat Singh Negi
- Party: Indian National Congress
- Elected year: 2022

Kinnaur is one of the 68 assembly constituencies of Himachal Pradesh a northern Indian state. Kinnaur is also part of Mandi Lok Sabha constituency.

== Members of the Legislative Assembly ==
Year	Member	Picture	Party
1967	Thakur Sen Negi		Independent
1972	Thakur Sen Negi		Lok Raj Party
1977	Thakur Sen Negi		Independent
1982	Thakur Sen Negi		Independent
1985	Dev Raj Negi		Indian National Congress
1990	Thakur Sen Negi		Bharatiya Janata Party
1993	Dev Raj Negi		Indian National Congress
1995 (Note: by-election)	Jagat Singh Negi		Indian National Congress
1998	Chet Ram Negi		Bharatiya Janata Party
2003	Jagat Singh Negi		Indian National Congress
2007	Tejwant Singh Negi		Bharatiya Janata Party
2012	Jagat Singh Negi		Indian National Congress
2017	Jagat Singh Negi		Indian National Congress
2022	Jagat Singh Negi		Indian National Congress

== Election results ==
=== Assembly Election 2022 ===
2022 Himachal Pradesh Legislative Assembly election: Kinnaur
Party	Candidate	Votes	%	±%
INC	Jagat Singh Negi	20,696	46.95	▼0.42
BJP	Surat Negi	13,732	31.15	▼15.94
Independent	Tejwant Singh	8,574	19.45	New
AAP	Tersem Singh	580	1.32	New
BSP	Anil Kapoor	280	0.64	▼0.32
NOTA	Nota	223	0.51	▼0.08
Margin of victory		6,964	15.80	▲15.51
Turnout		44,085	73.12	▼3.21
Registered electors		60,289		▲8.84
INC hold		Swing	▼0.42	

=== Assembly Election 2017 ===
2017 Himachal Pradesh Legislative Assembly election: Kinnaur
Party	Candidate	Votes	%	±%
INC	Jagat Singh Negi	20,029	47.37	▼6.52
BJP	Tejwant Singh Negi	19,909	47.09	▲9.55
CPI(M)	Jeevan Singh	913	2.16	New
BSP	Kailash Chand	404	0.96	▼0.34
RPS	Rajeev Kumar Negi	321	0.76	New
NOTA	None of the Above	249	0.59	New
Margin of victory		120	0.28	▼16.07
Turnout		42,282	76.34	▲2.18
Registered electors		55,390		▲6.83
INC hold		Swing	▼6.52	

=== Assembly Election 2012 ===
2012 Himachal Pradesh Legislative Assembly election: Kinnaur
Party	Candidate	Votes	%	±%
INC	Jagat Singh Negi	20,722	53.89	▲9.78
BJP	Tejwant Singh Negi	14,434	37.54	▼13.71
HLC	Chet Ram Negi	2,240	5.83	New
BSP	Kailash Chand	499	1.30	▼1.60
NCP	Sunder Dev Negi	418	1.09	New
Margin of victory		6,288	16.35	▲9.22
Turnout		38,450	74.16	▲3.16
Registered electors		51,850		▲5.55
INC gain from BJP		Swing	▲2.64	

=== Assembly Election 2007 ===
2007 Himachal Pradesh Legislative Assembly election: Kinnaur
Party	Candidate	Votes	%	±%
BJP	Tejwant Singh	17,873	51.25	▲18.04
INC	Jagat Singh Negi	15,384	44.11	▼10.22
BSP	Susheel Sagar	1,009	2.89	New
LJP	Bhagat Singh	465	1.33	New
Margin of victory		2,489	7.14	▼13.98
Turnout		34,875	70.99	▼1.29
Registered electors		49,125		▲1.26
BJP gain from INC		Swing	▼3.09	

=== Assembly Election 2003 ===
2003 Himachal Pradesh Legislative Assembly election: Kinnaur
Party	Candidate	Votes	%	±%
INC	Jagat Singh Negi	19,052	54.33	▲14.63
BJP	Tejwant Singh	11,646	33.21	▼16.36
HVC	Sambub Chhosfale Negi	2,728	7.78	▲0.42
CPI(M)	Sukh Dev	1,638	4.67	New
Margin of victory		7,406	21.12	▲11.25
Turnout		35,064	72.38	▲1.15
Registered electors		48,513		▲2.64
INC gain from BJP		Swing	▲4.76	

=== Assembly Election 1998 ===
1998 Himachal Pradesh Legislative Assembly election: Kinnaur
Party	Candidate	Votes	%	±%
BJP	Chet Ram Negi	16,667	49.58	New
INC	Jagat Singh Negi	13,347	39.70	New
HVC	Sambub Chhosfale Negi	2,473	7.36	New
Independent	Rattan Manjari	1,132	3.37	New
Margin of victory		3,320	9.88	
Turnout		33,619	72.43	
Registered electors		47,263		
BJP gain from INC		Swing		

=== Assembly By-election 1995 ===
1995 Himachal Pradesh Legislative Assembly by-election: Kinnaur
Party	Candidate	Votes	%	±%
INC	Jagat Singh Negi	17,056		
BJP	Chet Ram Negi	14,563		
Margin of victory		2,493		
INC hold		Swing		

=== Assembly Election 1993 ===
1993 Himachal Pradesh Legislative Assembly election: Kinnaur
Party	Candidate	Votes	%	±%
INC	Dev Raj Negi	13,746	51.03	New
BJP	Thakur Sen Negi	12,864	47.75	▼11.66
BSP	Akal Jeet Negi	225	0.84	New
Margin of victory		882	3.27	▼18.49
Turnout		26,938	66.83	▼6.63
Registered electors		40,923		▼0.21
INC gain from BJP		Swing		

=== Assembly Election 1990 ===
1990 Himachal Pradesh Legislative Assembly election: Kinnaur
Party	Candidate	Votes	%	±%
BJP	Thakur Sen Negi	17,653	59.41	New
Independent	Gopi Chand	11,187	37.65	New
Independent	Harish Chandra Negi	633	2.13	New
Independent	Mangal Singh Negi	239	0.80	New
Margin of victory		6,466	21.76	▲13.26
Turnout		29,712	73.58	▼1.43
Registered electors		41,008		▲27.84
BJP gain from INC		Swing	▲5.16	

=== Assembly Election 1985 ===
1985 Himachal Pradesh Legislative Assembly election: Kinnaur
Party	Candidate	Votes	%	±%
INC	Dev Raj Negi	12,859	54.25	▲12.02
Independent	Thakur Sen Negi	10,843	45.75	New
Margin of victory		2,016	8.51	▼7.03
Turnout		23,702	76.49	▲3.00
Registered electors		32,078		▲4.42
INC gain from Independent		Swing	▼3.51	

=== Assembly Election 1982 ===
1982 Himachal Pradesh Legislative Assembly election: Kinnaur
Party	Candidate	Votes	%	±%
Independent	Thakur Sen Negi	12,580	57.77	New
INC	Gopi Chand	9,197	42.23	New
Margin of victory		3,383	15.53	▼32.95
Turnout		21,777	72.64	▲12.11
Registered electors		30,721		▲15.11
Independent hold		Swing	▼9.44	

=== Assembly Election 1977 ===
1977 Himachal Pradesh Legislative Assembly election: Kinnaur
Party	Candidate	Votes	%	±%
Independent	Thakur Sen Negi	10,543	67.21	New
Independent	Gyan Singh	2,937	18.72	New
JP	Balwant Singh	2,207	14.07	New
Margin of victory		7,606	48.49	▲5.65
Turnout		15,687	62.20	▼11.77
Registered electors		26,689		▲4.27
Independent gain from LRP		Swing	▼4.21	

=== Assembly Election 1972 ===
1972 Himachal Pradesh Legislative Assembly election: Kinnaur
Party	Candidate	Votes	%	±%
LRP	Thakur Sen Negi	12,896	71.42	New
INC	Gyan Singh	5,161	28.58	▲16.88
Margin of victory		7,735	42.84	▼33.76
Turnout		18,057	70.61	▲3.66
Registered electors		25,595		▲11.49
LRP gain from Independent		Swing	▼16.88	

=== Assembly Election 1967 ===
1967 Himachal Pradesh Legislative Assembly election: Kinnaur
Party	Candidate	Votes	%	±%
Independent	Thakur Sen Negi	13,559	88.30	New
INC	Gyan Singh	1,797	11.70	New
Margin of victory		11,762	76.60	
Turnout		15,356	66.91	
Registered electors		22,957		
Independent win (new seat)				

== See also ==
- List of constituencies of the Himachal Pradesh Legislative Assembly
- Kinnaur district
- Kinnaur
