= Shillai Assembly constituency =

Legislative Assembly constituency in Himachal Pradesh State, India

Coordinates: 30.68°N 77.71°E

Shillai
- Constituency No. 59 for the Himachal Pradesh Legislative Assembly

Constituency details
- Country: India
- Region: North India
- State: Himachal Pradesh
- District: Sirmaur
- Lok Sabha constituency: Shimla
- Established: 1972
- Total electors: 76,343
- Reservation: None

Member of Legislative Assembly
- 14th Himachal Pradesh Legislative Assembly
- Incumbent Harshwardhan Chauhan
- Party: Indian National Congress
- Elected year: 2022

Shillai Assembly constituency is one of the 68 assembly constituencies of Himachal Pradesh a northern Indian state. Shillai is also part of Shimla Lok Sabha constituency.

== Members of the Legislative Assembly ==
Year	Member	Picture	Party
1972	Guman Singh Chauhan		Indian National Congress
1977	Guman Singh Chauhan		Indian National Congress
1982	Guman Singh Chauhan		Indian National Congress
1985	Guman Singh Chauhan		Indian National Congress
1990	Jagat Singh Negi		Janata Dal
1993	Harshwardhan Chauhan		Indian National Congress
1998	Harshwardhan Chauhan		Indian National Congress
2003	Harshwardhan Chauhan		Indian National Congress
2007	Harshwardhan Chauhan		Indian National Congress
2012	Baldev Singh Tomar		Bharatiya Janata Party
2017	Harshwardhan Chauhan		Indian National Congress
2022	Harshwardhan Chauhan		Indian National Congress

== Election results ==
=== Assembly Election 2022 ===
2022 Himachal Pradesh Legislative Assembly election: Shillai
Party	Candidate	Votes	%	±%
INC	Harshwardhan Chauhan	32,093	49.17%	▼2.13
BJP	Baldev Singh Tomar	31,711	48.58%	▲4.54
NOTA	Nota	525	0.80%	▼0.03
AAP	Naathu Ram Chauhan	488	0.75%	New
Rashtriya Devbhumi Party	Suresh Kumar	454	0.70%	New
Margin of victory		382	0.59%	▼6.67
Turnout		65,271	85.50%	▼0.95
Registered electors		76,343		▲16.06
INC hold		Swing	▼2.13	

=== Assembly Election 2017 ===
2017 Himachal Pradesh Legislative Assembly election: Shillai
Party	Candidate	Votes	%	±%
INC	Harshwardhan Chauhan	29,171	51.30%	▲6.05
BJP	Baldev Singh Tomar	25,046	44.05%	▼5.23
Swabhiman Party	Mani Ram	850	1.49%	New
NOTA	None of the Above	475	0.84%	New
BSP	Kedar Singh Jindan	463	0.81%	▼0.02
Margin of victory		4,125	7.25%	▲3.22
Turnout		56,863	86.45%	▲3.74
Registered electors		65,777		▲14.30
INC gain from BJP		Swing	▲2.02	

=== Assembly Election 2012 ===
2012 Himachal Pradesh Legislative Assembly election: Shillai
Party	Candidate	Votes	%	±%
BJP	Baldev Singh Tomar	23,455	49.28%	▲40.89
INC	Harshwardhan Chauhan	21,537	45.25%	▼1.71
CPI(M)	Hari Ram	1,346	2.83%	New
NCP	Kedar Singh Jindan	810	1.70%	▼0.13
BSP	Naathu Ram Chauhan	396	0.83%	▼0.76
Margin of victory		1,918	4.03%	▼4.00
Turnout		47,595	82.70%	▲4.38
Registered electors		57,549		▲4.54
BJP gain from INC		Swing	▲2.32	

=== Assembly Election 2007 ===
2007 Himachal Pradesh Legislative Assembly election: Shillai
Party	Candidate	Votes	%	±%
INC	Harshwardhan Chauhan	20,247	46.96%	▲2.20
Independent	Amar Singh Chauhan	16,783	38.92%	New
BJP	Baldev Singh Tomar	3,616	8.39%	▼13.26
LJP	Naathu Ram Chauhan	988	2.29%	New
NCP	Kedar Singh Jindan	790	1.83%	New
BSP	Raksha Devi	688	1.60%	New
Margin of victory		3,464	8.03%	▼11.14
Turnout		43,118	78.33%	▼0.33
Registered electors		55,050		▲11.84
INC hold		Swing	▲2.20	

=== Assembly Election 2003 ===
2003 Himachal Pradesh Legislative Assembly election: Shillai
Party	Candidate	Votes	%	±%
INC	Harshwardhan Chauhan	17,326	44.76%	▼17.54
Independent	Jagat Singh	9,902	25.58%	New
BJP	Dalip Singh	8,379	21.64%	▼12.53
HVC	Sita Ram Sharma	3,105	8.02%	▲5.99
Margin of victory		7,424	19.18%	▼8.95
Turnout		38,712	78.70%	▲1.27
Registered electors		49,220		▲11.74
INC hold		Swing	▼17.54	

=== Assembly Election 1998 ===
1998 Himachal Pradesh Legislative Assembly election: Shillai
Party	Candidate	Votes	%	±%
INC	Harshwardhan Chauhan	21,234	62.30%	▲1.39
BJP	Jagat Singh Negi	11,646	34.17%	▼4.92
HVC	Sita Ram Sharma	693	2.03%	New
JD	Inder Singh	510	1.50%	New
Margin of victory		9,588	28.13%	▲6.32
Turnout		34,083	78.97%	▼0.40
Registered electors		44,048		▲9.29
INC hold		Swing	▲1.39	

=== Assembly Election 1993 ===
1993 Himachal Pradesh Legislative Assembly election: Shillai
Party	Candidate	Votes	%	±%
INC	Harshwardhan Chauhan	19,092	60.91%	▲26.99
BJP	Jagat Singh Negi	12,254	39.09%	New
Margin of victory		6,838	21.81%	▲9.94
Turnout		31,346	78.63%	▼0.06
Registered electors		40,302		▲7.41
INC gain from JD		Swing		

=== Assembly Election 1990 ===
1990 Himachal Pradesh Legislative Assembly election: Shillai
Party	Candidate	Votes	%	±%
JD	Jagat Singh Negi	13,375	45.79%	New
INC	Harshwardhan Chauhan	9,907	33.92%	▼37.58
Independent	Sobha Ram Chauhan	5,925	20.29%	New
Margin of victory		3,468	11.87%	▼31.12
Turnout		29,207	78.71%	▲9.82
Registered electors		37,522		▲15.12
JD gain from INC		Swing		

=== Assembly Election 1985 ===
1985 Himachal Pradesh Legislative Assembly election: Shillai
Party	Candidate	Votes	%	±%
INC	Guman Singh Chauhan	15,852	71.50%	▲20.34
LKD	Jagat Singh Negi	6,319	28.50%	▼11.35
Margin of victory		9,533	43.00%	▲31.69
Turnout		22,171	69.07%	▼7.14
Registered electors		32,595		▲4.06
INC hold		Swing		

=== Assembly Election 1982 ===
1982 Himachal Pradesh Legislative Assembly election: Shillai
Party	Candidate	Votes	%	±%
INC	Guman Singh Chauhan	12,042	51.16%	▲10.68
LKD	Jagat Singh Negi	9,381	39.85%	New
BJP	Jagpal Singh	2,117	8.99%	New
Margin of victory		2,661	11.30%	▲10.66
Turnout		23,540	76.23%	▲22.41
Registered electors		31,322		▲11.55
INC hold		Swing	▲10.68	

=== Assembly Election 1977 ===
1977 Himachal Pradesh Legislative Assembly election: Shillai
Party	Candidate	Votes	%	±%
INC	Guman Singh Chauhan	5,994	40.47%	▼41.00
JP	Jagat Singh Negi	5,899	39.83%	New
Independent	Jaggi Ram	1,607	10.85%	New
Independent	Rattan Singh	1,170	7.90%	New
Independent	Sobha Ram Sharma	140	0.95%	New
Margin of victory		95	0.64%	▼62.31
Turnout		14,810	53.60%	▲3.48
Registered electors		28,078		▲4.31
INC hold		Swing	▼41.00	

=== Assembly Election 1972 ===
1972 Himachal Pradesh Legislative Assembly election: Shillai
Party	Candidate	Votes	%	±%
INC	Guman Singh Chauhan	10,805	81.47%	New
LRP	Partap Singh	2,457	18.53%	New
Margin of victory		8,348	62.95%	
Turnout		13,262	51.32%	
Registered electors		26,917		
INC win (new seat)				

== See also ==
- List of constituencies of the Himachal Pradesh Legislative Assembly
- Shillai
- Sirmaur district
