= Hardeep Singh Bawa =

Indian politician

Member of Himachal Pradesh Legislative Assembly
- Incumbent
- Assumed office 13 July 2024
- Preceded by: Krishan Lal Thakur
- Constituency: Nalagarh

Personal details
- Party: Indian National Congress

Hardeep Singh Bawa is an Indian politician from Himachal Pradesh. As a member of Indian National Congress, he is the incumbent MLA from Nalagarh.
