= Kumari =

Kumari may refer to:

== Places ==
- Kumari, Nepal, a town in central Nepal
- Kumari (Afyon), a city in Turkey
- Kumari (Kutahya), a town in Turkey
- Kumari (island), an island in Estonia

== Religion ==
- Kumari (goddess), in Hinduism
- Kaumari, one of the Matrikas, a group of Hindu goddesses
- Devi Kanya Kumari, the virgin goddess, South India

== Other uses ==
- Kumari (1952 film), a 1952 Tamil-language film
- Kumari (1977 film), a 1977 Nepali film
- Kumari (2022 film), a 2022 Malayalam-language film
- Kumari Bank Limited, a commercial bank of Nepal

== People ==
- Kumari (actress) (1921–2008), Indian film actress
- Kumari Kamala (born 1934), Indian classical dancer
- Kumari Thankam (?–2011), Malayalam film actress during the 1950s
- Deepika Kumari (born 1994), Indian archer
- Eerik Kumari (1912–1984), Estonian naturalist
- Raja Kumari (born 1986), American singer
- Vinod Kumari, Indian politician
- Jyoti Kumari, heroic Indian cyclist and recipient of Bal Puraskar 2021

== See also ==
- Kumar (disambiguation)
- Brahma Kumaris, an Indian spiritual movement
- Kanyakumari, a town in Tamil Nadu, India
- Kanwari, village in Haryana, India
