= Kot-Kehloor Assembly constituency =

Constituency of the Himachal Pradesh legislative assembly in India

Coordinates: 31.29°N 76.52°E

Kot-Kehloor
- Former constituency for the Himachal Pradesh Legislative Assembly

Constituency details
- Country: India
- Region: North India
- State: Himachal Pradesh
- Established: 1972
- Abolished: 2007
- Total electors: 65,765

Kot-Kehloor Assembly constituency was an assembly constituency in the India state of Himachal Pradesh.

== Members of the Legislative Assembly ==
Election	Member	Party
1972	Kuldip Singh	Indian National Congress
1977	Daulat Ram Sankhyan	Janata Party
1982	Daulat Ram Sankhyan	Indian National Congress
1985	Ram Lal Thakur	Indian National Congress
1990	Krishan Kumar Kaushal	Communist Party of India
1993	Ram Lal Thakur	Indian National Congress
1998	Ram Lal Thakur	Indian National Congress
2003	Ram Lal Thakur	Indian National Congress
2007	Randhir Sharma	Bharatiya Janata Party

== Election results ==
=== Assembly Election 2007 ===
2007 Himachal Pradesh Legislative Assembly election: Kot-Kehloor
Party	Candidate	Votes	%	±%
BJP	Randhir Sharma	26,828	51.38%	▲16.52
INC	Ram Lal Thakur	21,874	41.90%	▲0.69
BSP	Dr. Sukh Ram Chauhan	2,394	4.59%	▲2.95
CPI	Jeet Ram Chaudhary	1,064	2.04%	▼0.13
Margin of victory		4,954	9.49%	▲3.15
Turnout		52,211	79.39%	▼0.43
Registered electors		65,765		▲10.86
BJP gain from INC		Swing	▲10.18	

=== Assembly Election 2003 ===
2003 Himachal Pradesh Legislative Assembly election: Kot-Kehloor
Party	Candidate	Votes	%	±%
INC	Ram Lal Thakur	19,509	41.20%	▼9.59
BJP	Randheer Kumar	16,507	34.86%	▼8.30
HVC	Krishan Kumar Kaushal	8,276	17.48%	▲15.97
Independent	Dharmender Singh	1,254	2.65%	New
CPI	Rattan Lal	1,028	2.17%	▼1.16
BSP	Durga Dass	774	1.63%	▲0.75
Margin of victory		3,002	6.34%	▼1.29
Turnout		47,348	79.82%	▲2.10
Registered electors		59,321		▲14.90
INC hold		Swing	▼9.59	

=== Assembly Election 1998 ===
1998 Himachal Pradesh Legislative Assembly election: Kot-Kehloor
Party	Candidate	Votes	%	±%
INC	Ram Lal Thakur	20,381	50.79%	▼1.64
BJP	Krishan Kumar Kaushal	17,321	43.17%	▲25.80
CPI	Hari Lal	1,337	3.33%	▼24.96
HVC	Babu Ram Thakur	606	1.51%	New
BSP	Prabhu Ram	354	0.88%	▼0.38
Margin of victory		3,060	7.63%	▼16.51
Turnout		40,126	78.73%	▼0.22
Registered electors		51,629		▲11.13
INC hold		Swing	▼1.64	

=== Assembly Election 1993 ===
1993 Himachal Pradesh Legislative Assembly election: Kot-Kehloor
Party	Candidate	Votes	%	±%
INC	Ram Lal Thakur	18,985	52.43%	▲13.11
CPI	Krishan Kumar Kaushal	10,245	28.29%	▼28.14
BJP	Sada Ram Thakur	6,289	17.37%	New
BSP	Prabhu Ram	458	1.26%	New
Margin of victory		8,740	24.14%	▲7.02
Turnout		36,211	78.47%	▲2.61
Registered electors		46,460		▲7.12
INC gain from CPI		Swing	▼4.01	

=== Assembly Election 1990 ===
1990 Himachal Pradesh Legislative Assembly election: Kot-Kehloor
Party	Candidate	Votes	%	±%
CPI	Krishan Kumar Kaushal	18,437	56.43%	▲14.15
INC	Ram Lal Thakur	12,846	39.32%	▼4.71
JD	Daulat Ram Sankhyam	818	2.50%	New
Independent	Manohar Lal Shandilya	178	0.54%	New
Margin of victory		5,591	17.11%	▲15.37
Turnout		32,670	76.00%	▼0.60
Registered electors		43,371		▲29.67
CPI gain from INC		Swing	▲12.40	

=== Assembly Election 1985 ===
1985 Himachal Pradesh Legislative Assembly election: Kot-Kehloor
Party	Candidate	Votes	%	±%
INC	Ram Lal Thakur	11,183	44.03%	▲13.64
CPI	Krishan Kumar Kaushal	10,739	42.29%	▲17.26
BJP	Daulat Ram Sharma	3,474	13.68%	▼14.15
Margin of victory		444	1.75%	▼0.81
Turnout		25,396	76.58%	▲8.88
Registered electors		33,448		▲6.49
INC hold		Swing		

=== Assembly Election 1982 ===
1982 Himachal Pradesh Legislative Assembly election: Kot-Kehloor
Party	Candidate	Votes	%	±%
INC	Daulat Ram Sankhyan	6,400	30.39%	▲4.26
BJP	Daulat Ram Sharma	5,861	27.83%	New
CPI	Krishan Kumar Kaushal	5,271	25.03%	New
Independent	Tulsi Ram	1,049	4.98%	New
LKD	Wattan Singh	1,007	4.78%	New
JP	Budhi Singh Kaundal	677	3.21%	▼66.18
Independent	Paras Ram	586	2.78%	New
Independent	Paras Ram Durvasha	208	0.99%	New
Margin of victory		539	2.56%	▼40.71
Turnout		21,059	68.15%	▲4.31
Registered electors		31,409		▲13.26
INC gain from JP		Swing	▼39.01	

=== Assembly Election 1977 ===
1977 Himachal Pradesh Legislative Assembly election: Kot-Kehloor
Party	Candidate	Votes	%	±%
JP	Daulat Ram Sankhyan	12,074	69.40%	New
INC	Kuldip Singh	4,546	26.13%	▼21.48
Independent	Dharam Das	778	4.47%	New
Margin of victory		7,528	43.27%	▲36.69
Turnout		17,398	63.33%	▲13.48
Registered electors		27,731		▲29.32
JP gain from INC		Swing		

=== Assembly Election 1972 ===
1972 Himachal Pradesh Legislative Assembly election: Kot-Kehloor
Party	Candidate	Votes	%	±%
INC	Kuldip Singh	5,029	47.61%	New
Independent	Daulat Ram Sankhyan	4,334	41.03%	New
Independent	Bohra	510	4.83%	New
Independent	Sant Ram	368	3.48%	New
LRP	Asha Ram	247	2.34%	New
ABJS	Hargobind Singh	74	0.70%	New
Margin of victory		695	6.58%	
Turnout		10,562	50.93%	
Registered electors		21,443		
INC win (new seat)				
