= First Dhumal ministry =

- Ministry of Himachal Pradesh
- Date formed: 24 March 1998
- Date dissolved: 5 March 2003

People and organisations
- Chief Minister: Prem Kumar Dhumal
- No. of ministers: 9
- Member parties: BJP
- Status in legislature: Coalition government

History
- Election: 1998 Himachal Pradesh Legislative Assembly election

The First Prem Kumar Dhumal ministry is the Council of Ministers in Himachal Pradesh Legislative Assembly headed by Chief Minister Prem Kumar Dhumal of Bharatiya Janta Party (BJP).

It governed the state from 24 March 1998 to 5 March 2003, completing a full statutory term.

== Background and formation ==
The cabinet was formed after the 1998 Himachal Pradesh Legislative Assembly elections, in which the BJP emerged as the leading party and Prem Kumar Dhumal was elected leader of the legislative party. Dhumal won the Bamsan constituency and was sworn in as Chief Minister.

Himachal Vikas Congress (HVC) supported the government as a coalition to get majority in the assembly.

== Tenure and governance ==
During his tenure, the Dhumal ministry focused on improving infrastructure and the connectivity of the state's road network to rural areas. This emphasis earned Dhumal the reputation of being a Chief Minister focused on roads and infrastructure.

The ministry completed its full five-year term. This was a noteworthy achievement as many governments in the state had shorter tenures.

== Chief Minister and Ministers ==
Sno.	Name	Office	Portfolio	Took Office	Left Office
1	Prem Kumar Dhumal	Chief Minister		24 March 1998	5 March 2003
2	Sukh Ram	Cabinet Minister		24 March 1998	5 March 2003
3	Mohinder Singh	Cabinet Minister		24 March 1998	5 March 2003
4	Kishori Lal Vaidya	Cabinet Minister		24 March 1998	5 March 2003
5	Jagat Prakash Nadda	Cabinet Minister		24 March 1998	5 March 2003
6	Mansa Ram	Cabinet Minister		24 March 1998	5 March 2003
7	Kishan Kapoor	Cabinet Minister		24 March 1998	5 March 2003
8	Ramesh Chand Choudhary	Cabinet Minister		24 March 1998	5 March 2003
9	Prakash Choudhary	Cabinet Minister		24 March 1998	5 March 2003

== See also ==
- Second Shanta Kumar ministry (1990–92)
