= Randhir Sharma =

Indian politician (born 1963)

Member of the Himachal Pradesh Legislative Assembly
- In office 2012–2017
- Incumbent
- Assumed office 2022
- Preceded by: Ram Lal Thakur
- Constituency: Sri Naina Deviji

Member of the Himachal Pradesh Legislative Assembly
- In office 2007–2012
- Preceded by: Ram Lal Thakur
- Succeeded by: constituency delimited
- Constituency: Kot-Kehloor

Personal details
- Born: 23 June 1963 (age 63) Guruka-Lahore, Bilaspur district, Himachal Pradesh
- Party: Bharatiya Janata Party
- Education: Master of Arts (Himachal Pradesh University)

Randhir Sharma (born 23 June 1963) is an Indian politician from Himachal Pradesh. He is a member of the Himachal Pradesh Legislative Assembly from Sri Naina Deviji Assembly constituency in Bilaspur district. He won the 2022 Himachal Pradesh Legislative Assembly election representing the Bharatiya Janata Party.

== Early life and education ==
Sharma was born in Guruka-Lahore, Bassi post, Bilaspur district. He is the son of Krishan Lal. He completed his MA in English and later did LLB and diploma in personnel management. He married Rekha Sharma and together they have a son.

== Career ==
Sharma won from Sri Naina Deviji Assembly constituency representing the Bharatiya Janata Party in the 2022 Himachal Pradesh Legislative Assembly election. He polled 29,403 votes and defeated his nearest rival, Ram Lal Thakur of the Indian National Congress, by a margin of 171 votes. He first became an MLA winning the 2007 Himachal Pradesh Legislative Assembly election from Kot-Kehloor Assembly constituency, which was name Sri Naina Deviji after delimitation. He retained the seat in the 2012 Himachal Pradesh Legislative Assembly election. In the 2017 Assembly election, he lost to Ram Lal Thakur of the Indian National Congress, by a margin of 1,042 votes.

He served as the organizing secretary of Akhila Bharatiya Vidyarthi Parishad in Jammu and Kashmir. He also served as the president of the Bharatiya Janata Yuva Morcha, the youth of the Himachal Pradesh BJP.
