= Gehrwin Assembly constituency =

Constituency of the Himachal Pradesh legislative assembly in India

Coordinates: 31.35°N 76.69°E

Gehrwin
- Former constituency for the Himachal Pradesh Legislative Assembly

Constituency details
- Country: India
- Region: North India
- State: Himachal Pradesh
- Established: 1967
- Abolished: 2007
- Total electors: 66,003

Gehrwin Assembly constituency was an assembly constituency in the India state of Himachal Pradesh.

== Members of the Legislative Assembly ==
Election	Member	Party
1967	Niku Ram	Indian National Congress
1972	Niku Ram	Indian National Congress
1977	Bachittar Singh	Janata Party
1982	Ganu Ram	Bharatiya Janata Party
1985	Rikhi Ram Kaundal	Bharatiya Janata Party
1990	Rikhi Ram Kaundal	Bharatiya Janata Party
1993	Dr. Beeru Ram Kishore	Indian National Congress
1998	Rikhi Ram Kaundal	Bharatiya Janata Party
2003	Dr. Beeru Ram Kishore	Independent politician
2007	Rikhi Ram Kaundal	Bharatiya Janata Party

== Election results ==
=== Assembly Election 2007 ===
2007 Himachal Pradesh Legislative Assembly election: Gehrwin
Party	Candidate	Votes	%	±%
BJP	Rikhi Ram Kaundal	24,411	52.32%	▲8.09
INC	Dr. Beeru Ram Kishore	19,777	42.39%	▲38.64
BSP	Sukh Dev	1,942	4.16%	New
LJP	Rajesh Kumar	513	1.10%	▲0.49
Margin of victory		4,634	9.93%	▲6.49
Turnout		46,656	70.69%	▼6.65
Registered electors		66,003		▲13.14
BJP gain from Independent		Swing	▲4.64	

=== Assembly Election 2003 ===
2003 Himachal Pradesh Legislative Assembly election: Gehrwin
Party	Candidate	Votes	%	±%
Independent	Dr. Beeru Ram Kishore	21,512	47.68%	New
BJP	Rikhi Ram Kaundal	19,958	44.24%	▼5.53
INC	Roop Rani	1,693	3.75%	▼41.69
Independent	Dharminder Kumar	1,680	3.72%	New
LJP	Rajesh Kumar	275	0.61%	New
Margin of victory		1,554	3.44%	▼0.88
Turnout		45,118	77.46%	▲4.41
Registered electors		58,340		▲15.90
Independent gain from BJP		Swing	▼2.08	

=== Assembly Election 1998 ===
1998 Himachal Pradesh Legislative Assembly election: Gehrwin
Party	Candidate	Votes	%	±%
BJP	Rikhi Ram Kaundal	18,268	49.76%	▲11.13
INC	Dr. Beeru Ram Kishore	16,682	45.44%	▼14.39
HVC	Bachiter Singh	1,443	3.93%	New
Margin of victory		1,586	4.32%	▼16.88
Turnout		36,710	73.77%	▼1.02
Registered electors		50,336		▲8.08
BJP gain from INC		Swing		

=== Assembly Election 1993 ===
1993 Himachal Pradesh Legislative Assembly election: Gehrwin
Party	Candidate	Votes	%	±%
INC	Dr. Beeru Ram Kishore	20,604	59.83%	▲15.95
BJP	Kondal Rihi Ram	13,304	38.63%	▼15.34
BSP	Pyar Singh	280	0.81%	New
Margin of victory		7,300	21.20%	▲11.11
Turnout		34,437	74.35%	▲4.47
Registered electors		46,571		▲10.65
INC gain from BJP		Swing		

=== Assembly Election 1990 ===
1990 Himachal Pradesh Legislative Assembly election: Gehrwin
Party	Candidate	Votes	%	±%
BJP	Rikhi Ram Kaundal	15,784	53.97%	▼0.10
INC	Dr. Beeru Ram Kishore	12,833	43.88%	▲1.17
Independent	Shankari Devi Kutal	361	1.23%	New
Margin of victory		2,951	10.09%	▼1.27
Turnout		29,244	70.11%	▼3.31
Registered electors		42,090		▲32.76
BJP hold		Swing		

=== Assembly Election 1985 ===
1985 Himachal Pradesh Legislative Assembly election: Gehrwin
Party	Candidate	Votes	%	±%
BJP	Rikhi Ram Kaundal	12,477	54.07%	▲17.55
INC	Dr. Beeru Ram Kishore	9,856	42.71%	▲17.93
Independent	Bachittar Singh	499	2.16%	New
Independent	Shankari Devi Kutwal	203	0.88%	New
Margin of victory		2,621	11.36%	▲8.54
Turnout		23,076	73.29%	▲5.10
Registered electors		31,704		▲4.80
BJP hold		Swing	▲17.55	

=== Assembly Election 1982 ===
1982 Himachal Pradesh Legislative Assembly election: Gehrwin
Party	Candidate	Votes	%	±%
BJP	Ganu Ram	7,477	36.52%	New
Independent	Rikhi Ram Kaundal	6,901	33.70%	New
INC	Niku Ram	5,074	24.78%	▲7.95
Independent	Ram Prakash	737	3.60%	New
JP	Banta Ram	286	1.40%	▼69.50
Margin of victory		576	2.81%	▼51.26
Turnout		20,475	68.67%	▲13.92
Registered electors		30,251		▲10.18
BJP gain from JP		Swing	▼34.38	

=== Assembly Election 1977 ===
1977 Himachal Pradesh Legislative Assembly election: Gehrwin
Party	Candidate	Votes	%	±%
JP	Bachittar Singh	10,466	70.90%	New
INC	Rikhi Ram Kaundal	2,484	16.83%	▼36.20
Independent	Narain Das	1,812	12.27%	New
Margin of victory		7,982	54.07%	▲44.92
Turnout		14,762	54.39%	▲15.89
Registered electors		27,457		▲10.43
JP gain from INC		Swing		

=== Assembly Election 1972 ===
1972 Himachal Pradesh Legislative Assembly election: Gehrwin
Party	Candidate	Votes	%	±%
INC	Niku Ram	4,994	53.03%	▲5.77
LRP	Bachittar Sigh	4,132	43.87%	New
ABJS	Durga Dass	292	3.10%	▼28.30
Margin of victory		862	9.15%	▼6.71
Turnout		9,418	38.74%	▼5.69
Registered electors		24,864		▼15.88
INC hold		Swing		

=== Assembly Election 1967 ===
1967 Himachal Pradesh Legislative Assembly election: Gehrwin
Party	Candidate	Votes	%	±%
INC	Niku Ram	6,085	47.26%	New
ABJS	R. N. Giri	4,043	31.40%	New
Independent	B. Singh	1,157	8.99%	New
Independent	M. Ram	637	4.95%	New
Independent	Gurdittu	506	3.93%	New
CPI(M)	M. Ram	448	3.48%	New
Margin of victory		2,042	15.86%	
Turnout		12,876	47.06%	
Registered electors		29,557		
INC win (new seat)				
