= Harshwardhan Chauhan =

Indian politician

Cabinet Minister, Government of Himachal Pradesh
- Incumbent
- Assumed office 8 January 2023
- Governor: Rajendra Arlekar (2022–2023); Shiv Pratap Shukla (2023–2026); Kavinder Gupta (2026–present)
- Cabinet: Sukhu ministry
- Chief Minister: Sukhvinder Singh Sukhu
- Ministry and Departments: Industries; Parliamentary Affairs

Member of the Himachal Pradesh Legislative Assembly
- Incumbent
- Assumed office 18 December 2017
- Preceded by: Baldev Singh Tomar
- Constituency: Shillai
- In office 11 September 1993 – 20 December 2012
- Preceded by: Jagat Singh Negi
- Succeeded by: Baldev Singh Tomar
- Constituency: Shillai

Personal details
- Born: 14 September 1964 (age 61) Nahan, Himachal Pradesh, India
- Party: Indian National Congress
- Spouse: Kalpna Chauhan
- Children: Layashree Chauhan
- Parent: Guman Singh Chauhan (father)
- Education: B.A. and L.L.B
- Alma mater: St. Edward's School, Shimla, and HPU, Shimla

Harshwardhan Chauhan (born 14 September 1964) is an Indian politician, who currently serves as Member of Legislative Assembly from Shillai constituency. Harshwardhan Chauhan won from Shillai constituency in 2017 state assembly elections. He is five times Member of Himachal Pradesh Legislative Assembly.

== Early life and family ==
Harshwardhan Chauhan, born on 14 September 1964 in Nahan, District Sirmour, is the son of Late Shri Guman Singh Chauhan, a former Cabinet Minister in the H.P. State Government. He holds a B.A. and L.L.B., having been educated at St. Edward's School, Shimla, and H.P. University, Shimla. Harshwardhan is married to Smt. Kalpana Chauhan, and the couple has one daughter. He is a horticulturist, businessman, and advocate by profession.

== Political engagement ==
Harshwardhan Chauhan has been associated with politics from his college days. He has a long-standing history of involvement with the NSUI and various Congress committees. Notable roles include being the General Secretary of Youth Congress in Shillai from 1986 to 1988, President of D.C.C., Sirmour from 2008 to 2012, and General Secretary of Congress Legislature Party from 2003 to 2007 and Himachal Pradesh Congress Committee from 2005 to 2008 and 2013 to 2018.

== Legislative career ==
Elected to the State Legislative Assembly in 1993, Harshwardhan Chauhan has been re-elected multiple times in 1998, 2003, 2007, and December 2017. He has held various positions, including Vice-Chairman of the State General Industries Corporation from 1995 to 1997 and membership in several boards and committees related to education and horticulture.

As Chief Parliamentary Secretary in the H.P. Government from 18 April to 18 August 2005, Harshwardhan Chauhan chaired significant committees like Estimates, General Development, and Petitions during 2005-2007 & 2008-2012.

Elected for the sixth consecutive term in December 2022, Harshwardhan Chauhan was inducted into the Council of Ministers as the Industries Minister along with portfolios of Parliamentary Affairs & Ayush on 8 January 2023.

== Special interests ==
Harshwardhan Chauhan has a special interest in social service, particularly helping the poor and needy people.

== Favorite pastime ==
His favorite pastimes include reading and music.

== Languages known ==
Fluent in Hindi and English, Harshwardhan Chauhan possesses strong linguistic skills for effective communication.
