= Mewa Assembly constituency =

Former Legislative Assembly constituency in Himachal Pradesh, India

Coordinates: 31.98°N 76.19°E

Mewa
- Former constituency for the Himachal Pradesh Legislative Assembly

Constituency details
- Country: India
- Region: North India
- State: Himachal Pradesh
- District: Hamirpur
- Lok Sabha constituency: Hamirpur
- Abolished: 2012
- Reservation: None

Mewa was one of the 68 constituencies in the Himachal Pradesh Legislative Assembly of Himachal Pradesh a northern state of India. It was also part of Hamirpur, Himachal Pradesh Lok Sabha constituency.

== Members of the Legislative Assembly ==
Year	Member	Party
1967	Amar Singh	Bharatiya Jana Sangh
1972	Dharam Singh	Indian National Congress
1977	Amar Singh Choudhry	Janata Party
1982	Dharam Singh	Indian National Congress
1985	Dharam Singh	Indian National Congress
1990	Ishwar Dass Dhiman	Bharatiya Janata Party
1993	Ishwar Dass Dhiman	Bharatiya Janata Party
1998	Ishwar Dass Dhiman	Bharatiya Janata Party
2003	Ishwar Dass Dhiman	Bharatiya Janata Party
2007	Ishwar Dass Dhiman	Bharatiya Janata Party

== Election results ==
=== Assembly Election 2007 ===
2007 Himachal Pradesh Legislative Assembly election: Mewa
Party	Candidate	Votes	%	±%
BJP	Ishwar Dass Dhiman	24,421	51.91%	▲2.72
INC	Suresh Kumar	14,046	29.86%	▼16.47
Independent	Prem Kaushal	6,836	14.53%	New
BSP	Dr. Lal Singh Mastana	1,227	2.61%	▲1.86
LJP	Ranjeet Kumar	500	1.06%	New
Margin of victory		10,375	22.05%	▲19.18
Turnout		47,044	65.49%	▼8.69
Registered electors		71,833		▲15.09
BJP hold		Swing	▲2.72	

=== Assembly Election 2003 ===
2003 Himachal Pradesh Legislative Assembly election: Mewa
Party	Candidate	Votes	%	±%
BJP	Ishwar Dass Dhiman	22,778	49.19%	▼4.35
INC	Suresh Kumar	21,449	46.32%	▲7.32
Independent	Amin Chand	943	2.04%	New
HVC	Ishwari Devi	588	1.27%	▼2.72
BSP	Dhani Ram Shukla	345	0.75%	▼0.70
Margin of victory		1,329	2.87%	▼11.67
Turnout		46,302	74.19%	▲3.53
Registered electors		62,416		▲18.38
BJP hold		Swing	▼4.35	

=== Assembly Election 1998 ===
1998 Himachal Pradesh Legislative Assembly election: Mewa
Party	Candidate	Votes	%	±%
BJP	Ishwar Dass Dhiman	19,949	53.55%	▲3.91
INC	Prem Kaushal	14,532	39.01%	▼9.33
HVC	Dharam Dass	1,486	3.99%	New
CPI(M)	Braham Dass	750	2.01%	New
BSP	Madan Lal	538	1.44%	▲0.46
Margin of victory		5,417	14.54%	▲13.25
Turnout		37,255	71.28%	▲2.70
Registered electors		52,727		▲3.80
BJP hold		Swing	▲3.91	

=== Assembly Election 1993 ===
1993 Himachal Pradesh Legislative Assembly election: Mewa
Party	Candidate	Votes	%	±%
BJP	Ishwar Dass Dhiman	17,134	49.63%	▼16.02
INC	Neeraj Kumar	16,687	48.34%	▲20.27
BSP	Zulfi Ram	338	0.98%	▼1.23
Margin of victory		447	1.29%	▼36.28
Turnout		34,520	68.41%	▲1.99
Registered electors		50,796		▲5.60
BJP hold		Swing		

=== Assembly Election 1990 ===
1990 Himachal Pradesh Legislative Assembly election: Mewa
Party	Candidate	Votes	%	±%
BJP	Ishwar Dass Dhiman	20,832	65.65%	▲20.31
INC	Dharam Singh	8,908	28.07%	▼24.85
CPI	Mukesh Kumar	934	2.94%	New
BSP	Mehar Singh	700	2.21%	New
Doordarshi Party	Prem Chand	356	1.12%	New
Margin of victory		11,924	37.58%	▲30.00
Turnout		31,730	66.60%	▼3.51
Registered electors		48,101		▲31.63
BJP gain from INC		Swing	▲12.73	

=== Assembly Election 1985 ===
1985 Himachal Pradesh Legislative Assembly election: Mewa
Party	Candidate	Votes	%	±%
INC	Dharam Singh	13,437	52.93%	▲1.40
BJP	Mela Ram	11,512	45.35%	▲2.06
Independent	Om Prakash	296	1.17%	New
Independent	Bhagat Ram	142	0.56%	New
Margin of victory		1,925	7.58%	▼0.66
Turnout		25,387	70.06%	▲4.11
Registered electors		36,542		▲4.18
INC hold		Swing	▲1.40	

=== Assembly Election 1982 ===
1982 Himachal Pradesh Legislative Assembly election: Mewa
Party	Candidate	Votes	%	±%
INC	Dharam Singh	11,814	51.53%	▲6.29
BJP	Amar Singh	9,924	43.29%	New
Independent	Gian Chand	1,059	4.62%	New
Independent	Sita Ram	129	0.56%	New
Margin of victory		1,890	8.24%	▲2.09
Turnout		22,926	66.23%	▲13.04
Registered electors		35,077		▲10.53
INC gain from JP		Swing	▲0.14	

=== Assembly Election 1977 ===
1977 Himachal Pradesh Legislative Assembly election: Mewa
Party	Candidate	Votes	%	±%
JP	Amar Singh Choudhry	8,533	51.39%	New
INC	Dharam Singh	7,512	45.24%	▼7.69
Independent	Mela Ram	558	3.36%	New
Margin of victory		1,021	6.15%	▼16.50
Turnout		16,603	53.16%	▲6.29
Registered electors		31,736		▲7.78
JP gain from INC		Swing		

=== Assembly Election 1972 ===
1972 Himachal Pradesh Legislative Assembly election: Mewa
Party	Candidate	Votes	%	±%
INC	Dharam Singh	7,173	52.93%	▲26.30
Independent	Rup Singh Phul	4,104	30.29%	New
ABJS	Amar Singh	2,274	16.78%	▼44.30
Margin of victory		3,069	22.65%	▼11.80
Turnout		13,551	47.60%	▲3.07
Registered electors		29,445		▲11.41
INC gain from ABJS		Swing		

=== Assembly Election 1967 ===
1967 Himachal Pradesh Legislative Assembly election: Mewa
Party	Candidate	Votes	%	±%
ABJS	Amar Singh	6,933	61.08%	New
INC	R. Phul	3,023	26.63%	New
Republic Party Of India	M. Ram	1,395	12.29%	New
Margin of victory		3,910	34.45%	
Turnout		11,351	45.97%	
Registered electors		26,430		
ABJS win (new seat)				

== See also ==
- Hamirpur district, Himachal Pradesh
- List of constituencies of Himachal Pradesh Legislative Assembly
