= 2011 elections in India =

Elections in India
- 2011

Parliament By-elections took place between May and November to elect Lok Sabha members in the states of Andhra Pradesh, Chhattisgarh, Haryana, Jharkhand and West Bengal.

Legislative Assembly elections took place in April and May 2011 to elect legislatures in the Indian states of Assam, Kerala, Tamil Nadu, West Bengal and Puducherry.

== Legislative assembly elections ==
Date(s)	State/UT	Government Before	Chief Minister before election	Government After	Elected Chief Minister	Maps
4 and 11 April 2011	Assam	Indian National Congress	Tarun Gogoi	Indian National Congress	Tarun Gogoi	
4 and 11 April 2011	Assam	Bodoland People's Front	Tarun Gogoi	Bodoland People's Front	Tarun Gogoi	
13 April 2011	Kerala	Communist Party of India (Marxist)	V. S. Achuthanandan	Indian National Congress	Oommen Chandy	
13 April 2011	Puducherry	Indian National Congress	V. Vaithilingam	All India N. R. Congress	N. Rangaswamy	
13 April 2011	Puducherry	Dravida Munnetra Kazhagam	V. Vaithilingam	All India N. R. Congress	N. Rangaswamy	
13 April 2011	Tamil Nadu	Dravida Munnetra Kazhagam	M. Karunanidhi	All India Anna Dravida Munnetra Kazhagam	J. Jayalalithaa	
13 April 2011	Tamil Nadu	Indian National Congress	M. Karunanidhi	Communist Party of India (Marxist)	J. Jayalalithaa	
13 April 2011	Tamil Nadu	Pattali Makkal Katchi	M. Karunanidhi	Communist Party of India	J. Jayalalithaa	
18 April-10 May 2011	West Bengal	Communist Party of India (Marxist)	Buddhadeb Bhattacharjee	All India Trinamool Congress	Mamata Banerjee	
18 April-10 May 2011	West Bengal	Communist Party of India (Marxist)	Buddhadeb Bhattacharjee	Indian National Congress	Mamata Banerjee	

== Parliamentary by-election ==
S.No	Date	Constituency	State	MP before election	Party before election	Elected MP	Party after election
38	8 May 2011	Kadapa	Andhra Pradesh	Y. S. Jagan Mohan Reddy	Indian National Congress	Y. S. Jagan Mohan Reddy	YSR Congress Party
10	8 May 2011	Bastar	Chhattisgarh	Baliram Kashyap	Bharatiya Janata Party	Dinesh Kashyap	Bharatiya Janata Party
9	26 September 2011	Jamshedpur	Jharkhand	Arjun Munda	Bharatiya Janata Party	Ajoy Kumar	Jharkhand Vikas Morcha
4	13 October 2011	Hisar	Haryana	Bhajan Lal Bishnoi	Haryana Janhit Congress	Kuldeep Bishnoi	Haryana Janhit Congress
23	30 November 2011	Kolkata Dakshin	West Bengal	Mamata Banerjee	All India Trinamool Congress	Subrata Bakshi	All India Trinamool Congress

== Assembly by-elections ==
=== Andhra Pradesh ===
S.No	Date	Constituency	MLA before election	Party before election	Elected MLA	Party after election
248	8 May 2011	Pulivendla	Y. S. Vijayamma	Indian National Congress	Y. S. Vijayamma	YSR Congress Party
14	13 October 2011	Banswada	Pocharam Srinivas Reddy	Telugu Desam Party	Pocharam Srinivas Reddy	Telangana Rashtra Samithi

=== Arunachal Pradesh ===
S.No	Date	Constituency	MLA before election	Party before election	Elected MLA	Party after election
3	30 May 2011	Mukto	Dorjee Khandu	Indian National Congress	Pema Khandu	Indian National Congress

=== Bihar ===
S.No	Date	Constituency	MLA before election	Party before election	Elected MLA	Party after election
62	25 June 2011	Purnia	Raj Kishore Kesri	Bharatiya Janata Party	Kiran Devi	Bharatiya Janata Party

=== Chhattisgarh ===
S.No	Date	Constituency	MLA before election	Party before election	Elected MLA	Party after election
59	14 February 2011	Sanjari Balod	Madanlal Sahu	Bharatiya Janata Party	Kumari Bai Sahu	Bharatiya Janata Party

=== Gujarat ===
S.No	Date	Constituency	MLA before election	Party before election	Elected MLA	Party after election
75	14 February 2011	Khadia	Ashok Bhatt	Bharatiya Janata Party	Bhushan Bhatt	Bharatiya Janata Party

=== Haryana ===
S.No	Date	Constituency	MLA before election	Party before election	Elected MLA	Party after election
41	30 November 2011	Ratia	Gian Chand	Indian National Lok Dal	Jarnail Singh	Indian National Congress
47	30 November 2011	Adampur	Kuldeep Bishnoi	Haryana Janhit Congress	Renuka Bishnoi	Haryana Janhit Congress

=== Himachal Pradesh ===
S.No	Date	Constituency	MLA before election	Party before election	Elected MLA	Party after election
12	30 November 2011	Nalagarh	Hari Naraian Singh	Bharatiya Janata Party	Lakhvinder Singh Rana	Indian National Congress
16	30 November 2011	Rainka	Prem Singh	Indian National Congress	Hirdaya Ram	Bharatiya Janata Party

=== Jharkhand ===
S.No	Date	Constituency	MLA before election	Party before election	Elected MLA	Party after election
57	10 February 2011	Kharsawan	Mangal Singh Soy	Bharatiya Janata Party	Arjun Munda	Bharatiya Janata Party
24	30 November 2011	Mandu	Tek Lal Mahto	Jharkhand Mukti Morcha	Jai Prakash Bhai Patel	Jharkhand Mukti Morcha

=== Karnataka ===
S.No	Date	Constituency	MLA before election	Party before election	Elected MLA	Party after election
103	9 April 2011	Jagalur	S. V. Ramachandra	Indian National Congress	S. V. Ramachandra	Bharatiya Janata Party
147	9 April 2011	Bangarapet	M Narayanaswamy	Indian National Congress	M Narayanaswamy	Bharatiya Janata Party
185	9 April 2011	Channapatna	M.C. Ashwath	Janata Dal (Secular)	C. P. Yogeshwara	Bharatiya Janata Party
64	26 September 2011	Koppal	Karadi Sanganna Amarappa	Janata Dal (Secular)	Karadi Sanganna Amarappa	Bharatiya Janata Party
93	30 November 2011	Bellary Rural	B. Sriramulu	Bharatiya Janata Party	B. Sriramulu	Independent

=== Madhya Pradesh ===
S.No	Date	Constituency	MLA before election	Party before election	Elected MLA	Party after election
170	14 February 2011	Sonkatch	Sajjan Singh Verma	Indian National Congress	Rajendra Pholchand Verma	Bharatiya Janata Party
198	14 February 2011	Kukshi	Jamuna Devi	Indian National Congress	Mukam Singh Kirade	Bharatiya Janata Party
56	25 June 2011	Jabera	Ratnesh Soloman	Indian National Congress	Dashrath Singh Lodhi	Bharatiya Janata Party

=== Maharashtra ===
S.No	Date	Constituency	MLA before election	Party before election	Elected MLA	Party after election
211	13 October 2011	Khadakwasala	Ramesh Wanjale	Maharashtra Navnirman Sena	Bhimrao Tapkir	Bharatiya Janata Party

=== Nagaland ===
S.No	Date	Constituency	MLA before election	Party before election	Elected MLA	Party after election
26	7 May 2011	Aonglenden	Nungshizenba Longkumer	Indian National Congress	Toshipokba	Naga People's Front

=== Odisha ===
S.No	Date	Constituency	MLA before election	Party before election	Elected MLA	Party after election
73	30 May 2011	Umerkote	Jagabandhu Majhi	Biju Janata Dal	Subash Gond	Biju Janata Dal

=== Puducherry ===
S.No	Date	Constituency	MLA before election	Party before election	Elected MLA	Party after election
8	10 October 2011	Indira Nagar	N. Rangaswamy	All India N.R. Congress	A.T. Selvane	All India N.R. Congress

=== Tamil Nadu ===
S.No	Date	Constituency	MLA before election	Party before election	Elected MLA	Party after election
140	13 October 2011	Tiruchirappalli West	M. Mariam Pichai	All India Anna Dravida Munnetra Kazhagam	M. Paranjothi	All India Anna Dravida Munnetra Kazhagam

=== Uttar Pradesh ===
S.No	Date	Constituency	MLA before election	Party before election	Elected MLA	Party after election
168	8 May 2011	Pipraich	Jamuna Nishad	Bahujan Samaj Party	Rajmati Nishad	Samajwadi Party

=== West Bengal ===
S.No	Date	Constituency	MLA before election	Party before election	Elected MLA	Party after election
125	25 September 2011	Basirhat Uttar	Mostafa Bin Qaseem	Communist Party of India	ATM Abdullah	All India Trinamool Congress
159	25 September 2011	Bhabanipur	Subrata Bakshi	All India Trinamool Congress	Mamata Banerjee	All India Trinamool Congress

== See also ==
- S. Y. Quraishi
