= First Shanta Kumar ministry =

Government of Himachal Pradesh led by Shanta Kumar, 1977–1980

Shanta Kumar ministry
- Ministry of Himachal Pradesh
- Date formed: 22 June 1977
- Date dissolved: 14 February 1980

People and organisations
- Chief Minister: Shanta Kumar
- Total no. of members: 8
- Member parties: Janata Party

History
- Predecessor: President's rule
- Successor: Thakur Ram Lal ministry

The Shanta Kumar ministry (1977–1980) was the Government of Himachal Pradesh headed by Chief Minister Shanta Kumar following the 1977 legislative assembly election. This was his first tenure as Chief Minister. The ministry remained in office from 22 June 1977 to 14 February 1980.

== Council of Ministers ==
Name	Office	Portfolio	Took Office	Left Office	Party
Shanta Kumar	Chief Minister	General Administration, including Confidential and Cabinet, Parliamentary Affairs and Border; Home and Personnel, including Appointment, Secretariat Administration, Administrative Reforms and Vigilance; Planning; Finance, including Treasuries, Economic Affairs and Local Audit; Public Relations; University Education	22 June 1977	14 February 1980	Janata Party
Kishori Lal	Cabinet Minister; Public Works Minister	Public Works; Multi-purpose Projects; Power; Tourism; Health and Family Welfare; Ayurveda; Irrigation	22 June 1977	14 February 1980	Janata Party
Jagdev Chand	Cabinet Minister; Revenue Minister	Revenue; Excise and Taxation; Transport; Elections; Welfare	22 June 1977	14 February 1980	Janata Party
Daulat Ram Chauhan	Cabinet Minister; Education Minister	Industries; Labour; Employment and Training; Education; Technical Education; Local Self-Government; Arts, Language and Culture; Horticulture	22 June 1977	14 February 1980	Janata Party
Devi Singh	Cabinet Minister; Forest Minister	Forest; Farming and Environmental Conservation; Rural Integrated Development; Tribal Development; Co-operation; Prisons	22 June 1977	14 February 1980	Janata Party
Bachittar Singh	Cabinet Minister; Agriculture Minister	Agriculture; Animal Husbandry; Fisheries; Housing	22 June 1977	14 February 1980	Janata Party
Roop Singh	Minister of State for Panchayats	Panchayats; Parliamentary Affairs, attached with the Chief Minister; Welfare, attached with the Revenue Minister; Prisons, attached with the Forest Minister	22 June 1977	14 February 1980	Janata Party
Shyama Sharma	Minister of State for Food and Supplies	Food and Supplies; Law	22 June 1977	14 February 1980	Janata Party

== See also ==
- Shanta Kumar ministry (1990–92)
- List of chief ministers of Himachal Pradesh
