= Trilok Jamwal =

Indian politician

Trilok Jamwal (born 1974) is an Indian politician from Himachal Pradesh. He is a member of the Himachal Pradesh Legislative Assembly from Bilaspur Assembly constituency in Bilaspur district. He won the 2022 Himachal Pradesh Legislative Assembly election representing the Bharatiya Janata Party.

== Early life and education ==
Jamwal is from Bilaspur, Himachal Pradesh. He is the son of Bhup Chand Jamwal. He completed his MCom in 1997 at Himachal Pradesh University.

== Career ==
Jamwal won from Bilaspur Assembly constituency representing the Bharatiya Janata Party in the 2022 Himachal Pradesh Legislative Assembly election. He polled 30,988 votes and defeated his nearest rival, Bumber Thakur of the Indian National Congress, by a margin of 276 votes.
