= Baldev Singh Tomar =

Indian politician

Baldev Singh Tomar (born 10 December 1970 in Shillai, Sirmour district) is an Indian politician and member of the Bharatiya Janata Party. Tomar is a former member of the Himachal Pradesh Legislative Assembly from the Shillai constituency in Sirmaur district.
