= J. P. Nadda =

Indian lawyer and politician (born 1960)

- Nadda in 2026

28th Leader of the House in Rajya Sabha
- Incumbent
- Assumed office 24 June 2024
- Deputy: Nirmala Sitharaman
- Chairman: Jagdeep Dhankhar; C. P. Radhakrishnan
- Preceded by: Piyush Goyal

25th Union Minister of Chemicals & Fertilisers
- Incumbent
- Assumed office 9 June 2024
- President: Droupadi Murmu
- Prime Minister: Narendra Modi
- Preceded by: Mansukh L. Mandaviya

34th Union Minister of Health & Family Welfare
- Incumbent
- Assumed office 9 June 2024
- President: Droupadi Murmu
- Prime Minister: Narendra Modi
- Preceded by: Mansukh L. Mandaviya
- In office 9 November 2014 – 30 May 2019
- President: Ramnath Kovind; Pranab Mukherjee
- Prime Minister: Narendra Modi
- Preceded by: Harsh Vardhan
- Succeeded by: Harsh Vardhan

10th National President of the Bharatiya Janata Party
- In office 20 January 2020 – 20 January 2026
- Preceded by: Amit Shah
- Succeeded by: Nitin Nabin
- Working; 17 June 2019 – 20 January 2020
- Preceded by: Office established
- Succeeded by: Nitin Nabin (2025)

Member of Parliament, Rajya Sabha
- Incumbent
- Assumed office 3 April 2024
- Preceded by: Parshottam Rupala
- Constituency: Gujarat
- In office 3 April 2012 – 2 April 2024
- Preceded by: Viplove Thakur
- Succeeded by: Harsh Mahajan
- Constituency: Himachal Pradesh

Cabinet Minister in Himachal Pradesh
- In office 30 December 2007 – 25 December 2012
- Governor: V. S. Kokje; Prabha Rau; Urmila Singh
- Chief Minister: Prem Kumar Dhumal
- Ministries: • Forest; • Environment; • Science and Technology
- In office 24 March 1998 – 5 March 2003
- Governor: V. S. Rama Devi; Vishnu Kant Shastri; Suraj Bhan
- Chief Minister: Prem Kumar Dhumal
- Ministries: • Health and Family Welfare; • Legislative Affairs

Member of Himachal Pradesh Legislative Assembly
- In office 2007 – 2012
- Preceded by: Tilak Raj Sharma
- Succeeded by: Bumber Thakur
- Constituency: Bilaspur
- In office 1993 – 2003
- Preceded by: Sada Ram Thakur
- Succeeded by: Tilak Raj Sharma
- Constituency: Bilaspur

Personal details
- Born: Jagat Prakash Nadda; 2 December 1960 (age 65) Patna, Bihar, India
- Party: Bharatiya Janata Party
- Spouse: Mallika Banerjee (m. 1991)
- Children: 2
- Relatives: Jayashree Banerjee (mother-in-law)
- Education: Patna College (BA); Himachal Pradesh University (LLB)
- Website: jagatprakashnadda.in

Jagat Prakash Nadda (born 2 December 1960) is an Indian lawyer and politician who is serving as the 34th Minister of Health, 25th Minister of Chemicals and Fertilizers since 2024 and served as the 10th national president of the Bharatiya Janata Party (BJP) from 2020 to 2026. He is also the member of the Rajya Sabha representing Gujarat since 2024. Nadda was also the Minister of Health and Family Welfare in the first Modi ministry from 2014 to 2019

Previously, he was an MLA from Bilaspur from 2007 to 2012 and from 1993 to 2003 and Minister of Forest, Environment, Science, and Technology from 2007 to 2012 and the Minister of Health and Family Welfare and Parliamentary Affairs from 1998 to 2003 in the Himachal Pradesh Government.

== Early and personal life ==
J. P. Nadda was born in Patna, Bihar on 2 December 1960, to Narain Lall Nadda and Krishna Nadda, with roots in Himachal Pradesh. His family hails from the Brahmin community. He has a brother named Jagat Bhushan Nadda.

Nadda was educated at St. Xavier's School, Patna. He then did his B.A. degree at Patna College and LL.B. from the Faculty of Law, Himachal Pradesh University, Shimla. As a child, he represented Bihar in the All India Junior Swimming Championship held at Delhi.

Nadda married Mallika Nadda (née Banerjee) on 11 December 1991, with whom he has two sons. His mother-in-law, Jayashree Banerjee, was elected to Lok Sabha in 1999.

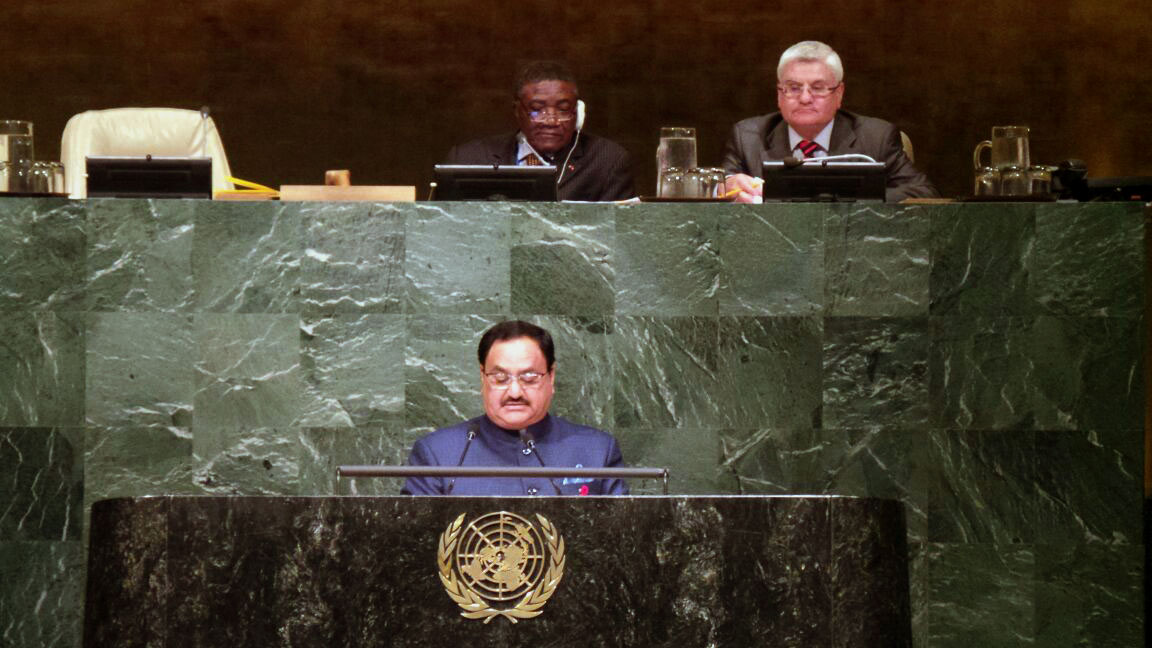
Nadda as the Union Minister for Health & Family Welfare, addressing the UNGA High Level Meeting on HIV-AIDS, in New York on 8 June 2016

== Early political career ==
Nadda was first elected to the Himachal Pradesh Legislative Assembly in the election of 1993 from Bilaspur. He was re-elected in 1998.

During his first term, he served as the Leader of his party group in the Himachal Pradesh Legislative Assembly from 1994 to 1998. He was the Minister of Health and Family Welfare and Parliamentary Affairs in First Dhumal ministry. Nadda lost his seat in the 2003 Himachal Pradesh Legislative Assembly election.

Nadda was elected for another term in the 2007 elections. After Prem Kumar Dhumal formed a government, he inducted Nadda into his cabinet, as a cabinet minister responsible for Forest, Environment, Science and Technology, from 2008 to 2010.

Nadda did not seek re-election to the Legislative Assembly in 2012, and instead got elected to Rajya Sabha, Indian Parliament's upper chamber from Himachal Pradesh.

=== First Modi ministry ===
Sanjiv Chaturvedi was posted in AIIMS, Delhi as Chief Vigilance Officer (CVO) from 2012 to 2014. During his tenure, he was investigating some high-level corruption in the prime institute. As a result of Chaturvedi's investigations, the Central Bureau of Investigation (CBI) registered cases and recommended action against Vineet Chawdhry, a close aide to Nadda. In 2014, Nadda wrote multiple letters to the then Union Health Minister, Harsh Vardhan, to put the investigations on hold and to remove Chaturvedi from the post of CVO.

In November 2014, during a cabinet reshuffle, Prime Minister Narendra Modi made Nadda the Minister of Health. The reshuffle move was described by a section of media as surprising and something which raised questions on Modi's stance on corruption. On 25 February 2015, the Delhi High Court issued a notice to Nadda questioning his role in corruption cases at AIIMS. He was frontrunner for BJP Himachal's Chief Minister but his rival Jai Ram Thakur won the post.

According to a June 2017 India Today investigative report, Nadda was found to have suppressed an investigation of what the report called a ₹7,000 crore scam. The India Today reports included reports from the CBI and a parliamentary committee.

== President of the Bharatiya Janata Party (2020–2026) ==
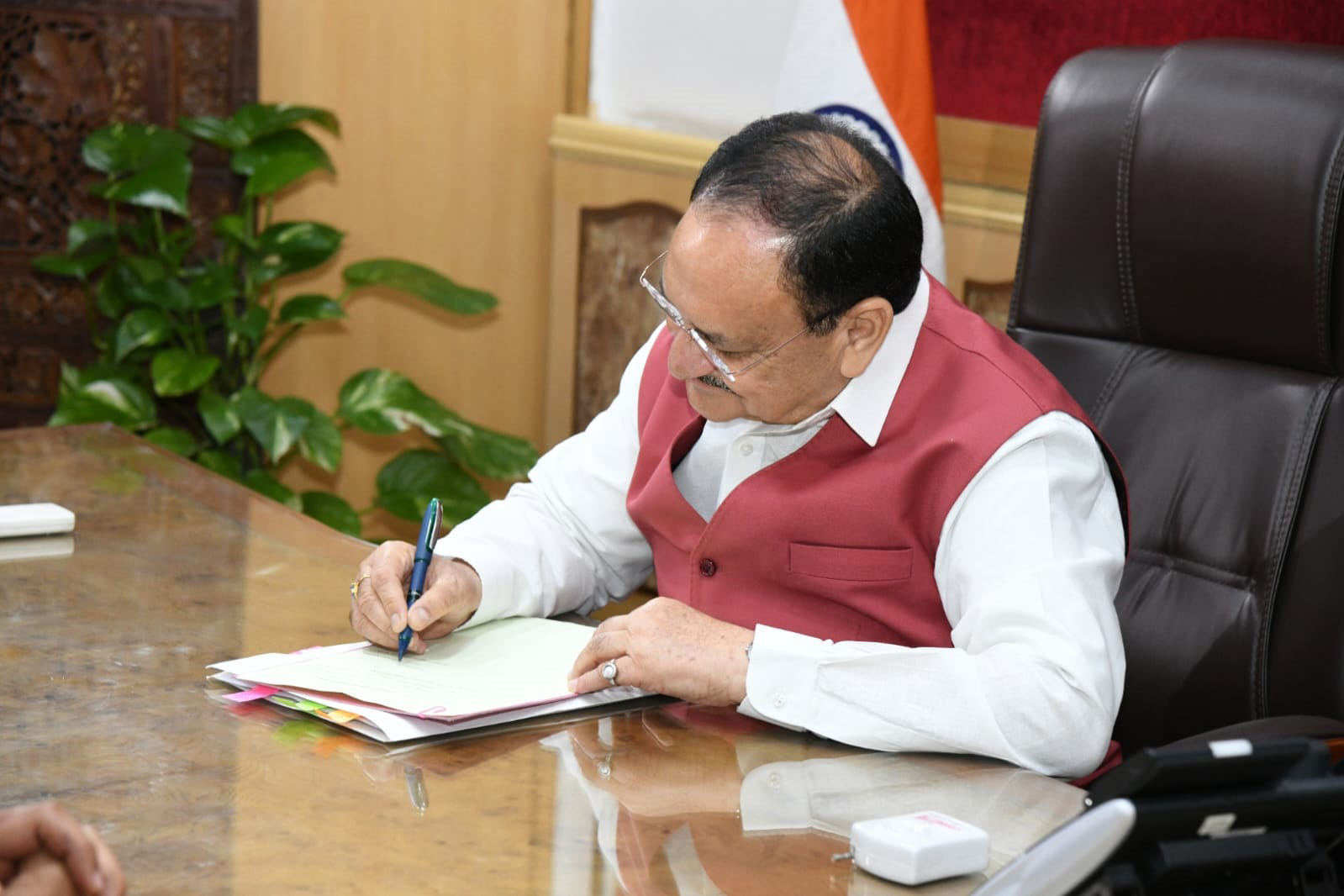
Nadda assuming charge as the Union Minister of Health and Family Welfare

Nadda was appointed the national working president of the BJP in June 2019. On 20 January 2020, he was elected unanimously as the BJP National President, a role he took from Amit Shah.

In January 2021 in Bardhaman, West Bengal, Nadda started a new scheme Ek Muthi Chaawal Yojana. In September 2022 he got extension to be the party chief until 2024 Lok Sabha polls.

On 4 March 2024, he resigned as member of Rajya Sabha from Himachal Pradesh. He was elected unopposed to the Rajya Sabha from Gujarat and took oath on 6 April 2024.

=== Third Modi ministry ===
On 9 June 2024, Nadda took the dual-charge of Ministry of Health and Family Welfare as well as Ministry of Chemicals and Fertilizers.

Government offices
Preceded by Harsh Vardhan	Minister of Health and Family Welfare; 9 November 2014 – 30 May 2019	Succeeded by Harsh Vardhan
Preceded by Mansukh Mandaviya	Minister of Health and Family Welfare and Minister of Chemicals and Fertilizers; 10 June 2024 – present	Incumbent
Succeeded by
Party political offices
Preceded by Amit Shah	President of Bharatiya Janata Party; 20 January 2020 – 20 January 2026	Succeeded by Nitin Nabin
