= Lakhvinder Singh Rana =

Indian politician (born 1968)

Member of the Himachal Pradesh Legislative Assembly
- In office 2017–2022
- Preceded by: Krishan Lal Thakur
- Succeeded by: Krishan Lal Thakur
- Constituency: Nalagarh
- In office 2011–2012
- Preceded by: Hari Naraian Singh
- Succeeded by: Krishan Lal Thakur
- Constituency: Nalagarh

Personal details
- Born: 13 June 1968 (age 58) Nalagarh, Himachal Pradesh, India
- Party: Bharatiya Janata Party (until 2005, 2022–present)
- Other political affiliations: Indian National Congress (2005–2022)
- Spouse: Sunita Rana
- Children: 2
- Education: Himachal Pradesh University (BA)

Lakhvinder Singh Rana (born 13 June 1968) is an Indian businessman and politician who has served in the Himachal Pradesh Legislative Assembly for two non-consecutive terms, representing the Nalagarh Assembly constituency from 2011 to 2012 and since 2017. Originally elected as a member of the Indian National Congress, Rana defected to the Bharatiya Janata Party in August 2022.

== Early life and career ==
Rana was born on 13 June 1968 in the village of Joghon, Nalagarh in Himachal Pradesh. Rana attended the Govt. Degree College Nalagarh and Himachal Pradesh University, graduating with a Bachelor of Arts degree in 1988. In 1992, Rana became the director of the Himachal Pradesh Cooperative and Rural Development Bank, serving until 1997. The following year, he became a board member of the Himachal Pradesh Small Saving Bank, holding that position until 2003.

== Political career ==
Rana's political career began in 1990, when he began serving in his local panchayat samiti as a member of the Bharatiya Janata Party, later also serving in the Solan district's Zila Parishad. From 1996 to 1997, Rana was a member of Akhil Bharatiya Vidyarthi Parishad, a right-wing student organisation. In 1997, Rana became the state president of the Bharatiya Janata Yuva Morcha, serving until 1998, when he became the president of the Nalagarh BJP. From 2000 until 2003, Rana was the BJP district president in the Solan district.

In 2005, Rana left the BJP and switched his party affiliation to the Indian National Congress. In the 2007 Himachal Pradesh Legislative Assembly election, Rana stood as a candidate for the Himachal Pradesh Legislative Assembly, running as the INC nominee for the Nalagarh Assembly constituency, which was a BJP stronghold. Rana was defeated by BJP incumbent Hari Naraian Singh, receiving 25,108 votes compared to Singh's 28,929. In 2008, he served as the INC spokesman for the Solan district, and from 2008 until 2022, he served as a member of the Himachal Congress Executive Committee. He also served as the vice president of the state party.

=== Tenure in the legislative assembly ===
Following Singh's death in office in 2011, Rana stood as a candidate in the by-election to replace him. Rana narrowly defeated Gurnam Kaur of the BJP, receiving 28,799 votes compared to Kaur's 27,200. The following year, Rana ran for a full term in the 2012 Himachal Pradesh Legislative Assembly election; however, he was defeated by BJP nominee Krishan Lal Thakur, receiving 26,033 votes compared to Thakur's 35,341. In the 2017 Himachal Pradesh Legislative Assembly election, Rana narrowly defeated Thakur in a rematch, receiving 25,872 votes compared to Thakur's 24,630.

During his tenure in the legislative assembly, Rana has advocated for the improvement of infrastructure in Nalagarh, which is an industrial hub. Rana has supported the re-opening an old colonial-era railway line that connects to Nalagarh from the town of Ghanauli in Punjab, and has claimed that the state has not sufficiently incentivized industrialists to operate in the area.

On 17 August 2022, Rana and Pawan Kumar Kajal, the working president of the state party, both defected and joined the BJP. The following day, the pair were officially expelled from the INC and were barred from re-joining for six years. The defection of the two senior Congress officials was deemed to be a major blow to the party just a few months prior to the 2022 Himachal Pradesh Legislative Assembly election.

== Electoral performance ==
2007 Himachal Pradesh Legislative Assembly election: Nalagarh
Party	Candidate	Votes	%	±%
BJP	Hari Naraian Singh	28,929	50.84%	▲8.61
INC	Lakhvinder Singh Rana	25,108	44.12%	▲7.59
BSP	Vinod Thakur	1,233	2.17%	New
SP	Gurnam Singh	1,024	1.80%	New
LJP	Chaudhary Gurbakhsh Singh	565	0.99%	New
Margin of victory		3,821	6.71%	▲1.03
Turnout		56,905	83.18%	▼2.71
Registered electors		68,414		▲8.38
BJP hold		Swing	▲8.61	

2011 Himachal Pradesh Legislative Assembly by-election: Nalagarh
Party	Candidate	Votes	%	±%
INC	Lakhvinder Singh Rana	28,799	51.43%	▲7.31
BJP	Gurnam Kaur	27,200	48.57%	▼2.27
Margin of victory		1,599	2.86%	▼3.86
Turnout		55,999	82.62%	▼0.56
Registered electors		67,780		▼0.93
INC gain from BJP		Swing		

2012 Himachal Pradesh Legislative Assembly election: Nalagarh
Party	Candidate	Votes	%	±%
BJP	Krishan Lal Thakur	35,341	55.60%	▲7.03
INC	Lakhvinder Singh Rana	26,033	40.96%	▼10.47
BSP	Anant Ram	610	0.96%	New
SP	Gurnam Singh	597	0.94%	New
HLC	Pola Ram Dhang Wala	537	0.84%	New
LJP	Gurbax Singh Chauhan	380	0.60%	New
Margin of victory		9,308	14.64%	▲11.79
Turnout		63,563	85.59%	▲2.97
Registered electors		74,262		▲9.56
BJP gain from INC		Swing	▲4.17	

2017 Himachal Pradesh Legislative Assembly election: Nalagarh
Party	Candidate	Votes	%	±%
INC	Lakhvinder Singh Rana	25,872	36.30%	▼4.66
BJP	Krishan Lal Thakur	24,630	34.55%	▼21.05
Independent	Hardeep Singh Bawa	13,095	18.37%	New
Independent	Harpreet Singh Saini	5,443	7.64%	New
NOTA	None of the Above	678	0.95%	New
Independent	Gurnam Singh	613	0.86%	New
Margin of victory		1,242	1.74%	▼12.90
Turnout		71,281	86.19%	▲0.60
Registered electors		82,701		▲11.36
INC gain from BJP		Swing	▼19.30	

2022 Himachal Pradesh Legislative Assembly election: Nalagarh
Party	Candidate	Votes	%	±%
Independent	Krishan Lal Thakur	33,427	44.51%	New
INC	Hardeep Singh Bawa	20,163	26.85%	▼9.45
BJP	Lakhvinder Singh Rana	17,273	23.00%	▼11.55
Rashtriya Devbhumi Party	Jagdish Chand	1,146	1.53%	New
AAP	Dharam Pal	1,108	1.48%	New
NOTA	Nota	590	0.79%	▼0.17
BSP	Paras Bains	555	0.74%	New
Independent	Jagpal Singh Rana	534	0.71%	New
Margin of victory		13,264	17.66%	▲15.92
Turnout		75,101	81.67%	▼4.52
Registered electors		91,955		▲11.19
Independent gain from INC		Swing	▲8.21	
