= Krishan Kumar Kaushal =

Indian politician

Krishan Kumar Kaushal was an Indian politician and leader of Communist Party of India from Himachal Pradesh. He represented Kotkehloor constituency from 1990 to 1993.
