= Sri Naina Deviji Assembly constituency =

Legislative Assembly constituency in Himachal Pradesh State, India

Coordinates: 31.64°N 76.82°E

Sri Naina Deviji
- Constituency No. 49 for the Himachal Pradesh Legislative Assembly

Constituency details
- Country: India
- Region: North India
- State: Himachal Pradesh
- District: Bilaspur
- Lok Sabha constituency: Hamirpur
- Established: 2008
- Total electors: 75,176
- Reservation: None

Member of Legislative Assembly
- 14th Himachal Pradesh Legislative Assembly
- Incumbent Randhir Sharma
- Party: Bhartiya Janta Party
- Elected year: 2022

Sri Naina Deviji Assembly constituency is one of the 68 constituencies in the Himachal Pradesh Legislative Assembly of Himachal Pradesh a northern state of India. Naina Devi is also part of Hamirpur, Himachal Pradesh Lok Sabha constituency.

== Members of the Legislative Assembly ==
Year	Member	Picture	Party
2012	Randhir Sharma		Bharatiya Janata Party
2017	Ram Lal Thakur		Indian National Congress
2022	Randhir Sharma		Bhartiya Janata Party

== Election results ==
=== Assembly Election 2022 ===
2022 Himachal Pradesh Legislative Assembly election: Sri Naina Deviji
Party	Candidate	Votes	%	±%
BJP	Randhir Sharma	29,403	47.23%	▲0.10
INC	Ram Lal Thakur	29,232	46.96%	▼1.99
Rashtriya Devbhumi Party	Deepak Kumar	2,114	3.40%	New
AAP	Narinder Singh	653	1.05%	New
CPI	Bhag Singh	627	1.01%	New
NOTA	Nota	225	0.36%	▼0.47
Margin of victory		171	0.27%	▼1.54
Turnout		62,254	82.81%	▼1.97
Registered electors		75,176		▲10.94
BJP gain from INC		Swing	▼1.71	

=== Assembly Election 2017 ===
2017 Himachal Pradesh Legislative Assembly election: Sri Naina Deviji
Party	Candidate	Votes	%	±%
INC	Ram Lal Thakur	28,119	48.94%	▲3.11
BJP	Randhir Sharma	27,077	47.13%	▼1.44
NOTA	None of the Above	477	0.83%	New
Independent	Ramesh Chand	382	0.66%	New
AIFB	Balak Ram Sharma	357	0.62%	New
Independent	Sukh Ram Thakur	314	0.55%	New
Margin of victory		1,042	1.81%	▼0.92
Turnout		57,452	84.78%	▲2.41
Registered electors		67,763		▲10.22
INC gain from BJP		Swing	▲0.37	

=== Assembly Election 2012 ===
2012 Himachal Pradesh Legislative Assembly election: Sri Naina Deviji
Party	Candidate	Votes	%	±%
BJP	Randhir Sharma	24,598	48.57%	New
INC	Ram Lal Thakur	23,213	45.84%	New
CPI	Krishan Kumar	1,117	2.21%	New
Independent	Hoshiar Singh	805	1.59%	New
Independent	Puran Chand Bhatia	508	1.00%	New
BSP	Bhola Ram	340	0.67%	New
Margin of victory		1,385	2.73%	
Turnout		50,642	82.38%	
Registered electors		61,477		
BJP win (new seat)				

== See also ==
- Naina Devi
- Bilaspur district, Himachal Pradesh
- List of constituencies of Himachal Pradesh Legislative Assembly
