= Nalagarh Assembly constituency =

Legislative Assembly constituency in Himachal Pradesh State, India

Coordinates: 31.04°N 76.7°E

Nalagarh
- Constituency No. 51 for the Himachal Pradesh Legislative Assembly

Constituency details
- Country: India
- Region: North India
- State: Himachal Pradesh
- District: Solan
- Lok Sabha constituency: Shimla
- Established: 1967
- Total electors: 91,955
- Reservation: None

Member of Legislative Assembly
- 14th Himachal Pradesh Legislative Assembly
- Incumbent Hardeep Singh Bawa
- Party: Indian National Congress
- Elected year: 2024

Nalagarh Assembly constituency is one of the 68 assembly constituencies of Himachal Pradesh a northern Indian state. Nalagarh is also part of Shimla Lok Sabha constituency.

== Members of the Legislative Assembly ==
Year	Member	Party
1967	Arjan Singh	Indian National Congress
1972	Arjan Singh	Indian National Congress
1977	Vijayander Singh	Janata Party
1982	Vijayander Singh	Indian National Congress
1985	Vijayander Singh	Indian National Congress
1990	Vijayander Singh	Indian National Congress
1993	Vijayander Singh	Indian National Congress
1998	Hari Naraian Singh Saini	Bharatiya Janata Party
2003	Hari Naraian Singh Saini	Bharatiya Janata Party
2007	Hari Naraian Singh Saini	Bharatiya Janata Party
2011★	Lakhvinder Singh Rana	Indian National Congress
2012	Krishan Lal Thakur	Bharatiya Janata Party
2017	Lakhvinder Singh Rana	Indian National Congress
2022	Krishan Lal Thakur	Independent
2024★	Hardeep Singh Bawa	Indian National Congress

★: By-election

== Election results ==
=== 2024 by-election ===
Himachal Pradesh Legislative Assembly by-election 2024: Nalagarh
Party	Candidate	Votes	%	±%
INC	Hardeep Singh Bawa	34608	46.43	▲19.58
BJP	Krishan Lal Thakur	25618	34.37	▲11.37
Independent	Harpreet Saini	13025	17.47	NA
Swabhiman Party	K.L. Sharma	492	0.66	NA
NOTA	None of the Above	446	0.6	▼00.19
Independent	Vijay Singh	353	0.47	NA
Majority		8990	12.06	▼05.60
Turnout		74542	78.82	▼02.85
INC gain from Independent		Swing	▲1.92	

=== Assembly Election 2022 ===
2022 Himachal Pradesh Legislative Assembly election: Nalagarh
Party	Candidate	Votes	%	±%
Independent	Krishan Lal Thakur	33,427	44.51%	New
INC	Hardeep Singh Bawa	20,163	26.85%	▼9.45
BJP	Lakhvinder Singh Rana	17,273	23.00%	▼11.55
Rashtriya Devbhumi Party	Jagdish Chand	1,146	1.53%	New
AAP	Dharam Pal	1,108	1.48%	New
NOTA	Nota	590	0.79%	▼0.17
BSP	Paras Bains	555	0.74%	New
Independent	Jagpal Singh Rana	534	0.71%	New
Margin of victory		13,264	17.66%	▲15.92
Turnout		75,101	81.67%	▼4.52
Registered electors		91,955		▲11.19
Independent gain from INC		Swing	▲8.21	

=== Assembly Election 2017 ===
2017 Himachal Pradesh Legislative Assembly election: Nalagarh
Party	Candidate	Votes	%	±%
INC	Lakhvinder Singh Rana	25,872	36.30%	▼4.66
BJP	Krishan Lal Thakur	24,630	34.55%	▼21.05
Independent	Hardeep Singh Bawa	13,095	18.37%	New
Independent	Harpreet Singh Saini	5,443	7.64%	New
NOTA	None of the Above	678	0.95%	New
Independent	Gurnam Singh	613	0.86%	New
Margin of victory		1,242	1.74%	▼12.90
Turnout		71,281	86.19%	▲0.60
Registered electors		82,701		▲11.36
INC gain from BJP		Swing	▼19.30	

=== Assembly Election 2012 ===
2012 Himachal Pradesh Legislative Assembly election: Nalagarh
Party	Candidate	Votes	%	±%
BJP	Krishan Lal Thakur	35,341	55.60%	▲7.03
INC	Lakhvinder Singh Rana	26,033	40.96%	▼10.47
BSP	Anant Ram	610	0.96%	New
SP	Gurnam Singh	597	0.94%	New
HLC	Pola Ram Dhang Wala	537	0.84%	New
LJP	Gurbax Singh Chauhan	380	0.60%	New
Margin of victory		9,308	14.64%	▲11.79
Turnout		63,563	85.59%	▲2.97
Registered electors		74,262		▲9.56
BJP gain from INC		Swing	▲4.17	

=== Assembly By-election 2011 ===
2011 Himachal Pradesh Legislative Assembly by-election: Nalagarh
Party	Candidate	Votes	%	±%
INC	Lakhvinder Singh Rana	28,799	51.43%	▲7.31
BJP	Gurnam Kaur	27,200	48.57%	▼2.27
Margin of victory		1,599	2.86%	▼3.86
Turnout		55,999	82.62%	▼0.56
Registered electors		67,780		▼0.93
INC gain from BJP		Swing		

=== Assembly Election 2007 ===
2007 Himachal Pradesh Legislative Assembly election: Nalagarh
Party	Candidate	Votes	%	±%
BJP	Hari Naraian Singh	28,929	50.84%	▲8.61
INC	Lakhvinder Singh Rana	25,108	44.12%	▲7.59
BSP	Vinod Thakur	1,233	2.17%	New
SP	Gurnam Singh	1,024	1.80%	New
LJP	Chaudhary Gurbakhsh Singh	565	0.99%	New
Margin of victory		3,821	6.71%	▲1.03
Turnout		56,905	83.18%	▼2.71
Registered electors		68,414		▲8.38
BJP hold		Swing	▲8.61	

=== Assembly Election 2003 ===
2003 Himachal Pradesh Legislative Assembly election: Nalagarh
Party	Candidate	Votes	%	±%
BJP	Hari Naraian Singh	22,892	42.22%	▼12.20
INC	Sukriti Kumari	19,809	36.54%	▼5.51
Independent	Lakhvinder Singh Rana	11,515	21.24%	New
Margin of victory		3,083	5.69%	▼6.69
Turnout		54,216	85.91%	▲8.90
Registered electors		63,126		▲12.85
BJP hold		Swing		

=== Assembly Election 1998 ===
1998 Himachal Pradesh Legislative Assembly election: Nalagarh
Party	Candidate	Votes	%	±%
BJP	Hari Naraian Singh	23,435	54.42%	▲22.98
INC	Vijayendra Singh	18,105	42.05%	▼3.98
CPI	Khaminder Singh	770	1.79%	New
BSP	Manjeet Singh	550	1.28%	▼14.52
Margin of victory		5,330	12.38%	▼2.21
Turnout		43,061	78.21%	▲0.21
Registered electors		55,936		▲10.01
BJP gain from INC		Swing	▲8.39	

=== Assembly Election 1993 ===
1993 Himachal Pradesh Legislative Assembly election: Nalagarh
Party	Candidate	Votes	%	±%
INC	Vijayendra Singh	17,969	46.03%	▼11.15
BJP	Kehar Singh	12,273	31.44%	New
BSP	Hari Naraian Singh	6,166	15.79%	▲13.48
Independent	Khaminder Singh	1,795	4.60%	New
Independent	Braham Sarup Sharma	716	1.83%	New
Margin of victory		5,696	14.59%	▼3.76
Turnout		39,038	77.54%	▲3.25
Registered electors		50,846		▲8.10
INC hold		Swing	▼11.15	

=== Assembly Election 1990 ===
1990 Himachal Pradesh Legislative Assembly election: Nalagarh
Party	Candidate	Votes	%	±%
INC	Vijayandra Singh	19,774	57.18%	▼23.40
JD	Kehar Singh	13,428	38.83%	New
BSP	Manjeet Singh	801	2.32%	New
Independent	Gaigal Ram Bansal	352	1.02%	New
Independent	Asha Ram	228	0.66%	New
Margin of victory		6,346	18.35%	▼43.29
Turnout		34,583	74.13%	▼1.88
Registered electors		47,035		▲28.25
INC hold		Swing	▼23.40	

=== Assembly Election 1985 ===
1985 Himachal Pradesh Legislative Assembly election: Nalagarh
Party	Candidate	Votes	%	±%
INC	Vijayendra Singh	22,284	80.58%	▲18.30
Independent	Kehar Singh	5,237	18.94%	New
Margin of victory		17,047	61.64%	▲26.76
Turnout		27,654	75.98%	▼0.95
Registered electors		36,675		▲5.69
INC hold		Swing	▲18.30	

=== Assembly Election 1982 ===
1982 Himachal Pradesh Legislative Assembly election: Nalagarh
Party	Candidate	Votes	%	±%
INC	Vijayendra Singh	16,500	62.28%	New
Independent	Arjun Singh	7,259	27.40%	New
CPI	Randeep Singh	1,267	4.78%	▼7.17
BJP	Ram Dayal	1,113	4.20%	New
JP	Kartar Singh	188	0.71%	▼69.13
Independent	Rala Ram	167	0.63%	New
Margin of victory		9,241	34.88%	▼17.09
Turnout		26,494	77.23%	▲6.32
Registered electors		34,699		▲15.57
INC gain from JP		Swing	▼7.56	

=== Assembly Election 1977 ===
1977 Himachal Pradesh Legislative Assembly election: Nalagarh
Party	Candidate	Votes	%	±%
JP	Vijayendra Singh	14,684	69.84%	New
Independent	Arjun Singh	3,756	17.86%	New
CPI	Gurucharan Singh	2,514	11.96%	▼19.62
Margin of victory		10,928	51.97%	▲27.09
Turnout		21,026	70.79%	▲10.32
Registered electors		30,023		▲12.19
JP gain from INC		Swing	▲13.38	

=== Assembly Election 1972 ===
1972 Himachal Pradesh Legislative Assembly election: Nalagarh
Party	Candidate	Votes	%	±%
INC	Arjun Singh	9,021	56.46%	▲37.43
CPI	Kala Ram	5,045	31.57%	New
Independent	Kashmiri Lal	1,495	9.36%	New
SSP	Gauri Shanker	417	2.61%	New
Margin of victory		3,976	24.88%	▲22.12
Turnout		15,978	61.48%	▼9.18
Registered electors		26,760		▲9.43
INC gain from Independent		Swing	▲30.96	

=== Assembly Election 1967 ===
1967 Himachal Pradesh Legislative Assembly election: Nalagarh
Party	Candidate	Votes	%	±%
Independent	Arjun Singh	4,295	25.49%	New
Independent	R. Ram	3,830	22.73%	New
Independent	I. Ram	3,339	19.82%	New
INC	H. Ram	3,205	19.02%	New
Independent	G. Nath	1,764	10.47%	New
Independent	K. Nath	414	2.46%	New
Margin of victory		465	2.76%	
Turnout		16,847	71.72%	
Registered electors		24,455		
Independent win (new seat)				

== See also ==
- List of constituencies of the Himachal Pradesh Legislative Assembly
- Solan district
- Nalagarh
