= Second Shanta Kumar ministry =

Himachal Pradesh ministry from 1990 to 1992

- Ministry of Himachal Pradesh
- Date formed: 5 March 1990
- Date dissolved: 15 December 1992

People and organisations
- Governor: Virendra Verma
- Chief Minister: Shanta Kumar
- No. of ministers: 7
- Member parties: Bharatiya Janata Party
- Status in legislature: Majority government

History
- Election: 1990 Himachal Pradesh Legislative Assembly election
- Predecessor: Virbhadra Singh ministry
- Successor: President's rule

Shanta Kumar twice became Chief Minister of Himachal Pradesh. He first served as chief minister from 22 June 1977 to 14 February 1980. He served a second term from 5 March 1990 to 15 December 1992. Here are names of the members of his second ministry:

== Cabinet ministers ==
Sno.	Name	Office	Portfolio	Took Office	Left Office
1	Shanta Kumar	Chief Minister		5 March 1990	15 December 1992
2	Radha Raman Shastri	Cabinet Minister		5 March 1990	15 December 1992
3	Kishori Lal	Cabinet Minister		5 March 1990	15 December 1992
4	Jagdev Chand	Cabinet Minister		5 March 1990	15 December 1992
5	Kunj Lal Thakur	Cabinet Minister		5 March 1990	15 December 1992
6	Nagin Chandra Pal	Cabinet Minister		5 March 1990	15 December 1992
7	Roop Singh	Cabinet Minister		5 March 1990	15 December 1992

== See also ==
- Shanta Kumar ministry (1977–80)
