= Kumar, Jammu and Kashmir =

Kumar
- City
- Location in Jammu and Kashmir, India Kumar (India)
- Coordinates: 33°41′0″N 74°7′0″E
- Country: India
- Union territory: Jammu and Kashmir
- District: Poonch
- Time zone: UTC+05:30 (IST)

Kumār is a city located in Poonch, Jammu and Kashmir, India.

- Altitude (feet) 4019
- Altitude (meters) 1224
- Time zone (est) UTC+5:30

Nearby Cities and Towns West North East South Nabina (0.6 nm) Salotri (0.4 nm) Salan (0.9 nm) Kas Balari (1.0 nm) Kaini (0.8 nm)
