= Subhash Thakur =

Indian politician

Subhash Thakur is an Indian member of the legislative assembly (MLA) from Bilaspur, Himachal Pradesh. He defeated Bumber Thakur of Indian National Congress (INC) by 6862 votes.
