= Jagat Singh Negi =

Indian politician

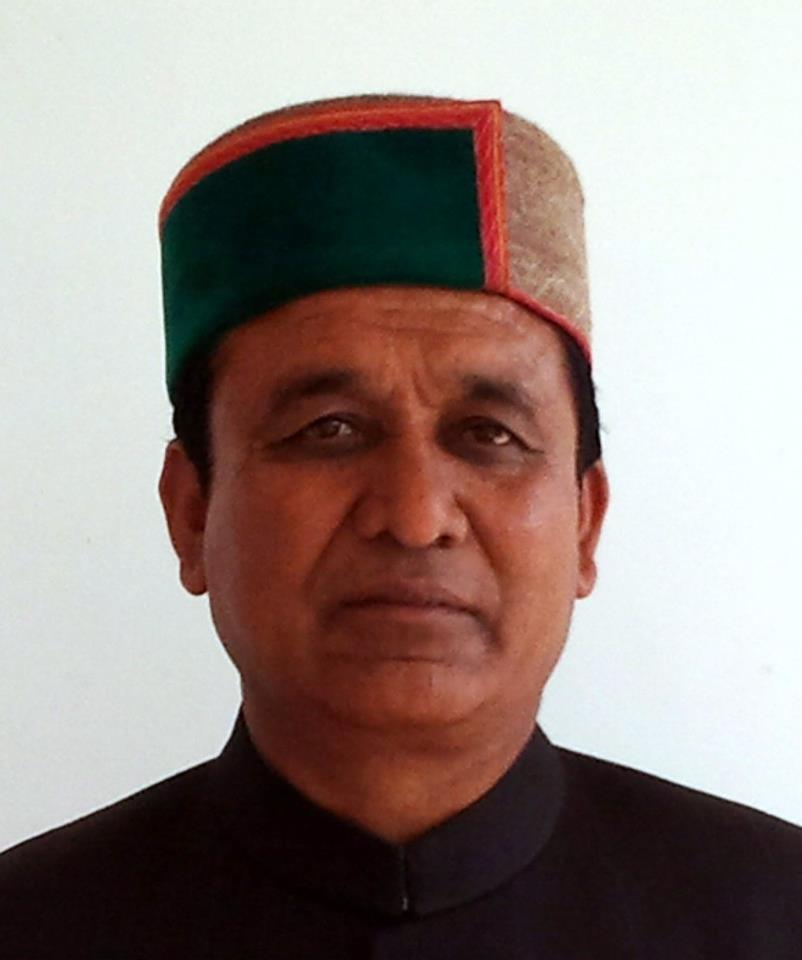

Cabinet Minister, Government of Himachal Pradesh
- Incumbent
- Assumed office 8 January 2023
- Governor: Rajendra Arlekar (2022–2023); Shiv Pratap Shukla (2023–2026); Kavinder Gupta (2026–present)
- Cabinet: Sukhu ministry
- Chief Minister: Sukhvinder Singh Sukhu
- Ministry and Departments: Revenue; Horticulture; Tribal Development

Deputy Speaker of Himachal Pradesh Legislative Assembly
- In office 12 March 2013 – 21 December 2017
- Governor: Urmila Singh; Kalyan Singh; Acharya Devvrat
- Chief Minister: Virbhadra Singh
- Preceded by: Vacant
- Succeeded by: Hans Raj

Member of the Himachal Pradesh Legislative Assembly
- Incumbent
- Assumed office 20 December 2012
- Preceded by: Tejwant Singh Negi
- Constituency: Kinnaur
- In office 6 March 2003 – 30 December 2007
- Preceded by: Chet Ram Negi
- Succeeded by: Tejwant Singh Negi
- Constituency: Kinnaur
- In office 27 May 1995 – 28 February 1998
- Preceded by: Dev Raj Negi
- Succeeded by: Chet Ram Negi
- Constituency: Kinnaur

Personal details
- Born: 2 February 1957 (age 69) Kalpa, Himachal Pradesh, India
- Party: Indian National Congress
- Spouse: Susheela Negi
- Children: One Son & One daughter
- Parent: Gyan Singh Negi (father)
- Education: B.A. and L.L.B

Jagat Singh Negi (born 2 February 1957 in Kalpa, Dist. Kinnaur) is a Member of the Legislative Assembly from Kinnaur, India. He was the Deputy Speaker of Himachal Pradesh Legislative Assembly from March 2013 to December 2017. He is an Indian politician and a member of Indian National Congress and Horticulture, Revenue and Tribal Minister of Himachal Pradesh.

In 2015 he and Sunder Singh Verma attended the Fifth India Region CPA Conference.

== Early life and family ==
Jagat Singh Negi's father was Shri Gyan Singh Negi, a former Member of the Himachal Pradesh Vidhan Sabha. He is a graduate in B.A. and L.L.B., having received his education at DAV College, Chandigarh, and Punjab University, Chandigarh. Jagat Singh Negi is married to Smt. Susheela Negi since 1 July 1982, and the couple has one son and one daughter. He is an advocate and horticulturist by profession.

== Social and organizational contributions ==
Jagat Singh Negi was the Founder President of the Distt. Apple and Vegetable Growers Association, Kinnaur, from 1980 to 1995. He also served as the President of Distt. Bar Association, Kinnaur, from 1980 to 1995, Distt. Youth Congress Committee, Kinnaur, from 1980 to 1995, and Distt. Congress Committee from 1996 to 2011. He also held the positions of Vice-President and President of the Football Association, Himachal Pradesh, in 1996 and from 2005 to 2009, respectively. Furthermore, Jagat Singh Negi served as the Chairman of Panchayat Smiti, Pooh, from 1987 to 1992, and Vice Chairman of HP State Scheduled Castes & Scheduled Tribes Development Corporation in 1996-97.

== Political career ==
Jagat Singh Negi's political journey includes being elected to the State Legislative Assembly on 27 May 1995 (by-election) and subsequently being re-elected in June 2003, 2012, December 2017, and December 2022. He has held various significant positions, such as Parliamentary Secretary from 18 April 2005 to 18 August 2005, Chairman of the Subordinate Legislation Committee from January 2013 to March 2013, and Deputy Speaker of the Himachal Pradesh Vidhan Sabha from 12 March 2013 to 21 December 2017.

In his fifth term, Jagat Singh Negi was elected to the State Legislative Assembly in December 2022. On 8 January 2023, he was inducted into the Council of Ministers as the Revenue Minister along with portfolios of Horticulture & Tribal Development.

== Sports achievements ==
An active sportsman during college days, Jagat Singh Negi represented Haryana in the National Junior Hockey Championship in Madras in 1977. He was also part of the winning DAV College, Chandigarh team in the Punjab University Inter-College Hockey Championship in 1977-78.
