= Jabal Kumar =

- Location within Iraq

Highest point
- Coordinates: 34°35′28″N 45°03′30″E

Geography
- Location: Iraq

Jabal Kumar is a mountain located in Iraq which is 238 meters tall.
