= Kumar Bandi =

Kumar Bandi (Sangir Hills) Sangir Syedan
- Location in Pakistan
- Coordinates: 34°16′15″N 73°33′25″E
- Country: Pakistan
- Governorate: Azad Kashmir
- District: Muzaffarabad

Kumar Bandi is a town located in Kupwara, Muzaffarabad District, Pakistan. It is located at 34°16'15" North, 73°33'25" East at an altitude of 1434 metres."Sangir Syedan" about 17 km away from the Capital Muzaffar abad, Azad Jammu & Kashmir, is the highest residential point from the sea level of this village. The town was electrified in 1986. .
