= Tilak Raj =

Indian cricketer (born 1960)

Personal information
- Full name: Tilak Raj
- Born: 15 January 1960 (age 66); Delhi, India
- Role: Left-hand batsman Left-hand bowler
- Source: Cricinfo, 30 March 2021

Tilak Raj, is a former Indian cricketer who played for Baroda and Delhi. He was a left-handed batsman who is best known for being the unfortunate victim of Ravi Shastri's six sixes in an over in 1985. It was only the second instance of this in first-class cricket.
