= Ram Lal Thakur =

Indian politician

Member of the Himachal Pradesh Legislative Assembly
- In office December 2017 – 2022
- Constituency: Sri Naina Deviji

Personal details
- Born: 7 June 1951 (age 75) Bilaspur, Himachal Pradesh, India
- Party: Indian National Congress

Ram Lal Thakur, is an Indian National Congress politician from Himachal Pradesh, India. He is also a MLA from Sri Naina Deviji Assembly constituency.

== Early life and education ==
He was born on 7 June 1951, in the village of Ghial in Bilaspur district. He has done B.A., LL.B. and Post Graduate Diploma in Personnel Management and Labour Welfare. He has done LL.B from Faculty of Law, Himachal Pradesh University, Shimla. He is married to Kamlesh Thakur.

== Career ==
He was a sportsperson and represented the state in Kabaddi six (6) times at the national level and remained its captain thrice. He was the member of Himachal Pradesh University Sports Council. He was also the General Secretary of Central Students’ Association, Himachal Pradesh University. He was adjudged as the best National Cadet Corps Cadet on All India level during Republic Day Parade and also as the best cadet from Punjab, Haryana, Chandigarh and Himachal Pradesh in 1971. He was the President of Youth Congress in Bilaspur from 1978 to 1982. He got arrested during Jail Bharo Andolan of Congress Party in 1978. He is the member of All India Congress Committee.

He was elected to the Himachal Pradesh State Legislative Assembly first in 1985 and was re-elected again in 1993, 1998 and 2003. He remained the chairman of PUC from 1994 to 1995. He was the Minister of State for Law, Youth Services and Sports, Ayurveda and local self Government from 1985 to 1990. He was also the Health Minister (at Cabinet Rank) from 1996 to 1998. He is working as Cabinet Minister for Industries, I.T. and Youth Services and Sports from March, 2003 onwards.
