= Kumar Barilya =

Village in Dhaka Division, Bangladesh

Coordinates: 23°40′40″N 90°04′35″E

Kumar Barilya is a village in Baruakhali Union, Nawabganj Upazila, Dhaka District, Dhaka Division in Bangladesh.
