= Krishan Lal Thakur =

Indian politician

Krishan Lal Thakur is an Indian politician. He is a member of the Bharatiya Janata Party. Thakur is a member of the Himachal Pradesh Legislative Assembly from the Nalagarh constituency in Solan district. He was banned from BJP for more than 6 years for showing disrespect to Narendra Modi because of the election of 2022. He was previously a member of Indian National Congress.

== Electoral performance ==
2012 Himachal Pradesh Legislative Assembly election: Nalagarh
Party	Candidate	Votes	%	±%
BJP	Krishan Lal Thakur	35,341	55.60%	▲7.03
INC	Lakhvinder Singh Rana	26,033	40.96%	▼10.47
BSP	Anant Ram	610	0.96%	New
SP	Gurnam Singh	597	0.94%	New
HLC	Pola Ram Dhang Wala	537	0.84%	New
LJP	Gurbax Singh Chauhan	380	0.60%	New
Margin of victory		9,308	14.64%	▲11.79
Turnout		63,563	85.59%	▲2.97
Registered electors		74,262		▲9.56
BJP gain from INC		Swing	▲4.17	

2017 Himachal Pradesh Legislative Assembly election: Nalagarh
Party	Candidate	Votes	%	±%
INC	Lakhvinder Singh Rana	25,872	36.30%	▼4.66
BJP	Krishan Lal Thakur	24,630	34.55%	▼21.05
Independent	Hardeep Singh Bawa	13,095	18.37%	New
Independent	Harpreet Singh Saini	5,443	7.64%	New
NOTA	None of the Above	678	0.95%	New
Independent	Gurnam Singh	613	0.86%	New
Margin of victory		1,242	1.74%	▼12.90
Turnout		71,281	86.19%	▲0.60
Registered electors		82,701		▲11.36
INC gain from BJP		Swing	▼19.30	
