= Chet Ram Negi =

Indian politician

Chet Ram Negi is an Indian politician from Himachal Pradesh. He belongs to the Bharatiya Janata Party.

In 1998, he was elected from Kinnaur district's Kinnaur assembly constituency of Himachal Pradesh.
