= Ishwar Dass Dhiman =

Indian politician

- Born: 17 November 1934; Dialri, Hamirpur district
- Died: 15 November 2016 (aged 81); Dialri
- Occupation: Politician
- Known for: Education Minister 1998-2003

Ishwar Dass Dhiman (17 November 1934 – 15 November 2016) was an Indian politician from Himachal Pradesh.

Ishwar Dhiman was born at Dialri, Hamirpur district to G.R. Dhiman in 1934. He was educated at the Punjab University in Chandigarh and the Himachal Pradesh University in Shimla. He held M.A. and M.Ed. degrees. He was married to Satya Dhiman; the couple has a son and two daughters.

Ishwar Dhiman worked in academia and government, serving as a high school headmaster for 13 years. He was the President of the Headmasters/Principals Association (Hamirpur district) during 1987-89. After retirement from the government service, he joined the Bharatiya Janata Party in 1989. Subsequently, he held the following posts:

- Member, B.J.P. State Executive Committee, 1990–93
- State Delegate, Hamirpur district, B.J.P., 1990–92

He was elected to the Himachal Pradesh State Legislative Assembly in 1990, 1993, 1998, 2003 and 2007 from Mewa constituency and in 2012 from Bhoranj, Hamirpur district H.P for record sixth time. Mewa . He served as the education minister during 1998-2003 and was re-appointed to the same post in 2008.
