= Hari Naraian Singh =

Indian politician

Hari Naraian Singh was an Indian politician and member of the Bharatiya Janata Party. Singh was a member of the Himachal Pradesh Legislative Assembly from the Nalagarh constituency in Solan district. He was succeeded by Lakhvinder Singh Rana.
