= Thakur Sen Negi =

Politician and writer from Kinnaur district of Himachal Pradesh

Thakur Sen Negi (1909-2002) was an Indian politician and member of the Bharatiya Janata Party. Negi was a member of the Himachal Pradesh Legislative Assembly from the Kinnaur constituency in Kinnaur district.

He was born on 5 September 1909, at village Shong in district Kinnaur. His father's name was Narayan Dass and mother's name was Smt. Niram Dass. He did schooling from Padam High School in Rampur (then in Rampur-Bushahr state) and Victoria Dallep High School in Solan, from where he passed out in 1924. He did BSc. in Agriculture at the Punjab Agricultural College in Lyallpur (now Faisalabad, Pakistan) over 1928-32, and LLB from Law College, Lahore, as a part time student in 1933-35.

Joined government service in 1932 and retired only in 1966 as Chief Secretary to Himachal Pradesh Government. Later on made Advisor to Himachal Pradesh Government. Elected to State Assembly in 1967, 1972, 1977 and 1982. From 1966 to 1972, was leader of United Opposition Front. Became leader of Progressive Front from 1972 to 1977. In 1977 was made Cabinet Minister. Was President of State Unit of the Janta Party from 1977 to 1979. Elected Speaker of the State Assembly during Janta Party rule from 1979 to 1984. Member of Commission for Scheduled Caste and Scheduled Tribe (Government of India 1978–81).

Besides this he has been in Indian Institute of Public Administration, Indian Council of World Affairs, Bharat Krishak Samaj, Indian Society of Agriculture Economics, Amnesty International, participated in Commonwealth Parliamentary Association Conference from 1979-84 etc.

Wrote famous book titled -"Scheduled Tribes of Himachal Pradesh ".

Once again, occupied the chair of Speaker in Himachal Pradesh Assembly after winning June 1990 election.
