= Tejwant Singh =

Indian politician

Tejwant Singh was an Indian politician and member of the Bharatiya Janata Party. Singh was a member of the Himachal Pradesh Legislative Assembly from the Kinnaur constituency in Kinnaur district.
