= Shillai =

Coordinates: 30°39′49″N 77°46′03″E

- shillai
- Nickname: Shillai Dhar
- Interactive map of Shillai
- Country: India
- State: Himachal Pradesh
- District: Sirmaur
- Tehsil: Shillai
- Elevation meter: 1,700 m (5,600 ft)
- Pin Code: 173027
- Area code: 01704

Shillai is a town in the Sirmaur District of Himachal Pradesh in Northern India. Shillai is located on a south east-facing hill at an elevation of 1,900 metres. The hill is called shillai dhar, and is 2,100 meters high.

== Geography ==
Shillai is located on the ridge of a mountain at an altitude of 1900 m. The average temperature ranges from 20° to 30 °C in summer and -1° to 20° in winter. Shillai has a temperate climate, in summer the maximum temperature ranges from 24 to 28 degrees Celsius, whereas, in winter, it snows sometimes.

Shillai is divided into two regions: the Village Shillai (lower part) and the Shillai town (upper part). There is a greenbelt of a forest all around and inside the village, which is connected with the town by road as well as pedestrian roads.

== Transport infrastructure ==
- Shillai is connected by National Highway No. 707 with Paonta Sahib and Rohru and with Shimla via Solan, Rajgarh, Rohnat. The city is connected with Dehradun by menus bridge, Vikasnagar in Uttarakhand.
- Nearest Railway station is Dehradun.
- Nearest Airport is Dehradun and Chandigarh.
- A helipad is built at Shillai for Helicopter transportation near Naya Village 3 km from Shillai
