= Vinod Kumari =

Indian politician

Vinod Kumari Chandel is an Indian politician and member of the Bharatiya Janata Party. Vinod Kumari was a member of the Himachal Pradesh Legislative Assembly from the Doon constituency in Solan district.
