= Lok Raj Party Himachal Pradesh =

Political party in India

Lok Raj Party Himachal Pradesh (People's Rule Party Himachal Pradesh) was a political party in the Indian state of Himachal Pradesh in the beginning of the 1970s. LRP was founded in 1967 by Thakur Sen Negi and Jai Bihari Lal Khachi.

LRP contested the 1971 Lok Sabha elections and the 1972 state assembly elections.

In the 1972 state assembly elections LRP had put up candidates in 16 out of 68 constituencies. Two were elected. In total the party received 44067 votes (5,02% of the votes in the state).

The Party was dissolved before the 1977 general elections.
