= Bamta =

- Village
- Location in Himachal Pradesh, India Bamta (India)
- Coordinates: 31.01917°N 77.62028°E
- Country: India
- State: Himachal Pradesh
- District: Shimla

Government
  - Type: Gram panchayat
- Elevation: 2,400 m (7,900 ft)

Languages
  - Official: Hindi
  - Regional: Mahasu Pahari (Bishashau)
- Time zone: UTC+5:30 (IST)
- PIN: 171211
- ISO 3166 code: IND

Bamta is a Gram Panchayat in Chopal tehsil of Shimla district, Himachal Pradesh, India.

== History ==
Bamta was historically part of the Jubbal State, a princely state among the Simla Hill States during the British period. The Punjab States Gazetteer, Volume VIII: Simla Hill States, published in 1911, lists Bamta among the southern parganas of Jubbal State, establishing its administrative association with the state at the time.

An early nineteenth-century account by Scottish traveller James Baillie Fraser provides a historical reference to the settlement under the spelling Bumpta. Fraser travelled through the Himalayan region in 1815 and subsequently published his account in 1820. Fraser's work also included a plate entitled Village & Castle of Bumpta, depicting the settlement and its fort. The British Library catalogue describes the work as a coloured aquatint by Robert Havell and Son after Fraser, published in Views in the Himala Mountains in London in 1820. In his account, Fraser described Bumpta as a village and fort in the Jubbal region. He noted that the fort had formerly been a substantial place of strength, with strong walls and towers commanding the valley below. By the time of his visit, the fort had been destroyed by fire, and a new residence for the Rana of Jubbal was being constructed on its old foundations. Fraser further recorded that part of the new building was intended to serve as a temple and contained sculptures of Hindu deities. This historic fort and residence is locally known as '''Basa'''.

Bamta subsequently became part of the present-day state of Himachal Pradesh and is now administered as a Gram Panchayat in Chaupal tehsil of Shimla district.

== Geography ==
Bamta is located in the south-western ranges of the Himalayas and sits at an average elevation of approximately 2,400 metres (7,900 feet) above mean sea level. The upper regions of Bamta are covered with dense forests of Chir pine (Pinus roxburghii) and towering Deodar cedar (Cedrus deodara), while the lower areas are marked by steep, rugged mountain slopes that descend sharply towards the river valley.

Geographically, the Bamta Valley lies between Kuppar Peak to the north and the Shalvi and Naarti rivers—both tributaries of the Yamuna River—to the south. The Bamta Gram Panchayat shares its eastern boundary with Paudiya village in the Tharoch Valley of Chopal Tehsil, its western boundary with Matal village, part of the Maraog apple belt, and its southern border is naturally formed by the Shalvi River, which separates it from Dewat Panchayat. Bamta is a major apple-producing area of the Chopal region.

The valley is divided into three distinct altitudinal zones based on topography, settlement patterns, and land use.

Lower Belt: This area includes villages such as Jhiknipul, Naar, and Thali, located closer to the river valley. A large portion of the cultivable land here is irrigated through traditional mountain water channels known as kuhls.

Middle Belt: The central region features villages such as Bajroth, Bhabhar, Badhola, Chadholi, Ghurla, and Rupari. These villages are characterized by widespread apple orchards and ghasin, common grazing lands typically used for livestock in the Himalayan region.

Upper Belt: This zone includes the core village of Bamta, along with Kashah, Thothia, Mamvi, and Shangroli. These are among the prominent apple-producing areas in the valley, contributing to the region's horticultural economy.

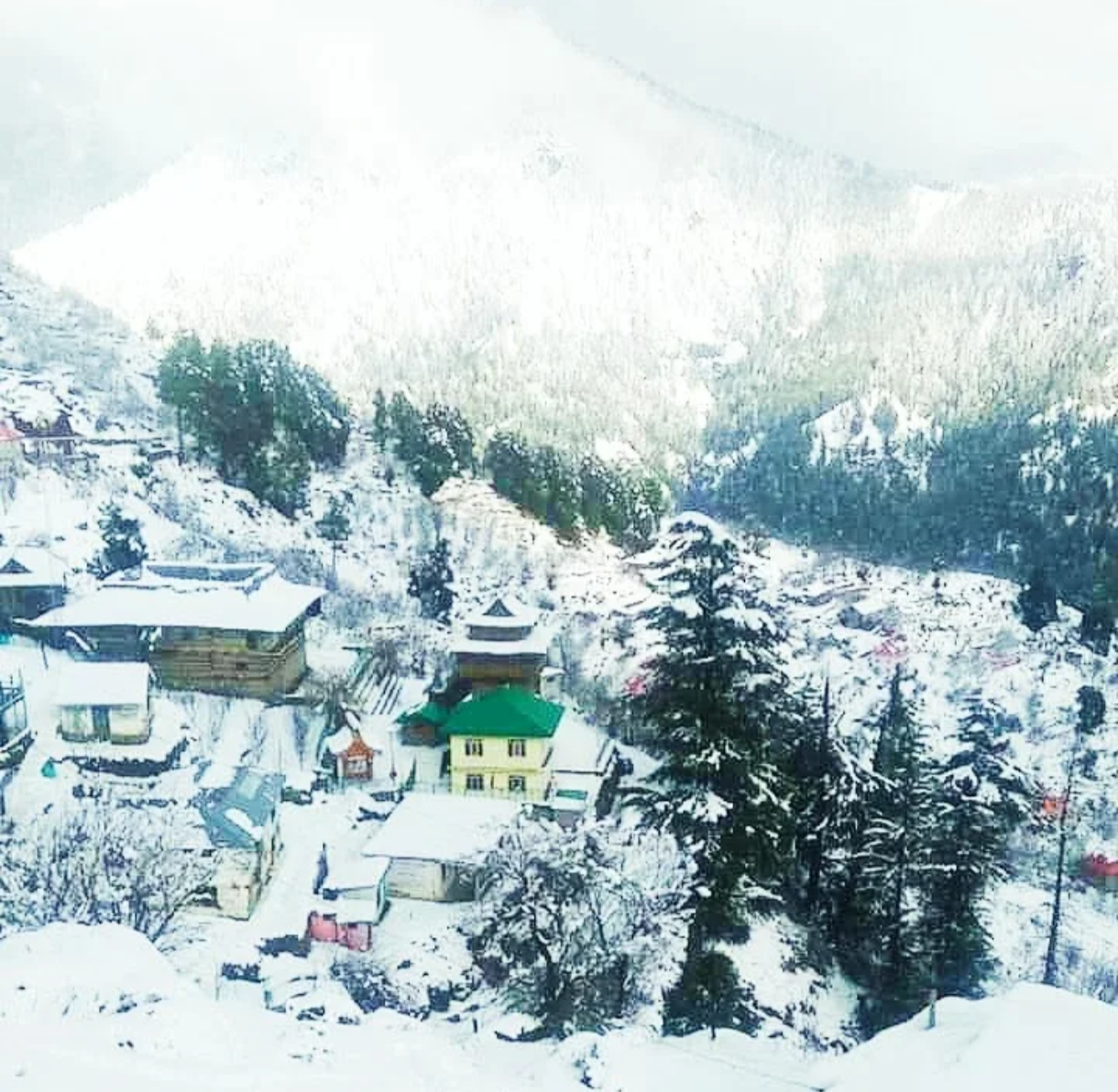
Historic Basa and Durga Mata Temple in Bamta, Himachal Pradesh

Village and Castle of Bumpta, a historical settlement and fort in the Jubbal region, depicted from a drawing by Scottish artist and traveller James Baillie Fraser during his 1815 journey through the Himalayas.

== Villages ==
The Bamta Panchayat comprises several villages spread across different elevations of the region. These include Bamta, Kashah, Lani, Shangroli, Jagrah, Mamvi, Pujali, Bhabhar, Ghurla, Karali (Kashah), Bajroth, Rupari, Thotiya, Kunjli, Throli, Nar, Rawtan, and Jhiknipul. According to the 2011 Census of India, Bamta village (village code 025409) had a population of 386 people living in 89 households, including 190 males and 196 females.

== Climate ==
Bamta experiences a typical mid-Himalayan mountain climate, with cool summers, cold winters, and moderate to high precipitation. Summers are generally mild, while the southwest monsoon from July to September brings substantial rainfall. Autumn is cool and dry and coincides with the apple harvesting season. Winters are cold, with temperatures often falling below 0°C, and snowfall is common in the upper areas. Spring brings warmer temperatures and the blossoming of orchards.

The climatic conditions of Bamta are highly suitable for horticulture, especially the cultivation of apples, pears, and stone fruits, which are the mainstay of the local economy. The region’s forests and pastures also thrive under these climatic conditions, supporting livestock and biodiversity.

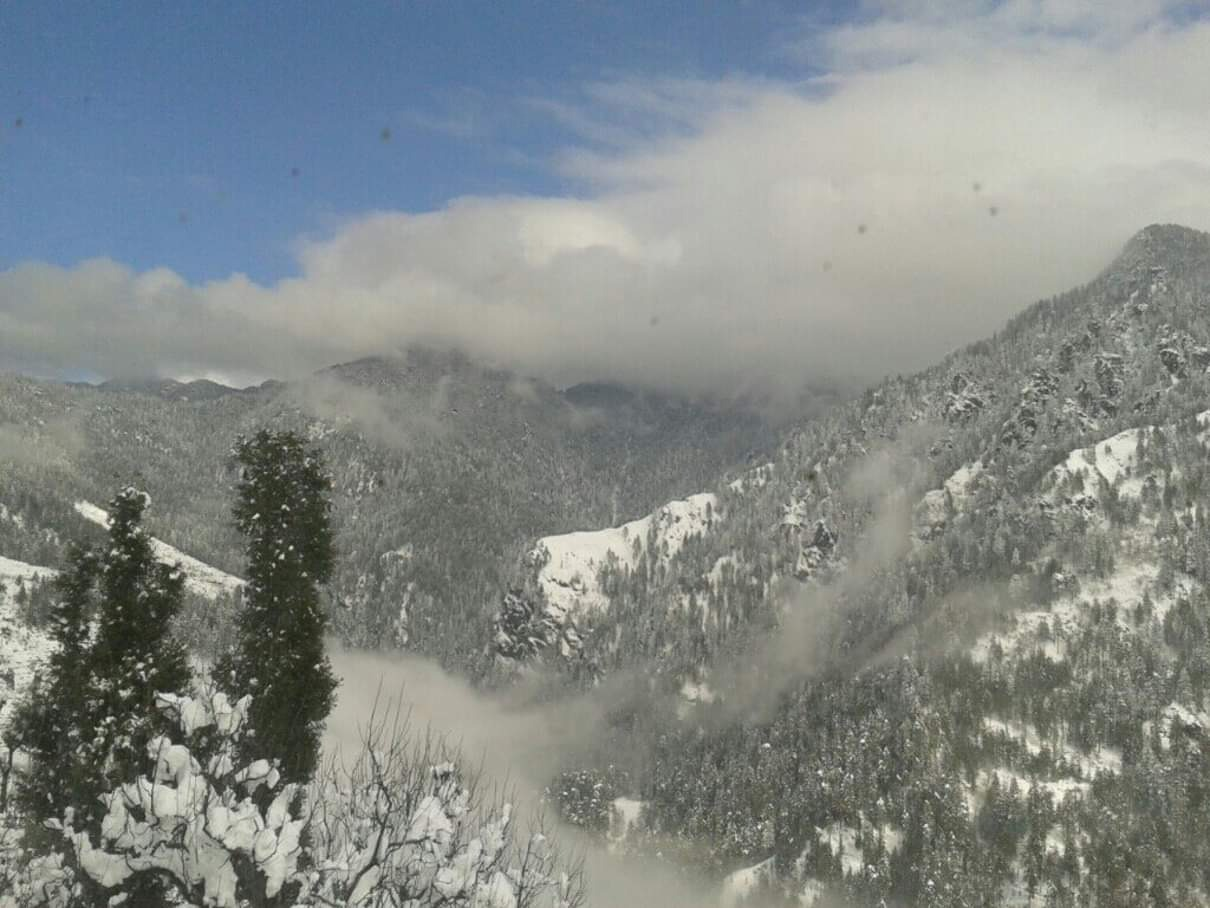
Scenic view of Jagrah in Bamta Panchayat, with snow-covered Himalayan peaks in the background

== Education ==
The main educational institution in the region is Government Senior Secondary School, Bamta, located in Lani village. The school provides education from the upper-primary to senior-secondary level and operates under the Department of Education, Himachal Pradesh. The school is co-educational, with Hindi as the medium of instruction.

Several government schools also serve students in Bamta and nearby villages. These include Government Primary School (GPS) Bamta, GPS Charoli, Government Middle School (GMS) Ghurla, GPS Ghurla, GPS Kashah, GPS Mamvi, GPS Rupari and GPS Shangroli.

== Temples and fairs ==
The Bamta region is known for its spiritual heritage and traditional religious practices associated with local deities. Prominent temples and shrines in Bamta and surrounding villages include Durga Mata Mandir and Lankerveer Mandir in Bamta, Mahasu Devta Temple in Ghurla, Kali Mata Mandir in Kashah, Dakreyi Devta Mandir in Pujarli, Naag Devta Mandir in Bhabhar, and Jaga Mata Mandir in Bajroth. The Himachal Pradesh Biodiversity Board has documented sacred groves associated with Dakreyi Devta at Pujarli and Nag Devta at Bamta.

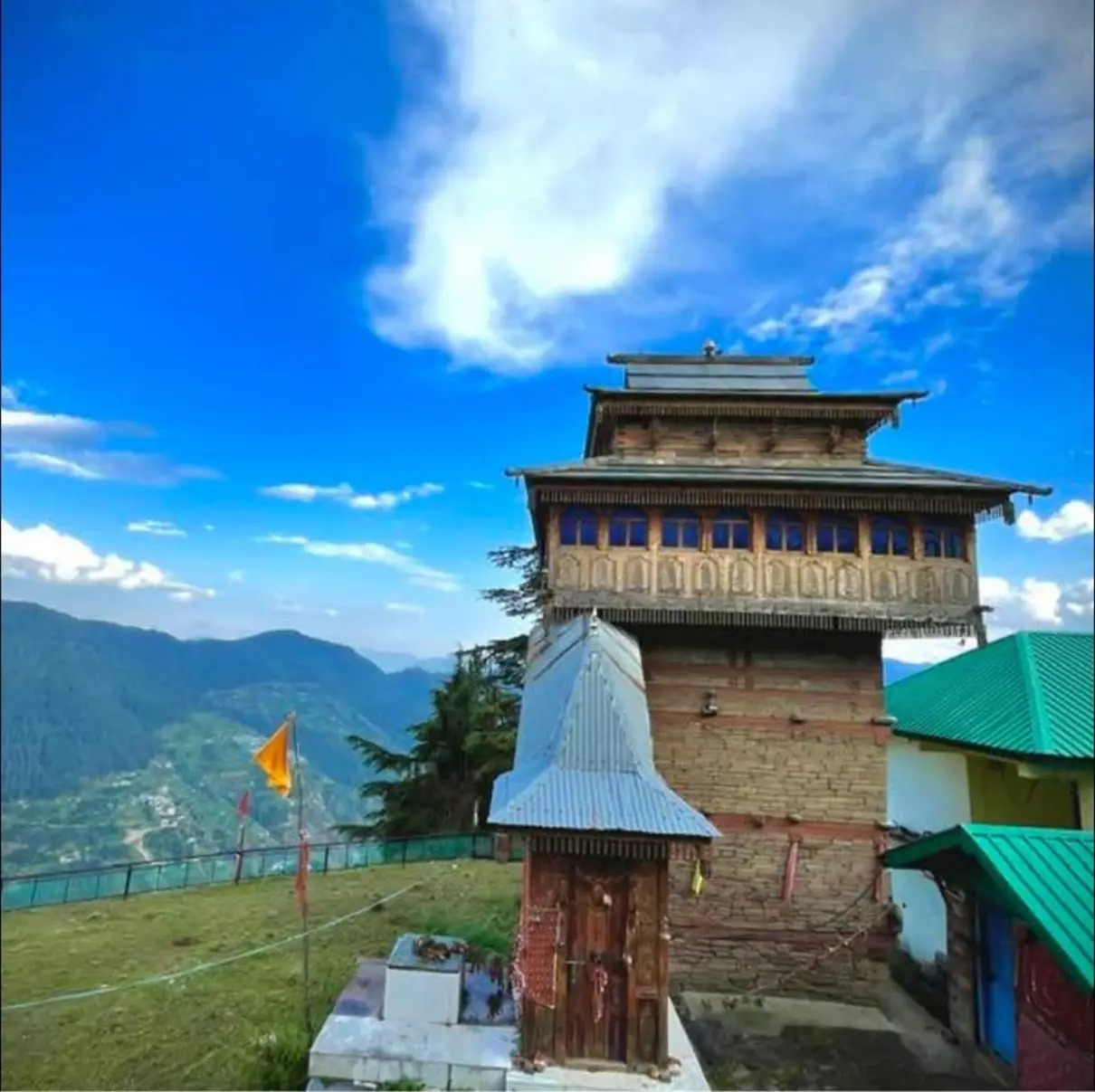
Durga Mata Temple, Bamta

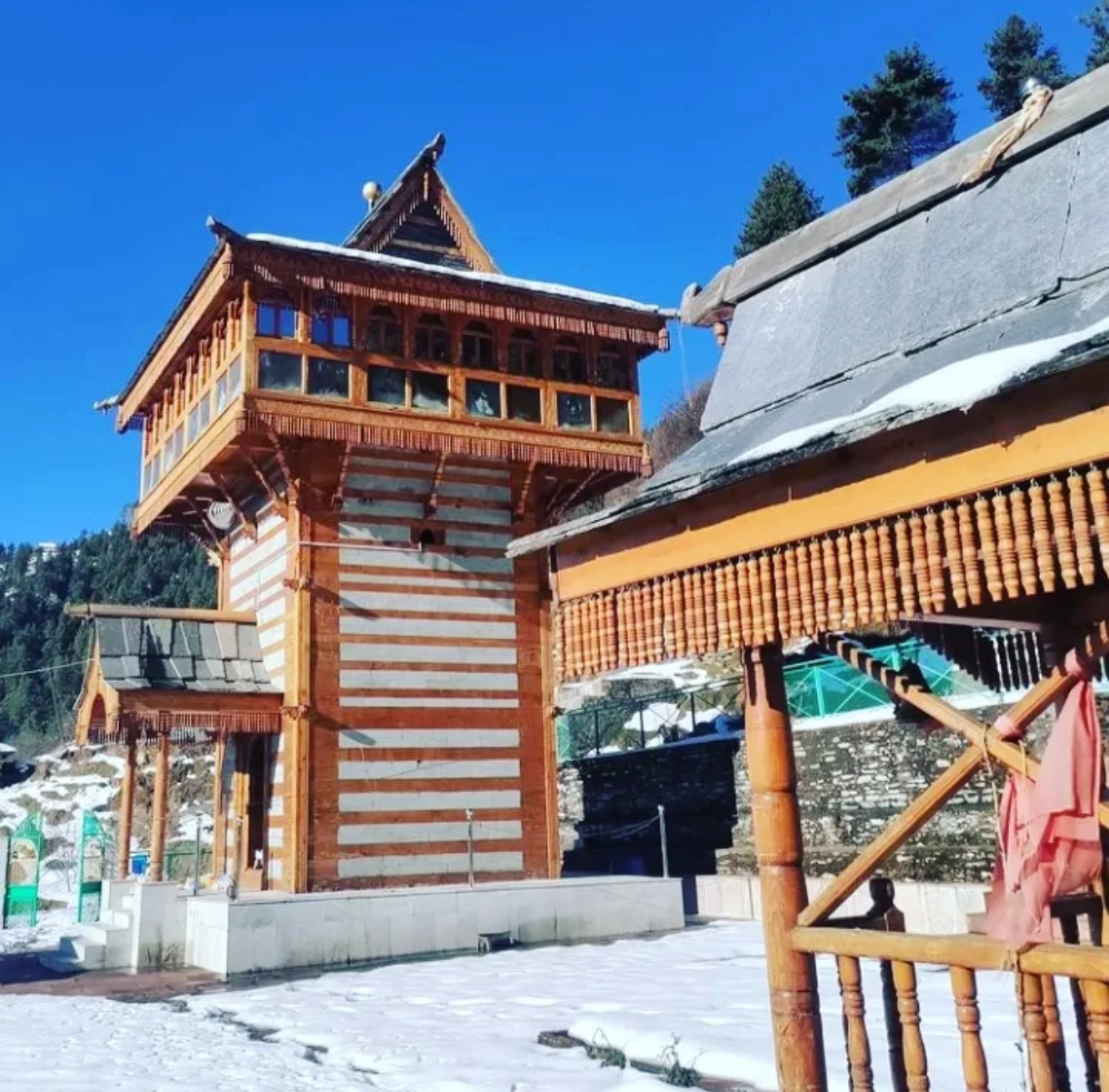
Dakreyi Devta Temple, Pujarli

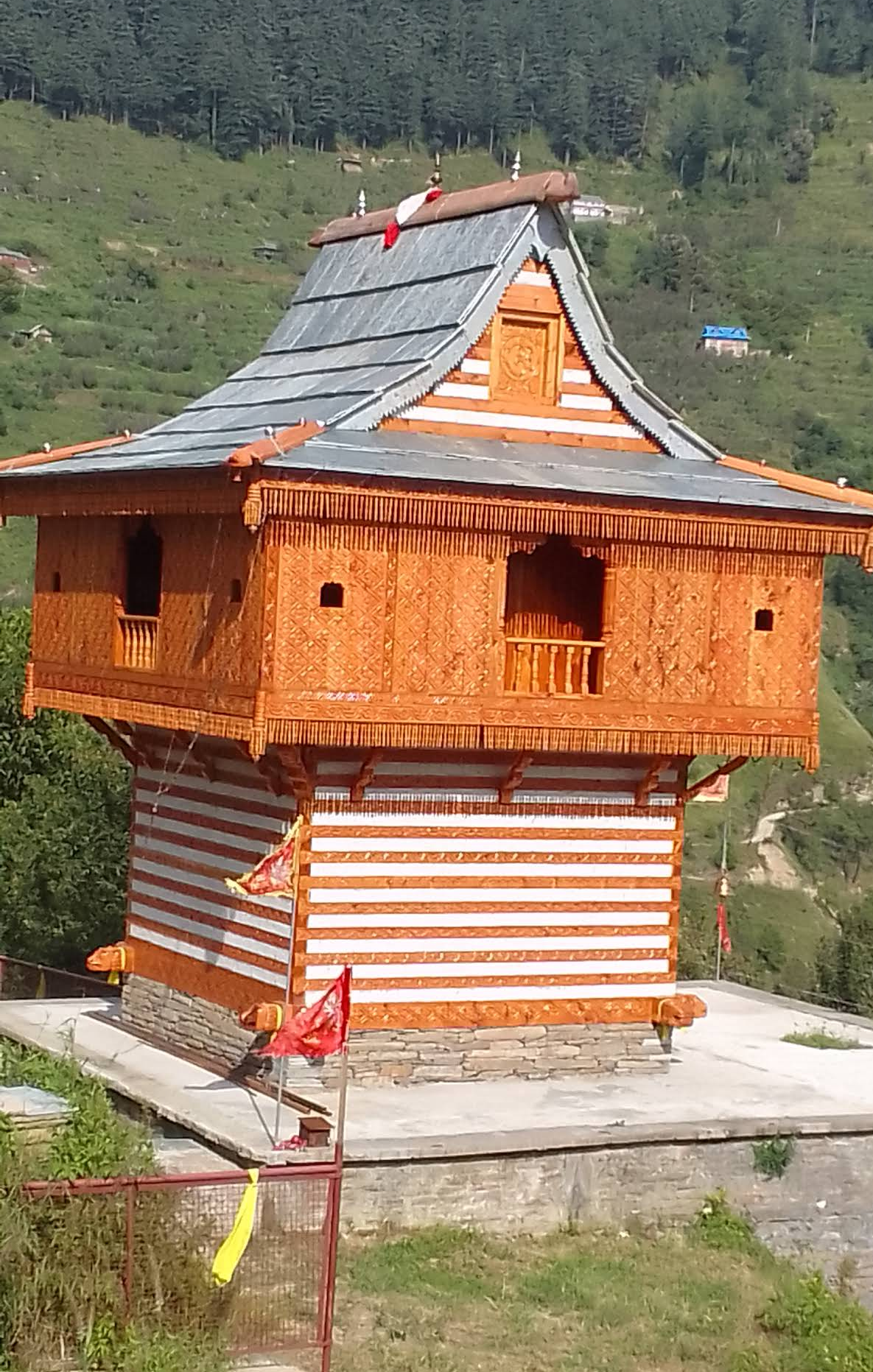
Jaga Mata Temple, Bajroth

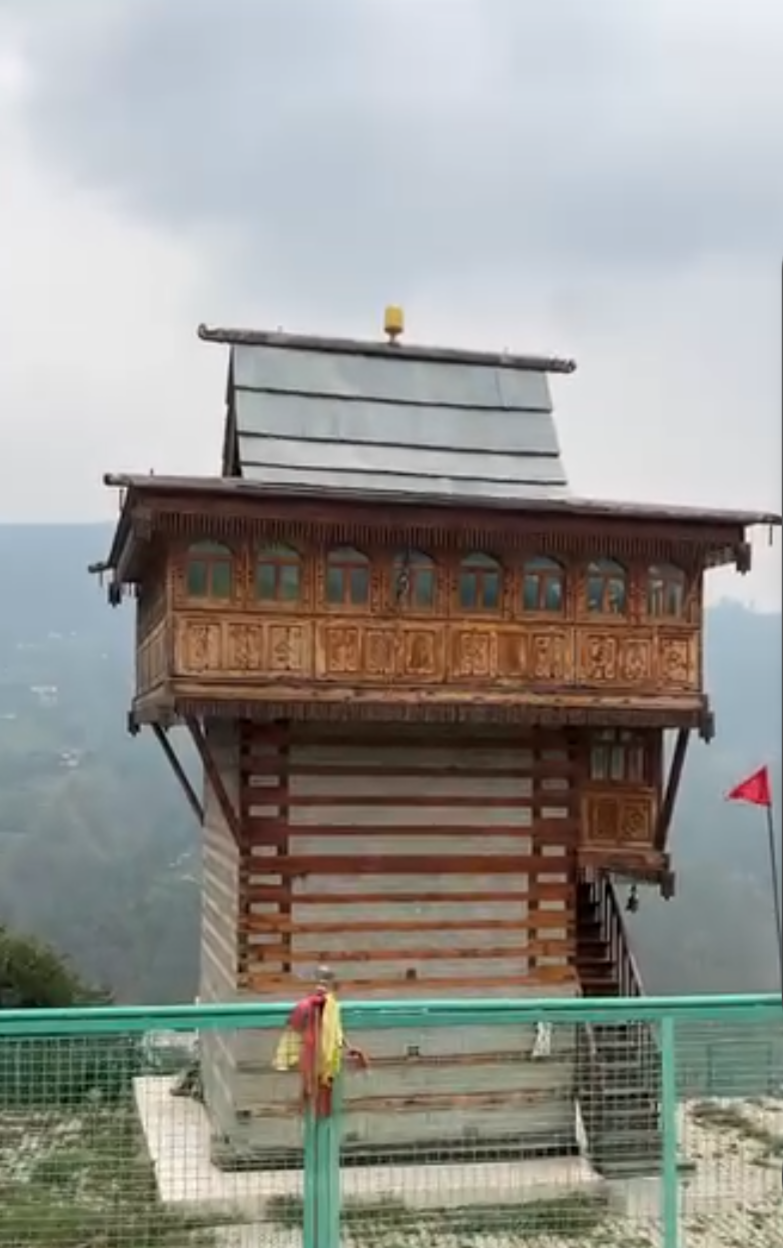
Naag Devta Temple, Bhabhar

Several traditional fairs and festivals are celebrated in Bamta and nearby villages, reflecting the region’s rich cultural and religious heritage. Some of the prominent ones include:

=== Bishu Fair ===
The Bishu fair is celebrated in Bamta and is associated with traditional folk dances, local songs and the martial-art-inspired game of Thoda (archery). The Bamta Bishu has attracted thousands of people from the surrounding region and includes traditional performances such as Thotha and Nati, as well as the participation of local deities.

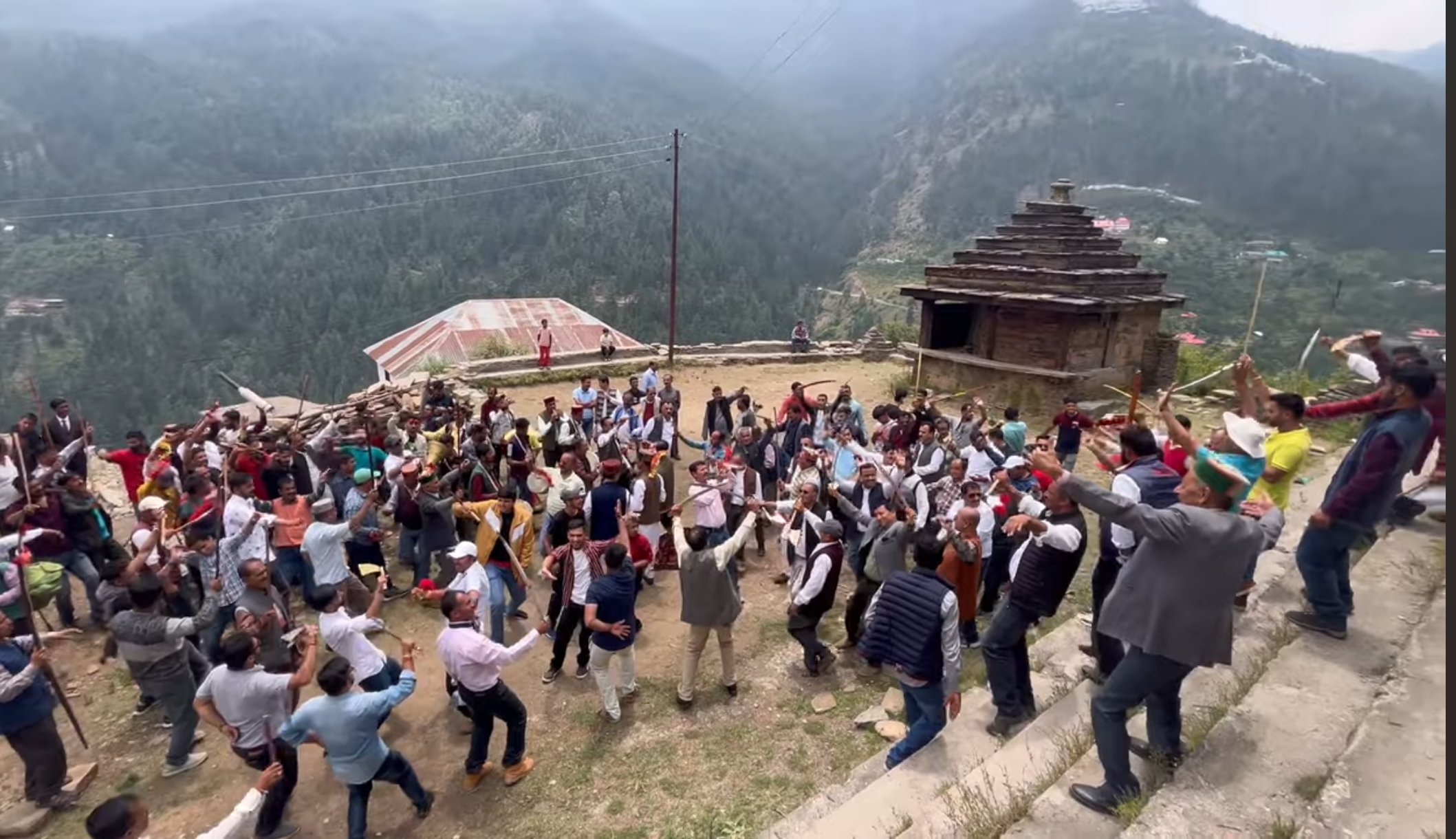
Bishu Fair, Bamta

=== Shawni Fair ===
The Shawni Fair is a traditional religious and cultural fair associated with the local deity of Pujarli in the Bamta area. The fair is marked by the public appearance (darshan) of the deity. Traditionally, villagers dressed in ceremonial attire and performed dances as part of the celebrations. Although this practice has become less common, a central ritual continues in which the deity is carried out of the temple in a palanquin (palki), around which devotees gather and perform traditional dances in reverence and celebration.

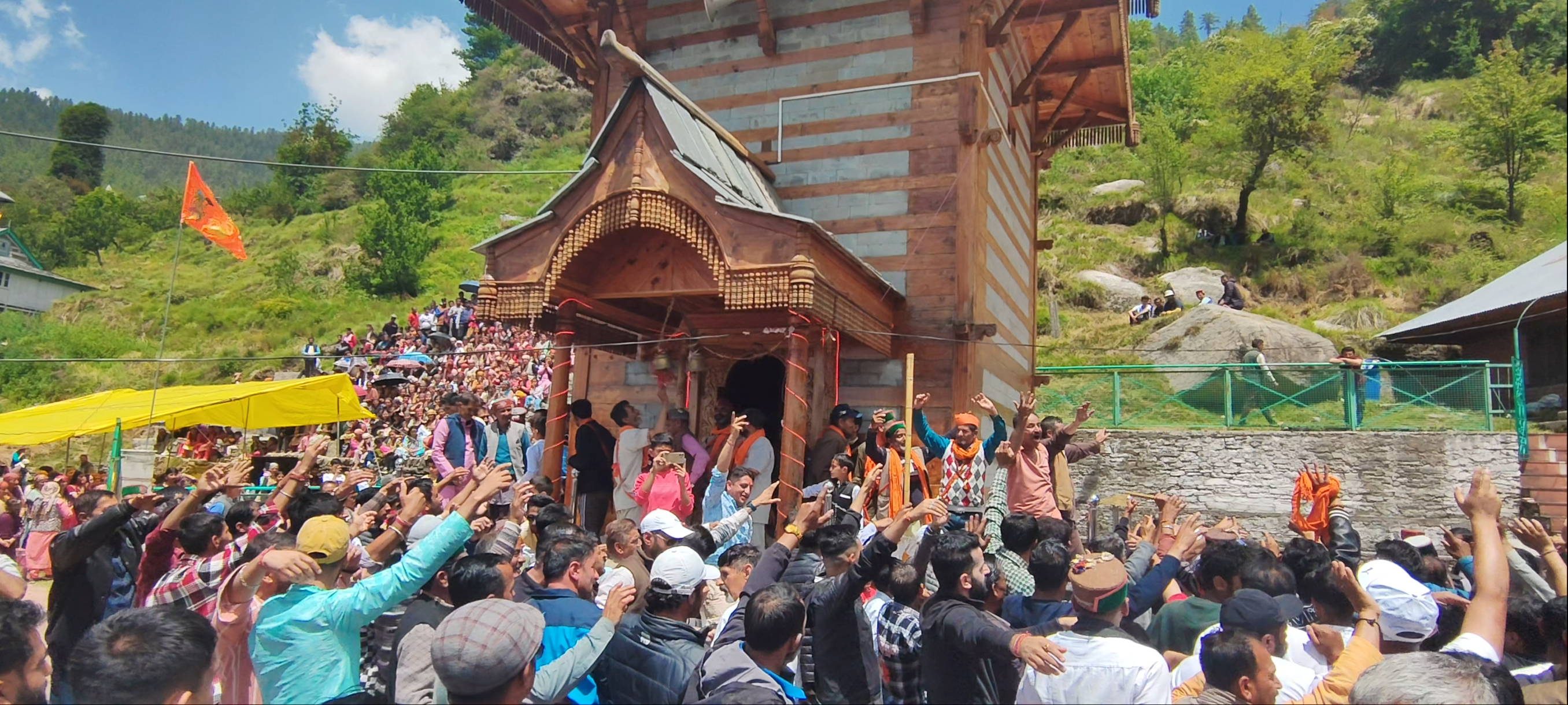
Shawni Fair, Pujarli (Bamta)

=== Jagra Fair ===
Jagra is a unique night festival observed across many villages. During the festival, the local deity visits nearby villages, symbolizing divine blessings, and villagers from surrounding areas gather in large numbers to participate in the celebrations. A palanquin carrying the idol of the deity is carried through the villages as part of the festival procession. Devotees participate in traditional dances, folk songs and rituals to honour the deity. The priest conducts a brief worship ceremony, followed by music from the village orchestra. Folk songs are sung throughout the night, and traditional meals are served to attendees. The festival concludes in the early morning as people return to their homes.

== Nearby attractions ==
Bamta and its surrounding villages offer natural landscapes, cultural heritage, sacred sites and trekking opportunities. Major attractions include:

- Bamta ka Basa – A locally significant historical site associated with the former Jubbal State.
- Gallu Mountain – Known for its scenic surroundings and hiking opportunities.
- Chhatar Hill – A viewpoint offering views of the surrounding Himalayan landscape.
- Kuppar Peak – A popular trekking destination through forested mountain terrain.
- Giri Ganga – A religious and trekking destination surrounded by deodar forests.

== Connectivity ==
Bamta is connected by road to Shimla, the capital city of Himachal Pradesh, and to other parts of Chaupal tehsil. The village can be reached via two primary routes:

- Via Chaupal: Approximately 135 km by road from Shimla, passing through Theog, Deha, and Chaupal town.
- Via Maraog: A shorter route of about 112 km, passing through Theog, Deha, and Maraog, and is commonly used during favorable weather conditions.

== Nearby places ==
Jubbal, Maraog, Chaupal, Kharapathar, Nerwa
