= Vidyanand Sarek =

Pahari litterateur and folk artist

- Born: 26 June 1941 (age 84); Sirmaur district, Rajgarh
- Awards: President's Award(2018); Padma Shri (2022)

Vidyanand Saraik (born 26 June 1941) is a Pahari litterateur and folk artist. In 2022, he was awarded Padma Shri by the Indian Government for his contribution in literature and folk.

== Early life ==
Sarek is born on June 26, 1941. He is from Rajgarh in Sirmaur district. At the age of 8 years he sang from All India Radio, New Delhi.

== Career ==
Sarek started his career in 1957 when he was in Class VIII and participated in a folk dance competition organised by All India Radio in Delhi.He has translated 51 poems of Rabindranath Tagore as part of a Central government project. He has also translated has translated 18 chapters of the Gita into Sirmauri language.

== Awards ==
- President's Award in 2018
- Padmashree in 2022
- Himachal Gaurav
