= Thoda (archery) =

Indian form of archery

Thoda is an Indian form of archery found in Himachal Pradesh, with elements of dance and music included. It is generally performed during various local festivals alongside other traditional games, and may be a symbolic representation of the war described in the Mahabharata. The aim of Thoda archery is for two opposing teams to shoot arrows at the legs of the other team (which are wrapped in thick cloth); Thoda competitions take place in Himachal Pradesh annually.

== History ==
Thoda is a form of martial art, which is a combination of traditional archery, dance, and music, and it is popular among the Khasas of Solan, Shimla, and Sirmour. A folk song from Thoda goes like "Bina Tikke Thakure Majhgaon ra Khoshia Deo Shirgul ri jubri de puja O lohu ra bhukha Khoshia." Literally meaning "I am the Lord Khashia of Majhgaon under no Raja or Thakur (quite independent and obeying no kings), have reached the arena of Shirgul god. I am hungry Khashia of the blood of my opponents". The game of Thoda is played a month after Diwali, specifically in the Jubbarhatti area located around Shimla. The game is played during the Anokhi Dali (unique tree) fair. Older locals of the area recall that the fair used to be organised to honour the olive tree species. The game of warfare is enacted with Thoda archery during baisakhi and is a part of the Rihali fair.

== Etymology ==
The name Thoda could refer to the round block of wood that is fixed ahead of the arrow to blunt it. Per community members, the name of Thoda is either derived from the word thod which means a raised platform or the word thud which means the lower limbs usually targeted during the fight.

== Rules ==
Two teams take part in the folk archery game, known as a pasha and saatha. The participants believe that they are the descendants of Pandavas and the Kauravas. Interestingly, here pasha signifies the five Pandava brothers and the saatha signifies the Kaurava brothers which they believe to have been sixty and not hundred brothers, as mentioned in the ancient Mahabharata text. Collectively, the teams are known as Kashiya and participants usually belong to the region's Thakur community.

The paasha group forms a chakravyuh formation that the saatha group has to break free. Participants wear a suthan with naltoo (short shirt) and pyjamas with patti (strip of cloth) on booth to avoid being hurt. The combat is accompanied by traditional music instruments such as nagara, dhol, and shehnai and local folk songs. The two teams comprise 500 participants each, most of whom are dancers. The teams stand 10 metres apart, and attempt to shoot each other below the knee. Points are deducted for shooting an opponent above the knee.

== Decline and Revival ==
In 2015, the then chief minister of Himachal Pradesh, Virbhadra Singh, announced that henceforth, Thoda would be included among other notable rural games such as kho-kho and kabaddi.

In 2022, a state-level Thoda competition was revived after a gap of 34 years by the Himachal Pradesh Thoda Games and Cultural Association. Around 48 teams participated to showcase their archery prowess.

In 2023, the Thoda archery took the centerstage during the celebration of the Pahari Divas festival.

== See also ==
- Dhanurveda, an account of ancient Indian archery
- Devaragutta Dasara festival, Hindu Vijayadashami festival involving bamboo stick fight
