= Dadahu =

Coordinates: 30°35′59.6″N 77°26′10.2″E

Dadahu is a small town in Sirmaur district of Himachal Pradesh in India. It has a population of about 17403 people. It is situated at a height of 640 meters from sea level. This town has a total area of 132km2.

The village has a vegetable market with garlic as one of the popular items which is exported to many other cities in India.

A BDO office opened here in 2025.
