= Maa Bhangayani Temple, Haripurdhar =

Hindu temple in Sirmour, India

Maa Bhangayani Temple
- Bhangayani mata

Religion
- Affiliation: Hinduism
- District: Sirmour
- Deity: Bhangayani Mata

Location
- State: Himachal Pradesh
- Country: India
- Geographic coordinates: 30.58°N 77.55°E

Maa Bhangayani is known to be the most powerful goddess of Himachal Pradesh's Sirmour district. According to the legends, Shirgul Maharaj was imprisoned by a Mughal king of that time who was frightened by Maharaj's spiritual powers. With the blessings of Maa Bhangyani, the king of Bagad and Guga peer helped him to gain freedom. This incident has been enlisted in golden chapters and since then Maa Bhangayani has been celebrated as god sister of Shirgul Mahadev.

== Accessibility ==
The Maa Bhangayani Temple is about 140 km from Shimla via Solan, Rajgarh it takes about 7 hours from this route. The road is narrow and not good during rainy season. Another route to reach this temple about 220 km from Shimla via Chaupal, it takes 12 hours from this route. The temple is also connected to Nahan via Sangrah.

== Season ==
Located at the foothills of lesser Himalayas, the Maa Bhangayani Temple, Haripurdhar, remains open to visitors all round year.
