= Shyama Sharma =

Indian politician (1947–2020)

Kumari Shyama Sharma
- Born: 25 March 1946; Saroga-Tikkar, Sirmaur district, Himachal Pradesh, India
- Died: 21 September 2020 Nahan Himachal Pradesh
- Education: LL.B. from DAV College, Dehradun; Masters in Political Science from Allahabad University;  Masters in Sociology from Agra University
- Occupations: Politician, Revolutionary, Advocate
- Known for: Minister of Law, Panchayati Raj, Food and Civil Supplies (1977–79)

Kumari Shyama Sharma (25 March 1946 – 21 September 2020) was an Indian politician and revolutionary. She served as Minister of Law, Panchayati Raj, Food and Civil Supplies, Himachal Pradesh Finance Commission (1977–79), Chairperson of Public Accounts Committee (1982–84), Chairperson of (1999), Vice Chairperson of Himachal Planning Board (2000-2003)

== Early life ==
She was born on 25 March 1946, in Village Saroga-Tikkar of Sirmaur. Shyama Sharma completed her Primary and Secondary Education from Rajmata Mandalsa Devi Kanya Vidyalaya (Government Girls School Nahan) and completed her LL.B. from DAV College Dehradun, Masters in Political Science from Allahabad University, Masters in Sociology from Agra University. After completing her education she started her career as an Advocate in District and Session Court Nahan.

== National emergency ==
On 25 June 1975, National Emergency was proclaimed in India during the regime of PM Indira Gandhi. Shyama Sharma led a massive protest of Labourers working in Yamuna Hydel Project of Khodri Majri. It was one of the biggest labour protests in India that demanded formation of Wage Board for labourers. At the same time Shyama was actively participating in J.P. Andolan led by Jaiprakash Narayan. On 19 December 1974, an order was issued to arrest Shyama Sharma and police came after searching for her in Khodri Majri. Seeing the police approaching towards her, Shyama jumped into Tons river in the midnight of 19 December and reached Jaunsar Bawar by crossing the river. From Jaunsar Bawar, she moved to Delhi hiding her identity in a disguise of a Sikh Person wearing Turban and artificial Beard and Moustache. After living one year underground in Delhi, Shyama Sharma was arrested on 30 June 1975 under MISA. In her own words, during the midnight of 29 June 1975, she was pasting the hand made posters on walls across Nahan town that were pointing out the dictatorship nature of the then government. As soon as she reached home early in the morning of 30 June 1975, police came to arrest her. A few days later a notice was issued to her family members to vacate the house because Government planning to seize all of their properties and may demolish them. But a question was raised in Parliament of India in this regard which stopped the seizure of their family properties. Shyama was kept in Central Jail Nahan in a cell where a life imprisoned was kept. In Jail, Shyama met many leaders like Shanta Kumar, Radha Raman Shastri, Mohindernath Sofat, Kanwar Durga Chand etc.

== Notable milestones ==
1974 Elected as Councillor to Nahan Municipal Committee

1975 Only Women in Himachal to be jailed during National Emergency

1977 First Female Member of Himachal Vidhan Sabha from District Sirmaur

1977-79 Minister for Law, Panchayati Raj, Food and Civil Supplies

1977 First Female Minister in Himachal Pradesh

1980 Elected From Nahan Constituency for consecutively second time

1980 Janta Party State President

1982-84 Chairperson of Public Accounts Committee

1989 Formed Himachal Krantikari Morcha which won 11 seats out of 17 contested in Himachal State Elections

1990 Elected with thumping majority from Nahan Constituency as Janta Dal candidate

1990 Supported Shanta Kumar led government with 11 MLAs of Himachal Krantikari Morcha

1995 Joined BJP

1998 played a vital role in forming the BJP government under Prof. Prem Kumar Dhumal

1999 Chairperson of State Finance Commission

2000 Vice - Chairperson Himachal Planning Board

2004 Star Campaigner for BJP in Himachal State Election

2011 Left BJP & founded Himachal Lokhit party along with Maheshwar Singh (Former MP)

2016 Merged HLP in BJP to strengthen BJP in Himachal Pradesh and actively participated in achieving Mission 50 + in 2017 in Himachal Pradesh

== Key activities ==
Led a massive protest of labourers in North India for the formation of Wage Board

Padyatra from Kanyakumari to Delhi along with former Prime Minister Chander Shekhar

Padyatra from Nahan to Delhi for Youth Unemployment & their moral rights.

Raised voices against the Corruption& ill practices in Government.

Founder Member Himachal Lokhit Party.

== Political career ==
In 1977, ten women were given ticket to contest Himachal Pradesh Assembly polls but nine women lost the election and only Shyama won the election with 71% of total votes of her Nahan Assembly constituency. She was then made Minister of Law, Panchayati Raj, Food and Civil Supplies in Government of Himachal Pradesh. In 1982 she again won assembly elections from Nahan and made Chairperson of Public Accounts Committee. At the same time she was the State President of Janta Party Himachal Unit. In 1990, Shyama Sharma for third time won election from Nahan. She was made National General Secretary of Janta Dal (S).

In 1991, Shyama was declared as a Lok Sabha candidate from Hoshiyarpur Lok Sabha Constituency. But due to some violence and terrorist attacks in Punjab, elections were cancelled. Then she was offered the post of Governor of Punjab by the then Prime Minister Chandrashekhar but she humbly declined the offer.

In 1995, Shyama joined Bhartiya Janta Party. In 1999, she was appointed Chairperson of Finance Commission of Himachal and in 2000, she was appointed Chairperson of Planning Board of Himachal Pradesh.

Shyama is now remembered as 'Iron Lady of Himachal'.

In 2017, Shyama stepped down from active politics. On 21 September 2020, Shyama Sharma died from COVID-19 in Nahan constituency in Sirmaur district.

== Family background ==
Shyama Sharma was born to a Landlord family. Her father Pandit Durga Dutt was a Rich Landlord in erstwhile Sirmaur State. He was honoured with the title of 'Rayees-e-Aazam’ by Maharaja of Sirmaur for having the highest number of lands. He introduced first ever Motor Transport in erstwhile Sirmaur state in year 1914 with four personal cars, four public buses and one lorry. He donated his lands worth Rupees Hundreds of Crores to Government for building Schools, Hospitals, Shelter Homes etc. In 1971, under Land Ceiling Act, Government of Himachal Pradesh acquired his 4579 Bighas of Lands in various parts of the state whose value was estimated ₹2100 Crore. The Land Ceiling Act affected many other big Landlords.

Shyama’s mother Savitri Devi was a daughter of a Landlord from District Dehradun. She owned a Tea Estate in Kaulagarh and many other valuable Farmhouses.

Their family history finds its traces in Jaisalmer. Their ancestors migrated from Kuldhara of Jaisalmer in early 1800s to Himachal. The family is the main priest of Mata Bhrageshwari (Bharagi) Devi Temple in Saroga.

Shyama lived in a joint family along with her elder brother Sukh Dev Sharma, who is a retired excise and taxation inspector who currently owns a private hotel in Nahan, elder sister Madhur Sharma, who was married to a bureaucrat, and younger brother Jai Dev Sharma, who served in Home Guard Force.

== Death ==
She died of COVID-19 in September 2020.
