= Haripurdhar =

Town in Sirmour, Himachal Pradesh, India

Coordinates: 30.770°N 77.531°E

Haripurdhar is a small town in Sirmour, Himachal Pradesh, India. The town is situated on a high ridge overlooking a deep valley at an altitude of 2500 metres above sea level. It was earlier known as 'Dungbhangayani' and was the summer capital of Sirmour. In the months of May and June temperatures reach 0 to 5°C. In winters there is a view of snowfall. The town has three or four hotels and a guest house. A temple is situated on the border of Shimla and Sirmour. There are around 30 rooms with basic facilities in the temple premises. Maa Bhangayani Temple. There are many old temples of many deities in the adjoining villages.

== History ==
Haripurdhar was earlier known as ‘Dungbhangayani’. It was formerly the summer capital of the Sirmour. Situated on a crest of Haripur hill like a silent sentinel, there is a fort named “Killa” that was built on this mountain range by the rulers of incipient Sirmour State. It was mainly meant to guard the state outskirts with the neighboring Jubbal state as there were regular boundary disputes between the two states and there was unusual push into each other's territory. It has fallen into abandonment and the part which is still livable is used by the Forest Department as the forester's headquarters.
