= Rajgarh, Himachal Pradesh =

Rajgarh
- Town
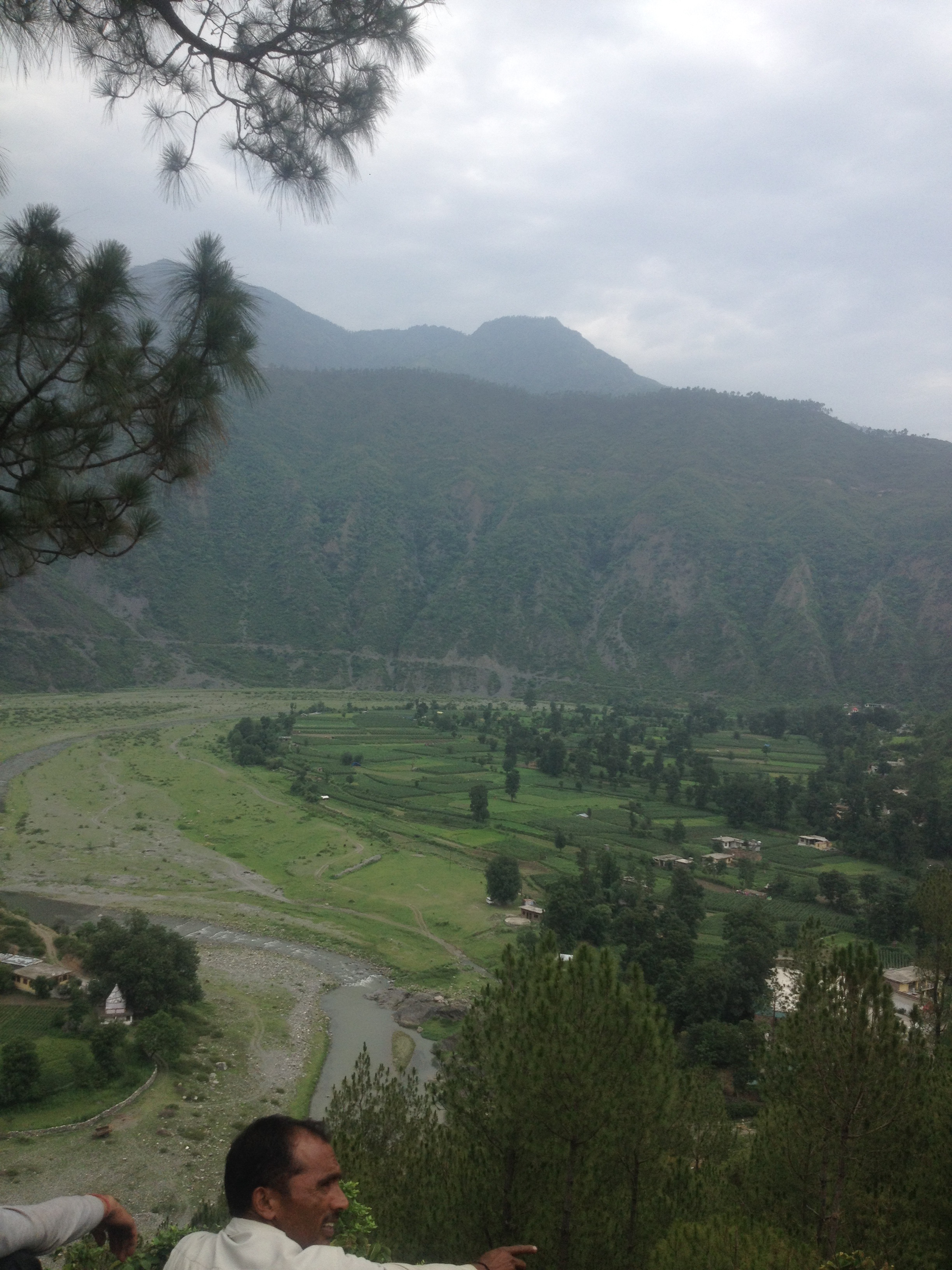
- Giri River valley near Rajgarh town

- Location in Himachal Pradesh, India Rajgarh (India)
- Coordinates: 30.85°N 77.3°E
- Country: India
- State: Himachal Pradesh
- District: Sirmaur
- Elevation: 1,555 m (5,102 ft)

Population (2005)
  - Total: 4,526

Languages
  - Official: Hindi
  - Native: Sirmauri
- Time zone: UTC+5:30 (IST)
- PIN: 173101
- Telephone code: 91 1799
- Vehicle registration: HP- HP 16

Rajgarh is a town and a nagar panchayat in Sirmaur district in the Indian state of Himachal Pradesh. It was a Princely State ruled by Raja of Raghuvanshi lineage.

== Geography ==
Rajgarh is located at 30.85°N 77.3°E. It has an average elevation of 1,555 metres (5,102 feet).

== Demographics ==
As of 2001 India census, Rajgarh had a population of 2,527. Males constitute 56% of the population and females 44%. Rajgarh has an average literacy rate of 79%, higher than the national average of 59.5%; male literacy is 83%, and female literacy is 73%. 11% of the population is under 6 years of age.

Popularly known as the Peach valley, Rajgarh is a green valley in Sirmour district. Rajgarh has two sub-divisions, namely Rajgarh and Sarahan, the latter of which is also a valley of Sirmaur. Rajgarh was ruled by the chiefs of Raghuvanshi lineage, who used the title Maharaja. Rajgarh is about 40 km from Solan. At Rajgarh, rest houses belonging to the PWD and Forest Department are available for visitors, besides private hotels and guest houses.

Lord Shiva is affectionately called Lord Shirgul by some locals. The people of Rajgarh are religious and worship Shiva Durga. The local Shaya temple of Lord Shiva a

The adjacent Habban conr, kail, baan and deodar forests, as well as orchards of apples and peaches. The climate is moderate year-round and in winter, Habban occasionally has snow. Habban is about 70 km from Solan via Yashwant Nagar and Rajgarh. The town of Haripurdhar is about a two-hour journey from Rajgarh and is famous for the Bhangayani Temple, dedicated to a god sister of Lord Shiva, the principal deity whose seat is at Churdhar. PWD rest houses and a trekker's hut are available for travellers, besides the Sarai in the temple. Nohradhar, which lies halfway between Rajgarh and Haripurdhar, is a base for trekking to Churdhar, with routes including Sailpaw-Dokhta-Churdhar (7 km), Haripurdhar-Churdhar (17 km), Nohradhar-Churdhar (14 km), Sarahan-Churdhar (7 km), and Habban-Churdhar (15 km).

== Related links ==
- Maa Bhangayani Temple, Haripurdhar
- Churdhar Sanctuary
- Baru Sahib
