= Sadanand Chauhan =

Indian politician

Sadanand Chauhan was an Indian politician and member of the Lok Janshakti Party. Chauhan was a member of the Himachal Pradesh Legislative Assembly from the Nahan constituency in Sirmaur district.
