= Rajpur Daghali =

Rajpura
- Village
- Location in Himachal Pradesh, India Rajpura (India)
- Coordinates: 30.5428°N 77.7291°E
- Country: India
- State: Himachal Pradesh
- District: Sirmaur
- Time zone: UTC+5:30 (IST)
- PIN: 173025

Rajpura is a small village in Sirmaur District, Himachal Pradesh, India. It is situated in the hills near Bhagani, at a distance of around 20 km from Paonta Sahib.

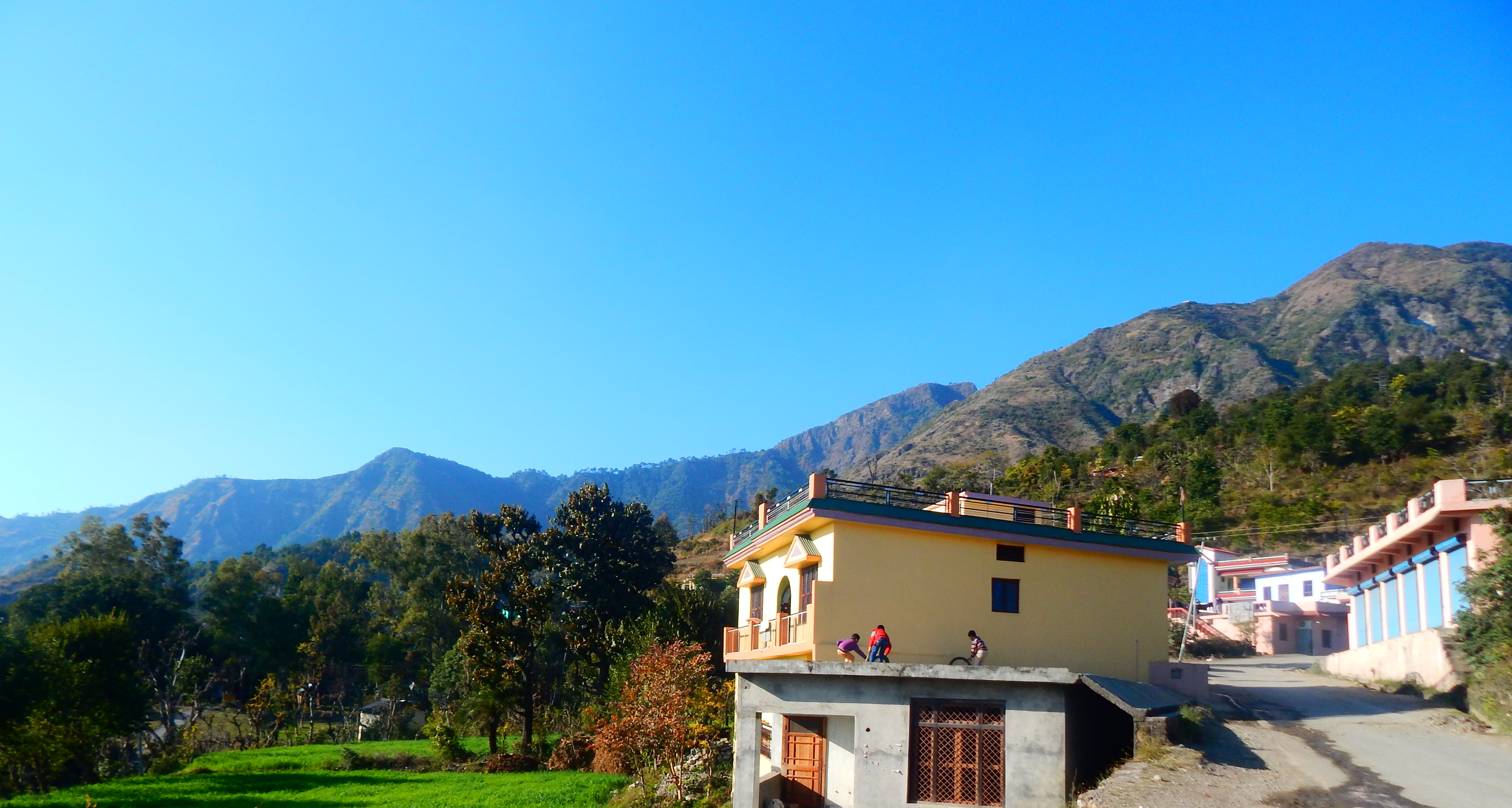
Scenic View near Rajpur Dhagli

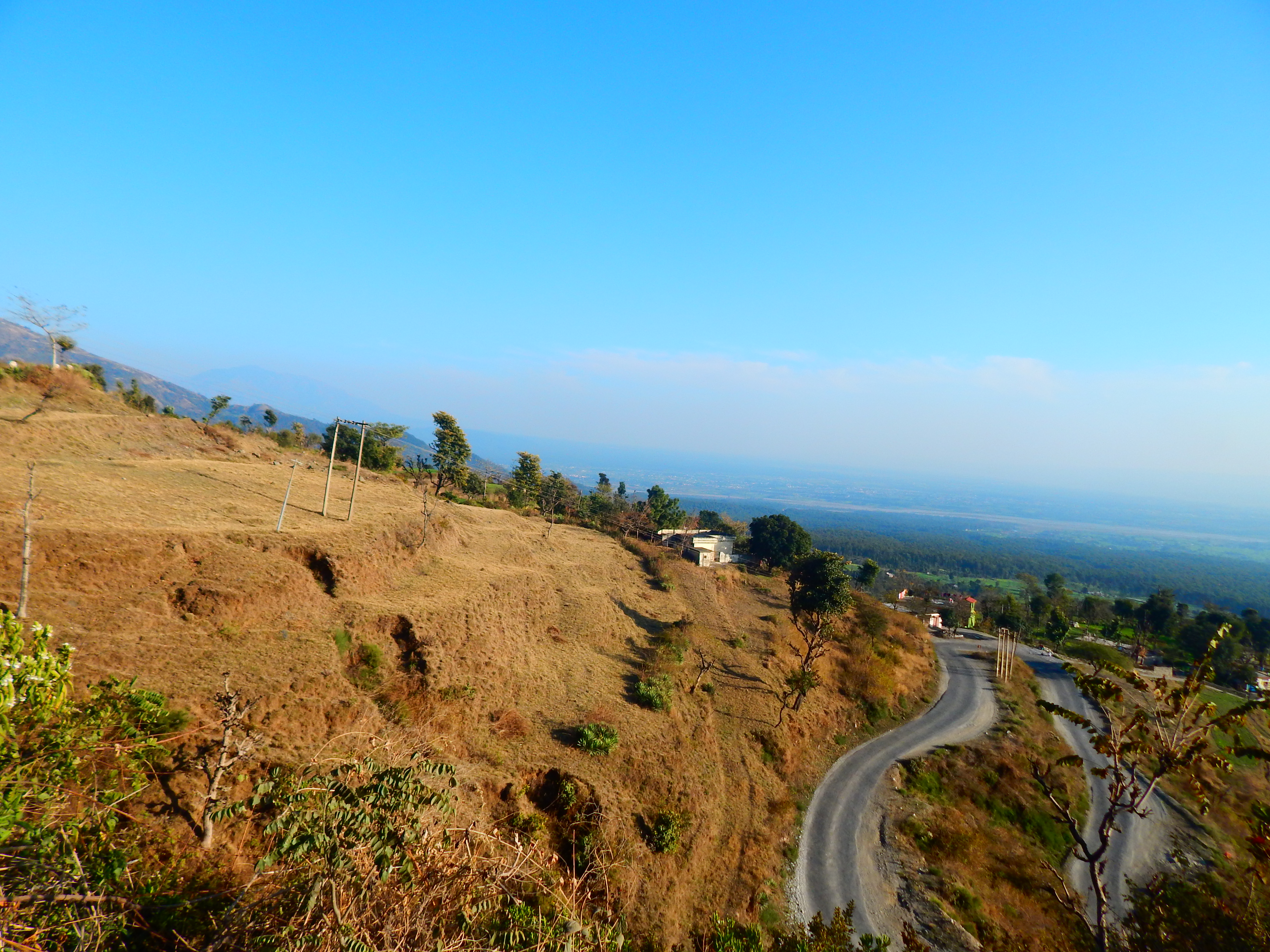
Scenic View from Rajpur Dhagli
