= Ajay Solanki =

Indian politician

Ajay Solanki (born 1971) is an Indian politician from Himachal Pradesh. He is an MLA from Nahan Assembly constituency in Sirmaur District. He won the 2022 Himachal Pradesh Legislative Assembly election representing the Indian National Congress.

== Early life and education ==
Solanki is from Nahan, Sirmaur District, Himachal Pradesh. He is the son of Madan Pal Singh. He passed Class 12 and later finished his B.A. first year in 1993 at Government College Kotshera, Shimla, but later discontinued his studies. His wife is a government teacher at Government Senior Secondary School, Nahan.

== Career ==
Solanki won from Nahan Assembly constituency representing the Indian National Congress in the 2022 Himachal Pradesh Legislative Assembly election. He polled 35,291 votes and defeated his nearest rival, Rajeev Bindal of the Bharatiya Janata Party, by a margin of 1,639 votes. He lost the 2017 Himachal Pradesh Legislative Assembly election to Rajeev Bindal of BJP by a narrow margin of 3,990 votes.
