= Kamrao =

Kamrao/kamrou/kamrau is a village in India. It is a tehsil of Sirmaur district. It is near Paonta Sahib in the Indian state of Himachal Pradesh. KAMRAU is a village in a shape of om.

== Economy ==
The main occupation of the local population is agriculture and limestone mining

== Demographics ==
More than 355 families and 2200 people live here. Regional villages of Kamrau are Basog, Khjiyar, Parlo, Devlan, Shukara, Timbi, Guila, Shildi, Khuinl, Chnjauta, Banana, Baldwa, Bohl and Tilordhar. These villages are part of Kamrau Panchayat.

== Geography ==
This village is the biggest village of the trans-giri (giri-paar) area of Sirmour district. It is in shillai constituency. It is believed that it was Asia's richest village due to its rich resource of limestone. Bagandhar, Tilordhar and Bohaldhar are valleys on which snow falls in winter. Tilordhar is famous for Tibetan refugees, a Buddhist monastery and a Shiva temple. There is a cold water spring three kilometers away from Kamrau.
