= Habban Valley =

Village in Himachal Pradesh, India

Habban Valley is a village in Himachal Pradesh which is 70 km from Solan via Rajgarh.

== Geography ==
The Habban Valley is surrounded by forests of deodar and is located in the hills of Sirmaur, a lush green village that is 6770 ft in elevation and is 70 km from Solan. Direct buses are available from Shimla, Solan, and Rajgarh but personal vehicles are also driven within the area.

The weather is usually pleasant around the year. Among the local wildlife are peacocks, deer, tigers, bears, kakkar, kastura and ghol. There are also various trails within Habban Valley, including a 7-km trek to Banalidhar and a 15-km trek to Churdhar. Habban is 10 km away from the village of Shaya, which contains the shrine of the widely revered Shirgul Devta.
