= Nahan Assembly constituency =

Legislative Assembly constituency in Himachal Pradesh State, India

Coordinates: 30.56°N 77.29°E

Nahan
- Constituency No. 56 for the Himachal Pradesh Legislative Assembly

Constituency details
- Country: India
- Region: North India
- State: Himachal Pradesh
- District: Sirmaur
- Lok Sabha constituency: Shimla
- Established: 1951
- Total electors: 85,818
- Reservation: None

Member of Legislative Assembly
- 14th Himachal Pradesh Legislative Assembly
- Incumbent Ajay Solanki
- Party: Indian National Congress
- Elected year: 2022

Nahan Assembly constituency is one of the 68 assembly constituencies of Himachal Pradesh a northern Indian state. Nahan is also part of Shimla Lok Sabha constituency.

== Members of the Legislative Assembly ==
Year	Member	Picture	Party
1951	Tapinder Singh		Indian National Congress
1967	Tapinder Singh		Indian National Congress
1972	Sunder Singh Thakar		Indian National Congress
1977	Shyama Sharma		Janata Party
1982	Shyama Sharma		Janata Party
1985	Ajay Bahadur Singh		Indian National Congress
1990	Shyama Sharma		Janata Dal
1993	Kush Parmar		Indian National Congress
1998	Kush Parmar		Indian National Congress
2003	Sadanand Chauhan		Lok Janshakti Party
2007	Kush Parmar		Indian National Congress
2012	Rajeev Bindal		Bharatiya Janata Party
2017	Rajeev Bindal		Bharatiya Janata Party
2022	Ajay Solanki		Indian National Congress

== Election results ==
=== Assembly Election 2022 ===
2022 Himachal Pradesh Legislative Assembly election: Nahan
Party	Candidate	Votes	%	±%
INC	Ajay Solanki	35,291	50.08%	▲5.97
BJP	Dr. Rajeev Bindal	33,652	47.75%	▼2.73
NOTA	Nota	470	0.67%	▼0.28
AAP	Sunil Sharma	387	0.55%	New
Margin of victory		1,639	2.33%	▼4.06
Turnout		70,475	82.12%	▼1.21
Registered electors		85,818		▲14.39
INC gain from BJP		Swing	▼0.41	

=== Assembly Election 2017 ===
2017 Himachal Pradesh Legislative Assembly election: Nahan
Party	Candidate	Votes	%	±%
BJP	Dr. Rajeev Bindal	31,563	50.48%	▲2.85
INC	Ajay Solanki	27,573	44.10%	▲20.46
CPI(M)	Vishwanath	836	1.34%	New
BSP	Jai Chand	689	1.10%	▼0.75
NOTA	None of the Above	594	0.95%	New
Margin of victory		3,990	6.38%	▼17.61
Turnout		62,522	83.33%	▲4.61
Registered electors		75,025		▲10.51
BJP hold		Swing	▲2.85	

=== Assembly Election 2012 ===
2012 Himachal Pradesh Legislative Assembly election: Nahan
Party	Candidate	Votes	%	±%
BJP	Dr. Rajeev Bindal	25,459	47.63%	▲14.90
INC	Kush Parmar	12,635	23.64%	▼10.72
LJP	Sadanand Chauhan	8,273	15.48%	▼14.57
HLC	Shyama Sharma	5,240	9.80%	New
BSP	Kutub Deen	990	1.85%	▲0.36
SP	Vijay Kumar	792	1.48%	▲0.74
Margin of victory		12,824	23.99%	▲22.36
Turnout		53,447	78.73%	▲2.28
Registered electors		67,890		▲13.48
BJP gain from INC		Swing	▲13.27	

=== Assembly Election 2007 ===
2007 Himachal Pradesh Legislative Assembly election: Nahan
Party	Candidate	Votes	%	±%
INC	Kush Parmar	15,714	34.36%	▲2.29
BJP	Shyama Sharma	14,968	32.73%	▲8.53
LJP	Sadanand Chauhan	13,741	30.05%	▼4.88
BSP	Sushant Singh	683	1.49%	New
SP	Vinod Kumar	339	0.74%	New
Rashtriya Garib Dal	Ram Kumar	278	0.61%	New
Margin of victory		746	1.63%	▼1.23
Turnout		45,731	76.44%	▼1.70
Registered electors		59,823		▲12.23
INC gain from LJP		Swing	▼0.57	

=== Assembly Election 2003 ===
2003 Himachal Pradesh Legislative Assembly election: Nahan
Party	Candidate	Votes	%	±%
LJP	Sadanand Chauhan	14,551	34.93%	New
INC	Kush Parmar	13,360	32.07%	▼10.09
BJP	Shyama Sharma	10,079	24.20%	▼9.45
HVC	Virender Sharma	1,582	3.80%	▲1.28
CPI(M)	Jasmat Singh	827	1.99%	New
Independent	Durga Ram	740	1.78%	New
Independent	Aman Deep	516	1.24%	New
Margin of victory		1,191	2.86%	▼5.66
Turnout		41,655	78.21%	▲8.26
Registered electors		53,303		▲6.13
LJP gain from INC		Swing	▼7.23	

=== Assembly Election 1998 ===
1998 Himachal Pradesh Legislative Assembly election: Nahan
Party	Candidate	Votes	%	±%
INC	Kush Parmar	14,798	42.16%	▼6.46
BJP	Shyama Sharma	11,808	33.64%	▲12.97
JD	Sadanand Chauhan	7,230	20.60%	▼7.10
HVC	Virender Sharma	885	2.52%	New
Shivsena	Parkash Chand	320	0.91%	New
Margin of victory		2,990	8.52%	▼12.41
Turnout		35,099	71.32%	▼4.45
Registered electors		50,223		▲14.01
INC hold		Swing	▼6.46	

=== Assembly Election 1993 ===
1993 Himachal Pradesh Legislative Assembly election: Nahan
Party	Candidate	Votes	%	±%
INC	Kush Parmar	15,922	48.62%	▲20.66
JD	Shyama Sharma	9,070	27.70%	▼24.21
BJP	Vinay Kumar	6,769	20.67%	New
Independent	Shiv Raj Singh	584	1.78%	New
Independent	Raghu Nandan Singh	324	0.99%	New
Margin of victory		6,852	20.93%	▼3.02
Turnout		32,745	74.94%	▼0.45
Registered electors		44,050		▲8.16
INC gain from JD		Swing	▼3.29	

=== Assembly Election 1990 ===
1990 Himachal Pradesh Legislative Assembly election: Nahan
Party	Candidate	Votes	%	±%
JD	Shyama Sharma	15,810	51.91%	New
INC	Ajay Bahadur Singh	8,516	27.96%	▼25.80
Independent	Din Dayal	4,057	13.32%	New
Independent	Bhagwant Singh	1,301	4.27%	New
Independent	Ramesh Kumar	396	1.30%	New
Independent	Liaquat Ali	282	0.93%	New
Margin of victory		7,294	23.95%	▲16.43
Turnout		30,457	75.53%	▼0.53
Registered electors		40,725		▲28.19
JD gain from INC		Swing	▼1.85	

=== Assembly Election 1985 ===
1985 Himachal Pradesh Legislative Assembly election: Nahan
Party	Candidate	Votes	%	±%
INC	Ajay Bahadur Singh	12,864	53.76%	▲25.38
JP	Shyama Sharma	11,065	46.24%	▼14.57
Margin of victory		1,799	7.52%	▼24.92
Turnout		23,929	76.25%	▲3.90
Registered electors		31,770		▲6.75
INC gain from JP		Swing		

=== Assembly Election 1982 ===
1982 Himachal Pradesh Legislative Assembly election: Nahan
Party	Candidate	Votes	%	±%
JP	Shyama Sharma	12,926	60.81%	▼11.13
INC	Sunder Singh	6,032	28.38%	▲1.23
BJP	Ved Mittar	1,598	7.52%	New
Independent	Chandra Mani	291	1.37%	New
Independent	Mohd. Gulzar	202	0.95%	New
Independent	Sadanand Chauhan	110	0.52%	New
Margin of victory		6,894	32.43%	▼12.36
Turnout		21,256	72.44%	▲7.95
Registered electors		29,762		▲14.44
JP hold		Swing	▼11.13	

=== Assembly Election 1977 ===
1977 Himachal Pradesh Legislative Assembly election: Nahan
Party	Candidate	Votes	%	±%
JP	Shyama Sharma	11,874	71.94%	New
INC	Sunder Singh	4,481	27.15%	▼43.81
Independent	Gian Chand Chauhan	151	0.91%	New
Margin of victory		7,393	44.79%	▼7.00
Turnout		16,506	64.38%	▲10.64
Registered electors		26,006		▲13.07
JP gain from INC		Swing	▲0.98	

=== Assembly Election 1972 ===
1972 Himachal Pradesh Legislative Assembly election: Nahan
Party	Candidate	Votes	%	±%
INC	Sunder Singh Thakar	8,621	70.95%	▲18.52
ABJS	Gyan Chand Chauhan	2,328	19.16%	New
LRP	Ishwar Chandra Gupta	1,201	9.88%	New
Margin of victory		6,293	51.79%	▲46.93
Turnout		12,150	54.78%	▼2.99
Registered electors		23,000		▼7.94
INC hold		Swing	▲18.52	

=== Assembly Election 1967 ===
1967 Himachal Pradesh Legislative Assembly election: Nahan
Party	Candidate	Votes	%	±%
INC	Tapinder Singh	7,312	52.43%	▼14.99
Independent	J. Singh	6,633	47.57%	New
Margin of victory		679	4.87%	▼42.19
Turnout		13,945	58.40%	▲12.91
Registered electors		24,984		▲61.35
INC hold		Swing	▼14.99	

=== Assembly Election 1952 ===
1952 Himachal Pradesh Legislative Assembly election: Nahan
Party	Candidate	Votes	%	±%
INC	Tapinder Singh	4,479	67.42%	New
Independent	Mohan Lall	1,353	20.37%	New
Independent	Bishan Singh	811	12.21%	New
Margin of victory		3,126	47.06%	
Turnout		6,643	42.90%	
Registered electors		15,484		
INC win (new seat)				

== See also ==
- List of constituencies of the Himachal Pradesh Legislative Assembly
- Nahan
- Sirmaur district
