= Nerwa, Shimla =

Village in Himachal Pradesh

Nerwa Nerua
- Tehsil
- Location in Himachal Pradesh, India
- Coordinates: 30.917°N 77.641°E
- Country: Chaupal India
- State: Himachal Pradesh
- District: Chaupal
- Elevation: 1,170 m (3,840 ft)

Population
  - Total: 2,293

Languages
  - Official: Hindi
  - Regional: Mahasu Pahari (Bishashau)
- Time zone: UTC+5:30 (IST)
- PIN: 171210
- Telephone code: 01783
- Sex ratio: 3:2 ♂/♀
- Literacy: 100%%
- Lok Sabha constituency: Shimla
- Climate: moderate (Köppen)

Nerwa (Nerua) is a tehsil in Shimla District of Himachal Pradesh, India. In the Indian administrative system, a tehsil is a sub-division of a district responsible for the administration and revenue collection of a specific area within the district. It plays a crucial role in the local governance structure, contributing significantly to the development and administration of its local community.

According to the 2011 census information, the sub-district code for Nerua Block (CD) is 00187, covering a total area of 356 km^{2}. Nerua tehsil has a population of 36,517 people, with a population density of 103 inhabitants per square kilometer. The sub-district comprises about 6,804 houses.

In terms of literacy, 63.87% of the population in Nerua tehsil is literate. Among them, 70.32% are males, and 57.06% are females. There are approximately 244 villages in Nerua tehsil, and you can explore them in the Nerua tehsil villages list, which includes information about gram panchayats and the nearest towns.
