= Dhanurveda =

Sanskrit treatise on warfare and archery

Information
- Author: Bhrigu or Vishvamitra or Bharadwaja
- Language: Sanskrit
- Period: 1100 – 800 BCE

Dhanurveda (धनुर्वेद) (transl. Science of archery / Knowledge of archery) is a Sanskrit treatise on warfare and archery, traditionally regarded as an upaveda attached to Yajurveda (1100 – 800 BCE) and attributed either to Bhrigu or Vishvamitra or Bharadwaja. It is one among the four upavedas to Vedas (along with Ayurveda, Gandharvaveda, and Sthāpatyaveda).

== History ==
Dhanurveda, a section of the Vedas (1700 BCE – 1100 BCE), contains references to martial arts. The Charanavyuha, authored by Shaunaka, mentions four upaveda (applied Vedas). Included among them are archery (dhanurveda) and military sciences (shastrashastra), the mastery of which was the duty (dharma) of the warrior class. Kings usually belonged to the kshatriya (warrior) class and thus served as army commanders. They typically practiced archery, wrestling, boxing, and swordsmanship as part of their education.

Vedic hymns in the Rigveda, Yajurveda, and Atharvaveda lay emphasis on the use of the bow and arrow. The second Veda, the Yajurveda, contains Dhanurveda (dhanus "bow" and veda "knowledge"), which was an ancient treatise on the science of archery and its use in warfare. Several works of ancient literature refer to Dhanurveda. The Viṣṇu Purāṇa refers to it as one of the eighteen branches of knowledge, and the Mahābhārata mentions that it has sutras like other vedas. Śukranīti describes it as that "upaveda of yajurveda" which has five arts or practical aspects.

Dhanurveda describes the practices and uses of archery, bow- and arrow-making, military training, and rules of engagement. The treatise discusses martial arts in relation to the training of warriors, charioteers, cavalry, elephant warriors, infantry etc. It was considered a sin to shoot a warrior in the back and to fight more than one warrior at a time. The bow used in the Vedic period were called danush, and were described in detail in the Vedas. The curved shape of the bow is called vakra in Artha Veda. The bowstring was called jya, and was strung only when needed. An arrow was called an iṣu, and a quiver was called an iṣudhi.

Many of the popular sports mentioned in the Vedas and the epics have their origins in military training, such as boxing (musti-yuddha), wrestling (maladwandwa), chariot-racing (rathachalan), horse-riding (aswa-rohana) and archery (dhanurvidya).

Other scattered references to fighting arts in medieval texts include the Kamandakiya Nitisara (c. 8th century ed. Manmatha Nath Dutt, 1896), the Nitivakyamrta by Somadeva Suri (10th century), the Yuktikalpataru of Bhoja (11th century) and the Manasollasa of Somesvara III (12th century).

== Agni Purana ==
One of the earliest extant manuals of Indian martial arts is in the Agni Purana (dated to between the 8th and the 11th century). The Dhanurveda section of the Agni Purana spans chapters 248–251, categorizing weapons into thrown and unthrown classes and further dividing them into sub-classes. It catalogues training into five major divisions for different types of warriors: charioteers, elephant-riders, horsemen, infantry, and wrestlers.

The work describes nine asanas (stances) for fighting:

- samapada (“holding the feet even”): standing in closed ranks with the feet put together (248.9)
- vaiśākha: standing erect with the feet apart (248.10)
- maṇḍala (“disk”): standing with the knees apart, arranged in the shape of a flock of geese (248.11)
- ālīḍha (“licked, polished”): bending the right knee with the left foot pulled back (248.12)
- pratyālīḍha: bending the left knee with the right foot pulled back (248.13)
- jāta (“origin”): placing the right foot straight with the left foot perpendicular, the ankles being five fingers apart (248.14)
- daṇḍāyata (“extended staff”): keeping the right knee bent with the left leg straight, or vice versa; called vikaṭa (“dreadful”) if the two legs are two palm-lengths apart (248.16)
- sampuṭa (“hemisphere”) (248.17)
- swastika (“well-being”): keeping the feet 16 fingers apart and lifting the feet a little (248.19)

A more detailed discussion of archery technique follows.

The section concludes by listing the names of actions or “deeds” possible with various weapons, including 32 positions to be taken with sword and shield (khaḍgacarmavidhau); 11 techniques for using a rope in fighting, 5 “acts in the rope operation,” lists of “deeds” pertaining to the chakram (war-quoit), the spear, the tomara (iron club), the gada (mace), the axe, the hammer, the bhindipāla or laguda, the vajra, the dagger, the slingshot, and a bludgeon or cudgel. A short passage near the end addresses larger concerns of warfare and explains the various uses of war elephants and men. The text concludes with a description of how to appropriately send the well-trained fighter off to war.

== Extant texts ==
The extant Dhanurvedic text is relatively late, found in the Agni Purana (chapters 249–252) which is no earlier than eighth century. It is an edited version of earlier manuals, containing techniques and instructions for kings preparing for war and training his soldiers. It includes the 5 training divisions — warriors on chariots, elephants, cavalry, infantry, and wrestlers; and five types of weapons — projected with machines (arrows and missiles), thrown by hand (spear), cast by hands and retained (noose), permanently held in hands (sword), and the hands themselves. The text states that Brahmins and Kshatriyas are permitted to teach martial arts and other castes can be soldiers.

Another extant Dhanurveda-Samhita dates to the mid-14th century, by Brhat Sarngadhara Paddhati (ed. 1888).

The Ausanasa Dhanurveda Sankalanam dates to the late 16th century. A 17th-century Dhanurveda-samhita is attributed to Vasistha.

== See also ==
- Thoda (archery)
