= Devaragutta Dasara festival =

Hindu festival from Andhra Pradesh, India

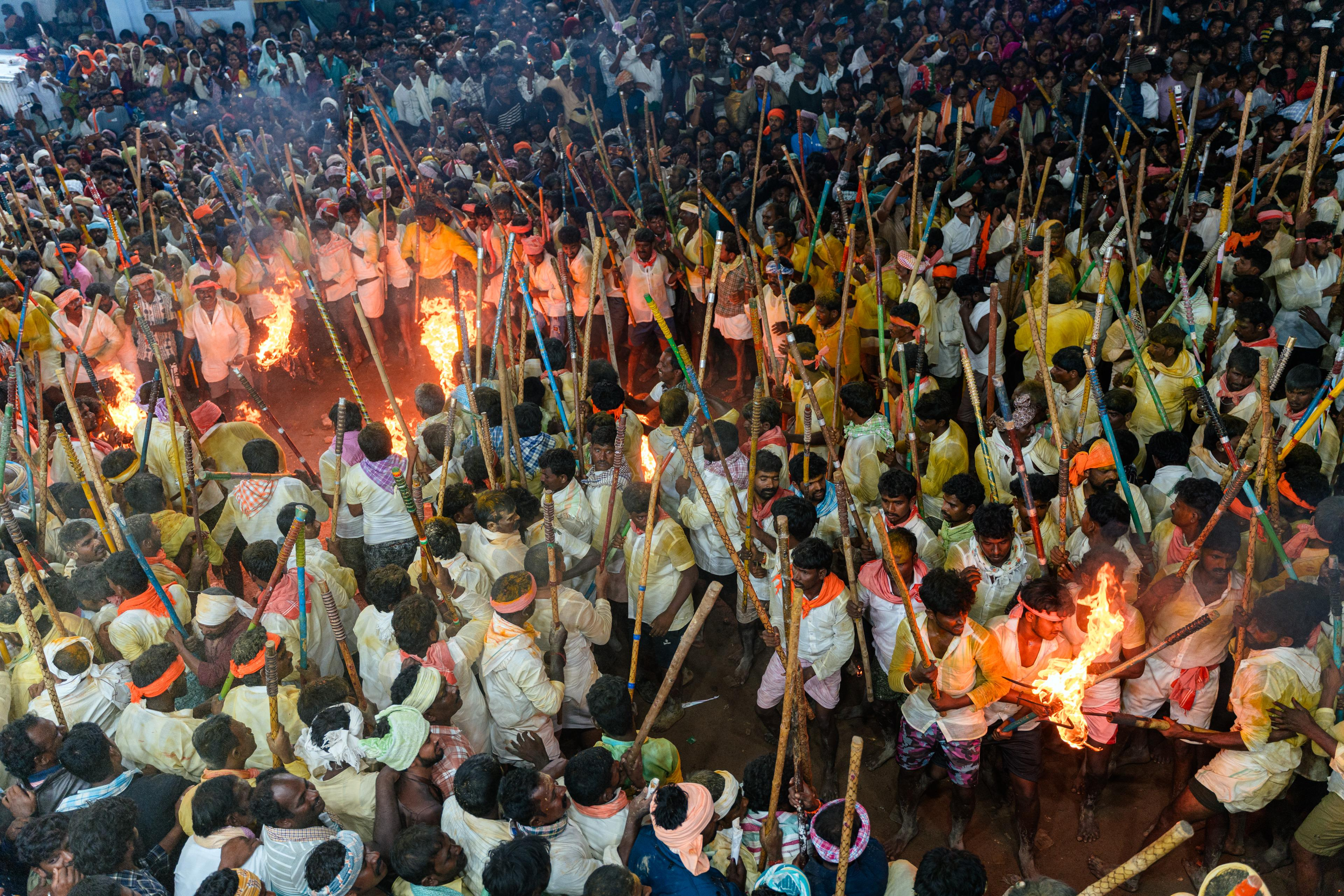
The crowd at the festival on October third, 2025

Devaragutta Dasara festival is a Hindu festival celebrated during Dasara in Devaragutta village near Neraniki village in, Holagunda mandal, Kurnool district of Andhra Pradesh, India. It is a violent form of celebration where people from five villages fight with long bamboo sticks. Many devotees who participate in the fight get injured.

== History ==
As per legends, Mani and Mallasura were two demons who lived in the hillock areas of Devaragutta. The demons regularly tortured the saints performing penance. The saints prayed to Lord Parameswara and Parvathi to save them from the demons. On the night of Vijayadashami, the lord took the form of moola virat in Kurmavatharam and appeared on the Devaragutta hillock to slay the demons. While dying, the demons prayed to be given human sacrifices every year which the lord denied and instead gave a fistful of blood in Rakshapada.

In October of 2025, four participants in the fighting were killed when a stampede broke out during the rituals. The same incident left over 100 people injured, several critically

== Rituals ==
Popularly known as the Banni festival of Sri Mala Malleswara Swamy temple in Devaragutta, it spans eleven days and culminates on the day of Vijaydashami where people from five villages form two separate groups to fight with each other for the purpose of claiming the idol of the deity.

The head priest commences the festival with Ganapati puja, Kankanadharana, Nischithartha for Mala Malleswara Swamy and Parvati, and Dwajarohana. Then the devotees offer prayers to Sri Mala Malleswara Swamy and Parvati, and carry the idols of the deities down the hillock. Thousands of devotees from the villages of Kothapeta, Neraniki Thanda, and Neraniki join the procession; they carry long sticks with metal ring tips and flaming torches to dance and perform feats.

At the same time, devotees from the rival villages of Yellarthi, Suluvoy, Aluru, Nitravatti, and Arikera prepare to divert the procession towards their villages as it is considered auspicious. Both groups of devotees clash, which often leads to injuries. The deities are taken to Padalakatta the next day where the temple head priest slits his thigh with a knife to offer the blood to Lord Mala Malleswara Swamy. The priest then addresses the gathered devotees and predicts the future of the villages as well as comments on the crops grown in the region.

The deities are taken to Simhasanakatta and the priest performs rituals to mark the end of that year’s Devaragutta Dasara festival.

People from nearby states such as Karnataka and Tamil Nadu travel to Devaragutta during the festival.
