= Chaupal, Himachal Pradesh =

Chopal
- Town
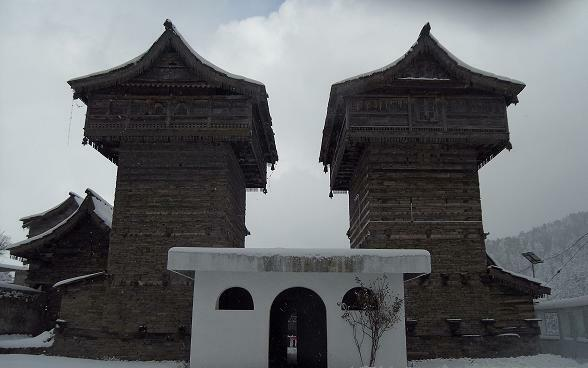
- Bijat Maharaj Temple in Sarain village, Chopal.

- Location in Himachal Pradesh, India Chopal (India)
- Coordinates: 30.95°N 77.58°E
- Country: India
- State: Himachal Pradesh
- District: Shimla

Government
  - BJP: Balbir Singh Verma

Area
  - Total: 8 km^{2} (3.1 sq mi)
- Elevation: 2,550 m (8,370 ft)

Population (2011)
  - Total: 7,886
  - Density: 990/km^{2} (2,600/sq mi)

Languages
  - Official: Hindi
  - Regional: Mahasu Pahari (Bishashau)
- Time zone: UTC+5:30 (IST)
- PIN: 171211
- Telephone code: 01783
- Vehicle registration: HP- 08, 08A, 08B, 08C

Chopal (also spelled Chaupal) is a town and Nagar Panchayat in Shimla district of Himachal Pradesh, India.

== Geography ==
Chopal is located in the southeastern part of Himachal Pradesh, at an elevation of approximately 2,550 metres above mean sea level. The town is situated amid orchards, agricultural fields and forests, with the surrounding landscape characterised by steep, terraced terrain. The town is surrounded by Shantha and Tharoch to the north, Kharu to the south, Nauran to the east and Jungle Dhania to the west. The wider region is connected with Jubbal and Kotkhai, Sirmaur, Nerwa and Theog. Churdhar Peak lies to the southwest of the town and forms a prominent feature of the surrounding landscape.

== History ==
The precise origin of Chopal is uncertain. Local accounts recorded in historical surveys state that several Thakur families lived in the area several centuries ago and that the territory later became associated with the erstwhile Jubbal State. Chopal is described as having served as a summer seat of the ruler of Jubbal State. A fort formerly stood at the site, but it was later destroyed by fire during the period of Wazir Sher Singh. A temple dedicated to the Shirgul deity was subsequently established at the site. The name Chopal has been traditionally associated with the Hindi word chopal, referring to a meeting place or a relatively level area. The upper part of the settlement has a comparatively flat appearance, which is given as one possible explanation for the name. Before the formation of Himachal Pradesh, the Chopal valley formed part of the erstwhile Jubbal State. Chopal subsequently became the headquarters of Chopal tehsil. Until 1962, it was not connected by a motorable road beyond Deha, despite being an important administrative centre.

== Demographics ==
According to the 2011 Census of India, Chopal Nagar Panchayat had a population of 1,851, comprising 1,032 males and 819 females. The Nagar Panchayat covered approximately 4 km² and contained 577 households.

The wider Chopal Planning Area had a population of 3,076 in the 2011 Census, while Chopal tehsil had a population of 31,118.

== Economy ==
Horticulture and agriculture are important economic activities in the Chopal region. Apple cultivation is an important part of the economy of the Chopal region. The Nagar Panchayat Chopal identifies Bamta, Tharoch, Poran, Pauria, Peontra Valley, Rinjat, Khaddar, Matal, Chanju, Kashah, Rushlah, Sarain and several other areas as apple-growing belts.

Other temperate fruits cultivated in the region include pear, plum, kiwi, persimmon, cherry, apricot and peach. Peak.

== Tourism ==
Chopal and its surrounding region are known for forested mountain landscapes, religious sites and trekking routes.

Churdhar is one of the principal trekking destinations associated with the Chopal region. The Himachal Pradesh Ecotourism Society identifies Sarain as one of the starting points for the trek to Churdhar. The summit is associated with temples dedicated to Chooreshwar Mahadev and Shirgul Maharaj. Sarain is located about 13 km from Chopal and is surrounded by forests of pine, deodar and fir. The Sarain Forest Rest House dates from 1914 and serves as one of the access points for the Churdhar trek.

The Churdhar Wildlife Sanctuary lies in the wider Chopal forest region. Government forest records state that the portion of the sanctuary in Shimla district was formerly managed by the Chopal Forest Division before the sanctuary was declared in 1985.

== Forests ==
Forests form an important component of the Chopal landscape and economy. The Chopal Forest Division is one of the forest divisions administered by the Himachal Pradesh Forest Department. The forests around Churdhar include fir, spruce and oak, among other species.

== Climate ==
Chopal has a cool and moderate climate. Between December and March, the town gets heavy snow and the temperature can hover around freezing point. During the summer, the climate is warmer with temperatures around thirty degrees Celsius.

- Temp in Winter:−10 °C (14 °F) to 18 °C (64 °F)
- Temp in Summer:20 °C (68 °F) to 32 °C (90 °F)

Chopal

Climate chart (precipitation, max. and min. temperature)
J	F	M	A	M	J	J	A	S	O	N	D
55 7 −10	47 9 −2	59 16 7	41 20 11	56 32 15	176 32 17	377 30 15	335 22 15	190 24 13	46 20 11	14 16 7	16 5 −5
- █ Average max. and min. temperatures in °C
- █ Precipitation totals in mm
Imperial conversion
J	F	M	A	M	J	J	A	S	O	N	D
2.1 45 14	1.9 48 28	2.3 60 44	1.6 69 52	2.2 90 59	6.9 90 62	15 86 59	13 72 59	7.5 75 56	1.8 67 51	0.5 61 45	0.6 41 23
- █ Average max. and min. temperatures in °F
- █ Precipitation totals in inches
