= Churdhar Sanctuary =

Wildlife sanctuary and holy place in Himachal Pradesh, India

Churdhar
- IUCN category IV (habitat/species management area)
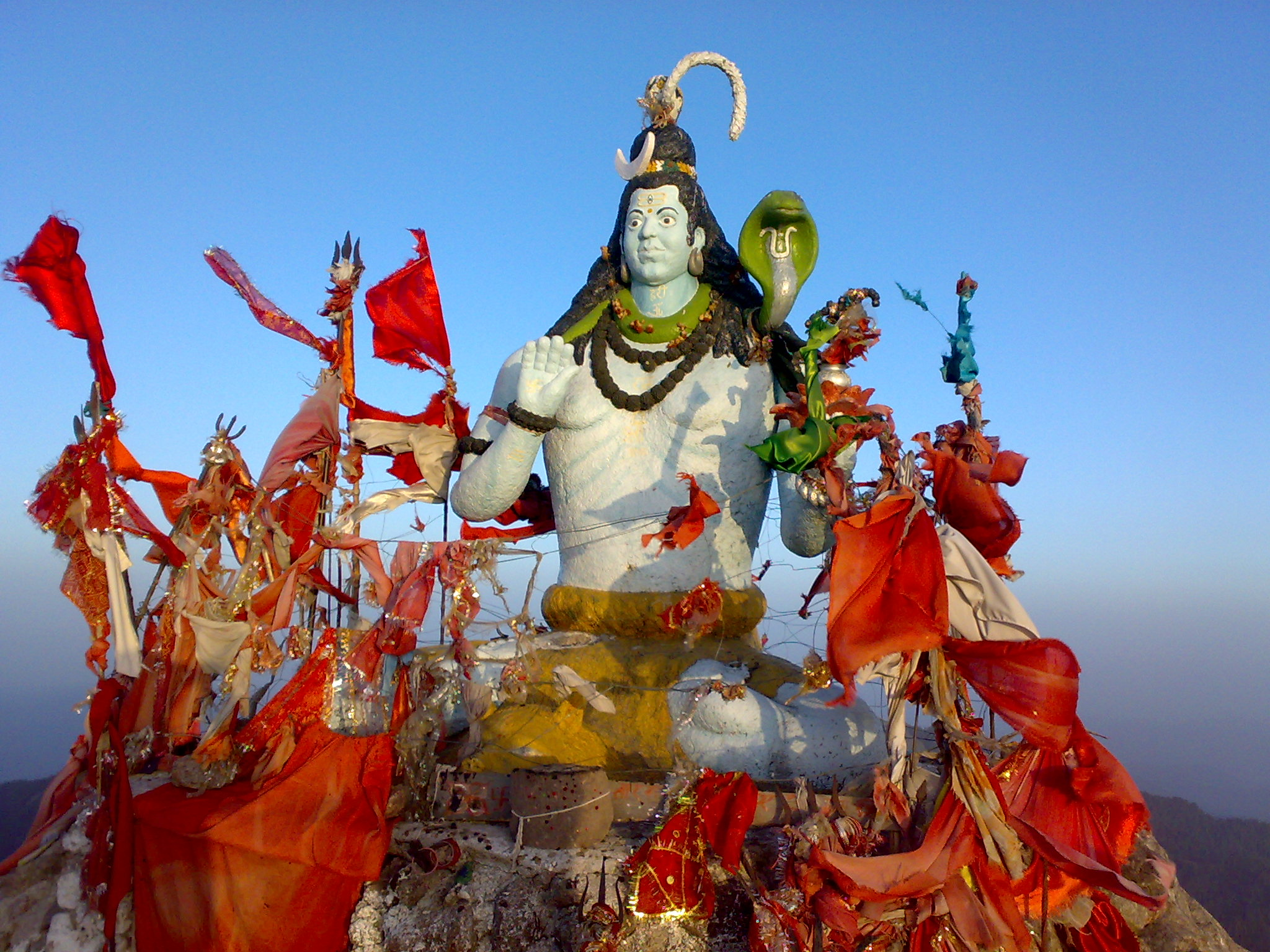
- Churdhar sculpture

- Location within Himachal Pradesh Location within India
- Interactive map of Churdhar
- Location: Shimla district, Himachal Pradesh, India
- Coordinates: 30.8763°N 77.4013°E
- Area: 56.16 km^{2} (21.68 sq mi)
- Established: 1985

Churdhar Sanctuary is a wildlife sanctuary in the Indian state of Himachal Pradesh. The sanctuary covers an area of 56.16 square kilometres and was notified on 15 November 1985. Its fauna includes the Himalayan black bear, barking deer, musk deer, gray langur, and Indian leopard. The sanctuary is administered by the Chureshwar Sewa Samiti.

The sanctuary is named after Churdhar Peak. Churdhar (elevation of 3,647 metres; 11,965 feet) is the highest peak in Sirmaur district and is also the highest peak in the outer Himalayas. The peak has a great religious significance for the people of Sirmour, Shimla, Chaupal and Solan of Himachal Pradesh and Dehradun of Uttarakhand. Churdhar is a holy place related to Shri Shirgul Maharaj (Chureshwar Maharaj), a deity widely worshipped in Sirmour and Chaupal. The main routes for arrival are from Nohradhar to 18 km, (Sirmour) and Sarain, Chaupal of 8 km.

The Churdhar Peak is mentioned in the book, The Great Arc, by John Keay but is referred to as The Chur. It is from this peak that George Everest made many astronomical readings and sightings of the Himalaya mountains around 1834. He was the Surveyor General of India and did the initial survey of the full length of India as well as some very accurate measurements of the earth's curvature.

== Access ==
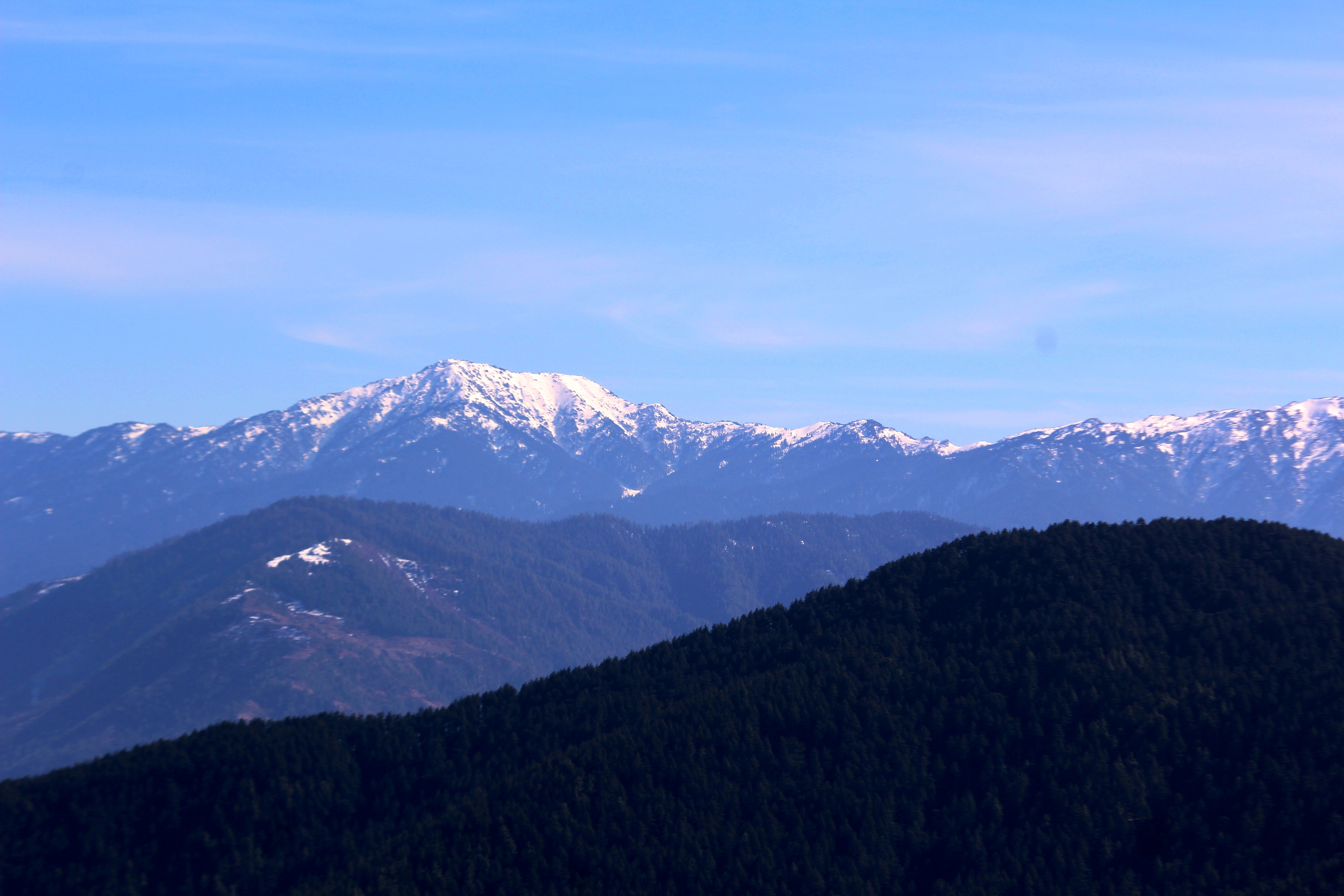
Snow-covered Churdhar peak in winter

- Airways: Jubbarhatti airport (23 km from Shimla)
- Nearest railhead: Shimla to Kalka narrow-gauge railway line
- Nearest city: Chaupal, Himachal Pradesh
- The sanctuary has a well connected road network.
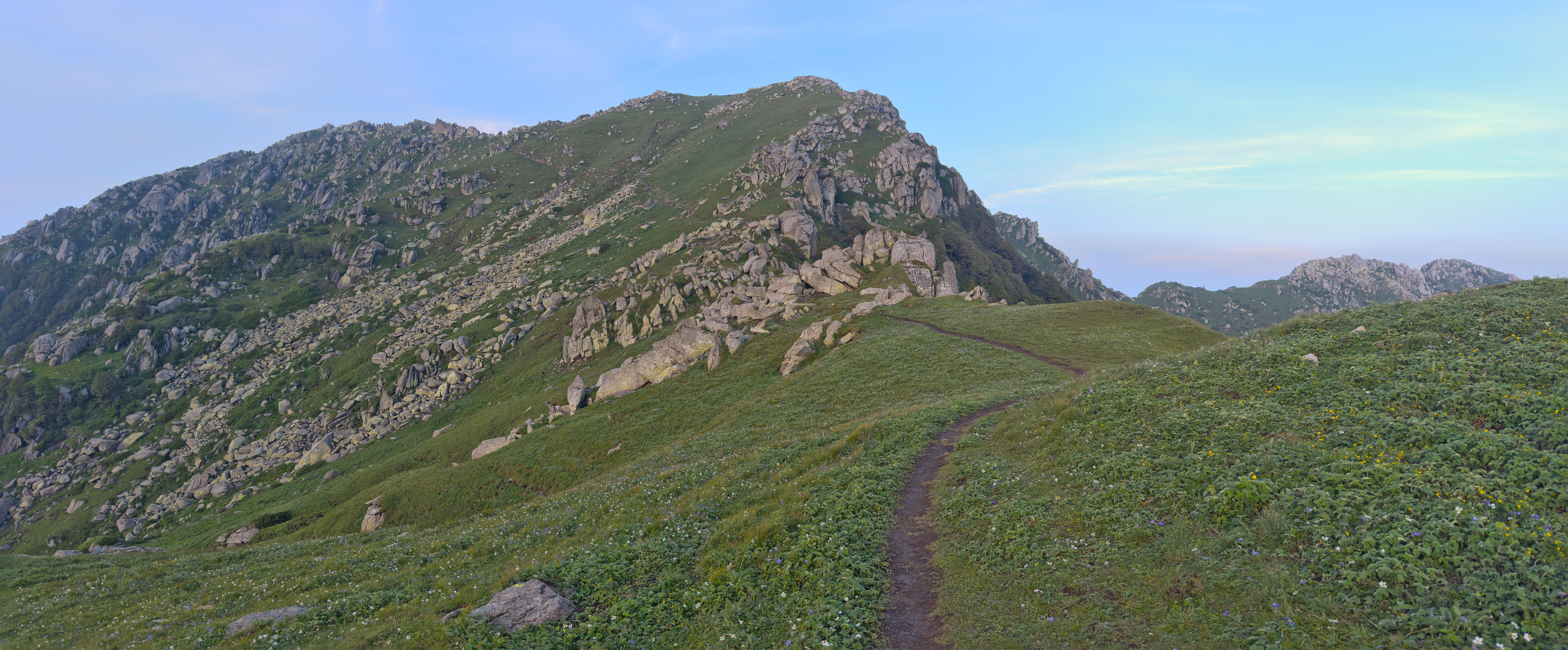
Panoramic view of trail to Churdhar Peak
