= Sirmaur district =

District in Himachal Pradesh, India

- District of Himachal Pradesh
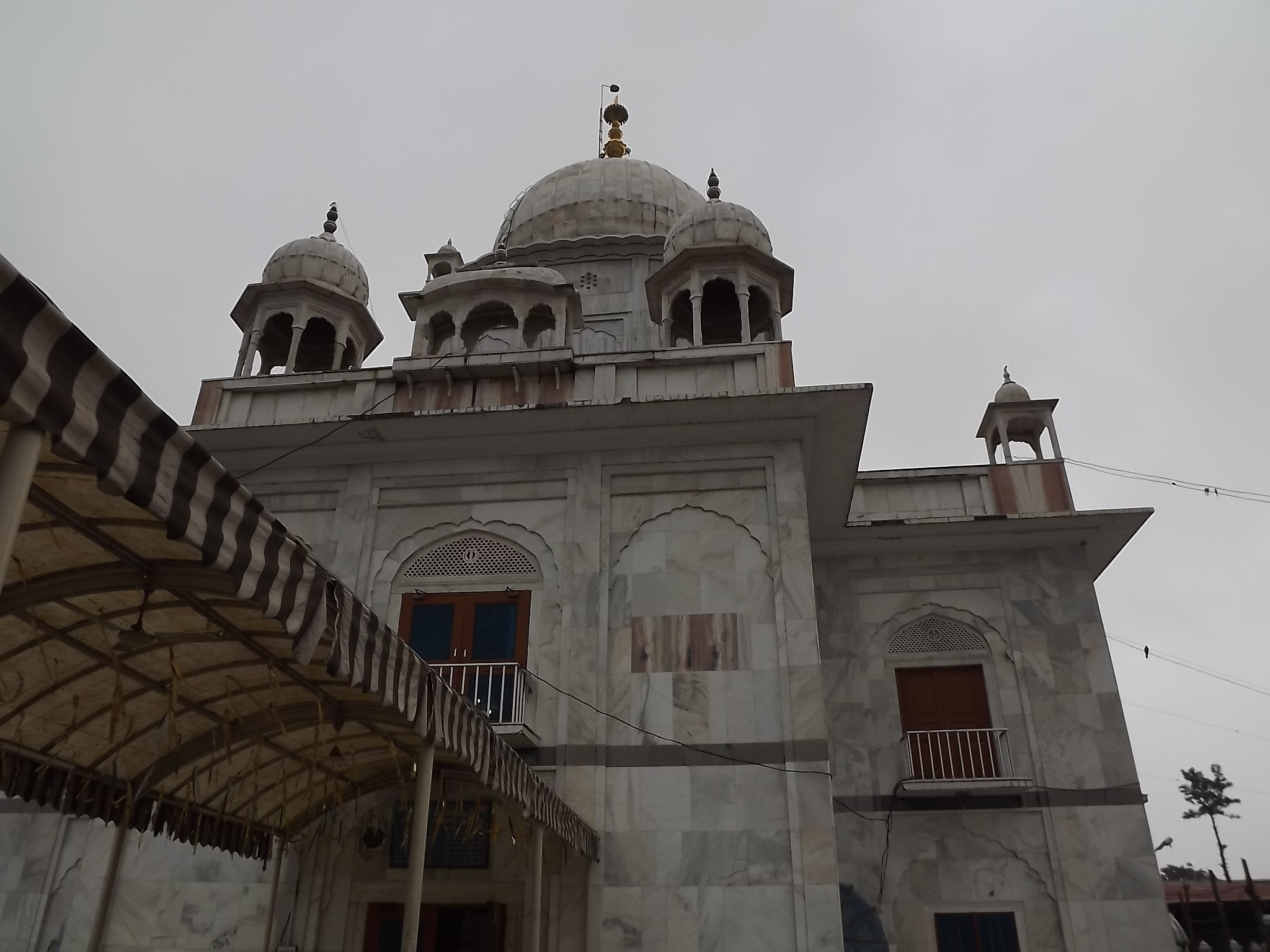
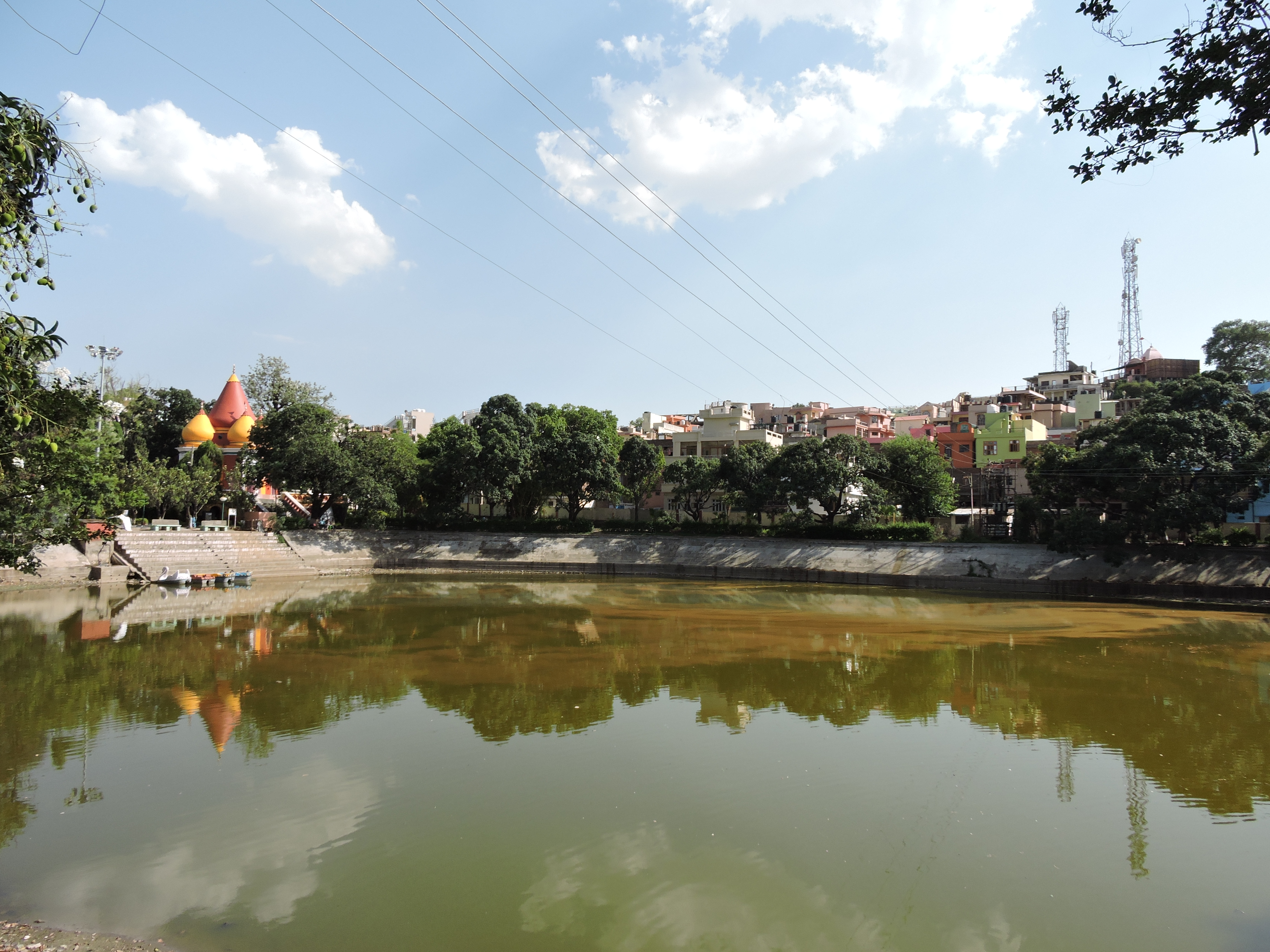
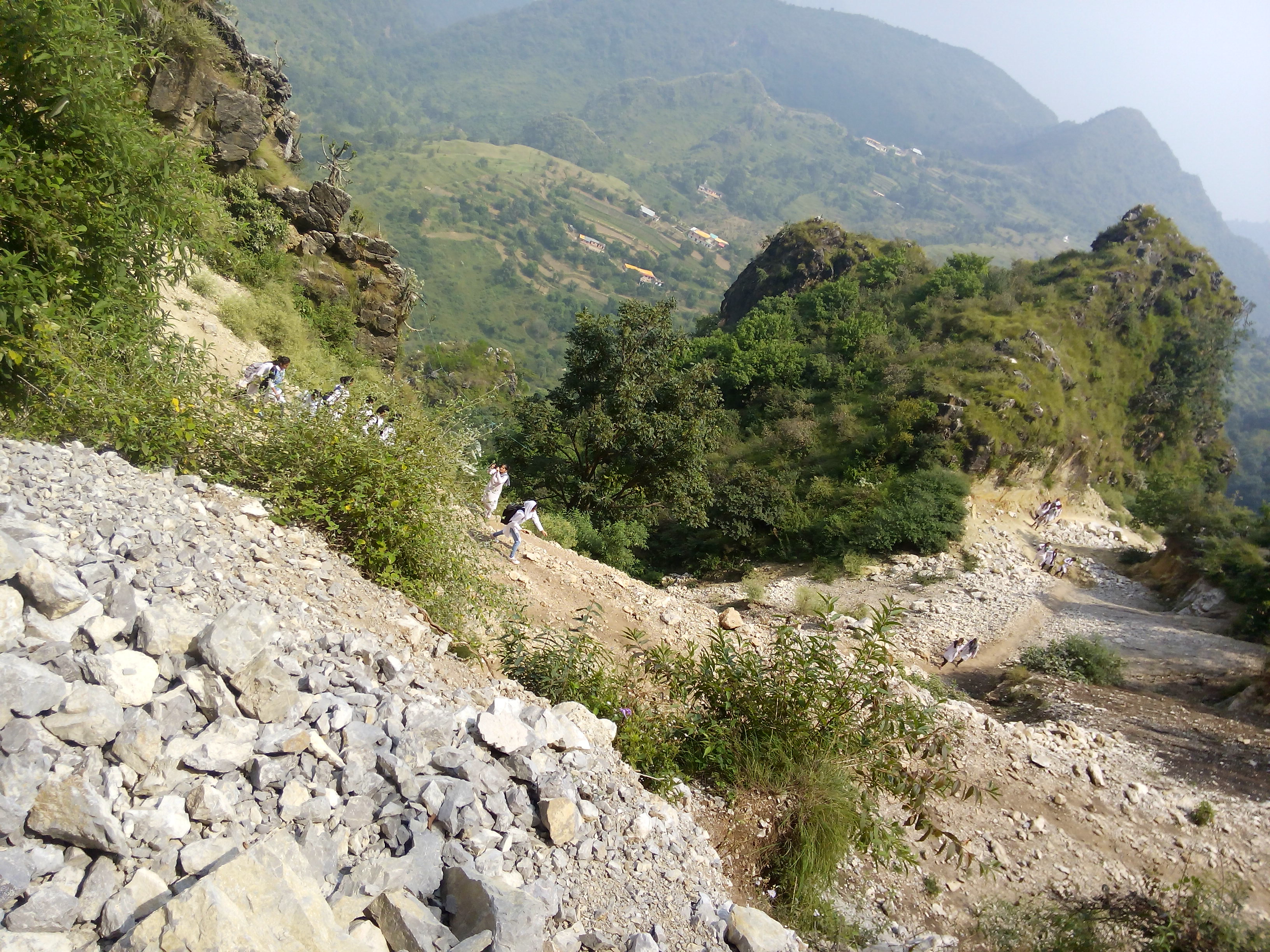
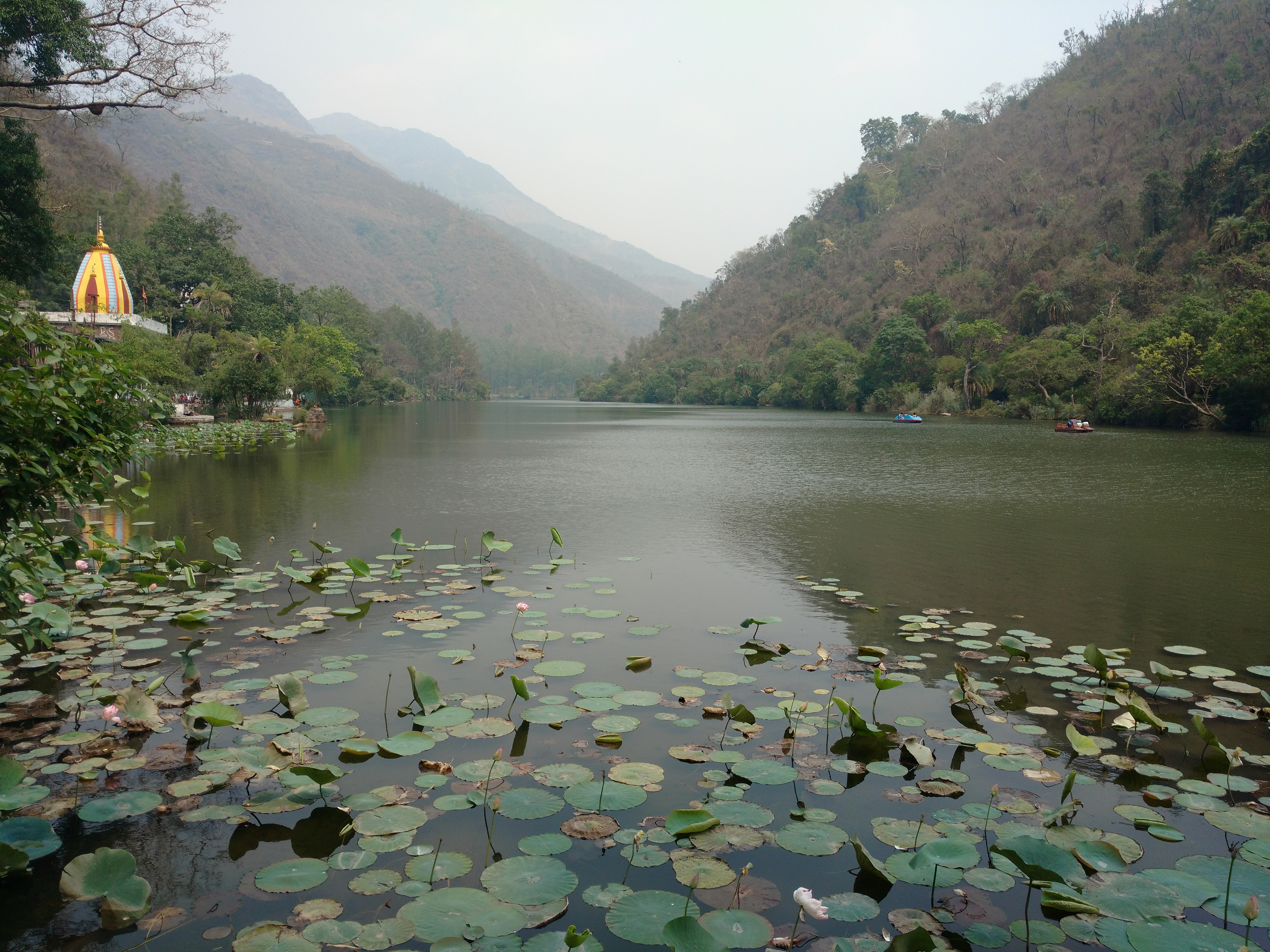
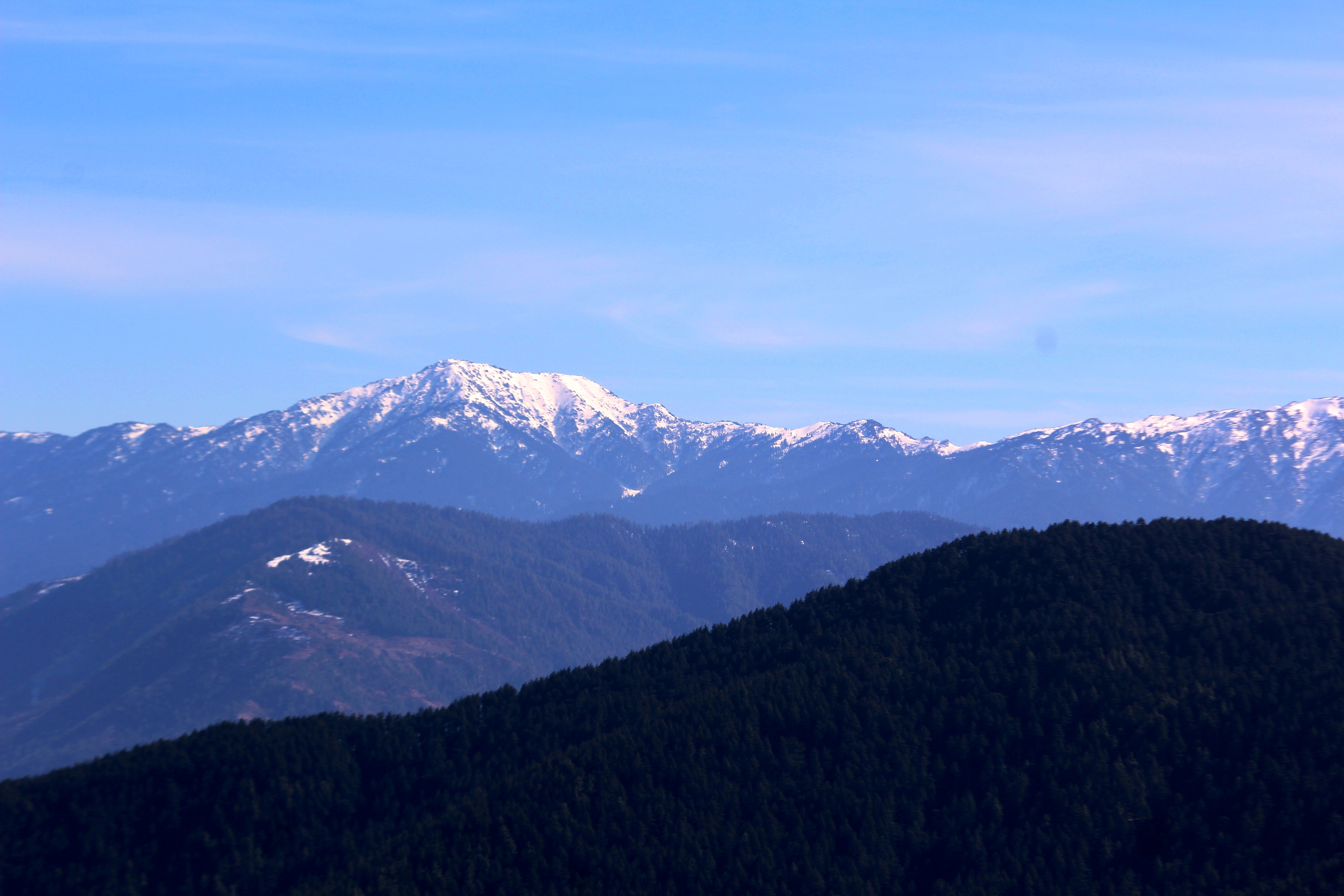
- Clockwise from top-left: Gurudwara Paonta Sahib, Rani Tal Shiva Temple, Nahan, Renuka Temple and Renuka Lake, Churdhar Sanctuary, Mangarh Shiva Temple

- Location in Himachal Pradesh
- Coordinates (Nahan): 30.64°N 77.44°E
- Country: India
- State: Himachal Pradesh
- Headquarters: Nahan
- Tehsils: 7

Government
  - Vidhan Sabha constituencies: 5

Area
  - Total: 2,825 km^{2} (1,091 sq mi)

Population (2011)
  - Total: 529,855
  - Density: 187.6/km^{2} (485.8/sq mi)

Demographics
  - Literacy: 79.98%
  - Sex ratio: 915

Languages
  - Official: Hindi
  - Regional: Sirmauri
- Time zone: UTC+05:30 (IST)
- Vehicle registration: HP-16, HP-16AA, HP-17, HP-18, HP-71, HP-79, HP-85
- Website: https://hpsirmaur.nic.in/

Sirmaur district is the southernmost district in the Himalayan state of Himachal Pradesh, India. It is largely mountainous and rural, with 90% of its population living in villages. The district capital is the town of Nahan. Some other towns include Paonta Sahib, Lana Palar, Tuheri, Bhawan, Sirmaur, Shamra, UchaTikker and Suketi - the last being known for Shivalik Fossil Park. Culturally, it is a part of the historical Mahasu region.

== Geography ==
There are seven tehsils in this district: Nahan, Renuka, Kamrau, Shillai, Rajgarh, Pachhad, and Paonta Sahib. The Giri River divides the district into two almost equal parts: Giripar and Giriaar. The major towns are Nahan, Paonta Sahib, Rajgarh, and Shillai. Rajgarh is the biggest village of Sirmour district.

== History ==
Historical population
Year	Pop.	±% p.a.
1901	135,667	—
1911	138,500	+0.21%
1921	140,428	+0.14%
1931	148,547	+0.56%
1941	156,003	+0.49%
1951	166,053	+0.63%
1961	197,488	+1.75%
1971	244,922	+2.18%
1981	306,897	+2.28%
1991	379,695	+2.15%
2001	458,593	+1.91%
2011	529,855	+1.45%

After the Independence of India, the Sirmur princely state was merged into India, and reconstituted as a district of the Himachal Pradesh state on April 15, 1948.

== Demographics ==
According to the 2011 Census of India, Sirmaur district has a population of 529,855, which placed it 542nd in India (out of a total of 640). The district had a population density of 188 inhabitants per square kilometre (490/sq mi). Its population growth rate over the decade 2001–2011 was 15.61%. Sirmaur had a sex ratio of 915 females for every 1000 males, and a literacy rate of 79.98%. 10.79% of the population lived in urban areas. Scheduled Castes and Scheduled Tribes made up 30.34% and 2.13% of the population respectively.

Religions in Sirmaur district (2011)
Religion	Percent
Hinduism	90.00%
Islam	6.27%
Sikhism	2.93%
Buddhism	0.50%
Other or not stated	0.30%

=== Language ===
Languages of Sirmaur district (2011)
1. Hindi (39.3%)
2. Pahari (33.5%)
3. Sirmauri (19.9%)
4. Punjabi (3.88%)
5. Nepali (0.94%)
6. Others (2.45%)

As of the 2011 census, 39% of the population of the district identified their first language as Hindi, 34% as Pahari, and 20% as Sirmauri. There were also speakers of Punjabi (3.88%), Nepali (0.94%), Haryanvi, (0.43%), and Tibetan (0.42%).

== Simbalbara National Park ==
Declared a national park in 2010, Simbalbara National Park is located in Sirmaur district. It covers an area of around 27.88 sq.km. The fauna of Simbalbara National Park includes, Goral, Spotted Deer, Sambhar, Himalayan Black Bear, Hanuman Langurs and Indian Muntjacs. The flora includes Sal forests and lush green pastures.

== Politics ==
District	Constituency	Name	Party	Remarks
Sirmaur	Pachhad (SC)	Reena Kashyap	Bharatiya Janata Party	
Sirmaur	Nahan	Ajay Solanki	Indian National Congress	
Sirmaur	Sri Renukaji (SC)	Vinay Kumar	Indian National Congress	Ex Deputy Speaker
Sirmaur	Paonta Sahib	Sukh Ram Chaudhary	Bharatiya Janata Party	
Sirmaur	Shillai	Harshwardhan Chauhan	Indian National Congress	Cabinet Minister

== Notable people ==
- Yashwant Singh Parmar
- Mohit Chauhan
- Siddharth Chauhan
- The Great Khali
- Jagat Ram
- Vidyanand Sarek

== See also ==
- Gurudwara Paonta Sahib
- Battle of Bhangani
