= List of leaders of the opposition in the Himachal Pradesh Legislative Assembly =

Politician who leads principal opposition party

Leader of the Opposition of the Himachal Pradesh Legislative Assembly
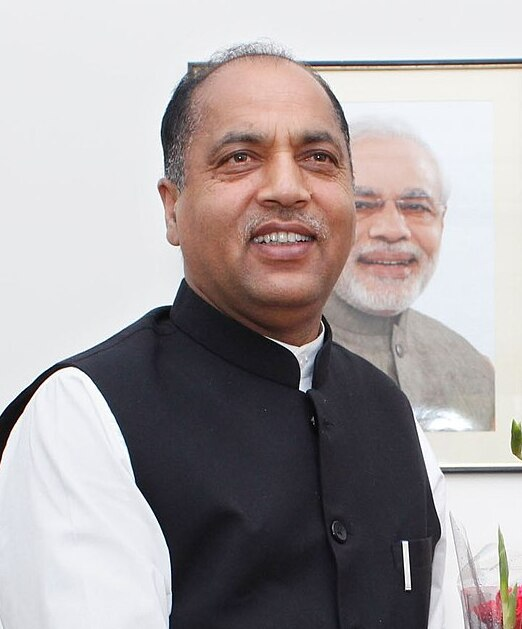
- Incumbent; Jai Ram Thakur since 25 December 2022
- Style: The Hon’ble
- Member of: Himachal Pradesh Legislative Assembly
- Nominator: Members of the Official Opposition of the Legislative Assembly
- Appointer: Speaker of the Assembly
- Term length: 5 years Till the Assembly Continues
- Inaugural holder: Dinanath; 1963-67

The leader of the opposition in the Himachal Pradesh Legislative Assembly is the politician who leads the official opposition in the Himachal Pradesh Legislative Assembly.

== Eligibility ==
Official Opposition is a term used in Himachal Pradesh Legislative Assembly to designate the political party which has secured the second largest number of seats in the assembly. In order to get formal recognition, the party must have at least 10% of total membership of the Legislative Assembly as an individual party, and not as a coalition.

== Role ==
In legislature, opposition party has a major role and must act to discourage the party in power from acting against the interests of the country and the electorate. They are expected to alert the population and the Government on the content of any bill, which is not in the best interests of the country.

== List of leaders of the opposition ==
No	Portrait	Name	Constituency	Tenure			Assembly	Chief Minister	Party
1		Dina Nath		1 July 1963	11 January 1967	3 years, 194 days	1st	Yashwant Singh Parmar	Swatantra Party
2		Kanwar Durga Chand	Sullah	18 March 1967	1 March 1972	4 years, 349 days	2nd	Yashwant Singh Parmar	Bharatiya Jana Sangh
3		Shanta Kumar	Khera	27 March 1972	30 March 1977	5 years, 3 days	3rd	Yashwant Singh Parmar; Thakur Ram Lal	Bharatiya Jana Sangh
4		Thakur Ram Lal	Jubbal-Kotkhai	29 June 1977	13 February 1980	2 years, 229 days	4th	Shanta Kumar	Indian National Congress
5		Jagdev Chand	Hamirpur	11 March 1985	3 March 1990	4 years, 357 days	6th	Virbhadra Singh	Bharatiya Janata Party
6		Vidya Stokes	Theog	21 March 1990	15 December 1992	2 years, 269 days	7th	Shanta Kumar	Indian National Congress
7		Jagat Prakash Nadda	Bilaspur	1 December 1993	24 December 1997	4 years, 23 days	8th	Virbhadra Singh	Bharatiya Janata Party
8		Virbhadra Singh	Rohru	25 March 1998	4 March 2003	4 years, 344 days	9th	Prem Kumar Dhumal	Indian National Congress
9		Prem Kumar Dhumal	Bamsan				10th	Virbhadra Singh	Bharatiya Janata Party
(6)		Vidya Stokes	Kumarsain	22 January 2008	25 December 2012	4 years, 338 days	11th	Prem Kumar Dhumal	Indian National Congress
(9)		Prem Kumar Dhumal	Hamirpur	2 January 2013	18 December 2017	4 years, 350 days	12th	Virbhadra Singh	Bharatiya Janata Party
10		Mukesh Agnihotri	Haroli	5 January 2018	11 December 2022	4 years, 340 days	13th	Jai Ram Thakur	Indian National Congress
11		Jai Ram Thakur	Seraj	25 December 2022	Incumbent	3 years, 283 days	14th	Sukhvinder Singh Sukhu	Bharatiya Janata Party

== See also ==
- Government of Himachal Pradesh
- Governor of Himachal Pradesh
- Chief Minister of Himachal Pradesh
- Himachal Pradesh Legislative Assembly
- Himachal Pradesh Council of Ministers
- List of current Indian opposition leaders
