= 13th Himachal Pradesh Assembly =

13th Legislative Assembly
- Himachal Pradesh Legislative Assembly

Type
- Type: Unicameral
- Term limits: 5 years

History
- Preceded by: 12th Legislative Assembly
- Succeeded by: 14th Legislative Assembly

Leadership
- Speaker: Vipin Singh Parmar, BJP since 26 February 2020
- Deputy Speaker: Hans Raj , BJP since 10 January 2018
- Leader of the House (Chief Minister): Jai Ram Thakur, BJP since 27 December 2017
- Leader of the Opposition: Mukesh Agnihotri, INC since 5 January 2018

Structure
- Seats: 68
- Political groups: Government (43): BJP (43); Opposition (23): INC (22); CPI (M) (1); Independent (2): IND (2)

Elections
- Voting system: First past the post
- Last election: 9 November 2017
- Next election: 12 November 2022

Meeting place
- Himachal Pradesh Legislative Assembly, Shimla, Himachal Pradesh, India

Website
- Himachal Pradesh Legislative Assembly

The 13th Legislative Assembly of Himachal Pradesh was formed following the 2017 Assembly election for all 68 seats in the unicameral legislature. The term of 13th Assembly expired in December 2022, and the 2022 Himachal Pradesh Legislative Assembly election was conducted to form the 14th Himachal Pradesh Assembly.

== Office bearers ==
| Office | Holder |
Constitutional Posts
| Governor | Rajendra Vishwanath Arlekar |
| Speaker | Vipin Singh Parmar |
| Deputy speaker | Hans Raj |
| Leader of the House (Chief Minister) | Jai Ram Thakur |
Political posts
| Leader of Ruling party | Jai Ram Thakur |
| Leader of Opposition (Leader of Opposition legislature party) | Mukesh Agnihotri |

== Members of the Assembly (2017-2022) ==
| No. | Constituency | Member | Party | Remarks | Reference |
|---|---|---|---|---|---|
Chamba district
| 1 | Churah (SC) | Hans Raj | Bharatiya Janata Party | Deputy Speaker (11.01.2018–current) | |
| 2 | Bharmour (ST) | Jia Lal | Bharatiya Janata Party | | |
| 3 | Chamba | Pawan Nayyar | Bharatiya Janata Party | | |
| 4 | Dalhousie | Asha Kumari | Indian National Congress | Chairman, Public Accounts Committee | |
| 5 | Bhattiyat | Bikram Singh Jaryal | Bharatiya Janata Party | Chairman, Rural Planning Committee | |
Kangra district
| 6 | Nurpur | Rakesh Pathania | Bharatiya Janata Party | Forest Minister | |
| 7 | Indora (SC) | Reeta Devi | Bhartiya Janata Party | | |
| 8 | Fatehpur | Sujan Singh Pathania^{‡} | Indian National Congress | Member until February 2021 | |
| 8 | Fatehpur | Bhawani Singh Pathania | Indian National Congress | Member from 30.10.2021 | |
| 9 | Jawali | Arjun Singh | Bharatiya Janata Party | | |
| 10 | Dehra | Hoshyar Singh | Bharatiya Janata Party | Defected From Independent To BJP | |
| 11 | Jaswan-Pragpur | Bikram Singh | Bharatiya Janata Party | Industries Minister | |
| 12 | Jawalamukhi | Ramesh Chand Dhawala | Bhartiya Janata Party | Chairman, Estimates Committee | |
| 13 | Jaisinghpur (SC) | Ravinder Kumar | Bhartiya Janata Party | | |
| 14 | Sullah | Vipin Singh Parmar | Bhartiya Janata Party | Speaker | |
| 15 | Nagrota | Arun Kumar | Bharatiya Janata Party | | |
| 16 | Kangra | Pawan Kumar Kajal | Indian National Congress | Defected From INC To BJP in August 2022 | |
| 16 | Kangra | Pawan Kumar Kajal | Bharatiya Janata Party | Defected From INC To BJP in August 2022 | |
| 17 | Shahpur | Sarveen Choudhary | Bhartiya Janata Party | Social Justice & Empowerment Minister | |
| 18 | Dharamshala | Kishan Kapoor | Bhartiya Janata Party | Member Until May 2019 | |
| 18 | Dharamshala | Vishal Nehria | Bhartiya Janata Party | | |
| 19 | Palampur | Ashish Butail | Indian National Congress | | |
| 20 | Baijnath (SC) | Mulkh Raj Premi | Bharatiya Janata Party | | |
Lahaul and Spiti district
| 21 | Lahaul and Spiti (ST) | Ram Lal Markanda | Bharatiya Janata Party | Technical Education Minister | |
Kullu district
| 22 | Manali | Govind Singh Thakur | Bhartiya Janata Party | Education Minister | |
| 23 | Kullu | Sunder Singh Thakur | Indian National Congress | | |
| 24 | Banjar | Surender Shourie | Bhartiya Janata Party | | |
| 25 | Anni (SC) | Kishori Lal | Bhartiya Janata Party | | |
Mandi district
| 26 | Karsog (SC) | Hira Lal | Bhartiya Janata Party | | |
| 27 | Sundernagar | Rakesh Jamwal | Bhartiya Janata Party | | |
| 28 | Nachan (SC) | Vinod Kumar | Bharatiya Janata Party | | |
| 29 | Seraj | Jai Ram Thakur | Bharatiya Janata Party | Chief Minister | |
| 30 | Darang | Jawahar Thakur | Bharatiya Janata Party | | |
| 31 | Jogindernagar | Prakash Rana | Bharatiya Janata Party | Defected From Independent To BJP | |
| 32 | Dharampur | Mahender Singh | Bharatiya Janata Party | Jal Shakti Minister | |
| 33 | Mandi | Anil Sharma | Bharatiya Janata Party | MPP and Power Minister (27.12.2017–13.04.2019) | |
| 34 | Balh (SC) | Inder Singh | Bharatiya Janata Party | | |
| 35 | Sarkaghat | Inder Singh | Bharatiya Janata Party | Chairman, Subordinate Legislation Committee | |
Hamirpur district
| 36 | Bhoranj (SC) | Kamlesh Kumari | Bharatiya Janata Party | | |
| 37 | Sujanpur | Rajinder Rana | Indian National Congress | | |
| 38 | Hamirpur | Narinder Thakur | Bhartiya Janata Party | | |
| 39 | Barsar | Inder Dutt Lakhanpal | Indian National Congress | | |
| 40 | Nadaun | Sukhvinder Singh Sukhu | Indian National Congress | | |
Una district
| 41 | Chintpurni (SC) | Balbir Singh | Bhartiya Janata Party | Chairman, Human Development Committee | |
| 42 | Gagret | Rajesh Thakur | Bhartiya Janata Party | | |
| 43 | Haroli | Mukesh Agnihotri | Indian National Congress | Leader Of Opposition | |
| 44 | Una | Satpal Raizada | Indian National Congress | | |
| 45 | Kutlehar | Virender Kanwar | Bhartiya Janata Party | Rural Development & Panchayati Raj Minister | |
Bilaspur district
| 46 | Jhanduta (SC) | Jeet Ram Katwal | Bharatiya Janata Party | | |
| 47 | Ghumarwin | Rajinder Garg | Bhartiya Janata Party | Food, Civil Supplies and Consumer Affairs Minister | |
| 48 | Bilaspur | Subhash Thakur | Bharatiya Janata Party | | |
| 49 | Sri Naina Deviji | Ram Lal Thakur | Indian National Congress | | |
Solan district
| 50 | Arki | Virbhadra Singh^{‡} | Indian National Congress | Member until July 2021 | |
| 50 | Arki | Sanjay Awasthy | Indian National Congress | | |
| 51 | Nalagarh | Lakhwinder Singh Rana | Indian National Congress | Defected From INC To BJP In August 2022 | |
| 51 | Nalagarh | Lakhwinder Singh Rana | Bharatiya Janata Party | Defected From INC To BJP In August 2022 | |
| 52 | Doon | Paramjeet Singh Pammi | Bhartiya Janata Party | | |
| 53 | Solan (SC) | Dhani Ram Shandil | Indian National Congress | | |
| 54 | Kasauli (SC) | Dr. Rajiv Saizal | Bhartiya Janata Party | Health and Family Welfare Minister | |
Sirmaur district
| 55 | Pachhad (SC) | Suresh Kumar Kashyap | Bhartiya Janata Party | Member until May 2019 | |
| 55 | Pachhad (SC) | Reena Kashyap | Bhartiya Janata Party | | |
| 56 | Nahan | Dr. Rajeev Bindal | Bhartiya Janata Party | | |
| 57 | Sri Renukaji (SC) | Vinay Kumar | Indian National Congress | | |
| 58 | Paonta Sahib | Sukh Ram Chaudhary | Bhartiya Janata Party | MPP and Power Minister | |
| 59 | Shillai | Harshwardhan Chauhan | Indian National Congress | | |
Shimla district
| 60 | Chopal | Balbir Singh Verma | Bhartiya Janata Party | | |
| 61 | Theog | Rakesh Singha | Communist Party of India (Marxist) | | |
| 62 | Kasumpati | Anirudh Singh | Indian National Congress | | |
| 63 | Shimla | Suresh Bhardwaj | Bhartiya Janata Party | Urban Development Minister | |
| 64 | Shimla Rural | Vikramaditya Singh | Indian National Congress | | |
| 65 | Jubbal-Kotkhai | Narinder Bragta^{‡} | Bhartiya Janata Party | Member until June 2021 | |
| 65 | Jubbal-Kotkhai | Rohit Thakur | Indian National Congress | Member from 30.10.2021 | |
| 66 | Rampur (SC) | Nand Lal | Indian National Congress | | |
| 67 | Rohru (SC) | Mohan Lal Brakta | Indian National Congress | | |
Kinnaur district
| 68 | Kinnaur (ST) | Jagat Singh Negi | Indian National Congress | | |

^{‡} Indicates sitting member who died in office.
