= 12th Himachal Pradesh Assembly =

Representative cohort in Pradesh, India

12th Legislative Assembly
- Himachal Pradesh Legislative Assembly

Type
- Type: Unicameral
- Term limits: 5 years

History
- Preceded by: 11th Legislative Assembly
- Succeeded by: 13th Legislative Assembly

Leadership
- Speaker: Brij Behari Lal Butail, INC since 9 January 2013
- Deputy Speaker: Jagat Singh Negi, INC since 12 March 2013
- Leader of the House (Chief Minister): Virbhadra Singh, INC since 25 December 2012
- Leader of the Opposition: Prem Kumar Dhumal, BJP since 2 January 2013

Structure
- Seats: 68
- Political groups: Government (42): INC (36); IND (6); Opposition (26): BJP (26)

Elections
- Voting system: First past the post
- Last election: December 2007
- Next election: 9 November 2017

Meeting place
- Himachal Pradesh Legislative Assembly, Shimla, Himachal Pradesh, India

In the election for the Twelfth Legislative Assembly of Himachal Pradesh, held 4 November 2012, the Congress Party secured a victory. The Congress won 36, while the Bharatiya Janata Party won 26 of the 68 seats.

== Members of the Assembly (2012-2017) ==
S. No.	Constituency	Member	Party
Chamba District
1	Churah (SC)	Hans Raj	BJP
2	Bharmour (ST)	Thakur Singh Bharmouri	INC
3	Chamba	B.K. Chauhan	BJP
4	Dalhousie	Asha Kumari	INC
5	Bhattiyat	Bikram Singh Jaryal	BJP
Kangra District
6	Nurpur	Ajay Mahajan	INC
7	Indora (SC)	Manohar Dhiman	IND
8	Fatehpur	Sujan Singh Pathania	INC
9	Jawali	Neeraj Bharti	INC
10	Dehra	Ravinder Singh Ravi	BJP
11	Jaswan-Pragpur	Bikram Singh	BJP
12	Jawalamukhi	Sanjay Rattan	INC
13	Jaisinghpur (SC)	Yadvinder Goma	INC
14	Sullah	Jagjivan Paul	INC
15	Nagrota	G. S. Bali	INC
16	Kangra	Pawan Kumar Kajal	IND
17	Shahpur	Sarveen Choudhary	BJP
18	Dharamshala	Sudhir Sharma	INC
19	Palampur	Brij Behari Lal Butail	INC
20	Baijnath (SC)	Kishori Lal	INC
Lahaul and Spiti District
21	Lahaul and Spiti (ST)	Ravi Thakur	INC
Kullu District
22	Manali	Govind Singh Thakur	BJP
23	Kullu	Maheshwar Singh	HLP
24	Banjar	Karan Singh	INC
25	Anni (SC)	Khub Ran	INC
Mandi District
26	Karsog (SC)	Mansa Ram	INC
27	Sundernagar	Sohan Lal	INC
28	Nachan (SC)	Vinod Kumar	BJP
29	Seraj	Jai Ram Thakur	BJP
30	Darang	Kaul Singh	INC
31	Jogindernagar	Gulab Singh Thakur	BJP
32	Dharampur	Mahender Singh	BJP
33	Mandi	Anil Kumar	INC
34	Balh (SC)	Prakash Chaudhary	INC
35	Sarkaghat	Colonel Inder Singh	BJP
Hamirpur District
36	Bhoranj (SC)	Ishwar Dass Dhiman	BJP
37	Sujanpur	Rajinder Singh	IND
38	Hamirpur	Prem Kumar Dhumal	BJP
39	Barsar	Inder Dutt Lakhanpal	INC
40	Nadaun	Vijay Agnihotri	BJP
Una District
41	Chintpurni (SC)	Kuldip Kumar	INC
42	Gagret	Rakesh Kalia	INC
43	Haroli	Mukesh Agnihotri	INC
44	Una	Satpal Singh Satti	BJP
45	Kutlehar	Virender Kanwar	BJP
Bilaspur District
46	Jhanduta (SC)	Rikhi Ram Kondal	BJP
47	Ghumarwin	Rajesh Dharmani	INC
48	Bilaspur	Bumber Thakur	INC
49	Sri Naina Deviji	Randhir Sharma	BJP
Solan District
50	Arki	Govind Ram Sharma	BJP
51	Nalagarh	Krishan Lal Thakur	BJP
52	Doon	Ram Kumar	INC
53	Solan (SC)	Col. (Retd.) Dhani Ram Shandil	INC
54	Kasauli (SC)	Rajiv Saizal	BJP
Sirmaur District
55	Pachhad (SC)	Suresh Kumar Kashyap	BJP
56	Nahan	Dr. Rajeev Bindal	BJP
57	Sri Renukaji (SC)	Vinay Kumar	INC
58	Paonta Sahib	Kirnesh Jung	IND
59	Shillai	Baldev Singh Tomar	BJP
Shimla District
60	Chopal	Balbir Singh Verma	IND
61	Theog	Vidya Stokes	INC
62	Kasumpati	Anirudh Singh	INC
63	Shimla	Suresh Bhardwaj	BJP
64	Shimla Rural	Virbhadra Singh	INC
65	Jubbal-Kotkhai	Rohit Thakur	INC
66	Rampur (SC)	Nand Lal	INC
67	Rohru (SC)	Mohan Lal Brakta	INC
Kinnaur District
68	Kinnaur (ST)	Jagat Singh Negi	INC

== See also ==
- Government of Himachal Pradesh
- Eighth Assembly
- Ninth Assembly
- Tenth Assembly
- Eleventh Assembly
