= 9th Himachal Pradesh Assembly =

9th Legislative Assembly
- Himachal Pradesh Legislative Assembly

Type
- Type: Unicameral
- Term limits: 5 years

History
- Preceded by: 8th Legislative Assembly
- Succeeded by: 10th Legislative Assembly

Leadership
- Speaker: Gulab Singh Thakur, BJP since 30 March 1998
- Deputy Speaker: Ram Dass Malanger, BJP since 20 August 1999
- Leader of the House (Chief Minister): Prem Kumar Dhumal, BJP since 24 March 1998
- Leader of the Opposition: Virbhadra Singh, INC since 25 March 1998

Structure
- Seats: 68
- Political groups: Government (37): BJP (31); HVC (5); IND (1); Opposition (31): INC (31)

Elections
- Voting system: First past the post
- Last election: 11 September 1993
- Next election: December 2002

Meeting place
- Himachal Pradesh Legislative Assembly, Shimla, Himachal Pradesh, India

The Himachal Pradesh Legislative Assembly or the Himachal Pradesh Vidhan Sabha is the unicameral legislature of the Indian state of Himachal Pradesh. The present strength of the Vidhan Sabha is 68. The members of the Tenth Legislative Assembly were elected in the 1998 Himachal Pradesh Legislative Assembly election.

== Members of the Assembly ==
The following assembly members were in the Ninth Legislative Assembly of Himachal Pradesh:

Constituency	Reserved for (SC/ST/None)	Member	Party
Kinnaur	ST	Chet Ram Negi	Bharatiya Janata Party
Rampur	SC	Singhi Ram	Indian National Congress
Rohru	None	Virbhadra Singh	Indian National Congress
Jubbal-kotkhai	None	Ram Lal	Indian National Congress
Chopal	None	Yogendra Chandar	Indian National Congress
Kumarsain	None	Jai Bihari Lal Khachi	Indian National Congress
Theog	None	Vidya Stokes	Indian National Congress
Simla	None	Narinder Bragta	Bharatiya Janata Party
Kasumpti	SC	Roop Dass Kashyap	Bharatiya Janata Party
Arki	None	Dharam Pal Thakur	Indian National Congress
Doon	None	Lajja Ram	Indian National Congress
Nalagarh	None	Hari Narayan Singh	Bharatiya Janata Party
Kasauli	SC	Raghu Raj	Indian National Congress
Solan	None	Krishna Mohini	Indian National Congress
Pachhad	SC	Gangu Ram Musafir	Indian National Congress
Rainka	SC	Prem Singh	Indian National Congress
Shillai	None	Harsh Wardhan	Indian National Congress
Paonta Doon	None	Rattan Singh	Indian National Congress
Nahan	None	Kush Parmar	Indian National Congress
Kotkehloor	None	Ram Lal Thakur	Indian National Congress
Bilaspur	None	Jagat Prakash Nadda	Bharatiya Janata Party
Ghumarwin	None	Kashmir Singh	Indian National Congress
Geharwin	SC	Rikhi Ram	Bharatiya Janata Party
Nadaun	None	Babu Ram Mandial	Bharatiya Janata Party
Hamirpur	None	Urmila Thakur	Bharatiya Janata Party
Bamsan	None	Prem Kumar Dhumal	Bharatiya Janata Party
Mewa	SC	Ishwar Dass Dhiman	Bharatiya Janata Party
Nadaunta	None	Baldev Sharma	Bharatiya Janata Party
Gagret	SC	Kuldeep Kumar	Indian National Congress
Chintpurni	None	Parveen Sharma	Bharatiya Janata Party
Santokgarh	None	Jai Krishan Sharma	Bharatiya Janata Party
Una	None	Virender Gautam	Indian National Congress
Kutlehar	None	Ram Dass Malangar	Bharatiya Janata Party
Nurpur	None	Rakesh Pathania	Bharatiya Janata Party
Gangath	SC	Des Raj	Bharatiya Janata Party
Jawali	None	Rajan Sushant	Bharatiya Janata Party
Guler	None	Chander Kumar	Indian National Congress
Jaswan	None	Viplove Thakur	Indian National Congress
Pragpur	SC	Virender Kumar	Bharatiya Janata Party
Jawalamukhi	None	Ramesh Chand	Independent
Thural	None	Ravinder Singh Ravi	Bharatiya Janata Party
Rajgir	SC	Atma Ram	Bharatiya Janata Party
Baijnath	None	Sant Ram	Indian National Congress
Palampur	None	Brij Behari Lal Butail	Indian National Congress
Sulah	None	Bipan Singh Parmar	Bharatiya Janata Party
Nagrota	None	G.s.bali	Indian National Congress
Shahpur	None	Sarveen Choudhary	Bharatiya Janata Party
Dharamsala	None	Kishan Chand Kapoor	Bharatiya Janata Party
Kangra	None	Vidya Sagar Chaudhary	Bharatiya Janata Party
Bhattiyat	None	Kishori Lal	Bharatiya Janata Party
Banikhet	None	Asha Kumari	Indian National Congress
Rajnagar	SC	Mohan Lal	Bharatiya Janata Party
Chamba	None	Harsh Mahajan	Indian National Congress
Bharmour	ST	Tulsi Ram	Bharatiya Janata Party
Lahaul And Spiti	ST	Ram Lal Markanda	Himachal Vikas Congress
Kulu	None	Chander Sain Thakur	Bharatiya Janata Party
Banjar	None	Karan Singh	Bharatiya Janata Party
Ani	SC	Ishwar Dass	Indian National Congress
Karsog	SC	Mansa Ram	Himachal Vikas Congress
Chachiot	None	Jai Ram Thakur	Bharatiya Janata Party
Nachan	SC	Tek Chand	Indian National Congress
Sundernagar	None	Roop Singh	Bharatiya Janata Party
Balh	SC	Parkash	Himachal Vikas Congress
Gopalpur	None	Rangila Ram Rao	Indian National Congress
Dharampur	None	Mahender Singh	Himachal Vikas Congress
Joginder Nagar	None	Gulab Singh	Indian National Congress
Darang	None	Kaul Sing	Indian National Congress
Mandi	None	Sukh Ram	Himachal Vikas Congress

Notes:

- Shri Sant Ram died on 30 June 1998. Shri Dulo Ram was elected from Baijnath in the following by-election.
- Krishna Mohini was removed from his post by a Supreme Court Judgment on 26 October 1999. Rajeev Bindal was elected from Solan in the following by-election.

== See also ==
- Government of Himachal Pradesh
