= 10th Himachal Pradesh Assembly =

10th Legislative Assembly
- Himachal Pradesh Legislative Assembly

Type
- Type: Unicameral
- Term limits: 5 years

History
- Preceded by: 9th Legislative Assembly
- Succeeded by: 11th Legislative Assembly

Leadership
- Speaker: G.R. Mussafir, INC since 10 March 2003
- Deputy Speaker: Dharam Pal Thakur, INC since 27 March 2003
- Leader of the House (Chief Minister): Virbhadra Singh, INC since 6 March 2003
- Leader of the Opposition: Prem Kumar Dhumal, BJP since 6 March 2003

Structure
- Seats: 68
- Political groups: Government (49): INC (43); IND (6); Opposition (19): BJP (16); LM(HP) (1); HVC (1); LJP (1)

Elections
- Voting system: First past the post
- Last election: 28 February and 3 June 1998
- Next election: December 2007

Meeting place
- Himachal Pradesh Legislative Assembly, Shimla, Himachal Pradesh, India

The Himachal Pradesh Legislative Assembly or the Himachal Pradesh Vidhan Sabha is the unicameral legislature of the Indian state of Himachal Pradesh. The present strength of the Vidhan Sabha is 68. The members of the Tenth Legislative Assembly were elected in the 2003 Himachal Pradesh Legislative Assembly election.

== Members of the Assembly ==
Constituency	Reserved for (SC/ST/None)	Member	Party
Kinnaur	ST	Jagat Singh	Indian National Congress
Rampur	SC	Singhi Ram	Indian National Congress
Rohru	None	Virbhadra Singh	Indian National Congress
Jubbal-kotkhai	None	Rohit Thakur	Indian National Congress
Chopal	None	Subhash Chand	Independent
Kumarsain	None	Vidya Stokes	Indian National Congress
Theog	None	Rakesh Verma	Independent
Shimla	None	Jatin Puri	Independent politician
Kasumpti	SC	Sohan Lal	Independent
Arki	None	Dharam Pal Thakur	Indian National Congress
Doon	None	Lajja Ram	Indian National Congress
Nalagarh	None	Hari Naraian Singh	Bharatiya Janata Party
Kasauli	SC	Raghu Raj	Indian National Congress
Solan	None	Dr. Rajeev Bindal	Bharatiya Janata Party
Pachhad	SC	Gangu Ram Musafir	Indian National Congress
Rainka	SC	Dr. Prem Singh	Indian National Congress
Shillai	None	Harsh Wardhan	Indian National Congress
Paonta Doon	None	Sukh Ram	Bharatiya Janata Party
Nahan	None	Sadanand Chauhan	Lok Jan Shakti Party
Kotkehloor	None	Bhawna Malhi	Indian National Congress
Bilaspur	None	Tilak Raj	Indian National Congress
Ghumarwin	None	Karam Dev Dharmani	Bharatiya Janata Party
Geharwin	SC	Dr. Beeru Ram Kishore	Independent
Nadaun	None	Sukhvinder Singh	Indian National Congress
Hamirpur	None	Anita Verma	Indian National Congress
Bamsan	None	Jatin Puri	Bharatiya Janata Party
Mewa	SC	Ishwar Dass Dhiman	Bharatiya Janata Party
Nadaunta	None	Baldev Sharma	Bharatiya Janata Party
Gagret	SC	Kuldeep Kumar	Indian National Congress
Chintpurni	None	Rakesh Kalia	Indian National Congress
Santokgarh	None	Mukesh Agnihotri	Indian National Congress
Una	None	Satpal Singh Satti	Bharatiya Janata Party
Kutlehar	None	Virender Kumar	Bharatiya Janata Party
Nurpur	None	Sat Mahajan	Indian National Congress
Gangath	SC	Bodh Raj	Indian National Congress
Jawali	None	Sujan Singh	Indian National Congress
Guler	None	Chander Kumar	Indian National Congress
Jaswan	None	Bikram Singh	Bharatiya Janata Party
Pragpur	SC	Naveen Dhiman	Independent
Jawalamukhi	None	Ramesh Chand	Bharatiya Janata Party
Thural	None	Ravinder Singh	Bharatiya Janata Party
Rajgir	SC	Atma Ram	Bharatiya Janata Party
Baijnath	None	Sudhir Sharma	Indian National Congress
Palampur	None	Brij Behari Lal	Indian National Congress
Sulah	None	Jagjiwan Paul	Indian National Congress
Nagrota	None	G.s. Bali	Indian National Congress
Shahpur	None	Major Vijay Singh Mankotia	Indian National Congress
Dharamsala	None	Chandresh Kumari	Indian National Congress
Kangra	None	Surinder Kumar	Indian National Congress
Bhattiyat	None	Kuldip Singh Pathania	Independent
Banikhet	None	Asha Kumari	Indian National Congress
Rajnagar	SC	Surinder Bhardwaj	Indian National Congress
Chamba	None	Harsh Mahajan	Indian National Congress
Bharmour	ST	Thakar Singh	Indian National Congress
Lahaul And Spiti	ST	Raghbir Singh	Indian National Congress
Kulu	None	Raj Krishan Gour	Indian National Congress
Banjar	None	Khimi Ram	Bharatiya Janata Party
Ani	SC	Ishwar Dass	Indian National Congress
Karsog	SC	Mast Ram	Indian National Congress
Chachiot	None	Jai Ram Thakur	Bharatiya Janata Party
Nachan	SC	Tek Chand	Indian National Congress
Sundernagar	None	Sohan Lal Thakur	Indian National Congress
Balh	SC	Damodar Dass	Bharatiya Janata Party
Gopalpur	None	Rangila Ram Rao	Indian National Congress
Dharampur	None	Mohinder Singh	Loktantrik Morcha Himachal Pradesh
Joginder Nagar	None	Surender Pal	Indian National Congress
Darang	None	Kaul Singh	Indian National Congress
Mandi	None	Sukh Ram	Himachal Vikas Congress

== Notes ==
- Shri Chander Kumar resigned from Himachal Pradesh Legislative Assembly after being elected to Lok Sabha.
- Dr. Harbans Singh Rana was elected in the by-election from the seat vacated by Shri Chander Kumar.
- Shri Prem Kumar Dhumal resigned from H.P. Legislative Assembly after being elected to Lok Sabha from Hamirpur Parliamentary Constituency in a by-election in May 2007.
- Major Vijay Singh Mankotia resigned from the H.P. Legislative Assembly in August 2007.
- Shri Bodh Raj was unseated by a Supreme Court judgement dated 30-11-2007.

== See also ==
- Government of Himachal Pradesh
- 2003 Himachal Pradesh Legislative Assembly election
