= 11th Himachal Pradesh Assembly =

11th Legislative Assembly
- Himachal Pradesh Legislative Assembly

Type
- Type: Unicameral
- Term limits: 5 years

History
- Preceded by: 10th Legislative Assembly
- Succeeded by: 12th Legislative Assembly

Leadership
- Speaker: Tulsi Ram, BJP since 11 January 2008
- Deputy Speaker: Vacant, BJP since 11 January 2008
- Leader of the House (Chief Minister): Prem Kumar Dhumal, BJP since 30 December 2007
- Leader of the Opposition: Vidya Stokes, INC since 22 January 2008

Structure
- Seats: 68
- Political groups: Government (41): BJP (41); Opposition (23): INC (23); BSP (1); Independent (2): IND (2)

Elections
- Voting system: First past the post
- Last election: December 2007
- Next election: 4 November 2012

Meeting place
- Himachal Pradesh Legislative Assembly, Shimla, Himachal Pradesh, India

Website
- Himachal Pradesh Legislative Assembly

The 11th Legislative Assembly of Himachal Pradesh was formed following the 2007 Assembly election for all 68 seats in the unicameral legislature. The term of 13th Assembly will expire in December 2012. 2012 Himachal Pradesh Legislative Assembly election will be conducted to form the next Himachal Pradesh Assembly.

== Assembly Members (Eleventh Legislative Assembly) ==
Constituency	Reserved for (SC/ST/None)	Member	Party
Rampur	SC	Nand Lal	Indian National Congress
Rohru	None	Virbhadra Singh	Indian National Congress
Kinnaur	ST	Tejwant Singh	Bharatiya Janata Party
Jubbal-kotkhai	None	Narinder Bragta	Bharatiya Janata Party
Chopal	None	Subhash Chand Manglate	Indian National Congress
Kumarsain	None	Vidya Stokes	Indian National Congress
Theog	None	Rakesh Verma	Independent
Simla	None	Jatin Puri	Independent politician
Kasumpti	SC	Sohan Lal	Indian National Congress
Arki	None	Gobind Ram	Bharatiya Janata Party
Doon	None	Vinod Kumari	Bharatiya Janata Party
Nalagarh	None	Hari Narayan Singh	Bharatiya Janata Party
Kasauli	SC	Dr. Rajiv Saizal	Bharatiya Janata Party
Solan	None	Dr. Rajeev Bindal	Bharatiya Janata Party
Pachhad	SC	Gangu Ram Musafir	Indian National Congress
Rainka	SC	Dr. Prem Singh	Indian National Congress
Shillai	None	Harshwardhan Chauhan	Indian National Congress
Paonta Doon	None	Sukh Ram	Bharatiya Janata Party
Nahan	None	Kush Parmar	Indian National Congress
Kotkehloor	None	Randhir Sharma	Bharatiya Janata Party
Bilaspur	None	Jagat Prakash Nadda	Bharatiya Janata Party
Ghumarwin	None	Rajesh Dharmani	Indian National Congress
Geharwin	SC	Rikhi Ram Kaundal	Bharatiya Janata Party
Nadaun	None	Sukhvinder Singh Sukhu	Indian National Congress
Hamirpur	None	Urmil Thakur	Bharatiya Janata Party
Bamsan	None	Prof. Prem Kumar Dhumal	Bharatiya Janata Party
Mewa	SC	Ishwar Dass Dhiman	Bharatiya Janata Party
Nadaunta	None	Baldev Sharma	Bharatiya Janata Party
Gagret	SC	Balbir Singh	Bharatiya Janata Party
Chintpurni	None	Rakesh Kalia	Indian National Congress
Santokgarh	None	Mukesh Agnihotri	Indian National Congress
Una	None	Satpal Singh 'satti'	Bharatiya Janata Party
Kutlehar	None	Virender Kanwar	Bharatiya Janata Party
Nurpur	None	Rakesh Pathania	Independent
Gangath	SC	Des Raj	Bharatiya Janata Party
Jawali	None	Rajan Sushant	Bharatiya Janata Party
Guler	None	Neeraj Bharti	Indian National Congress
Jaswan	None	Nikhil Rajour (manu Sharma)	Indian National Congress
Pragpur	SC	Yog Raj	Indian National Congress
Jawalamukhi	None	Ramesh Chand	Bharatiya Janata Party
Thural	None	Ravinder Singh	Bharatiya Janata Party
Rajgir	SC	Atma Ram	Bharatiya Janata Party
Baijnath	None	Sudhir Sharma	Indian National Congress
Palampur	None	Parveen Kumar	Bharatiya Janata Party
Sulah	None	Vipin Singh Parmar	Bharatiya Janata Party
Nagrota	None	G. S. Bali	Indian National Congress
Shahpur	None	Sarveen Choudhary	Bharatiya Janata Party
Dharamsala	None	Kishan Kapoor	Bharatiya Janata Party
Kangra	None	Sanjay Chaudhary	Bahujan Samaj Party
Bhattiyat	None	Kuldeep Singh Pathania	Indian National Congress
Banikhet	None	Renu Chadha	Bharatiya Janata Party
Rajnagar	SC	Surinder Bhardwaj	Indian National Congress
Chamba	None	Bal Krishan Chauhan	Bharatiya Janata Party
Bharmour	ST	Tulsi Ram	Bharatiya Janata Party
Lahaul And Spiti	ST	Dr. Ram Lal Markanda	Bharatiya Janata Party
Kulu	None	Govind Singh Thakur	Bharatiya Janata Party
Banjar	None	Khimi Ram	Bharatiya Janata Party
Ani	SC	Kishori Lal	Bharatiya Janata Party
Karsog	SC	Hira Lal	Independent
Chachiot	None	Jai Ram Thakur	Bharatiya Janata Party
Nachan	SC	Dile Ram	Bharatiya Janata Party
Sundernagar	None	Roop Singh	Bharatiya Janata Party
Balh	SC	Prakash Chaudhary	Indian National Congress
Gopalpur	None	Inder Singh	Bharatiya Janata Party
Dharampur	None	Mahender Singh	Bharatiya Janata Party
Joginder Nagar	None	Gulab Singh	Bharatiya Janata Party
Darang	None	Kaul Singh	Indian National Congress
Mandi	None	Anil Kumar	Indian National Congress

=== Notes ===
- Shri Sanjay Chaudhary lone member of BSP merged his Legislature Group into BJP Legislature Party on 17-12-2008.
- Shri Virbhadra Singh resigned from H.P. Legislative Assembly on 28-05-2009 after being elected to Lok Sabha from Mandi Parliamentary Constituency.
- Shri Rajan Sushant resigned from H.P. Legislative Assembly on 26-05-2009 after being elected to Lok Sabha from Kangra Parliamentary Constituency.
- Shri Khushi Ram Balanatah and Shri Sujan Singh Pathania were elected in the by-election from the seats vacated by Shri Virbhadra Singh and Shri Rajan Sushant respectively.

== See also ==
- Government of Himachal Pradesh
- Eighth Assembly
- Ninth Assembly
- Tenth Assembly
- Twelfth Assembly
