= Vipin Singh Parmar =

Speaker of the Himachal Pradesh Legislative Assembly

Speaker of the Himachal Pradesh Legislative Assembly
- In office 26 February 2020 – 19 December 2022
- Chief Minister: Jai Ram Thakur
- Deputy Speaker: Hans Raj
- Preceded by: Rajeev Bindal, BJP
- Succeeded by: Chander Kumar, INC (Pro Tem)

Cabinet Minister, Government of Himachal Pradesh
- In office 27 December 2017 – 25 February 2020
- Governor: Acharya Devvrat; Kalraj Mishra; Bandaru Dattatreya; Rajendra Arlekar
- Cabinet: Jai Ram Thakur ministry
- Chief Minister: Jai Ram Thakur
- Ministry and Departments: Health; Family Welfare

Member of the Himachal Pradesh Legislative Assembly
- Incumbent
- Assumed office 18 December 2017
- Preceded by: Jagjiwan Paul
- Constituency: Sullah

Personal details
- Born: 15 March 1964 (age 62) Bengaluru, Mysore State, India
- Party: Bharatiya Janata Party
- Spouse: Sharmila Parmar
- Children: Maithila Parmar and Dhanajay Parmar
- Parents: Kanchan Singh Parmar (father); Swarna Parmar (mother)
- Profession: Politician

Vipin Singh Parmar (born 15 March 1964) is an Indian politician and member of the Bharatiya Janata Party, who is the former Speaker of the Himachal Pradesh Legislative Assembly.

== Early life and education ==
Born to Shri Kanchan Singh Parmar, Vipin Singh Parmar received his education with a Bachelor's degree in Arts (B.A.), followed by a degree in Law (L.L.B.) and a Post Graduate Diploma in Computer Applications (PGDCA). His academic pursuits laid the foundation for a versatile and well-rounded personality.

== Family and personal life ==
Vipin Singh Parmar is married to Smt. Sharmila Parmar, and their family includes a son and a daughter. Beyond his political engagements, Parmar remains rooted in agriculture, reflecting a deep connection to the land.

== Political career ==
Parmar's political journey commenced with his active involvement in the Akhil Bharatiya Vidyarthi Parishad (ABVP), where he dedicated seven years to the organization. His roles evolved from being a Co-organising Secretary to eventually becoming an Organising Secretary at the state level. Parmar's contributions were further acknowledged when he became a Member of the National Working Committee of ABVP.

Transitioning into mainstream politics, Parmar took on various leadership roles within the Bharatiya Janata Party (BJP). His political acumen led him to positions such as Incharge of State BJP Yuva Morcha, General Secretary of the Organization in District BJP Kangra, and ultimately the President of District BJP Kangra. He also served as the General Secretary at the state level in BJP, showcasing his commitment to the party's organizational aspects.

Parmar's journey within the BJP continued to ascend as he took on roles like Parliamentary Incharge for BJP Kangra, representing the Palak Parliamentary Constituency, and eventually becoming the Vice President of the State BJP. His multifaceted contributions also extended to the leadership of the HP Khadi Board from 1999 to 2003.

== Legislative career ==
Elected to the State Legislative Assembly in 1998, Vipin Singh Parmar has proven his mettle over the years. His constituents re-elected him in 2007 and again in December 2017. During his tenure as a legislator, Parmar assumed the significant responsibility of Health Minister. In this capacity, he oversaw portfolios related to Medical Education, Ayurveda, and Science and Technology from 27 December 2017 to February 2020.

One of the pivotal chapters of Parmar's political career unfolded when he assumed the prestigious position of Speaker in the Himachal Pradesh Vidhan Sabha on 26 February 2020, holding the role until December 2022.

In the 2022 legislative elections, Vipin Singh Parmar secured his fourth consecutive term as a Member of the State Legislative Assembly. Acknowledging his experience and leadership, he was nominated as a Member of various vital committees, including Public Undertakings, Member Amenities, Business Advisory, and e-Governance-cum-General Purposes Committees.

== Interests and hobbies ==
Beyond the realm of politics, Vipin Singh Parmar finds solace and enjoyment in reading, writing, and music.

== Languages known ==
Fluent in both Hindi and English, Parmar's linguistic abilities contribute to effective communication, crucial in his diverse political roles.
