= Anurag Thakur =

Indian politician (born 1974)

Captain Anurag Singh Thakur
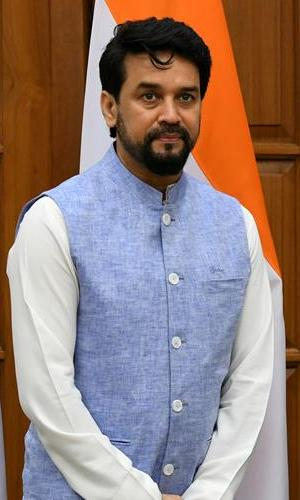
- Thakur in 2021

Union Minister for Information and Broadcasting
- In office 7 July 2021 – 9 June 2024
- Prime Minister: Narendra Modi
- Preceded by: Prakash Javadekar
- Succeeded by: Ashwini Vaishnaw

Union Minister for Youth Affairs and Sports
- In office 7 July 2021 – 9 June 2024
- Prime Minister: Narendra Modi
- Preceded by: Kiren Rijiju
- Succeeded by: Mansukh Mandaviya

Union Minister of State for Finance & Corporate Affairs
- In office 30 May 2019 – 7 July 2021
- Minister: Nirmala Sitharaman
- Succeeded by: Bhagwat Karad; Pankaj Chaudhary

Member of Parliament, Lok Sabha
- Incumbent
- Assumed office 25 May 2008
- Preceded by: Prem Kumar Dhumal
- Constituency: Hamirpur, Himachal Pradesh
- Majority: 1,82,357 (17.42%)

33rd President of the Board of Control for Cricket in India
- In office 22 May 2016 – 2 January 2017
- Preceded by: Shashank Manohar
- Succeeded by: C. K. Khanna (interim)

President of Bharatiya Janata Yuva Morcha
- In office 2011–2016
- Preceded by: Amit Thaker
- Succeeded by: Poonam Mahajan

Personal details
- Born: 24 October 1974 (age 51) Hamirpur, Himachal Pradesh, India
- Party: Bharatiya Janata Party
- Spouse: Shefali Thakur (m. 2002)
- Parent(s): Prem Kumar Dhumal (father); Sheela Dhumal (mother)
- Relatives: Arun Singh Dhumal (brother)
- Education: Doaba College (B.A)
- Occupation: Cricketer; military officer; politician

Military service
- Allegiance: India
- Branch/service: Indian Army
- Years of service: 2016–present
- Rank: Captain
- Unit: Territorial Army

Captain Anurag Singh Thakur (born 24 October 1974) is an Indian politician from the Bharatiya Janata Party and a Member of Parliament in the Lok Sabha from Hamirpur, Himachal Pradesh. He was former Minister of Sports, Youth Affairs and Minister of Information and Broadcasting in the Second Modi ministry. His father, Prem Kumar Dhumal was a former Chief Minister of Himachal Pradesh.

Previously, Thakur served as a Minister of State for Finance and Corporate Affairs. He was first elected to the Lok Sabha in May 2008 in a by poll as a candidate of the Bharatiya Janata Party. Coming from a political family of Himachal Pradesh, he is a long serving, four time Member of Parliament, being a member of 14th, 15th, 16th, and 17th Lok Sabha.

Previously, he was the president of the Board of Control for Cricket in India (BCCI) from May 2015 to February 2017, and had to leave that position after the Supreme Court order on BCCI governance. During his time as BCCI president he operated for some time from West Bengal. On 29 July 2016, he became the first serving Member of Parliament from the BJP to become a regular commissioned officer in the Territorial Army. He was involved in a legal struggle between the Himachal Pradesh State Government and the Himachal Pradesh Cricket Association over the rights to the International Cricket Stadium at Dharamshala. There was also controversy over his appointment as the president of the Board of Control for Cricket in India (BCCI) and he had to leave that position following a Supreme Court order. In 2024, he was elected as MP from Hamirpur constituency in Himachal Pradesh for the 2024 General Elections.

== Early life and education ==
Thakur was born on 24 October 1974 in Hamirpur, Himachal Pradesh and his family belongs to the Hindu Rajput community. He is the elder son of Prem Kumar Dhumal and Sheela Devi. His father, Prem Kumar Dhumal was a former Chief Minister of Himachal Pradesh. He has a younger brother, Arun Singh Dhumal, who is serving as the Chairman of the Indian Premier League and the former Treasurer of the BCCI. He has done his bachelors B.A. degree from Doaba College, Jalandhar, Punjab. He did his schooling from Dayanand Model Sr. Sec. School, Dayanand Nagar, Jalandhar.

== Political career ==
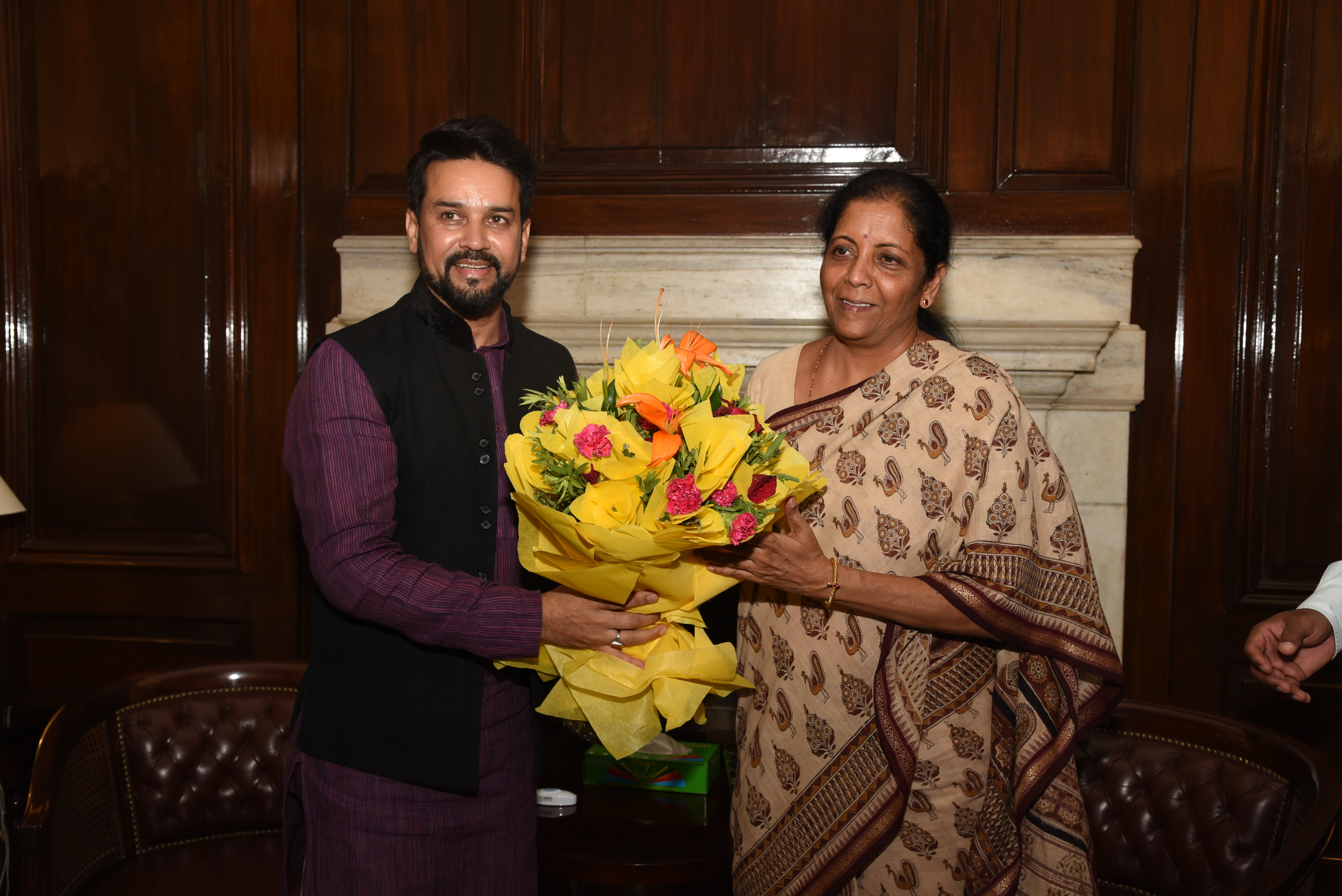
Captain Anurag Thakur meets Smt. Nirmala Sitharaman, Minister of Finance after taking the charge of Minister of State for Finance

In May 2008, Thakur succeeded his father when he was elected as Member of Parliament of India's 14th Lok Sabha from Hamirpur constituency. He was re-elected to the 15th Lok Sabha in 2009, 16th Loksabha in 2014, and 17th Loksabha in 2019. Later, in 2010 Thakur was appointed the national president of Bharatiya Janata Yuva Morcha.

On 19 January 2019 he became the first Bharatiya Janata Party MP to be awarded the Sansad Ratna Award, an award established in 2010 for recognizing contributions by parliamentarians.

=== Minister ===
In May 2019, Thakur became Minister of State for Finance and Corporate Affairs.

On 7 July 2021, Thakur was appointed as the Minister of Youth Affairs and Sports and Minister of Information & Broadcasting in the Second Modi ministry as part of changes in the Union Council of Ministers.

=== Goli Maro chants ===
In the 2020 Delhi elections, Thakur, along with others including BJP leader Pravesh Verma, was accused of being one of the leaders who incited communal tension in Delhi using the inflammatory slogan "traitors of the country (Desh ke Gaddaron ko)", to which his audience replied "shoot the bastards (Goli maro salon ko)", which were repeated by him in January 2020 at a BJP rally. He denied the allegations on being questioned about these statements. The Election Commission of India ordered that Thakur be removed from the BJP's list of star campaigners and then imposed a 72-hour campaigning ban on him. Following Thakur's speech, at least three incidents were reported in which Anti-CAA protestors were fired upon.

On August 26, 2020, an ACMM rejected the petition filed by Communist Party of India Marxist leader Brinda Karat under Section 156(3) of the Code of Criminal Procedure (CrPC), seeking registration of first information report (FIR) against Thakur and Pravesh Verma, on the ground that the petitioner did not have previous sanction required as per law. On 13 June 2022, the Delhi High Court also dismissed the plea filed by Karat, challenging the trial court’s refusal, on the ground that the complainant had failed to follow the prescribed mechanism under CrPC.

The matter is presently sub-judice before the Supreme Court of India, which has issued notice to Delhi Police in the given matter.

== Cricket career ==
=== Professional player ===
Anurag Thakur played a Ranji Trophy match against Jammu & Kashmir in November 2000 when he was the president of HPCA. He has played one match in first-class cricket representing Himachal Pradesh and leading the team as captain in a match against Jammu and Kashmir in the 2000/2001 season. Jammu and Kashmir won by 4 wickets. He "picked himself" for the match so as to fulfill the BCCI criterion (which requires state administrators to have at least one first-class match experience) for becoming a selector at the state level. After the match, he appointed himself as the chairman of selectors of HPCA Ranji trophy cricket team.

This debut was his one and only first-class cricket match. This experience in first-class cricket enabled his induction into the BCCI national junior selection committee, satisfying the condition that only first-class players could be national selectors.

=== Administrative head ===
Anurag Thakur served as the president of the Himachal Pradesh Cricket Association for four straight terms since 2000. His tenure saw development of five stadium in Himachal Pradesh including the stadium in Dharamsala.

He was the president of the Board of Control for Cricket of India order on 2 January 2017. Early on in his administrative tenure, he gained fame for possibly being the first cricketer to have made his first-class debut after taking over as the president of the Himachal Pradesh Cricket Association (HPCA) in July 2000.

=== Appointment as BCCI president ===
Thakur rose through the ranks in cricketing administration bodies to the position of secretary for BCCI. On 22 May 2016, Anurag Thakur became the president of BCCI, but his tenure was cut short when the Supreme Court of India ruled on the Lodha Committee's third status report, submitted on 14 November 2016, asking for the disqualification of office-bearers of the BCCI and all state associations, who became ineligible as per the Apex Court's 18 July 2016 order.

The court dismissed Thakur on 2 January 2017 for defying its 2016 order to implement the Lodha Committee reforms. It also initiated contempt proceedings against Thakur for what it prima facie deemed as perjury about his correspondence with the International Cricket Council. He submitted an affidavit of apology to the court which was rejected, following which he filed an unconditional and unequivocal apology. The court finally relented and dropped its contempt and perjury proceedings against him.

== Personal life ==
Thakur decided at the age of 13 that he will not use his father's surname Dhumal. Thakur married Shefali Thakur, daughter of Gulab Singh Thakur, former Minister in the Government of Himachal Pradesh, on 27 November 2002.

== Territorial Army ==
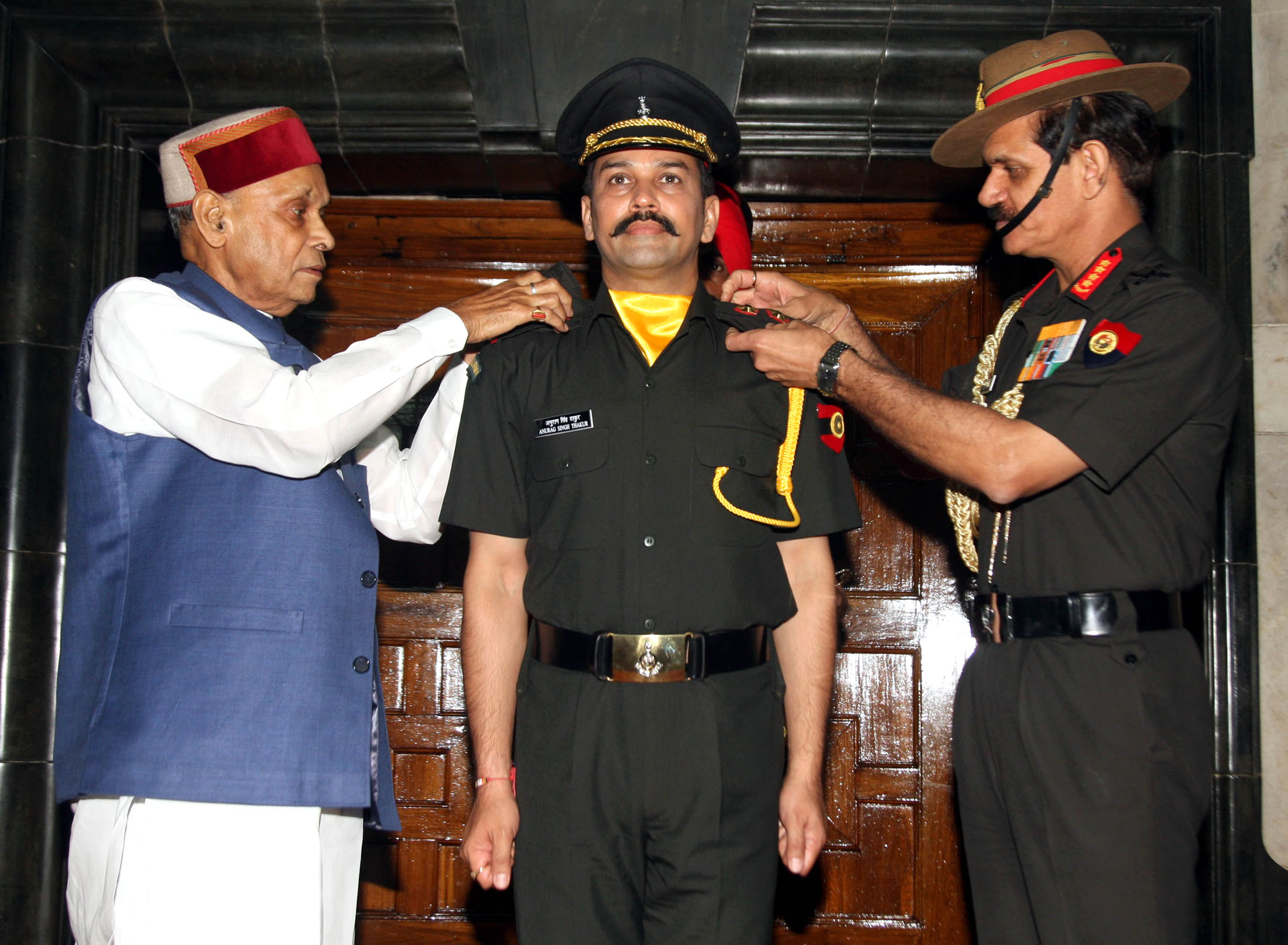
(Right side) The then Chief of Army Staff, General Dalbir Singh and (left side) his father Shri Prem Kumar Dhumal, former Chief Minister of Himachal Pradesh conferring the rank of Lieutenant in the Territorial Army (TA) on Shri Anurag Singh Thakur, Member of Parliament and President BCCI, at a solemn ‘Commissioning’ ceremony, in New Delhi on 29 July 2016.

In July 2016, Anurag Thakur became a part of the Territorial Army, becoming the first serving BJP Member of Parliament to become a TA Officer. He has been promoted to the rank of captain.

Lok Sabha
Preceded by Prem Kumar Dhumal	Member of Parliament for Hamirpur; 2008 – Present	Incumbent
Political offices
Preceded by Kiren Rijiju	Minister of Youth Affairs and Sports; 7 July 2021 – Present	Incumbent
Preceded by Prakash Javadekar	Minister of Information and Broadcasting; 7 July 2021 - Present	Incumbent
