= Garli Assembly constituency =

Constituency of the Himachal Pradesh legislative assembly in India

Coordinates: 31.81°N 76.24°E

Garli
- Former constituency for the Himachal Pradesh Legislative Assembly

Constituency details
- Country: India
- Region: North India
- State: Himachal Pradesh
- District: Kangra
- Established: 1972
- Abolished: 1972
- Total electors: 25,128

Garli Assembly constituency was an assembly constituency in the India state of Himachal Pradesh.

== Members of the Legislative Assembly ==
Election	Member	Party
1972	Dalip Singh	Indian National Congress

== Election results ==
=== Assembly Election 1972 ===
1972 Himachal Pradesh Legislative Assembly election: Garli
Party	Candidate	Votes	%	±%
INC	Dalip Singh	4,033	36.09%	New
Independent	Mangat Ram	3,770	33.73%	New
Independent	Yog Raj	1,655	14.81%	New
ABJS	Bali Ram	881	7.88%	New
Independent	Bhagat Ram	437	3.91%	New
INC(O)	Babu Ram	400	3.58%	New
Margin of victory		263	2.35%	
Turnout		11,176	45.95%	
Registered electors		25,128		
INC win (new seat)				
