= Doaba College =

College in Punjab, India

- Other name: DCJ
- Parent institution: Arya Shiksha Mandal
- Chairman: Dhruv Mittal
- President: Chander Mohan
- Principal: Dr. Pardeep Bhandari
- Location: Jalandhar, Punjab, India, Jalandhar, India; 31.3424°N 75.5857°E
- Campus: 22 Acres; 21 acres (8.5 ha)
- Website: doabacollege.net

Doaba College, Jalandhar is a multi-faculty postgraduate co-educational institution of Northern India which serves the Doaba region. The college has been accredited by the National Assessment and Accreditation Council, an autonomous body of the University Grants Commission of India (UGC).

Doaba College, Jalandhar was established on 1 January 1941 by Sh. Bindraban Sondhi, Rai Bahadur Badri Dass, Sh. Jagan Nath Mittal and Acharaya Lajja Vati. They followed Arya Samaj and the Spartan Freedom Fighters who laid the foundation of Doaba College to promote the study of classical Sanskrit, Hindi and the teachings of Vedic Dharma, Gandhian values and to promote the philosophy of Maharishi Dayanand Saraswati. Mehta Jaiminee Jee of Arya Samaj laid the foundation of Doaba college in 1897 and converted the Doaba school into the Doaba College, however because of financial reasons, it did not continue after unknown period. Mehta Jaiminee Jee was the first principal.

Their mission was to impart education by the less and badely paid and economically weaker section of teachers different subjects , by Self Graduate teachers to their Post Graduate Students. A small building was constructed in 1941 and thereafter the expansion of the college was undertaken in 1943. Sh. Bindraban Sondhi collected funds for the college. Ever since, the institution has been under the leadership of earlier Rai Bahadur Badri Das, Seth Stya Paul, and now Sh. Chander Mohan.

Chief-Editor, Daily Vir Pratap and the President of Arya Shiksha Mandal. The college provides courses in Computer Education & I.T. Biotechnology, Commerce & Management, Journalism & Mass Communication, Tourism and Hotel Management in addition to traditional courses in the faculties of Science, Commerce and the Arts.

This college has a Commerce and Business Management block, Media and I.T. block, Audio-Video Media Studio, an English Language Lab, Arts block, postgraduate block, laboratories (Computer Science, Physics, Chemistry, Biotechnology and Food technology labs).

== Notable alumni ==
- Yash Chopra, Dada Saheb Phalke Awardee, Indian Director
- Vijay Kumar Chopra, Chief editor of Punjab Kesari
- Prem Kumar Dhumal, Chief Minister of Himachal Pradesh,
- Manoranjan Kalia,
- Gurpreet Ghuggi, comedian
- Roger Nair, Canadian Film maker, VC of Ontario Creates
- Anurag Thakur, Union Minister of India
- Lord Swraj Paul
