= Chander Mohan (journalist) =

Indian journalist

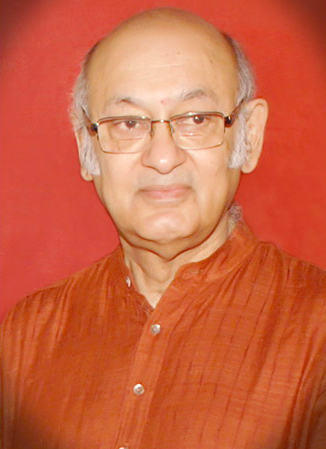
- Born: Chander Mohan; 7 February 1946 (age 80); Lahore, Pakistan
- Education: Post Graduation in English from Punjab University, Chandigarh; He is a Scholarship holder in Journalism from Ceteka, Prague Czechoslovakia.

Chander Mohan (born 7 February 1946) is the grandson of editor Mahashya Krishan, who started Pratap in Lahore in 1919. He is the son of Shri Virendra who was a freedom fighter, editor, educationist and Arya Samaj leader.

== Career ==
Chander Mohan is a senior editor and Journalist. He has been the Editor for the last 30 years of Daily Vir Pratap, Jalandhar oldest Hindi newspaper of north west India. He is also contributing a weekly column to major National Hindi dailies. He is also a popular TV Commentator. He gives his comments on news once a week on the popular "Khas Khabar Ek Nazar" Programme of DD Punjabi. Chander Mohan is a known educationist and contributed to the educational field. He is also President of prestigious body Arya Shiksha Mandal a 100-year-old educational society and it runs five institutions of higher education at both college and school level. Kanya Maha Vidyalaya, Doaba College, Sanskriti KMV School, Jullunder Model School, Dev Raj Senior Secondary School and Dev Raj Public School are being run by the governing body of this society. Chander Mohan has been leading the Arya Shiksha Mandal as president for the past 27 years. The governing body of Arya Shiksha Mandal and all members elected Chander Mohan consecutively tenth time in a row at the annual meeting of the body held on 30 December 2020.

His articles are widely acknowledged in Daily Newspapers Punjab Kesri, Vir Pratap, Dawn, Times of India and other daily news papers. Recent such article is "An India-Pakistan wartime friendship in Prague" in Dawn.

== Awards ==
Widely travelled in the world. He has been recipient of the Rotary Award for World Understanding. He was also bestowed Honorary Citizenship of Nashville, capital of Tennessee province of USA.

== Contribution to society ==
He is also a Trustee of Gulab Devi Hospital Trust which was started by Lala Lajpat Rai.
