= Himachal Pradesh Council of Ministers =

Executive branch of the government of Himachal Pradesh, India

The Himachal Pradesh Council of Ministers is the executive wing of Government of Himachal Pradesh and headed by Chief Minister of Himachal Pradesh, who is the head of government and leader of the state cabinet. The term of every executive wing is for 5 years. The council of ministers are assisted by department secretaries attached to each ministry who are from IAS Himachal Pradesh Cadre. The chief executive officer responsible for issuing orders on behalf of government is Chief Secretary to the state government.

== Constitutional requirement ==
=== For the Council of Ministers to aid and advise Governor ===
According to Article 163 of the Indian Constitution,

# There shall be a Council of Ministers with the Chief Minister at the head to aid and advise the Governor in the exercise of his function, except in so far as he is by or under this Constitution required to exercise his functions or any of them in his discretion.

1. If any question arises whether any matter is or is not a matter as respects which the Governor is by or under this Constitution required to act in his discretion, the decision of the Governor in his discretion shall be final, and the validity of anything done by the Governor shall not be called in question on the ground that he ought or ought not to have acted in his discretion.
2. The question whether any, and if so what, advice was tendered by Ministers to the Governor shall not be inquired into in any court.

This means that the Ministers serve under the pleasure of the Governor and he/she may remove them, on the advice of the Chief Minister, whenever they want.

=== For other provisions as to Ministers ===
According to Article 164 of the Indian Constitution,

# The Chief Minister shall be appointed by the Governor and the other Ministers shall be appointed by the Governor on the advice of the Chief Minister, and the Minister shall hold office during the pleasure of the Governor:
Provided that in the States of Bihar, Madhya Pradesh and Orissa, there shall be a Minister in charge of tribal welfare who may in addition be in charge of the welfare of the Scheduled Castes and backward classes or any other work.

1. The Council of Minister shall be collectively responsible to the Legislative Assembly of the State.
2. Before a Minister enters upon his office, the Governor shall administer to him the oaths of office and of secrecy according to the forms set out for the purpose in the Third Schedule.
3. A Minister who for any period of six consecutive months is not a member of the Legislature of the State shall at the expiration of that period cease to be a Minister.
4. The salaries and allowances of Ministers shall be such as the Legislature of the State may from time to time by law determine and, until the Legislature of the State so determines, shall be a specified in the Second Schedule.

== Council of Ministers ==
Cabinet members
Portfolio	Minister	Took office	Left office	Party
Chief Minister; Finance; General Administration; Home; Planning; Personnel; All other departments not allotted to any other Minister	Sukhvinder Singh Sukhu	11 December 2022	Incumbent	INC
Deputy Chief Minister; Jal Shakti; Transport; Language, Arts & Culture	Mukesh Agnihotri	11 December 2022	Incumbent	INC
Minister of Health & Family Welfare; Minister of Social Justice & Empowerment; Minister of Labour & Employment	Dhani Ram Shandil	8 January 2023	Incumbent	INC
Minister of Agriculture; Minister of Animal Husbandry	Chander Kumar	8 January 2023	Incumbent	INC
Minister of Industries; Minister of Parliamentary Affairs	Harshwardhan Chauhan	8 January 2023	Incumbent	INC
Minister of Revenue; Minister of Horticulture; Minister of Tribal Development	Jagat Singh Negi	8 January 2023	Incumbent	INC
Minister of Higher Education & Elementary Education	Rohit Thakur	8 January 2023	Incumbent	INC
Minister of Rural Development & Panchayati Raj	Anirudh Singh	8 January 2023	Incumbent	INC
Minister of Public Works; Minister of Urban Development	Vikramaditya Singh	8 January 2023	Incumbent	INC
Minister of Technical Education; Minister of Vocational & Industrial Training	Rajesh Dharmani	12 December 2023	Incumbent	INC
Minister of Ayush; Minister of Youth Services & Sports	Yadvinder Goma	12 December 2023	Incumbent	INC

== Oath as the state chief minister/minister ==
I, <Name of Chief Minister/Minister>, do swear in the name of God/solemnly affirm that I will bear true faith and allegiance to the Constitution of India as by law established, that I will uphold the sovereignty and integrity of India, that I will faithfully and conscientiously discharge my duties as a Minister for the State of () and that I will do right to all manner of people in accordance with the Constitution and the law without fear or favour, affection or ill-will.
