= Himachal Pradesh Legislative Assembly =

Unicameral legislature of the Indian state of Himachal Pradesh

- 14th Himachal Pradesh Assembly

Type
- Type: Unicameral
- Term limits: 5 years

History
- Founded: 1 October 1963 (63 years ago)

Leadership
- Speaker: Kuldeep Singh Pathania, INC since 5 January 2023
- Deputy Speaker: Vacant since 22 November 2025
- Leader of the House (Chief Minister): Sukhvinder Singh Sukhu, INC since 11 December 2022
- Deputy Leader of the House (Deputy Chief Minister): Mukesh Agnihotri, INC since 11 December 2022
- Leader of the Opposition: Jai Ram Thakur, BJP since 25 December 2022

Structure
- Seats: 68
- Political groups: Government (39): INC (40); Opposition (28): BJP (28); Vacant (1) (Note: Death of Congress MLA Nand Lal on 3 November 2026)

Elections
- Voting system: First past the post
- Last election: 12 November 2022
- Next election: 2027

Meeting place
- Vidhan Bhavan, Shimla
- Vidhan Bhavan, Dharamshala (Winter session)

Website
- https://hpvidhansabha.nic.in/

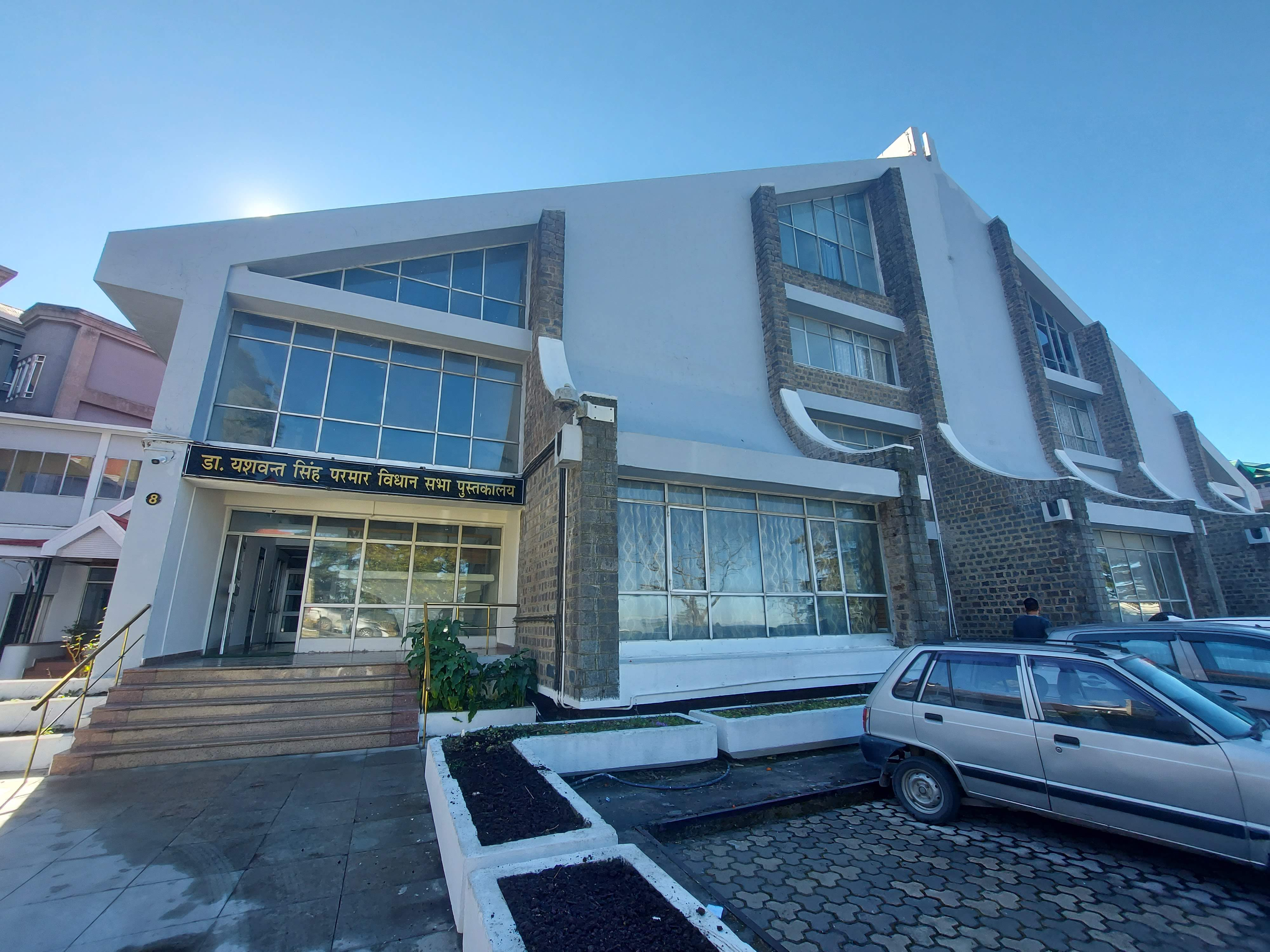
Himachal Pradesh Vidhan Sabha Library

The Himachal Pradesh Legislative Assembly is the unicameral legislature of the Indian state of Himachal Pradesh. The seat of the Assembly is at Shimla, the capital of the state. There are 68 Members of Legislative Assembly, all directly elected from single-seat constituencies. Its term is 5 years, unless sooner dissolved.

== History ==
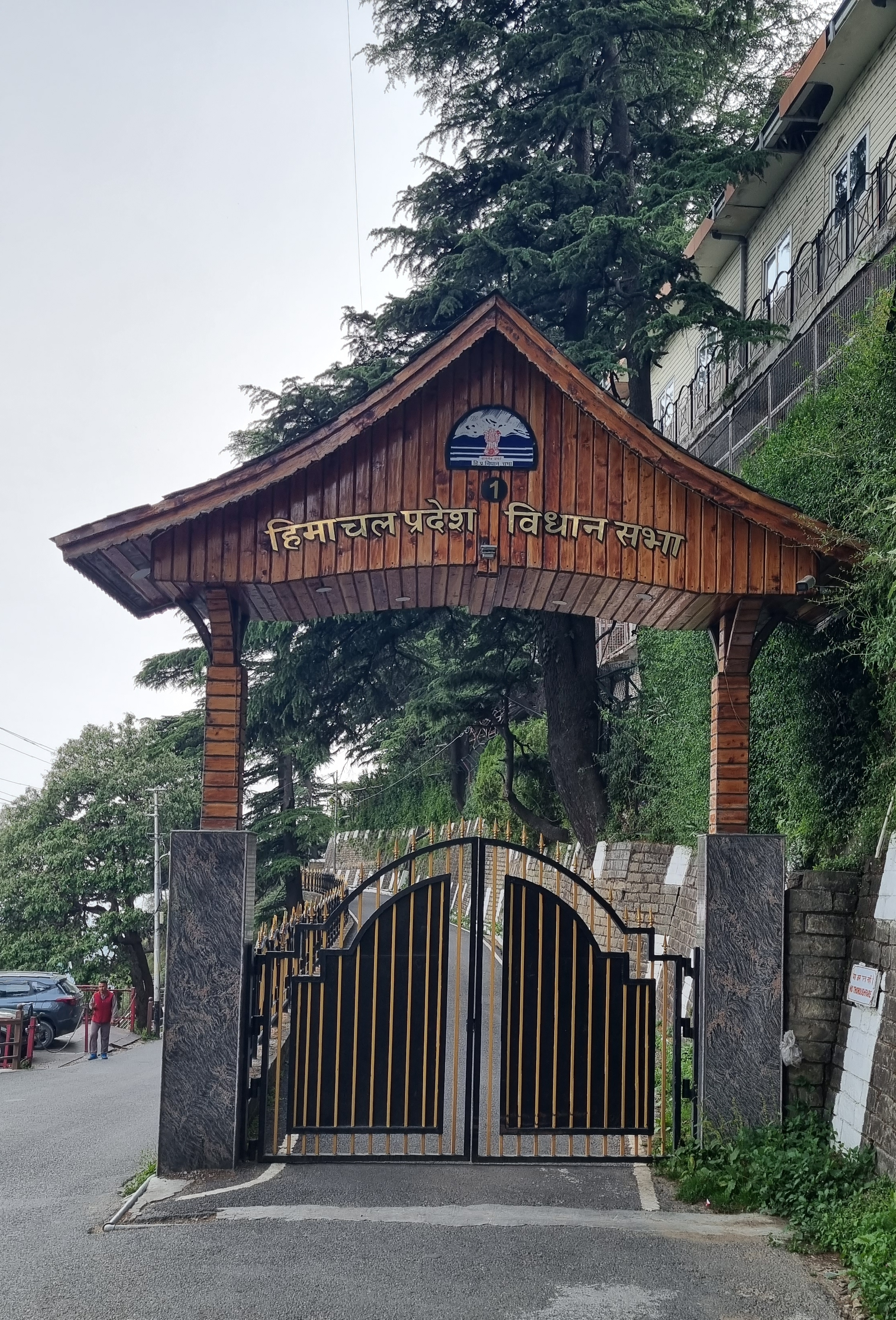
Front gate of the Himachal Pradesh Legislative Assembly

Himachal Pradesh was the first state in India to launch a paperless legislative assembly.

== List of assemblies ==
Election year	Assembly	Ruling party	Chief Minister	Seats
1952–1957	Legislative Assembly of Part-C State of Himachal Pradesh	Indian National Congress	Yashwant Singh Parmar	INC: 24; IND: 8; KMPP: 3; SCF:1 Total: 36
1957–1962	Territorial Council	Indian National Congress	Thakur Karam Singh	
1962–1967	First Assembly	Indian National Congress	Yashwant Singh Parmar (2)	
1967–1972	Second Assembly	Indian National Congress	Yashwant Singh Parmar (3)	INC: 34; IND: 16; ABJS: 7; CPI(M): 2; SP:1 Total: 60
1972–1977	Third Assembly	Indian National Congress	Yashwant Singh Parmar (4)	INC: 53; IND: 7; ABJS: 5; LRP: 2; CPI(M): 1; SP:1 Total: 68
1977–1982	Fourth Assembly	Janata Party	Shanta Kumar	JP: 53; INC: 9; IND: 6 Total: 68
1982–1985	Fifth Assembly	Indian National Congress	Thakur Ram Lal	INC: 31; BJP: 29; IND: 6; JP: 3 Total: 68
1982–1985	Fifth Assembly	Indian National Congress	Virbhadra Singh	INC: 31; BJP: 29; IND: 6; JP: 3 Total: 68
1985–1990	Sixth Assembly	Indian National Congress	Virbhadra Singh (2)	INC: 58; BJP: 7; IND: 2; LD: 1 Total: 68
1990–1992	Seventh Assembly	Bharatiya Janata Party	Shanta Kumar (2)	BJP: 46; JD: 1; INC: 9; IND: 1; CPI(M): 1 Total: 68
1993–1998	Eighth Assembly	Indian National Congress	Virbhadra Singh (3)	INC: 52; BJP: 8; IND: 7; CPI(M): 1 Total: 68
1998–2003	Ninth Assembly	Bharatiya Janata Party	Prem Kumar Dhumal	BJP: 31; INC: 31; HVC:5; IND:1 Total: 68
2003–2007	Tenth Assembly	Indian National Congress	Virbhadra Singh (4)	INC: 43; BJP: 16; IND: 6; HVC: 1; LJP: 1; LMHP: 1 Total: 68
2007–2012	Eleventh Assembly	Bharatiya Janata Party	Prem Kumar Dhumal (2)	BJP:41; INC: 23; IND: 3; BSP:1 Total: 68
2012–2017	Twelfth Assembly	Indian National Congress	Virbhadra Singh (5)	INC: 36; BJP: 26; IND:6 Total: 68
2017–2022	Thirteenth Assembly	Bharatiya Janata Party	Jai Ram Thakur	BJP: 44; INC: 21; IND: 2; CPI(M):1 Total: 68
2022–	Fourteenth Assembly	Indian National Congress	Sukhvinder Singh Sukhu (Jatin)	INC: 39; BJP: 28 Total: 68

== Members of Legislative Assembly ==
District	Constituency	Name	Party		Remarks	Lok Sabha constituency			
Chamba	Churah (SC)	Hans Raj		Bharatiya Janata Party		Kangra			
Chamba	Bharmour (ST)	Janak Raj		Bharatiya Janata Party		Kangra			
Chamba	Chamba	Neeraj Nayar		Indian National Congress		Kangra			
Chamba	Dalhousie	D S Thakur		Bharatiya Janata Party		Kangra			
Chamba	Bhattiyat	Kuldeep Singh Pathania		Indian National Congress	Speaker	Kangra			
Kangra	Nurpur	Ranveer Singh		Bharatiya Janata Party		Kangra			
Kangra	Indora (SC)	Malender Rajan		Indian National Congress		Kangra			
Kangra	Fatehpur	Bhawani Singh Pathania		Indian National Congress		Kangra			
Kangra	Jawali	Chander Kumar		Indian National Congress	Cabinet Minister	Kangra			
Kangra	Dehra	Hoshyar Singh		Independent	Resigned on 22 March 2024	Hamirpur			
Kangra	Dehra	Kamlesh Thakur		Indian National Congress	Elected on 13 Jul 2024	Hamirpur			
Kangra	Jaswan-Pragpur	Bikram Thakur		Bharatiya Janata Party		Hamirpur			
Kangra	Jawalamukhi	Sanjay Rattan		Indian National Congress		Kangra			
Kangra	Jaisinghpur (SC)	Yadvinder Goma		Indian National Congress	Cabinet Minister	Kangra			
Kangra	Sullah	Vipin Singh Parmar		Bharatiya Janata Party		Kangra			
Kangra	Nagrota	Raghubir Singh Bali		Indian National Congress		Kangra			
Kangra	Kangra	Pawan Kumar Kajal		Bharatiya Janata Party		Kangra			
Kangra	Shahpur	Kewal Singh Pathania		Indian National Congress		Kangra			
Kangra	Dharamshala	Sudhir Sharma		Indian National Congress	Disqualified on 28 February 2024	Kangra			
Kangra	Dharamshala	Sudhir Sharma		Bharatiya Janata Party	Elected on 4 Jun 2024	Kangra			
Kangra	Palampur	Ashish Butail		Indian National Congress		Kangra			
Kangra	Baijnath (SC)	Kishori Lal		Indian National Congress		Kangra			
Lahaul and Spiti	Lahaul and Spiti (ST)	Ravi Thakur		Indian National Congress	Disqualified on 28 February 2024	Mandi			
Lahaul and Spiti	Lahaul and Spiti (ST)	Anuradha Rana		Indian National Congress	Elected on 4 Jun 2024	Mandi			
Kullu	Manali	Bhuvneshwar Gaur		Indian National Congress		Mandi			
Kullu	Kullu	Sunder Singh Thakur		Indian National Congress		Mandi			
Kullu	Banjar	Surender Shourie		Bharatiya Janata Party		Mandi			
Kullu	Anni (SC)	Lokendra Kumar		Bharatiya Janata Party		Mandi			
Mandi	Karsog (SC)	Deepraj Kapoor		Bharatiya Janata Party		Mandi			
Mandi	Sundernagar	Rakesh Jamwal		Bharatiya Janata Party		Mandi			
Mandi	Nachan (SC)	Vinod Kumar (politician)		Bharatiya Janata Party		Mandi			
Mandi	Seraj	Jai Ram Thakur		Bharatiya Janata Party	Leader of Opposition	Mandi			
Mandi	Darang	Puranchand Thakur		Bharatiya Janata Party		Mandi			
Mandi	Jogindernagar	Prakash Rana		Bharatiya Janata Party		Mandi			
Mandi	Dharampur	Chandershekhar		Indian National Congress		Hamirpur			
Mandi	Mandi	Anil Sharma		Bharatiya Janata Party		Mandi			
Mandi	Balh (SC)	Inder Singh Gandhi		Bharatiya Janata Party		Mandi			
Mandi	Sarkaghat	Dalip Thakur		Bharatiya Janata Party		Mandi			
Hamirpur	Bhoranj (SC)	Suresh Kumar		Indian National Congress		Hamirpur			
Hamirpur	Sujanpur	Rajinder Singh Rana		Indian National Congress	Disqualified on 28 February 2024	Hamirpur			
Hamirpur	Sujanpur	Ranjit Singh		Indian National Congress	Elected on 4 Jun 2024	Hamirpur			
Hamirpur	Hamirpur	Ashish Sharma		Independent	Resigned on 22 March 2024	Hamirpur			
Hamirpur	Hamirpur	Ashish Sharma		Bharatiya Janata Party	Elected on 13 July 2024	Hamirpur			
Hamirpur	Barsar	Inder Dutt Lakhanpal		Indian National Congress	Disqualified on 28 February 2024	Hamirpur			
Hamirpur	Barsar	Inder Dutt Lakhanpal		Bharatiya Janata Party	Elected on 4 Jun 2024	Hamirpur			
Hamirpur	Nadaun	Sukhvinder Singh Sukhu		Indian National Congress	Chief Minister	Hamirpur			
Una	Chintpurni (SC)	Sudarshan Singh Babloo		Indian National Congress		Hamirpur			
Una	Gagret	Chaitanya Sharma		Indian National Congress	Disqualified on 28 February 2024	Hamirpur			
Una	Gagret	Rakesh Kalia		Indian National Congress	Elected on 4 Jun 2024	Hamirpur			
Una	Haroli	Mukesh Agnihotri		Indian National Congress	Deputy Chief Minister	Hamirpur			
Una	Una	Satpal Singh Satti		Bharatiya Janata Party		Hamirpur			
Una	Kutlehar	Devender Kumar Bhutto		Indian National Congress	Disqualified on 28 February 2024	Hamirpur			
Una	Kutlehar	Vivek Sharma		Indian National Congress	Elected on 4 Jun 2024	Hamirpur			
Bilaspur	Jhanduta (SC)	Jeet Ram Katwal		Bharatiya Janata Party		Hamirpur			
Bilaspur	Ghumarwin	Rajesh Dharmani		Indian National Congress	Cabinet Minister	Hamirpur			
Bilaspur	Bilaspur	Trilok Jamwal		Bharatiya Janata Party		Hamirpur			
Bilaspur	Sri Naina Deviji	Randhir Sharma		Bharatiya Janata Party		Hamirpur			
Solan	Arki	Sanjay Awasthy		Indian National Congress		Shimla			
Solan	Nalagarh	K.L. Thakur		Independent	Resigned on 22 March 2024	Shimla			
Solan	Nalagarh	Hardeep Singh Bawa		Indian National Congress	Elected on 13 July 2024	Shimla			
Solan	Doon	Ram Kumar Chaudhary		Indian National Congress		Shimla			
Solan	Solan (SC)	Dhani Ram Shandil		Indian National Congress	Cabinet Minister	Shimla			
Solan	Kasauli (SC)	Vinod Sultanpuri		Indian National Congress		Shimla			
Sirmaur	Pachhad (SC)	Reena Kashyap		Bharatiya Janata Party		Shimla			
Sirmaur	Nahan	Ajay Solanki		Indian National Congress		Shimla			
Sirmaur	Sri Renukaji (SC)	Vinay Kumar		Indian National Congress	Ex Deputy Speaker	Shimla			
Sirmaur	Paonta Sahib	Sukh Ram Chaudhary		Bharatiya Janata Party		Shimla			
Sirmaur	Shillai	Harshwardhan Chauhan		Indian National Congress	Cabinet Minister	Shimla			
Shimla	Chopal	Balbir Singh Verma		Bharatiya Janata Party		Shimla			
Shimla	Theog	Kuldeep Singh Rathore		Indian National Congress		Shimla			
Shimla	Kasumpti	Anirudh Singh		Indian National Congress	Cabinet Minister	Shimla			
Shimla	Shimla	Harish Janartha		Indian National Congress		Shimla			
Shimla	Shimla Rural	Vikramaditya Singh		Indian National Congress	Cabinet minister	Shimla			
Shimla	Jubbal-Kotkhai	Rohit Thakur		Indian National Congress	Cabinet minister	Shimla			
Shimla	Rampur (SC)	Nand Lal		Indian National Congress	Died on 3 November 2026; By- elections necessited|-	Shimla	Rohru (SC)	Mohan Lal Brakta	Indian National Congress
Shimla	Kinnaur	Kinnaur (ST)	Jagat Singh Negi		Indian National Congress	Shimla	Cabinet Minister		

== List of speakers and deputy speakers ==
=== List of speakers ===
List of speakers of Himachal Pradesh (1963–71) (union territory with legislature)
No. of Assembly & its period	Date of its first sitting	Speaker	Time period	
No. of Assembly & its period	Date of its first sitting	Speaker	From	To
1st (Territorial Council)	3 October 1963	Desh Raj Mahajan ji	4 October 1963	18 March 1967
2nd (1967 elections)	18 March 1967	Desh Raj Mahajan	20 March 1967	19 March 1972
List of speakers of Himachal Pradesh (1971–present) (state)
3rd (1972 election)	27 March 1972	Kultar Chand Rana	28 March 1972	9 June 1977
4th (1977 election)	29 June 1977	Sarvan Kumar	30 June 1977	18 April 1979
4th (1977 election)	29 June 1977	T.S. Negi	8 May 1979	21 June 1982
5th (1982 election)	21 June 1982	T.S. Negi	22 June 1982	14 September 1984
6th (1985 elections)	11 March 1985	Vidya Stokes	11 March 1985	19 March 1990
7th (1990 elections)	21 March 1990	Radha Raman Shastri	21 March 1990	17 August 1990
7th (1990 elections)	21 March 1990	T.S. Negi	20 August 1990	14 December 1993
8th (1993 elections)	15 December 1993	Kaul Singh Thakur	15 December 1993	12 March 1998
9th (1998 elections)	12 March 1998	Gulab Singh Thakur	30 March 1998	7 March 2003
10th (2003 elections)	10 March 2003	G.R. Mussafir	10 March 2003	4 January 2007
11th (2007 elections)	11 January 2007	Tulsi Ram	11 January 2007	9 January 2013
12th (2012 elections)	9 January 2013	Brij Behari Lal Butail	9 January 2013	10 January 2018
13th (2017 elections)	10 January 2018	Rajeev Bindal	10 January 2018	26 February 2020
13th (2017 elections)	10 January 2018	Vipin Singh Parmar	26 February 2020	10 December 2022
14th (2022 elections)	19 December 2022	Kuldeep Singh Pathania	5 January 2023	Incumbent

=== List of deputy speakers ===
List of deputy speakers of Himachal Pradesh (1963–71) (union territory with legislature)
No. of Assembly & its period	Date of its first sitting	Deputy Speaker	Time period	
No. of Assembly & its period	Date of its first sitting	Deputy Speaker	From	To
1st (Territorial Council)	3 October 1963	Tapendra Singh	17 October 1963	12 January 1967
2nd (1967 elections)	18 March 1967	Amin Chand	29 March 1967	17 March 1972
List of deputy speakers of Himachal Pradesh (1971–present) (state)
3rd (1972 election)	27 March 1972	Lekh Ram Thakur	30 March 1972	21 April 1977
4th (1977 election)	29 June 1977	Ranjit Singh Verma	4 July 1977	9 May 1977
5th (1982 election)	21 June 1982	Vijay Kumar Joshi	29 June 1982	23 January 1985
6th (1985 elections)	11 March 1985	Dev Raj Negi	7 March 1986	16 March 1989
7th (1990 elections)	21 March 1990	Ram Nath Sharma	29 March 1989	3 March 1990
7th (1990 elections)	21 March 1990	Rikhi Ram Kaundalh	17 August 1990	15 December 1992
8th (1993 elections)	15 December 1993	Kuldip Kumar	17 December 1993	18 October 1995
8th (1993 elections)	15 December 1993	Ishwar Dass	31 October 1995	23December1997
9th (1998 elections)	12 March 1998	Ram Dass Malanger	20 August 1999	28 January 2003
10th (2003 elections)	10 March 2003	Dharam Pal Thakur	27 March 2003	30 December 2007
11th (2007 elections)	11 January 2007	Vacant		
12th (2012 elections)	9 January 2013	Jagat Singh Negi	12 March 2013	21 December 2017
13th (2017 elections)	10 January 2018	Hans Raj	10 January 2018	10 December 2022
14th (2022 elections)	19 December 2022	Vinay Kumar	19 December 2023	22 November 2025

== List of Leaders of the House ==
The Chief Commissioner's Province of Himachal Pradesh was formed on 15 April 1948 through the integration of 30 erstwhile princely-states. In 1951, Himachal Pradejsh become a Part C state, under the Government of Part C State, 1951 and was brought under a lieutenant governor with 36-member Legislative Assembly. First elections to the Assembly were held in 1952. The Indian National Congress won 24 seats to form a government under Yashwant Singh Parmar.

Chief ministers of Bilaspur State (1950–1954)
Portrait	Name	Constituency	Term of office			Assembly
	Anand Chand	N/A	12 October 1948	26 January 1950	1 year, 106 days	N/A
	K.S. Himmatsinhji	N/A	26 January 1950	1 July 1954	4 years, 156 days	N/A

In 1954, Bilaspur, another part-C State, was merged with Himachal Pradesh.

Chief ministers of Himachal Pradesh
No (Note: A number inside brackets indicates that the incumbent has previously held office.)	Portrait	Name	Constituency	Term of office			Assembly (election)	Party (Note: This column only names the chief minister's party. The state government he headed may have been a complex coalition of several parties and independents; these are not listed here.)
No	Portrait	Name	Constituency	From	To	Days in office	Assembly (election)	Party
Part 'C' State of Himachal Pradesh (1951–56)
1		Yashwant Singh Parmar	Pachhad	8 March 1952	31 October 1956	4 years, 237 days	Legislative Assembly (1952 election)	Indian National Congress
Office abolished, 1956–63 (Note: In 1956 Himachal Pradesh was made a Union Territory and was placed under a lieutenant governor with a Territorial Council with limited powers.)
Union territory of Himachal Pradesh (1963–71) (Note: In 1963, Himachal Pradesh though being a Union Territory was provided with a Legislative Assembly. The Territorial Council was converted into the Legislative Assembly of the Union Territory. The assembly has its first sitting on 1 October 1971.)
(1)		Yashwant Singh Parmar	Shri Renukaji	1 July 1963	4 March 1967	7 years, 208 days	1st (Territorial Council)	Indian National Congress
(1)		Yashwant Singh Parmar	Shri Renukaji	4 March 1967	25 January 1971	7 years, 208 days	2nd (1967)	Indian National Congress
State of Himachal Pradesh (1971–present) (Note: On 18 December 1970, the State of Himachal Pradesh Act was passed by Parliament and the new state came into being on 25 January 1971. Thus Himachal Pradesh emerged as the 18th state of Indian Union.)
(1)		Yashwant Singh Parmar	Shri Renukaji	25 January 1971	10 March 1972	6 years, 3 days	2nd (1967)	Indian National Congress
(1)		Yashwant Singh Parmar	Shri Renukaji	10 March 1972	28 January 1977	6 years, 3 days	3rd (1972)	Indian National Congress
2		Thakur Ram Lal	Jubbal-Kotkhai	28 January 1977	30 April 1977	92 days	3rd (1972)	Indian National Congress
–	State Emblem of India	Vacant (Note: President's rule may be imposed when the "government in a state is not able to function as per the Constitution", which often happens because no party or coalition has a majority in the assembly. When President's rule is in force in a state, its council of ministers stands dissolved. The office of chief minister thus lies vacant, and the administration is taken over by the governor, who functions on behalf of the central government. At times, the legislative assembly also stands dissolved.) (President's rule)	N/A	30 April 1977	22 June 1977	53 days	Dissolved	N/A
3		Shanta Kumar	Sullah	22 June 1977	14 February 1980	2 years, 237 days	4th (1977)	Janata Party
(2)		Thakur Ram Lal	Jubbal-Kotkhai	14 February 1980	15 June 1982	3 years, 53 days	4th (1977)	Indian National Congress
(2)		Thakur Ram Lal	Jubbal-Kotkhai	15 June 1982	8 April 1983	3 years, 53 days	5th (1982)	Indian National Congress
4		Virbhadra Singh	Jubbal-Kotkhai	8 April 1983	8 March 1985	6 years, 331 days	5th (1982)	Indian National Congress
4		Virbhadra Singh	Jubbal-Kotkhai	8 March 1985	5 March 1990	6 years, 331 days	6th (1985)	Indian National Congress
(3)		Shanta Kumar	Palampur	5 March 1990	15 December 1992	2 years, 285 days	7th (1990)	Bharatiya Janata Party
–	State Emblem of India	Vacant (President's rule)	N/A	15 December 1992	3 December 1993	353 days	Dissolved	N/A
(4)		Virbhadra Singh	Rohru	3 December 1993	24 March 1998	4 years, 111 days	8th (1993)	Indian National Congress
5		Prem Kumar Dhumal	Bamsan	24 March 1998	6 March 2003	4 years, 347 days	9th (1998)	Bharatiya Janata Party
(4)		Virbhadra Singh	Rohru	6 March 2003	30 December 2007	4 years, 299 days	10th (2003)	Indian National Congress
(5)		Prem Kumar Dhumal	Bamsan	30 December 2007	25 December 2012	4 years, 361 days	11th (2007)	Bharatiya Janata Party
(4)		Virbhadra Singh	Shimla Rural	25 December 2012	27 December 2017	5 years, 2 days	12th (2012)	Indian National Congress
6		Jai Ram Thakur	Seraj	27 December 2017	11 December 2022	4 years, 349 days	13th (2017)	Bharatiya Janata Party
7		Sukhvinder Singh Sukhu	Nadaun	11 December 2022	Incumbent	3 years, 338 days	14th (2022)	Indian National Congress

== List of Leaders of Opposition ==
No	Portrait	Name	Constituency	Tenure			Assembly	Chief Minister	Party
1		Dina Nath		1 July 1963	11 January 1967	3 years, 194 days	1st	Yashwant Singh Parmar	Swatantra Party
2		Kanwar Durga Chand	Sullah	18 March 1967	1 March 1972	4 years, 349 days	2nd	Yashwant Singh Parmar	Bharatiya Jana Sangh
3		Shanta Kumar	Khera	27 March 1972	30 March 1977	5 years, 3 days	3rd	Yashwant Singh Parmar; Thakur Ram Lal	Bharatiya Jana Sangh
4		Thakur Ram Lal	Jubbal-Kotkhai	29 June 1977	13 February 1980	2 years, 229 days	4th	Shanta Kumar	Indian National Congress
5		Jagdev Chand	Hamirpur	11 March 1985	3 March 1990	4 years, 357 days	6th	Virbhadra Singh	Bharatiya Janata Party
6		Vidya Stokes	Theog	21 March 1990	15 December 1992	2 years, 269 days	7th	Shanta Kumar	Indian National Congress
7		Jagat Prakash Nadda	Bilaspur	1 December 1993	24 December 1997	4 years, 23 days	8th	Virbhadra Singh	Bharatiya Janata Party
8		Virbhadra Singh	Rohru	25 March 1998	4 March 2003	4 years, 344 days	9th	Prem Kumar Dhumal	Indian National Congress
9		Prem Kumar Dhumal	Bamsan				10th	Virbhadra Singh	Bharatiya Janata Party
(6)		Vidya Stokes	Kumarsain	22 January 2008	25 December 2012	4 years, 338 days	11th	Prem Kumar Dhumal	Indian National Congress
(9)		Prem Kumar Dhumal	Hamirpur	2 January 2013	18 December 2017	4 years, 350 days	12th	Virbhadra Singh	Bharatiya Janata Party
10		Mukesh Agnihotri	Haroli	5 January 2018	11 December 2022	4 years, 340 days	13th	Jai Ram Thakur	Indian National Congress
11		Jai Ram Thakur	Seraj	25 December 2022	Incumbent	3 years, 324 days	14th	Sukhvinder Singh Sukhu	Bharatiya Janata Party

== See also ==
- Himachal Pradesh's Government
- 13th Legislative Assembly of Himachal Pradesh
