= Rajinder Rana =

Indian politician

Member of the Himachal Pradesh Legislative Assembly
- In office 18 December 2017 – 28 February 2024
- Preceded by: Narinder Thakur
- Constituency: Sujanpur
- In office 25 December 2012 – 16 May 2014
- Preceded by: constituency established
- Succeeded by: Narinder Thakur
- Constituency: Sujanpur

Personal details
- Born: 6 April 1966 (age 60) Baloh, Himachal Pradesh, India
- Party: Bharatiya Janata Party (2024–present)
- Other political affiliations: Indian National Congress (until 2024)
- Spouse: Anita Rana
- Children: Abhishek Rana, Tejeshwani Rana

Rajinder Rana (born 6 April 1966) is an Indian politician representing the Bhartiya Janata Party. He is a former member of the 13th Himachal Pradesh Legislative Assembly, representing the Sujanpur assembly constituency of Himachal Pradesh.

== Early life and education ==
Rajinder Rana, born on 6 April 1966 in Garoudumehale, PO Patlander, District Hamirpur, is a respected businessman and politician. He is the son of Smt. Roshni Devi and Shri Sukh Ram. Rajinder Rana is a graduate and is married to Smt. Anita Rana. The couple has one son and one daughter.

== Social Service ==
Rajinder Rana has made significant contributions to social service as the Founder Chairman of Sarv Kalyankari Sanstha (Registered).

== Political career ==
His political journey includes various roles and responsibilities:

- Media Incharge and Spokesperson, State BJP, from 2006 to 2012
- Chairman, H.P. State Media Advisory Committee, from 2008 to 2009

Rajinder Rana was first elected to the State Legislative Assembly in December 2012 and subsequently re-elected in December 2017. During his tenure, he served as a member of the Estimates and Business Advisory Committees from January 2013 to May 2014. He also held the position of Vice Chairman of the H.P. State Disaster Management Authority from 2014 to 2017. In the following years, he continued to contribute as a member of the Estimates and Subordinate Legislation Committees (2018-2022) and the Member Amenities Committee (2018-2022).

In December 2022, Rajinder Rana was elected to the State Legislative Assembly for the third term. He was nominated as the Chairman of the Public Undertakings Committee and is also a member of the Public Administration and Member Amenities Committees.

== Special interests ==
Rajinder Rana has a special interest in social service, reflecting his commitment to community welfare.

== Languages known ==
He is fluent in Hindi and English.
