= Chief Minister of Himachal Pradesh =

Leader of the executive branch of Government of Himachal Pradesh

- Emblem of Himachal Pradesh

- Flag of India

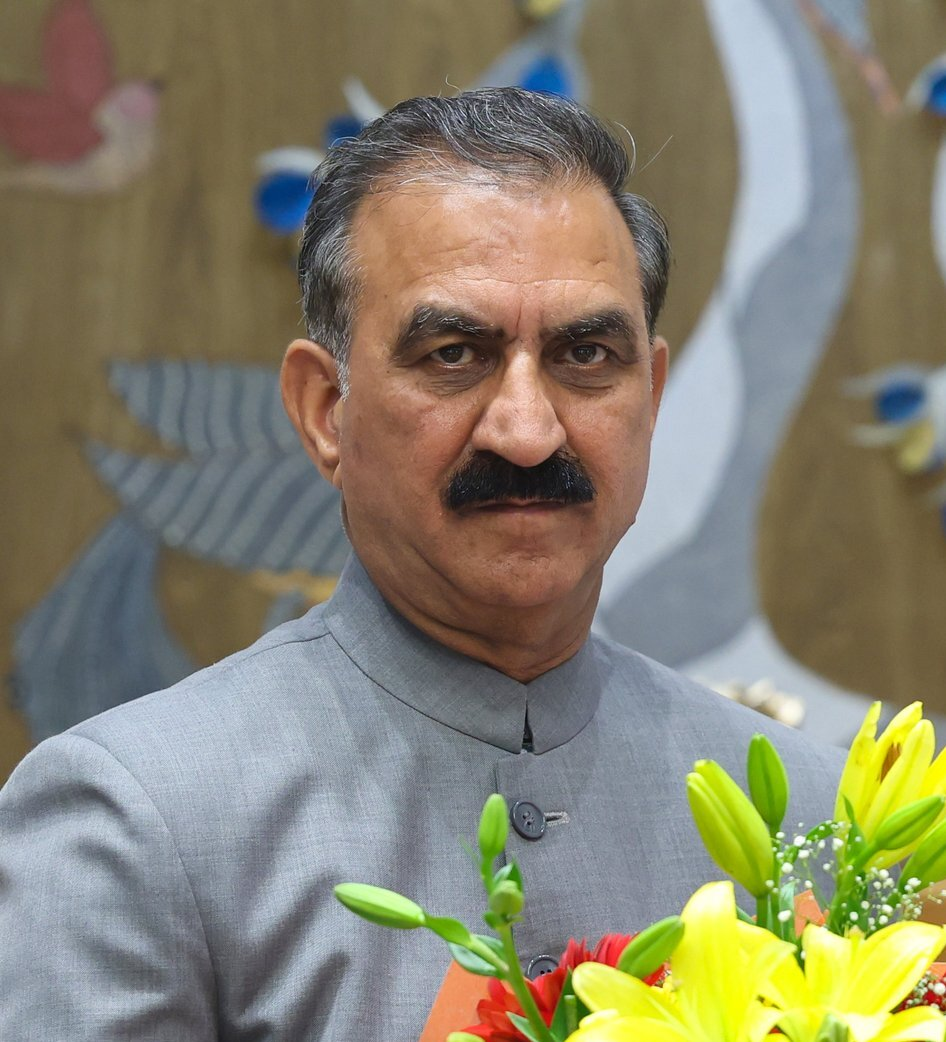
- Incumbent; Sukhvinder Singh Sukhu since 11 December 2022
- Chief Minister's Office; Government of Himachal Pradesh
- Style: The Honourable (formal); Mr. Chief Minister (informal)
- Type: Head of government
- Status: Leader of the Executive
- Abbreviation: CMoHP
- Member of: State Cabinet; Legislative Assembly
- Reports to: Governor of Himachal Pradesh; Himachal Pradesh Legislative Assembly
- Residence: Oakover, Shimla
- Seat: State Secretariat, Shimla
- Appointer: Governor of Himachal Pradesh; by convention based on appointees ability to command confidence in the Himachal Pradesh Legislative Assembly
- Term length: At the confidence of the assembly; Chief minister's term is for five years and is subject to no term limits.
- Inaugural holder: Yashwant Singh Parmar
- Formation: March 1952
- Deputy: Deputy Chief Minister of Himachal Pradesh
- Salary: ₹310,000 (US$3,200)/monthly; ₹3,720,000 (US$39,000)/annually
- Website: Official website

The chief minister of Himachal Pradesh is the chief executive of the Indian state of Himachal Pradesh. As per the Constitution of India, the governor is a state's de jure head, but de facto executive authority rests with the chief minister. Following elections to the Himachal Pradesh Legislative Assembly, the state's governor usually invites the party (or coalition) with a majority of seats to form the government. The governor appoints the chief minister, whose council of ministers are collectively responsible to the assembly. Given that he has the confidence of the assembly, the chief minister's term is for five years and is subject to no term limits. Chief Minister also serves as Leader of the House in the Legislative Assembly.

Since 1952, seven people have been chief minister of Himachal Pradesh. Four of these belonged to the Indian National Congress party, including inaugural office-holder Yashwant Singh Parmar. After his first term ended in 1956, Himachal Pradesh was made a union territory, and the office of chief minister ceased to exist. In 1963, Parmar once again became chief minister, and during his reign, in 1971, Himachal regained full statehood. Until March 2015, when he was surpassed by Virbhadra Singh, Parmar was the state's longest-serving chief minister. Between 1993 and 2017, the chief ministership changed hands every five years between Virbhadra Singh of the Congress and Prem Kumar Dhumal of the Bharatiya Janata Party. All chief ministers, except Shanta Kumar, have been from the Rajput caste.

== Oath as the state chief minister ==
The chief minister serves five years in the office. The following is the oath of the chief minister of state:

I, <Name of Chief Minister>, do swear in the name of God/solemnly affirm that I will bear true faith and allegiance to the Constitution of India as by law established, that I will uphold the sovereignty and integrity of India, that I will faithfully and conscientiously discharge my duties as a Minister for the State of () and that I will do right to all manner of people in accordance with the Constitution and the law without fear or favour, affection or ill-will.

Oath of Secrecy

"I, [Name], do swear in the name of God / solemnly affirm that I will not directly or indirectly communicate or reveal to any person or persons any matter which shall be brought under my consideration or shall become known to me as a Minister for the State of [Name of State] except as may be required for the due discharge of my duties as such Minister."Pad ki Shapath (Oath of Office) "Main, [CM ka Naam], Ishwar ki shapath leta hoon / satyanishtha se pratigyan karta hoon ki main vidhi dwara sthapit Bharat ke Samvidhan ke prati sachi shraddha aur nishtha rakhunga. Main Bharat ki prabhuta aur akhandta akshunn rakhunga. Main [State ka Naam] ke Rajya ke Mukhya Mantri ke roop mein apne kartavyon ka shraddhapoorvak aur shuddh antahkaran se nirvahan karunga, tatha main bhay ya pakshpat, anurag ya dwesh ke bina, sabhi prakar ke logon ke prati Samvidhan aur vidhi ke anusar nyay karunga." B. Gopniyata ki Shapath (Oath of Secrecy) "Main, [CM ka Naam], Ishwar ki shapath leta hoon / satyanishtha se pratigyan karta hoon ki jo vishay [State ka Naam] ke Rajya ke Mukhya Mantri ke roop mein mere vichar ke liye laya jayega athva mujhe gyaat hoga, use kisi vyakti ya vyaktityon ko, tab ke sivay jab ki aise Mukhya Mantri ke roop mein apne kartavyon ke uchit nirvahan ke liye aisa karna apekshit ho, main pratyaksh (directly) ya apratyaksh (indirectly) roop mein sansuchit ya prakat nahi karunga."

== Chief ministers of Himachal Pradesh (1952–56) and (1963–present) ==
The Chief Commissioner's Province of Himachal Pradesh was formed on 15 April 1948 through the integration of 30 erstwhile princely-states. In 1951, Himachal Pradejsh become a Part C state, under the Government of Part C State, 1951 and was brought under a lieutenant governor with 36-member Legislative Assembly. First elections to the Assembly were held in 1952. The Indian National Congress won 24 seats to form a government under Yashwant Singh Parmar.

Chief ministers of Bilaspur State (1950–1954)
Portrait	Name	Constituency	Term of office			Assembly
	Anand Chand	N/A	12 October 1948	26 January 1950	1 year, 106 days	N/A
	K.S. Himmatsinhji	N/A	26 January 1950	1 July 1954	4 years, 156 days	N/A

In 1954, Bilaspur, another part-C State, was merged with Himachal Pradesh.

Chief ministers of Himachal Pradesh
No (Note: A number inside brackets indicates that the incumbent has previously held office.)	Portrait	Name	Constituency	Term of office			Assembly (election)	Party (Note: This column only names the chief minister's party. The state government he headed may have been a complex coalition of several parties and independents; these are not listed here.)
No	Portrait	Name	Constituency	From	To	Days in office	Assembly (election)	Party
Part 'C' State of Himachal Pradesh (1951–56)
1		Yashwant Singh Parmar	Pachhad	8 March 1952	31 October 1956	4 years, 237 days	Legislative Assembly (1952 election)	Indian National Congress
Office abolished, 1956–63 (Note: In 1956 Himachal Pradesh was made a Union Territory and was placed under a lieutenant governor with a Territorial Council with limited powers.)
Union territory of Himachal Pradesh (1963–71) (Note: In 1963, Himachal Pradesh though being a Union Territory was provided with a Legislative Assembly. The Territorial Council was converted into the Legislative Assembly of the Union Territory. The assembly has its first sitting on 1 October 1971.)
(1)		Yashwant Singh Parmar	Shri Renukaji	1 July 1963	4 March 1967	7 years, 208 days	1st (Territorial Council)	Indian National Congress
(1)		Yashwant Singh Parmar	Shri Renukaji	4 March 1967	25 January 1971	7 years, 208 days	2nd (1967)	Indian National Congress
State of Himachal Pradesh (1971–present) (Note: On 18 December 1970, the State of Himachal Pradesh Act was passed by Parliament and the new state came into being on 25 January 1971. Thus Himachal Pradesh emerged as the 18th state of Indian Union.)
(1)		Yashwant Singh Parmar	Shri Renukaji	25 January 1971	10 March 1972	6 years, 3 days	2nd (1967)	Indian National Congress
(1)		Yashwant Singh Parmar	Shri Renukaji	10 March 1972	28 January 1977	6 years, 3 days	3rd (1972)	Indian National Congress
2		Thakur Ram Lal	Jubbal-Kotkhai	28 January 1977	30 April 1977	92 days	3rd (1972)	Indian National Congress
–	State Emblem of India	Vacant (Note: President's rule may be imposed when the "government in a state is not able to function as per the Constitution", which often happens because no party or coalition has a majority in the assembly. When President's rule is in force in a state, its council of ministers stands dissolved. The office of chief minister thus lies vacant, and the administration is taken over by the governor, who functions on behalf of the central government. At times, the legislative assembly also stands dissolved.) (President's rule)	N/A	30 April 1977	22 June 1977	53 days	Dissolved	N/A
3		Shanta Kumar	Sullah	22 June 1977	14 February 1980	2 years, 237 days	4th (1977)	Janata Party
(2)		Thakur Ram Lal	Jubbal-Kotkhai	14 February 1980	15 June 1982	3 years, 53 days	4th (1977)	Indian National Congress
(2)		Thakur Ram Lal	Jubbal-Kotkhai	15 June 1982	8 April 1983	3 years, 53 days	5th (1982)	Indian National Congress
4		Virbhadra Singh	Jubbal-Kotkhai	8 April 1983	8 March 1985	6 years, 331 days	5th (1982)	Indian National Congress
4		Virbhadra Singh	Jubbal-Kotkhai	8 March 1985	5 March 1990	6 years, 331 days	6th (1985)	Indian National Congress
(3)		Shanta Kumar	Palampur	5 March 1990	15 December 1992	2 years, 285 days	7th (1990)	Bharatiya Janata Party
–	State Emblem of India	Vacant (President's rule)	N/A	15 December 1992	3 December 1993	353 days	Dissolved	N/A
(4)		Virbhadra Singh	Rohru	3 December 1993	24 March 1998	4 years, 111 days	8th (1993)	Indian National Congress
5		Prem Kumar Dhumal	Bamsan	24 March 1998	6 March 2003	4 years, 347 days	9th (1998)	Bharatiya Janata Party
(4)		Virbhadra Singh	Rohru	6 March 2003	30 December 2007	4 years, 299 days	10th (2003)	Indian National Congress
(5)		Prem Kumar Dhumal	Bamsan	30 December 2007	25 December 2012	4 years, 361 days	11th (2007)	Bharatiya Janata Party
(4)		Virbhadra Singh	Shimla Rural	25 December 2012	27 December 2017	5 years, 2 days	12th (2012)	Indian National Congress
6		Jai Ram Thakur	Seraj	27 December 2017	11 December 2022	4 years, 349 days	13th (2017)	Bharatiya Janata Party
7		Sukhvinder Singh Sukhu	Nadaun	11 December 2022	Incumbent	3 years, 304 days	14th (2022)	Indian National Congress

== Statistics ==
=== Statistics for chief ministers of Himachal Pradesh ===
Fraction of time of holding CMO by party (as of 26 August 2026)
1. Indian National Congress (68.4%)
2. Bharatiya Janata Party (26.2%)
3. Janata Party (3.93%)
4. President's Rule (1.43%)

#	Chief Minister	Party	Term of office	
#	Chief Minister	Party	Longest tenure	Total tenure
1	Virbhadra Singh	INC	6 years, 331 days	21 years, 13 days
2	Yashwant Singh Parmar	INC	6 years, 3 days	18 years, 83 days
3	Prem Kumar Dhumal	BJP	4 years, 361 days	9 years, 343 days
4	Shanta Kumar	JP/BJP	2 years, 285 days	5 years, 157 days
5	Jai Ram Thakur	BJP	4 years, 349 days	4 years, 349 days
6	Sukhvinder Singh Sukhu	INC	3 years, 304 days	3 years, 304 days
7	Thakur Ram Lal	INC	3 years, 53 days	3 years, 145 days

== Notes ==
Footnotes
