= Bamsan Assembly constituency =

Former Legislative Assembly constituency in Himachal Pradesh, India

Coordinates: 31.80°N 76.50°E

Bamsan
- Former constituency for the Himachal Pradesh Legislative Assembly

Constituency details
- Country: India
- Region: North India
- State: Himachal Pradesh
- District: Hamirpur
- Lok Sabha constituency: Hamirpur
- Established: 1972
- Abolished: 2012
- Reservation: None

Bamsan was one of the 68 constituencies in the Himachal Pradesh Legislative Assembly of Himachal Pradesh a northern state of India. It was also part of Hamirpur, Himachal Pradesh Lok Sabha constituency.

== Members of Legislative Assembly ==
Year	Member	Picture	Party
1972	Chandresh Kumari		Indian National Congress
1977	Ranjit Singh Verma		Janata Party
1982	Lashkari Ram		Bharatiya Janata Party
1985	Karam Singh		Indian National Congress
1990	Lashkari Ram		Bharatiya Janata Party
1993	Kuldeep Singh Pathania		Indian National Congress
1998	Prem Kumar Dhumal		Bharatiya Janata Party
2003	Prem Kumar Dhumal		Bharatiya Janata Party
2007	Prem Kumar Dhumal		Bharatiya Janata Party

== Election results ==
=== Assembly Election 2007 ===
2007 Himachal Pradesh Legislative Assembly election: Bamsan
Party	Candidate	Votes	%	±%
BJP	Prem Kumar Dhumal	35,054	76.14%	▲9.41
INC	Col. Bidhi Chand	9,047	19.65%	▼11.36
BSP	Surinder Kumar	1,474	3.20%	▲2.17
LJP	Rajkumar Dhaloch	400	0.87%	New
Margin of victory		26,007	56.49%	▲20.77
Turnout		46,038	66.82%	▼7.63
Registered electors		68,894		▲16.73
BJP hold		Swing	▲9.41	

=== Assembly Election 2003 ===
2003 Himachal Pradesh Legislative Assembly election: Bamsan
Party	Candidate	Votes	%	±%
BJP	Prem Kumar Dhumal	29,325	66.73%	▲6.39
INC	Kuldeep Singh Pathania	13,627	31.01%	▼3.62
Independent	Piar Chand Jasrotia	537	1.22%	New
BSP	Gopi Chand Attari	455	1.04%	▲0.14
Margin of victory		15,698	35.72%	▲10.01
Turnout		43,944	74.48%	▲3.53
Registered electors		59,018		▲21.94
BJP hold		Swing	▲6.39	

=== Assembly Election 1998 ===
1998 Himachal Pradesh Legislative Assembly election: Bamsan
Party	Candidate	Votes	%	±%
BJP	Prem Kumar Dhumal	20,715	60.34%	▲14.83
INC	Kuldeep Singh Pathania	11,887	34.63%	▼11.61
HVC	Ranjit Singh Verma	1,329	3.87%	New
BSP	Lachho Ram	309	0.90%	▼0.27
Margin of victory		8,828	25.72%	▲24.99
Turnout		34,329	71.63%	▲8.34
Registered electors		48,398		▲2.56
BJP gain from INC		Swing	▲14.10	

=== Assembly Election 1993 ===
1993 Himachal Pradesh Legislative Assembly election: Bamsan
Party	Candidate	Votes	%	±%
INC	Kuldeep Singh Pathania	13,657	46.24%	▲21.08
BJP	Lashkari Ram	13,442	45.51%	▼12.53
Independent	Nambardar Balbir Singh	796	2.70%	New
Independent	Bhagat Ram	681	2.31%	New
BSP	Lachho Ram	345	1.17%	New
Margin of victory		215	0.73%	▼32.15
Turnout		29,534	63.05%	▼1.01
Registered electors		47,188		▲5.89
INC gain from BJP		Swing	▼11.80	

=== Assembly Election 1990 ===
1990 Himachal Pradesh Legislative Assembly election: Bamsan
Party	Candidate	Votes	%	±%
BJP	Lashkari Ram	16,450	58.05%	▲14.79
INC	Karam Singh	7,131	25.16%	▼29.85
INS(SCS)	Ranjit Singh Verma	4,295	15.16%	New
Independent	Roshan Lal	156	0.55%	New
Margin of victory		9,319	32.88%	▲21.12
Turnout		28,340	64.34%	▼2.50
Registered electors		44,563		▲29.49
BJP gain from INC		Swing	▲3.03	

=== Assembly Election 1985 ===
1985 Himachal Pradesh Legislative Assembly election: Bamsan
Party	Candidate	Votes	%	±%
INC	Karam Singh	12,513	55.02%	▲12.66
BJP	Pirthi Singh	9,837	43.25%	▼12.41
CPI(M)	Bhandari Ram Golohda	199	0.87%	New
Independent	Lachho Ram	124	0.55%	New
Margin of victory		2,676	11.77%	▼1.54
Turnout		22,744	66.44%	▼5.72
Registered electors		34,413		▲6.95
INC gain from BJP		Swing	▼0.65	

=== Assembly Election 1982 ===
1982 Himachal Pradesh Legislative Assembly election: Bamsan
Party	Candidate	Votes	%	±%
BJP	Lashkari Ram	12,862	55.66%	New
INC	Ranjit Singh	9,788	42.36%	▲13.09
Independent	Salig Ram	238	1.03%	New
Margin of victory		3,074	13.30%	▼2.03
Turnout		23,107	72.94%	▲14.95
Registered electors		32,177		▲7.07
BJP gain from JP		Swing		

=== Assembly Election 1977 ===
1977 Himachal Pradesh Legislative Assembly election: Bamsan
Party	Candidate	Votes	%	±%
JP	Ranjit Singh Verma	7,623	44.61%	New
INC	Bhumi Dev	5,002	29.27%	▼17.09
Independent	Karam Singh	4,105	24.02%	New
Independent	Som Nath Sharma	161	0.94%	New
Independent	Gian Chand	101	0.59%	New
Independent	Sita Ram	98	0.57%	New
Margin of victory		2,621	15.34%	▲3.17
Turnout		17,090	57.84%	▼0.04
Registered electors		30,053		▲32.90
JP gain from INC		Swing	▼1.75	

=== Assembly Election 1972 ===
1972 Himachal Pradesh Legislative Assembly election: Bamsan
Party	Candidate	Votes	%	±%
INC	Chandresh Kumari Katoch	5,965	46.36%	New
Independent	Bhumi Dev	4,399	34.19%	New
Independent	Karam Singh	2,335	18.15%	New
Independent	Sita Ram	169	1.31%	New
Margin of victory		1,566	12.17%	
Turnout		12,868	58.91%	
Registered electors		22,614		
INC win (new seat)				

== See also ==
- Hamirpur district, Himachal Pradesh
- List of constituencies of Himachal Pradesh Legislative Assembly
