= 1998 Himachal Pradesh Legislative Assembly election =

Indian state legislative election

- 28 February and 3 June 1998

All 68 seats in the Himachal Pradesh Legislative Assembly 35 seats needed for a majority
- Registered: 3,628,864
- Turnout: 71.23%
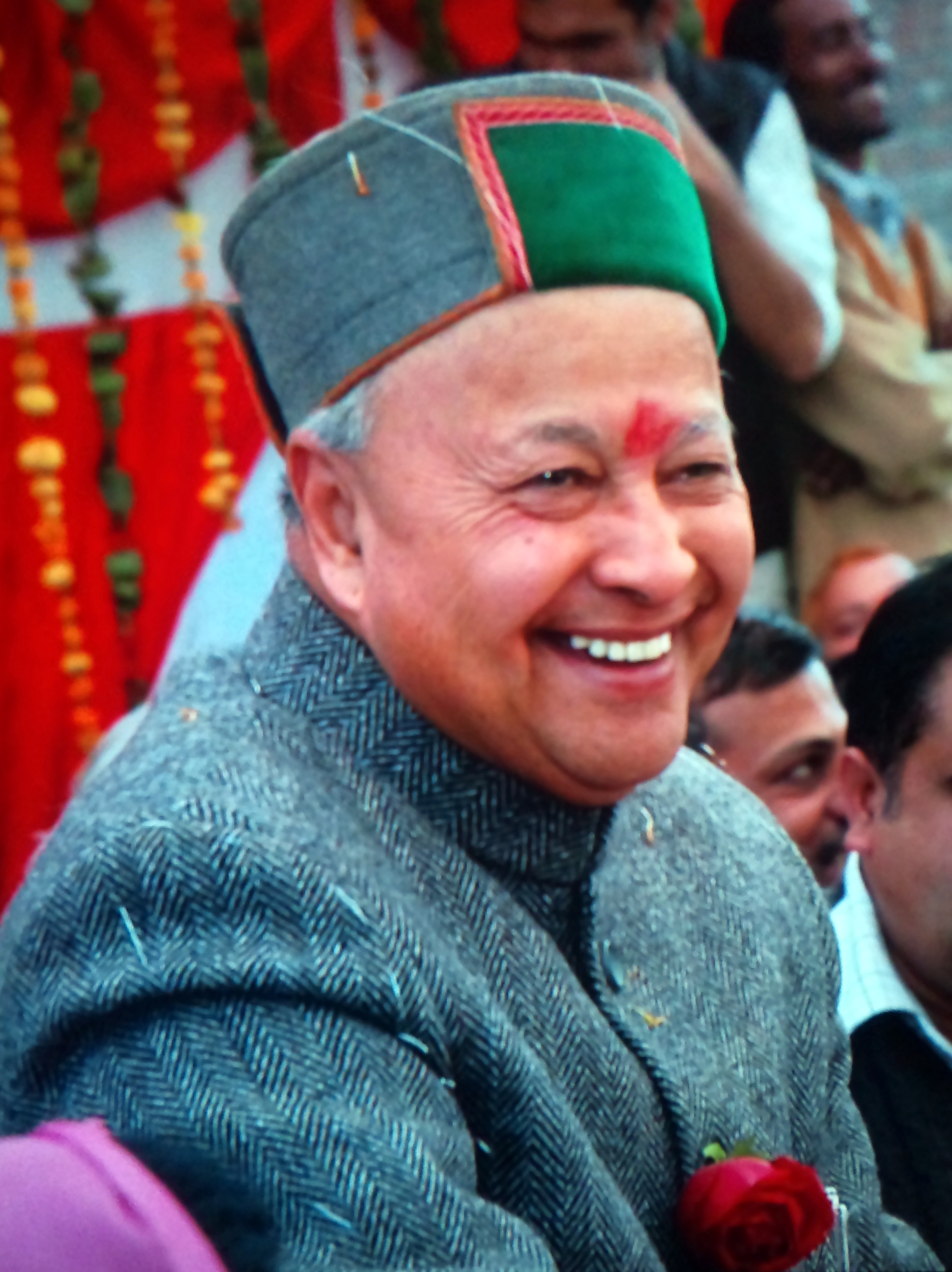

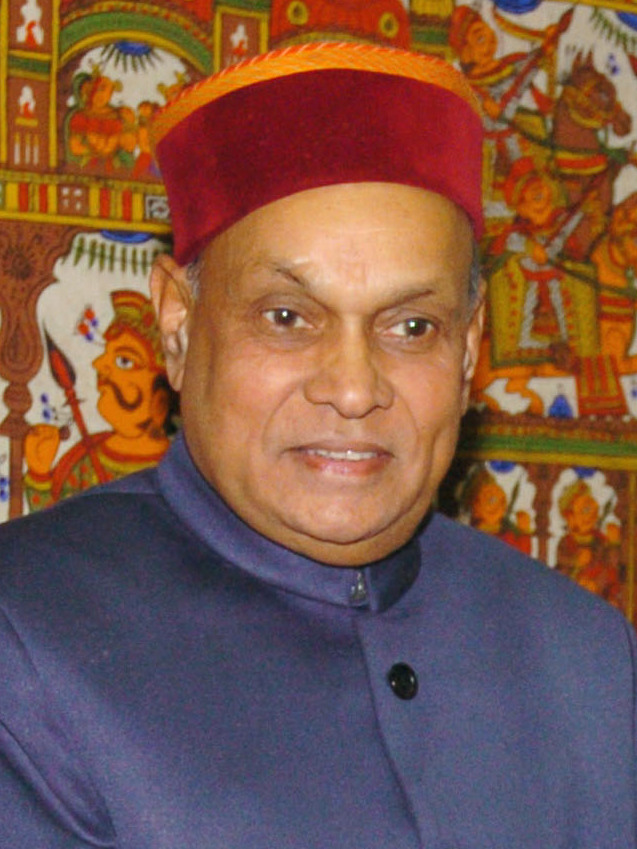
	Majority party	Minority party
Leader	Virbhadra Singh	Prem Kumar Dhumal
Party	INC	BJP
Seats before	52	8
Seats won	31	31
Seat change	▼21	▲23
Popular vote	1,110,055	995,482
Percentage	43.51%	39.02%
Swing	▼5.31%	▲2.88%
CM before election
Virbhadra Singh
INC
Elected CM
Prem Kumar Dhumal
BJP

Elections to the Himachal Pradesh Legislative Assembly were held in 1998 to elect members of the 68 constituencies in Himachal Pradesh, India. The Indian National Congress and the Bharatiya Janata Party won an equal number of seats, but the BJP managed to form the government by allying with the Himachal Vikas Congress, and Prem Kumar Dhumal was appointed as the Chief Minister of Himachal Pradesh. The number of constituencies was set as 68 by the recommendation of the Delimitation Commission of India.

== Parties and alliances ==
=== National Democratic Alliance ===
Party	Flag	Symbol	Leader	Contesting Seats
Bharatiya Janata Party			Prem Kumar Dhumal	68

=== Indian National Congress ===
Party	Flag	Symbol	Leader	Contesting Seats
Indian National Congress			Virbhadra Singh	68

=== Others ===
Party	flag	Symbol	Leader	Contesting Seats
Himachal Vikas Congress			Anil Sharma	62

== Result ==
Party	Votes	%	Seats	+/–
Indian National Congress	1,110,055	43.50	31	▼21
Bharatiya Janata Party	995,482	39.01	31	▲23
Himachal Vikas Congress	245,584	9.62	5	New
Others	93,693	3.67	0	0
Independents	106,764	4.18	1	▼6
Total	2,551,578	100.00	68	0
Valid votes	2,551,578	98.72		
Invalid/blank votes	33,206	1.28		
Total votes	2,584,784	100.00		
Registered voters/turnout	3,628,864	71.23		
Source: ECI

== Elected members ==
Constituency	Reserved for (SC/ST/None)	Member	Party	Vote	Runner-up Candidates Name	Party	vote
Kinnaur	ST	Chet Ram Negi	Bharatiya Janata Party	16667	Jagat Singh Negi	Indian National Congress	13347
Rampur	SC	Singhi Ram	Indian National Congress	23338	Ninzoo Ram	Bharatiya Janata Party	8773
Rohru	None	Virbhadra Singh	Indian National Congress	33637	Khushi Ram	Bharatiya Janata Party	7489
Jubbal-kotkhai	None	Ram Lal	Indian National Congress	23762	Raj Pal	Janata Dal	5728
Chopal	None	Yogendra Chandar	Indian National Congress	18972	Kewal Rama Chauhan	Himachal Vikas Congress	6735
Kumarsain	None	Jai Bihari Lal Khachi	Indian National Congress	19492	Ghanshyam Dass	Independent	9917
Theog	None	Vidya Stokes	Indian National Congress	21926	Rakesh Varma	Bharatiya Janata Party	15844
Simla	None	Narinder Bragta	Bharatiya Janata Party	14758	Harbhajan Singh Bhajji	Indian National Congress	12155
Kasumpti	SC	Roop Dass Kashyap	Bharatiya Janata Party	19700	Shonkia Ram Kashyap	Indian National Congress	17786
Arki	None	Dharam Pal Thakur	Indian National Congress	14327	Nagin Chandra Pal	Bharatiya Janata Party	13749
Doon	None	Lajja Ram	Indian National Congress	16002	Vinod Kumari Chander	Independent	12854
Nalagarh	None	Hari Narayan Singh	Bharatiya Janata Party	23435	Vijayendra Singh	Indian National Congress	18105
Kasauli	SC	Raghu Raj	Indian National Congress	14113	Chaman Lall	Himachal Vikas Congress	8541
Solan	None	Krishna Mohini	Indian National Congress	12210	Mohinder Nath Sofat	Bharatiya Janata Party	12184
Pachhad	SC	Gangu Ram Musafir	Indian National Congress	24208	Kali Dass Kashyap	Bharatiya Janata Party	9832
Rainka	SC	Prem Singh	Indian National Congress	20590	Roop Singh	Bharatiya Janata Party	9352
Shillai	None	Harsh Wardhan	Indian National Congress	21234	Jagat Singh	Bharatiya Janata Party	11646
Paonta Doon	None	Rattan Singh	Indian National Congress	15569	Sukh Ram	Bharatiya Janata Party	13149
Nahan	None	Kush Parmar	Indian National Congress	14798	Shyama Sharma	Bharatiya Janata Party	11808
Kotkehloor	None	Ram Lal Thakur	Indian National Congress	20381	Krishan Kumar	Bharatiya Janata Party	17321
Bilaspur	None	Jagat Prakash Nadda	Bharatiya Janata Party	21189	Babu Ram Gautam	Indian National Congress	13140
Ghumarwin	None	Kashmir Singh	Indian National Congress	18066	Karam Dev	Bharatiya Janata Party	16527
Geharwin	SC	Rikhi Ram	Bharatiya Janata Party	18268	Beeru Ram	Indian National Congress	16682
Nadaun	None	Babu Ram Mandial	Bharatiya Janata Party	16917	Narain Chand Prashar	Indian National Congress	16337
Hamirpur	None	Urmila Thakur	Bharatiya Janata Party	20577	Anita Verma	Indian National Congress	16387
Bamsan	None	Prem Kumar Dhumal	Bharatiya Janata Party	20715	Kuldeep Singh Pathania	Indian National Congress	11887
Mewa	SC	Ishwar Dass Dhiman	Bharatiya Janata Party	19949	Prem Kaushal	Indian National Congress	14532
Nadaunta	None	Baldev Sharma	Bharatiya Janata Party	20706	Manjit Singh	Indian National Congress	16021
Gagret	SC	Kuldeep Kumar	Indian National Congress	17984	Satpaul	Bharatiya Janata Party	14480
Chintpurni	None	Parveen Sharma	Bharatiya Janata Party	12764	Hari Dutt	Indian National Congress	12111
Santokgarh	None	Jai Krishan Sharma	Bharatiya Janata Party	13136	Onkar Sharma	Indian National Congress	10825
Una	None	Virender Gautam	Indian National Congress	18201	Subhash Sahore	Bharatiya Janata Party	12427
Kutlehar	None	Ram Dass Malangar	Bharatiya Janata Party	11660	Mahendra Pal	Indian National Congress	11657
Nurpur	None	Rakesh Pathania	Bharatiya Janata Party	24516	Ranjeet Singh Bakshi	Indian National Congress	22110
Gangath	SC	Des Raj	Bharatiya Janata Party	18771	Bodh Raj	Indian National Congress	18623
Jawali	None	Rajan Sushant	Bharatiya Janata Party	24041	Sujan Singh	Indian National Congress	17014
Guler	None	Chander Kumar	Indian National Congress	18674	Harbans Singh Rana	Bharatiya Janata Party	13806
Jaswan	None	Viplove Thakur	Indian National Congress	14944	Bikram Singh	Bharatiya Janata Party	9081
Pragpur	SC	Virender Kumar	Bharatiya Janata Party	17513	Yog Raj	Indian National Congress	16241
Jawalamukhi	None	Ramesh Chand	Independent	11517	Kewal Singh	Indian National Congress	10456
Thural	None	Ravinder Singh Ravi	Bharatiya Janata Party	17132	Aishwarya Dev Chand	Indian National Congress	12262
Rajgir	SC	Atma Ram	Bharatiya Janata Party	13708	Milkhi Ram Goma	Indian National Congress	10276
Baijnath	None	Sant Ram	Indian National Congress	15684	Dulo Ram	Bharatiya Janata Party	14782
Palampur	None	Brij Behari Lal Butail	Indian National Congress	18450	Shiv Kumar	Bharatiya Janata Party	17658
Sulah	None	Bipan Singh Parmar	Bharatiya Janata Party	14690	Jagjiwan Paul	Indian National Congress	14565
Nagrota	None	G.s.bali	Indian National Congress	17538	Ram Chand Bhatia	Bharatiya Janata Party	16314
Shahpur	None	Sarveen Choudhary	Bharatiya Janata Party	20919	Major Vijai Singh Mankotia	Indian National Congress	18101
Dharamsala	None	Kishan Chand Kapoor	Bharatiya Janata Party	16522	Ram Swaroop	Indian National Congress	13167
Kangra	None	Vidya Sagar Chaudhary	Bharatiya Janata Party	21695	Daulat Chaudhary	Indian National Congress	14484
Bhattiyat	None	Kishori Lal	Bharatiya Janata Party	20387	Kuldip Singh Pathania	Indian National Congress	12578
Banikhet	None	Asha Kumari	Indian National Congress	22509	Renu Chadha	Bharatiya Janata Party	22088
Rajnagar	SC	Mohan Lal	Bharatiya Janata Party	16064	Vidya Dhar	Indian National Congress	12739
Chamba	None	Harsh Mahajan	Indian National Congress	19562	Kewal Krishan	Bharatiya Janata Party	14411
Bharmour	ST	Tulsi Ram	Bharatiya Janata Party	16068	Thakar Singh	Indian National Congress	12244
Lahaul And Spiti	ST	Ram Lal Markanda	Himachal Vikas Congress	5113	Raghubir Singh	Indian National Congress	4467
Kulu	None	Chander Sain Thakur	Bharatiya Janata Party	24467	Raj Krishan Gaur	Indian National Congress	24429
Banjar	None	Karan Singh	Bharatiya Janata Party	25696	Satya Prakash Thakur	Indian National Congress	22961
Ani	SC	Ishwar Dass	Indian National Congress	23780	Tej Ram	Bharatiya Janata Party	21310
Karsog	SC	Mansa Ram	Himachal Vikas Congress	13009	Joginder Pal	Bharatiya Janata Party	11077
Chachiot	None	Jai Ram Thakur	Bharatiya Janata Party	15337	Moti Ram	Indian National Congress	9558
Nachan	SC	Tek Chand	Indian National Congress	14390	Dile Ram	Bharatiya Janata Party	13631
Sundernagar	None	Roop Singh	Bharatiya Janata Party	13136	Sher Singh	Indian National Congress	12367
Balh	SC	Parkash	Himachal Vikas Congress	20594	Damodar Dass	Bharatiya Janata Party	13295
Gopalpur	None	Rangila Ram Rao	Indian National Congress	20574	Teg Singh	Himachal Vikas Congress	12532
Dharampur	None	Mahender Singh	Himachal Vikas Congress	14562	Natha Singh	Indian National Congress	13596
Joginder Nagar	None	Gulab Singh	Indian National Congress	13862	Ganga Ram Jamwal	Bharatiya Janata Party	12171
Darang	None	Kaul Sing	Indian National Congress	23616	Jawahar Lal	Himachal Vikas Congress	10598
Mandi	None	Sukh Ram	Himachal Vikas Congress	25656	Kanhaiya Lal	Bharatiya Janata Party	6667

== See also ==
- List of constituencies of the Himachal Pradesh Legislative Assembly
- 1998 elections in India
