= Hans Raj (politician) =

Indian politician

Deputy Speaker of the Himachal Pradesh Legislative Assembly
- In office 10 January 2018 – 12 December 2022
- Governor: Acharya Devvrat; Kalraj Mishra; Bandaru Dattatreya; Rajendra Arlekar
- Chief Minister: Jai Ram Thakur
- Preceded by: Jagat Singh Negi
- Succeeded by: Vinay Kumar

Member of the Himachal Pradesh Legislative Assembly
- Incumbent
- Assumed office 20 December 2012
- Preceded by: constituency established
- Constituency: Churah

Personal details
- Born: 24 April 1983 (age 42) Dhaiyas, Chamba district, Himachal Pradesh, India
- Party: Bharatiya Janata Party
- Spouse: Hameeru Devi
- Children: 1 Son & two daughters
- Parent: Nirmal (father)
- Education: B.A., B.Ed, M.A., M.Phil and Ph.D.
- Profession: Educationist

Hans Raj (born 24 April 1983 in Dhaiyas, Distt. Chamba) is a former deputy speaker of Himachal Pradesh Legislative Assembly and a leader of Bharatiya Janata Party. He was elected to the assembly from Churah in Chamba district. He was first elected to the assembly in 2012. Hans Raj has also been a subject of many controversies. On 20 August 2024, he was booked under a FIR where a daughter of a Bharatiya Janata Party functionary was harassed over WhatsApp and was asked to send obscene photos.

== Educational background ==
B.A., B.Ed, M.A., M.Phil and Ph.D.

== Family life ==
Raj is the son of Shri Nirmal. He married Smt. Hameeru Devi, and has one son and two daughters.

== Political and legislative career ==
Raj's political career began as a Member of Zila Parishad from 2011 to 2012. He was elected to the State Assembly in December 2012 and was re-elected in December 2017. During his tenure, he served as a member of the Welfare and Library & Member Amenities Committees from 2013 to 2017.

Raj served as the Deputy Speaker of the Himachal Pradesh Vidhan Sabha from 10 January 2018 to December 2022. Elected for the third consecutive term in December 2022, he has been nominated as a Member of the Welfare & Privileges Committees.

== Social activism ==
Beyond his political role, Raj engages in social activities, particularly working for the development of education, health, and the environment under the Pratham NGO.

== Favorite pastime ==
Raj's favorite pastime is cricket.

== Languages known ==
Raj is fluent in Hindi and English.

== Electoral performance ==
2022 Himachal Pradesh Legislative Assembly election: Churah
Party	Candidate	Votes	%	±%
BJP	Hans Raj	32,095	51.49%	▼0.90
INC	Yashwant Singh	29,453	47.26%	▲4.02
NOTA	Nota	394	0.63%	▼0.30
AAP	Nand Kumar Jaryal	385	0.62%	New
Margin of victory		2,642	4.24%	▼4.92
Turnout		62,327	79.07%	▲0.37
Registered electors		78,823		▲14.86
BJP hold		Swing	▼0.90	

2017 Himachal Pradesh Legislative Assembly election: Churah
Party	Candidate	Votes	%	±%
BJP	Hans Raj	28,293	52.39%	▲1.00
INC	Surender Bhardwaj	23,349	43.23%	▼3.61
NOTA	None of the Above	505	0.94%	New
SP	Nand Kumar	442	0.82%	New
Independent	Des Raj	425	0.79%	New
Margin of victory		4,944	9.15%	▲4.61
Turnout		54,005	78.70%	▼0.83
Registered electors		68,623		▲12.28
BJP hold		Swing	▲1.00	

2012 Himachal Pradesh Legislative Assembly election: Churah
Party	Candidate	Votes	%	±%
BJP	Hans Raj	24,978	51.39%	New
INC	Surender Bhardwaj	22,767	46.84%	▲15.36
BSP	Kishan Chand	799	1.64%	New
Margin of victory		2,211	4.55%	▼0.29
Turnout		48,606	79.53%	▲40.83
Registered electors		61,120		▲109.42
BJP gain from INC		Swing		
