= Prem Kumar Dhumal =

Indian politician

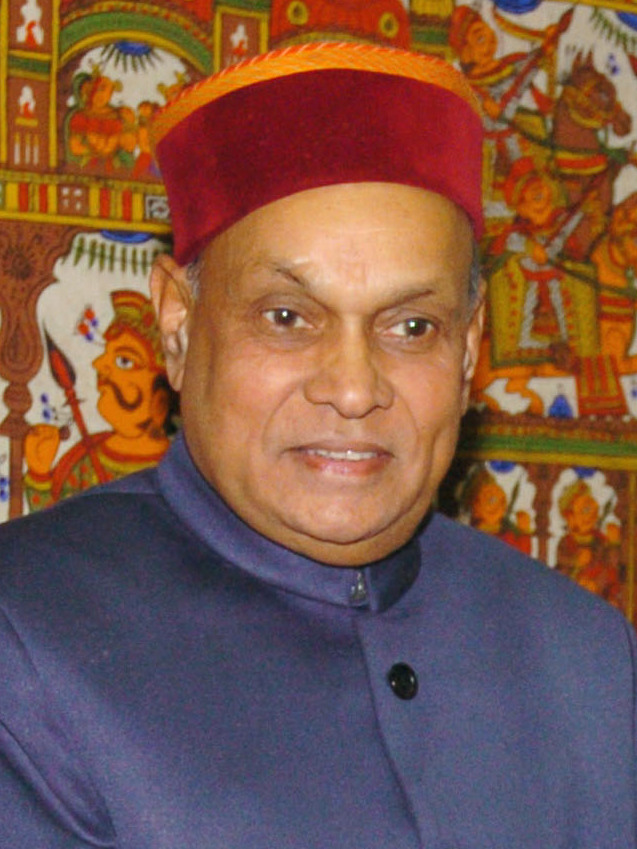
- Dhumal in 2008

5th Chief Minister of Himachal Pradesh
- In office 30 December 2007 – 25 December 2012
- Governor: Urmila Singh (from 2010); Prabha Rau (till 2010)
- Preceded by: Virbhadra Singh
- Succeeded by: Virbhadra Singh
- In office 24 March 1998 – 5 March 2003
- Governor: Suraj Bhan (2000–2003); Vishnu Kant Shastri (1999–2000); V. S. Ramadevi (1998–1999)
- Preceded by: Virbhadra Singh
- Succeeded by: Virbhadra Singh

Member of Parliament, Lok Sabha
- In office 2007–2008
- Preceded by: Suresh Chandel
- Succeeded by: Anurag Thakur
- Constituency: Hamirpur, Himachal Pradesh
- In office 1989–1996
- Preceded by: Narain Chand
- Succeeded by: Vikram Singh
- Constituency: Hamirpur, Himachal Pradesh

LOP in Himachal Assembly
- In office 2003-07
- In office 2 January 2013 18 December 2017

Personal details
- Born: 10 April 1944 (age 82) Samirpur, Punjab Province, British India (present-day Himachal Pradesh, India)
- Party: Bharatiya Janata Party
- Spouse: Sheela Dhumal (m. 1972)
- Children: Anurag Thakur , Arun Dhumal
- Education: M.A. in Doaba College, Jalandhar; LL.B. in Guru Nanak Dev University, Amritsar
- Occupation: Politician
- Profession: Teacher

Prem Kumar Dhumal (pronounced [preːmə kʊmaːrə d̪ʱuːmələ]; born 10 April 1944) is an Indian politician who has twice served as the Chief Minister of Himachal Pradesh, from March 1998 to March 2003 and again from 1 January 2008 to 25 December 2012. He was the Bharatiya Janata Party's Chief Ministerial candidate for the 2017 Himachal Assembly Election, in which he lost his seat.

As chief minister of Himachal, its phone tapping scandal took place, where phones of over 1100 civilians were illegally recorded, where permission was only taken for around 170 phones. BJP's Shanta Kumar also requested to disclose names of people whose phones were tapped during Dhumal's tenure. He was rivalled by Virbhadra Singh of Congress.

== Early life ==
Prem Kumar Dhumal was born on 10 April 1944 in Samirpur village, Hamirpur district. His father's name was Capt. Mahant Ram and mother Phulmu Devi. He has M.A. (Eng), and LL.B. degrees following his education at Doaba College in Jalandhar and Guru Nanak Dev University, Amritsar. He became a lecturer at a private college in Punjab.

Dhumal married Sheela on 23 May 1972, with whom he has two sons, Arun Singh Dhumal and Anurag Thakur. The latter is also a politician and has been a member of the 14th and 15th Lok Sabhas, as well as Minister of State in Finance but was elevated to the rank of Cabinet Minister for Minister of Sports and Youth Affairs and Minister of Information and Broadcasting in the July 2021.

== Political career ==
Dhumal became vice-president of the Bharatiya Janata Yuva Morcha in 1982. In 1984, he was selected as the candidate for the Hamirpur parliamentary constituency when the sitting Member of the Himachal Pradesh Legislative Assembly (MLA), and state stalwart Jagdev Chand, refused to stand. Dhumal lost that election but won in 1989 and 1991, and before losing the seat to Major General Bikram Singh in the 1996 Indian general election.

After the sudden death of Jagdev Chand in 1993, Dhumal became active in state politics. Dhumal was elected president of the Bharatiya Janata Party in Himachal Pradesh and became the state's Chief Minister following the March 1998 state assembly elections. He won the Bamsan constituency of the Himachal Pradesh Legislative Assembly with a margin of 18,000 votes.

He headed the BJP-Himachal Vikas Congress coalition government for its full statutory term of five years, from 1998 to 2003 and became Leader of the Opposition when the BJP lost power in the 2003 elections, winning only 16 seats despite support from the National Democratic Alliance (NDA) Union government.

His tenure as the chief minister saw significant infrastructure developments, particularly of roads, and gave rise to Dhumal being called the Sadak walla Chief Minister.

Dhumal resigned his seat in the Himachal Pradesh legislative assembly upon winning the Hamirpur constituency in a 2007 by-election for the Lok Sabha. The by-election came about because of the expulsion of Suresh Chandel, a BJP Member of Parliament who had been involved in a cash-for-questions scandal. A further by-election in May 2008 saw Dhumal replaced as MP by his son, Anurag Thakur.

Dhumal became Chief Minister of Himachal Pradesh for a second time after being sworn in on 30 December 2007 after the BJP won that year's assembly elections. The BJP lost power in the 2012 elections.

In the state assembly elections of 2017, Dhumal stood as a BJP candidate in the Sujanpur constituency and was the party's proposed candidate for the Chief Ministerial office. Even though the BJP gained majority in the elections, Dhumal lost to Rajinder Rana from the Indian National Congress, thwarting his chances to lead the government for the third time in Himachal Pradesh.

== Personal interests ==
He has written large number of articles which have been published in different leading newspapers on political, cultural, sports and other national issues from time to time and he was the general secretary of the Doaba College literary society and editor of college magazine. His social and cultural interests include helping the poor sections of the society in getting good education free of cost or at cheaper cost and helping the poorer sections of society in getting their daughters married. He has special interest in the field of rural development, employment generation, involvement of youth in constructive work and activities, development of tourism, Hydel power in the state, inspire agriculturists to switch over to horticulture, floriculture and heliculture so that they can increase their income. He has interest in reading and listening to good music in free time. He had also been captain of the college volleyball team for three consecutive years and played it up to his university level.

Preceded by Virbhadra Singh	Chief Minister of Himachal Pradesh; 30 December 2007 - December 2012	Succeeded by Virbhadra Singh
