= Hamirpur, Himachal Pradesh =

Town in Himachal Pradesh, India

Hamirpur
- City
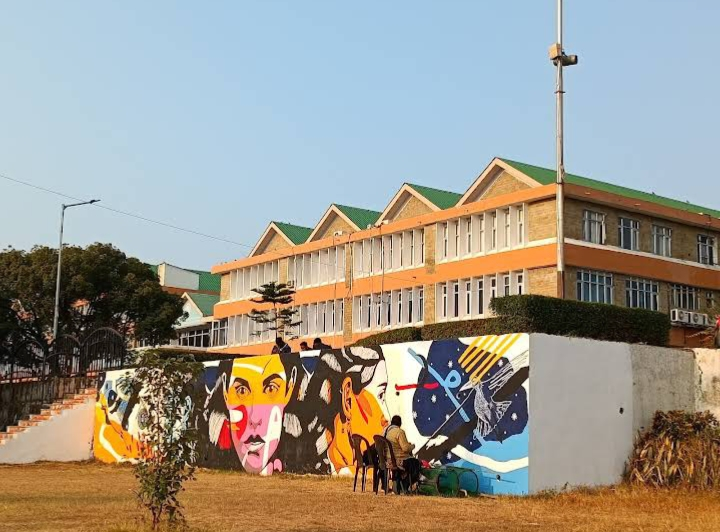
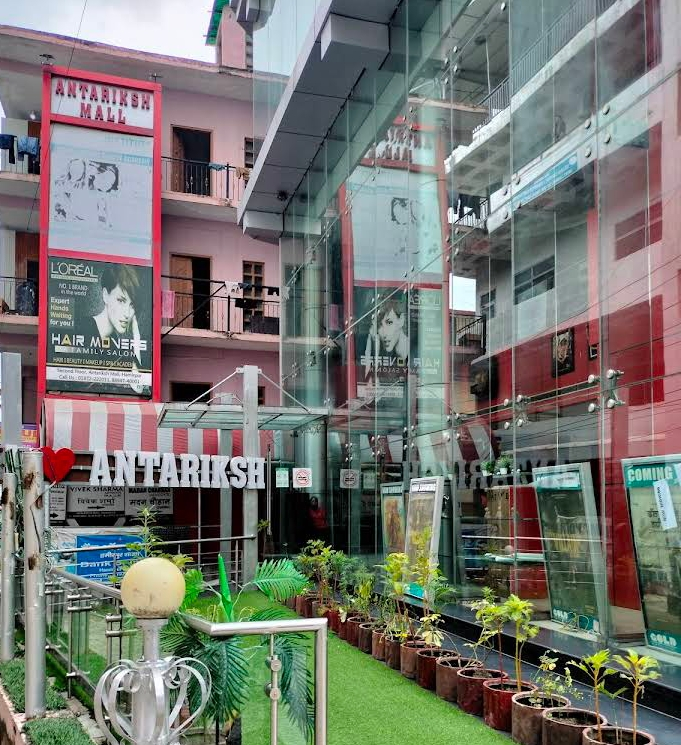
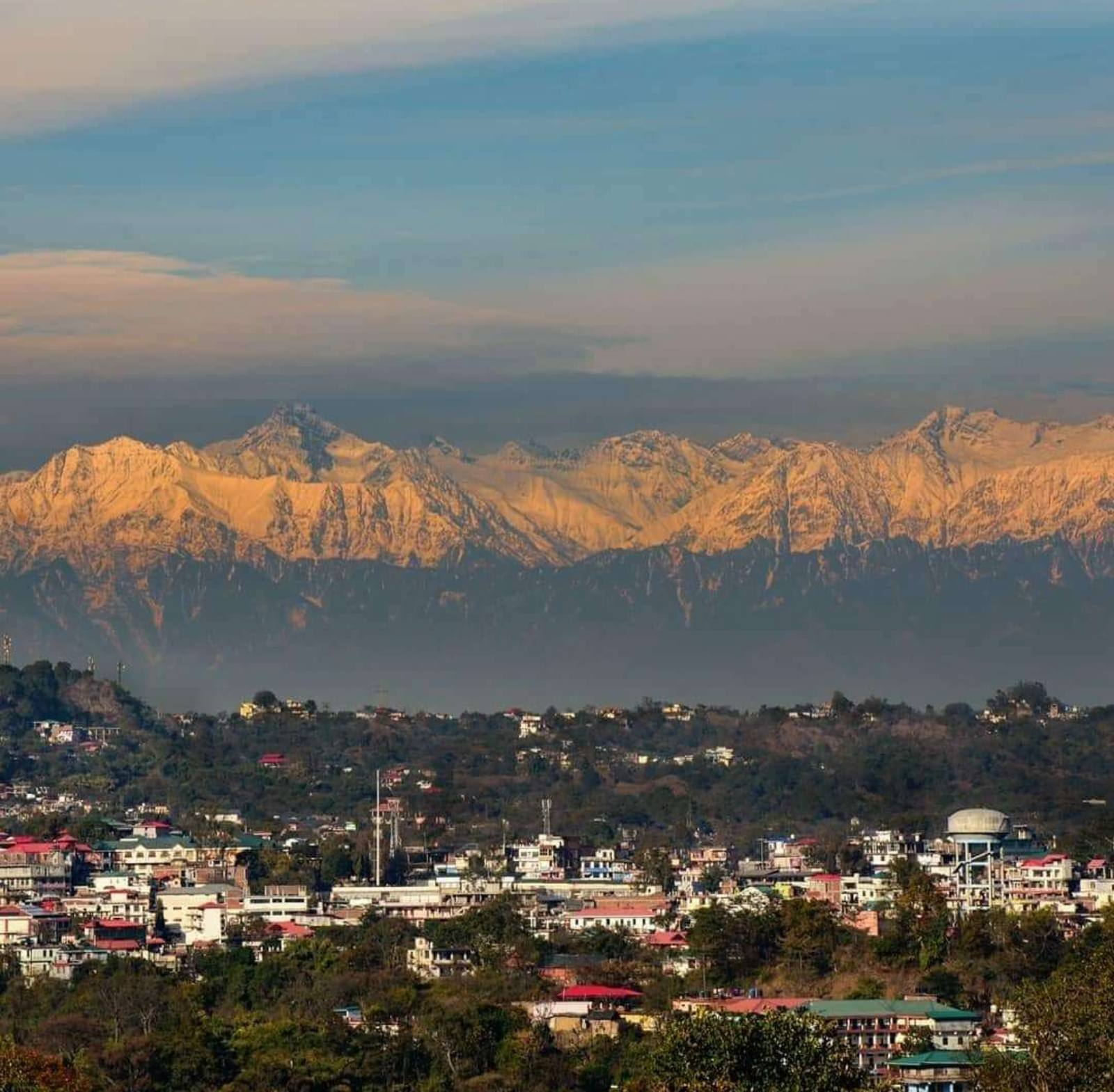
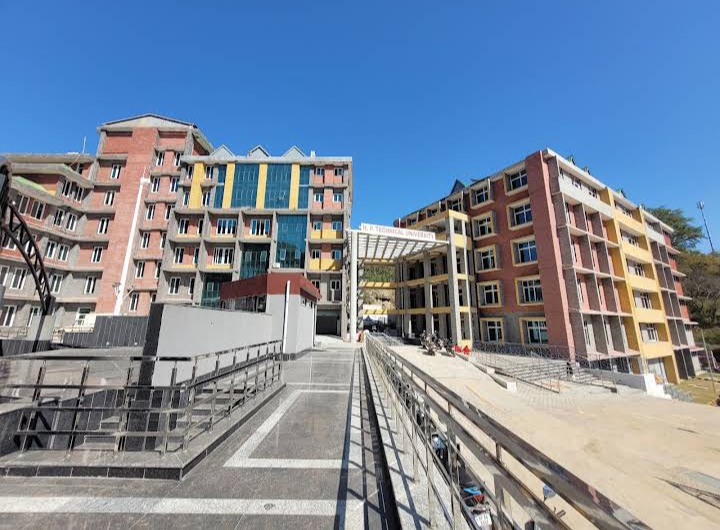
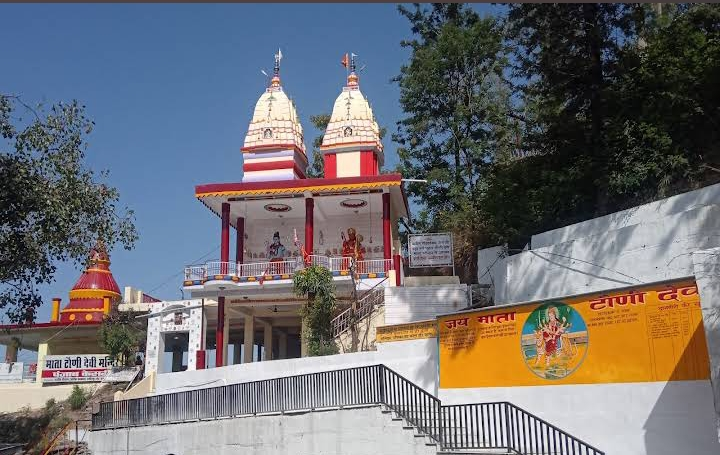
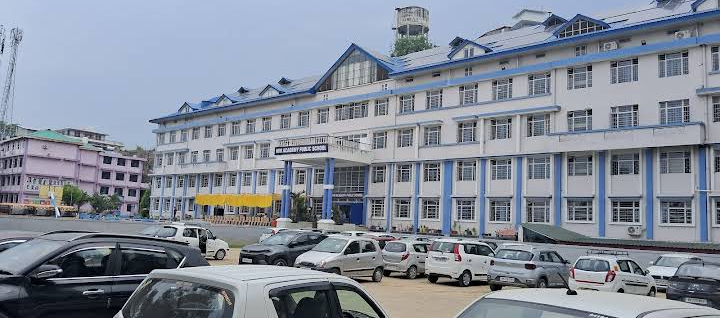
- From top, left to right: NIT Hamirpur, Antariksh Mall, Hamirpur city view with Dhauladhars, Himachal Pradesh Technical University, Tauni Devi Temple, Him Academy Public School

- Location in Himachal Pradesh, India with elevation 1,189 m (3,901ft) Hamirpur (India)
- Coordinates: 31.68°N 76.52°E
- Country: India
- State: Himachal Pradesh
- District: Hamirpur
- Founder: Raja Hamir Chand Katoch
- Named for: Derives its name from Raja Hamir Chand who ruled this area from 1700 AD to 1740 AD.
- Member of Legislative Assembly: Ashish Sharma

Government
  - Type: Municipal Corporation
  - Body: Municipal Corporation Hamirpur

Area
  - Total: 5.2 km^{2} (2.0 sq mi)

Population (2011)
  - Total: 17,604
  - Rank: 12 in HP
  - Density: 87,424/km^{2} (226,430/sq mi)

Languages
  - Official: Hindi
  - Native: Kangri
- Time zone: UTC+5:30 (IST)
- PIN: 177001
- Telephone code: +91- 01972
- Vehicle registration: HP-21, HP-22, HP-55, HP-67, HP-74, HP-84

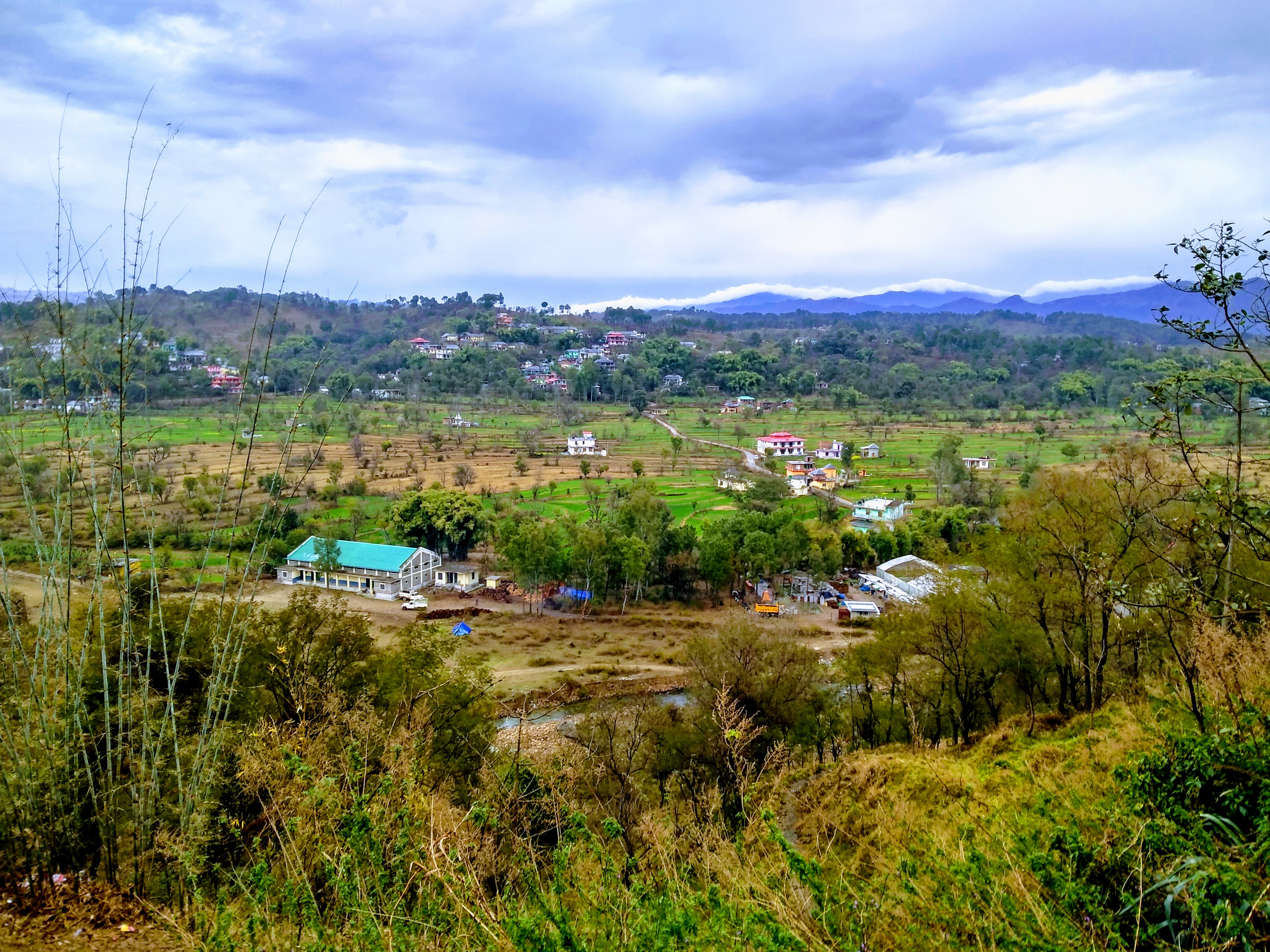

Hamirpur is a city, municipal council and the headquarters of Hamirpur district in the Indian state of Himachal Pradesh. It is covered by Shivalik Ranges. Hamirpur is located in the Lower West Central Outer Himalayas at an average elevation of 790 M above sea level. Far northern High Altitude Dhauladhar Ranges overlook the city. It is also a major junction on National Highway 3 while National Highway 103 starts at Here. Hamirpur is famous for its high literacy rate, educational institutions and traditional festival of Hamir Utsav. Hamirpur City is spread from Jhaniari to Bhota along NH 3 and NH 103 and is a prominent commercial centre for the district. It is Connected to the National Capital with regular HRTC Volvo and ordinary buses. The nearest airport is Kangra Airport and Mohali International Airport while the nearest railway is in Una at 79 km. Hamirpur City is surrounded by Pine tree forests and has a good city infrastructure ranging from quality educational institutions, NIT, State Universities and Skill Learning centres.

== Geography ==
The exact geographical co-ordinates of Hamirpur is 31.68°N 76.52°E, and the average elevation is 799 m. The highest point in Hamirpur is 1137m Awah Devi peak. Hamirpur experiences Short Warm summers from late April to June when temperature may go up to 40 °C, and cool winters from mid October to April having as low as 3 °C. Monsoon season starts in late June and lasts till early September with fair amount of rainfall. It snowed in some parts of the district in January 2012 and February 2019 respectively. It lies beneath the irregular pattern hills Of Lower Western Himalayas and southern Shivalik Ranges. It has a fair amount of pine forests.

== Demographics of Hamirpur town ==
These statistics are from the 2011 census of India; "growth" is the change since 2001 census data as a percentage of the 2001 data:

Description	Total	Male	Female
Population	17604	9056	8548
% of district pop.	3.87%	4.17%	3.6%
% of state pop.	0.2564%	0.2601%	0.2527%
Sex ratio (per 1000)	944		
Growth over 2001	2.04%	-2.91%	7.86%
Literates	14880	7803	7077
Literates % of pop.	84.53%	86.16%	82.79%
Area (km^{2})	5.2		
Density (pop/km^{2})	3385	1742	1644
Child (0-6 yrs) pop.	1606	838	768
Child (0-6 yrs) % of total pop.	9.12%	9.25%	8.98%
Child (0-6 yrs) sex ratio	916		

== Politics and leaders ==
This segment of Himachal Pradesh is also known as politically hot segment in state politics. BJP has a greater influence on this particular region. In 1967, Kanshiram Thakur was elected as first non congress MLA from this segment. Ramesh Verma of Congress remained MLA from 1972 to 1977. Later in 1977, an advocate by profession, Thakur Jagdev Chand (Nephew of Kanshiram Thakur) became the MLA of Hamirpur Vidhan Sabha seat by defeating Ramesh Verma.

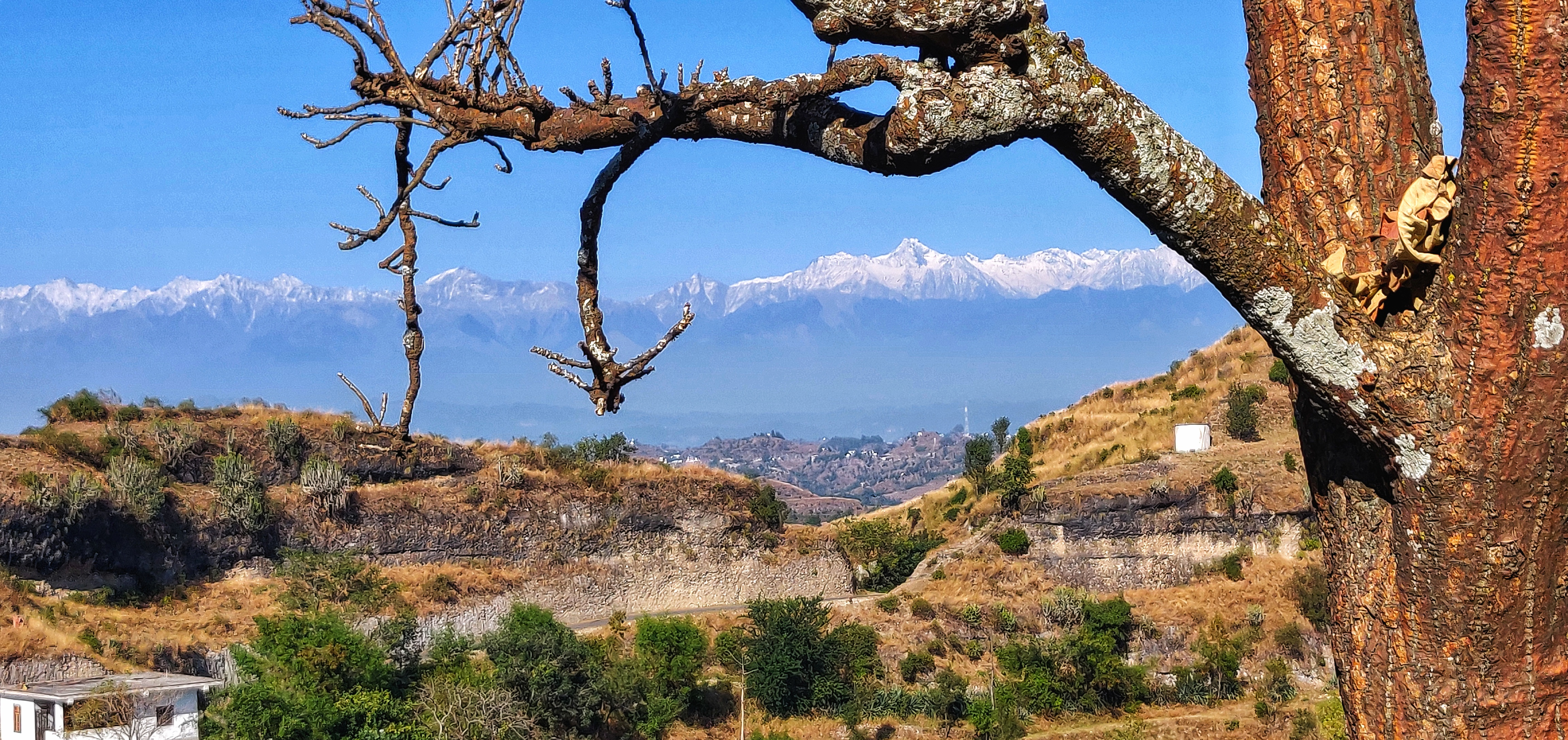
Village Rangar, Hamirpur, Himachal Pradesh, India

Thakur Jagdev Chand was a stalwart political figure of Himachal Pradesh, represented this constituency till December his death on 6 December 1993 just a week after his 5th victory in a row. Thakur was the only minister in Shanta Kumar's cabinet who managed the victory whereas Shanta Kumar himself and rest of his cabinet were defeated in 1993 assembly elections. BJP only won 7 seats. Narinder Thakur (son of Jagdev Chand) contested unsuccessfully the bi-election in 1994, whom BJP had selected after his father's sudden demise. Anita Verma of Congress remained MLA till 1998. In 1998, BJP offered ticket to Mrs. Urmil Thakur, elder daughter in law of Thakur, and she successfully contested the election and remained on the post till 2003. Family dispute lead to the defeat of Urmil Thakur as Mr. Narinder Thakur contested election as an independent candidate an attracted over 10000 votes (a huge number where total number of votes were around 50000). Anita Verma of Congress became MLA of Hamirpur for the second time and remained on the post till December 2007.

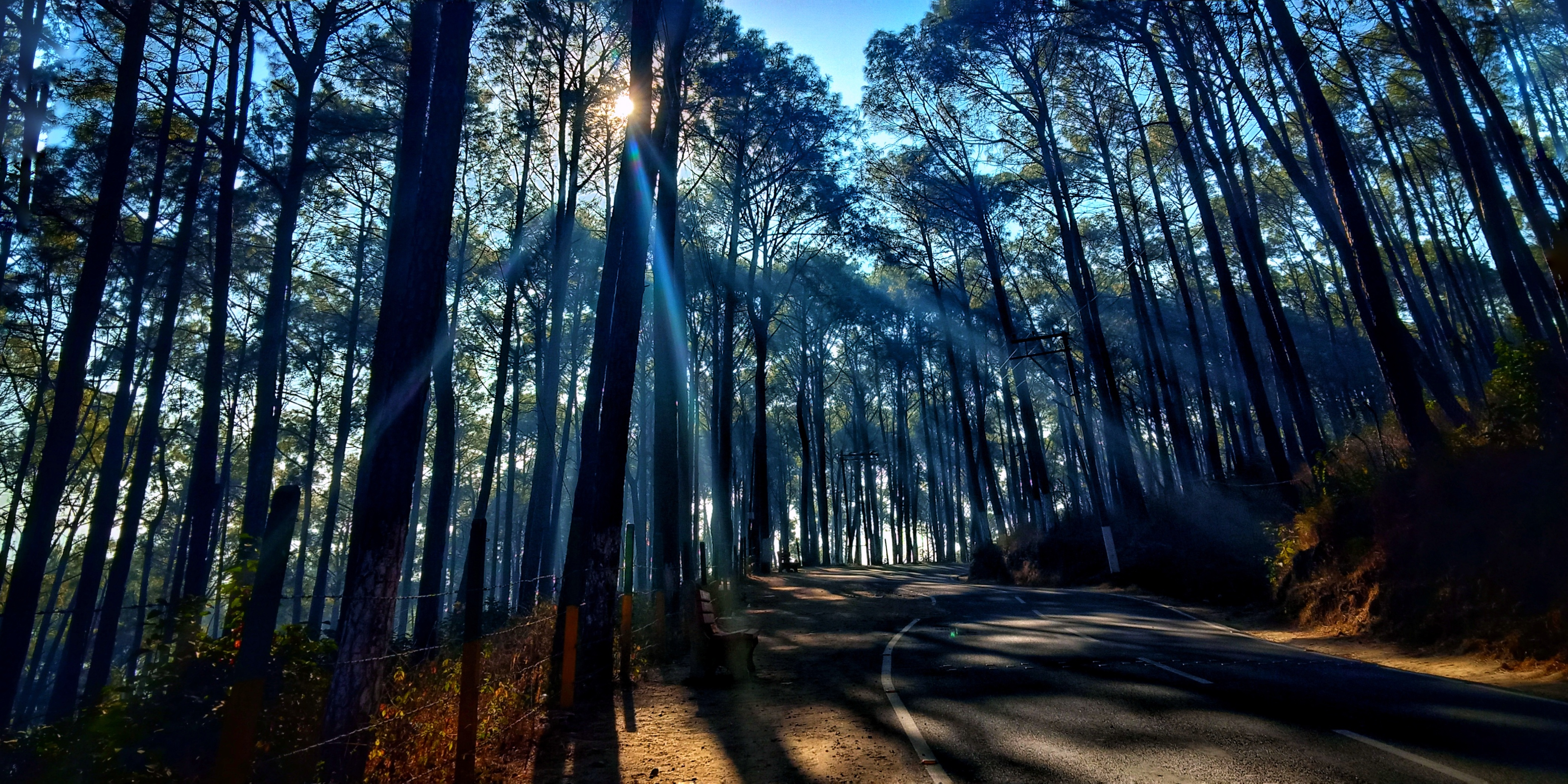
Children Park, Hamirpur, Himachal Pradesh

Urmil Thakur (MLA 1998-2003 and 2007-2012) managed her victory on the BJP ticket and won December 2007 election along with full support of her brother in law Narinder Thakur this time, with a margin of 6901 votes. As a tribute to a well respected leader among masses, state government opened a Government Degree College at Sujanpur and Town Hall at Hamirpur which were named after Thakur Jagdev Chand. A senior RSS member Thakur Ram Singh opened a history research institute at Neri, also named after the late Thakur Jagdev. Almost two decades have passed since Thakur died but his legacy and name still have considerable vote bank. Narinder Thakur rebelled against the sitting Chief Minister Proff. Prem Kumar Dhumal. Anurag Thakur won parliament bi-election for Hamirpur Lok Sabha seat with a huge margin 1.75 lacks in Aug 2008. In the May 2009 elections, he won by 73000 votes when he contested against Sh. Narinder Thakur, who had defected to Congress.

In 2012 assembly election a new assembly segment was created after delimitation named Sujanpur, Urmil Thakur(BJP) and Anita Verma(Congress) contested unsuccessful election against an independent candidate. Prem Kumar Dhumal decided to contest from Hamirpur and won by 9300 votes against Congress candidate Narinder Thakur. Narender Thakur after joining BJP again, successfully contested Sujanpur Bi-election in May 2014. Narender Thakur defeated Anita Rana, wife of Rajinder Singh Rana who contested as Congress candidate by 538 votes. In 2017 elections Narinder Thakur contested from Hamirpur on BJP ticket and won by 5394 defeating the congress candidate Kuldeep Singh Pathania. Chief Minister candidate of BJP, Prem Kumar Dhumal was defeated by INC candidate Rajinder Singh Rana in Sujanpur constituency.

In 2022 assembly election Mr Ashish Sharma an Independent candidate created history by becoming first independent candidate to win from Hamirpur assembly constituency, he won by a Margin of 12899 votes from Dr Pushpinder Verma (Son of Ramesh Verma) of Indian Nation Congress whereas Mr Narinder Thakur remained a distant third. In 2024, Ashish Sharma joined the BJP and was elected as a BJP candidate in the subsequent bypolls defeating Dr Pushpinder Verma (Son of Ramesh Verma) of Indian Nation Congress.

== Media and publication ==
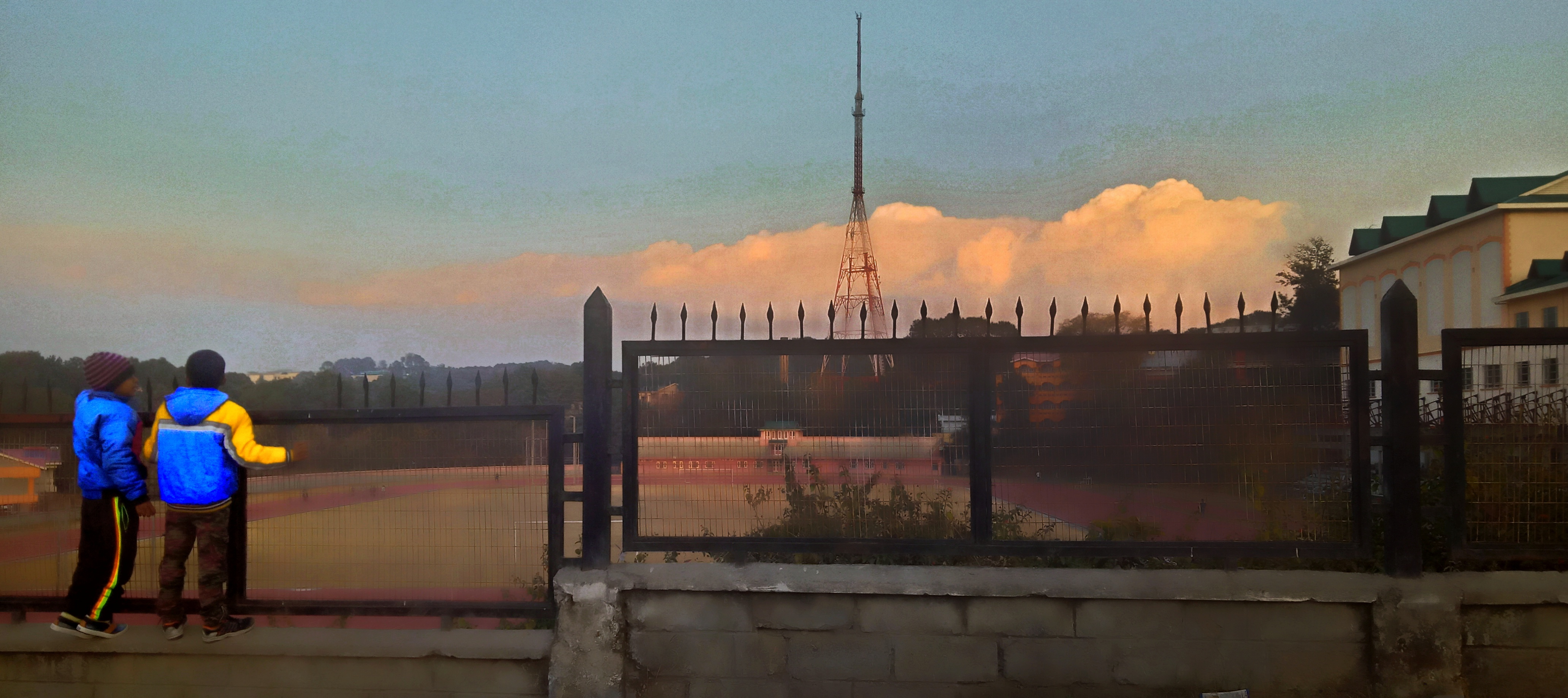
Synthetic Track

Print Media: Hamirpur town hosts bureau offices for national newspapers like Dainik Bhaskar, Dainik Jagran, Amar Ujala, Devbhumi Mirror, Punjab Kesari, and Dainik Sawera. Regional newspapers like Himachal Dustak, Divya Himachal and Aapka Faisla also have their offices in town. English News papers circulated in hamirpur are Indian Express, Hindustan Times, The Hindu, Times Of India and The Tribune.

Electronic Media: Numerous Indian and international television channels can be watched in Hamirpur through the local cable television provider. The national television broadcaster, Doordarshan, provides many channels like DD Shimla, DD National, DD Sports, DD Sports HD.

The wide range of Satellite and Cable channels available includes news channels such as Aaj Tak, Lokmat IBN, Zee News, ABP News, NDTV 24x7, sports channels like Ten Sports, ESPN, Star Sports, National entertainment channels like Colors, Sony, Zee TV and STAR Plus. Other News channels include Devbhumi Mirror News which showcases current News and Culture of Hill State. Other local cable Tv channels are Pole Star Himachal, Omnero Music, Omnero Clasic, Omnero Movies, Omnero Pahadi which are broadcast on local Cable TV in Hamirpur.

Radio: AIR All India Radio has a broadcast and recording studio in Hamirpur which has coverage in all areas of Hamirpur district.

== Events ==
Hamirpur's Hamir Utsav 3 Days mostly in early winters is main event here. Sujanpur's Holi Mahotsav is a grand 3 Days event on Holi Festival. Samtana Dushehra is 1 day event on Dushehra Festival Eve.

== Temples ==
Shri Sidh Baba Balak Nath Temple, Deothsidh, is the biggest holy shrine in Barsar tehsil of the district. It is situated on the Deotsidh Dhar Range in Sivalik Hills. It stretches across 44 kilometers from Hamirpur, 123 kilometers from Shimla, 145 kilometers from Chandigarh, 93 kilometers from Nangal Dam railway station, 64 kilometers from Una, 16 kilometers from Barsar and about 5 kilometers from Shah Talai.

The ancient Gasoteshwar Mahadev Temple built by Pandavas is situated at Gasota which is 7 km away from the district headquarter.

== Education ==
Hamirpur has a Highest literacy rate in Himachal Pradesh. 88.15 percent people are educated in Hamirpur.

=== Degree Colleges in Hamirpur Distt ===
- Netaji Subhash Chandra Bose Memorial PG college, Anu, Hamirpur
- Govt College Nadaun Hamirpur
- Govt College Barsar Hamirpur
- Govt College Bhoranj Hamirpur
- Govt College Sujanpur Tira Hamirpur

== See also ==
- IEC Institute of Health Sciences & Research
