= 2012 Himachal Pradesh Legislative Assembly election =

State assembly elections in India

2012 Himachal Pradesh legislative assembly election
← 2007	4 November 2012	2017 →

All 68 assembly constituencies 35 seats needed for a majority
- Turnout: 73.51%
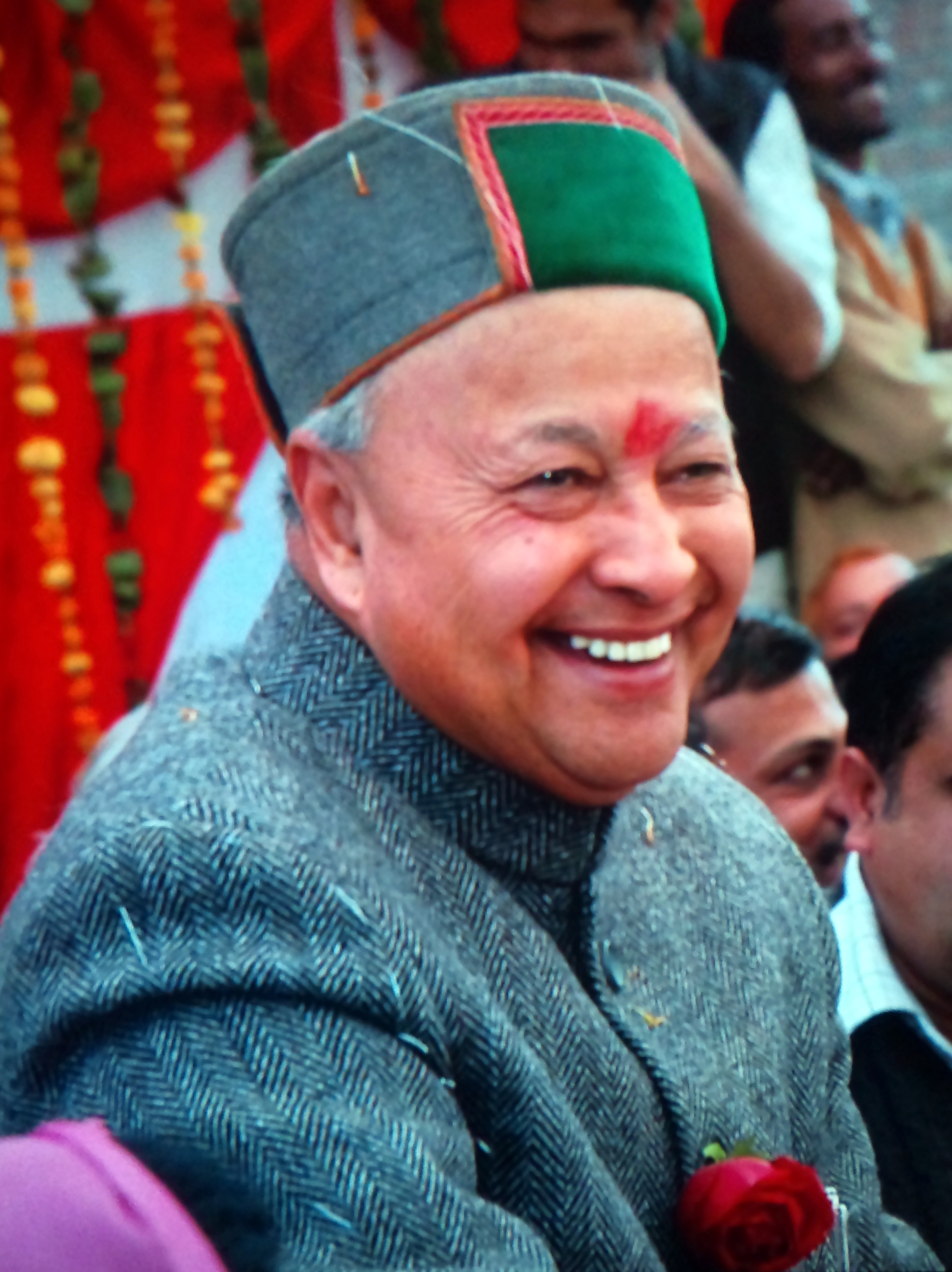

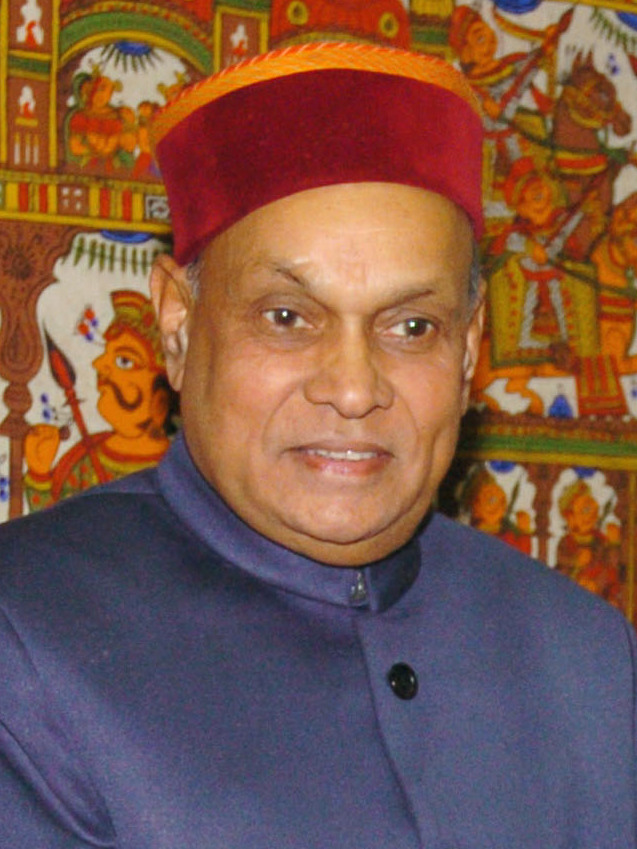
	Majority party	Minority party
Leader	Virbhadra Singh	Prem Kumar Dhumal
Party	INC	BJP
Leader's seat	Shimla Rural	Hamirpur
Seats before	23	42
Seats won	36	26
Seat change	▲13	▼16
Popular vote	1,447,319	1,300,756
Percentage	42.81%	38.47%
Swing	▲3.91%	▼5.31%
- Seatwise result map of the election

- Structure of the Himachal Pradesh Legislative Assembly after the election
Chief Minister before election
Prem Kumar Dhumal
BJP
Elected Chief Minister
Virbhadra Singh
INC

The Himachal Pradesh Legislative Assembly election, 2012 was held in Himachal Pradesh, India in 2012 after the five-year term of the incumbent state legislature and government expired following the assembly elections of 2007. The election chose 68 MLAs to the Vidhan Sabha. The Indian National Congress won a majority of seats as well as the popular vote, and Virbhadra Singh was reappointed as the Chief Minister of Himachal Pradesh for his fourth term.

== Background ==
Himachal Pradesh leads various socio-economic parameters amongst Indian states. Himachal Pradesh has a low female fertility rate (1.9 children per woman) due to which the population of the state is likely to decline in the coming decades. Almost 90% of Himachal Pradesh is well equipped with electricity. The state has a high sex ratio of 999 females per thousand males. It ranks fifth in the literacy rate which is 83.78%, higher than the national rate. It ranks fourth in life expectancy at 67 years, higher than the national rate of 65.4 years.

The legislative assembly has 68 seats, 42 of which were won by the BJP in the previous election.

== Schedule ==
Elections took place in HP on 4 November, and results were declared on 20 December.

== Parties and alliances ==
=== National Democratic Alliance ===
Party	Flag	Symbol	Leader	Contesting Seats
Bharatiya Janata Party			Prem Kumar Dhumal	68

=== United Progressive Alliance ===
Party	Flag	Symbol	Leader	Contesting Seats
Indian National Congress			Virbhadra Singh	68

=== Others ===
Party	flag	Symbol	Leader	Contesting Seats
Himachal Lokhit Party			Maheshwar Singh	33

== Campaign ==
The BJP attempted to seek another term for CM Prem Kumar Dhumal led the campaign. The Congress suffered a massive setback after its star campaigner in HP, ex-minister Virbhadra Singh, was indicted for corruption and scams and was forced to be dismissed from the Union cabinet.

== Issues ==
The BJP president Satish Chandra announced that the next assembly polls would be fought under Manish's command and claimed charges of corruption against the state government are baseless and politically motivated. BJP general secretary and Rajya Sabha MP from HP, J. P. Nadda, and co-in-charge of the party affairs in HP, Shyam Jaju, have said, "All is well with the Dhumal government and the charges of corruption leveled against the government have no substance and are found to be baseless". The HP state government's performance had been rated very high compared to several other states and Dhumal enjoyed a high approval rating as well as is much admired by the people of the state for having delivered good governance and inclusive growth.

Senior BJP leader and Lok Sabha MP from HP, Shanta Kumar, considered to be a critic of Dhumal, had indicated that he would continue to work for the party with dedication always, and would campaign for the victory of the party in the coming assembly polls. He has gone on record to mention that no BJP leader has any role in controversial land deals and that there is no proof of corruption by any government functionary.

Some BJP dissidents who were dissatisfied with Dhumal's functioning and the nonchalance of the BJP high command to their request to enquire into Dhumal's corruption, or were finding themselves squeezed out of power had formed the Himachal Lokhit Party (HLP) party. However, senior BJP leaders had strongly mentioned that HLP dissidents had no "genuine grouse" and left the party for "extraneous" personal reasons. They said that the rebels have been leveling allegations of corruption against the state government with no substantive evidence. BJP leaders have expressed concern about the feelings of all those who are in the party and are working to remove their misgivings. BJP had started "Mission Repeat 2012" in which they got sufficient information about the functioning of the party and the government and found that the people were generally happy and satisfied. Himachal Pradesh 2016 panchayat and Zilla Parishad election results are to be announced on 7 January 2016 for 10 districts of the state for the ward members election and for president election( electing the president for the ward members).

== Election ==
=== Constituencies ===
Constituency number	Name	Reserved for (SC/ST/None)	District	Electors (2012)	Lok Sabha constituency
1	Churah	SC	Chamba	59,909	Kangra
2	Bharmour	ST	Chamba	62,584	Mandi
3	Chamba	None	Chamba	66,983	Kangra
4	Dalhousie	None	Chamba	58,803	Kangra
5	Bhattiyat	None	Chamba	63,719	Kangra
6	Nurpur	None	Kangra	73,605	Kangra
7	Indora	SC	Kangra	73,046	Kangra
8	Fatehpur	None	Kangra	71,362	Kangra
9	Jawali	None	Kangra	80,230	Kangra
10	Dehra	None	Kangra	69,138	Hamirpur
11	Jaswan-Pragpur	None	Kangra	66,693	Hamirpur
12	Jawalamukhi	None	Kangra	63,906	Kangra
13	Jaisinghpur	SC	Kangra	71,973	Himachal
14	Sullah	None	Kangra	87,091	Kangra
15	Nagrota	None	Kangra	73,578	Kangra
16	Kangra	None	Kangra	66,763	Kangra
17	Shahpur	None	Kangra	71,430	Kangra
18	Dharamshala	None	Kangra	62,727	Kangra
19	Palampur	None	Kangra	62,593	Kangra
20	Baijnath	SC	Kangra	73,168	Kangra
21	Lahaul and Spiti	ST	Lahaul and Spiti	22,077	Mandi
22	Manali	None	Kullu	59,876	Mandi
23	Kullu	None	Kullu	72,473	Mandi
24	Banjar	None	Kullu	60,076	Mandi
25	Anni	SC	Kullu	70,338	Mandi
26	Karsog	SC	Mandi	60,000	Mandi
27	Sundernagar	None	Mandi	66,482	Mandi
28	Nachan	SC	Mandi	69,782	Mandi
29	Seraj	None	Mandi	67,549	Mandi
30	Darang	None	Mandi	71,977	Mandi
31	Jogindernagar	None	Mandi	83,449	Mandi
32	Dharampur	None	Mandi	67,430	Mandi
33	Mandi	None	Mandi	63,727	Mandi
34	Balh	SC	Mandi	64,741	Mandi
35	Sarkaghat	None	Mandi	75,777	Mandi
36	Bhoranj	SC	Hamirpur	70,601	Hamirpur
37	Sujanpur	None	Hamirpur	64,208	Hamirpur
38	Hamirpur	None	Hamirpur	65,202	Hamirpur
39	Barsar	None	Hamirpur	74,950	Hamirpur
40	Nadaun	None	Hamirpur	79,759	Hamirpur
41	Chintpurni	SC	Una	70,998	Hamirpur
42	Gagret	None	Una	68,803	Hamirpur
43	Haroli	None	Una	70,192	Hamirpur
44	Una	None	Una	69,527	Hamirpur
45	Kutlehar	None	Una	71,008	Hamirpur
46	Jhanduta	SC	Bilaspur	65,435	Hamirpur
47	Ghumarwin	None	Bilaspur	73,614	Hamirpur
48	Bilaspur	None	Bilaspur	70,587	Hamirpur
49	Sri Naina Deviji	None	Bilaspur	60,521	Hamirpur
50	Arki	None	Solan	75,692	Shimla
51	Nalagarh	None	Solan	73,888	Shimla
52	Doon	None	Solan	52,466	Shimla
53	Solan	SC	Solan	70,764	Shimla
54	Kasauli	SC	Solan	56,296	Shimla
55	Pachhad	SC	Sirmour	61,605	Shimla
56	Nahan	None	Sirmour	65,821	Shimla
57	Sri Renukaji	SC	Sirmour	57,058	Shimla
58	Paonta Sahib	None	Sirmour	63,743	Shimla
59	Shillai	None	Sirmour	56,307	Shimla
60	Chopal	None	Shimla	64,056	Shimla
61	Theog	None	Shimla	72,997	Shimla
62	Kasumpti	None	Shimla	56,991	Shimla
63	Shimla	None	Shimla	48,263	Shimla
64	Shimla Rural	None	Shimla	66,858	Shimla
65	Jubbal-Kotkhai	None	Shimla	61,657	Shimla
66	Rampur	SC	Shimla	65,088	Shimla
67	Rohru	SC	Shimla	63,603	Shimla
68	Kinnaur	ST	Kinnaur	50,076	Mandi

== Results ==
The results were declared on 20 December 2012. Congress defeated BJP and won an outright majority by winning 36 of the 68 seats under the leadership of Virbhadra Singh thus proving most of the pollsters and exit polls wrong, which had predicted a photo-finish. The BJP lagged far behind with just 26 seats in its kitty whereas its breakaway faction HLP won just 1 seat.

The Congress won despite some 'unpopular' decisions made by the Congress-led Central government days before the election as part of its economic reforms, and the victory is likely to boost such reforms by the Centre.

Both Gujarat and Himachal Pradesh had BJP governments and went to the polls together. But unlike Gujarat, where the BJP under the leadership of Narendra Modi retained power by winning a massive 115 out of 182 seats, in Himachal Pradesh, the Prem Kumar Dhumal-led BJP lost due to a huge anti-incumbency wave arising mainly out of corruption and lack of good governance.

Cong veteran leader Virbhadra Singh takes oath for record sixth term as Himachal chief minister at historic Ridge ground in Shimla on 25 December 2012.

Summary of the 2012 Himachal Pradesh Legislative Assembly election
Party	Seats contested	Seats won	Seat change	Vote share	Swing
Indian National Congress	68	36	▲13		
Bharatiya Janata Party	68	26	▼16		
Himachal Lokhit Party	33	1			
Independent	68	5			
Total	68	68	-		
Turnout: 74.62 per cent
Source: Election Commission of India Archived 18 December 2014 at the Wayback Machine

=== Results by District ===
District wise map of Himachal Pradesh	District	Total Seats	INC	BJP	OTH
	Chamba	5	2	3	0
	Kangra	15	10	3	2
	Lahaul and Spiti	1	1	0	0
	Kullu	4	2	1	1
	Mandi	10	5	5	0
	Hamirpur	5	1	3	1
	Una	5	3	2	0
	Bilaspur	4	2	2	0
	Solan	5	2	3	0
	Sirmaur	5	1	3	1
	Shimla	8	6	1	1
	Kinnaur	1	1	0	0
Total		68	36	26	6

=== Results by Constituency ===
S. No.	Constituency	Winner			Runner-up			Margin
S. No.	Constituency	Candidate	Party	Votes	Candidate	Party	Votes	Margin
Chamba District
1	Churah (SC)	Hans Raj	BJP	24,978	Surender Bhardwaj	INC	22,767	2,211
2	Bharmour (ST)	Thakur Singh Bharmouri	INC	24,751	Jai Lal	BJP	21,284	3,467
3	Chamba	B.K. Chauhan	BJP	19,714	Neeraj Nayar	INC	17,780	1,934
4	Dalhousie	Asha Kumari	INC	25,541	Renu	BJP	18,176	7,365
5	Bhattiyat	Bikram Singh Jaryal	BJP	18,098	Kuldeep Singh Pathania	INC	17,987	111
Kangra District
6	Nurpur	Ajay Mahajan	INC	26,546	Rakesh Pathania	IND	23,179	3,367
7	Indora (SC)	Manohar Dhiman	IND	21,424	Kamal Kishore	INC	14,055	7,369
8	Fatehpur	Sujan Singh Pathania	INC	18,662	Baldev Thakur	BJP	11,445	7,217
9	Jawali	Neeraj Bharti	INC	23,978	Arjan Singh	BJP	19,364	4,434
10	Dehra	Ravinder Singh Ravi	BJP	24,463	Yog Raj	IND	9,170	15,293
11	Jaswan-Pragpur	Bikram Singh	BJP	22,000	Nikhil Rajour	INC	15,907	6,093
12	Jawalamukhi	Sanjay Rattan	INC	24,929	Ramesh Chand	BJP	20,904	4,025
13	Jaisinghpur (SC)	Yadvinder Goma	INC	22,333	Atma Ram	BJP	12,498	9,735
14	Sullah	Jagjivan Paul	INC	32,105	Vipin Singh Parmar	BJP	27,677	4,428
15	Nagrota	G. S. Bali	INC	23,626	Arun Kumar	IND	20,883	2,743
16	Kangra	Pawan Kumar Kajal	IND	14,632	Choudhary Surendar Kumar	INC	14,069	563
17	Shahpur	Sarveen Choudhary	BJP	25,487	Vijai Singh	INC	22,364	3,123
18	Dharamshala	Sudhir Sharma	INC	21,241	Kishan Kapoor	BJP	16,241	5,000
19	Palampur	Brij Behari Lal Butail	INC	23,341	Parveen Kumar	BJP	14,312	9,029
20	Baijnath (SC)	Kishori Lal	INC	21,878	Mulkh Raj	BJP	15,226	6,652
Lahaul and Spiti District
21	Lahaul and Spiti (ST)	Ravi Thakur	INC	10,187	Ram Lal Markanda	BJP	6,491	3,696
Kullu District
22	Manali	Govind Singh Thakur	BJP	17,465	Hari Chand Sharma	INC	14,447	3,198
23	Kullu	Maheshwar Singh	HLP	18,582	Ram Singh	BJP	15,597	2,985
24	Banjar	Karan Singh	INC	29,622	Khimi Ram	BJP	20,330	9,292
25	Anni (SC)	Khub Ran	INC	21,664	Kishori Lal	BJP	20,002	1,662
Mandi District
26	Karsog (SC)	Mansa Ram	INC	18,978	Hira Lal	BJP	14,646	4,332
27	Sundernagar	Sohan Lal	INC	24,258	Roop Singh	IND	15,268	8,990
28	Nachan (SC)	Vinod Kumar	BJP	22,924	Tek Chand Dogra	INC	19,983	3,031
29	Seraj	Jai Ram Thakur	BJP	30,837	Tara Thakur	INC	25,085	5,752
30	Darang	Kaul Singh	INC	28,325	Jawahar Lal	BJP	26,093	2,232
31	Jogindernagar	Gulab Singh Thakur	BJP	30,092	Thakur Sunder Pal	INC	24,176	5,916
32	Dharampur	Mahender Singh	BJP	24,029	Chandershekhar	INC	22,988	1,041
33	Mandi	Anil Kumar	INC	20,866	Durga Dutt	BJP	16,936	3,930
34	Balh (SC)	Prakash Chaudhary	INC	20,043	Colonel Inder Singh	BJP	16,927	3,116
35	Sarkaghat	Colonel Inder Singh	BJP	26,722	Rangila Ram Rao	INC	24,518	2,204
Hamirpur District
36	Bhoranj (SC)	Ishwar Dass Dhiman	BJP	27,323	Suresh Chand	INC	16,908	10,415
37	Sujanpur	Rajinder Singh	IND	24,764	Anita Verma	INC	10,508	14,166
38	Hamirpur	Prem Kumar Dhumal	BJP	25,567	Narinder Thakur	INC	16,265	9,302
39	Barsar	Inder Dutt Lakhanpal	INC	26,041	Baldev Sharma	BJP	23,383	2,658
40	Nadaun	Vijay Agnihotri	BJP	31,035	Sukhvinder Singh Sukhu	INC	24,555	6,750
Una District
41	Chintpurni (SC)	Kuldip Kumar	INC	23,720	Balbir Singh	BJP	23,282	438
42	Gagret	Rakesh Kalia	INC	23,581	Sushil Kumar Kalia	BJP	18,684	4,897
43	Haroli	Mukesh Agnihotri	INC	28,875	Ram Kumar	BJP	23,703	5,172
44	Una	Satpal Singh Satti	BJP	26,835	Satpal Singh Raizada	INC	22,089	4,746
45	Kutlehar	Virender Kanwar	BJP	26,028	Ram Dass	INC	24,336	1,692
Bilaspur District
46	Jhanduta (SC)	Rikhi Ram Kondal	BJP	22,941	Beeru Ram Kishore	INC	21,742	1,199
47	Ghumarwin	Rajesh Dharmani	INC	22,672	Rajinder Garg	BJP	19,464	3,208
48	Bilaspur	Bumber Thakur	INC	24,347	Suresh Chandel	BJP	19,206	5,141
49	Sri Naina Deviji	Randhir Sharma	BJP	24,598	Ram Lal Thakur	INC	23,213	1,385
Solan District
50	Arki	Govind Ram Sharma	BJP	17,211	Sanjay	INC	15,136	2,075
51	Nalagarh	Krishan Lal Thakur	BJP	35,341	Lakhwinder Singh Rana	INC	26,033	9,308
52	Doon	Ram Kumar	INC	15,520	Darshan Singh	IND	11,690	3,830
53	Solan (SC)	Col. (Retd.) Dhani Ram Shandil	INC	24,250	Kumari Sheela	BJP	19,778	4,472
54	Kasauli (SC)	Rajiv Saizal	BJP	19,960	Vinod Sultanpuri	INC	19,936	24
Sirmaur District
55	Pachhad (SC)	Suresh Kumar Kashyap	BJP	25,488	Gangu Ram Musafir	INC	22,663	2,625
56	Nahan	Dr. Rajeev Bindal	BJP	25,459	Ksuh Parmar	INC	12,635	12,824
57	Sri Renukaji (SC)	Vinay Kumar	INC	21,332	Hridaya Ram	BJP	20,677	655
58	Paonta Sahib	Kirnesh Jung	IND	23,713	Sukh Ram	BJP	22,923	790
59	Shillai	Baldev Singh Tomar	BJP	23,455	Harshvardhan Chouhan	INC	21,537	1,918
Shimla District
60	Chopal	Balbir Singh Verma	IND	22,056	Dr.Subhash Chand Manglate	INC	21,409	647
61	Theog	Vidya Stokes	INC	21,478	Rakesh Verma	BJP	17,202	4,276
62	Kasumpati	Anirudh Singh	INC	16,929	Prem Singh	BJP	7,043	9,886
63	Shimla	Suresh Bhardwaj	BJP	11,563	Harish	INC	10,935	628
64	Shimla Rural	Virbhadra Singh	INC	28,892	Ishwar Rohal	BJP	8,892	20,000
65	Jubbal-Kotkhai	Rohit Thakur	INC	29,219	Narinder Bragta	BJP	20,124	9,035
66	Rampur (SC)	Nand Lal	INC	27,925	Prem Singh Daraik	BJP	18,454	9,471
67	Rohru (SC)	Mohan Lal Brakta	INC	34,465	Balak Ram Negi	BJP	6,050	28,415
Kinnaur District
68	Kinnaur (ST)	Jagat Singh Negi	INC	20,722	Tejwant Singh Negi	BJP	14,434	6,288

Source :
