= Sujanpur, Himachal Pradesh Assembly constituency =

Legislative Assembly constituency in Himachal Pradesh State, India

Coordinates: 31.83°N 76.5°E

Sujanpur
- Constituency No. 37 for the Himachal Pradesh Legislative Assembly

Constituency details
- Country: India
- Region: North India
- State: Himachal Pradesh
- District: Hamirpur
- Lok Sabha constituency: Hamirpur
- Established: 2008
- Total electors: 75,396
- Reservation: None

Member of Legislative Assembly
- 14th Himachal Pradesh Legislative Assembly
- Incumbent Ranjit Singh
- Party: Indian National Congress
- Elected year: 2024

Sujanpur Assembly constituency is one of the 68 constituencies in the Himachal Pradesh Legislative Assembly of Himachal Pradesh a northern state of India covering Tira Sujanpur. It is part of Hamirpur, Himachal Pradesh Lok Sabha constituency.

== Members of Legislative Assembly ==
Year	Member	Picture	Party
2012	Rajinder Singh Rana		Independent
2014 (Note: by-election)	Narinder Thakur		Bharatiya Janata Party
2017	Rajinder Singh Rana		Indian National Congress
2022	Rajinder Singh Rana		Indian National Congress
2024 (Note: by-election)	Capt. Ranjit Singh		Indian National Congress

== Election results ==
=== 2024 By-election ===
2024 Himachal Pradesh By-election: Sujanpur
Party	Candidate	Votes	%	±%
INC	Captain Ranjit Singh	29,529	51.40%	▲1.61
BJP	Rajinder Singh Rana	27,089	47.16%	▼1.91
NCP	Ravinder Singh Dogra	334	0.58%	New
Independent	Anil Rana	134	0.23%	New
Independent	Sher Singh	71	0.12%	New
Independent	Rajesh Kumar	46	0.08%	New
NOTA	Nota	241	0.42%	▼0.01
Margin of victory		2,440	4.24%	▲3.52
Turnout		57,444	76.32%	▲2.58
Registered electors		75,396		Steady
INC hold		Swing	▲1.61	

=== Assembly Election 2022 ===
2022 Himachal Pradesh Legislative Assembly election: Sujanpur
Party	Candidate	Votes	%	±%
INC	Rajinder Singh Rana	27,679	49.79%	▲0.98
BJP	Ranjeet Singh Rana	27,280	49.07%	▲3.97
NOTA	Nota	237	0.43%	▼0.51
AAP	Anil Rana	212	0.38%	New
BSP	Gian Chand	103	0.19%	New
Independent	Rajesh Kumar	86	0.15%	New
Margin of victory		399	0.72%	▼2.99
Turnout		55,597	73.74%	▼1.90
Registered electors		75,396		▲10.06
INC hold		Swing	▲0.98	

=== Assembly Election 2017 ===
2017 Himachal Pradesh Legislative Assembly election: Sujanpur
Party	Candidate	Votes	%	±%
INC	Rajinder Singh Rana	25,288	48.80%	▲0.18
BJP	Prem Kumar Dhumal	23,369	45.10%	▼4.69
CPI(M)	Joginder Kumar Thakur	1,023	1.97%	New
NOTA	None of the Above	485	0.94%	New
NCP	Ravinder Singh Dogra	344	0.66%	New
Margin of victory		1,919	3.70%	▲2.54
Turnout		51,819	75.64%	▼23.34
Registered electors		68,504		▲46.82
INC gain from BJP		Swing	▼0.98	

=== Assembly By-election 2014 ===
2014 Himachal Pradesh Legislative Assembly by-election: Sujanpur
Party	Candidate	Votes	%	±%
BJP	Narinder Thakur	22,993	49.78%	▲30.14
INC	Anita Kumari Rana	22,455	48.62%	▲25.30
BSP	Parveen Thakur	387	0.84%	▲0.27
Independent	Subhash Chand	352	0.76%	New
NOTA	Nota	351	0.76%	New
Margin of victory		538	1.16%	▼30.26
Turnout		46,187	100.00%	▲29.65
Registered electors		46,659		▼28.22
BJP gain from Independent		Swing	▼4.96	

=== Assembly Election 2012 ===
2012 Himachal Pradesh Legislative Assembly election: Sujanpur
Party	Candidate	Votes	%	±%
Independent	Rajinder Singh Rana	24,674	54.74%	New
INC	Anita Verma	10,508	23.31%	New
BJP	Urmil Thakur	8,853	19.64%	New
BSP	Parveen Thakur	258	0.57%	New
Independent	Parveen Thakur	237	0.53%	New
Margin of victory		14,166	31.43%	
Turnout		45,072	69.34%	
Registered electors		65,006		
Independent win (new seat)				

== See also ==
- Hamirpur district
- List of constituencies of Himachal Pradesh Legislative Assembly
