= Hamirpur Assembly constituency =

Hamirpur Assembly constituency may refer to

- Hamirpur, Himachal Pradesh Assembly constituency
- Hamirpur, Uttar Pradesh Assembly constituency
