= Hamirpur, Himachal Pradesh Assembly constituency =

Constituency of the Himachal Pradesh legislative assembly in India

Coordinates: 31.69°N 76.52°E

Hamirpur
- Constituency No. 38 for the Himachal Pradesh Legislative Assembly

Constituency details
- Country: India
- Region: North India
- State: Himachal Pradesh
- District: Hamirpur
- Lok Sabha constituency: Hamirpur
- Established: 1967
- Total electors: 76,646
- Reservation: None

Member of Legislative Assembly
- 14th Himachal Pradesh Legislative Assembly
- Incumbent Ashish Sharma
- Party: Bharatiya Janata Party
- Elected year: 2024

Hamirpur is one of the 68 assembly constituencies of Himachal Pradesh a northern state of India. Hamirpur assembly constituency, is located in the Hamirpur district and also a part of the Hamirpur Himachal Lok Sabha Constituency.

== Members of Legislative Assembly ==
Year	Member	Picture	Party
1967	K. Ram		Bharatiya Jana Sangh
1972	Ramesh Chand Verma		Indian National Congress
1977	Jagdev Chand		Janata Party
1982	Jagdev Chand		Bharatiya Janata Party
1985	Jagdev Chand		Bharatiya Janata Party
1990	Jagdev Chand		Bharatiya Janata Party
1993	Jagdev Chand		Bharatiya Janata Party
1995 (by-election)	Anita Verma		Indian National Congress
1998	Urmil Thakur		Bharatiya Janata Party
2003	Anita Verma		Indian National Congress
2007	Urmil Thakur		Bharatiya Janata Party
2012	Prem Kumar Dhumal		Bharatiya Janata Party
2017	Narinder Thakur		Bharatiya Janata Party
2022	Ashish Sharma		Independent
2024^	Ashish Sharma		Bharatiya Janata Party

== Election results ==
=== 2024 by-election ===
Himachal Pradesh Legislative Assembly by-election 2024: Hamirpur
Party	Candidate	Votes	%	±%
BJP	Ashish Sharma	27,041	51.23	▲27.98
INC	Dr. Pushpinder Verma	25,470	48.25	▲24.6
NOTA	None of the Above	198	0.37	▼0.07
Independent	Nand Lal Sharma	74	0.14	New
Majority		1,571	2.98	▼20.46
Turnout		52,783	67.72	▼4.09
BJP gain from Independent		Swing		

=== Assembly Election 2022 ===
2022 Himachal Pradesh Legislative Assembly election: Hamirpur
Party	Candidate	Votes	%	±%
Independent	Ashish Sharma	25,916	47.09	New
INC	Dr. Pushpinder Verma	13,017	23.65	▼14.32
BJP	Narinder Thakur	12,794	23.25	▼29.47
Independent	Naresh Kumar Darji	1,217	2.21	New
CPI(M)	Dr. Kashmir Singh Thakur	627	1.14	▼3.75
Independent	Ashish Kumar	557	1.01	New
AAP	Sushil Kumar Surroch	298	0.54	New
NOTA	Nota	246	0.45	▼0.08
Rashtriya Devbhumi Party	Abhinay Bhardwaj	231	0.42	New
BSP	Praveen Kumar Kaushal	136	0.25	New
Margin of victory		12,899	23.44	▲8.69
Turnout		55,039	71.81	▲1.18
Registered electors		76,646		▲10.37
Independent gain from BJP		Swing	▼5.63	

=== Assembly Election 2017 ===
2017 Himachal Pradesh Legislative Assembly election: Hamirpur
Party	Candidate	Votes	%	±%
BJP	Narinder Thakur	25,854	52.71	▼4.72
INC	Kuldeep Singh Pathania	18,623	37.97	▲1.43
CPI(M)	Anil Mankotia	2,398	4.89	▲1.82
Independent	Kamal Pathania	509	1.04	New
NOTA	None of the Above	259	0.53	New
Margin of victory		7,231	14.74	▼6.15
Turnout		49,047	70.63	▲3.21
Registered electors		69,444		▲5.18
BJP hold		Swing	▼4.72	

=== Assembly Election 2012 ===
2012 Himachal Pradesh Legislative Assembly election: Hamirpur
Party	Candidate	Votes	%	±%
BJP	Prem Kumar Dhumal	25,567	57.43	▲1.98
INC	Narinder Thakur	16,265	36.54	▼4.28
CPI(M)	Anil Mankotia	1,368	3.07	New
Himachal Swabhiman Party	Avneesh Sharma	458	1.03	New
BSP	Vipat Raj	274	0.62	▼0.85
Margin of victory		9,302	20.90	▲6.26
Turnout		44,515	67.42	▲2.20
Registered electors		66,025		▼9.48
BJP hold		Swing	▲1.98	

=== Assembly Election 2007 ===
2007 Himachal Pradesh Legislative Assembly election: Hamirpur
Party	Candidate	Votes	%	±%
BJP	Urmil Thakur	26,378	55.45	▲25.52
INC	Anita Verma	19,417	40.82	▼3.91
BSP	Parveen Thakur	699	1.47	New
Independent	Squadron Leader Brij Lal Dhiman	523	1.10	New
CPI	Vipat Raj	273	0.57	New
LJP	Hardyal Singh Phul	259	0.54	New
Margin of victory		6,961	14.63	▼0.16
Turnout		47,570	65.22	▼5.37
Registered electors		72,940		▲10.98
BJP gain from INC		Swing	▲10.72	

=== Assembly Election 2003 ===
2003 Himachal Pradesh Legislative Assembly election: Hamirpur
Party	Candidate	Votes	%	±%
INC	Anita Verma	20,749	44.73	▲1.61
BJP	Urmil Thakur	13,884	29.93	▼24.21
Independent	Narinder Thakur	10,290	22.18	New
Independent	Naresh Kumar Darji	985	2.12	New
HVC	Sita Ram	483	1.04	▼0.21
Margin of victory		6,865	14.80	▲3.77
Turnout		46,391	70.60	▲1.92
Registered electors		65,723		▲18.74
INC gain from BJP		Swing	▼9.41	

=== Assembly Election 1998 ===
1998 Himachal Pradesh Legislative Assembly election: Hamirpur
Party	Candidate	Votes	%	±%
BJP	Urmil Thakur	20,577	54.14	New
INC	Anita Verma	16,387	43.11	New
HVC	Deepak Sharma	474	1.25	New
BSP	Prem Chand Azad	414	1.09	New
Margin of victory		4,190	11.02	
Turnout		38,010	69.33	
Registered electors		55,352		
BJP gain from INC		Swing		

=== Assembly By-election 1994 ===
1994 Himachal Pradesh Legislative Assembly by-election : Hamirpur
Party	Candidate	Votes	%	±%
INC	Anita Verma	17,955		
BJP	Narinder Thakur	17,262		
Margin of victory		693		
INC gain from BJP		Swing		

=== Assembly Election 1993 ===
1993 Himachal Pradesh Legislative Assembly election: Hamirpur
Party	Candidate	Votes	%	±%
BJP	Jagdev Chand	17,559	50.04	▼10.77
INC	Anita Verma	16,413	46.77	New
CPI(M)	Kashmir Singh	696	1.98	New
Margin of victory		1,146	3.27	▼25.86
Turnout		35,093	70.81	▲6.54
Registered electors		49,919		▲4.31
BJP hold		Swing		

=== Assembly Election 1990 ===
1990 Himachal Pradesh Legislative Assembly election: Hamirpur
Party	Candidate	Votes	%	±%
BJP	Jagdev Chand	18,554	60.81	▲8.10
Independent	Anita Verma	9,667	31.68	New
Independent	Kashmir Singh Thakur	1,756	5.75	New
Independent	Vaid Kashmir Singh Parmar	282	0.92	New
Independent	Lachho Ram	217	0.71	New
Margin of victory		8,887	29.13	▲23.06
Turnout		30,513	64.46	▼4.67
Registered electors		47,856		▲35.34
BJP hold		Swing	▲8.10	

=== Assembly Election 1985 ===
1985 Himachal Pradesh Legislative Assembly election: Hamirpur
Party	Candidate	Votes	%	±%
BJP	Jagdev Chand	12,753	52.70	▼10.55
INC	Bidhi Chand	11,286	46.64	▲12.30
Independent	Kashmir Singh Parmar	158	0.65	New
Margin of victory		1,467	6.06	▼22.85
Turnout		24,197	69.01	▼1.13
Registered electors		35,361		▲7.50
BJP hold		Swing	▼10.55	

=== Assembly Election 1982 ===
1982 Himachal Pradesh Legislative Assembly election: Hamirpur
Party	Candidate	Votes	%	±%
BJP	Jagdev Chand	14,471	63.25	New
INC	Babu Ram	7,857	34.34	▼4.68
CPI	Puran Singh	485	2.12	New
Margin of victory		6,614	28.91	▲13.52
Turnout		22,879	70.45	▲10.44
Registered electors		32,893		▲13.51
BJP gain from JP		Swing	▲8.84	

=== Assembly Election 1977 ===
1977 Himachal Pradesh Legislative Assembly election: Hamirpur
Party	Candidate	Votes	%	±%
JP	Jagdev Chand	9,322	54.41	New
INC	Ramesh Chand Verma	6,686	39.03	▼11.08
Independent	Roop Singh Phool	702	4.10	New
Independent	Madho Ram Singh	422	2.46	New
Margin of victory		2,636	15.39	▲7.46
Turnout		17,132	59.94	▲6.66
Registered electors		28,979		▲7.41
JP gain from INC		Swing	▲4.31	

=== Assembly Election 1972 ===
1972 Himachal Pradesh Legislative Assembly election: Hamirpur
Party	Candidate	Votes	%	±%
INC	Ramesh Chand Verma	7,092	50.10	▲13.22
ABJS	Jagdev Chand	5,970	42.18	▼9.19
Independent	Rattan Chand	577	4.08	New
Independent	Parmodh Singh	302	2.13	New
INC(O)	Rumesh	214	1.51	New
Margin of victory		1,122	7.93	▼6.56
Turnout		14,155	54.08	▲4.05
Registered electors		26,981		▲7.12
INC gain from ABJS		Swing	▼1.27	

=== Assembly Election 1967 ===
1967 Himachal Pradesh Legislative Assembly election: Hamirpur
Party	Candidate	Votes	%	±%
ABJS	K. Ram	6,264	51.37	New
INC	B. Dev	4,498	36.89	New
Independent	R. Chand	580	4.76	New
Independent	G. Rai	436	3.58	New
Independent	B. Dass	416	3.41	New
Margin of victory		1,766	14.48	
Turnout		12,194	51.64	
Registered electors		25,187		
ABJS win (new seat)				

== See also ==
- List of constituencies of Himachal Pradesh Legislative Assembly
- Hamirpur district, Himachal Pradesh
