= Baroha =

Baroha is a village in the Hamirpur District of north Indian state Himachal Pradesh which came into the spotlight in the year 1997 due to a major truck accident killing 71 members on their way to attend a marriage party. Ten other people were injured as the truck carrying them fell into a 250-ft-deep gorge near Gasota.

Baroha is 4km from district headquarters on Hamirpur Jahu road.

The famous Bhasango Mahadev temple is located on the south east of the village which is approachable by car road. The temple have shivling which are appeared from the land naturally. People of the village worship in the temple daily. Every year two times on janmashtami and shivratri people of the village celebrate the day by organising bhandara. The other name of the temple is स्वयं भू प्रकट भसाँगो महादेव मन्दिर।
