= Lambloo =

- Village
- Interactive map of Lambloo
- Country: India
- State: Himachal Pradesh
- District: Hamirpur
- Time zone: UTC+5:30 (IST)
- Postal Index Number: 305623

Lambloo is a town situated in Hamirpur, Himachal Pradesh, India. It is 10 km away from the Hamirpur District famous for ShaniDev temple which attracts pilgrims from nearby places, particularly on weekend days. A famous Shiva temple is situated in the nearby village Gasota while reaching Lambloo from the district headquarters.
