= Barsar Assembly constituency =

Legislative Assembly constituency in Himachal Pradesh State, India

Coordinates: 31.53°N 76.46°E

Barsar
- Constituency No. 39 for the Himachal Pradesh Legislative Assembly

Constituency details
- Country: India
- Region: North India
- State: Himachal Pradesh
- District: Hamirpur
- Lok Sabha constituency: Hamirpur
- Established: 2008
- Total electors: 87,505
- Reservation: None

Member of Legislative Assembly
- 14th Himachal Pradesh Legislative Assembly
- Incumbent Inder Dutt Lakhanpal
- Party: Bharatiya Janata Party
- Elected year: 2024

Barsar Assembly constituency is one of the 68 constituencies in the Himachal Pradesh Legislative Assembly of Himachal Pradesh a northern state of India. Barsar is also part of Hamirpur, Himachal Pradesh Lok Sabha constituency.

== Member of Legislative Assembly ==
Year	Member	Picture	Party
2012	Inder Dutt Lakhanpal		Indian National Congress
2017	Inder Dutt Lakhanpal		Indian National Congress
2022	Inder Dutt Lakhanpal		Indian National Congress
2024 *	Inder Dutt Lakhanpal		Bharatiya Janata Party

- By-Election

Before the Delimitation Barsar Assembly constituency was known as Nadaunta Assembly constituency.

== Election results ==
=== 2024 by-election ===
Himanchal Pradesh Legislative Assembly by-election 2024: Barsar
Party	Candidate	Votes	%	±%
BJP	Inder Dutt Lakhanpal	33,086	51.04%	▲24.81
INC	Subhash Chand	30,961	47.76%	▼0.40
NOTA	None of the Above	323	0.5%	▲0.03
Majority		2,125	3.28%	
Turnout			50%	
BJP gain from INC		Swing		

=== Assembly Election 2022 ===
2022 Himachal Pradesh Legislative Assembly election: Barsar
Party	Candidate	Votes	%	±%
INC	Inder Dutt Lakhanpal	30,293	48.16%	▲4.05
BJP	Maya Sharma	16,501	26.23%	▼17.12
Independent	Sanjeev Kumar	15,252	24.25%	New
Margin of victory		13,792	21.92%	▲21.17
Turnout		62,907	71.89%	▼0.25
Registered electors		87,505		▲8.41
INC hold		Swing	▲4.05	

=== Assembly Election 2017 ===
2017 Himachal Pradesh Legislative Assembly election: Barsar
Party	Candidate	Votes	%	±%
INC	Inder Dutt Lakhanpal	25,679	44.10%	▼6.78
BJP	Baldev Sharma	25,240	43.35%	▼2.34
Independent	Sita Ram Bhardwaj	5,181	8.90%	New
NOTA	None of the Above	464	0.80%	New
Margin of victory		439	0.75%	▼4.44
Turnout		58,226	72.14%	▲4.43
Registered electors		80,717		▲6.79
INC hold		Swing	▼6.78	

=== Assembly Election 2012 ===
2012 Himachal Pradesh Legislative Assembly election: Barsar
Party	Candidate	Votes	%	±%
INC	Inder Dutt Lakhanpal	26,041	50.89%	New
BJP	Baldev Sharma	23,383	45.69%	New
HLC	Satish Kumar	538	1.05%	New
Independent	Battan Singh	414	0.81%	New
BSP	Om Prakash Jaswal	322	0.63%	New
Margin of victory		2,658	5.19%	
Turnout		51,174	67.71%	
Registered electors		75,582		
INC win (new seat)				

== See also ==
- Barsar
- Hamirpur district, Himachal Pradesh
- List of constituencies of Himachal Pradesh Legislative Assembly
