= Urmil Thakur =

Indian politician

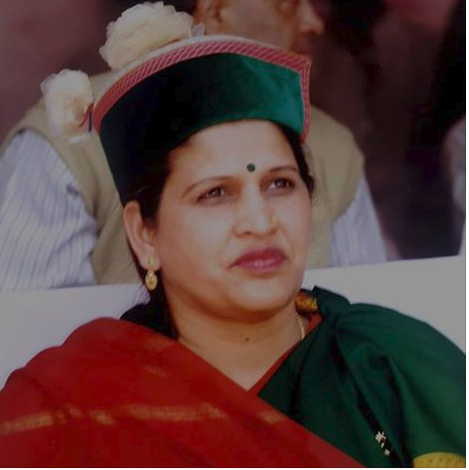

Personal details
- Born: 1 April 1958 (age 68)
- Spouse: Bhupinder Singh Thakur
- Children: 3
- Profession: Political Worker

Smt. Urmil Thakur (born 1 April 1958) is an Indian politician from Hamirpur, Himachal Pradesh.

She was 1st elected as a BDC Member, Panchayat Samiti, Sujanpur, 1995, at the same time Zila Parishad member in 1995, Hamirpur, Himachal Pradesh, 1995–98, elected to State Assembly in 1998, Parliamentary Secretary in Himachal Pradesh Government, 1998–2003, again elected to State Assembly In 2007.

== Personal life ==
Smt. Urmil Thakur was born on 1 April 1958. Her father was Late Sh. Roop Singh Rana. She earned her Bachelor of Arts (B.A.) followed by B.Ed. She married Sh. Bhupinder Singh Thakur, a Govt. Officer and gave birth to two sons & a daughter. Being the elder daughter-in-law of stalwart leader Sh. Jagdev Chand Thakur of Bharatiya Janata Party from Himachal Pradesh, she pursued her political path with BJP. She represented Hamirpur Assembly seat twice. Unfortunately, in 2021 her husband Sh. Bhupinder Singh died after prolonged illness.

== Political career ==
Smt. Urmil Thakur became BDC and Zilla Parishad member (Majority portion outside Hamirpur constituency) at the same time in 1995 as she contested both & won both. That year majority of the seats were won by INC. She was the candidate for the post of Zilla parishad chairman from BJP. Voting took place & shockingly BJP and INC ended up in a tie. But the result went in favor of INC as result was declared on the basis of toss occurred in a closed door room.
In 1998 Urmil Thakur contested from Hamirpur Assembly constituency and won. She was appointed Chief Parliamentary Secretary (CPS) in H.P. Govt., with independent charge of Information & Broadcasting Department. Later the department was shifted to Department of Health.

In 2003 she lost to Smt. Anita Verma (INC) as her younger brother in law Sh. Narinder Thakur (Independent) also contested the same elections and made a significant dent in her vote share.

In 2007 she was again elected from Hamirpur Constituency as an MLA & defeated Smt. Anita Verma (National President INC Mahila Congress). In 2012 she was abruptly shifted to newly formed Sujanpur constituency, as Sh. P. K. Dhumal who was declared as CM face has chosen Hamirpur. Both major parties BJP and INC and their respective candidates lost Sujanpur Assembly. Election was won by Sh. Rajinder Rana (Independent) who was considered as close ally of Sh. P. K. Dhumal at that time. Ironically Sh. Rajinder Rana defeated Sh. P. K. Dhumal (CM candidate) from same Sunjanpur seat in 2017 assembly elections.

Smt. Urmil Thakur quit BJP & joined Indian National Congress on 12 April 2014. She cited several reasons for quitting BJP namely shifting to newly formed Assembly Constituency on eleventh hour in 2012 elections. Then she was made to face defeat by the independent candidate Sh. Rajinder Rana, the script of which was already written. Later in 2014 Sujanpur by-election BJP awarded the ticket to Sh. Narender Thakur who had recently shifted to BJP from INC which disheartened her as she felt marginalized in her own party and eventfully she took the decision to quit BJP.

Foreseeing the weakening of Hamirpur fort of BJP, recently the national level BJP intervened and she is again made to join BJP in the presence of BJP State President Shri Suresh Kashyap & BJP State Incharge Shri Avinash Rai Khanna.

== Political positions ==
1. National Council Member BJP
2. Prabhari, BJP Mahila Morcha J&K
3. National BJP Mahila Morcha Member
4. State BJP Mahila Morcha Gen. Sec.
5. Distt. President BJP, Hamirpur
