= Hamirpur, Himachal Pradesh Lok Sabha constituency =

Lok Sabha constituency in Himachal Pradesh

Coordinates: 31.7°N 76.5°E

Hamirpur HP-3
- Lok Sabha constituency
- Interactive Map Outlining Hamirpur Lok Sabha constituency

Constituency details
- Country: India
- Region: North India
- State: Himachal Pradesh
- Assembly constituencies: 17: Dehra, Jaswan-Pragpur, Dharampur, Bhoranj, Sujanpur, Hamirpur, Barsar, Nadaun, Chintpurni, Gagret, Haroli, Una, Kutlehar, Jhanduta, Ghumarwin, Bilaspur and Sri Naina Deviji
- Established: 1953
- Reservation: None

Member of Parliament
- 18th Lok Sabha
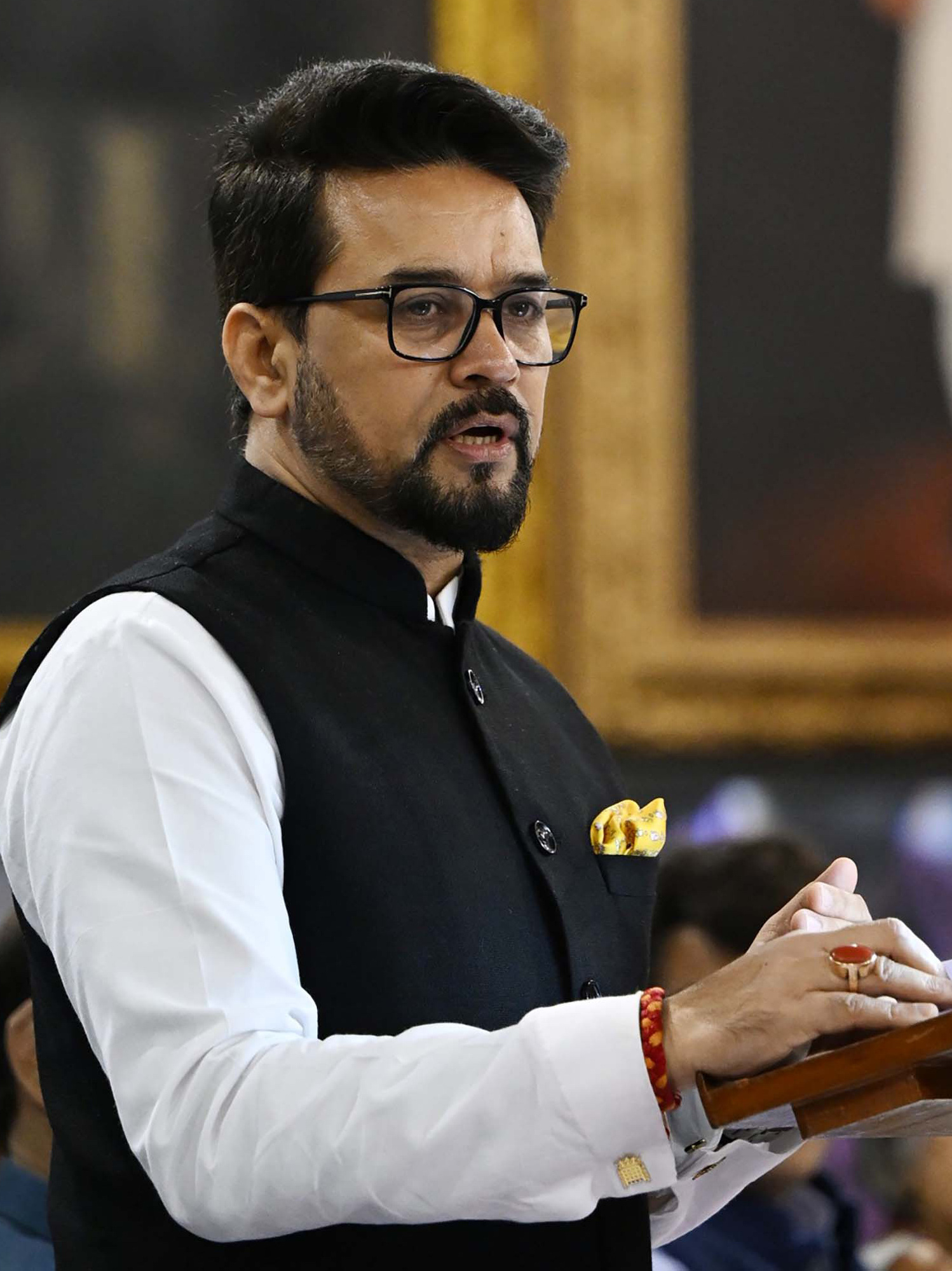
- Incumbent Anurag Thakur
- Party: BJP
- Alliance: NDA
- Elected year: 2024

Hamirpur Lok Sabha constituency is one of the four Lok Sabha (parliamentary) constituencies in Himachal Pradesh state in northern India.

== Assembly segments ==
Hamirpur Lok Sabha constituency presently comprises the following 17 Vidhan Sabha (legislative assembly) segments:

No	Name	District	Member	Party	2024 Lead
10	Dehra	Kangra	Kamlesh Thakur	INC	BJP
11	Jaswan-Pragpur	Kangra	Bikram Singh	BJP	BJP
32	Dharampur	Mandi	Chander Shekhar Thakur	INC	BJP
36	Bhoranj (SC)	Hamirpur	Suresh Kumar	INC	BJP
37	Sujanpur	Hamirpur	Ranjit Singh	INC	BJP
38	Hamirpur	Hamirpur	Ashish Sharma	BJP	BJP
39	Barsar	Hamirpur	Inder Dutt Lakhanpal	BJP	BJP
40	Nadaun	Hamirpur	Sukhvinder Singh Sukhu	INC	BJP
41	Chintpurni (SC)	Una	Sudarshan Singh Babloo	INC	BJP
42	Gagret	Una	Rakesh Kalia	INC	BJP
43	Haroli	Una	Mukesh Agnihotri	INC	INC
44	Una	Una	Satpal Singh Satti	BJP	BJP
45	Kutlehar	Una	Vivek Sharma	INC	BJP
46	Jhanduta (SC)	Bilaspur	Jeet Ram Katwal	BJP	BJP
47	Ghumarwin	Bilaspur	Rajesh Dharmani	INC	BJP
48	Bilaspur	Bilaspur	Trilok Jamwal	BJP	BJP
49	Sri Naina Deviji	Bilaspur	Randhir Sharma	BJP	BJP

== Members of Parliament ==
Year	Name	Party
1952	Anand Chand	Independent
1967	Prem Chand Verma	Indian National Congress
1971	Narain Chand	Indian National Congress
1977	Thakur Ranjit Singh	Janata Party
1980	Narain Chand	Indian National Congress
1984	Narain Chand	Indian National Congress
1989	Prem Kumar Dhumal	Bharatiya Janata Party
1991	Prem Kumar Dhumal	Bharatiya Janata Party
1996	Vikram Singh	Indian National Congress
1998	Suresh Chandel	Bharatiya Janata Party
1999	Suresh Chandel	Bharatiya Janata Party
2004	Suresh Chandel	Bharatiya Janata Party
2007^	Prem Kumar Dhumal	Bharatiya Janata Party
2008^	Anurag Thakur	Bharatiya Janata Party
2009	Anurag Thakur	Bharatiya Janata Party
2014	Anurag Thakur	Bharatiya Janata Party
2019	Anurag Thakur	Bharatiya Janata Party
2024	Anurag Thakur	Bharatiya Janata Party

== Election results ==
=== 2024 ===
2024 Indian general election: Hamirpur
Party	Candidate	Votes	%	±%
BJP	Anurag Thakur	607,068	57.97	▼11.07
INC	Satpal Raizada	4,24,711	40.55	▲11.92
NOTA	None of the above	5,178	0.59	
Majority		1,82,357	17.42	
Turnout		10,52,398	72.28	
BJP hold		Swing		

=== 2019 ===
2019 Indian general elections: Hamirpur
Party	Candidate	Votes	%	±%
BJP	Anurag Singh Thakur	682,692	69.04	▲15.43
INC	Ram Lal Thakur	2,83,120	28.63	▼13.20
NOTA	None of the Above	8,026	0.81	▲0.04
Majority		3,99,572	40.41	
Turnout		9,92,087	72.83	
BJP hold		Swing		

=== 2014 ===
2014 Indian general elections: Hamirpur
Party	Candidate	Votes	%	±%
BJP	Anurag Singh Thakur	448,035	53.61	▲0.14
INC	Rajender Singh Rana	3,49,632	41.83	▼1.23
AAP	Kamal Kanta Batra	15,329	1.83	New
NOTA	None of the above	6,473	0.77	N/A
Majority		98,403	11.78	▲1.37
Turnout		8,35,205	66.94	
BJP hold		Swing	▲0.14	

=== 2009 ===
2009 Indian general elections: Hamirpur
Party	Candidate	Votes	%	±%
BJP	Anurag Singh Thakur	373,598	53.47	▼10.47
INC	Narender Thakur	3,00,866	43.06	▲8.96
BSP	Mangat Ram Sharma	11,774	1.69	▲0.24
Majority		72,732	10.41	▲10.16
Turnout		6,98,777	58.85	
BJP hold		Swing		

=== 2008 by-election ===
Bye Election, 2008: Hamirpur
Party	Candidate	Votes	%	±%
BJP	Anurag Singh Thakur	374,339	63.94	▲9.62
INC	Madan Lal	1,99,673	34.10	▼8.84
Independent	Amin Chand	6,484	1.10	New
Majority		1,74,666	29.84	▲18.46
Turnout		5,85,434	49.91	▼10.00
BJP hold		Swing		

=== 2007 by-election ===
Bye Election, 2007: Hamirpur
Party	Candidate	Votes	%	±%
BJP	Prem Kumar Dhumal	382,128	54.32	
INC	Thakur Ram Lal	3,02,069	42.94	
Independent	Subhash Chand Sharma	8,959	1.27	
Majority		80,059	11.38	
Turnout		7,04,199	59.91	
BJP hold		Swing		

== See also ==
- Hamirpur district
- List of constituencies of the Lok Sabha
