= Barsar =

- Town
- Location in Himachal Pradesh, India Barsar (India)
- Coordinates: 31°31′35″N 76°27′45″E
- Country: India
- State: Himachal Pradesh
- District: Hamirpur

Government
  - Body: Panchayat

Population (2011)
  - Total: 3,990

Languages
  - Official: Hindi
  - Native: Pahari
- Time zone: UTC+5:30 (IST)
- PIN: 174305
- Telephone code: 01972
- Vehicle registration: HP-21
- Nearest cities: Hamirpur, Una
- Lok Sabha constituency: Hamirpur
- Civic agency: Panchayat
- Climate: Hot and humid. (Köppen)
- Avg. summer temperature: 28 °C (82 °F)
- Avg. winter temperature: 2 °C (36 °F)

Barsar is a town in the Hamirpur district of Himachal Pradesh in India. Located primarily on the foothills of the western Shivalik Range, on National Highway 503A, it is a major business and educational hub in the district.

== Barsar Clan ==
In the northern part of India, the Barsar (or Bersal) is a Rajput clan whose members ruled several states. The Barsars claim descent from the mythical Suryavansha (Solar dynasty). The town was founded by a Rajput prince as a princely state, named for the Barsar clan.

== Population ==
As of 2011, the town had a population of 3390, of which 1762 were male and 1628 were female, according to the Census of India. The town had 360 children aged 0–6, comprising 10.62% of the total population. The average sex ratio was 924, lower than 972 across Himachal Pradesh. The child sex ratio for Barsar as per the census was 967, higher than the state average of 909.

According to the 2011 census, Barsar had a literacy rate of 88.91% compared to 82.80% across Himachal Pradesh. The male literacy rate was 92.65% while the female literacy rate was 84.84%.

== Education ==
Govt. Degree College Barsar is the main institute for higher education.

== Location and transport ==
Barsar overlooks the Gobind Sagar lake to the south west and the Dhauladhar mountain range to the north. The nearest cities are Hamirpur, Una and Bilaspur in Himachal Pradesh while the nearest major city is Chandigarh. The nearest broad-gauge railway station is Una Railway Station, while Gaggal Airport is the closest airport for the town followed by Mohali International Airport Chandigarh.

Barsar is the main stop for pilgrims and tourists before Baba Balak Nath Temple in Deotsidh.
