= Neri, India =

Village in Himachal Pradesh, India

Coordinates: 31.679°N 76.486°E

Neri is a village in the Hamirpur District of north Indian state Himachal Pradesh. Thakur Ram Singh Itihas Sodh Sansthan is situated here. College of Horticulture & Forestry (CoH&F) - Dr. YSP University of Horticulture and Forestry is also located here.
