= Jagdev Chand =

Thakur Jagdev Chand
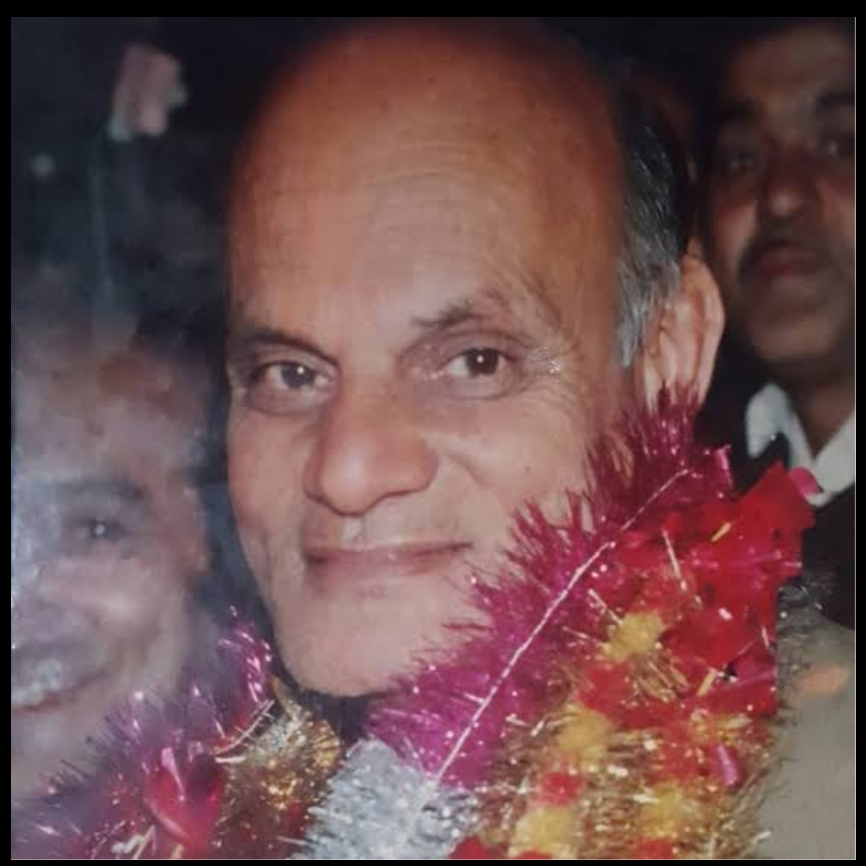
- Born: Jagdev; 1923; Hamirpur, Himachal Pradesh, India
- Died: 1993 (aged 69–70); Regional Hospital Hamirpur (now Dr. Radhakrishnan Government Medical College), Himachal Pradesh, India
- Known for: MLA Hamirpur
- Political party: Bharatiya Janata Party
- Children: Narinder Thakur

Thakur Jagdev Chand was a stalwart leader of Bharatiya Janata Party from Himachal Pradesh, India. He was elected to Himachal Pradesh Legislative Assembly from Hamirpur and served as cabinet minister in Government of Himachal Pradesh. He was elected five times uninterrupted. He died in 1993, soon after his fifth victory.

During his first term as an MLA and a Cabinet Minister in state government in June 1977, he was given portfolio of Public Transport. He was the one who pioneered the idea of introducing Passenger insurance scheme. He was astonished to know that surviving victims after a bus accident (this was first accident during his term as Cabinet Minister) were only given Rs 2000. Passenger insurance scheme ensured that survivors will get at least Rs 25000 in 1977. Amount was then further revised to higher values by successive governments. It was under his tenure when Himachal Road Transport Corporation made profit for the first time.

For a leader who was well respected by masses and is still remembered for his contribution, state government named Sujanpur degree college after him, Thakur Jagdev Chand Memorial Government College. Hamirpur town hall is also named after Late Thakur Jagdev Chand. RSS also opened a History research institute based in Neri which was also named after him.
