= Gasota =

Coordinates: 31.641°N 76.578°E

- Village
- Interactive map of Gasota
- Country: India
- State: Himachal Pradesh
- District: Hamirpur
- Time zone: UTC+5:30 (IST)
- Postal Index Number: 177001

Gasota is a village located in the north Indian state of Himachal Pradesh, in the Hamirpur district. It is known for its ancient temple dedicated to the Hindu deity Shiva. other prominent villages nearby are Lambloo and Baroha. According to a 2011 census, there are 541 residents. The temple dedicated to Lord Shiva which is around nine kilometres from Hamirpur city. This temple is believed to be more than 400 years old. As per a legend, a farmer was ploughing his field in Gasota and suddenly his plough collided with a large stone which was later found to be a Shiva lingum. Then as the Lingam was very huge to be moved to another place, Shiva temple was constructed in the very place itself which is now known as Gasota Mahadev temple. A lot of devotees visit the temple throughout the year particularly during Shivaratri. The temple has a very pleasing location as it is stands between two rivulets which further enhance the overall beauty of the temple. Gasota Mahadev temple is also very popular for a week long ‘Cattle fair’ that is organised every year on the first Monday of Jayeshtha Mahina (Month) which usually comes on mid of May. This fair has both religious and commercial significance as a lot of people from Himachal Pradesh and nearby states come here during this fair to take blessings from Lord Shiva and for cattle trading.
