= Divya Himachal =

Indian newspaper

- Type: Daily newspaper
- Format: Broadsheet Divya Himachal Tabloid Himachal This Week
- Owner(s): Divya Himachal Prakashan India Private Limited / Bhanu Dhamija
- Founder(s): Bhanu Dhamija (Chairman and Managing Director )
- Publisher: Anil Soni for Divya Himachal Prakashan India Private Limited
- President: Vipin Kharbanda (2018)
- Editor-in-chief: Anil Soni
- Founded: 29 December 1997
- Language: Hindi English
- Headquarters: Divya Himachal, Kangra-Pathankot Marg, Old Mataur, 176 001., Kangra, Himachal Pradesh, India
- Sister newspapers: Magazines - Aastha(Saturdays), Utsav(Sundays), Competition Review(Wednesdays)
- OCLC number: +911892264713
- Website: www.divyahimachal.com

Divya Himachal (Hindi: Divya Himācala, lit. 'The Divine Himachal') is a Hindi Newspaper of Himachal Pradesh, having circulation in Himachal Pradesh, Punjab, Haryana, Uttarakhand and Chandigarh (UT). The newspaper was launched on 29 December 1997 and now has four editions namely Dharamshala, Shimla, Chandigarh and Punjab. The newspaper has its head office at Matour which also includes the "Samarpan Printers", the printing press from which DH is published. The second printing press was established in Baddi (HP) and became functional on April 1, 2017, extending the reach further. It covers all the areas of Himachal Pradesh with its two editions Dharamshala and Shimla. It is the only newspaper of the state with separate district pullouts that include Mera Kangra, Mera Bilaspur, Mera Shimla, Mera Solan, Mera Una, Mera Sirmour, Mera Kullu, Mera Mandi, Mera Chamba, Mera Kinnor, and Mera Hamirpur.

The Divya Himachal Group is headed by Bhanu Dhamija, who is also the author of the book Why India needs Presidential System that argues for Presidential System for the parliamentarian India. He is the founder and chairman of the Group, which in fact is the largest publishing company in Himachal Pradesh, India. Earlier, in America, Dhamija founded a media company that published trade journals and organized conferences for the magazine publishing industry, becoming in effect a publishers publisher. He was born in Bulandshehar, Uttar Pradesh in 1959, but has lived almost half his life in the United States. After attending Punjab University in Chandigarh, he acquired a postgraduate degree from the Stern School of Business at New York University. He has worked in the financial, computer and media industries in the US and India.

Anil Soni is the editor-in-chief of the group. He is also the director of the Divya Himachal's Premier Events. He has previously worked with several large publication houses of the country including Lokmat and Jan Sandesh.

Divya Himachal Media Group publishes newspapers for the northern Indian state of Himachal Pradesh. Its flagship Hindi Daily, Divya Himachal, is the state's 'most credible' newspaper. Himachal This Week is the state's only English Weekly. The Group began operations in 1997 and is now Himachal's largest media group producing its biggest brands in print, social media, web TV, and events. The combined reach of these media properties exceeds 25 lakh people.
