= Tira Sujanpur =

Sujanpur Tira Sujanpur
- Town
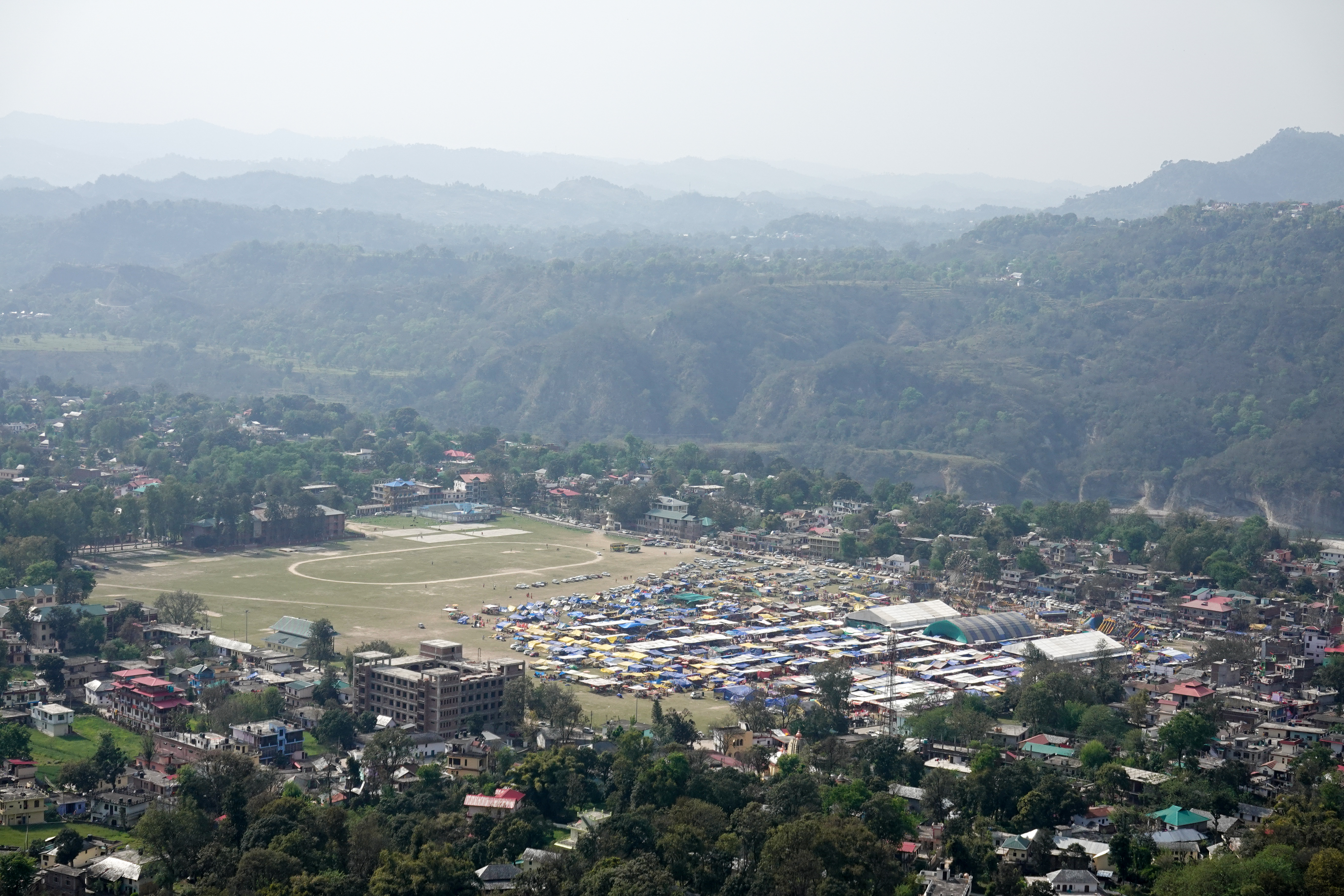
- Chaughan, Tira Sujanpur viewed from Katoch Palace

- Location in Himachal Pradesh, India Sujanpur Tira (Himachal Pradesh)
- Coordinates: 31.83°N 76.50°E
- Country: India
- State: Himachal Pradesh
- District: Hamirpur
- Founder: Raja Abhay Chand

Government
  - Type: Himachal Pradesh
  - Body: municipal council
- Elevation: 562 m (1,844 ft)

Population (2011)
  - Total: 7,943

Languages
  - Official: Hindi
  - Regional: Kangri (Hamirpuri Kangri)
- Time zone: UTC+5:30 (IST)
- PIN: 176110

Tira Sujanpur, also known as Sujanpur Tira or Sujanpur Tihra, is a town and municipal council in the Hamirpur district of Himachal Pradesh. Founded in the 18th century by the Katoch dynasty, the town is located midst the Himalayan foothills on the southern bank of the Beas River. It was one of the centers of Kangra-style miniature paintings (a chitrakala school) and Hindu temples built in an unusual blend of conventional Nagara architecture shrines with Mughal architecture palace, the latter decorated with floral murals of legends from the Ramayana and the Mahabharata.

== History ==
The town was founded as "Sajjanpur" by Raja Sansar Chand Katoch in the 18th century. Over time, it was referred to as Sujanpur. The Katoch dynasty developed it as a capital, adding a fort near it along a Tihra – a strip of the foothills. This led to the current name "Tihra Sujanpur". The king added several Hindu temples, a palace and square-shaped training center for warriors, locally called the "Chougan". It served the needs of its time where an alliance of Sikh and Hindu rulers were prone to plunder raids and invasion from the Mughal governors and Muslim tribes from Afghanistan and northwest Indian subcontinent. With the British rule, a period of relative peace arrived. The town and its historic buildings were damaged by the 1905 Kangra earthquake. After the end of the colonial era, the Chougan evolved into a public square hosting cultural festivals and other public events.

=== Temples of Sujanpur Tira ===
Tira Sujanpur has several historic temples, all traced to 18th-century or afterwards. Sansar Chand Katoch built the Narvardeshwar temple (Shiva), the Murlimanohar temple (Krishna, Vishnu), and the Chamundi Devi temple (Shakti, a fierce form of the Hindu war goddess). The third group at Thakardwara and inside the palace was sponsored by his wife Pransani Devi-Suketi, a patron of arts. These are unusual, as some shrines include elements of Mughal architecture while innovating over the core square and circle principles of the Hindu sacred architecture. The Katoch dynasty championed the conventional north Indian Nagara architecture as well, thus creating a complex where the ancient traditions were hosted with a palatial temple that incorporated influences from the late Indo-Saracenic architecture.

The town and nearby region were one of the centers of arts and created many Kangra-style miniature paintings. This influential was incorporated in its Hindu temples where the pillars and ceilings have floral decorations that frame murals. These depict scenes of historic Hindu legends. Further, both iconic (anthropomorphic Shiva and Parvati) and aniconic (Shiva linga) statues were included in the Shaiva, Vaishnava and Shakti temples.

== Climate and geographical location ==
The climate varies with hot summers and cold winters, but moderated by its Himalayan foothills location and being on the banks of Beas River. The temperature varies from 38 °C (100 °F) in the summer, to almost 0 °C (32 °F) in the winter. In the winter there are often areas of low-lying clouds.

Sujanpur is connected by road to all of the major towns in Himachal Pradesh, as well as the rest of the country. Its neighboring towns include Hamirpur, Palampur, Joginder Nagar, and Dharamshala. There are many bus connections to surrounding towns and cities. The nearest railway station is in Maranda.

About three decades ago, a Sainik School was opened in the town.

== Demographics ==
As per the 2011 Census of India, the Tira Sujanpur Municipal Council had a population of 7,943, of which 4,262 were male, and 3,681 were female. The literacy rate of Tira Sujanpur City was 91.73%, higher than the state average of 82.80%.

== Gallery ==
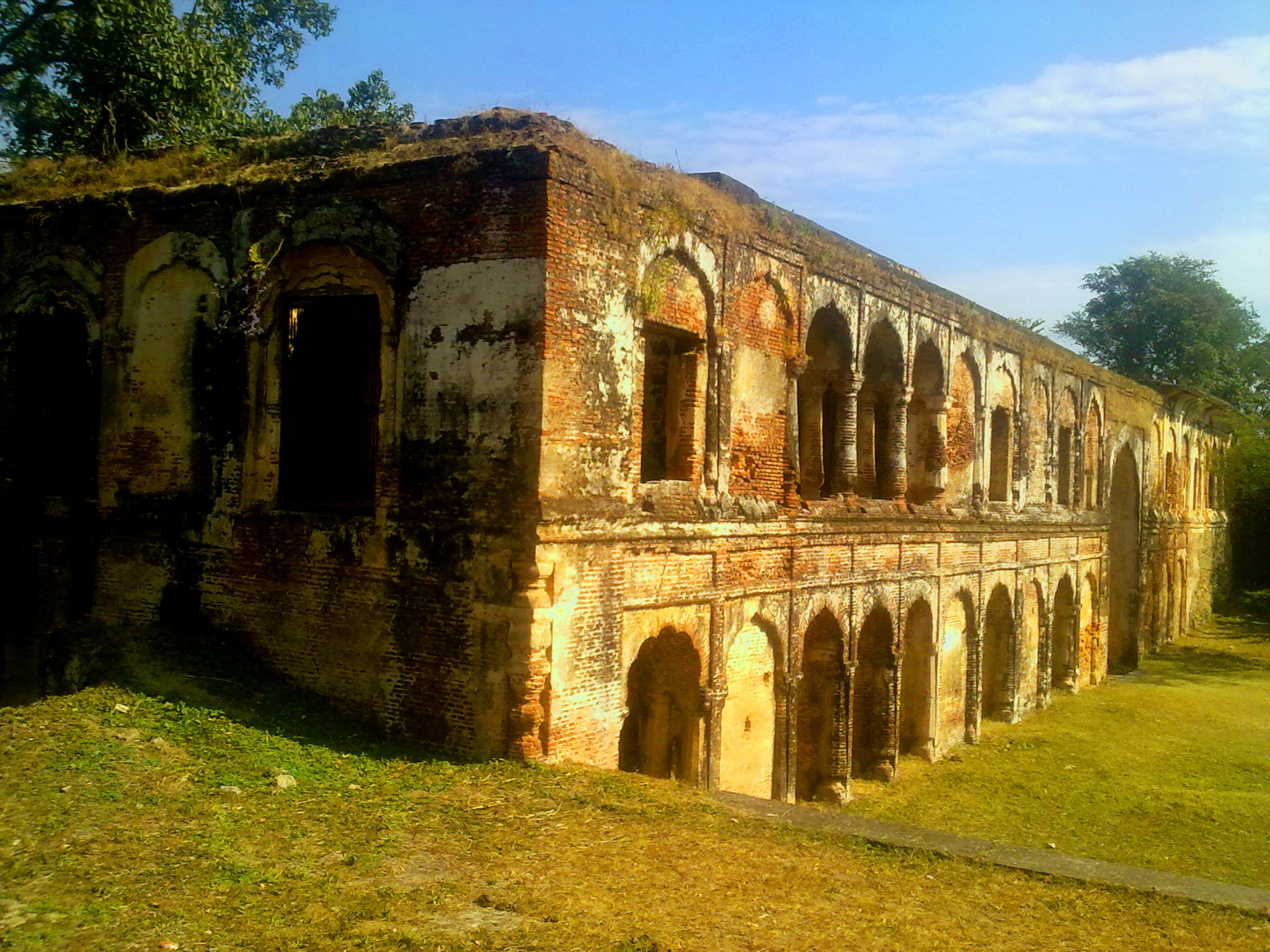
Inner courtyard of Katoch Palace-Fort overlooking Sujanpur Tira

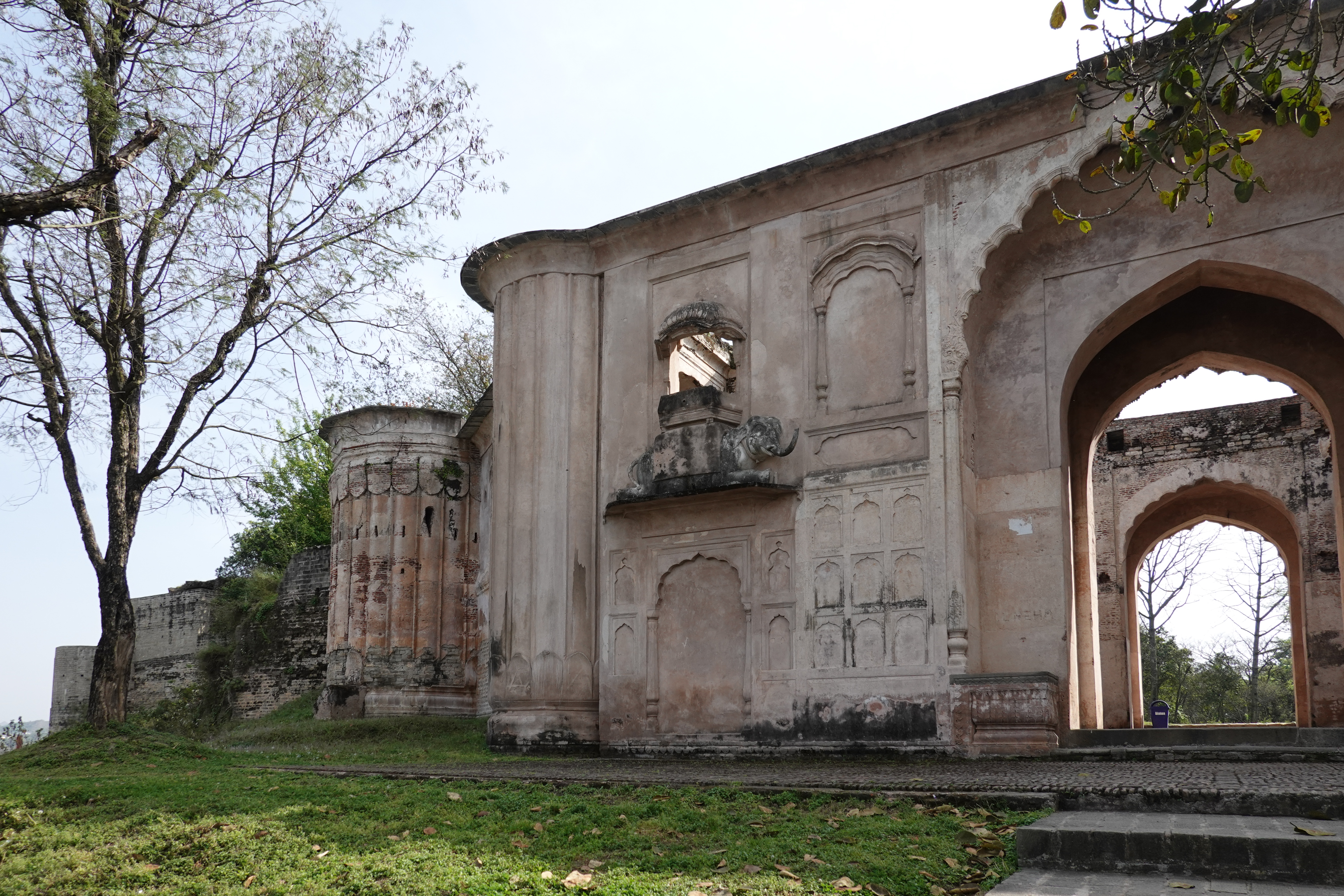
Entrance and outer wall, Katoch Palace-Fort

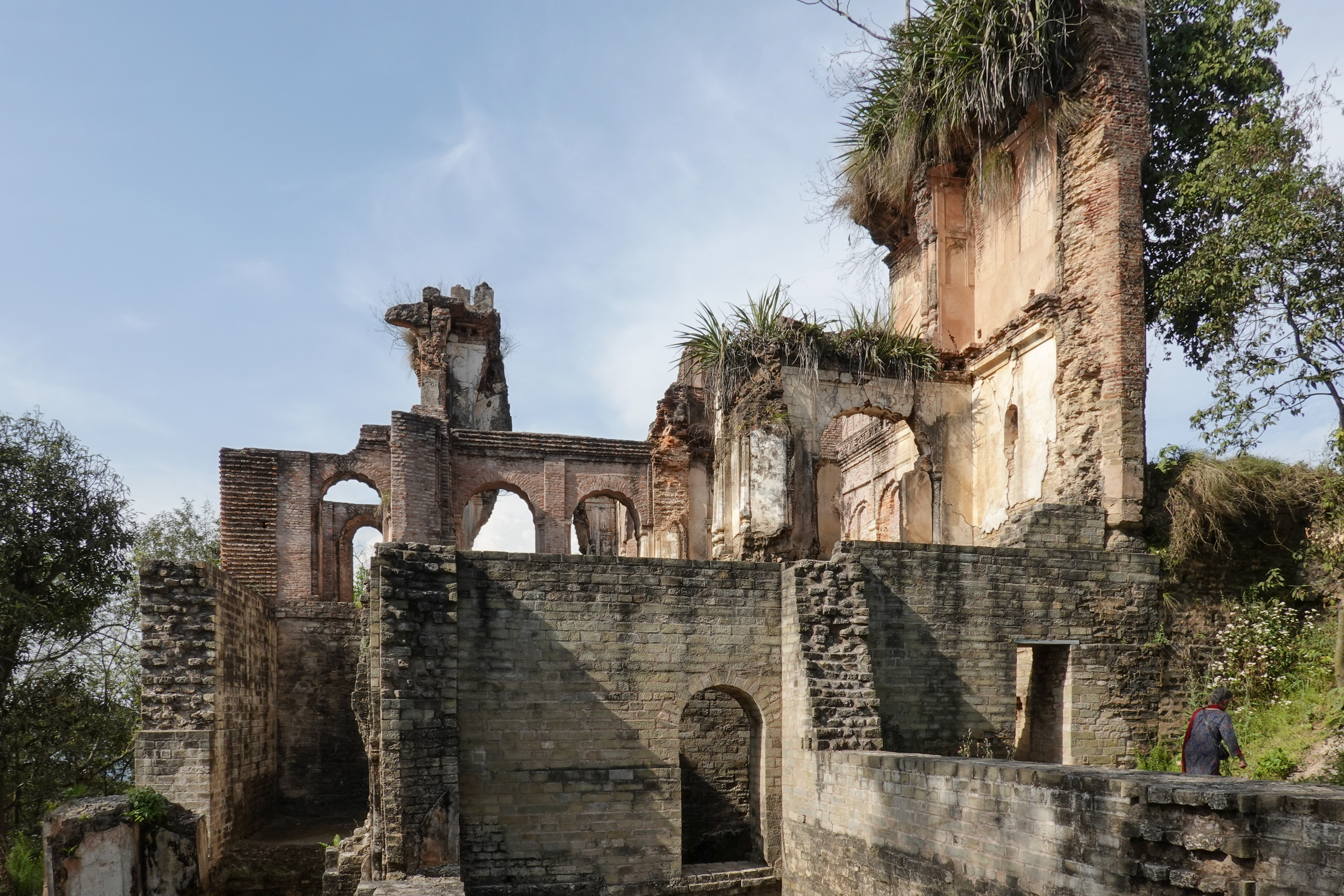
Ruins of interior of Katoch Palace-Fort
