= Ashish Sharma (politician) =

Indian politician

MLA, Himachal Pradesh Legislative Assembly
- Incumbent
- Assumed office 2022

Personal details
- Born: 18 April 1987 (age 39) Hamirpur, Himachal Pradesh
- Party: Bharatiya Janata Party
- Spouse: Swathi Sharma
- Children: 2
- Parent: Ved Parkash Sharma (father)
- Education: Jaypee University of Information Technology

Ashish Sharma (born 18 April 1987) is an Indian politician who is currently serving as a member of the Himachal Pradesh Legislative Assembly from the Hamirpur constituency.

== Early life and education ==
Ashish Sharma was born on April 18, 1987, in Hamirpur, to Aruna Sharma and Ved Parkash Sharma. After Completing his initial education in Hamirpur, he completed his graduation in Electronics and Communication Engineering from Jaypee University of Information Technology.

== Politics ==
Ashish Sharma entered politics in 2020 and won the 2022 Himachal Pradesh Assembly election as an independent politician.

Ashish Sharma who had voted in favour of the BJP candidate in the 2024 Rajya Sabha elections resigned as member of the Himachal Pradesh legislative assembly on 22 March 2024 and later joined in Bharatiya Janata Party in the presence of Himachal Pradesh BJP president Rajiv Bindal and Union Minister Anurag Thakur. He won the by elections from Hamirpur Assembly constituency as a member of the Bharatiya Janata Party.
