= Narinder Thakur =

Indian politician

Narinder Thakur is an Indian politician from the Bharatiya Janata Party and a member of the Himachal Pradesh Legislative Assembly representing the Hamirpur assembly constituency of Himachal Pradesh. He has defeated Kuldeep Singh Pathania of INC by 7231 votes.
