= Hamirpur district, Himachal Pradesh =

District in Himachal Pradesh, India

Hamirpur district
- District of Himachal Pradesh
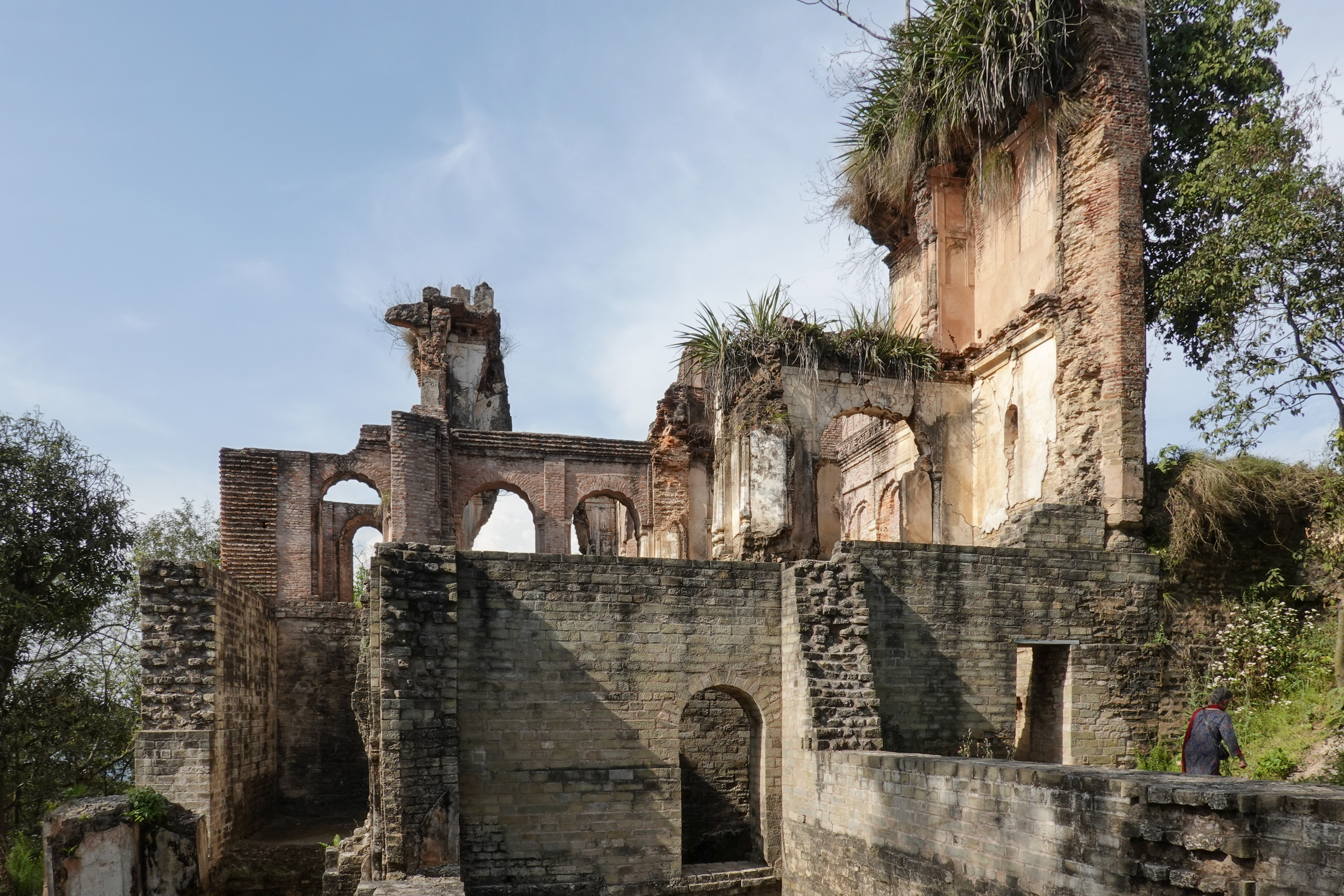
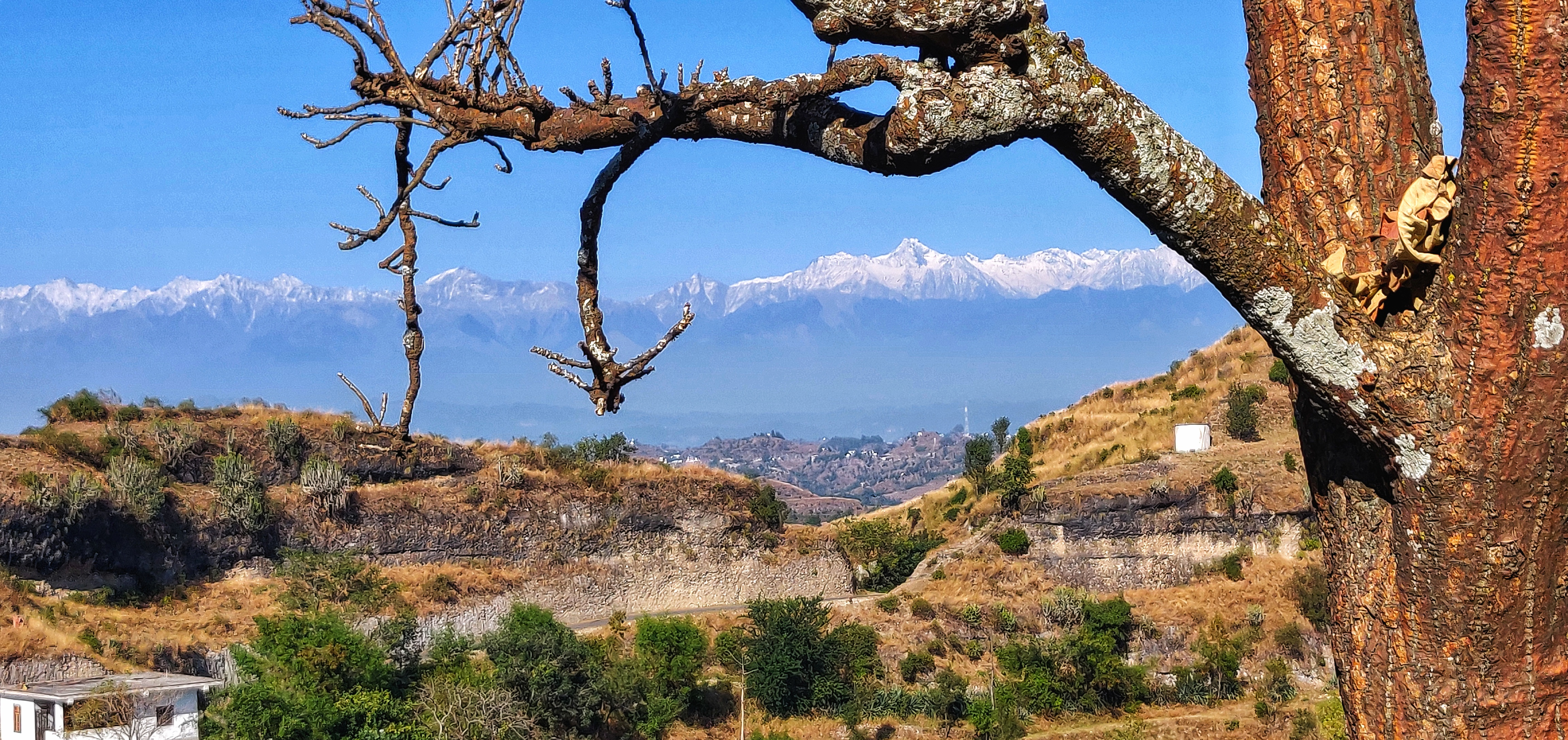
- Top: Katoch Palace, Tira Sujanpur; Bottom: view of mountains from Rangar village
- Interactive map of Hamirpur district
- Coordinates (Hamirpur): 31.6798° N, 76.5026° E
- Country: India
- State: Himachal Pradesh
- Division: Mandi
- Established: 1972
- Headquarters: Hamirpur
- Tehsils: 5+2(Sub-Tehsils)

Government
  - Lok Sabha Constituency: Hamirpur
  - Lok Sabha Member: Anurag Singh Thakur
  - Vidhan Sabha constituencies: Barsar, Hamirpur, Sujanpur, Nadaun, Bhoranj.

Area
  - Total: 1,118 km^{2} (432 sq mi)

Population (2011)
  - Total: 454,768
  - Density: 406.8/km^{2} (1,054/sq mi)

Demographics
  - Literacy: 90%

Languages
  - Official: Hindi
  - Regional: Kangri
- Time zone: UTC+05:30 (IST)
- Vehicle registration: HP-22
- Website: https://hphamirpur.nic.in/

Hamirpur district is one of the constituent districts of Himachal Pradesh, a state in north India. The town of Hamirpur forms the district headquarters. With an area of 1,118 square kilometres or 432 square miles, it is the smallest district of Himachal Pradesh.

== History ==
Carved out from Kangra District in 1972, the history of the Hamirpur District is closely associated with the Katoch dynasty. It was part of the old Jalandhar-Trigarta empire. Panin referred to the people of this kingdom as great warriors and fighters. The Katoch dynasty predominated during the period of Raja Hamir Chand, who ruled from 1700 to 1740 and built the fort at Hamirpur The present town derived its name from this ruler.

== Economy ==
The Army is the largest employer for residents of Hamirpur, who form large bulks of the Dogra Regiment, Jammu and Kashmir Rifles regiment, the Grenadiers, the Rajput regiment, Hodson's Horse and Scinde Horse. Thousand of locals also serve in the Indian Air Force, Indian Navy, and paramilitary forces. The Indian Army conducts an open army rally under the Hamirpur Army recruitment office every year, where thousands of youngsters try to join the Indian Army.

== Geography ==
Hamirpur district is situated between 31°25′N and 31°52′N and between 76°18′E and 76°44′E. Hamirpur (town), the district headquarters, is situated at an altitude of 780 m with the highest point being the Awah Devi peak at an altitude of 1137m.

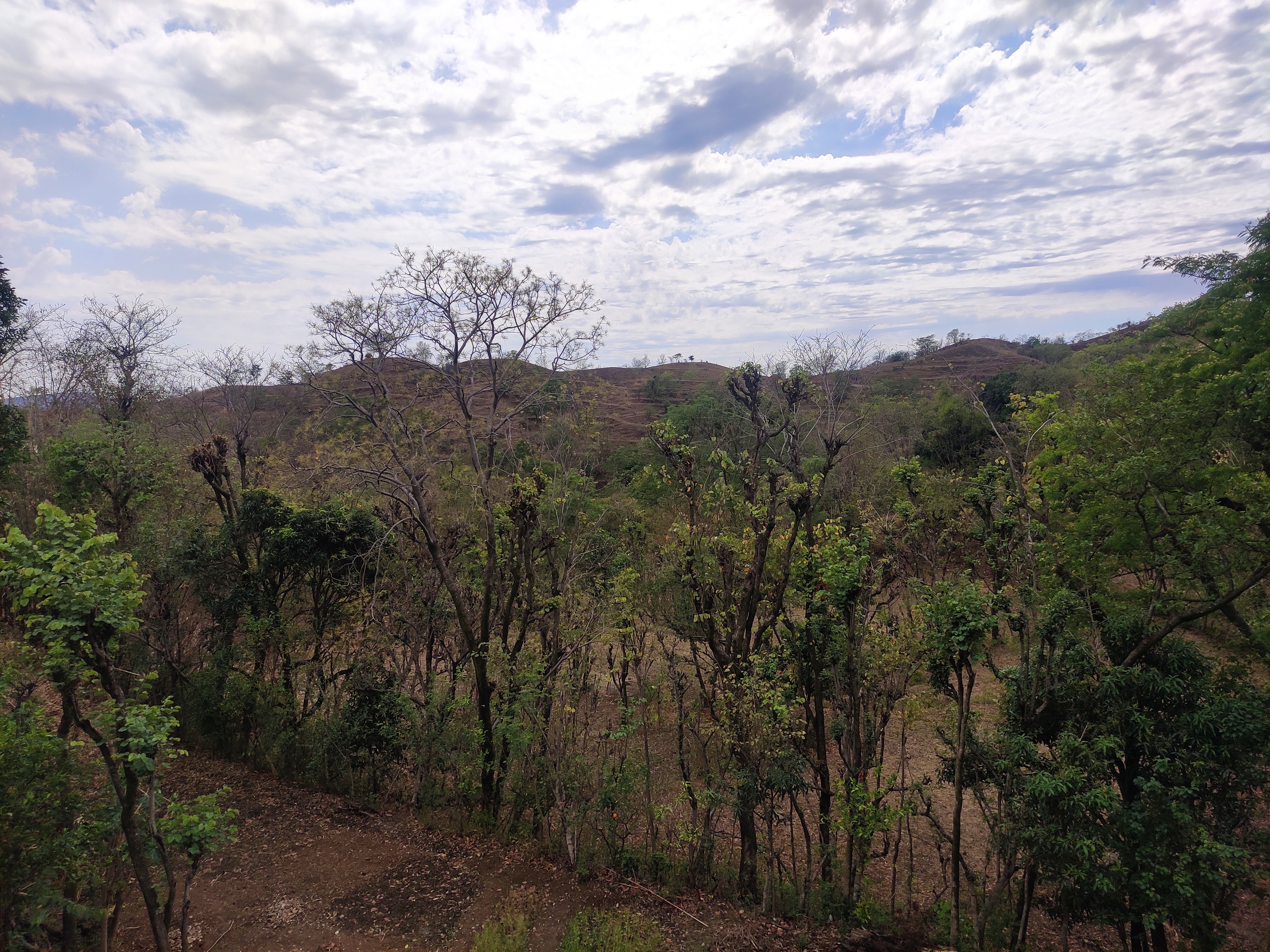
Shivalik Ranges in Dimmi

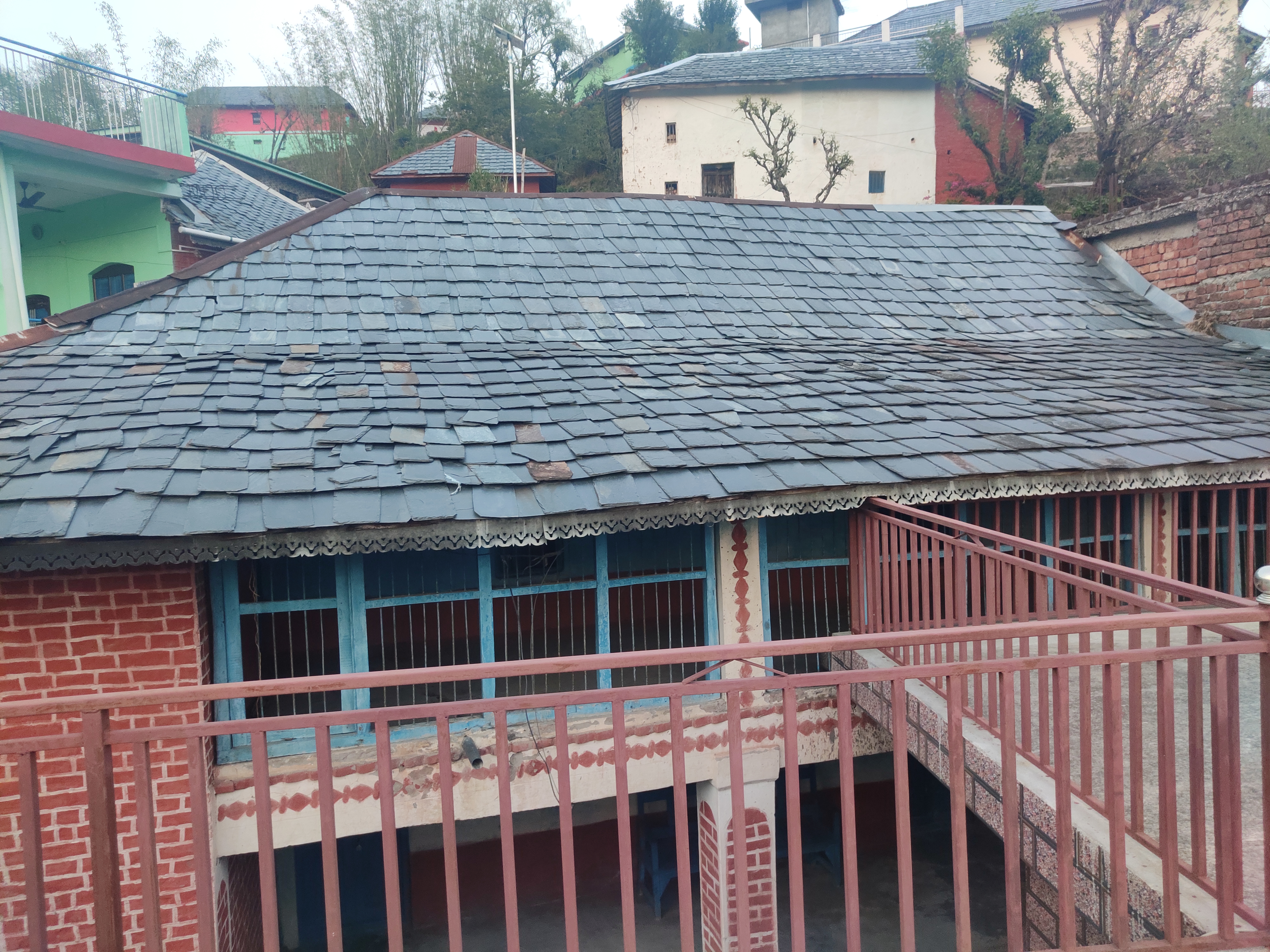
Old Houses in District Hamirpur

The district shares borders with the neighboring districts of Mandi to the east, Bilaspur to the south, Una to the west, and Kangra to the north. The River Beas separates Hamirpur from Kangra and is a parent river to two tributaries, namely Maan Khad and Kunah Khad ('Khad' is a word used to describe a rivulet) flowing across either side of Hamirpur district, to the adjacent Sutlej. Hamirpur district has a considerable amount of pine forests and it is also surrounded by Shivalik Ranges. Hamirpur is also home to mango trees.

It has highest Road density amongst all the districts in India.

=== Climate ===
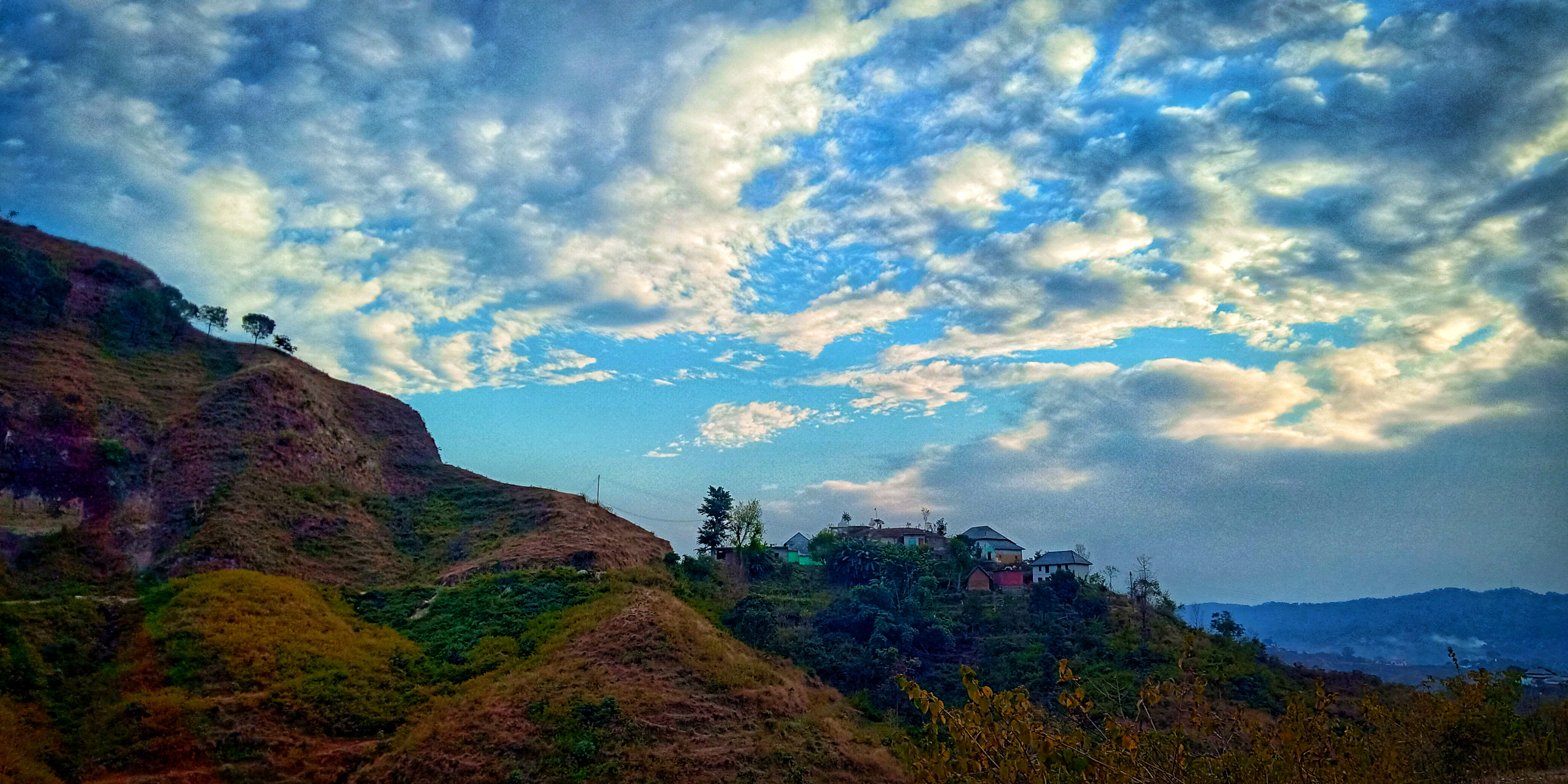
Near Chauri, Hamirpur

Hamirpur has the quintessential 'hill-station' weather found in most of Himachal Pradesh. During winter, the climate is very cold. Woollen clothing is required from August up to the end of March. During summers, the temperature often crosses 40 °C and cotton is recommended. It does not normally snow in the district but in January 2012 (after 44 years) and February 2019 some parts of Hamirpur district were reported to receive moderate snowfall.

== Divisions ==
The divisions Hamirpur, Barsar, Nadaun, Sujanpur and Bhoranj comprise the district.

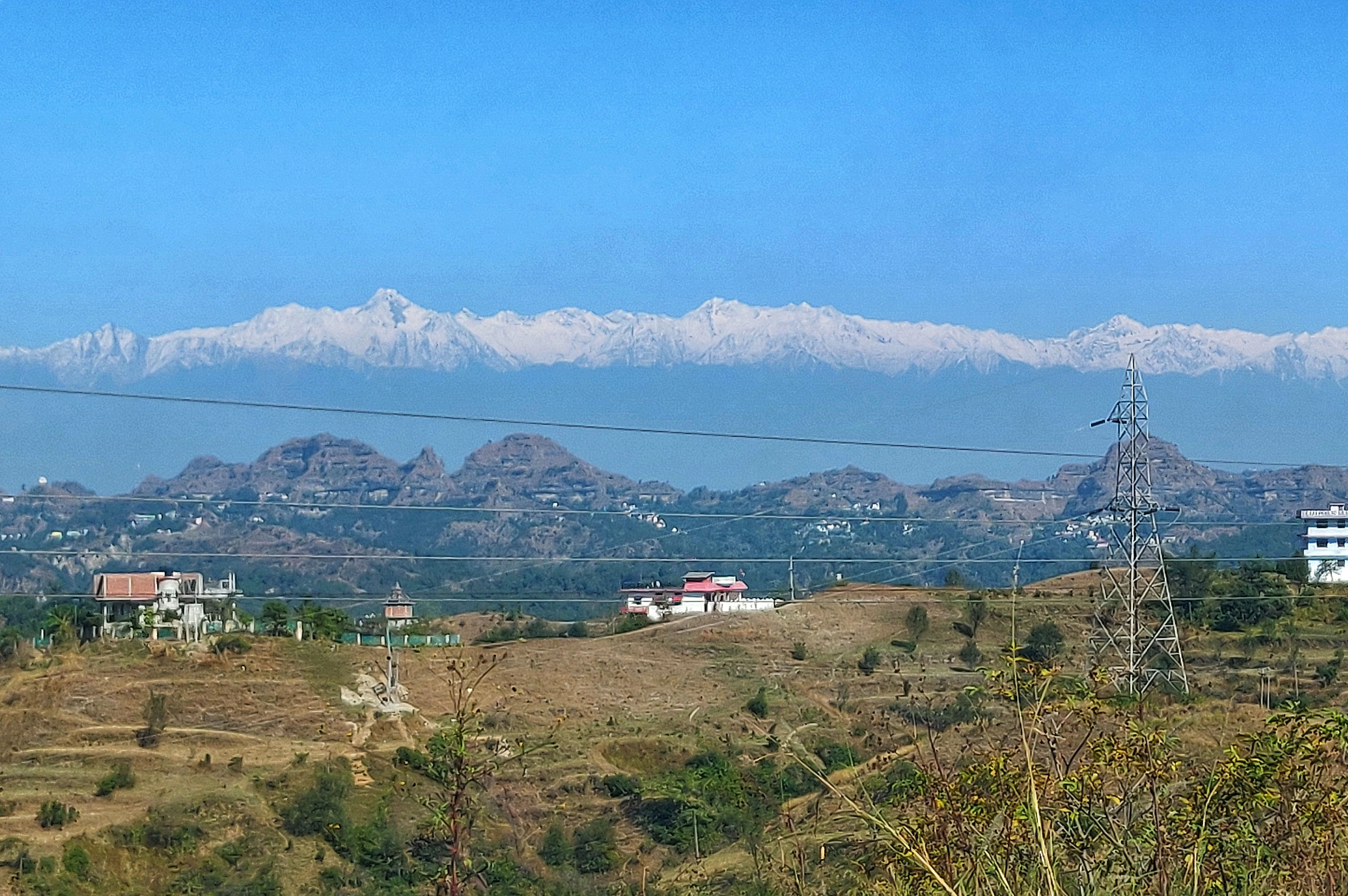
Hamirpur, Himachal Pradesh, India

Hamirpur district divided into 8 tehsils:

- Hamirpur Sadar
- Nadaun
- Sujanpur
- Barsar
- Bhoranj
- Tauni devi
- Dhatwal (Bijhari)
- Galore
- Lamblu(sub tehsil)

There are five Vidhan Sabha constituencies in this district: Barsar, Hamirpur, Sujanpur, Nadaun and Bhoranj. All of these are part of the Hamirpur, Himachal Pradesh Lok Sabha constituency.

== Demographics ==
Historical population
Year	Pop.	±% p.a.
1901	160,374	—
1911	157,251	−0.20%
1921	157,319	+0.00%
1931	165,837	+0.53%
1941	188,804	+1.31%
1951	191,311	+0.13%
1961	220,341	+1.42%
1971	264,991	+1.86%
1981	317,751	+1.83%
1991	369,128	+1.51%
2001	412,700	+1.12%
2011	454,768	+0.98%

Religions in Hamirpur district (2011)
Religion	Percent
Hinduism	98.82%
Islam	0.82%
Other or not stated	0.36%
Distribution of religions

According to the 2011 census, Hamirpur district has a population of 454,768, giving it a rank of 550th-largest in India (out of a total of 640). The district has a population density of 407 inhabitants per square kilometre (1,050/sq mi), the highest in the state. Its population growth rate over the decade 2001–2011 was 10.19%. Hamirpur has a sex ratio of 1095 (i.e.- females for every 1000 males) again highest in the state, and a literacy rate of 88.15%, the highest in the state. 6.91% of the population lives in urban areas. Scheduled Castes and Scheduled Tribes make up 24.02% and 0.67% of the population respectively.

A large proportion of the people in this district serve in the defense services, thus also known as “Veer Bhoomi” (English: Land of the heroes).

Languages of Hamirpur district (2011)
1. Pahari (76.0%)
2. Hindi (14.1%)
3. Kangri (3.55%)
4. Others (6.37%)

At the 2011 Census of India, 76% of the population declared their first language to be Pahari, 14.1% chose Hindi, 3.55% – Kangri, and 0.75% – Dogri.

== Famous Temples ==
- Baba Balak Nath Temple, Doetsidh: It is one of the most famous temples of Himachal Pradesh, and is thronged by pilgrims from all over Himachal and Punjab. It is popularly known as "Baba" and "Deotsidh" among the people of Himachal and Punjab. Only men and boys are allowed to go near the main idol of Baba Balak Nath, while women and girls can pay their homage to baba from a distance.
- Gasota Mahadev Temple
- Shani Dev Temple Lambloo
- Tauni Devi Temple
- Awah Devi Temple
- Shivpuri Dham Santana Temple
- Jamali Dham Tropka Temple
- Radha Krishna Temple Sujanpur Tira
- Adhi Shiv bhaleth Temple
- Adhi Shakti Dosadka Temple
- Shankt Mochan Hanuman Temple Bhaleth

== Politics ==
Politics in Hamirpur district is dominated by the Indian National Congress and the Bharatiya Janata Party.
