= Swaroop =

Swaroop may refer to:

== Given name ==
- Shanti Swaroop Bhatnagar OBE, FRS (1894–1955), Indian scientist and professor of chemistry
- Kishan Swaroop Chaudhari, B.Com. LLB., former Justice of Rajasthan High Court of India
- Shanti Swaroop Dhavan (1905–1978), jurist, diplomat and Governor of West Bengal
- Swaroop Kanchi (born 1983), Indian film director, producer and screenwriter
- Air Chief Marshal Swaroop Krishna Kaul (born 1935), Chief of Air Staff (India) between 1993 and 1995
- Swaroop Khan, Indian folk singer from Rajasthan, competitor in Indian Idol
- Swaroop Kishen (1930–1992), Indian Test cricket umpire
- Swaroop Philip, Indian cinematographer best in Malayalam cinema
- Shanti Swaroop Rana, Indian military officer
- P. Swaroop Reddy (born 1949), Indian judge
- Swaroop Sampat (born 1958), Indian actress in several Hindi language films
- Ram Swaroop Sharma (born 1958), politician from Jogindernagar, Himachal Pradesh, India
- Ram Swaroop Singh, Samajwadi Party politician
- Swaroop Singh (1917–2003), Indian academic turned politician

== Surname ==
- Anand Swaroop (born 1941), Indian former cricketer
- Chitranjan Swaroop (1946–2015), Indian politician on Uttar Pradesh of India
- Jyoti Swaroop, Indian film director, screenwriter and producer
- Kamal Swaroop, film, television and radio director and screenwriter
- Manjula Swaroop (born 1970), Indian film producer and actress in Telugu Cinema
- R. A. Swaroop (born 1965), Indian former first-class cricketer
- Raageshwari Loomba Swaroop (born 1977), Indian singer, actress and mindfulness speaker
- Shikha Swaroop (born 1970), Indian actress, and a former Miss India winner
- Shiva Swaroop, Indian Police Officer and Former Director General of Central Reserve Police Force

== Geography ==
- Imaliya Swaroop, village in the Bhopal district of Madhya Pradesh, India

== Entertainment ==
- Swaroop, an animated pilot aired on Cartoon Network

== See also ==
- Swarup, alternative form of the Indian male given name
- Swaroopam, a 1992 Indian film
