= Pratibha Singh =

Indian politician (born 1956)

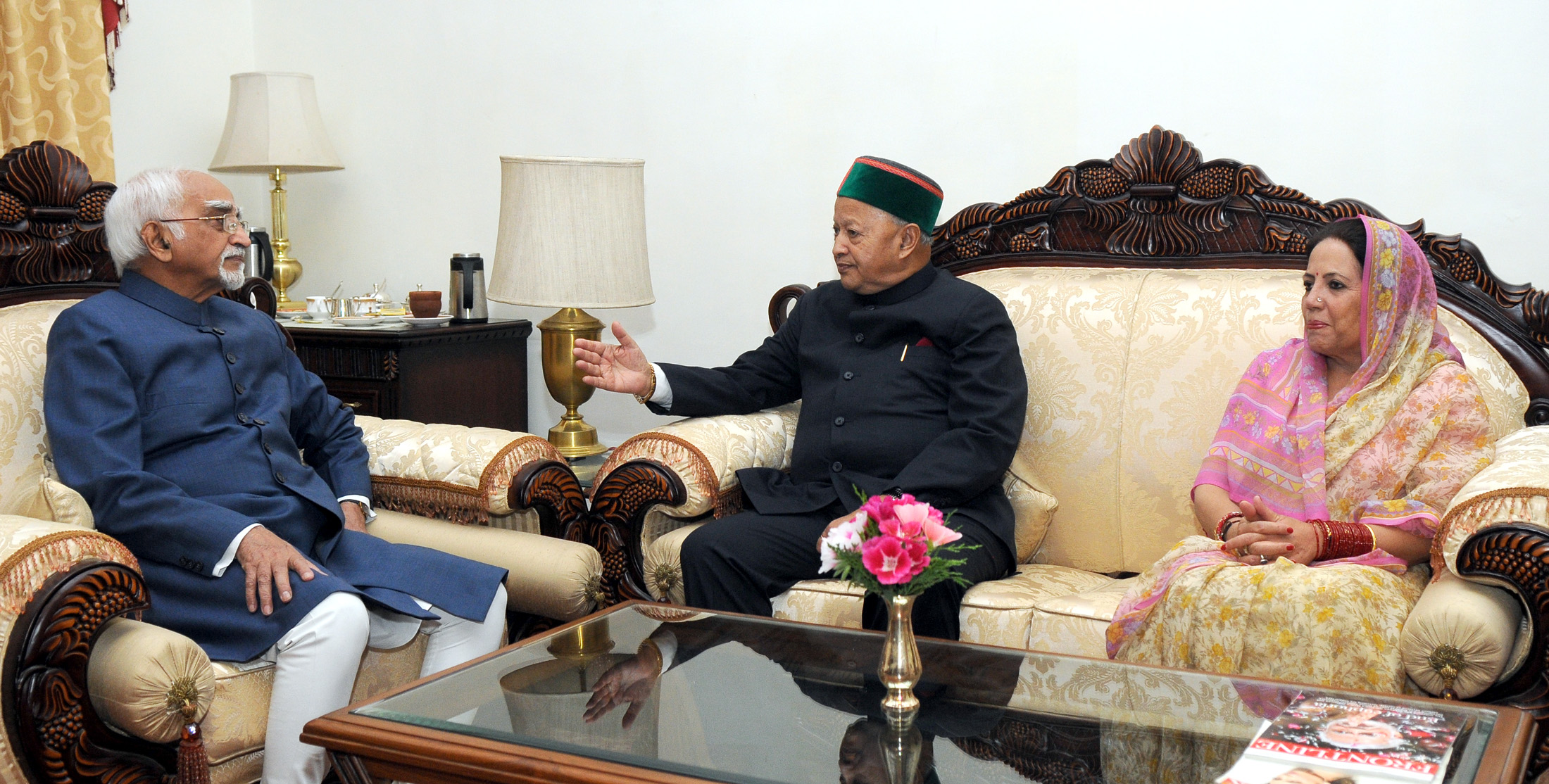

President of Himachal Pradesh Congress Committee
- In office 26 April 2022 – 22 November 2025
- National President: Sonia Gandhi; Rahul Gandhi; Mallikarjun Kharge
- Preceded by: Kuldeep Singh Rathore
- Succeeded by: Vinay Kumar

Member of Parliament, Lok Sabha
- In office 2 November 2021 – 4 June 2024
- Preceded by: Ram Swaroop Sharma
- Succeeded by: Kangana Ranaut
- Constituency: Mandi
- In office 2013–2014
- Preceded by: Virbhadra Singh
- Succeeded by: Ram Swaroop Sharma
- Constituency: Mandi
- In office 2004–2009
- Preceded by: Maheshwar Singh
- Succeeded by: Virbhadra Singh
- Constituency: Mandi

Personal details
- Born: 16 June 1956 (age 69) Junga, Himachal Pradesh, India
- Party: Indian National Congress
- Spouse: Virbhadra Singh (m. 1985; died 2021)
- Children: 2

Pratibha Singh (born 16 June 1956) is an Indian politician from Himachal Pradesh and a former Member of the Indian Parliament.

She is the widow of Virbhadra Singh, who was the six time Chief Minister of Himachal Pradesh. She represented the Mandi constituency of Himachal Pradesh and is a member of the Indian National Congress.

== Personal life ==
Pratibha Singh was born on 16 June 1956 in Shimla, Himachal Pradesh. She married Virbhadra Singh in 1985. She is his second wife. Virbhadra Singh's daughter from his first marriage, Abhilasha Kumari, served as a judge in Gujarat. Virbhadra Singh's son from his second marriage to Pratibha Singh, Vikramaditya Singh, serves as Member of Legislative Assembly from Shimla Rural constituency.

== Political career ==
Pratibha Singh gained a seat in the Lok Sabha which is the lower house of the Parliament of India in the Indian general elections of 2004 by defeating Maheshwar Singh. In the 2013 (By Poll) elections, she was again elected from the same seat as well as in 2021. Her son lost in 2024 from Mandi.

== Positions held ==
Year	Description
2004 - 2009	Elected to 14th Lok Sabha: Member, Committee on social Justice and Empowerment; Member, Consultative Committee, Ministry of Tourism; Member, Committee on Public Undertakings
2013 - 2014	Elected to 15th Lok Sabha
2021 - 2024	Elected to 17th Lok Sabha: Member, Committee on Education, Women, Children, Youth and Sports

== Electoral Performances ==
Year	Election	Party	Constituency Name	Result	Votes gained	Vote share%	Margin	Ref
2004	14th Lok Sabha	Indian National Congress	Mandi Lok Sabha	Won	3,57,623	53.41%	66,566	
2013 (Bye-Election)	15th Lok Sabha	Indian National Congress	Mandi Lok Sabha	Won	3,53,492	60.71%	1,36,727	
2014	16th Lok Sabha	Indian National Congress	Mandi Lok Sabha	Lost	3,22,968	44.46%	39,856	
2021 (Bye-Election)	17th Lok Sabha	Indian National Congress	Mandi Lok Sabha	Won	3,65,650	49.23%	8,766	

Lok Sabha
Preceded by Maheshwar Singh	Member of Parliament for Mandi; 2004 – 2009	Succeeded by Virbhadra Singh
Preceded by Virbhadra Singh	Member of Parliament for Mandi; 2013 – 2014	Succeeded by Ram Swaroop Sharma
Preceded by Ram Swaroop Sharma	Member of Parliament for Mandi; 2021 – 2024	Succeeded by Kangana Ranaut
