= P. Swaroop Reddy =

Indian judge (born 1949)

Pamulparthy Swaroop Reddy (born, on 10 Jan, 1949) is a retired Indian judge, who served on the Andhra Pradesh High Court.

== Early life and education ==
He was born to an agricultural family at Pamulparthy village of Medak District. He completed a bachelor's degree in Science and LL.M., from Osmania University. He served as a District Judge and Subordinate Judge at various places throughout the State. He was appointed as a Permanent Judge of the Andhra Pradesh High Court in 2006.

Swaroop Reddy retired as Judge, High Court of Andhra Pradesh on 9 January 2011.
