= Vikramaditya Singh (Himachal Pradesh politician) =

Indian politician (born 1989)

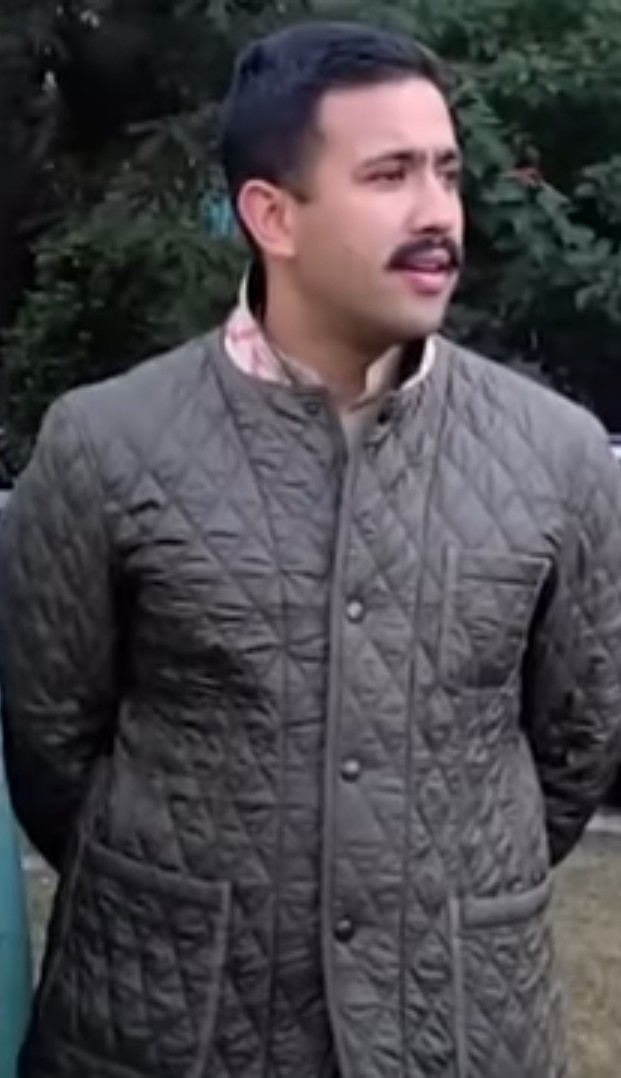
- Singh in 2024

Cabinet Minister, Government of Himachal Pradesh
- Incumbent
- Assumed office 8 January 2023
- Governor: Rajendra Arlekar (2022–2023); Shiv Pratap Shukla (2023–2026); Kavinder Gupta (2026–present)
- Chief Minister: Sukhvinder Singh Sukhu
- Ministry and Departments: Public Works; Urban Development

Member of the Himachal Pradesh Legislative Assembly
- Incumbent
- Assumed office 18 December 2017
- Preceded by: Virbhadra Singh
- Constituency: Shimla Rural

Personal details
- Born: 17 October 1989 (age 36) Shimla, Himachal Pradesh, India
- Party: Indian National Congress
- Spouse: Sudarshana Singh Chundawat (m. 2019; div. 2025) Amreen Kaur Sekhon (m. 2025)
- Parent(s): Virbhadra Singh (father); Pratibha Singh (mother)
- Education: MA History
- Alma mater: Bishop Cotton School; Hansraj College; St. Stephen's College; Delhi University

Vikramaditya Singh (born 17 October 1989) is an Indian politician, who currently serves as Member of Legislative Assembly from Shimla Rural constituency. (Note: Sources.) He is the son of the former chief minister of Himachal Pradesh Late Virbhadra Singh. His mother is Pratibha Singh, who was a Member of Parliament from Mandi, Lok Sabha Constituency.

On 10 July 2021, after the death of his father on 8 July, Vikramaditya Singh was crowned the pretender king of the erstwhile princely state of Bushahr in a private ceremony at Padam Palace in Rampur.

== Early life and education ==
Vikramaditya Singh was born on 17 October 1989 in Shimla district in the royal Rajput family of the princely state of Bushahr. He is son of Late Raja Virbhadra Singh, six time former chief minister of Himachal Pradesh and former Member of Parliament Pratibha Singh. Vikramaditya is half-brother to Abhilasha Kumari, a former Judge.

Vikramaditya Singh did his schooling from Bishop Cotton School, Shimla. He did his Graduation and Post-Graduation in History from Delhi University. Vikramaditya pursued his graduation B.A. in history from Hansraj College (DU) and post-graduate degree M.A. (Hons.) in History from St. Stephen's College, Delhi.

== Political career ==
Vikramaditya's active state political journey started in 2013 and he associated with HP Congress Committee. He was elected as Himachal Pradesh state youth congress president in year 2013 until the year 2017.

In 2017, he won from Shimla Rural constituency as the Member of Legislative Assembly for Himachal Pradesh Legislative Assembly and again in 2022. Later, On 8 January 2023 he became PWD, Youth Services & Sports, Urban Development Minister of Himachal Pradesh in Sukhwinder Singh Sukhu Ministry.

== Personal life ==
On 8 March 2019, Vikramaditya Singh married Sudarshana Singh Chundawat, a member of the former royal family of Amet in Mewar, at Jaipur. The couple separated in 2022, after Sudarshana filed a domestic violence complaint against Singh. A divorce petition was subsequently filed in 2023, and in February 2024 a Udaipur family court ordered Singh to pay interim maintenance to his estranged wife. In August 2025, media reports confirmed that the petition had been settled earlier in the year and that the couple had legally divorced.

On 22 September 2025, Singh married Amreen Kaur Sekhon, a member of the former aristocractic family of Kalbanjara. The family were Kiladars of the Patiala Royal Family. Her father, Sardar Jotinder Singh Sekhon is a High Court lawyer and mother, Sardarni Opinder Kaur of Chandigarh is a doctorate in psychology from Panjab University, at a private ceremony in Chandigarh.
