= Virbhadra Singh =

Indian politician (1934–2021)

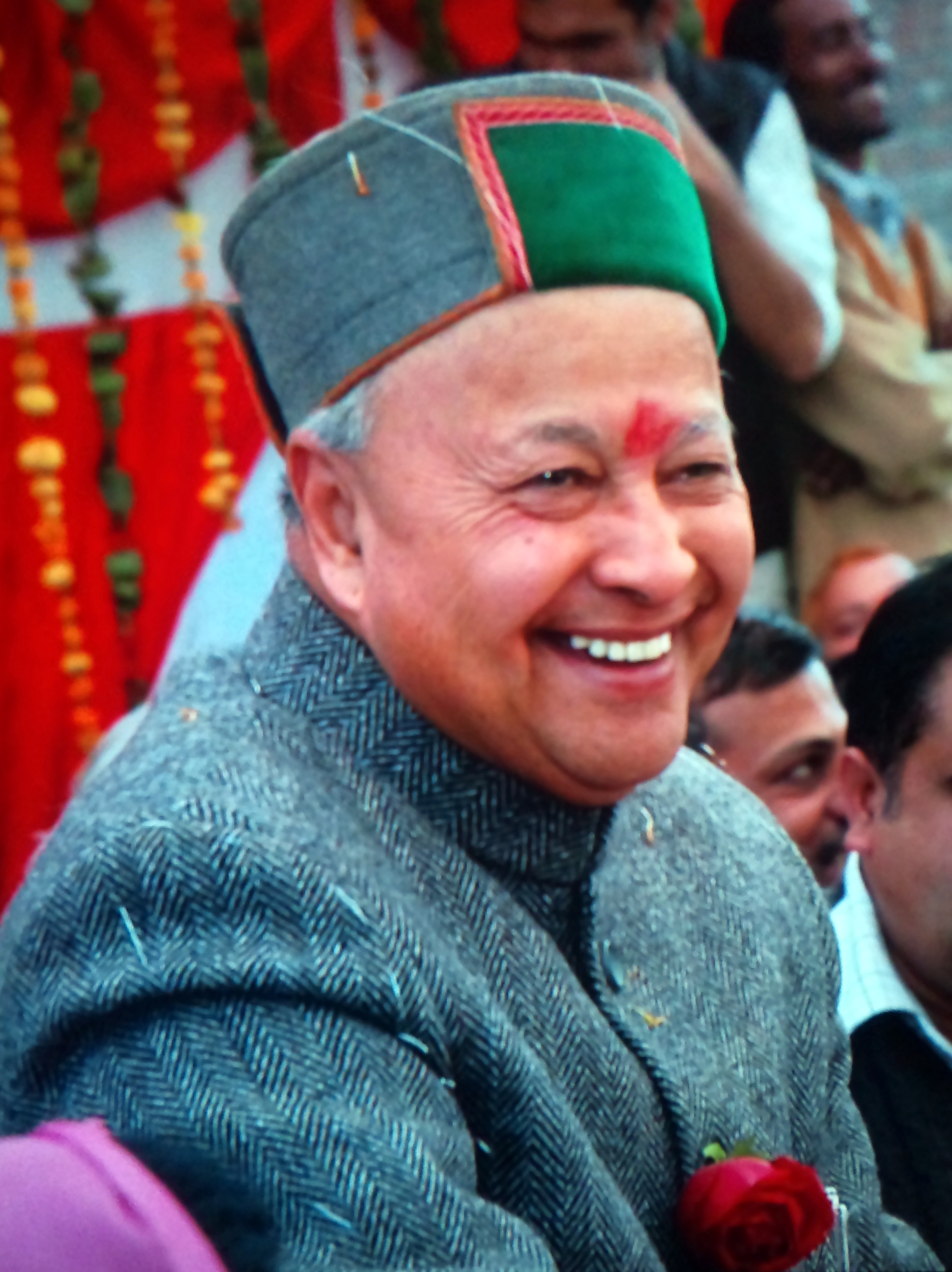
- Virbhadra Singh, c. 2012

4th Chief Minister of Himachal Pradesh
- In office 25 December 2012 – 27 December 2017
- Governor: Urmila Singh, Kalyan Singh, Acharya Devvrat
- Preceded by: Prem Kumar Dhumal
- Succeeded by: Jai Ram Thakur
- In office 6 March 2003 – 30 December 2007
- Governor: Suraj Bhan, Vishnu Sadashiv Kokje
- Preceded by: Prem Kumar Dhumal
- Succeeded by: Prem Kumar Dhumal
- In office 3 December 1993 – 24 March 1998
- Governor: Surendra Nath, Viswanathan Ratnam, Sudhakarrao Naik, Mahabir Prasad, Sheila Kaul, Mahabir Prasad, V. S. Rama Devi
- Preceded by: Shanta Kumar
- Succeeded by: Prem Kumar Dhumal
- In office 8 April 1983 – 5 March 1990
- Governor: Hokishe Sema, Prabodh Dinkarrao Desai, Rustom K. S. Ghandhi, S. M. H. Burney, Hari Anand Barari, Basavaiah Rachaiah, Virendra Verma
- Preceded by: Thakur Ram Lal
- Succeeded by: Shanta Kumar

MLA, Himachal Pradesh Legislative Assembly
- In office 2017–2021
- Preceded by: Govind Ram Sharma
- Succeeded by: Sanjay Awasthy
- Constituency: Arki

Minister of Micro, Small and Medium Enterprises
- In office 19 January 2011 – 26 June 2012
- Prime Minister: Manmohan Singh
- Preceded by: Dinsha Patel
- Succeeded by: Vilasrao Deshmukh

Minister of Steel
- In office 28 May 2009 – 18 January 2011
- Prime Minister: Manmohan Singh
- Preceded by: Ram Vilas Paswan
- Succeeded by: Beni Prasad Verma

Minister of State for Industries
- In office September 1982 – April 1983
- Prime Minister: Indira Gandhi

Minister of State for Tourism, Civil Aviation
- In office December 1976 – March 1977
- Prime Minister: Indira Gandhi

President of Himachal Pradesh Congress Committee
- In office 23 August 2012 – 1 January 2013
- Preceded by: Kaul Singh Thakur
- Succeeded by: Sukhvinder Singh Sukhu

Personal details
- Born: 23 June 1934 Sarahan, Bushahr, Simla Hill States, Punjab States Agency, British India (now in Shimla district, Himachal Pradesh, India)
- Died: 8 July 2021 (aged 87) Shimla, Himachal Pradesh, India
- Party: Indian National Congress
- Spouses: Ratna Kumari (m. 1954; died 1983) Pratibha Singh (m. 1985)
- Children: 6 (including Vikramaditya and Abhilasha)
- Education: Colonel Brown Cambridge School; St. Edward's School; Bishop Cotton School; St. Stephen's College; Delhi University

Titular Raja of Bushahr
- Reign: 1947–1971 (recognised); 1971-2021 (unrecognised)
- Predecessor: Padam Singh
- Successor: Vikramaditya Singh (unrecognised)

Virbhadra Singh ([viːrəbʰəd̪rə siⁿɦə]; 23 June 1934 – 8 July 2021) was an Indian politician who served six terms and 21 years as the 4th Chief Minister of Himachal Pradesh. A leader of the Indian National Congress party, he was elected nine times as a Member of Legislative Assembly to the Himachal Pradesh Vidhan Sabha and five times as Member of Parliament to the Lok Sabha. Virbhadra Singh was popularly known by the honorific Raja Sahib. Singh holds the distinction of being the longest serving Chief Minister of Himachal Pradesh, holding the office from 1983 to 1990, from 1993 to 1998, from 2003 to 2007 and finally from 2012 to 2017, when he was succeeded by the BJP's Jai Ram Thakur. He was elected to the Lok Sabha in 1962, 1967, 1971, 1980 and 2009. Singh served as a Union Minister in the governments of Indira Gandhi and Manmohan Singh. At the time of his demise, he was serving as an MLA from Arki constituency.

== Personal life ==
Virbhadra Singh was born on 23 June 1934 at Sarahan, Shimla district in the royal Rajput family of the erstwhile princely state of Bushahr. He was the 122nd titular Raja of Bushahr from 1947 until 1971, when, by the 26th Amendment to the Constitution of India, the privy purses of the princes were abolished and official recognition of their titles came to an end.

Singh was educated at Colonel Brown Cambridge School, Dehradun, St. Edward's School, Shimla and Bishop Cotton School, Shimla and later obtained a BA Honours degree from St. Stephen's College, Delhi.

He was married to Ratna Kumari, princess of Jubbal in May 1954. They had four daughters including Abhilasha Kumari, a former judge who served on the High Court of Gujarat from 2006 to 2018. Ratna Kumari died in 1983 after prolonged sickness.

In 1985, he was married for the second time, to Pratibha Singh, princess of Keonthal. Pratibha had been elected thrice to the Lok Sabha from Mandi, for the first time in 2004 and afterwards in 2013 and 2021 bypolls. They both had a daughter and a son. His daughter Aparajitha Singh is married to the Maharaja of Patiala and former Punjab Chief Minister Capt. Amarinder Singh's grandson. His son Vikramaditya Singh is currently serving as Member of Legislative Assembly from Shimla Rural constituency.

== National politics ==
Singh gained a seat in the Lok Sabha—which is the lower house of the Parliament of India—in the Indian general elections of 1962. He repeated that success in the elections of 1967 and 1971. He was again elected to the Lok Sabha in 1980 and a further election to that house came in 2009, following an absence from the intervening two Lok Sabhas. His wife had served a term following her victory in the 2004 elections.

He was a member of the Indian Delegation to the General Assembly of the United Nations in 1976.

Between 1976 and 1977, Singh held the national office of Deputy Minister for Tourism and Civil Aviation in central cabinet. He was Minister of State for Industries between 1980 and 1983. From May 2009 until January 2011, he held the cabinet post of Minister for Steel. He then became cabinet minister with responsibility for Ministry of Micro, Small and Medium Enterprises, until resigning from office in June 2012.

== State politics ==
Aside from his role in national politics, Singh had also been elected on seven occasions to the Himachal Pradesh Legislative Assembly. The first occasion was in a by-election in October 1983, when he was returned for the Jubbal-Kotkhai constituency. He won that seat again in the 1985 elections. Thereafter, he was elected from the Rohru constituency in 1990, 1993, 1998, 2003 and 2007 and in 2012 from Shimla rural assembly constituency.

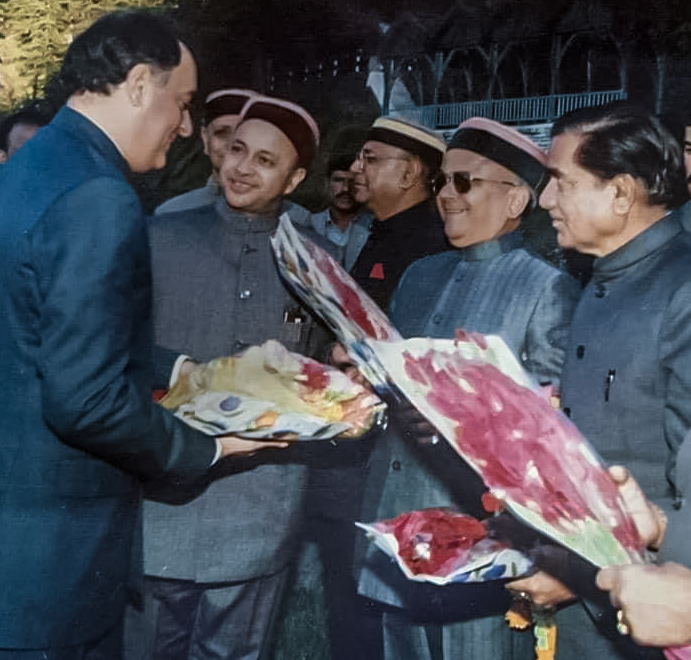
From left to right: Rajiv Gandhi, Virbhadra Singh, Sat Mahajan (in back), Jai Bihari Lal Khachi and Sagar Chand Nayyar during Rajiv Gandhi's visit to Shimla

Singh became the Chief Minister of Himachal Pradesh for the first time in April 1983 and held the post until March 1990. He was again appointed to the role between December 1993 and March 1998; and once more from March 2003. With reappointments within those years, this record amounted to him holding the office on five occasions.

Between 1998 and 2003, Singh was Leader of the Opposition in the state Assembly. He was president of the Himachal Pradesh Congress Committee in 1977, 1979 and 1980 and from 26 August 2012 to December 2012. In July 2012, he quit all key party posts at a crucial time prior to the state elections of November 2012. It has been reported that the trigger for the resignations was his exclusion from the Screening Committee for short-listing of election candidates.

Singh was appointed to lead the party on the eve of the November 2012 elections and did so with success. The party then agreed to him becoming Chief Minister of Himachal Pradesh for a record sixth time. His party lost majority in the 2017 elections and he tendered his resignation afterwards.

== Social and cultural activities ==
Outside of politics, Singh was involved with various social and cultural bodies. A consequence of these interests is that he was president of the Sanskrit Sahitya Sammelan and of the Himachal Pradesh branch of the Friends of the Soviet Union.

== Corruption charges ==
On 3 August 2009, a legal case was registered against Singh and his wife by the Anti-Corruption Bureau of Himachal Pradesh. The allegations were that they had breached the Prevention of Corruption Act in 1989, when Singh was Chief Minister of the state. The Bureau alleged that it had evidence in recorded conversations between the couple and various others concerning suspect financial transactions. The alleged recordings, which involved a now-dead officer of the Indian Administrative Service and several industrialists, dated from 2007 and were provided by a political opponent, Vijai Singh Mankotia.

The couple were granted bail in December 2010, but in April 2011, the state government requested that this be rescinded due to allegations of witness tampering. This request followed attempts by two industrialists to remove themselves from the prosecution case, claiming that the evidence was forged and incorrect.

The Singhs have attempted to have the matter taken out of police hands and passed to the Central Bureau of Investigation, as well as seeking a stay on further trial court proceedings. In January 2012, the Himachal Pradesh High Court had refused the latest of their petitions aimed at achieving the transfer and stay. The court ordered that the examination of potential charges and evidence by a trial court should go ahead. On 26 June 2012, Singh resigned from the Union Cabinet as a consequence of corruption charges being pressed against him. The couple were acquitted on the eve of Singh taking the role of Chief Minister in December 2012.

=== CBI inquiry ===
In 2015 the Central Bureau of Investigation filed a case against Singh and his family for owning assets to the tune of Rs. 6.1 crore disproportionate to his known sources of income when he was the union minister between 2009 and 2011. Cases have been filed against his wife Pratibha Singh, son Vikramaditya and daughter Aparajita as well. On Saturday, 26 September, the Central Bureau of Investigations (CBI) raided 11 properties of Virbhadra Singh to probe the charges of accumulating disproportionate assets. A case had been filed by the agency one day before the raids. On 26 October 2015, the Indian Supreme Court turned down a CBI plea seeking stay against an earlier order issued by the Himachal Pradesh High Court granting protection from arrest and other relief to him and his wife in a disproportionate assets case. The SC, however, issued a notice to Singh and his wife, seeking response from Singh on the two petitions filed by the CBI.

== Death ==
Singh's health deteriorated after he suffered from a cardiac arrest on 5 July 2021 in Indira Gandhi Medical College, Shimla. He had tested positive for COVID-19 on 11 June for the second time in two months. Virbhadra Singh died on 8 July 2021 due to multiple organ failure. The Himachal Pradesh government observed a three-day state mourning as a mark of respect to him. Virbhadra Singh was cremated with full state honours in Shimla's Rampur Bushahr on 10 July 2021.

== Gallery ==
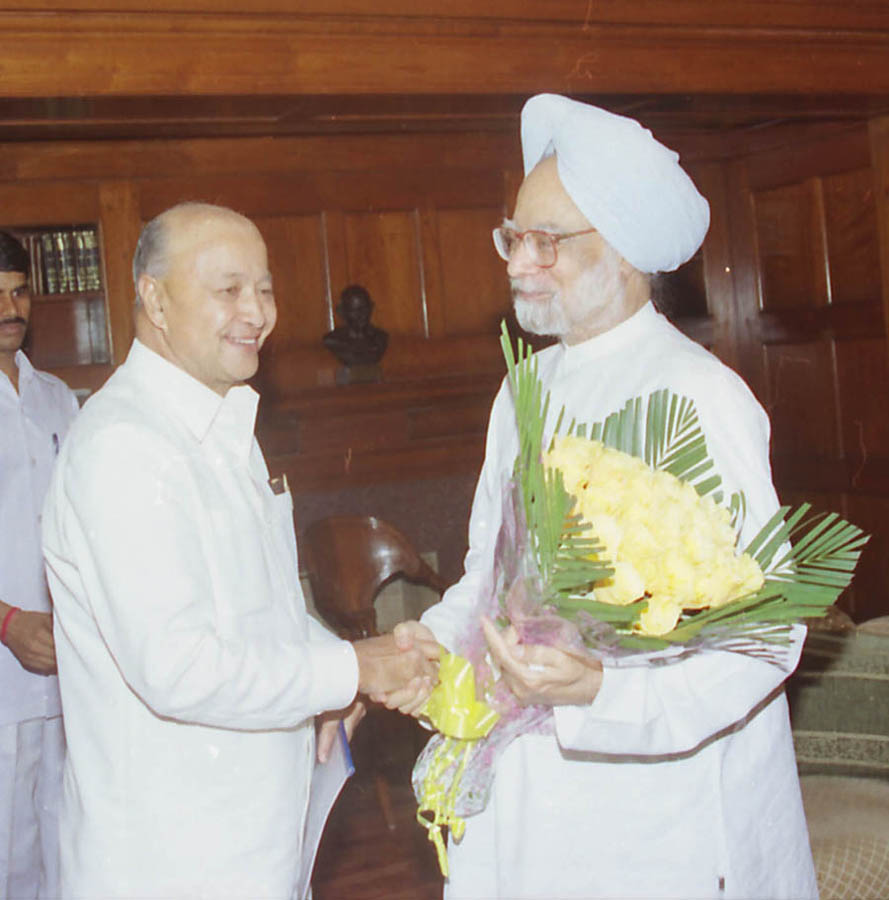
The Chief Minister of Himachal Pradesh Shri Virbhadra Singh calls on the Prime Minister Dr. Manmohan Singh in New Delhi on 2 June 2004

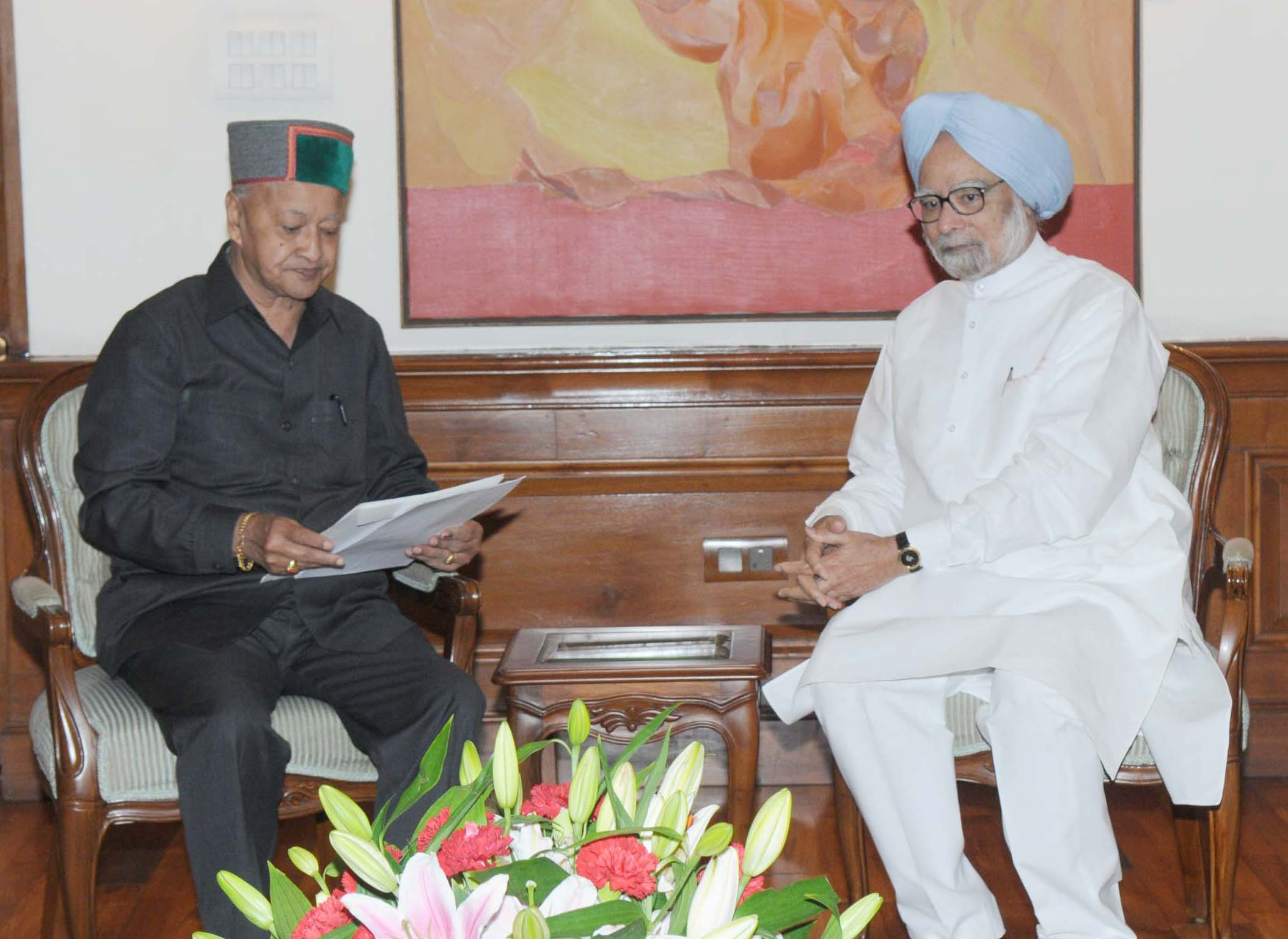
The Chief Minister of Himachal Pradesh, Shri Virbhadra Singh meeting the Prime Minister, Dr. Manmohan Singh, in New Delhi on 28 June 2013

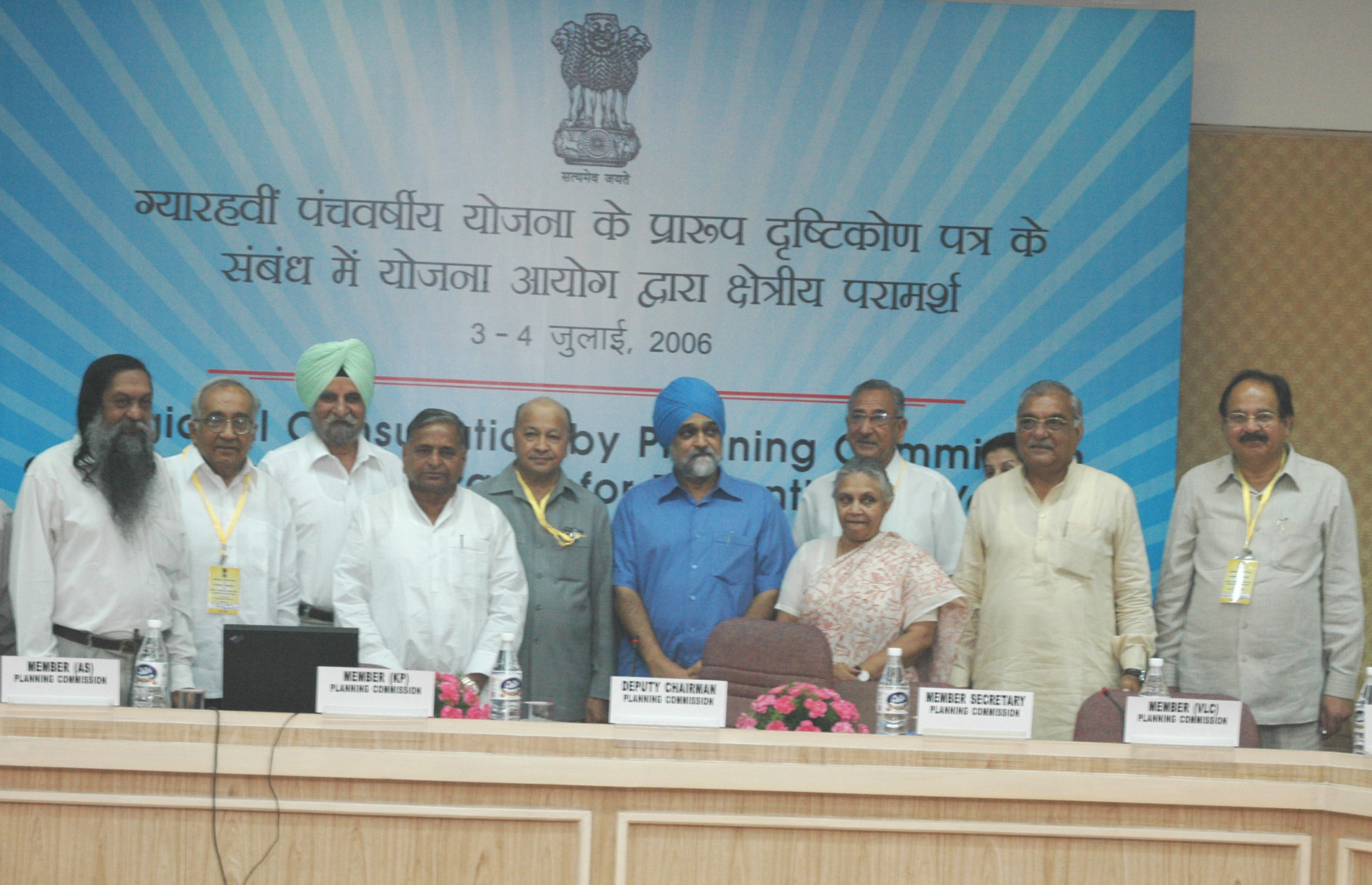
The Deputy Chairman, Planning Commission, Shri Montek Singh Ahluwalia with the Chief Minister of Uttar Pradesh, Shri Mulayam Singh Yadav, the Chief Minister of Himachal Pradesh, Shri Virbhadra Singh

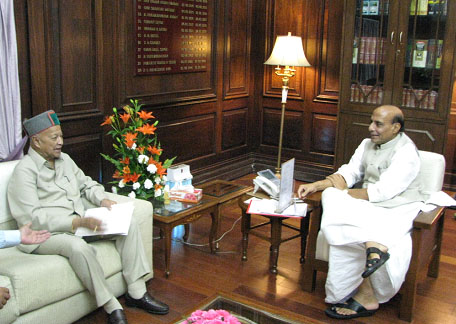
The Chief Minister of Himachal Pradesh, Shri Virbhadra Singh calling on the Union Home Minister, Shri Rajnath Singh, in New Delhi on 5 June 2014

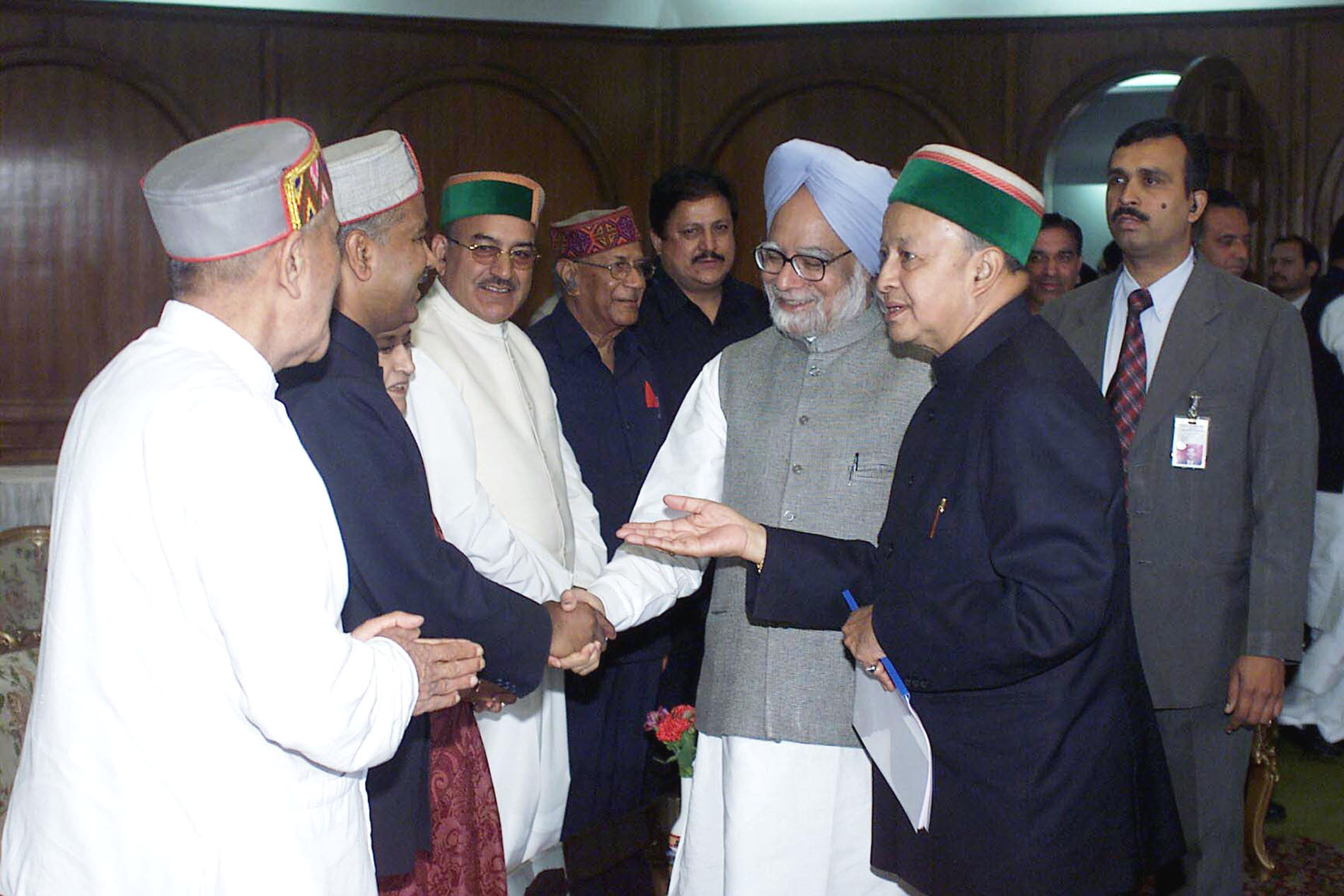
The Chief Minister Raja Virbhadra Singh introducing the Prime Minister, Dr. Manmohan Singh to the State Ministers of Himachal Pradesh in Shimla, on 29 May 2005

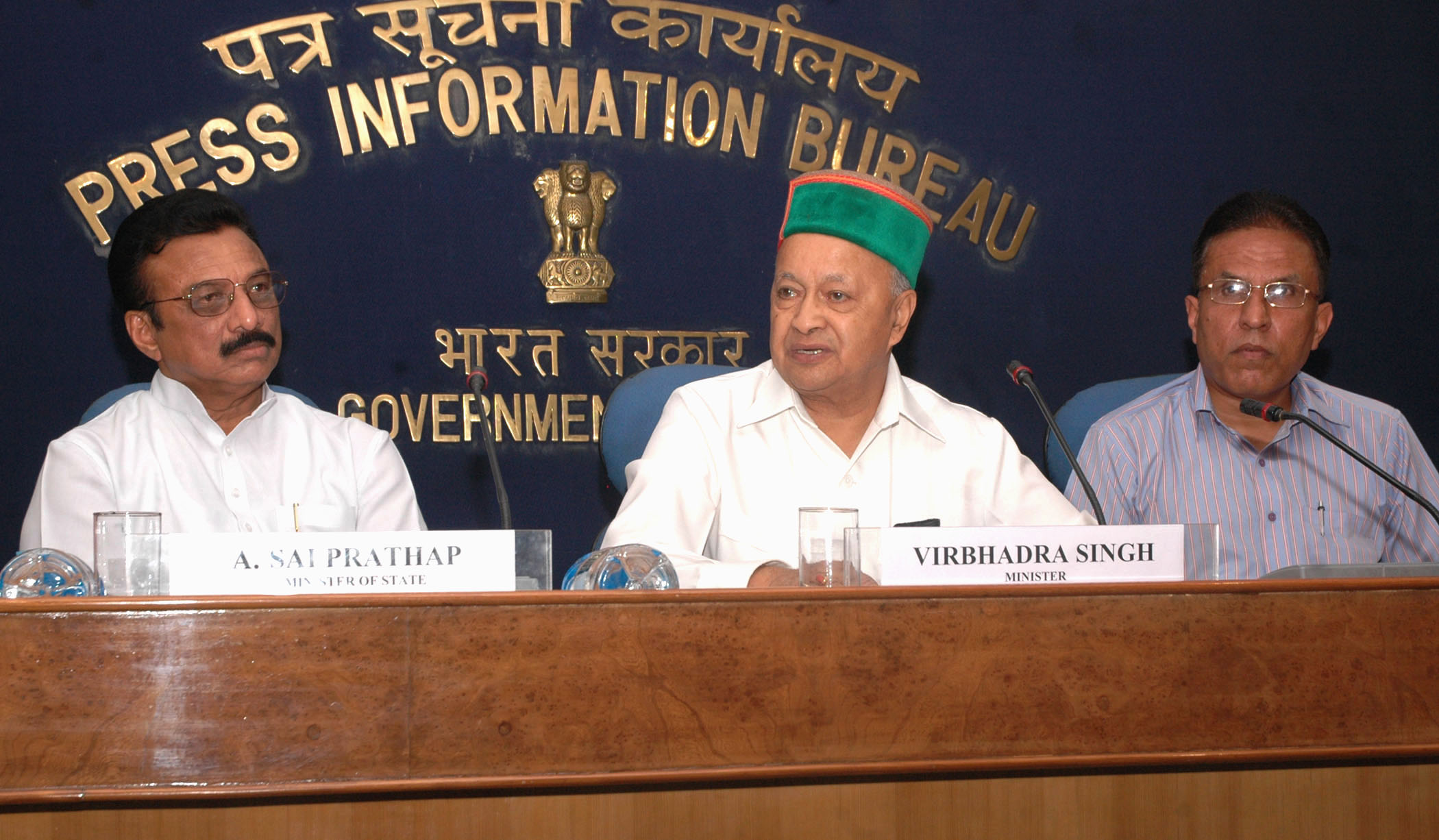
The Union Minister of Steel, Shri Virbhadra Singh addressing a Press Conference, in New Delhi on 31 May 2010

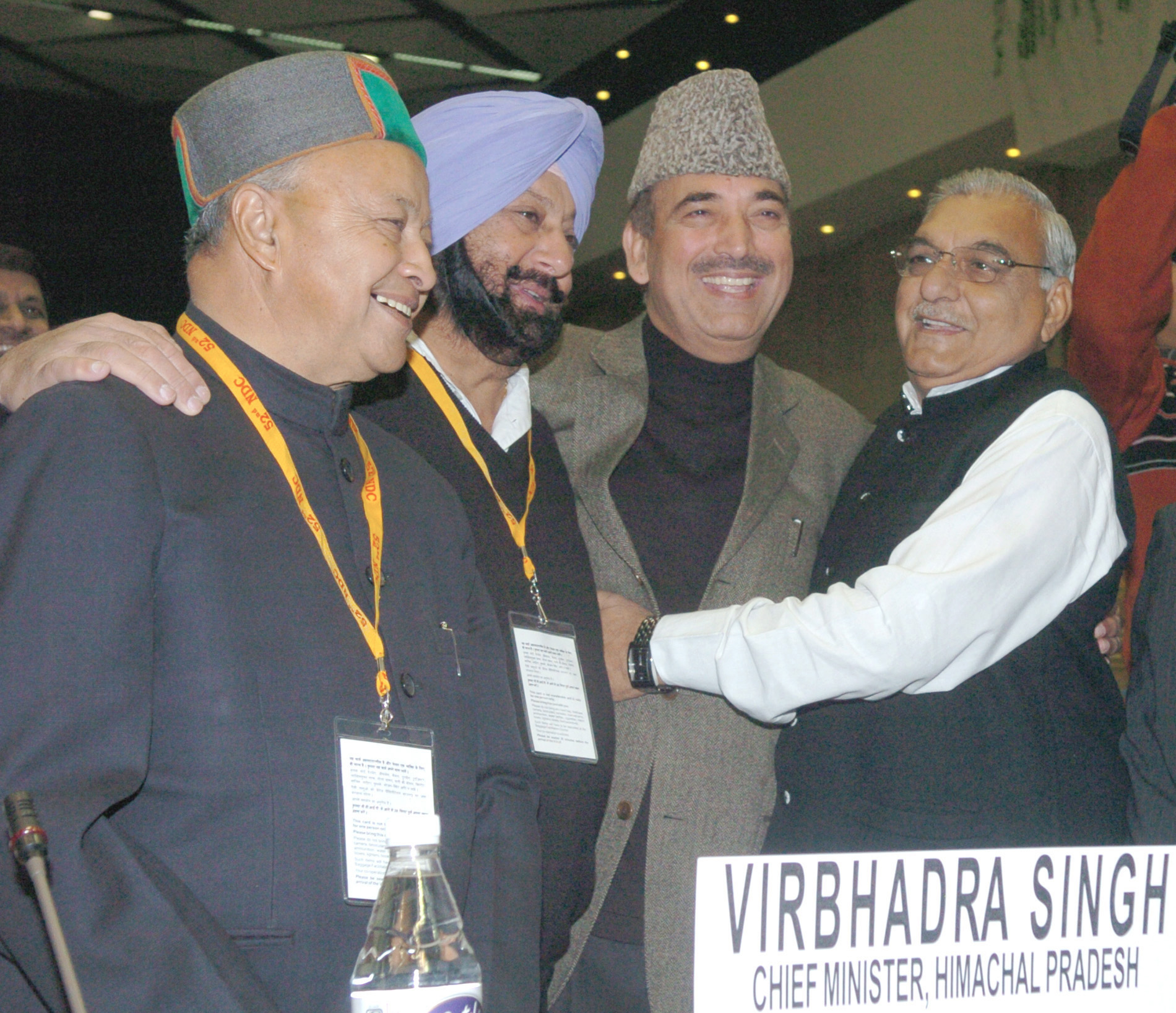
Himachal Pradesh Chief Minister Shri Virbhadra Singh, Punjab Chief Minister Captain Amarinder Singh, Jammu & Kashmir Chief Minister Shri. Ghulam Nabi Azad

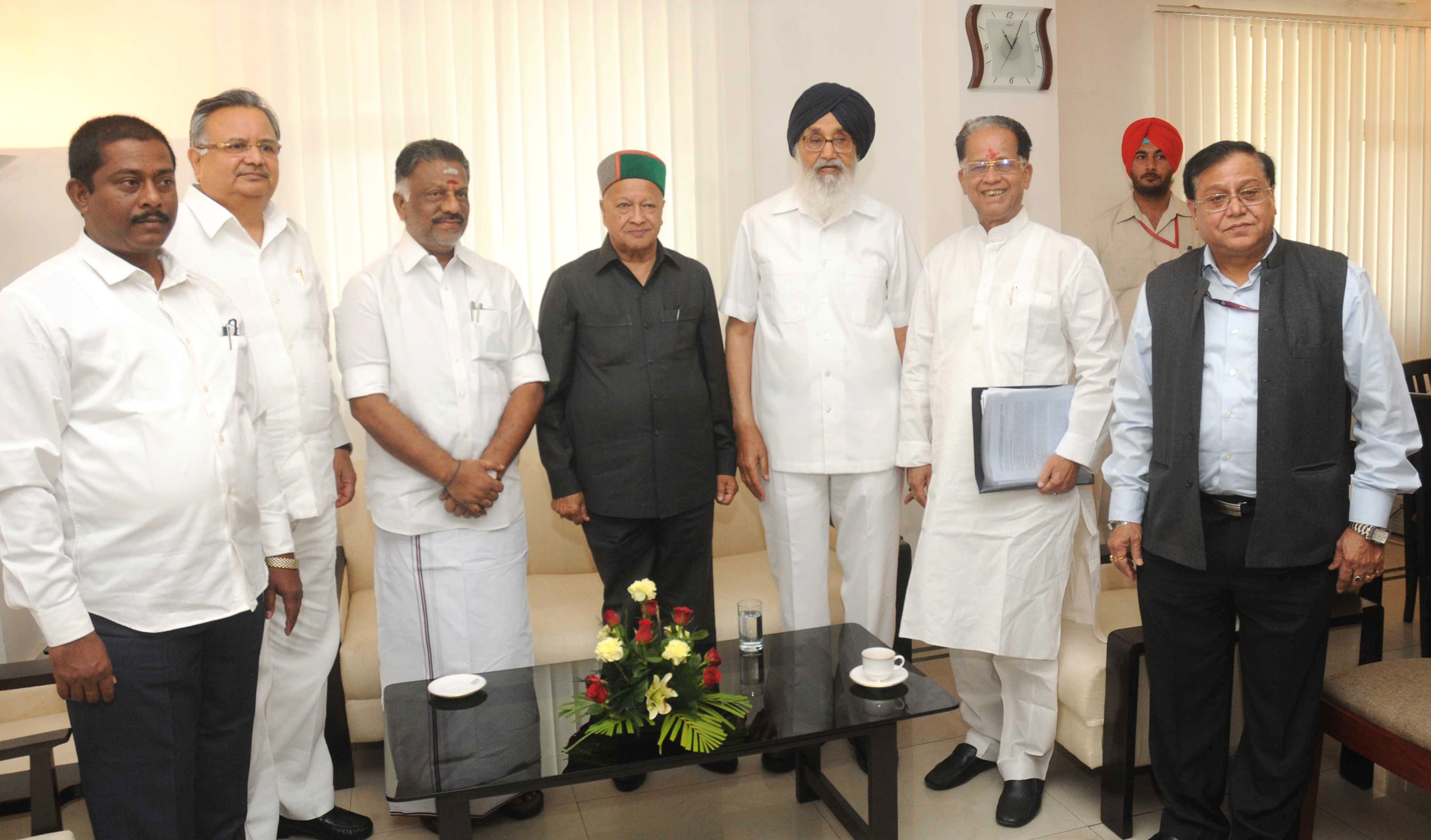
Tarun Gogoi, the Chief Minister of Punjab, Shri Prakash Singh Badal, the Chief Minister of Himachal Pradesh, Shri Virbhadra Singh, the Chief Minister of Chhattisgarh, Dr. Raman Singh, the Chief Minister of Tamil Nadu

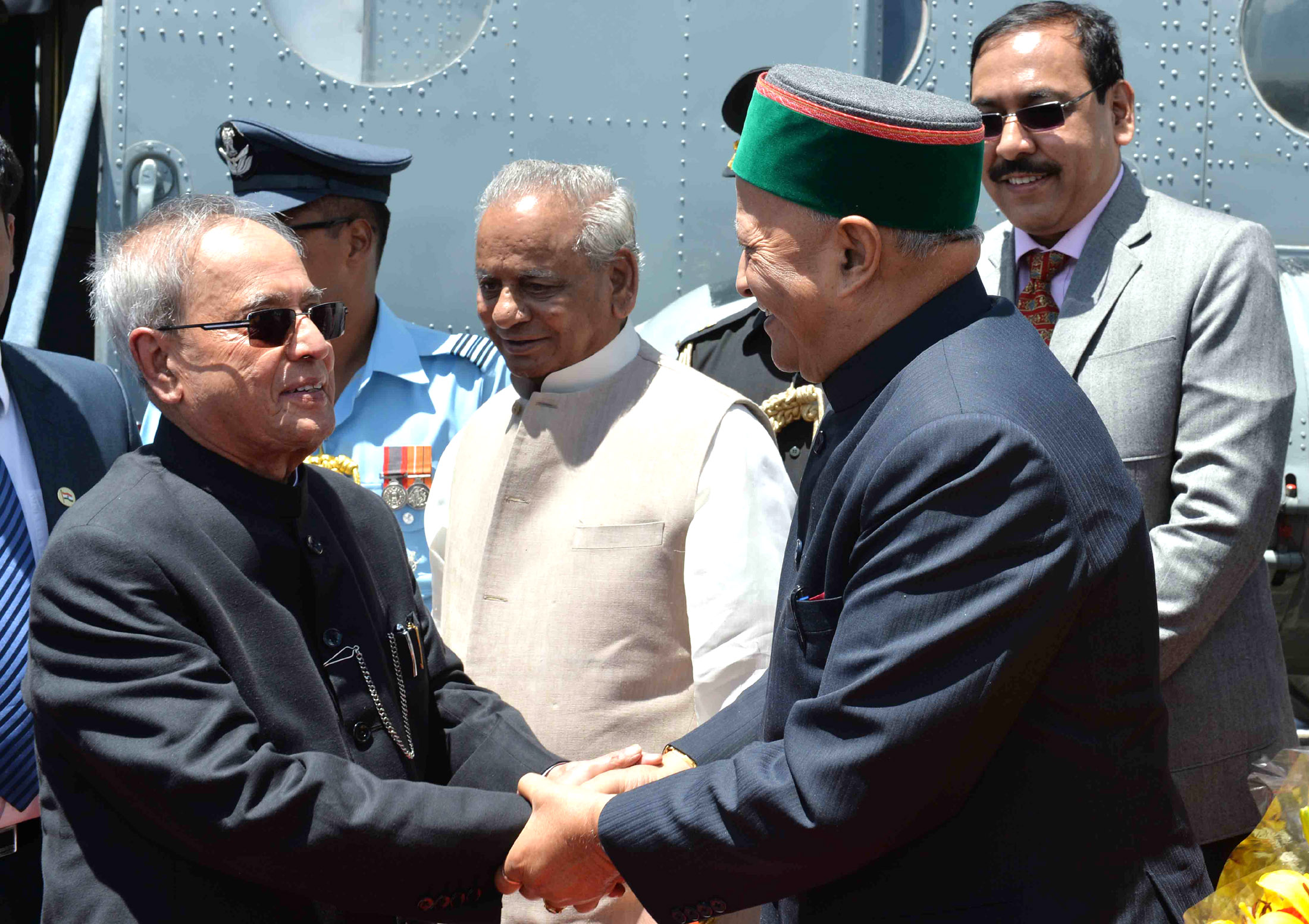
Pranab Mukherjee being welcomed by the Governor of Himachal Pradesh, Shri Kalyan Singh and the Chief Minister of Himachal Pradesh, Shri Virbhadra Singh, on his arrival, at Kalyani Helipad, in Himachal Pradesh

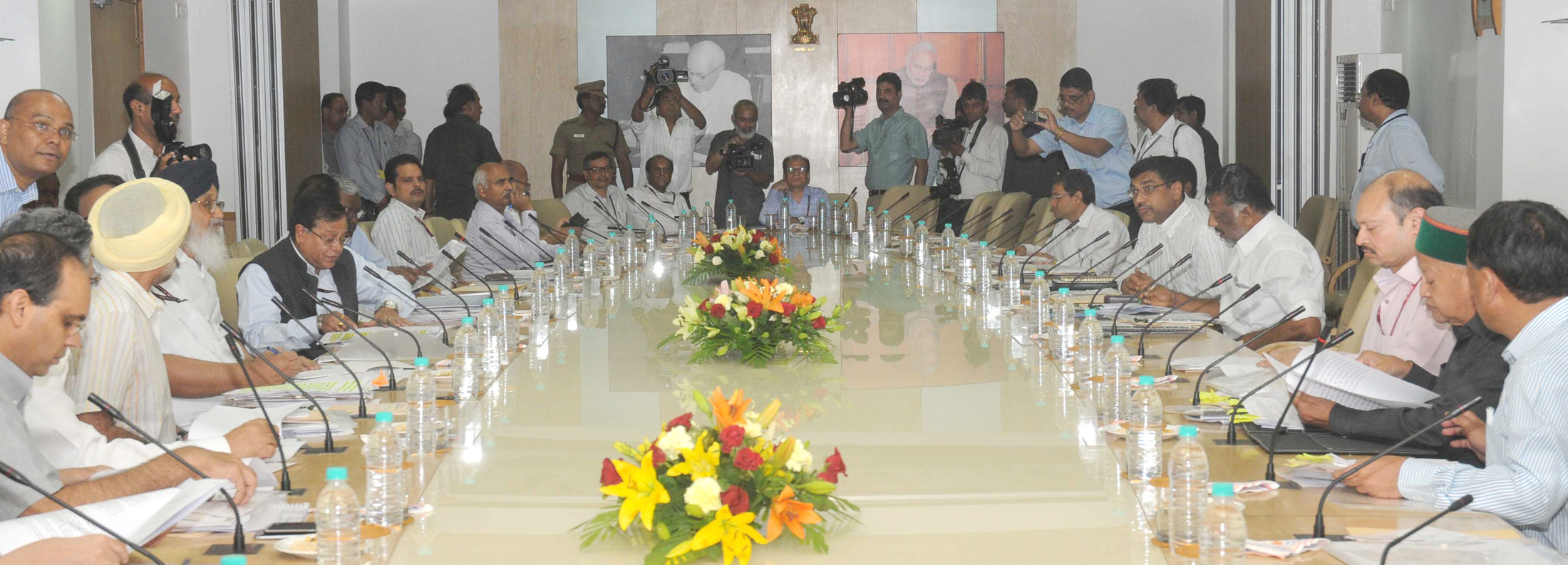
Tarun Gogoi, the Chief Minister of Punjab, Shri Prakash Singh Badal, the Chief Minister of Himachal Pradesh, Shri Virbhadra Singh, the Chief Minister of Chhattisgarh, Dr. Raman Singh, the Chief Minister of Tamil Nadu

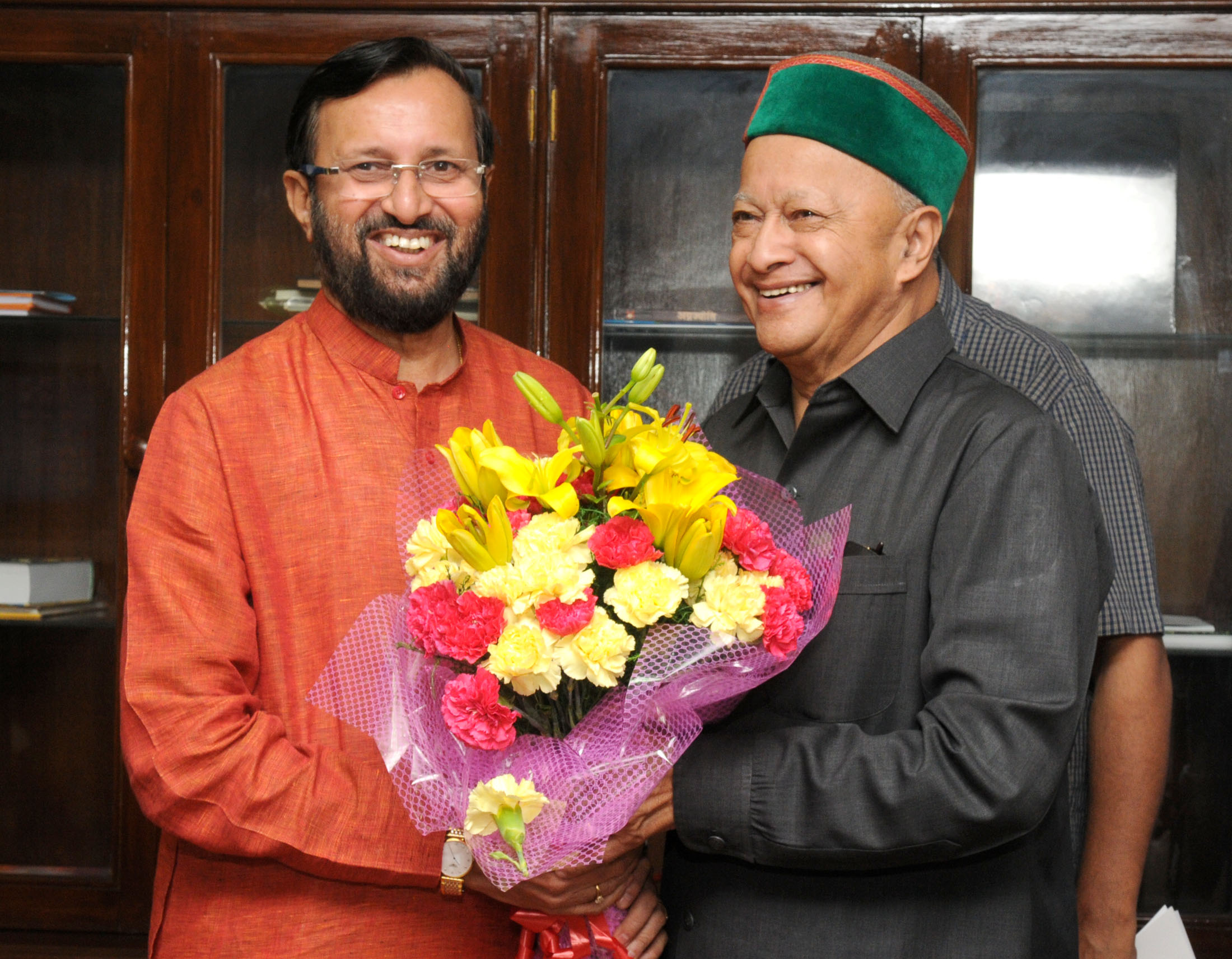
Virbhadra Singh meeting the Minister of State for Information and Broadcasting (Independent Charge), Environment, Forest and Climate Change (Independent Charge) and Parliamentary Affairs, Shri Prakash Javadekar, in New Delhi

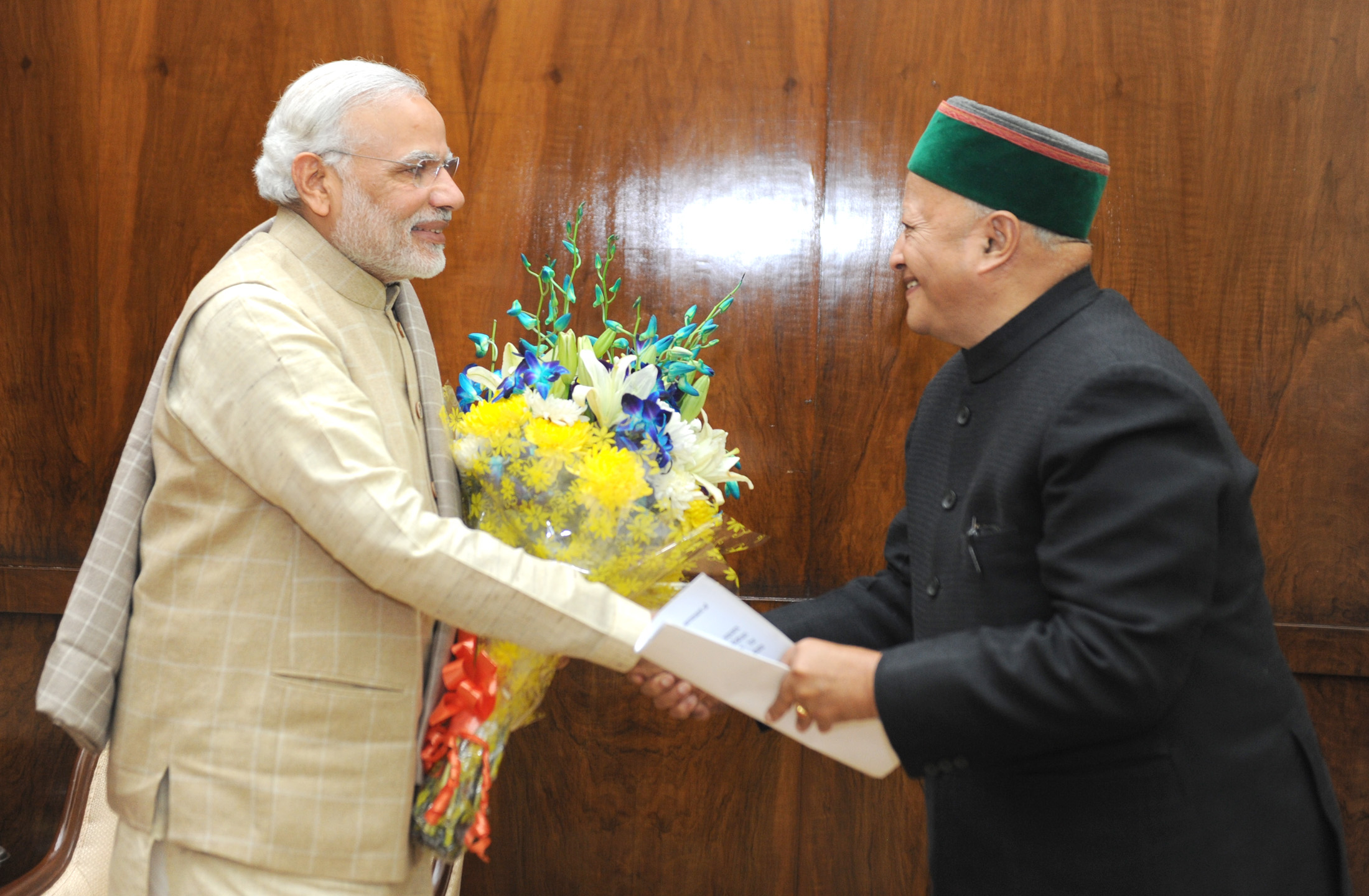
The Chief Minister of Himachal Pradesh, Shri Virbhadra Singh calling on the Prime Minister, Shri Narendra Modi, in New Delhi on 10 December 2015

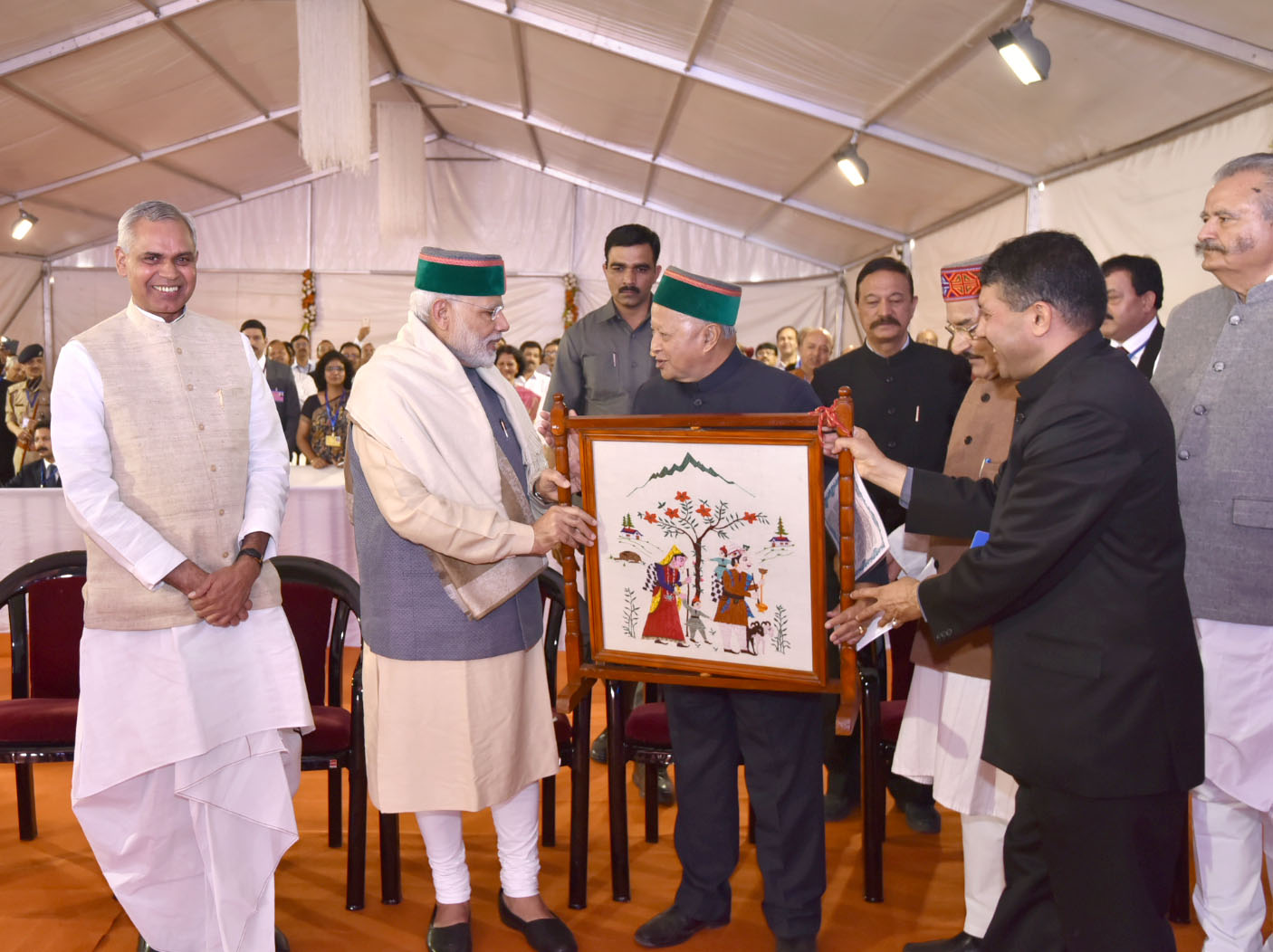
Narendra Modi being welcomed by the Governor of Himachal Pradesh, Shri Acharya Devvrat and the Chief Minister of Himachal Pradesh, Shri Virbhadra Singh, at a function, in Mandi, Himachal Pradesh 18 October 2016

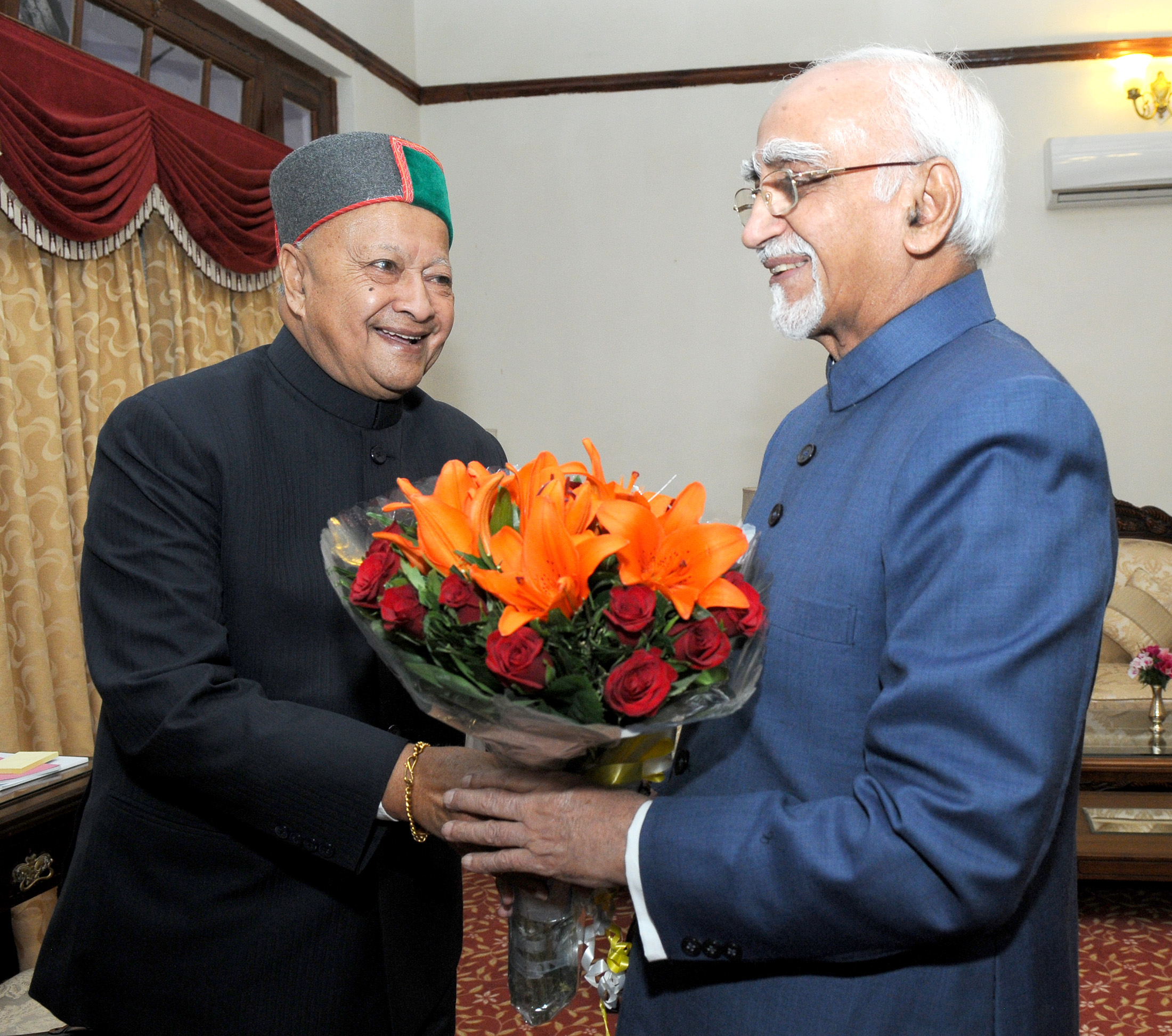
The Chief Minister of Himachal Pradesh, Shri Virbhadra Singh calling on the Vice President, Shri Mohd. Hamid Ansari, in Shimla, Himachal Pradesh on 9 June 2015

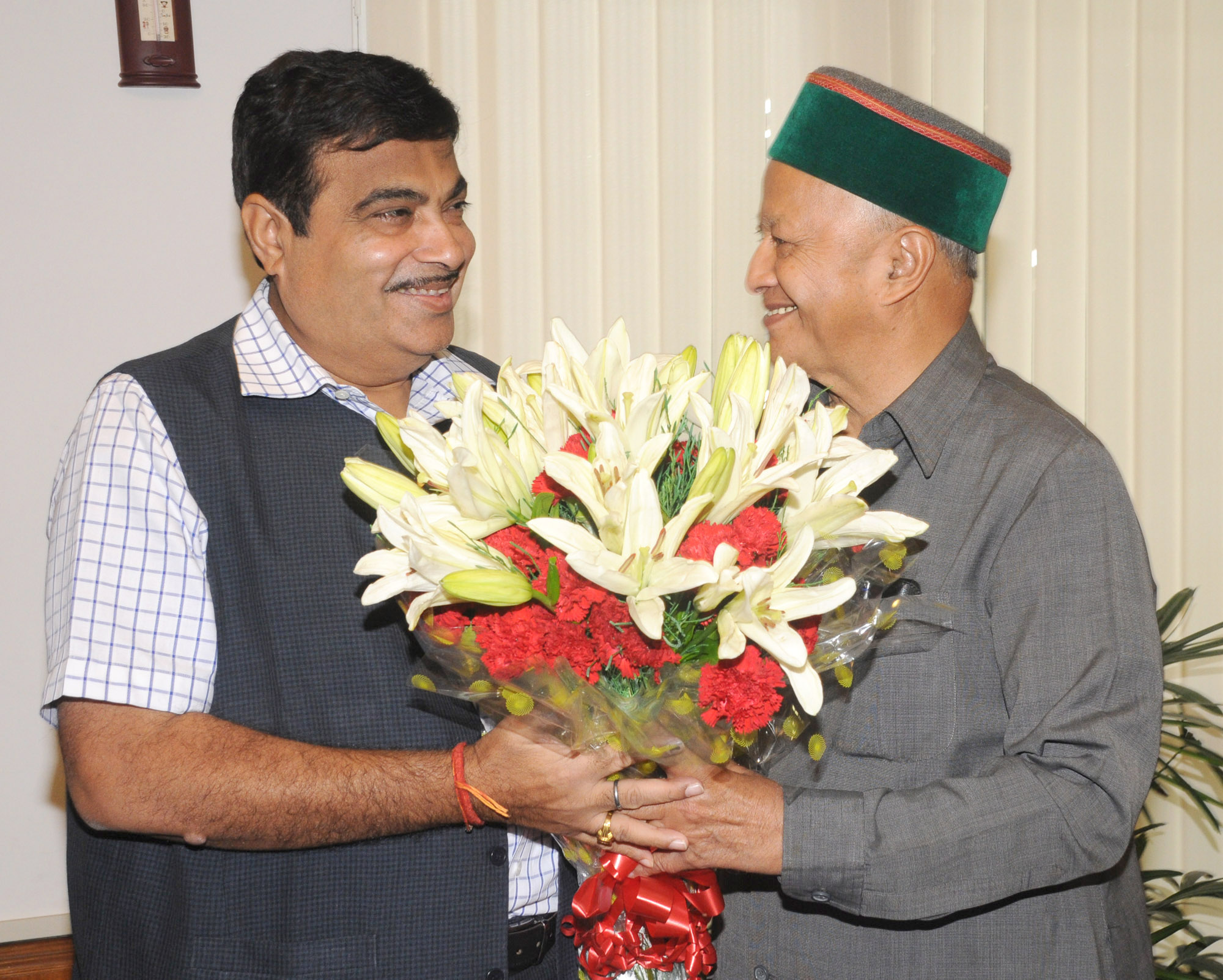
The Chief Minister of Himachal Pradesh, Shri Virbhadra Singh meeting the Union Minister for Road Transport & Highways and Shipping, Shri Nitin Gadkari, in New Delhi on 1 August 2014

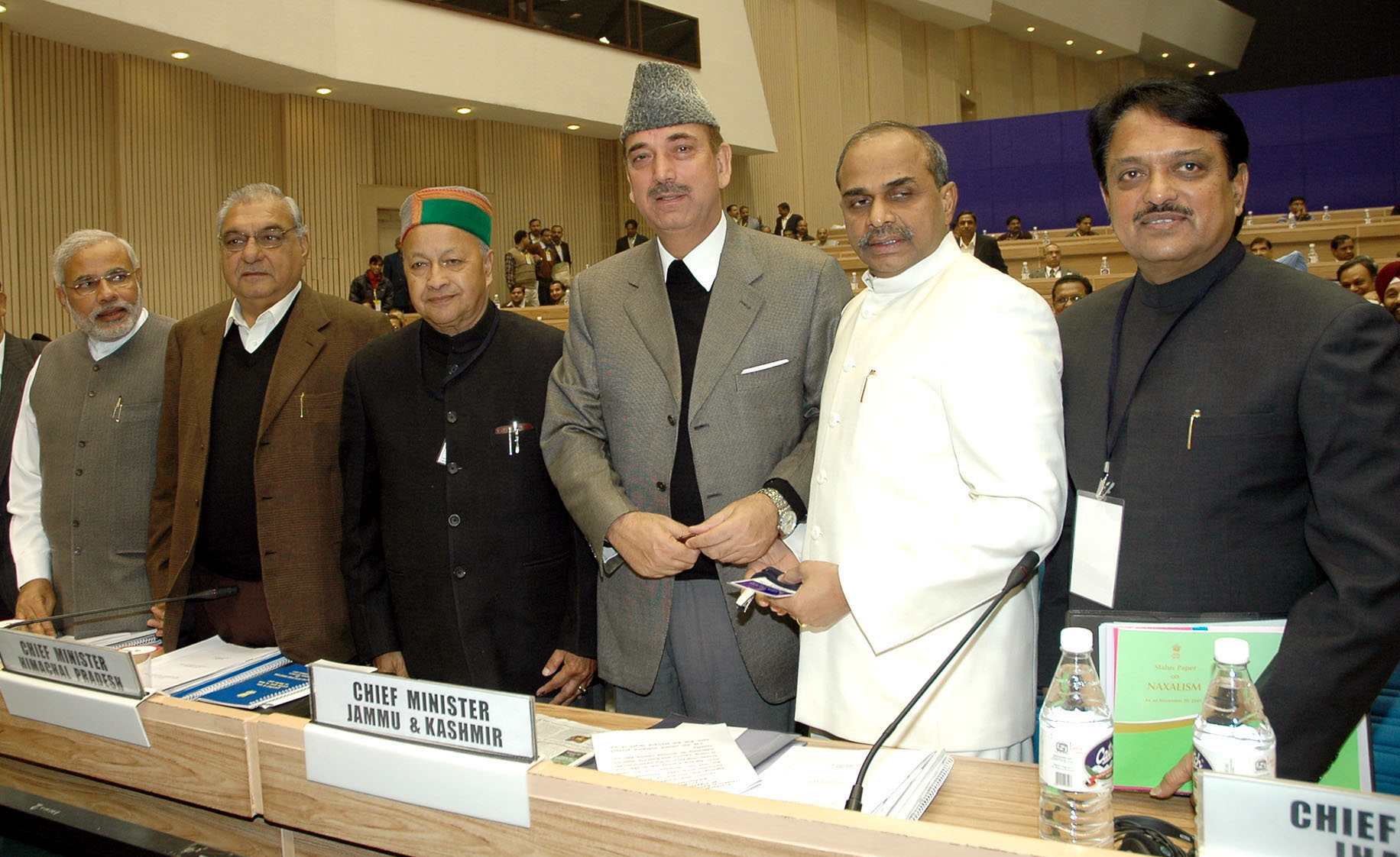
Vilasrao Deshmukh Maharashtra, Shri Y. S. Rajasekhara Reddy Andhra Pradesh, Shri Ghulam Nabi Azad J&K, Shri Virbhadra Singh, Himachal Pradesh

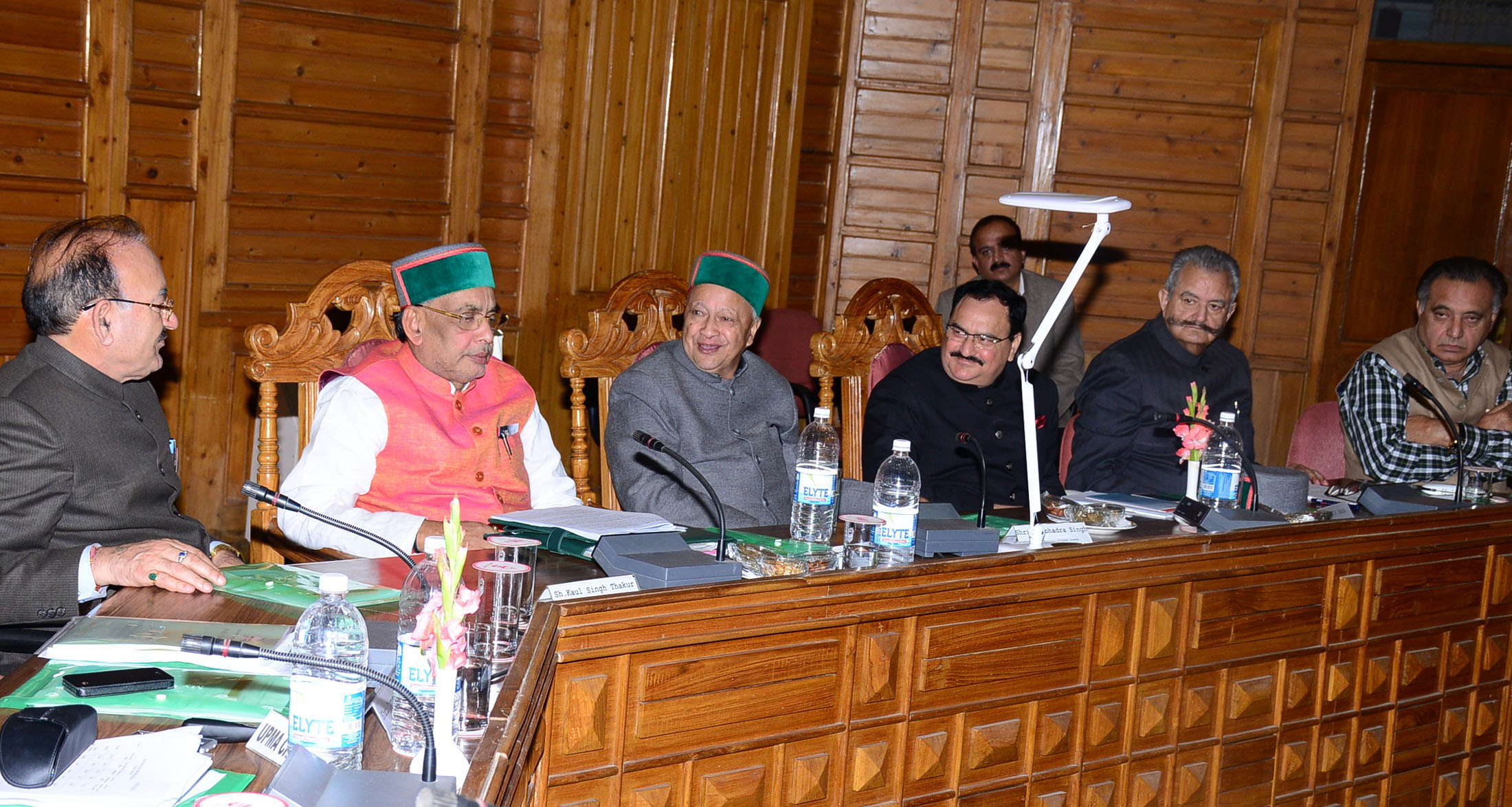
Jagat Prakash Nadda along with the Union Minister for Agriculture, Shri Radha Mohan Singh assessed the damages to crops during the unseasonal rains and hail in Himachal Pradesh

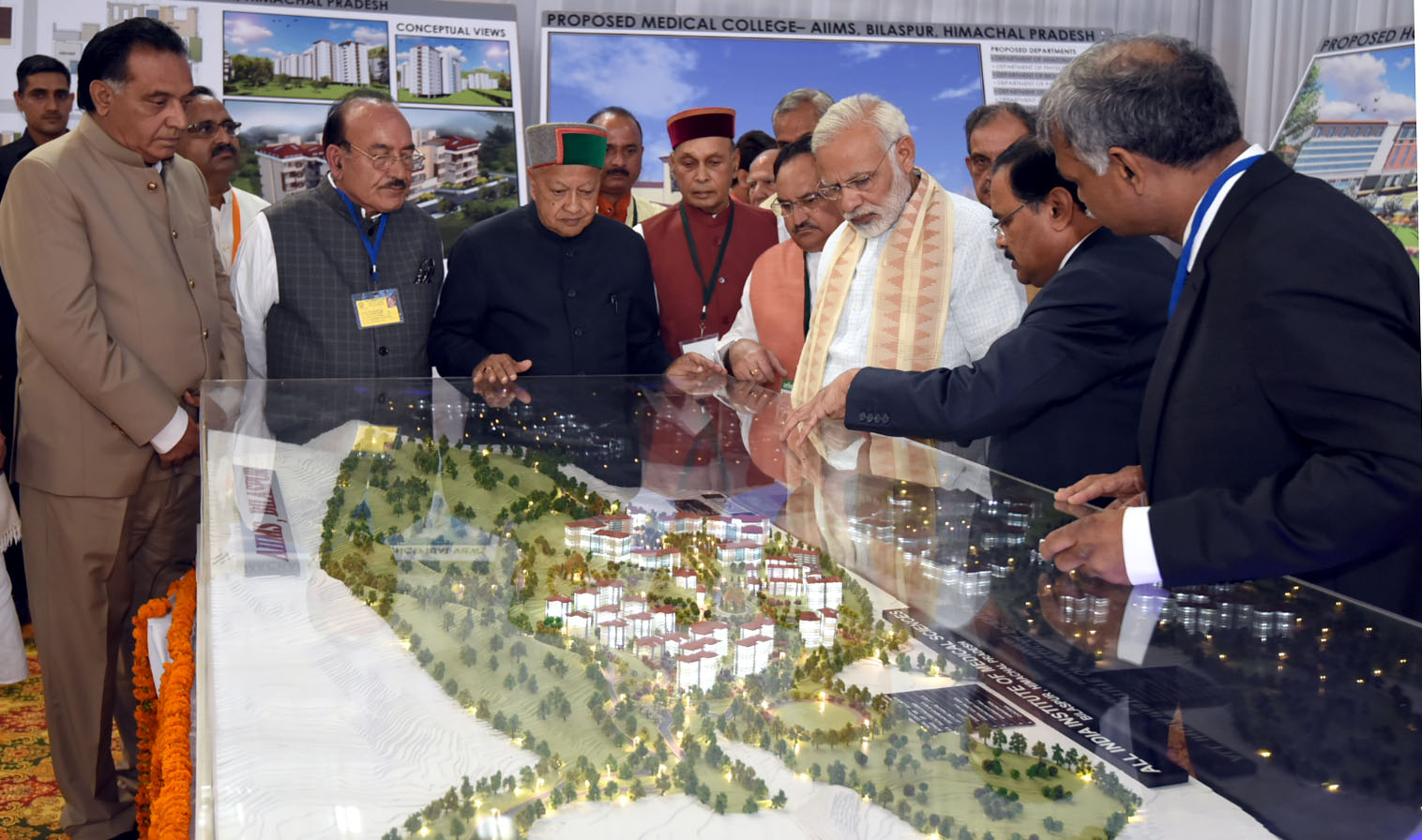
The Prime Minister, Shri Narendra Modi being briefed on structure of AIIMS, in Bilaspur, Himachal Pradesh

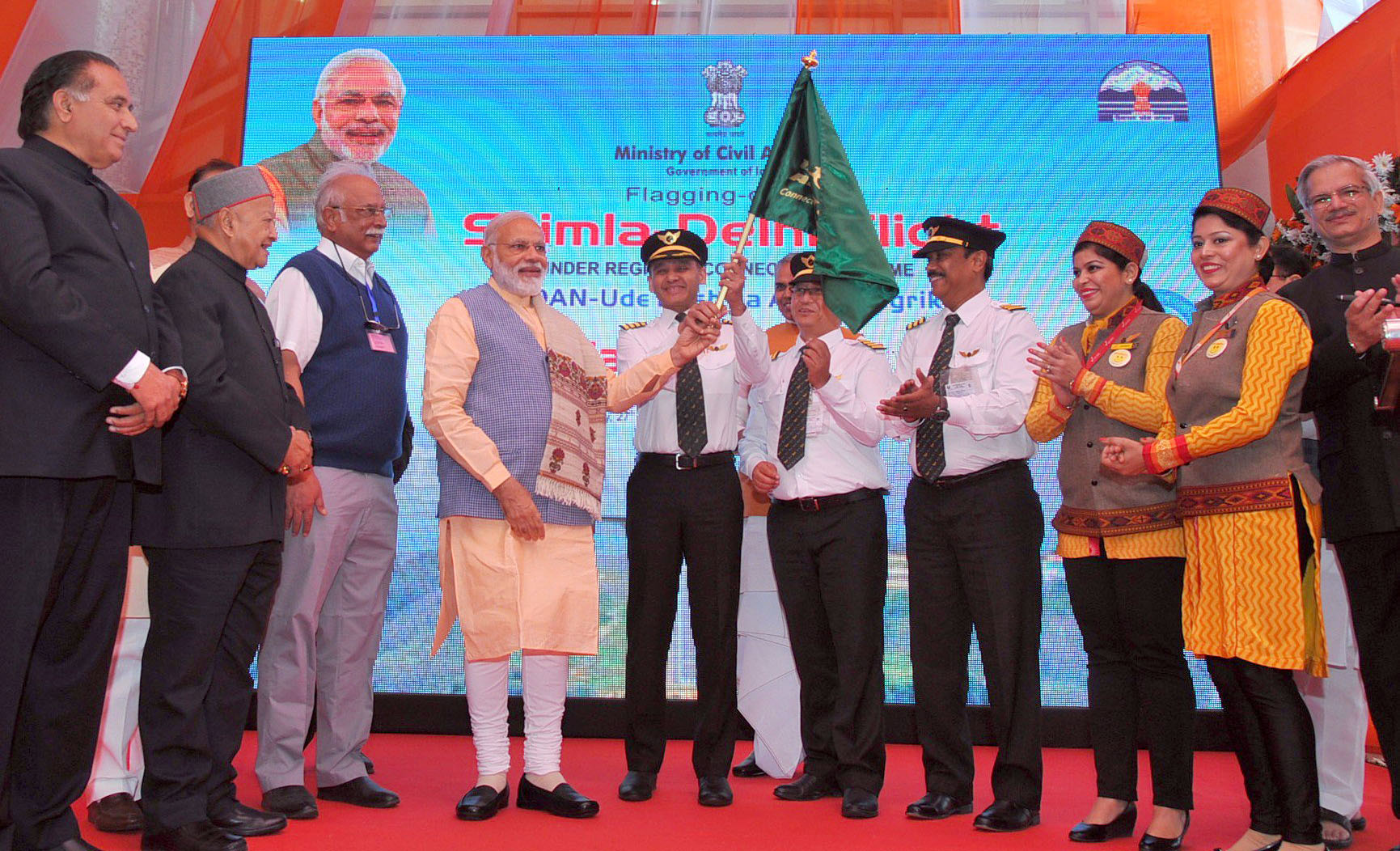
The Prime Minister, Shri Narendra Modi launching the UDAN – Regional Connectivity Scheme for Civil Aviation - by flagging-off the first UDAN flight from Shimla

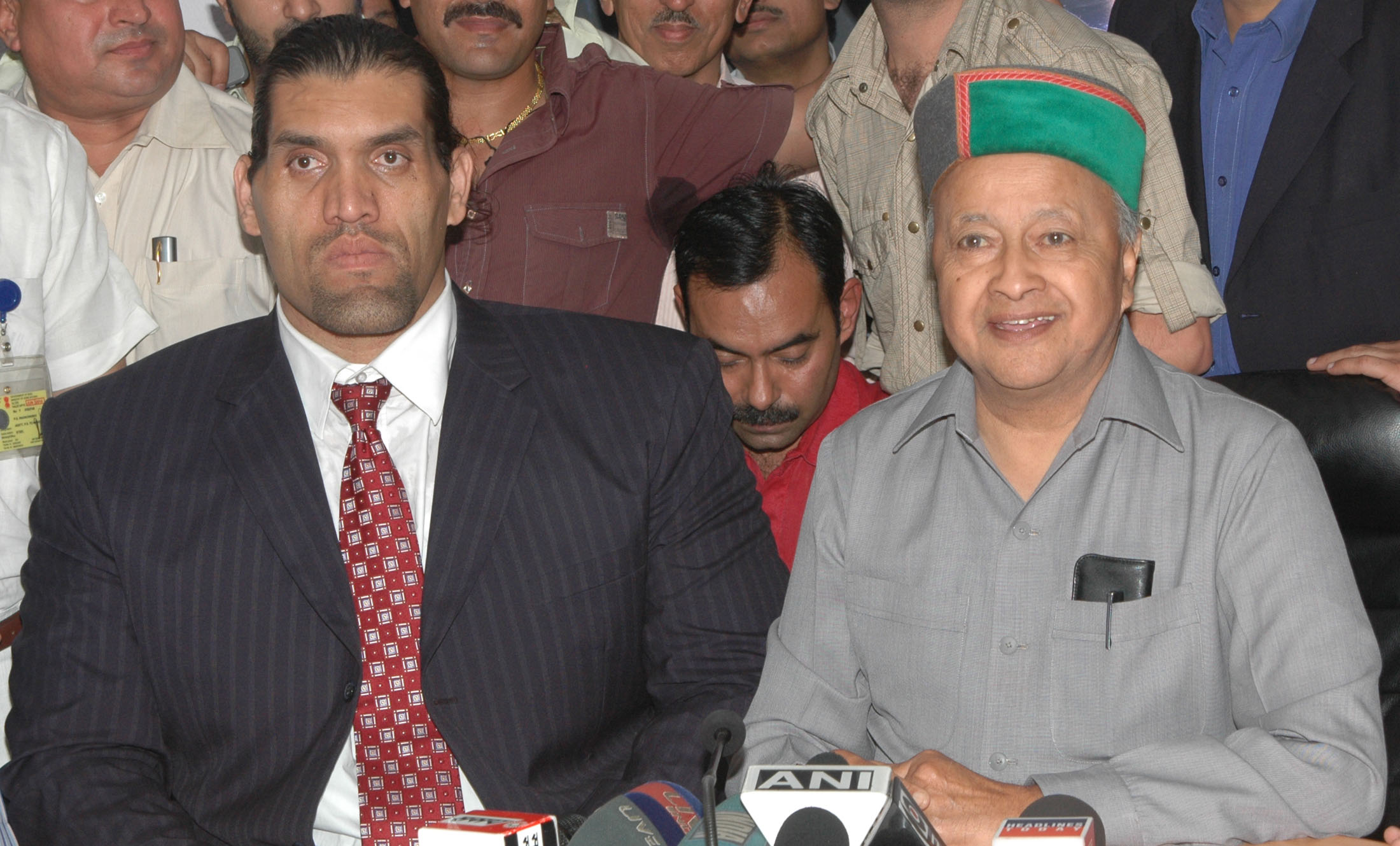
The world renowned WWF wrestler, Khali calls on the Union Minister of Steel, Shri Virbhadra Singh, in New Delhi on 10 November 2009

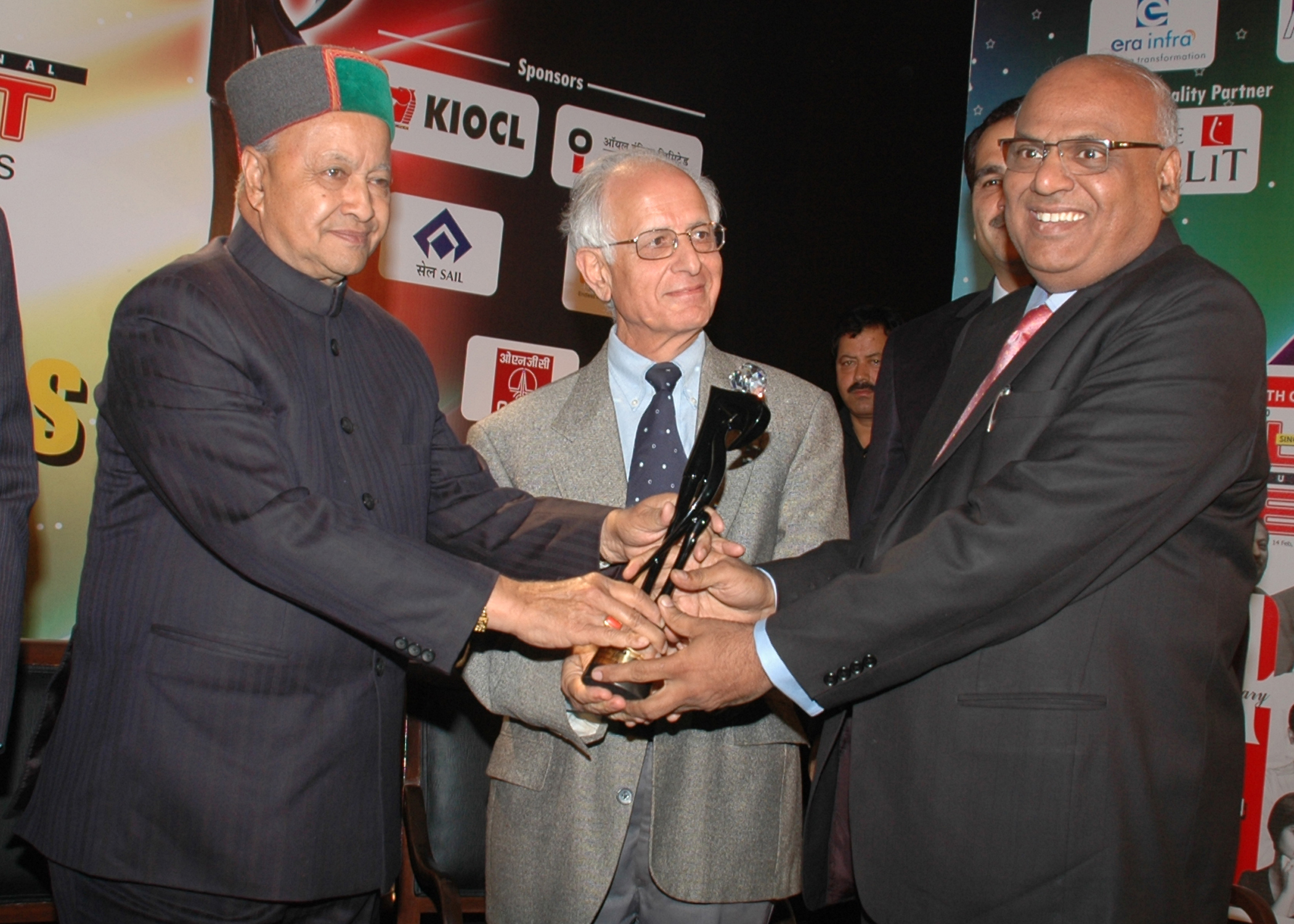
The Union Minister of Steel, Shri Virbhadra Singh presenting the 'Lifetime Achievement Award' of the Dalal Street Investment Journal PSU Awards-2010 to the Chairman, SAIL, Shri S.K. Roongta, in New Delhi on 6 April 2010

Lok Sabha
Preceded by Vacant	Member of Parliament for Shimla; 1962–1967	Succeeded by Partap Singh
Preceded by Lalit Sen	Member of Parliament for Mandi; 1971–1977	Succeeded by Ganga Singh
Preceded by Ganga Singh	Member of Parliament for Mandi; 1980–1984	Succeeded by Sukh Ram
Preceded by Pratibha Singh	Member of Parliament for Mandi; 2009–2013	Succeeded by Pratibha Singh
Political offices
Preceded by	Minister of State for Tourism, Civil Aviation; December 1976 – March 1977	Succeeded by
Preceded by	Minister of State for Industries; September 1982 – April 1983	Succeeded by
Preceded by Thakur Ram Lal	Chief Minister of Himachal Pradesh; 8 April 1983 – 5 March 1990	Succeeded by Shanta Kumar
Preceded by Shanta Kumar	Chief Minister of Himachal Pradesh; 3 December 1993 – 24 March 1998	Succeeded by Prem Kumar Dhumal
Preceded by Prem Kumar Dhumal	Chief Minister of Himachal Pradesh; 6 March 2003 – 30 December 2007	Succeeded by Prem Kumar Dhumal
Preceded by Ram Vilas Paswan	Minister of Steel; 28 May 2009 – 18 January 2011	Succeeded by Beni Prasad Verma
Preceded by Dinsha Patel	Minister of Micro, Small and Medium Enterprises; 19 January 2011 – 26 June 2012	Succeeded by Vilasrao Deshmukh
Preceded by Prem Kumar Dhumal	Chief Minister of Himachal Pradesh; 25 December 2012 – 27 December 2017	Succeeded by Jai Ram Thakur
