= Pamulaparthy =

Village in Telangana, India

Pamulparthy or also known as Pamulaparthi is a village in Medak District of Telangana, India. It is situated 85km away from district headquarter Sangareddy. Pathur is the gram panchayat of Pamulaparthi village.

Former Chief Minister of Telangana, K Chandrasekhar Rao sanctioned "five crores for taking up various works like drainage system in the village, CC roads for the village, bus stand, a community hall, and land for the poor for construction of houses."
