= Ram Swaroop Sharma =

Indian politician (1958–2021)

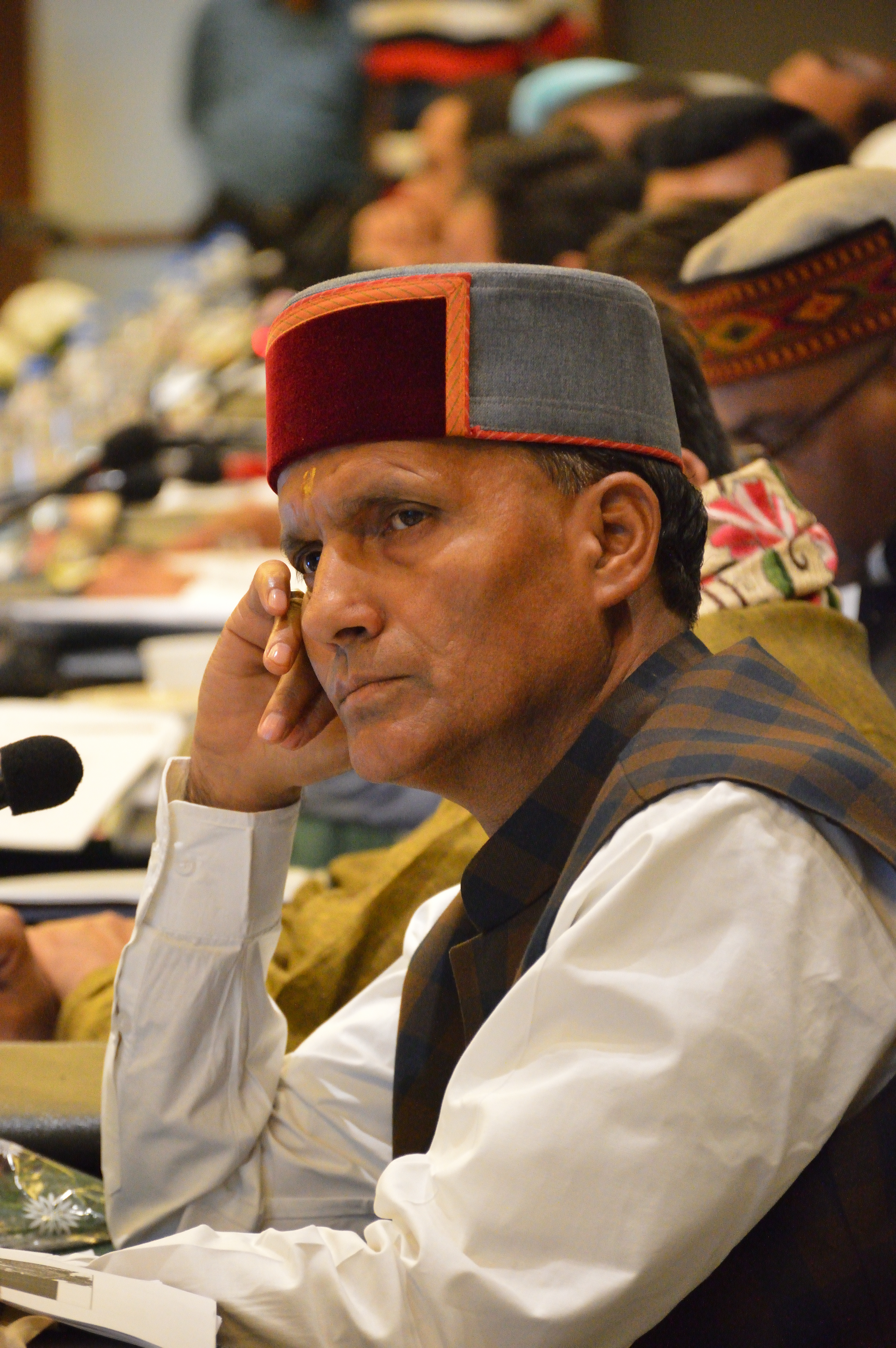
- Ram Swaroop Sharma during the Meeting of the Parliamentary Consultative Committee for the Ministry of Tourism and Ministry of Culture, Govt. of India, that held at the ITC Sonar hotel, 1 JBS Haldane Avenue, Kolkata.

Member of Parliament, Lok Sabha
- In office 16 May 2014 – 17 March 2021
- Preceded by: Pratibha Singh
- Succeeded by: Pratibha Singh
- Constituency: Mandi

Personal details
- Born: 10 June 1958 Jogindernagar, Himachal Pradesh, India
- Died: 17 March 2021 (aged 62) New Delhi, India
- Cause of death: Suicide by hanging
- Party: Bharatiya Janata Party
- Spouse: Smt. Champa Sharma
- Children: 3
- As of 15 December, 2016

Ram Swaroop Sharma (10 June 1958 – 17 March 2021) was an Indian politician and a member of the Bharatiya Janata Party (BJP). He was elected to the Lok Sabha in 2014 and 2019.

== Career ==
Born in Jogindernagar in the Mandi district of Himachal Pradesh. Sharma was the Organising Secretary of BJP (Mandi District) and was later elevated as Organizing Secretary of BJP (Himachal Pradesh). He also served as the Vice Chairman of the H.P. State Food and Civil Supplies Corporation.

He contested Mandi seat in 2014 Indian general election as BJP's candidate.

He won the Mandi seat in 2014 on BJP ticket beating Smt. Pratibha Singh of the INC by a margin of 39796 votes. The BJP swept the election in Himachal Pradesh winning all 4 Lok Sabha seats. He was re-elected in 2019.

== Death ==
He died on 17 March 2021 in New Delhi. He was found hanging in his room and the Delhi Police are investigating his death as a suicide.

Lok Sabha
Preceded by Pratibha Singh	Member of Parliament for Mandi; 2014 – 2021	Succeeded by Pratibha Singh
