= Imaliya Swaroop =

- village
- Location within Madhya Pradesh Location within India
- Coordinates: 23.6417991°N 77.4042102°E
- Country: India
- State: Madhya Pradesh
- District: Bhopal
- Tehsil: Berasia
- Elevation: 474 m (1,555 ft)

Population (2011)
  - Total: 439
- Time zone: UTC+5:30 (IST)
- ISO 3166 code: IN-MP
- 2011 census code: 482230

Imaliya Swaroop is a village in the Bhopal district of Madhya Pradesh, India. It is located in the Berasia tehsil.

== Demographics ==
According to the 2011 census of India, Imaliya Swaroop has 99 households. The effective literacy rate (i.e. the literacy rate of population excluding children aged 6 and below) is 70.6%.

Demographics (2011 Census)
	Total	Male	Female
Population	439	233	206
Children aged below 6 years	75	38	37
Scheduled caste	67	33	34
Scheduled tribe	14	6	8
Literates	257	151	106
Workers (all)	204	113	91
Main workers (total)	80	60	20
Main workers: Cultivators	27	26	1
Main workers: Agricultural labourers	37	23	14
Main workers: Household industry workers	0	0	0
Main workers: Other	16	11	5
Marginal workers (total)	124	53	71
Marginal workers: Cultivators	12	7	5
Marginal workers: Agricultural labourers	98	39	59
Marginal workers: Household industry workers	0	0	0
Marginal workers: Others	14	7	7
Non-workers	235	120	115
