= Swarup =

Swarup may refer to:

- Jagendra Swarup (1949–2014), MLC for six consecutive terms, educationist, advocate
- Virendra Swarup, member and chairman of the Legislative Council of Uttar Pradesh, India
- Shanti Swarup Bhatnagar (1894–1955), Indian scientist
- Swarup Kishan (1930–1992), Indian Test cricket umpire
- Gopal Swarup Pathak (1896–1982), the fourth Vice President of India (1969–1974)
- Raghunandan Swarup Pathak (1924–2007), the 18th Chief Justice of India
- Swarup Singh (disambiguation), several people
- Anand Swarup (died 1937), guru from the Dayal Bagh branch of the Radha Soami tradition
- Anoop Swarup (born 1959), academic, social activist, ecologist, peace exponent
- Dhirendra Swarup, nominated as FPSBI chairman
- Govind Swarup, radio astronomer
- Ram Swarup (1920–1998), independent Hindu thinker and prolific author
- Shri Mohan Swarup (born 1918), Member of Parliament for several terms
- Vikas Swarup Indian novelist and diplomat
