= Shimla Rural Assembly constituency =

Legislative Assembly constituency in Himachal Pradesh State, India

Coordinates: 31.08°N 77.11°E

Shimla Rural
- Constituency No. 64 for the Himachal Pradesh Legislative Assembly

Constituency details
- Country: India
- Region: North India
- State: Himachal Pradesh
- District: Shimla
- Lok Sabha constituency: Shimla
- Established: 2008
- Total electors: 78,294
- Reservation: None

Member of Legislative Assembly
- 14th Himachal Pradesh Legislative Assembly
- Incumbent Vikramaditya Singh
- Party: Indian National Congress
- Elected year: 2022

Shimla Rural Assembly constituency is one of the 68 constituencies in the Himachal Pradesh Legislative Assembly of Himachal Pradesh a northern state of India. Shimla Rural is also part of Shimla Lok Sabha constituency.

== Members of Legislative Assembly ==
Election	Member	Picture	Party
2012	Virbhadra Singh		Indian National Congress
2017	Vikramaditya Singh		Indian National Congress
2022	Vikramaditya Singh		Indian National Congress

== Election results ==
=== Assembly Election 2022 ===
2022 Himachal Pradesh Legislative Assembly election: Shimla Rural
Party	Candidate	Votes	%	±%
INC	Vikramaditya Singh	35,269	60.19%	▲7.58
BJP	Ravi Kumar Mehta	21,409	36.54%	▼6.99
NOTA	Nota	293	0.50%	▼0.28
Margin of victory		13,860	23.65%	▲14.57
Turnout		58,597	74.84%	▲0.10
Registered electors		78,294		▲8.87
INC hold		Swing	▲7.58	

=== Assembly Election 2017 ===
2017 Himachal Pradesh Legislative Assembly election: Shimla Rural
Party	Candidate	Votes	%	±%
INC	Vikramaditya Singh	28,275	52.60%	▼18.67
BJP	Dr. Pramod Sharma	23,395	43.53%	▲21.59
Independent	M.D. Sharma	668	1.24%	New
NOTA	None of the Above	420	0.78%	New
Swabhiman Party	Kushal Raj	325	0.60%	New
Margin of victory		4,880	9.08%	▼40.26
Turnout		53,750	74.74%	▲15.42
Registered electors		71,915		▲5.25
INC hold		Swing	▼18.67	

=== Assembly Election 2012 ===
2012 Himachal Pradesh Legislative Assembly election: Shimla Rural
Party	Candidate	Votes	%	±%
INC	Virbhadra Singh	28,892	71.28%	New
BJP	Ishwar Rohal	8,892	21.94%	New
Independent	Prem Chand Thakur	1,171	2.89%	New
HLC	Gaurav Sharma	745	1.84%	New
Himachal Swabhiman Party	Kushal Raj	491	1.21%	New
BSP	Ravi Kumar	232	0.57%	New
Margin of victory		20,000	49.34%	
Turnout		40,534	59.32%	
Registered electors		68,326		
INC win (new seat)				

== See also ==
- Shimla
- Shimla district
- List of constituencies of Himachal Pradesh Legislative Assembly
