= Vanjari caste =

Farmer castes in Western India

Vanjari
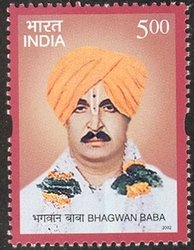
- Shree Sant Bhagwan Baba
- Classification: Denotified Tribe in Maharashtra.
- Gotra: Shaunaka, Atri, Gautam, Kashyap, Bharadwaj, Vashistha, Parashar, Yadav
- Veda: Rigveda, Yajurveda
- Kuladevta (male): Khandoba
- Kuladevi (female): Renuka Mata
- Guru: Sant Bhagwan Baba
- Religions: Hinduism
- Languages: Marathi, Kannada, Telugu, Hindi
- Country: India
- Original state: Rajasthan
- Populated states: Maharashtra; Karnataka; Rajasthan • Gujarat • Madhya Pradesh • Haryana • Punjab, • Himachal Pradesh • Uttarakhand • Uttar Pradesh • Bihar
- Region: Northern India; Eastern India; Western India
- Ethnicity: Indo-Aryan
- Population: 78,00,000
- Family names: Bangar, Sanap, Munde
- Feudal title: Deshmukh, Patil, Naik, Zamindar, Mahajan
- Notable members: Gopinath Munde
- Related groups: Banjara, Banjari
- Historical grouping: Rajputana
- Disputed grouping: Banjara, Banjari
- Status: Backward caste
- Reservation (Education): Maharashtra : Denotified Tribe :Other Backward Class
- Reservation (Employment): Maharashtra : Denotified Tribe :Other Backward Class
- Reservation (Other): Karnataka: ST; Andhra Pradesh: ST Telangana: ST Odisha: ST

The Vanjari (also spelled Wanjara, Banjiri, Wanjari or Vanjiri) are a caste community found primarily in the Indian states of Maharashtra, Karnataka, Telangana, and parts of Madhya Pradesh and Rajasthan. Traditionally associated with trade, transport of goods, and agriculture, the Vanjaris are recognized as a distinct social group with a historical role in commerce and local administration.

== Origin ==
Vanjari Caste Origin can be traced back AD 900 - AD 1120 AD Following are Significant Archaeological Record Traced the origin of vanjaris

=== Ladlai stone inscription of Jayapala ===
The earliest known epigraphic reference to the Vanjari (Vanajaraka) community occurs in the Rādlai Stone Inscription of Jayapala, dated Vikrama Saṃvat 1202 (AD 1145), discovered near Nadol in Rajasthan and published in Epigraphia Indica, Vol. IX. The inscription records that the Vanajarakas (Vanjari merchants) of Abhinavapuri, Badari, and Nagdali had organized themselves into a guild (deśī), and under the authority of the ruler's envoy Rajadeva, agreed to levy contributions for the sustenance of ascetics in a Jain temple of Mahavira. A tax of two rupees per twenty loads of bullocks and one rupee per cartload of commodities was stipulated. This reference establishes the presence of the Vanjari as a distinct trading community in western India by the mid-12th century.

=== Copper-plate grant of Tribhuvanapaladeva ===
Additional epigraphic references occur under variant spellings such as vanajāraka (Epigraphia Indica, No. XI) and vanjyaraka in a copper-plate grant of Tribhūvanapāladeva, where they are described as merchants whose hereditary calling was the carrying of grain on bullocks. These records establish the Vanjari as a distinct merchant-transporting caste in western India by the 12th century CE.

== Etymology ==
The name Vanjari is believed to derive from the Sanskrit word vaṇij (merchant or trader), reflecting the community's early occupational association with trade and transportation. Colonial records and regional gazetteers often describe them as carriers of grain, salt, and other commodities across long distances using pack bullocks.

- Vaṇij (Merchant): The term Vanjari can be traced to the Sanskrit word vaṇij, which refers to a merchant or trader. This is consistent with the community's historical occupation of vanjari.
- Vaṇacara (Wanderer in the Forest): Another theory suggests that Vanjari is a corrupt form of vaṇacara, meaning "one who wanders in the forest". This reflects the nomadic lifestyle of the community.

=== Banjara and Vanjari differences ===
- Vanjari have adopted agriculture as their main occupation, while the Banjara are still nomads.
- Banjaras follow the Tanda Culture and are included in the list of denotified tribes. But Vanjari are farmers and they are similar to Kunbis
- Vanjari speech is Marathi while Banjara speak Lamani or Banjari Language

== Culture ==
The Vanjari community, traditionally associated with trading and agriculture, possesses a distinctive culture shaped by its occupational history, clan organization, festivals, and social customs. Their culture reflects a blend of agrarian life, martial traditions, and devotional practices, rooted in the regions of Maharashtra, Telangana, Karnataka, and Madhya Pradesh where they are concentrated

=== Marriage ===
Marriage among the Vanjaris follows traditional exogamous clan rules. Cross-cousin marriage is not permitted. Divorce is allowed, and widow remarriage as well as levirate are socially sanctioned. A fine is levied on a widow if she does not marry her deceased husband's brother.

=== Social Customs ===
In funerary practice, married individuals are cremated, while the unmarried are buried. The community was historically associated with the cattle trade, preferring the tall and long-legged Lamani bullock as a pack animal, though many have since taken up settled agriculture.

=== Dressing ===
Men traditionally dress like Marathas, while women's attire resembles that of Malwa and Rajput women. Vanjari women are regarded as skilled needleworkers and are known for their embroidery work on garments and men's blankets. Their diet includes fish and the flesh of sheep, goat, hare, and deer. They also consume liquor and a distinctive opium preparation called kusumba.

=== Festivals and Gods ===
- Worships They worship the usual local and Brahmanic deities but their house god is Khandoba.They hold the sixth of Margashirsh in November–December sacred to Khandoba, and on that day, before eating, offer him new millet and onions

=== Rituals ===
- Their staple food is millet, pulse, and vegetables. The men but not the women eat flesh and at marriages flesh is forbidden even to men.

== Regional distribution ==
In the early twentieth century, the Vanjaris were reported mainly from the Central Provinces of India, particularly in districts such as Nagpur, Betul, Chhindwara, and Wardha. They were also found in adjoining areas of Berar and the Deccan, where many had taken up agriculture after giving up their traditional occupation as traders and transporters.

By the late nineteenth and early twentieth centuries, census records noted significant concentrations of the community in the Central Provinces, with additional populations spread into Hyderabad State, Berar, and parts of present-day Maharashtra and Madhya Pradesh.

== Historical distribution ==
=== British India (1881 AD) ===
The Wanjaris/Vanjari communities total Population 767,177; The largest proportion, 521,882, is found in Madras Presidency; Hyderabad Presidency contains 108,644; Bombay Presidency, 108, 359; Berar Province, 27,495; and the Central Provinces, 797.

=== Maharashtra ===
Vanjari Community Chiefly concentrated in Aurangabad, Beed, Nanded, Buldhana, Latur, Jalna adjoining districts.

A settlement of Vanjari community is called vadi. Each settlement has its hereditary headman known as naik. He is responsible for the protection of the group and administration of justice. He is a representative and arbitrator in caste disputes and directs the movements of the caravan while travelling. A fresh election is made when the hereditary naik family ceases to have a representative.

- Dhule :According to District Gazetteer of dhule Vanjari community people originally carriers, are very numerous goods in Jamner, Varangaon, Dharangaon, Parola, Erandol, and Dhulia. At present there is no noticeable difference between them and ordinary Kunbis. As there are Vanjari Patils in Jamner. they have probably long been settled as cultivators.

=== Karnataka ===
present in border regions with historical links to caravan trade routes.

=== Rajasthan ===
Oral traditions connect the community with service under Rajput rulers such as Maharana Pratap.

== Social and cultural status ==
=== Historical ===
In 1880, Mr. Kitts prepared a table showing the relative social position of major castes in Berar Province, distinguishing between those of "good" and "inferior" standing. According to this account, Brahmins were placed at the top of the hierarchy, followed by Kayasthas, Prabhus, and trading castes such as Wanis. Agricultural groups such as Kunbis and Gavlis occupied a middle position. Within this framework, the Vanjari community was described as a well-to-do and respected caste engaged in agriculture. They were noted as being distinct from the Banjara

=== Durga Devi (AD 1396 - AD 1407) ===
The Vanjari story of the great Durgadevi famine, which lasted from 1396 to 1407, is that it was named from Durga a Lad Vanjari woman, who had amassed great wealth and owned a million pack bullocks, which she used in bringing grain from Nepal, Burmah, and China. She distributed the grain among the starving people and gained the honourable title of ' Mother of the World, Jagachi Mata.

== Vanjari gotra and clans ==
The Vanjari community is divided into several traditional *kuli* (clans), each associated with a Vedic tradition (*Veda*), a *gotra* (lineage), a *devak* (totem), and a set of surnames (*upanāva*).

No		Clan (Kuli)	Veda tradition	Gotra	Devak (Totem)	Common surnames!
Lad Vanjari	1	Gambhirrao (Shirke)	Rigveda	Shaunaka	Unknown	Katale, Kaltope, Kukde, Korale, Kalushe, Kavale, Kharmate (Kharmate), Khillare/Khilare, Gandhile (Gandile), Gandas, Gawate, Gas, Gopalghare, Gopalkar, Gomash, Gomase, Charate, Chabukswar, Jare (Jare), Damale, Dukare (Durke), Dhole (Dohale), Tambde, Tadge, Darade, Nakade, Naikwade, Nagargoje, Nagare, Palave, Pote, Pakhare, Kunde, Funde, Phatkal, Phad, Bikkad, Bargaje, Neharkar, Binawade (Binawade), Bhange, Bedade (Bedade), Barke, Bondre (Bondra), Laman, Lendkhaire (Ledkhaire), Lade, Lodag, Landge, Vare, Sangle, Laruk (Saruk), Shelke, Shekde, Hange, Badche, Balge, Gambire, Shekde, Funde, Eid, Bondare, Jawle, Kaje, Kale, Dhundale, Kapse, Gande, Pawal, Thorve, Thorat, Shinde, Pathar, Unhale, Parkhad
Lad Vanjari	2	Prataprao (Mudha, Munda Bachchav, Badshah), Dhampal	Yajurveda	Atri	Unknown	Arbuj, Katare, Katkhed, Kankase, Katane (Katane), Katkhade, Katkade, Khokle, Khadavgale, Khedkar, Khandare, Garje, Golar, Gandve, Golhar, Gadale ( Gajdale), Gharjale, Chaure (Chavere), Chepte (Chepte), Thobare (Thobare), Thule, Dhule, Dhgar, Tagar, Tole, Toge, Dahiphale, Dagdakhair, Dhas, Dhupare, Nehale, Palavde, Patait (Padhait), Bade (Badhe), Bokare, Balte, Batwade (Vatwade), Vadne (Badne), Batule, Bhatane, Munde, Mundhe, Morale, Madkar, Misal, Lakde (Ladke), Lohare, Lavhare, Holambe, Vagadi (Bagadi), Vighne, Sathe, Sose (Soshe, Zhause), Sonpir, Satbhaye, Shirsath, Kanthale, Sirsath, Ghodke, Gawte, Chaure, Chikhalbhide, Bombde, Jase, Bolambe, Dapkar, Khakunje, Dighe, Habde, Sakhare, Satbhai
Lad Vanjari	3	Chandrarao (Maurya / More)	Yajurveda	Gautama Maharishi	Unknown	Igare (Ighare), Umbre, Kakad, Lahane, Sanap, Kharde
Lad Vanjari	4	Garudrao	Rigveda	Kashyapa	Unknown	Andhale, Tandale, Kagne (Kangane), Kendra, Kusapate, Bongane (Gongane), Gholve, Chaudar (Chaudhar), Jadhavar, Dudhevarpe, Bhendkar (Bhendekar), Maid (Maind), Gomane, Bhokare
Lad Vanjari	5	Pawar Rao (Pawar / Pravar)	Yajurveda	Bharadvaja	Unknown	Amble (Ambale), Abale, Ugalmugle, Kadpe, Chipate, Bodke, Bargal, Musale, Latpatte, Vanve, Vinchu, Pandit
Lad Vanjari	6	Jagtaprao (Jagtap)	Yajurveda	Kanva	Unknown	Kande/Kayande, Kute, Gangavane, Daund, Dhatrak, Dhayatidak (Dhayatdak), Murkute, Rakh
Lad Vanjari	7	Bhalerao (Yadav/Sahdev descendant)	Yajurveda	Parashara	Unknown	Khade, Chole, Dongre, Bangar
Lad Vanjari	8	Prachandrao (Jadhav)	Rigveda	Kaushik	Unknown	Awhad, Kale, Jayabhai (Jayabhai), Dapurkar, Dombale, Indurkar, Bondar, Shintre, Hadpe (Hadpe), Hadbe, Shatre
Lad Vanjari	9	Bhagwantrao	Rigveda	Jamadagni	Unknown	Kalvaze (Kalvanze), Kaluse ( Kalushe), Tate, Mangar (Magar), Phad, Kade
Lad Vanjari	10	Balwantrao	Rigveda	Kashyapa	Unknown	Ipar, Chakor, Dargunde (Dargude), Latte, Pohche, Hemade, Lodhe, Ugle
Lad Vanjari	11	Tavarrao / Tavarrao (Taur)	Yajurveda	Kashyapa	Unknown	Kekan, Thorve (Thore), Bhabad, Manavate, Mante, Bore
Lad Vanjari	12	Ankushrao	Rigveda	Kashyapa	Unknown	Garkal, Taklas (Takras), Doifode (Doifodi), Dole, Varshid, Hodshil
Lad Vanjari	13	Sukhsarao	Rigveda	Kashyapa	Unknown	Katkade, Karade (Karad, Ka-Had), Khaple, Khandvekar, Gutte, Gandal, Chakne, Nimonkar, Pansare, Burkule (Burukule), Malv (Malve), Sable, Sonawane, Khambadekar, Chakne
Lad Vanjari	14	Patangrao	Rigveda	Kashyapa	Unknown	Aghav, Gujar, Dighole, Shevgaonkar
Lad Vanjari	15	Panchmukhrao	Yajurveda	Kapila (Kashyapa)	Unknown	Qatar, Kapse, Kirtane, Jaware, Dolse, Dhakne, Bodale (Dodale), Lokhande, Wagh, Zade
Lad Vanjari	16	Haibatrao / Haibrao	Rigveda	Kashyapa	Unknown	Kedar, Gamane (Gamani), Gabhane, Gore
Lad Vanjari	17	Mankarrao / Manakrao	Rigveda	Vasishtha	Unknown	Chate, Vaibhse (Vaibse), Paymashe / Paymase, Pawashe
Lad Vanjari	18	Yashwantrao (Gaikwad)	Rigveda	Kashyapa	Unknown	Gaikwad, Gonge (Goge), Ghuge, Tare, Devaranga, Kurade, Khare, Kharate
Lad Vanjari	19	Devrai	Rigveda	Vasishtha	Unknown	Ilag, Ghule, Vadne, Dhule, Bhadg
Lad Vanjari	20	Damade	Rigveda	Shandilya	Unknown	Hushe, Hulule (Hulavale), Lang, Damade, Navale, Pawar
Lad Vanjari	21	Mouths	Rigveda	(Manaka) (Kashyapa)	Unknown	Tonde
Lad Vanjari	22	Sultanrao / Chavan	Rigveda	Pulastya	Unknown	Kapade, Kale, Kali, Geete, Budhwant, Shep
Lad Vanjari	23	Tidke (Tilke)	Rigveda	Durvasa	Unknown	Tidke
Lad Vanjari	24	Lad	Rigveda	Mandavya	Unknown	Lad
Lad Vanjari	25	Vedas	Rigveda	Kashyapa	Unknown	Hushe, Huluke, Lang, Damade, Navale, Pawar Lad Kshatriyas are – Ghayat, Ghyar, Malu, Umte, Ombase, Ambekar, Akhade, Karbhari Nimbhorkar, Kayande Gadale, Karle, Gangone, Kaluse, Kanthale, Kankate, Kapde, Karkhele, Kanhere, Khot, Khurpade, Khogre, Jange, Chaudhary, Jawale, Tadas, Pathar, Targe, Dahatondae, Naik, Paul, Palave, Pandharmise, Bhagat, Lamb, Borgaonkar, Gopa, Varade, Vanjari, Vaidya, Salve, Vyavare, Sonune, Sankhe, Surpade, Helambakar, Ghoge, Aher, Ugle, Mutdak, Morge, Murtadkar, Tapre

Note: The table cover the all vanjari caste clans and surname. Each clan has multiple associated surnames, and variations exist across regions.

=== Reservation status ===
- Scheduled Tribe (ST): The Vanjari community is classified as a Scheduled Tribe in several states, including Odisha, Telangana, Karnataka, Andhra Pradesh, Chhattisgarh, and Jharkhand.
- Nomadic Tribe (NT-D): In Maharashtra, the Vanjari caste has been included in the Nomadic Tribes (NT-D) category since 1993, as per state government classification. which is part of Other Back Work Caste
- Other Backward Class (OBC): In states such as Rajasthan, Madhya Pradesh, Gujarat, and Uttar Pradesh, the Vanjari community is listed under the Other Backward Class (OBC) category.
- Inclusion of Vanjari Caste in The List of Vimukta jatis (Nomadic Tribe) : The Tribal Research and Training Institute, conducted a detailed survey, of 13 villages in Palghar Tehsil, with a view to find out whether Wanjaris who are living predominantly in that area are the sub-groups of Banjara Community or otherwise. The following 13 Wanjari villages were visited: (1) Pam-Tembhi, (6) Vengani, (11) Maswan, (2) Kumbhawali, (7) Kurgaon, (12) Dukatan, and (3) Murabe, (8) Dapoli, (13) Bandhan. (4) Boisar, (9) Morekuran, (5) Parmali, (10) Kolgaon, which suggested inclusion of Vanjari Caste in Nomadic Tribe

== Notable people ==
=== Spiritual ===
- Sant Bhagwan Baba: Revered spiritual leader within the Vanjari community, known for social and religious guidance.
- Namdev Shastri Sanap: Prominent saint associated with the Vanjari community, contributing to local devotional traditions

=== Sport ===
- Sanjay Bangar: former Indian international cricketer and batting coach of the Indian national team.

=== Politics ===
- Jitendra Awhad: leader of the Nationalist Congress Party (NCP) and former cabinet minister in the Maharashtra government.
- Santosh Bangar: politician from Shiv Sena (Shinde faction), Member of the Maharashtra Legislative Assembly.
- Mohan Fad: political representative.
- Bhagwat Karad: Union Minister of State for Finance, Government of India (BJP).
- Manoj Kayande : social and political leader Sindkhed Raja Assembly constituency.
- Dhananjay Munde: politician from Maharashtra, member of the Nationalist Congress Party (NCP), and state cabinet minister.
- Gopinath Munde: senior Bharatiya Janata Party (BJP) leader from Maharashtra, former Deputy Chief Minister of Maharashtra and Union Minister for Rural Development.
- Pankaja Munde: politician from Maharashtra, member of the Bharatiya Janata Party (BJP), and former cabinet minister.
- Pritam Munde: Member of Parliament Bharatiya Janata Party (BJP) from Beed, Maharashtra.
- Balasaheb Mahadu Sanap: politician from Maharashtra.
