= Kashyap (surname) =

Kashyap is an Indian surname based on the Kashyap caste. Notable people with the surname include:

== Rajput ==
- Anurag Kashyap, film director
- Abhinav Kashyap, film writer and director of Dabanggg (2010) and Besharam (2013). Real brother of Anurag Kashyap

== Bhumihar ==
- Anjana Om Kashyap, TV Journalist

== Koli ==
- Balak Ram Kashyap - Former MP and MLA from Shimla Lok Sabha constituency and Kasumpti Vidhan Sabha constituency respectively
- Suresh Kumar Kashyap - President of Himachal Pradesh State Unit of Bharatiya Janata Party and Ex MP from Shimla Lok Sabha constituency
- Virender Kashyap - Former MP from Shimla Lok Sabha constituency
- Roop Das Kashyap - Former MP from Shimla Lok Sabha constituency
- Reena Kashyap - Incumbent MLA from Pachhad Vidhan Sabha constituency

== Adivasi ==
- Baliram Kashyap MP from Bastar
- Dinesh Kashyap MP from Bastar Ex MLA from Jagdalpur Assembly constituency. Son of Baliram Kashyap MP

== Dhiwar ==
- Vijay Kumar Kashyap - Formar Minister of Uttar Pradesh and MLA Muzaffarnagar.
- Dharmendra Kashyap MP from Aonla
- Narendra Kumar Kashyap MLC, Minister of State (Independent Charge) Uttar Pradesh
- Ram Kumar Kashyap MLA from Indri Hariyana & Ex MP Rajya Sabha.
- Sapna Kashyap - Indian Politician BJP Leader and Member of State Women Commission of Uttar Pradesh.
- Nikesh Jeewna - Nikesh Kashyap an Indian Singer, Writer and Ex-Captain of Meerut Football Team.

== Others ==
- Ajay Kashyap Bollywood film director. His directorial debut was Jaan Ki Baazi (1985).
- Anil Kashyap
- Anurag Kashyap (contestant)
- Bimla Kashyap Sood
- Bharti Kashyap
- Dinesh Kashyap
- D.D. Kashyap
- Subhash C. Kashyap
- Tulsiram Sharma Kashyap
- Kumar Kashyap Mahasthavir
- Vasundhara Kashyap
- Santosh Kashyap
- Sunil Kashyap
- Shibani Kashyap
- Vijay Kashyap
- Ramadhar Kashyap
- Vijay Kumar Kashyap
- Shiv Ram Kashyap
- Rameshwar Singh Kashyap
- Jagdish Kashyap
- Shaiza Kashyap
- Suraj Kashyap
- Praveen Kashyap
- Parupalli Kashyap
- Sagar Kashyap
- Kedar Nath Kashyap
- Rajpal Kashyap
- Suresh Kashyap

== See also ==
- Kashyapa
