= Kassapa =

Kassapa, Kashyapa, or Kasyapa may refer to:

- Kassapa Buddha, also known as Kāśyapa Buddha, an ancient Buddha
- Kashyapa I of Anuradhapura (r. 473–495), king of Sri Lanka
- Kashyapa or Kāśyapa, a Vedic Hindu sage
  - Kashyapa Samhita, Ayurveda treatise attributed to him
- Kashyap (caste), a caste in India
- Kashyap (surname), an Indian surname

== See also ==
- Kashyap Colony village in Uttar Pradesh, India
- Mahākāśyapa or Mahakassapa, disciple of Śakyamuni Buddha
- Kāśyapīya, a school of Indian Buddhism, name after a Buddhist missionary of Ashoka from India
