= Khairekan =

Khaireka
- Village
- Location within Haryana Location within India
- Coordinates: 29.597853°N 75.014512°E
- Country: India
- State: Haryana
- District: Sirsa
- Tehsils: Sirsa

Government
  - Body: Gram Panchayat, Khairekan
  - Sarpanch: Nishant josan

Population (2011)
  - Total: 4,500

Languages
  - Official: English, Hindi
  - Regional: Bagri
- Time zone: UTC+5:30 (IST)
- PIN: 125077
- Telephone code: 91-01666
- Vehicle registration: HR
- Nearest city: Sirsa, New Delhi, Chandigarh
- Sex ratio: 900

Khairekan is a village 7 km away from Sirsa district of Haryana. This village is situated on NH 9 Dabwali road Sirsa. The pin code of this village is 125077. Castes there are Arora, Bishnoi,Jaat, Shakya, Sharma, Kamboj, Kumhar, Suthar, Meghwal, Rajput, Kashyap, Bawri, Bajigar, Valmiki and Jogi's. This village people knows Punjabi, Bagri and Hindi languages More than 5000 peoples are there. There is a small postoffice in Khairekan. There is own Power house and Water works in Khairekan. Most of the villagers are lived on agriculture. In this village there are facilities such as society bank, Veterinary Hospital, Harijan Chaupal, Aanganwadi, Cricket, Handball playground and Gym. The players of Handball of this village played at national level.

There are two Government schools one is co-ed and the other is for girls at the primary level. Named first as Govt. High school, Khairekan and the second one as Govt. Girls' school Khairekan. There is a private school named R.P. Sen.Sec. School. Small type of industries are also developed there because of short distance to the city sirsa.

Khairekan is situated on the bank of the Ghaggar river, so most of the nearby agricultural land is cultivated in the fear of the flood. There is also benefit of Ghaggar river in dripping nearby lands of this village through pipelines. Most of the area of Khairekan looks greenery. There is a new bank open "HARYANA GRAMIN BANK" Sponsor by Punjab National Bank at 27 Sep 2013.Most of the agriculture land is irrigated by water of ghaggar river by pipelines.
