= List of Odia films of 1960 =

This is a list of the films produced by the Ollywood film industry based in Cuttack in 1960:

== A-Z ==
Title	Director	Cast	Genre	Notes
1960
ଶ୍ରୀ ଲୋକନାଥ; Sri Lokanath	Prafulla Sengupta	Babi, Indrajit Ghosh, Akhyaya Mohanty Kasyapa	Fantasy	First Oriya film which got National Film Award
