= Kashyap =

Kashyap may refer to:

- Kashyap (caste), a caste in India, also referred to as Koshyal or Kanshilya
- Kashyap, a clan of Brahmins from the Kashyap (caste)
- Kashyap, a clan of palaquin bearers from the Kahar
- Kashyap (surname), a surname from India; and list of people by the surname
- Kashyapa or Kashyap, a Saptarishi, an ancient Vedic sage from the Rg Veda
- Kashyap Bandhu (1899–1985), Kashmiri politician
- Kashyap Patel (born 1980), U.S. politician and director of the FBI
- Kashyap Prajapati (born 1995), Omani cricket player

== See also ==
- Kashyap Colony, Meerut district, Meerut division, Uttar Pradesh, India
- VCARB (Visa CashApp Racing Bulls), an F1 team
- CashApp, a U.S. digital wallet from Block Inc.
