= Pandyan invasion of Anuradhapura =

- Part of Pandyan–Sinhalese wars
Date	c. 846 CE
Location	Anuradhapura, Sri Lanka
Result	Pandyan victory: Anuradhapura Sacked by the Pandya forces

Belligerents
Pandya Kingdom	Anuradhapura Kingdom

Commanders and leaders
Srimara Srivallabha	Sena I Mahinda ‡‡ Kassapa ‡‡

Strength
Unknown	Unknown

Casualties and losses
Unknown	Heavy

The Pandyan invasion of Anuradhapura was a military campaign launched by the Pandya king Srimara Srivallabha against the Anuradhapura kingdom during the reign of Sena I in the mid-9th century CE, generally dated to around 846 CE. The invasion is recorded in the Sri Lankan chronicle Mahavamsa (Culavamsa section) and is corroborated by Pandyan inscriptions such as the Sinnamanur copper plates. The campaign resulted in a decisive Pandyan victory, the sack of Anuradhapura, and a subsequent treaty restoring Sena I to the throne.

== Background ==
The invasion of Anuradhapura was carried out by the Pandya king Srimara Srivallabha during the reign of Sena I (r. 846–866 CE). Pandyan inscriptions, including the Sinnamanur copper plates, refer to victories over the Sinhala country. These claims are supported by the Sri Lankan chronicle Mahavamsa (Culavamsa section), which records a major Pandyan expedition into the island.

== Invasion ==
According to the Mahavamsa, a large Pandyan force invaded Sri Lanka and advanced through the northern regions, causing widespread devastation. The Sinhalese army confronted the invaders but was defeated in a major engagement. King Sena I, unable to withstand the invasion, fled from the capital to the mountainous Malaya region. Members of the royal family attempted to resist the advancing forces but were ultimately unsuccessful.

== Battle of Mahatalita ==
The decisive battle of the campaign took place at Mahatalita (also rendered Mahattalita). In this engagement: The Pandyan army achieved a decisive victory over the Sinhalese forces The defending army was routed, leading to the collapse of organized resistance Prince Mahinda is said to have died during the conflict, while Prince Kassapa fled after attempting to oppose the invaders This defeat allowed the Pandyan forces to advance toward the capital without significant opposition.

== Aftermath ==
Following their victory, the Pandyan army captured Anuradhapura and sacked the city. The Mahavamsa describes extensive plundering, including the seizure of wealth from royal and religious establishments such as monasteries and stupas. After devastating the region, the Pandyan king entered into a treaty with Sena I and restored him to the throne. The Pandyan forces subsequently withdrew from the island. Although his rule was reinstated, Sena I is described in the chronicle as having been deeply affected by the destruction caused during the invasion.Sena was eventually forced to make terms with the Pandyas (and the Tamil forces were withdrawn from Sri Lanka)
