= Kasumpati =

Kasumpti
- Neighbourhood
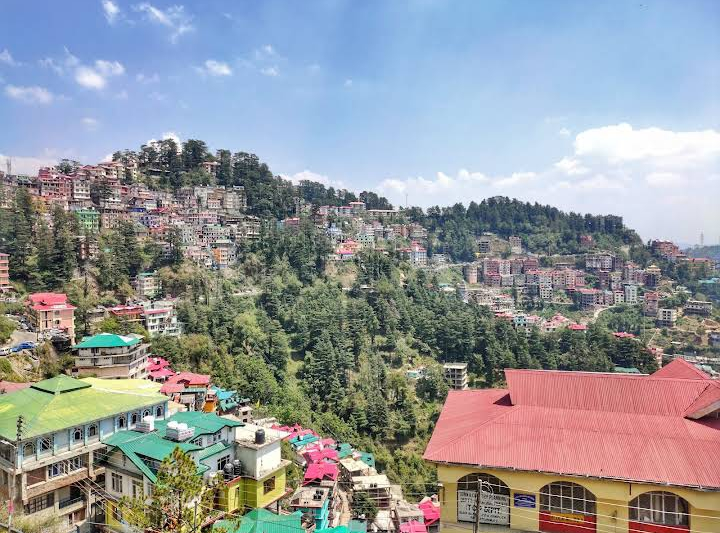
- Kasumpati locality
- Location of Kasumpti in Shimla
- Coordinates: 31.07°N 77.18°E
- Country: India
- State: Himachal Pradesh
- District: Shimla

Government
  - MLA: Anirudh Singh
- Elevation: 1,350 m (4,430 ft)

Population (2011)
  - Total: 21,345

Languages
  - Official: Hindi
  - Native: Mahasui (Keonthali)
- Time zone: UTC+5:30 (IST)
- PIN: 171009

Kasumpati, also called Kasumpti, is a part in Shimla District in the North Indian state of Himachal Pradesh.

== Geography ==
Kasumpati (Kasumpti) is at an elevation of 1,883 metres (6,178 ft).

== Climate ==
Kasumpati has a cool and moderate climate. Between December and March, the village gets heavy snow and the temperature can hover around freezing point. During the summer, the climate is warmer with temperatures around thirty degrees Celsius.

== Politics ==
Map of Kasumpati Constituency in Shimla district

Anirudh Singh (born 27 January 1977) is the present Member of Legislative Assembly (MLA) from Kasumpti, Shimla, Himachal Pradesh since 2012 to 2017.

- Temp in Winter:−10 °C (14 °F) to 18 °C (64 °F)
- Temp in Summer:20 °C (68 °F) to 32 °C (90 °F)

Kasumpati

Climate chart (precipitation, max. and min. temperature)
J	F	M	A	M	J	J	A	S	O	N	D
55 7 −10	47 9 −2	59 16 7	41 20 11	56 32 15	176 32 17	377 30 15	335 22 15	190 24 13	46 20 11	14 16 7	16 5 −5
- █ Average max. and min. temperatures in °C
- █ Precipitation totals in mm
Imperial conversion
J	F	M	A	M	J	J	A	S	O	N	D
2.1 45 14	1.9 48 28	2.3 60 44	1.6 69 52	2.2 90 59	6.9 90 62	15 86 59	13 72 59	7.5 75 56	1.8 67 51	0.5 61 45	0.6 41 23
- █ Average max. and min. temperatures in °F
- █ Precipitation totals in inches
