= Balak Ram Kashyap =

Indian politician

Sir Balak Ram Kashyap
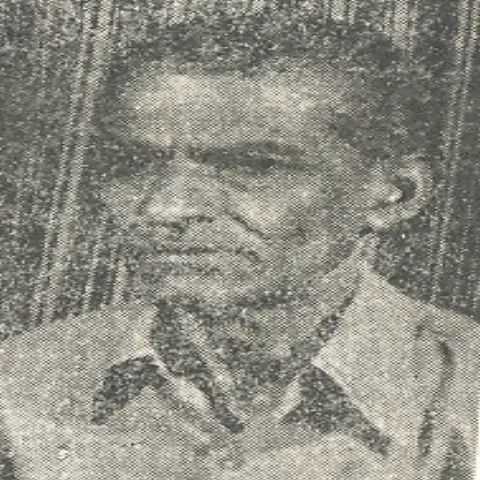
- Balak Ram Kashyap in 1977 during elections

Member of Parliament, Lok Sabha
- In office 24 March 1977 – 14 January 1980
- President: Neelam Sanjiva Reddy
- Prime Minister: Morarji Desai
- Vice President: B. D. Jatti
- Preceded by: Pratap Singh Kashyap
- Succeeded by: Krishan Dutt Sultanpuri
- Constituency: Shimla

Member of the Himachal Pradesh Legislative Assembly

Assembly Member for Kasumpti
- In office 19 May 1982 – 15 May 1985
- Preceded by: Roop Dass Kashyap
- Succeeded by: Shonkia Ram Kashyap

Personal details
- Born: Balak Ram Kashyap; 8 March 1918; 108 years ago Kashyap Niwas, Kaithu, Annadale, Shimla, Shimla district, Punjab Province, British India (now Himachal Pradesh), India
- Died: 18 February 2003 (aged 84) IGMC, Shimla, Himachal Pradesh, India
- Citizenship: India
- Party: Janata Party
- Spouse: Janki Devi (married: 1946)
- Children: 4 sons, 5 daughters
- Parent: Kesroo Ram Kashyap (father)
- Occupation: Army person; Politician

Military service
- Allegiance: British India (1941–1947); India (1947–1976)
- Branch/service: British Indian Army (1941–1947); Indian Army (1947–1976)
- Years of service: 6 years in British Indian Army; 29 years in Indian Army
- Rank: Civilian Staff Officer (1st Class)
- Commands: Integrated Defence Headquarters, Ministry of Defence, New Delhi

Balak Ram Kashyap (8 March 1918 – 18 February 2003) was an Indian politician, social worker, former Member of Parliament from Shimla Lok Sabha constituency and former Member of Legislative Assembly from Kasumpti Vidhan Sabha Constituency as a member of Janata Party and was an army official in the British Indian Army and retired Civilian Staff Officer (Class I) from Indian Army.

== Early life ==
Balak Ram Kashyap was born in a Agriculturist Koli family to Kesroo Ram Kashyap on 8 March 1918 while India was colony of British Raj. He was born in Kashyap Niwas at Annadale locality in Shimla city. They were four brothers and two sisters, he was eldest of all. At the age of 23 he got recruited in Civilian Staff in Indian Army in 1941 and he served in Army Headquarters in New Delhi for 35 years.

== Political career ==
He got elected in 1977 Lok Sabha Elections. He was one of the first and major leaders in the initial making of Janta Party which has now become the mainstream Indian political party i.e. Bhartiya Janata Party. He has worked for the party with senior leaders like Jayprakash Narayan and L.K. Advani.

- 1977 - 1980: Member of Parliament from Shimla Lok Sabha constituency
- 1982 - 1985: Member of Himachal Pradesh Legislative Assembly from Kasumpti Assembly Constituency
