= Pratap Singh (Shimla) =

Indian politician (1912–1975)

Pratap Shivram Singh Member of Parliament, Indian National Congress
- प्रताप शिवराम सिंह
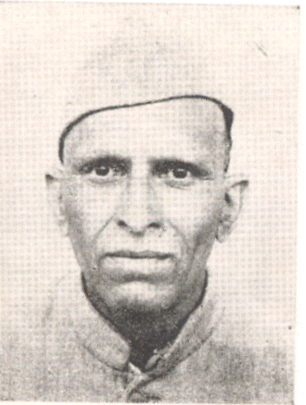
- Sri Pratap Shivram Singh
- Born: Pratap Singh; 27 December 1912; Nahan, Sirmur State, British India
- Died: 24 January 1975 (aged 62); Port Blair, India
- Citizenship: India
- Occupation: Agriculturist
- Organization: Akhil Bhartiya Kshatriya Koli Mahasabha
- Predecessor: Virbhadra Singh
- Successor: Balak Ram Kashyap
- Political party: Indian National Congress
- Spouse: Smt. Sarojni Singh
- Father: Shivram Singh
- Awards: Awarded by five Army medals

Pratap Shivram Singh (27 December 1912 – 24 January 1975) was an Indian politician, social worker and British Indian Army soldier as Junior commissioned officer. He was elected as Member of Parliament of Third, Fourth loksabha and 5th Lok Sabha from Shimla constituency. Shimla Lok Sabha was formerly known as Sirmur lok sabha and reserved for Scheduled castes. He was also president of Koli Mahasabha.

Singh died in Port Blair on 24 January 1975, at the age of 62.

== Early life ==
Pratap Shivram Singh was born to a agriculturist Koli Shivram Singh on 27 December 1912 in Nahan town of Sirmur State during British rule in India. He joined British Indian Army in 1932 and retired as Junior commissioned officer in 1950 and was awarded by five Army medals.

== Other minor posts ==
=== As president ===
- 1932–1952, Akhil Bhartiya Kshatriya Koli Mahasabha
- 1964, Paonta Labour Union, District Sirmur

=== As secretary ===
- 1950, Ex-Soldiers Association, District Sirmur
- 1952–1962, Ajeet Cooperative M.P. Society Ltd

=== As member ===
- 1957–1962, Territorial Council, Himachal Pradesh

== International travels ==
Pratap Shivram Singh traveled to Pakistan and Burma.
