= Pune Tribal Museum =

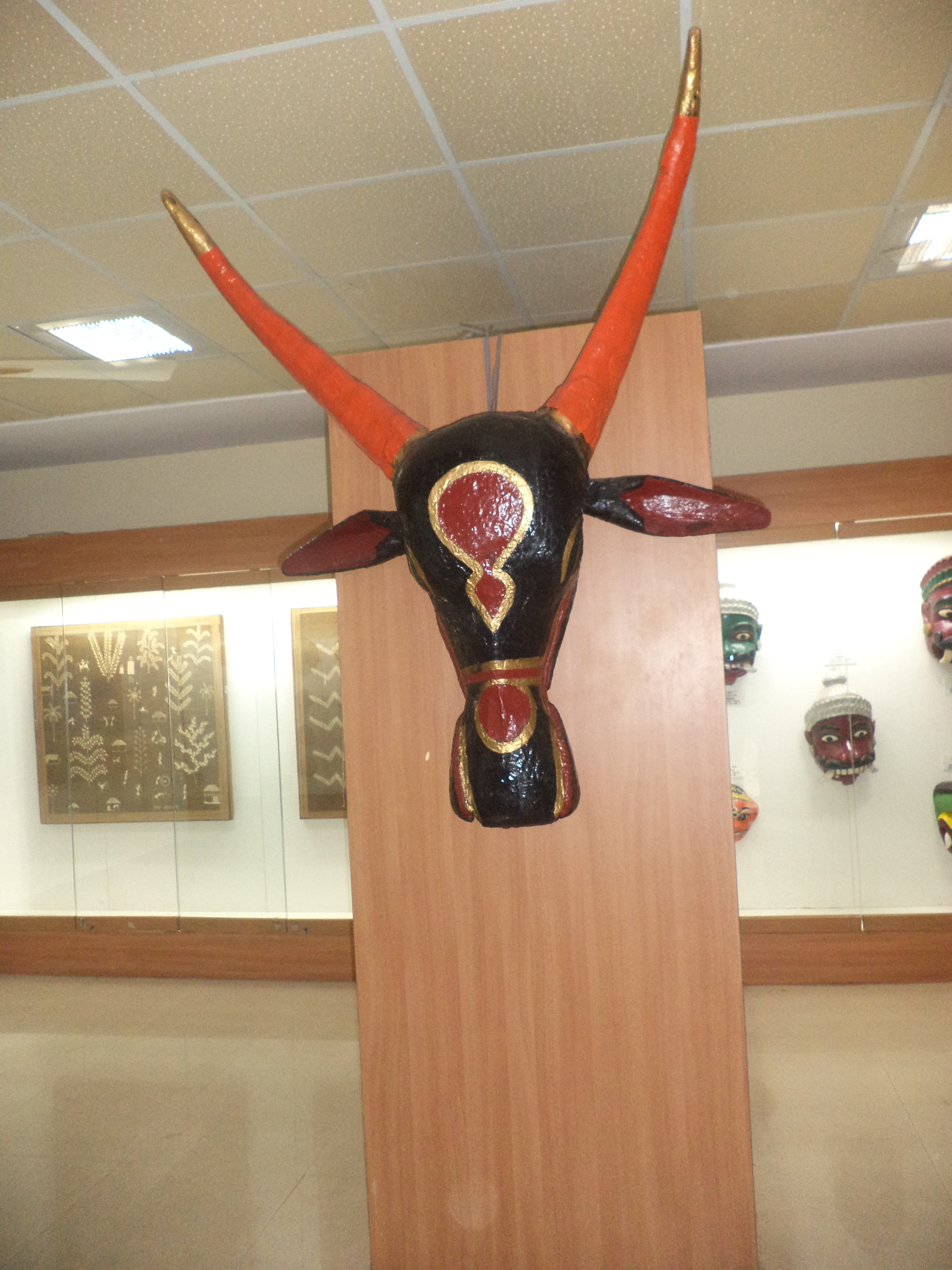
- Established: 1962
- Location: Pune, Maharashtra
- Coordinates: 18.52977708°N 73.88600422°E
- Type: Tribal Museum

Pune Tribal Museum is located in the city of Pune, Maharashtra, India. The Museum was established in the year 1962 as an extension of Tribal Research and Training Institute, Pune, started display in year 1965 and exhibits the culture of the Maharashtrian tribes. This tribal museum was found as a place 'committed to preserve, the artistic and poetic impulses of tribals'. The administration of the museum is currently with Tribal Research and Training Institute, Pune.

== Exhibits ==
It showcases the artifacts including musical instruments, jewelry, tools, handicrafts, costumes, idol, household articles, photographs, weapons, tools, warli paintings, bamboo works, masks, clothes, utensils among others related to 47 tribes of Maharashtra.

== Expansion plans ==
There are plans to enable passengers waiting at Pune airport to have a virtual tour of this museum at the Tribal Research and Training Institute, Pune's display centre set in the same airport.
