= Suresh Kashyap =

Indian politician

Member (elect) of Uttar Pradesh Legislative Council
- In office 7 July 2016 – 6 July 2022
- Preceded by: Subodh Kumar, BSP

Personal details
- Party: BSP
- Occupation: Politician

Suresh Kashyap is a leader of the Bahujan Samaj Party in Uttar Pradesh. On 10 June 2016, he was elected to the Uttar Pradesh Legislative Council.
