= Tribal Research and Training Institute, Pune =

Research and training institute in Pune, India

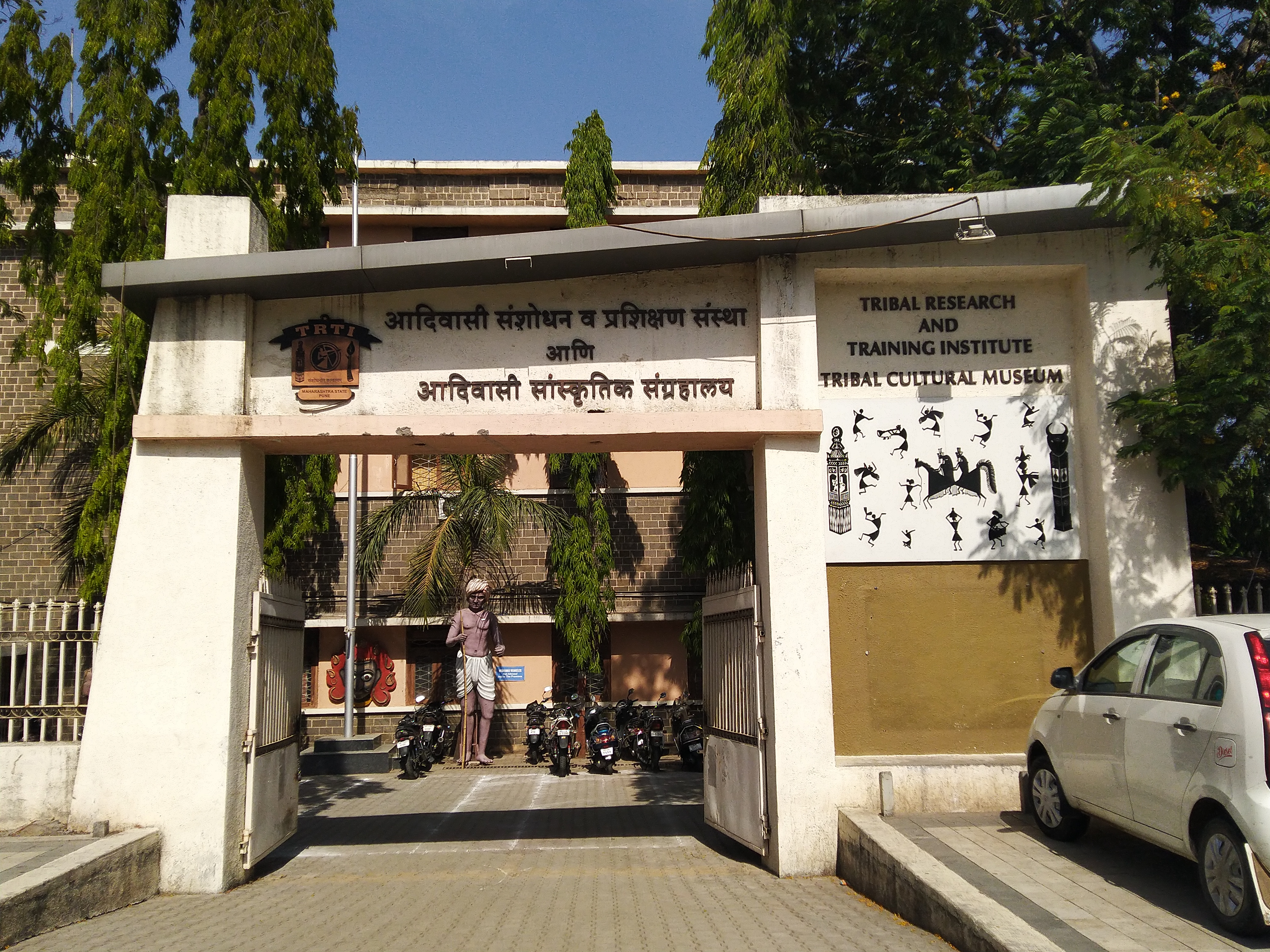
- Established: 1962; 63 years ago
- Owner: Government of Maharashtra
- Address: 28, Queen's Garden, Near VVIP Circuit House, Koregaon Park Road, Pune - 411001
- Location: Pune, Maharashtra, India
- Coordinates: 18.529714°N 73.885888°E
- Interactive map of Tribal Research and Training Institute, Pune
- Website: trti.maharashtra.gov.in/index.php/en/

Tribal Research and Training Institute is a research and training institute based in Pune, India. It is dedicated to conduct research on tribal issues as also to evaluate the impact of various schemes on the tribes residing in Maharashtra. The institute came into existence in 1962.

== Functions ==
The primary function of this institute is to conduct research on tribals' issues as also to do studies to gauge the various schemes' impact on Tribal life in the state. It further offers in-serve training courses as also coaching to the tribal aspirants vying for jobs through Maharashtra Public Service Commission's examination among others. It also runs Youth Leadership Training Programmes aimed at tribal groups.

== Facilities ==
Pune Tribal Museum is located in the building of this institute. The institute also has a library with books related to tribals.
