= Kasumpti Assembly constituency =

Legislative Assembly constituency in Himachal Pradesh State, India

Coordinates: 31.08°N 77.18°E

Kasumpti
- Constituency No. 62 for the Himachal Pradesh Legislative Assembly

Constituency details
- Country: India
- Region: North India
- State: Himachal Pradesh
- District: Shimla
- Lok Sabha constituency: Shimla
- Established: 1951
- Total electors: 67,017
- Reservation: None

Member of Legislative Assembly
- 14th Himachal Pradesh Legislative Assembly
- Incumbent Anirudh Singh
- Party: Indian National Congress
- Elected year: 2022

Kasumpti Assembly constituency is one of the 68 assembly constituencies of Himachal Pradesh a northern Indian state. Kasumpati is also part of Shimla Lok Sabha constituency.

== Members of Legislative Assembly ==
Year	Member	Party
1951	Hitendra Sen	Independent
Himachal Pradesh did not have a Legislative Assembly from 1956 to 1967.
1967	Sita Ramm	Indian National Congress
1972	Shonkia Ram Kashyap	Indian National Congress
1977	Roop Dass Kashyap	Independent
1982	Balak Ram Kashyap	Bharatiya Janata Party
1985	Shonkia Ram Kashyap	Indian National Congress
1990	Roop Dass Kashyap	Bharatiya Janata Party
1993	Charanjiv Lal Kashyap	Indian National Congress
1998	Roop Dass Kashyap	Bharatiya Janata Party
2003	Sohan Lal	Independent
2007	Sohan Lal	Indian National Congress
2012	Anirudh Singh	Indian National Congress
2017	Anirudh Singh	Indian National Congress
2022	Anirudh Singh	Indian National Congress

== Election results ==
=== Assembly Election 2022 ===
2022 Himachal Pradesh Legislative Assembly election: Kasumpti
Party	Candidate	Votes	%	±%
INC	Anirudh Singh	25,759	55.43%	▲2.31
BJP	Suresh Bhardwaj	17,104	36.81%	▲6.31
CPI(M)	Kuldip Singh Tanwar	2,670	5.75%	▼5.57
NOTA	Nota	335	0.72%	▼0.25
AAP	Dr. Rajesh Chanana	307	0.66%	New
BSP	Kameshwar	159	0.34%	New
Rashtriya Devbhumi Party	Ram Prakash	136	0.29%	New
Margin of victory		8,655	18.62%	▼4.00
Turnout		46,470	69.34%	▲1.47
Registered electors		67,017		▲9.54
INC hold		Swing	▲2.31	

=== Assembly Election 2017 ===
2017 Himachal Pradesh Legislative Assembly election: Kasumpti
Party	Candidate	Votes	%	±%
INC	Anirudh Singh	22,061	53.12%	▲6.43
BJP	Vijay Jyoti	12,664	30.50%	▲11.07
CPI(M)	Kuldip Singh Tanwar	4,698	11.31%	▼1.99
Independent	Madan Mohan	954	2.30%	New
NOTA	None of the Above	404	0.97%	New
Independent	Inder Singh	212	0.51%	New
Margin of victory		9,397	22.63%	▼4.64
Turnout		41,527	67.87%	▲7.39
Registered electors		61,183		▲2.08
INC hold		Swing	▲6.43	

=== Assembly Election 2012 ===
2012 Himachal Pradesh Legislative Assembly election: Kasumpti
Party	Candidate	Votes	%	±%
INC	Anirudh Singh	16,929	46.70%	▲3.52
BJP	Prem Singh	7,043	19.43%	▼10.01
Independent	Vijay Jyoti	6,466	17.84%	New
CPI(M)	Kuldip Singh Tanwar	4,823	13.30%	New
HLC	Khushi Ram Balanatah	513	1.42%	New
Independent	Dineshwar Dutt	231	0.64%	New
Margin of victory		9,886	27.27%	▲13.53
Turnout		36,252	60.48%	▲7.39
Registered electors		59,938		▼40.08
INC hold		Swing	▲3.52	

=== Assembly Election 2007 ===
2007 Himachal Pradesh Legislative Assembly election: Kasumpti
Party	Candidate	Votes	%	±%
INC	Sohan Lal	22,931	43.18%	▲22.47
BJP	Tarsem Bharti	15,632	29.44%	▲0.50
Independent	Roop Dass Kashyap	10,250	19.30%	New
BSP	Uttam Singh Kashyap	1,607	3.03%	New
Independent	Manoj Kumar	990	1.86%	New
LJP	Surinder Kumar	809	1.52%	New
Independent	Roop Ram Chauhan	649	1.22%	New
Margin of victory		7,299	13.74%	▲6.27
Turnout		53,106	53.09%	▼2.71
Registered electors		1,00,023		▲19.76
INC gain from Independent		Swing	▲6.76	

=== Assembly Election 2003 ===
2003 Himachal Pradesh Legislative Assembly election: Kasumpti
Party	Candidate	Votes	%	±%
Independent	Sohan Lal	16,972	36.42%	New
BJP	Roop Dass Kashyap	13,487	28.94%	▼21.60
INC	Chiranjiv Lal	9,652	20.71%	▼24.92
HVC	Tarsem Bharti	5,667	12.16%	▲8.32
Independent	Papinder Singh	303	0.65%	New
Independent	Chet Ram Kashyap	301	0.65%	New
Margin of victory		3,485	7.48%	▲2.57
Turnout		46,606	56.09%	▲2.10
Registered electors		83,523		▲15.06
Independent gain from BJP		Swing	▼14.12	

=== Assembly Election 1998 ===
1998 Himachal Pradesh Legislative Assembly election: Kasumpti
Party	Candidate	Votes	%	±%
BJP	Roop Dass Kashyap	19,700	50.54%	▲9.74
INC	Shonkia Ram Kashyap	17,786	45.63%	▼12.76
HVC	Tarsem Bharti	1,495	3.84%	New
Margin of victory		1,914	4.91%	▼12.68
Turnout		38,981	54.35%	▼5.56
Registered electors		72,588		▲21.39
BJP gain from INC		Swing		

=== Assembly Election 1993 ===
1993 Himachal Pradesh Legislative Assembly election: Kasumpti
Party	Candidate	Votes	%	±%
INC	Charanjiv Lal Kashyap	20,688	58.38%	▲32.31
BJP	Roop Dass Kashyap	14,455	40.79%	▼31.47
Independent	Chet Ram Kashyap	292	0.82%	New
Margin of victory		6,233	17.59%	▼28.60
Turnout		35,435	59.67%	▲2.71
Registered electors		59,799		▲17.65
INC gain from BJP		Swing		

=== Assembly Election 1990 ===
1990 Himachal Pradesh Legislative Assembly election: Kasumpti
Party	Candidate	Votes	%	±%
BJP	Roop Dass Kashyap	20,770	72.26%	▲31.87
INC	Shonkia Ram Kashyap	7,493	26.07%	▼32.56
Doordarshi Party	Bimla Rani	399	1.39%	New
Margin of victory		13,277	46.19%	▲27.95
Turnout		28,743	56.87%	▼2.54
Registered electors		50,828		▲37.56
BJP gain from INC		Swing		

=== Assembly Election 1985 ===
1985 Himachal Pradesh Legislative Assembly election: Kasumpti
Party	Candidate	Votes	%	±%
INC	Shonkia Ram Kashyap	12,801	58.63%	▲26.53
BJP	Balak Ram Kashyap	8,819	40.39%	▲2.27
Independent	Parma Nand	213	0.98%	New
Margin of victory		3,982	18.24%	▲12.21
Turnout		21,833	59.55%	▼5.64
Registered electors		36,949		▲6.11
INC gain from BJP		Swing		

=== Assembly Election 1982 ===
1982 Himachal Pradesh Legislative Assembly election: Kasumpti
Party	Candidate	Votes	%	±%
BJP	Balak Ram Kashyap	8,594	38.13%	New
INC	Roop Dass Kashyap	7,236	32.10%	▲3.81
Independent	Shonkia Ram Kashyap	6,578	29.18%	New
JP	Surinder Singh	132	0.59%	▼21.23
Margin of victory		1,358	6.02%	▼11.16
Turnout		22,540	65.54%	▲14.79
Registered electors		34,822		▲21.16
BJP gain from Independent		Swing	▼7.34	

=== Assembly Election 1977 ===
1977 Himachal Pradesh Legislative Assembly election: Kasumpti
Party	Candidate	Votes	%	±%
Independent	Roop Dass Kashyap	6,526	45.47%	New
INC	Shonkia Ram Kashyap	4,060	28.29%	▼50.14
JP	Surender Singh Banolta	3,131	21.82%	New
Independent	Jiwanu Ram	501	3.49%	New
Independent	Telu Ram Baidwan	134	0.93%	New
Margin of victory		2,466	17.18%	▼46.17
Turnout		14,352	50.55%	▲11.70
Registered electors		28,740		▲15.89
Independent gain from INC		Swing	▼32.96	

=== Assembly Election 1972 ===
1972 Himachal Pradesh Legislative Assembly election: Kasumpti
Party	Candidate	Votes	%	±%
INC	Shonkia Ram Kashyap	7,437	78.43%	▲43.42
ABJS	Phulma Devi	1,430	15.08%	New
Independent	Heru Ram	466	4.91%	New
INC(O)	Puran Chand	149	1.57%	New
Margin of victory		6,007	63.35%	▲62.49
Turnout		9,482	39.03%	▼7.35
Registered electors		24,800		▼13.40
INC hold		Swing	▲43.42	

=== Assembly Election 1967 ===
1967 Himachal Pradesh Legislative Assembly election: Kasumpti
Party	Candidate	Votes	%	±%
INC	S. Ram	4,571	35.02%	New
Independent	H. Singh	4,459	34.16%	New
Independent	B. Nand	4,024	30.83%	New
Margin of victory		112	0.86%	▼11.56
Turnout		13,054	48.20%	▲2.91
Registered electors		28,637		▲83.49
INC gain from Independent		Swing	▼4.58	

=== Assembly Election 1952 ===
1952 Himachal Pradesh Legislative Assembly election: Kasumpti
Party	Candidate	Votes	%	±%
Independent	Hitendra Sen	2,637	39.59%	New
Independent	Tara Singh	1,810	27.18%	New
Independent	Bhaskra Nand	1,184	17.78%	New
Independent	Amin Chand	418	6.28%	New
SCF	Nirma	369	5.54%	New
Socialist	Bharat Singh	136	2.04%	New
Independent	Hira Nand	106	1.59%	New
Margin of victory		827	12.42%	
Turnout		6,660	42.67%	
Registered electors		15,607		
Independent win (new seat)				

== See also ==
- List of constituencies of the Himachal Pradesh Legislative Assembly
- Shimla district
- Kasumpati
