= Namdev Shastri Sanap =

Indian preacher

Namdev Shastri Sanap is a preacher and kirtankar of the traditional Varkari sect and received his initial education at the Warkari Shikshan Sanstha in Alandi. After that, he studied the most difficult part of Sanskrit literature, Jurisprudence, under the guidance of Shri Guru Shri 1008 Swami Kashikanandgiriji Maharaj Dwadashdarshanacharya Anandavan Ashram Kandivali Mumbai Gurukul system for 9 years and obtained the 'Judicial' degree from Varanasi Vidyapeeth. He also did his MA (Marathi) from Pune University and obtained his PhD from Marathwada University on the subject of 'The Creation of Warkari Saints'. After the death of Bhim Singh Maharaj, he took over the responsibility of Bhagwangad as the successor to the throne of Bhagwangad and continues to study and teach Dnyaneshwari and Sanskrit. These speakers are both traditional and modern in their studies. "Their Kirtan and sermons" are very useful for Dnyaneshwari practitioners and are a solution to mental problems. Continuing the legacy of Bhagwan Baba , he has greatly developed the temple there. He has built large monasteries of Bhagwan Gad in Alandi, Pandharpur, Paithan and Aurangabad. Also, a grand temple of Shri Sant Dnyaneshwar Maharaj is being built at Bhagwan Gad and the work of propagating and spreading the Warkari sect is underway by establishing Dnyaneshwari University in 2004, which provides Warkari education.

== Guru tradition ==
According to the Bhagwangad, the lineage of Bhagwan Baba is as follows: Narayan Brahmadev Atri Dattatreya Janardanswami Sant Eknath Gavoba or Nityanand Anant Dayanand Swami Paithankar Anand Rishi Nagadnarayan Maharaj Mahadev Maharaj (first) Shetibaba (Dadasaheb Maharaj) Govind Maharaj Narsuu Maharaj Mahadev Maharaj (second) Manikbaba Sant Bhagwan Baba Bhimsingh Baba Namdev Shastri Baba

Efforts are underway to build a 60-foot-high main gate, a hall, a grand library that can hold more than two lakh books, an air-conditioned guest house at the foot of the fort, a garden, a jogging track, a meditation center, a grand museum of items used by Bhagwan Baba , a residential English school, a helipad facility on the 16-acre land of the temple at the foot of the fort, etc. for the development of the fort. At present, the work of the main gate is in progress. There are solar lights here and electricity is generated from wind energy. Science seems to be combined with spirituality at Bhagwangad. Efforts are underway to include Shrikshetra Bhagwangad in the pilgrimage development plan, and to get the forest department land near Bhagwangad for the development of the fort. Namdev Maharaj Shastri Sanap has done a lot of development work after taking charge of the development of the fort. Kitchen, Mahaprasad House, Parayan Hall, Kirtan Hall, Sant Vidyapeeth, Kirtan-Pravachan-Taal-Mridung training classes etc. Efforts are underway to construct internal roads

Development works worth Rs 25 crore have been completed at Shri Kshetra Bhagwangad. The Sansthan had decided to expand Bhagwangad, which is a symbol of religious harmony, across the state. Accordingly, branches of the fort were initially started in Alandi and Pandharpur. In the second phase, the Dnyaneshwari Adhyasan Kendra is starting in Aurangabad from Monday. In the third phase, a branch is being established in Paithan, and the work there is in progress.

== See also ==
- Sant Bhagwan Baba
