= Anirudh Singh (politician) =

Indian politician from Himachal Pradesh

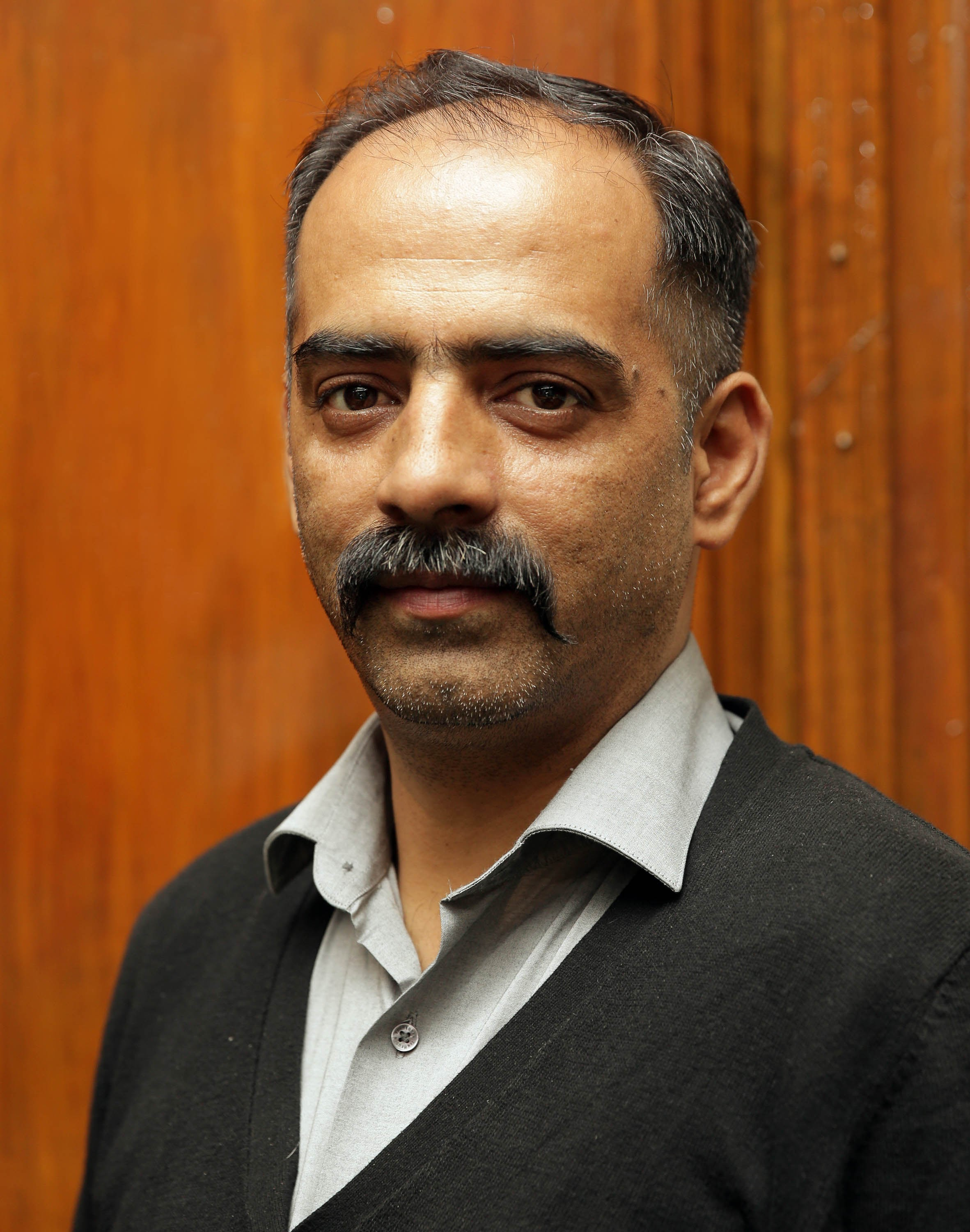

Cabinet Minister, Government of Himachal Pradesh
- Incumbent
- Assumed office 8 January 2023
- Governor: Rajendra Arlekar (2022–2023); Shiv Pratap Shukla (2023–2026); Kavinder Gupta (2026–present)
- Cabinet: Sukhu ministry
- Chief Minister: Sukhvinder Singh Sukhu
- Ministry and Departments: Rural Development; Panchayati Raj

Member of the Himachal Pradesh Legislative Assembly
- Incumbent
- Assumed office 20 December 2012
- Preceded by: Sohan Lal
- Constituency: Kasumpti

Personal details
- Born: 27 January 1977 (age 49) Shimla, Himachal Pradesh, India
- Party: Indian National Congress
- Spouse: Chetna Singh
- Children: 2 (One son & One daughter)
- Parent: Trivikram Singh (father)
- Education: St. Edward's School, Shimla

Anirudh Singh (born 27 January 1977) is the present Member of Legislative Assembly (MLA) from Kasumpti, Shimla, Himachal Pradesh since 2012. He is also serving as Cabinet Minister of the Government of Himachal Pradesh since January 2023.

== Early life and family ==
Born on 27 January 1977 in Shimla, Anirudh Singh is the son of Late Shri Trivikram Singh. He is a graduate and received his education at St. Edward's School in Shimla. Anirudh is married to Smt. Chetna Singh, and the couple is blessed with one son and one daughter. He is actively involved in agriculture, business, and is known for his contributions as a political and social worker.

== Political journey ==
Anirudh Singh has been an active member of the Congress Party since 1998. His political journey includes various leadership roles such as Vice-President of the Youth Congress in Shimla City (2003-2005), Vice-President of the State Youth Congress, State General Secretary of the Indian Youth Congress, Vice-President of the State and Shimla Lok Sabha Constituency PYC, and National Coordinator for the IYC.

He has also served as a Member of the Zila Parishad in Chamyana Ward No-22, Distt. Shimla, twice in 2005 and 2010. Anirudh held the position of Chairman of Zila Parishad, Shimla, from 27 January 2011 to January 2013. In 2021, he became the Secretary of AICC and Co-Incharge of AICC, Assam Congress Committee.

== Legislative career ==
Anirudh Singh was first elected to the State Legislative Assembly in December 2012 and was re-elected in December 2017. During his terms, he served on various committees, including Public Undertakings, Subordinate Legislation, Rules, Public Accounts, and Estimates Committees.

Elected for the third consecutive term in December 2022, Anirudh Singh was inducted into the Council of Ministers as the Rural Development & Panchayati Raj Minister on 8 January 2023.

== Controversy ==
Anirudh Singh was accused of assaulting Achal Jindal, Manager (Technical) and Yogesh, Site Engineer of National Highways Authority of India (NHAI) Shimla on 30 June 2025. They both were assaulted in presence of Manjeet Sharma, SDM Shimla Rural near Bhattakufer. The Central Engineering Service (Roads) Officers' Association and NHAI Engineer's Association also condemned this incident.
