= Sagar Kashyap =

Indian tennis player

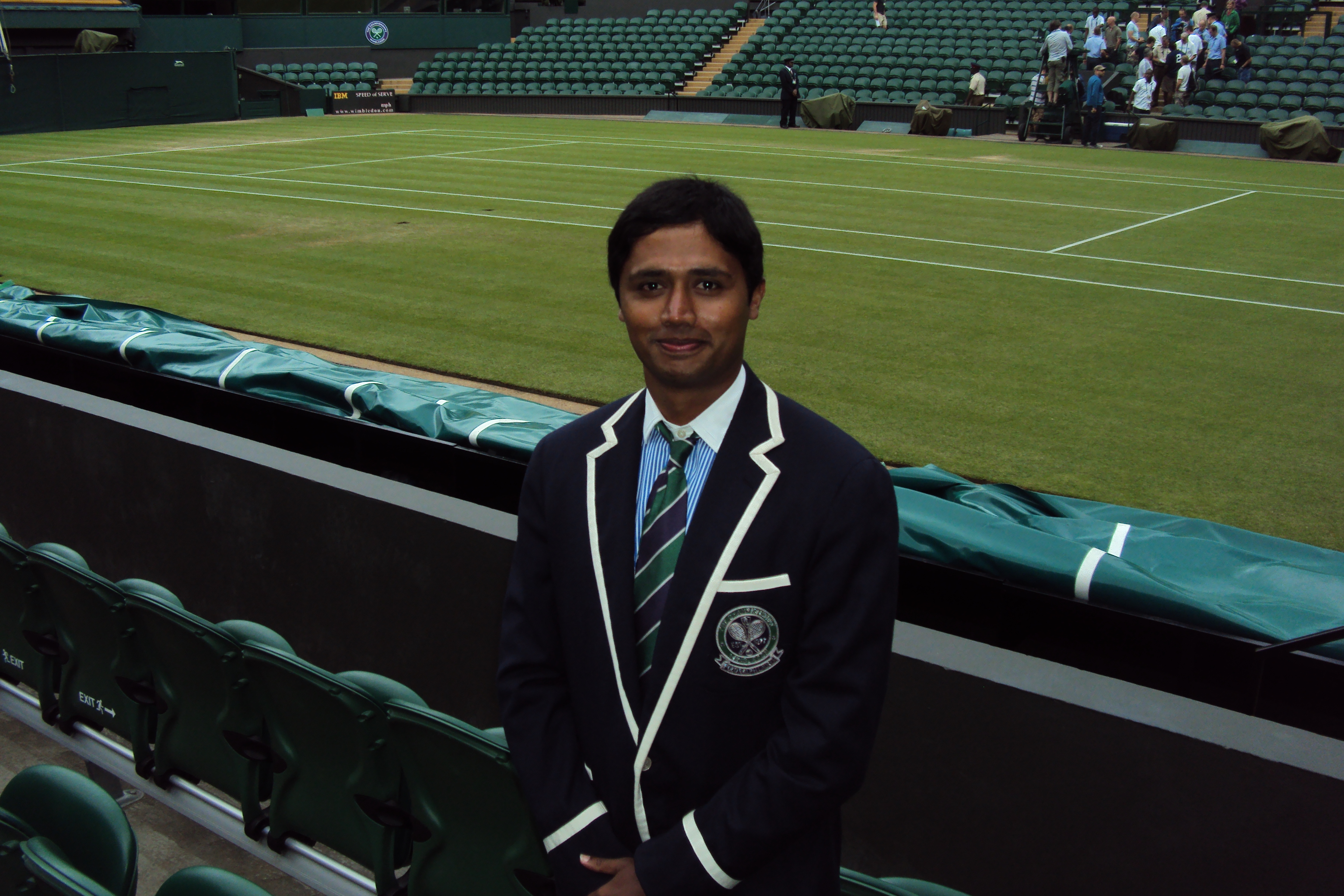
- Sagar at Wimbledon Center court
- Occupation: Tennis player

Sagar Kashyap is a former junior tennis player from Mysore, Karnataka, India, and the youngest Indian to officiate at the Wimbledon Championships.

== Biography ==
Born in Mysore, Kashyap started playing tennis aged 12. He is a former under-18 junior ITF player and has played at various national and international tournaments.

He studied computer engineering at Vidya Vikas Engineering college in Mysore started off as a line umpire in 2005 for Fed cup in New Delhi and had also participated as a line umpire in ITF events in Bangalore. Kashyap then rose to the rank of a supervisor and was a level 1 chair umpire in ITF events which entitled him to officiate up to second round. Sagar attended a workshop in Mumbai and became a white badge umpire. In an interview to a news paper Sagar stated "I was a national level player but turned towards umpiring. I cleared an ITF exam after which I became an International White Badge official. And now, I got a chance to travel to London and officiate in the qualifiers which is a huge boost to my career,". He became the youngest Indian to officiate in Wimbledon Championship in 2011
