= Roop Dass Kashyap =

Indian politician

Roop Dass Kashyap is an Indian politician and member of the Bharatiya Janata Party. Kashyap was a member of the Himachal Pradesh Legislative Assembly from the Kasumpti constituency in Shimla district.
