= Kashyap Colony =

Kashyap Colony Reda Basti
- Village
- Interactive map of Kashyap Colony
- Country: India
- State: Uttar Pradesh
- Division: Meerut
- District: Meerut
- First settled: 1952
- Incorporated (urban village): 1987

Population (2015)
  - Total: 2,000

Kashyap Colony (formerly known as Reda Basti) is an urban village in Meerut district, Meerut division, Uttar Pradesh. Only 10 kilometers from the city of Meerut, the village was settled in 1952 and incorporated in 1987. The village received national attention in Fall 2015, when it was added to the electric grid after 63 years of existing without power.

== History ==
In 1952, some residents of Kanshi, a village two kilometers away, founded the settlement, hoping for better life. Named Reda Basti, in the early years, the only structures were "kuchcha" houses and straw huts. However, according to village elder Kirachant Kashyap, by the 1980s, it was "a proper settlement with pucca houses." This led to the 1982 renaming of the village as Kashyap Colony. With more permanent structures came attention from the Meerut Nagar Nigam, or Municipal Corporation, who deemed the settlement illegal and took the villagers to court. The village won, and received incorporation as an urban village in 1987.

While Kashyap Colony was now legally recognized, it still lacked basic necessities. Electricity was never added, despite its legal and incorporated status. Residents were forced to use a kerosene-powered generator to pump water from the village's only tube well. Schoolchildren were unable to study after dark, and a school was never able to be built, causing high dropout rates.

On 5 July 2015, an article by The Times of India reported that a local NGO working with the village and municipal government to solve the issue. P.K. Nigam, an engineer associated with the project, said:

"I am aware of the problems faced by the residents of Kashyap Colony. Last month, there was a meeting between Meerut MP Rajendra Agarwal, DM Pankaj Yadav and PVVNL officials. Kashyap Colony will be made a part of the Integrated Power Development Scheme (IPDS), which is for urban areas."

When asked when the village was likely to get power, he stated, "The scheme is not ready yet but it will happen soon." Three months later, electric poles were installed in Kashyap Colony. Pankaj Sharma, representing Meerut Nagrik Adhikar Manch (MNAM), the local NGO that had been supporting the village in its effort, said:

"For years, the villagers had approached various authorities and made rounds to the corridors of power. But all they got were empty promises. Whomever the villagers approached said they would ensure that the village got electricity, but nobody gave them a timeline. When we met the villagers, we advised them to launch an organized protest, and only after that the authorities woke up and promised the villagers that they would get electricity supply by Diwali. But, villagers, who had earlier got only empty promises, would not be satisfied till they actually saw something concrete. On Monday, electric poles were finally erected in the area, bringing the hope to the villagers that they won't have to celebrate Diwali in the dark this year."

V. V. Panth, managing director of Paschimanchal Vidyut Vitaran Nigam Limited (PVVNL), the engineering company in charge of the project, said:

"The work was initially thrown off schedule for a while, but now we are back on track. The poles that were given to us earlier were of substandard quality. We rejected those poles. After about a week's delay, the work is back on track. Poles have been erected and it will take about a month to complete the work. We are not too far behind the schedule. A lot depends on the commitment of the contractor, and we are constantly supervising the work."

Ultimately, the village was first lit up on the eve of Diwali, the Hindu festival of lights. In mid-November 2015, the first residents, around 30 families, applied for power connections to their homes.

Following Kashyap Colony's addition to the electrical grid, residents began calling for construction of a primary school in the village. The same NGO that helped them receive power announced it was working with the village on this project, as well as an effort to have the village's roads paved.

The state of Uttar Pradesh in India.

== Geography ==
The settlement is located 10 kilometers north of Meerut, and only two kilometers away from Kanshi.

== Demographics ==
The Meerut district of Uttar Pradesh in which Kashyap Colony is located.

Kashyap Colony has a population of 2,000.

=== Religion ===
There is a significant Muslim population in the village. During the 63 years without electricity, they were unable to fast due to heat.

== Government ==
Kashyap Colony is classified as an urban village by the Meerut Municipal Corporation since 1987. The village government consists of a council of elders.

== Economy ==
Most villagers work as masons or farmers.

== Education ==
Kashyap Colony has no schools, and children from the village have to travel to either Kanshi, a village two kilometers away, or Partapur, a town around five kilometers away. Not all children are able to attend primary school because of this distance, and most end up dropping out as they grow older.

Shortly after the installation of electricity in the village, residents began calling for the construction of a primary school. Mohit Kumar, a resident of Kashyap Colony, was quoted in a Times of India article addressing the issue, saying:

"There seems to be a consensus in the village that we should demand a school after we get power lines running here. Not a lot of people get to send their children to school. Children have to either go to Kanshi village, which is two kilometers away, or to Partapur town, which is around five kilometers away. This may not seem like a big distance to us, but it is considerable distance for primary school kids. Besides, there aren't enough schools for us since the village has a population of over 2,000 people here. There should at least be a primary school here."

Pankaj Sharma of Meerut Nagrik Adhikar Manch (MNAM), a Meerut-based NGO, spoke of the ongoing effort to petition the local government:

"It is good to see that the wires are being laid out in the village for the first time ever. It looks like they will have power by Diwali, maybe even before. This was a basic right of the villagers which they should have gotten long ago. Just like electricity, education too is a basic right. The village does not have a single school. Now that the villagers are more aware of their rights, they are also demanding a school. Villagers have said they even have space for a school here. We will meet officials soon and put this demand forward. Earlier, authorities ignored the people here but now they are forced to listen. That is because they are united and more organized than before."

== Healthcare ==
There are no clinics in the village, and the nearest hospital is the P. L. Sharma Hospital 20 kilometers away.

== Transportation ==
There are no paved roads leading up to or in the village.
