= Kashyap (caste) =

Indian caste

- Language: Hindi, English, Punjabi

Origin
- Region of origin: Uttar Pradesh; Madhya Pradesh; Chandigarh; Punjab; Haryana; Himachal Pradesh; Jammu & Kashmir

Other names
- Related names: Mehra, Mahra, Mehra Rajput, Koshyal, Kanshilya, Koli

The Kashyap Rajput or Kashyap are a caste in India. They are sometimes called the Koshyal or Kanshilya.

== Community ==
Kashyap is originally one of the eight primary gotras (clans) of the Brahmins, being derived from Kashyapa, the name of a rishi (hermit) from whom the eponymous gotra Brahmins believe to have descended. The Brahmanical clan system was later emulated by people as an early example of the sanskritisation process. The All-India Kashyap Rajput Mahasabha pressure group was established prior to the 1941 census of British India to lobby the census authorities to record the caste as Kashyap Rajput rather than by any other name.

== Affirmative action status ==
There were proposals in 2013 that some or all of the communities related to Kashyap in the state should be reclassified as Scheduled Castes under India's system of positive discrimination; this would have involved declassifying them from the Other Backwards Class category. Whether or not this would happen was a significant issue in the campaign for the 2014 Indian general election.

They are among 17 OBC communities that were again proposed for Scheduled Caste status by the Samajwadi Party-controlled Government of Uttar Pradesh. However, this proposal, which relates to votebank politics, has been stayed by the courts; the prior attempt had been rejected by the Government of India.

== See also ==
- Kashyap (surname)
- Koli people
