= List of hill stations in India =

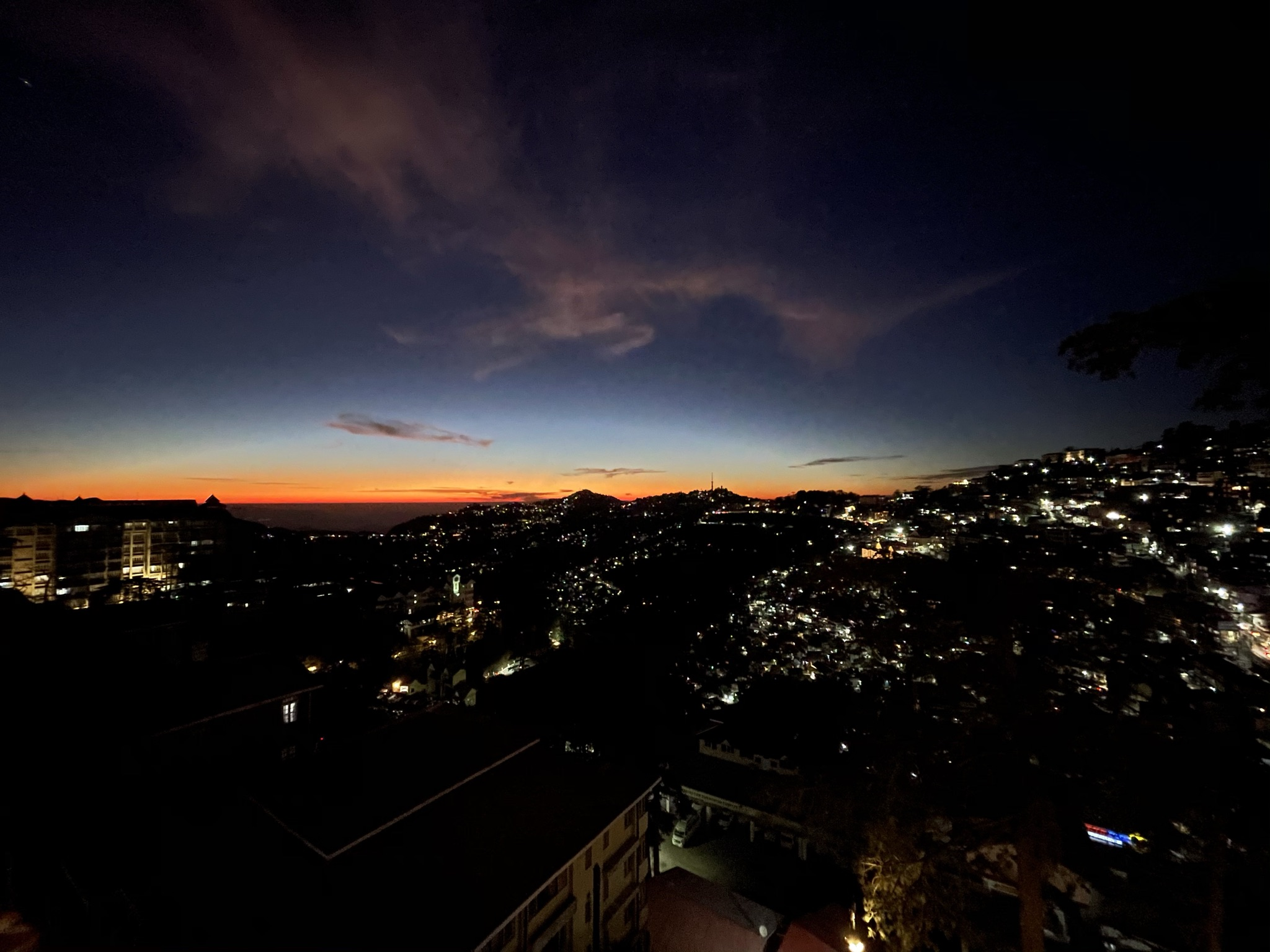
Shimla, often called queen of hill stations

Indian Hill stations are high-altitude towns located across located India’s mountain ranges. They were built under British rule, often from the ground up, and the oldest date back to the early 19th century. Originally they were designed to be a refuge from the blistering heat of the Indian summertime.

The Indian subcontinent has seven principal mountain ranges and the largest of all is the Himalayas that lies in the northern part of India. The famous peaks and ranges include the Kangchenjunga range in the Eastern Himalayas which frames the hill stations of Darjeeling and Gangtok. The Shivalik range also has some famous hill stations that includes Kasauli, Mussoorie and many more.

Most hill stations in India were developed by the British around a central mall to get respite from the oppressive summer heat. Many have picturesque lakes as their focal point, making them excellent places for boating activities.

Most hill stations in India are located in the states of Himachal Pradesh, Jammu and Kashmir, Ladakh, Manipur, Uttarakhand, Sikkim, West Bengal, Arunachal Pradesh, Mizoram, Nagaland and Meghalaya in the Himalayas and in the states of Gujarat, Maharashtra, Karnataka, Goa, Kerala, and Tamil Nadu in Western Ghats. Some are located in Eastern Ghats of Tamil Nadu, Andhra Pradesh, Odisha and West Bengal. Notable hill stations in India are listed below by state.

Since a number of these hill stations attract large numbers of tourists in summer as well as other times of the year, they are well connected by rail, road, and air services to major Indian cities.

== History ==
Nandi Hills was developed by Ganga Dynasty in 11th century. It was also used by Tipu Sultan (1751 - 1799) as a summer retreat.

Hill stations in British India were established for a variety of reasons. After the revolt of 1857 the "British sought further distance from what they saw as a "disease-ridden" land by escape to the Himalayas in the north and Nilgiri Hills in the south", a pattern which started even before 1857. Other factors included anxieties about the dangers of life in India, among them "fear of degeneration brought on by too long residence in a debilitating land." The hill stations were meant to reproduce the home country, illustrated in Lord Lytton's statement about Ootacamund, in the 1870s, "such beautiful English rain, such delicious English mud." Shimla was officially made the "summer capital of India" in the 1860s and hill stations "served as vital centers of political and military power, especially after the 1857 revolt."

Dane Kennedy, following Monika Bührlein, identifies three stages in the evolution of hill stations in India: high refuge to hill station, and hill station to town. The first settlements started in the 1820s, primarily as sanitoria. In the 1840s and 1850s, there was a wave of new hill stations, with the main impetus being "places to rest and recuperate from the arduous life on the plains". In the second half of the 19th century, there was a period of consolidation with few new hill stations. In the final phase, "hill stations reached their zenith in the late nineteenth century. The political importance of the official stations was underscored by the inauguration of large and costly public-building projects."

Siddharth Pandey analyses the femininity often ascribed to Indian hills stations, in their nomenclature (such as 'the Queen of hills', as claimed by Shimla, Ooty, and several other hill stations) as well as the visual aesthetic of their landscapes. He argues that compared to the 'terrifying, sublime landscape' of the high Himalayan peaks and ridges, the hill stations have a gentler aspect, manageable and conducive for domestication. With ideas of domesticity having been traditionally associated with the feminine and household spheres, hill stations, which were developed by the colonialists as 'homes away from home', acquired over time a sense of being feminine, in terms of both their natural as well as their architectural beauty.

== Andaman and Nicobar Islands ==
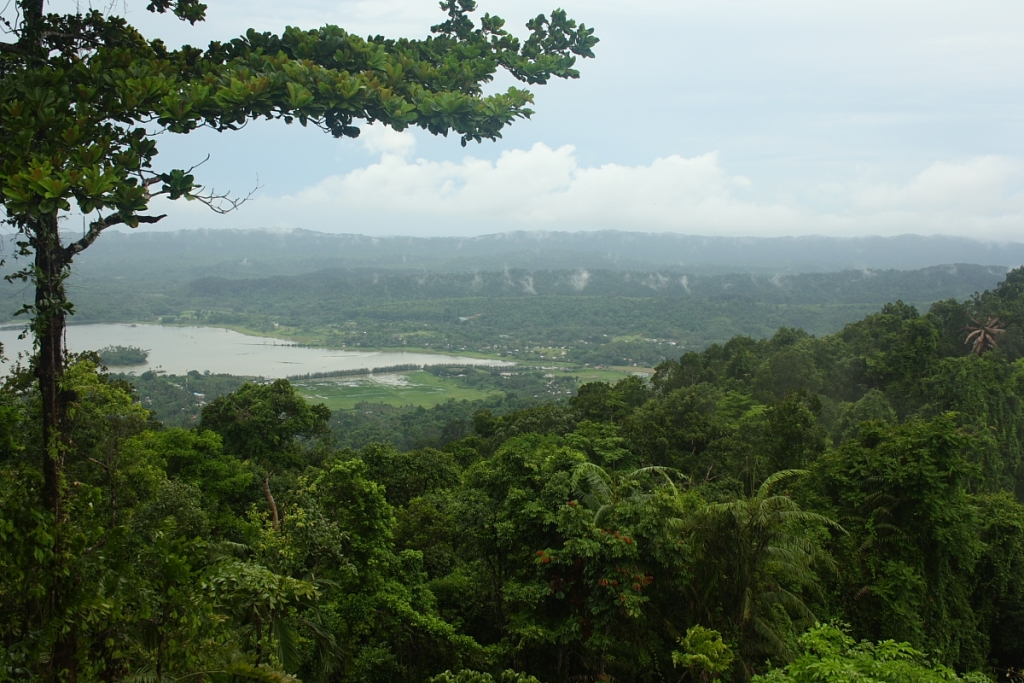

- Mount Harriett

== Andhra Pradesh hill stations ==
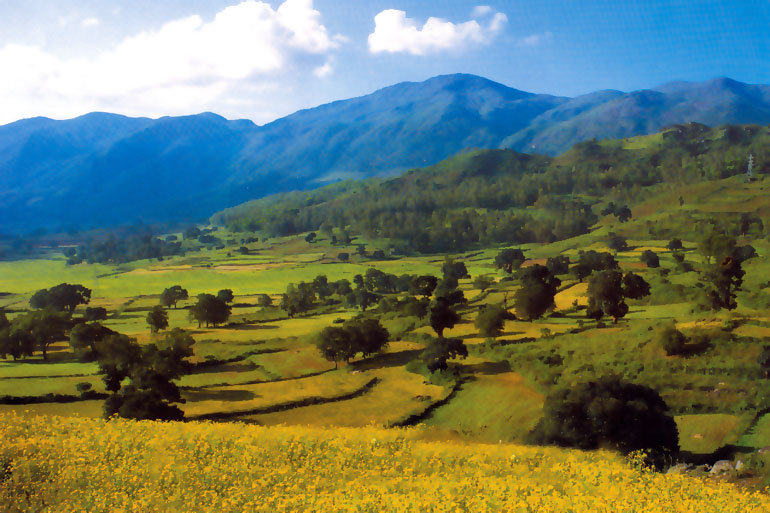
Araku Valley, Andhra Pradesh

Place	District
Araku Valley	Visakhapatnam
Chintapalle	Visakhapatnam
Horsley Hills	Chittoor
Lambasingi	Visakhapatnam
Paderu	Visakhapatnam
Papi Hills	East Godavari and West Godavari
Sri Sailam	Kurnool
Tirumala	Chittoor
Guntaseema	Vishakapatnam
Salur	Vizianagaram
Maredumilli	East Godavari
Mothugudem	Khammam and East Godavari
Chintur	East Godavari
Rajavommangi	East Godavari
Doranala	Prakasam
Giddalur	Prakasam
Donkarayi	East Godavari
Sileru	Vishakapatnam
Rampachodavaram	East Godavari
Cumbum hills	Prakasam
Nekkanti	Prakasam
Chinthala	Prakasam
Ardhaveedu	Prakasam
Peddarutla	Prakasam
Killada	Srikakulam
Seedhi	Srikakulam
Guddam	Vizianagaram
Kuneru	Vizianagaram
Chaparai	East Godavari
Polluru	East Godavari
Pamuleru	East Godavari
Musuru	East Godavari
Gurtedu	East Godavari
Kamavaram	West Godavari
Koruteru	West Godavari
Koida	West Godavari
Tekuru	West Godavari
Doramamidi	West Godavari
Dengam	Vishakapatnam
Darakonda	Vishakapatnam
Paderu	Vishakapatnam
Panasa	Vishakapatnam
Pitakota	Vishakapatnam
Kudumulu	Vishakapatnam
Peddavalasa	Vishakapatnam
Basula	Vishakapatnam
Tulam	Vishakapatnam
Bakuru	Vishakapatnam
Borra	Vishakapatnam
Gautham	Vishakapatnam
Vayya	Vishakapatnam
Sundipenta	Kurnool
Vanjangi	Alluri Sitharama Raju

== Arunachal Pradesh ==
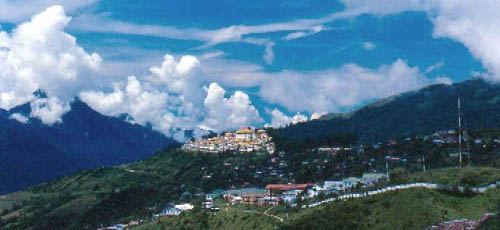
Tawang

Place	District
Along	West Siang
Bomdila	West Kameng
Khonsa	Tirap
Roing	Lower Dibang Valley
Tawang	Tawang
Ziro	Lower Subansiri

== Assam ==
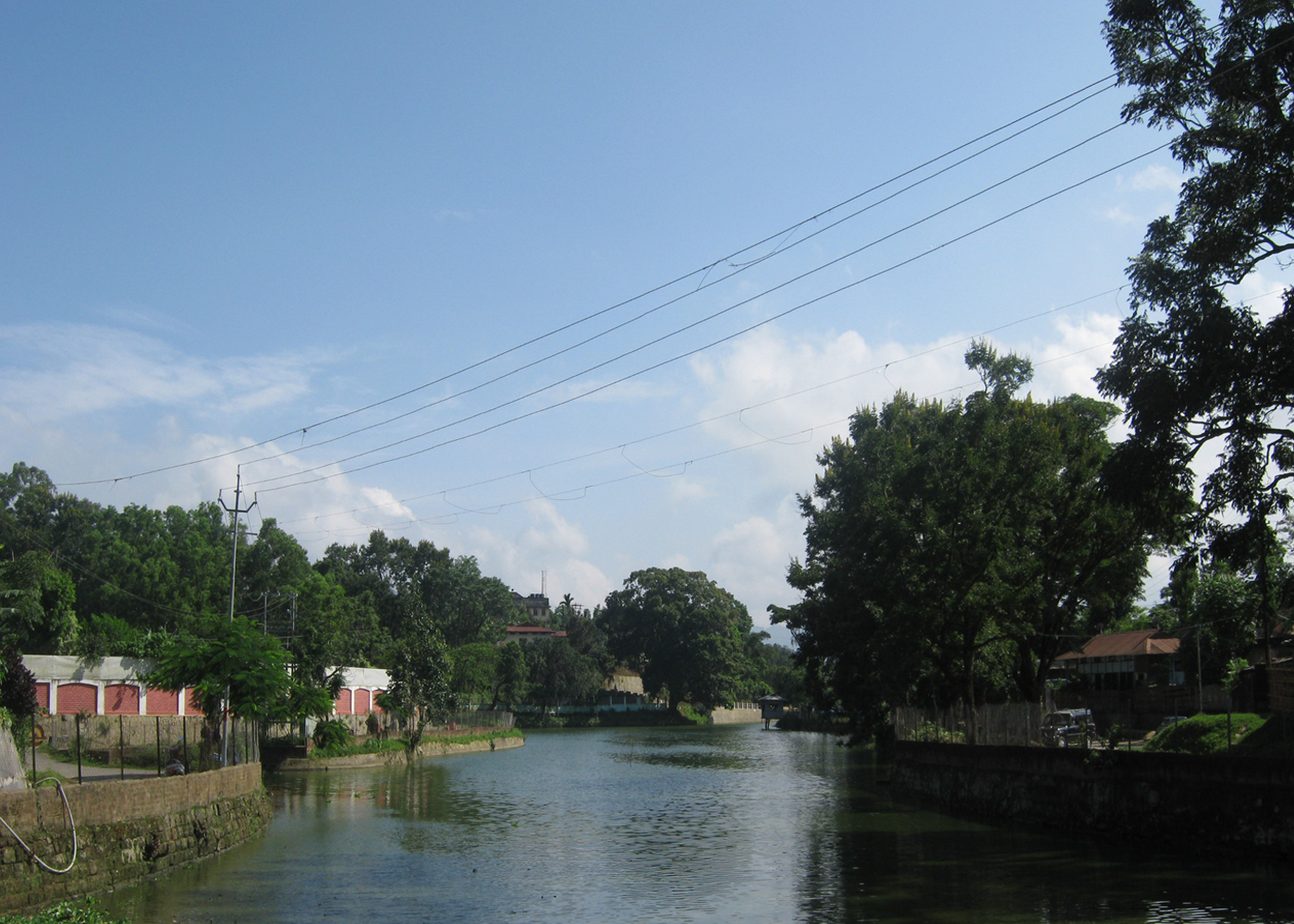
Haflong

Place	District
Haflong	Dima Hasao
Hamren	West Karbi Anglong
Jatinga	Dima Hasao
Maibang	Dima Hasao
Umrangso	Dima Hasao

== Bihar ==
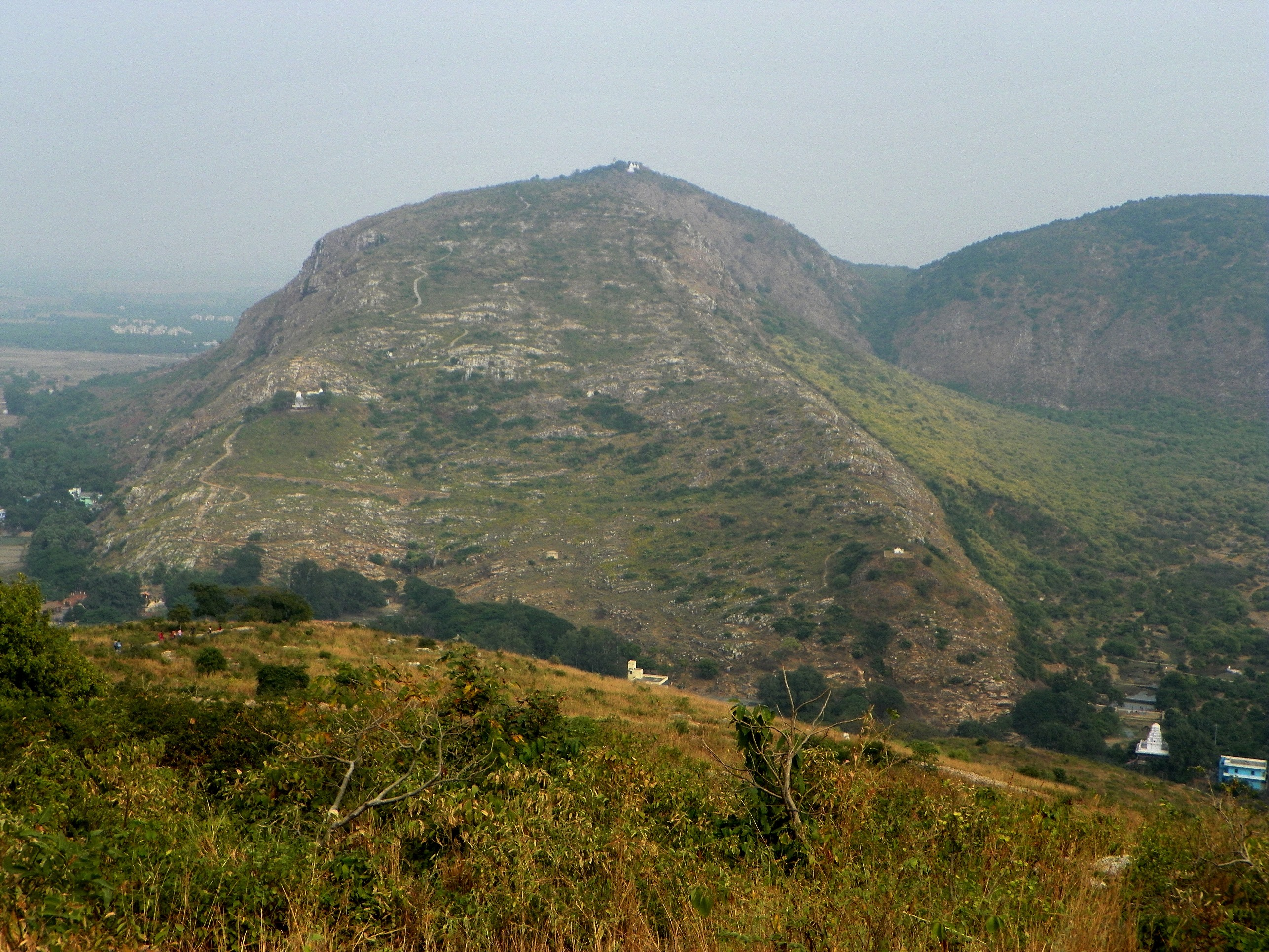
Rajgir hills

Place	District
Gurpa Hills	Gaya, India
Rajgir hills	Nalanda, India
Bateshwar hills	Bhagalpur, India
Kaimur Range	Rohtas, India
Simultala	Jamui, India

== Chhattisgarh ==
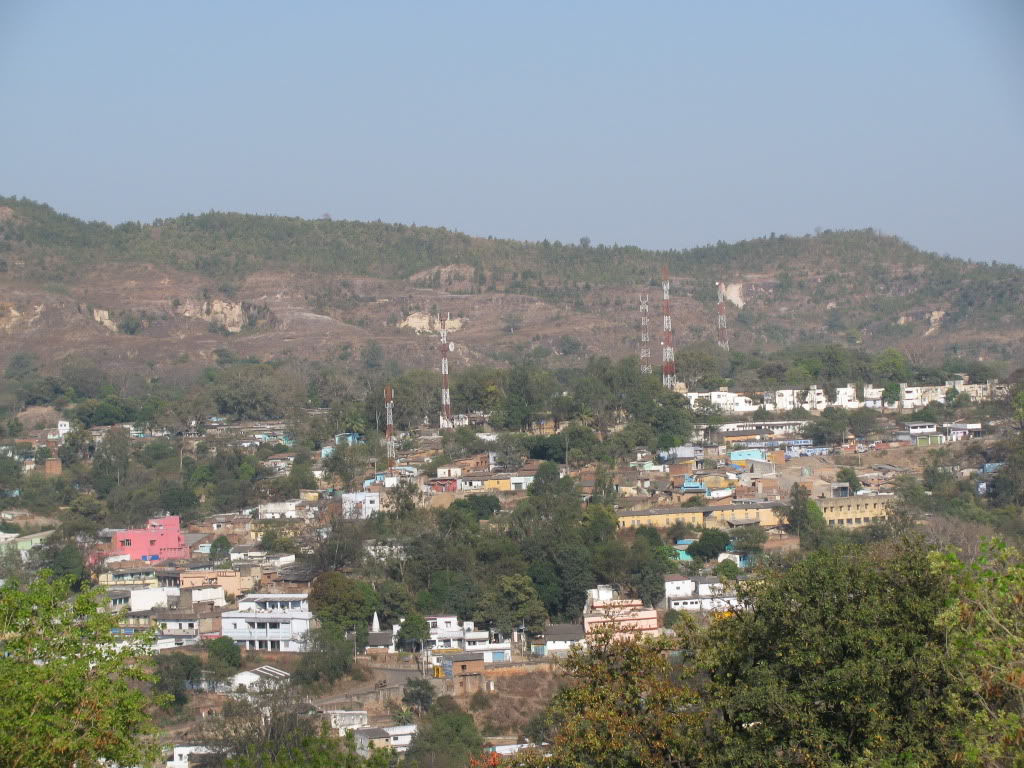

Place	District
Akash Nagar	Dantewada
Amarkantak Lapha hill	Bilaspur
Chirmiri	Koriya
Mainpat	Surguja

== Goa ==
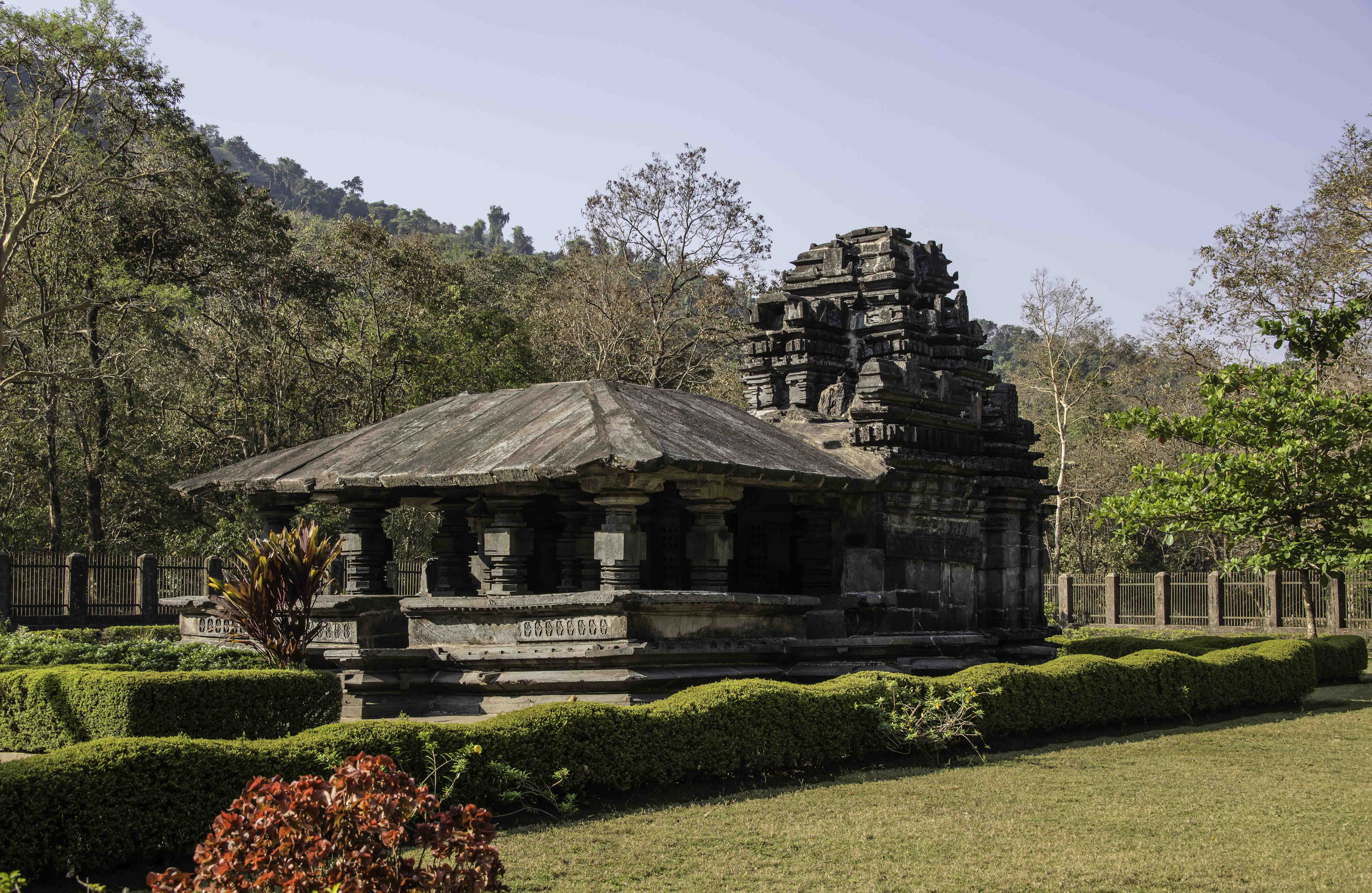
Molem

Place	District
Molem	South Goa

== Gujarat ==
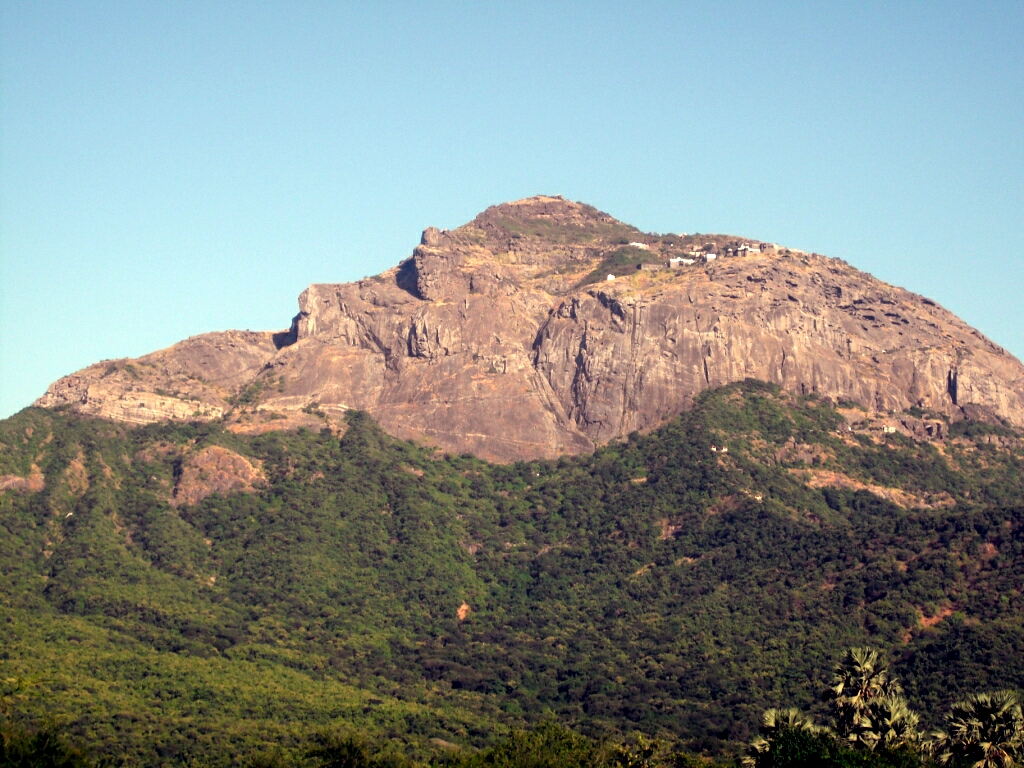
Girnar

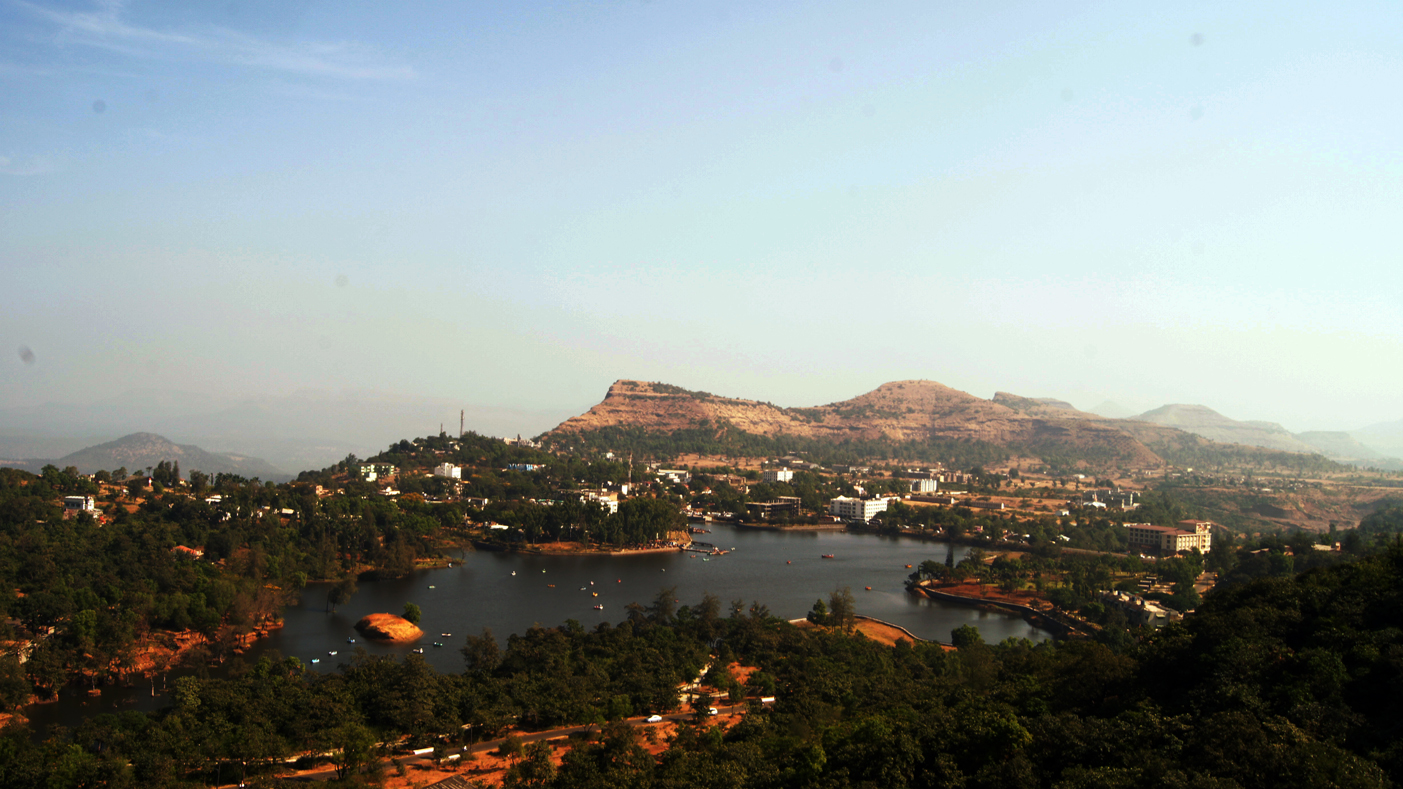
Saputara

Place	District
Ahwa	Dang
Awala	Banaskantha
Bardipada	Dang
Dediyapada	Narmada
Garvi	Dang
Girnar	Junagadh
Junaraj	Narmada
Kapasiya	Banaskantha
Karaza	Banaskantha
Khoba	Valsad
Koshmal	Dang
Mahal	Dang
Nilosi	Valsad
Palitana	Bhavnagar
Saputara	Dang
Subir	Dang
Sutharpada	Valsad
Wilson Hills	Valsad

== Haryana ==
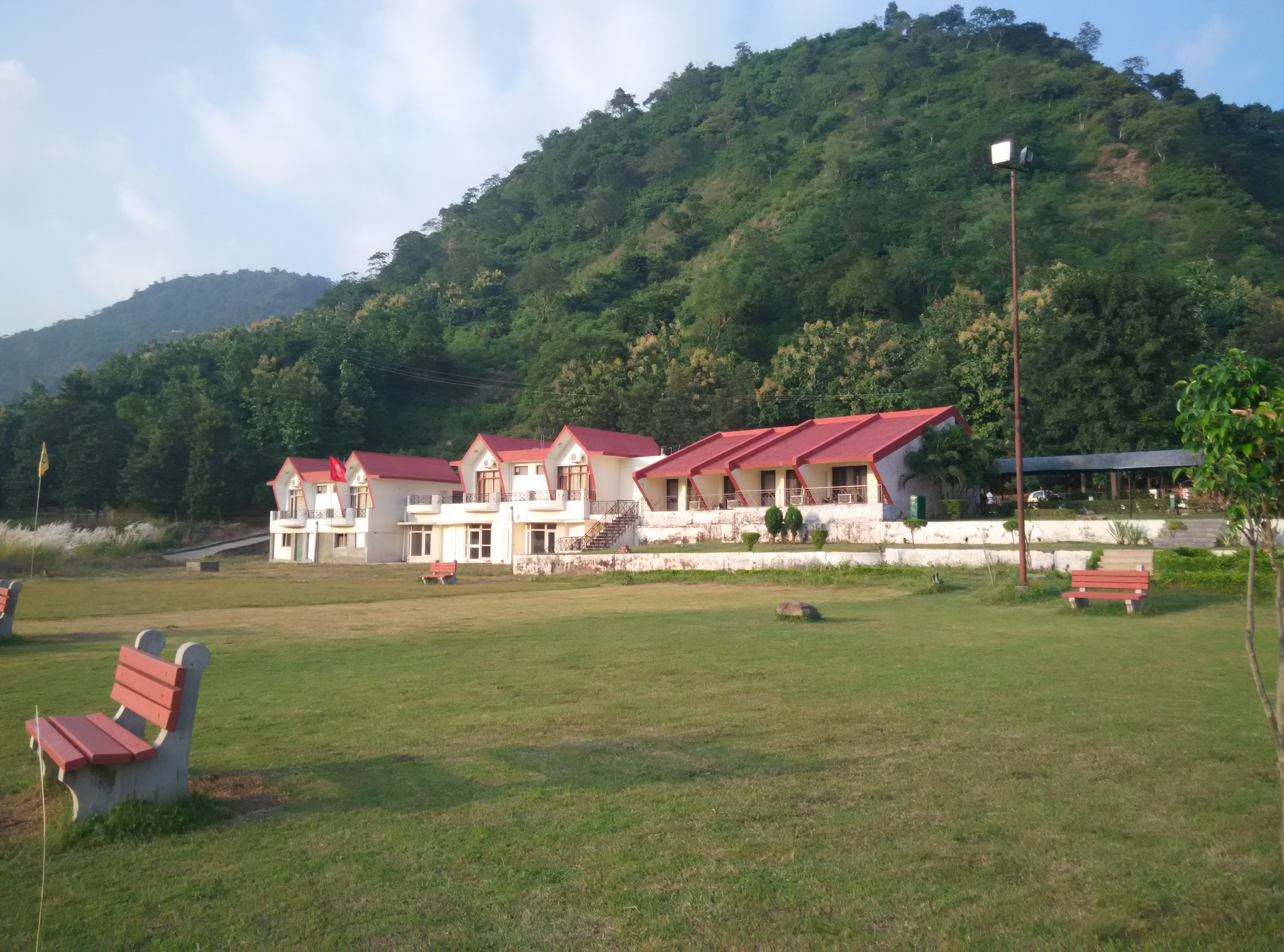
Morni

Place	District
Morni	Panchkula
Dhoshi	Mahendragarh

== Himachal Pradesh ==
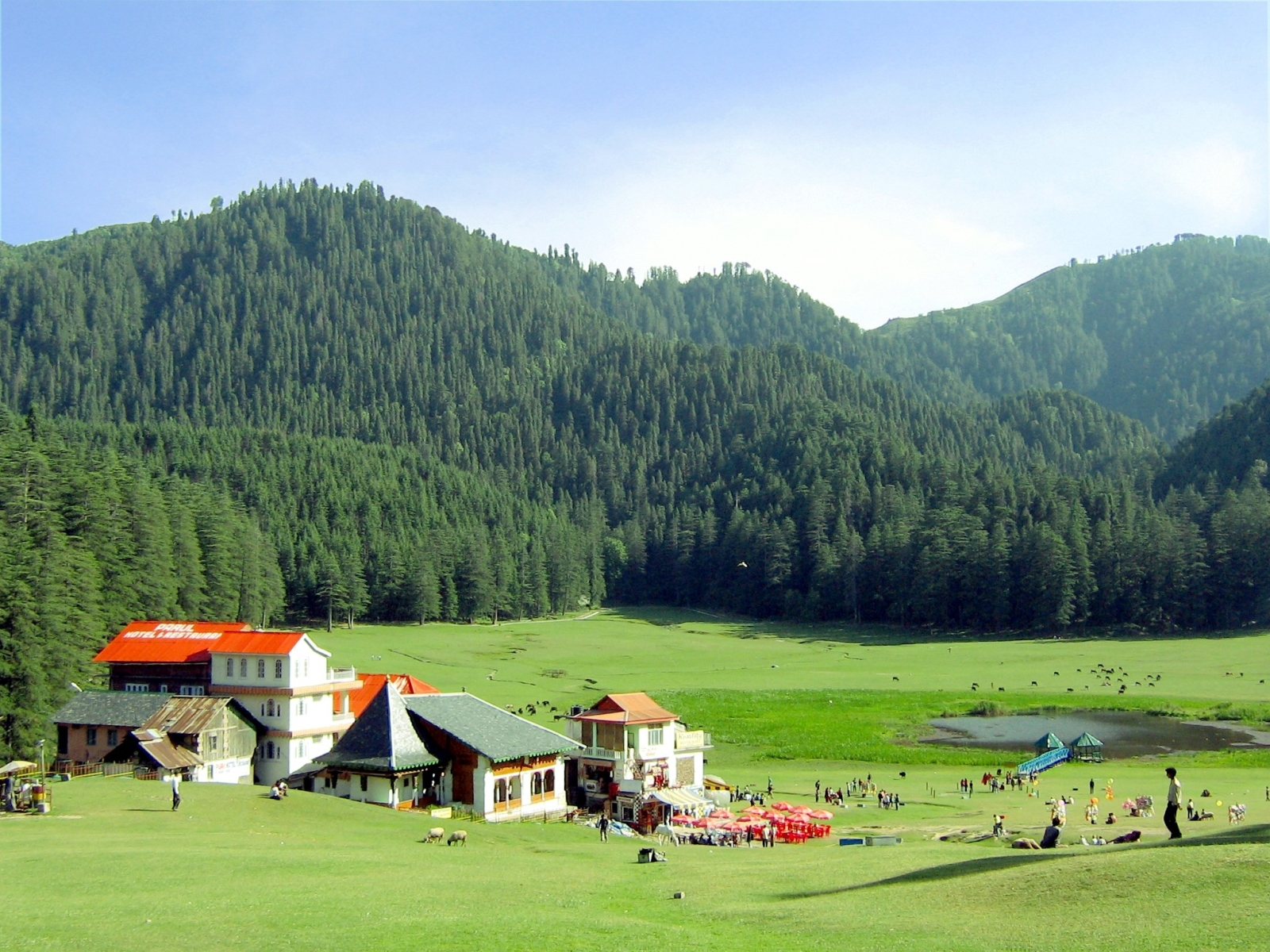
Khajjiar, Himachal Pradesh, also known as mini Switzerland of India

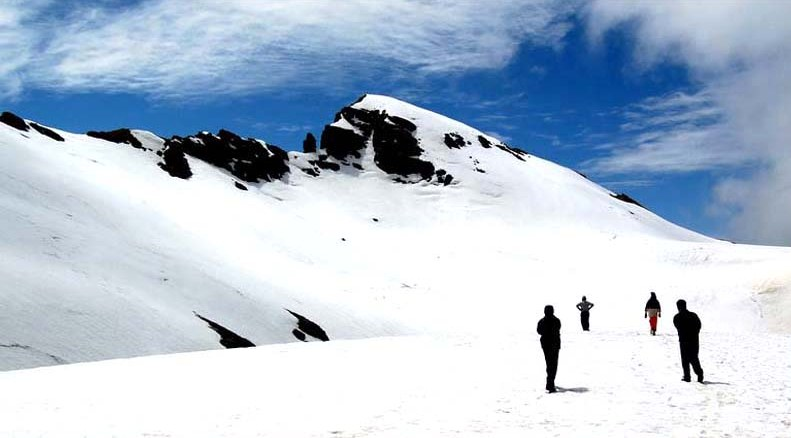
Skiing in Manali, Himachal Pradesh

Place	District
Banjar	Kullu district
Barog	Solan district
Barot	Mandi district
Baru Sahib	Sirmaur district
Bhaba Nagar	Kinnaur district
Bharmour	Chamba district
Bhuntar	Kullu district
Chail	Solan district
Chamba	Chamba district
Chitkul	Kinnaur district
Chaupal	Shimla district
Churdhar	Sirmaur district
Dagshai	Solan district
Dalhousie	Chamba district
Darcha	Lahaul Spiti district
Dharamshala	Kangra district
Hatkoti	Shimla district
Haripurdhar	Sirmaur district
Jispa	Lahaul Spiti district
Jubbal	Shimla district
Kalpa	Kinnaur district
Kandaghat	Solan district
Karsog	Mandi district
Kasol	Kullu district
Kasauli	Solan district
Kaza	Lahaul Spiti district
Keylong	Lahaul Spiti district
Khajjiar	Chamba district
Koksar	Lahaul Spiti district
Kotgarh	Shimla district
Kotkhai	Shimla district
Kugti	Chamba district
Kufri	Shimla district
Kullu	Kullu district
Mandi	Mandi district
Malana	Kullu district
Manali	Kullu district
Mashobra	Shimla district
McLeod Ganj	Kangra district
Naggar	Kullu district
Nako	Lahaul Spiti district
Narkanda	Shimla district
Nirmand	Kullu district
Palampur	Kangra district
Rajgarh	Sirmaur district
Reckong Peo	Kinnaur district
Renuka Ji	Sirmaur district
Rewalsar	Mandi district
Rohtang	Kullu district
Salooni	Chamba district
Sangla	Kinnaur district
Sarahan	Shimla district
Shillai	Sirmaur district
Shimla	Shimla district
Shoghi	Shimla district
Sissu	Lahaul Spiti district
Sunder Nagar	Mandi district
Sunni	Shimla district
Tabo	Lahaul Spiti district
Tattapani	Mandi district
Tosh	Kullu district
Theog	Shimla district
Triund	Kangra district
Vashisht	Kullu district
Yulla Khas	Kinnaur district

== Jammu and Kashmir ==
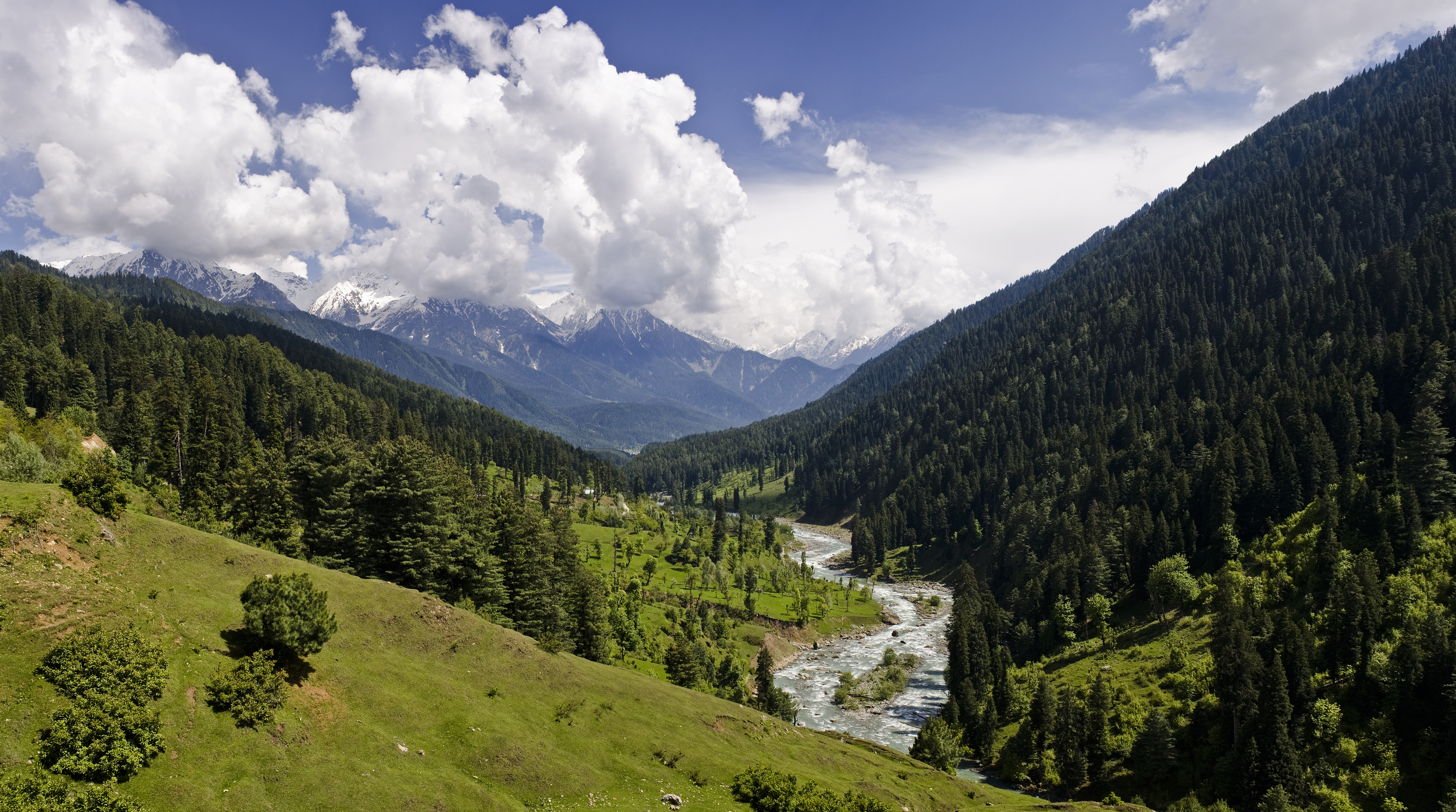
Pahalgam Valley

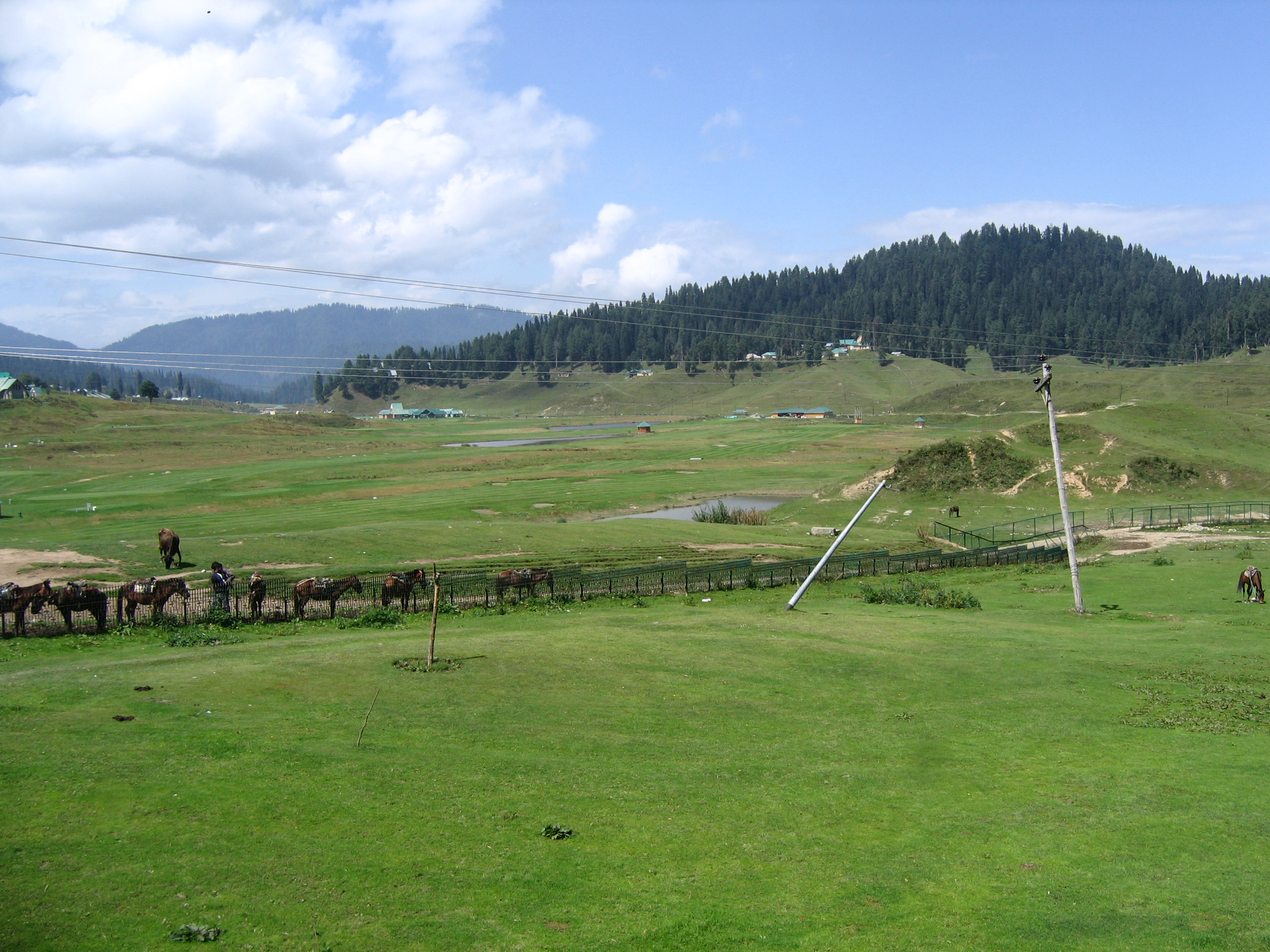
Gulmarg

Kashmir region		Jammu region	
Place	District	Place	District
Aru	Anantnag	Bhaderwah	Doda
Doodhpathri	Budgam	Lal Draman	Doda
Gulmarg	Baramulla	Patnitop	Udhampur
Pahalgam	Anantnag	Jantroon Dhar	Doda
Sonamarg	Ganderbal	Lal Draman	Doda
Srinagar	Srinagar	Bhal Padri	Doda
Tosamaidan	Budgam	Devigol	Kishtwar
Yusmarg	Budgam	Bimal Nag	Kishtwar
		Bani	Kathua

== Jharkhand ==
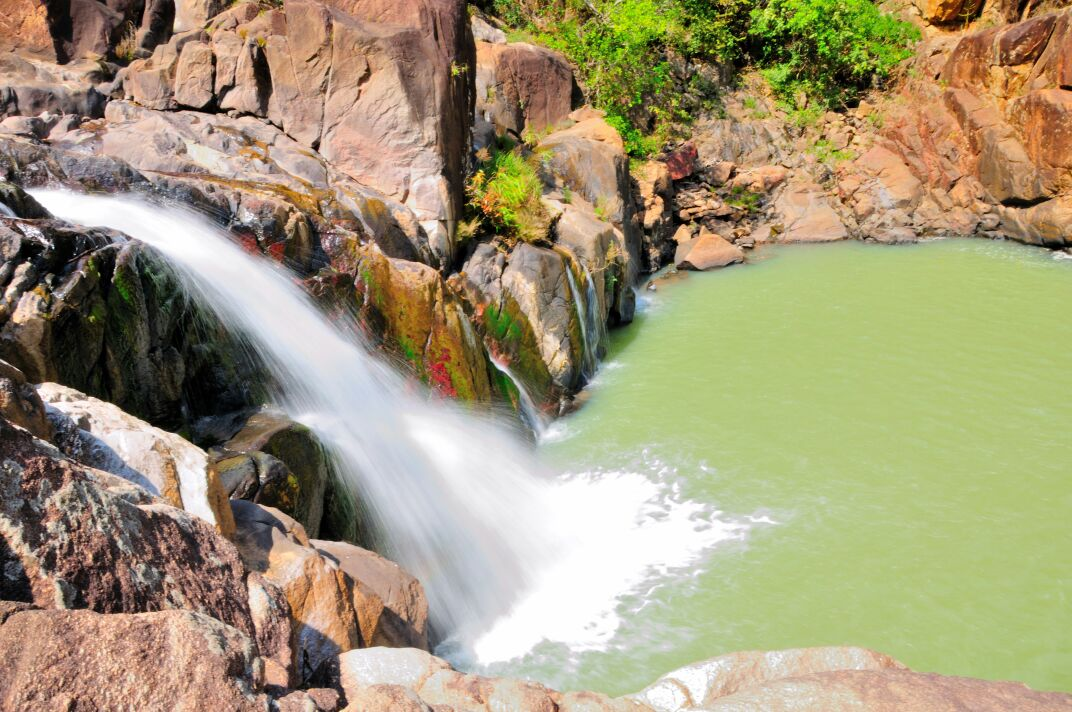
Netarhat

Place	District
Meghahatuburu	West Singhbhum
Netarhat	Latehar
Patratu	Ramgarh
McCluskieganj	Ranchi

== Karnataka ==
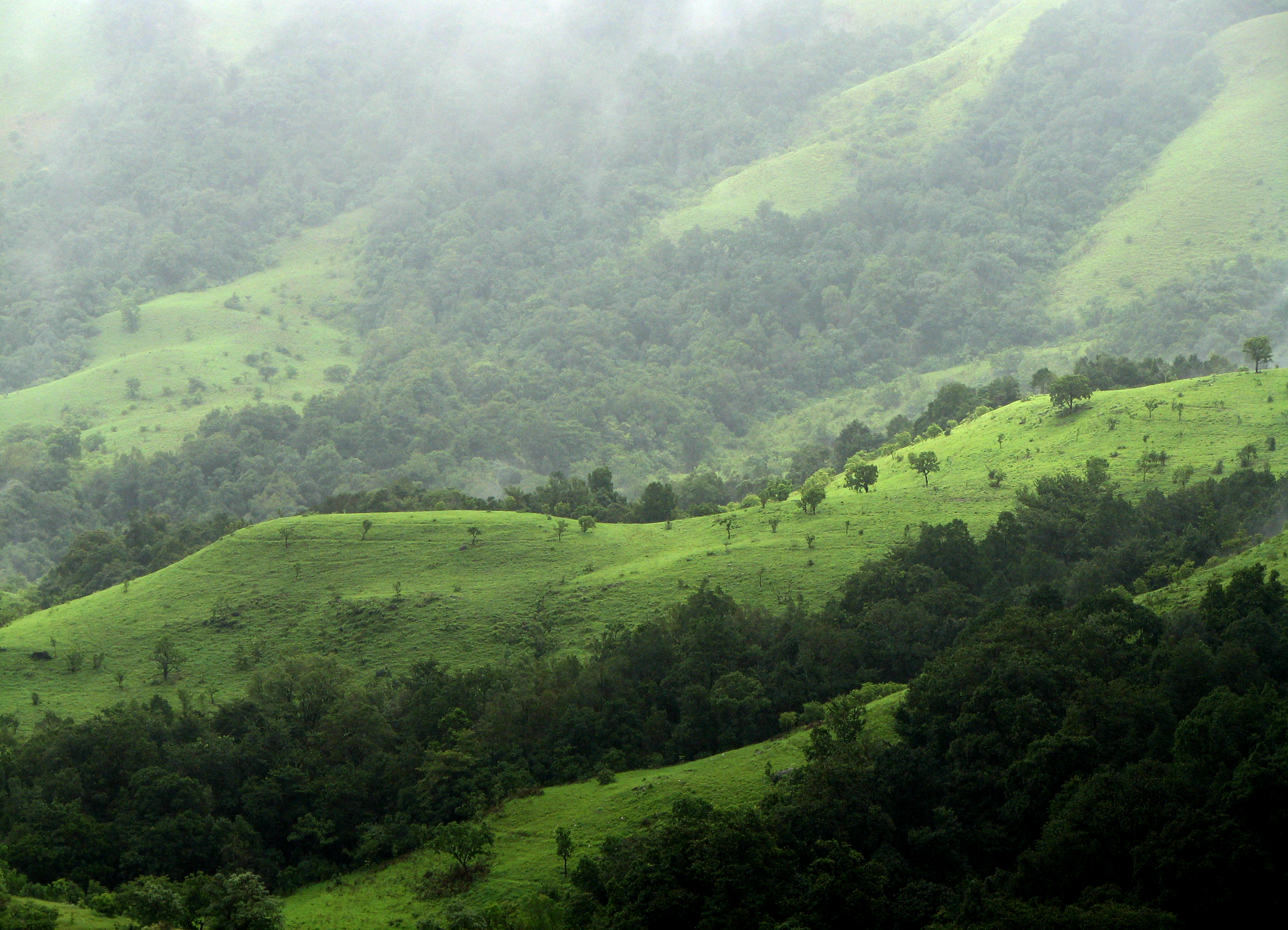
Shola Grasslands in Kudremukh, Karnataka

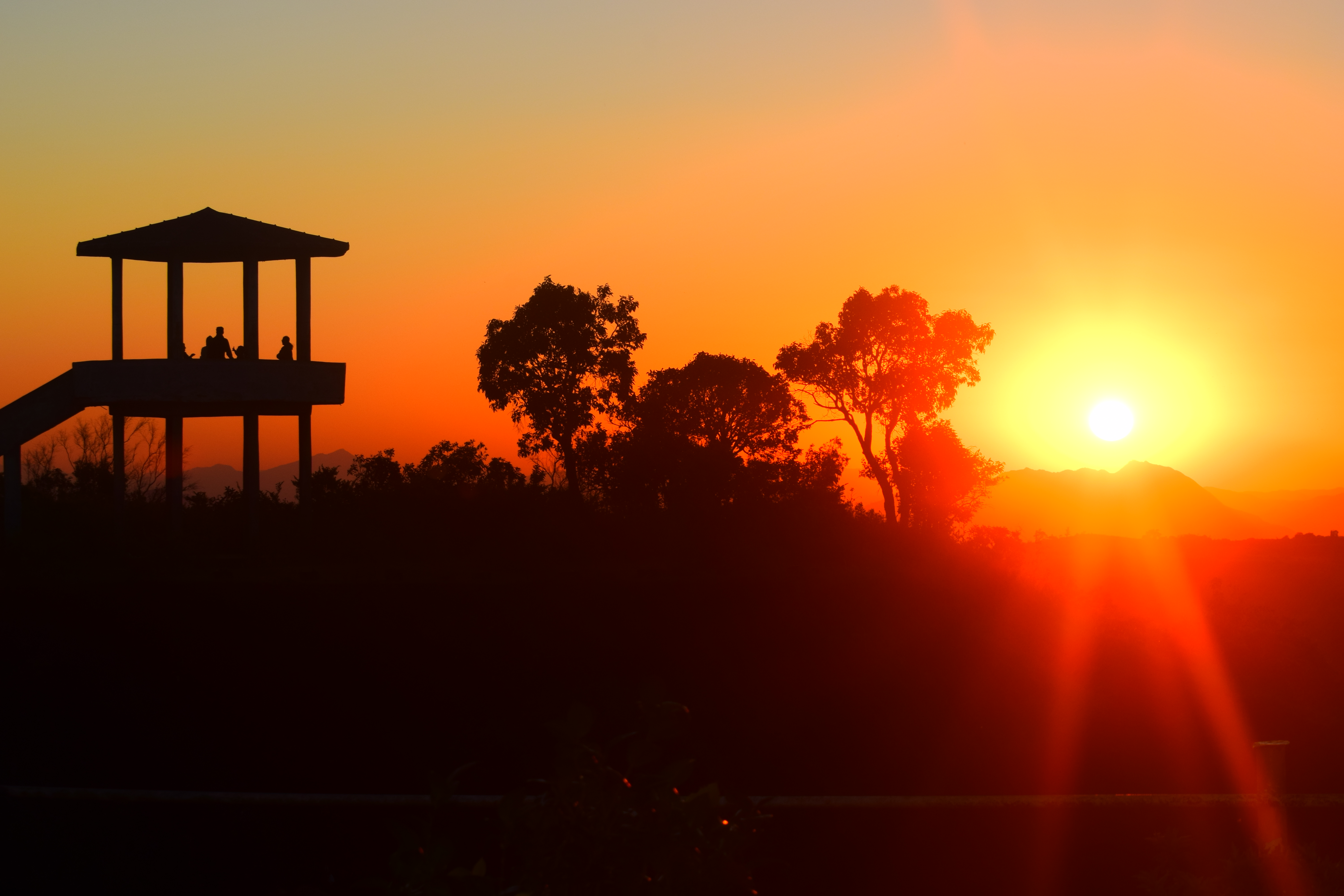
Sunset at viewpoint in Kemmangundi

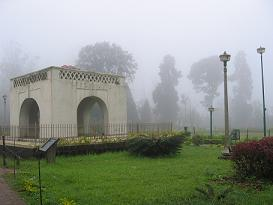
Raja's Seat, one of the major tourist attractions in Madikeri

Place	District
Agumbe	Shimoga
Arehalli	Hassan
Arkalgud	Hassan and Kodagu
Baba Budangiri	Chikkamagaluru
Ballupet	Hassan
Belagodu	Hassan
Belur	Hassan
Biligiriranga Hills	Chamarajanagar
Bisle	Hassan
Changadihalli	Hassan
Chikkamagaluru	Chikmagalur
Charmadi	Dakshina Kannada and Chikkamagaluru
Dandeli	Uttara Kannada
Devimane	Uttara Kannada
Chikkabemmathi	Hassan
Hulikal	Shimoga
Jog	Shimoga
Jogimatti	Chitradurga
Jamalabad	Dakshina Kannada
Kemmangundi	Chikkamagaluru
Kodachadri	Shivamogga
Kodlipet	Kodagu
Konanur	Hassan
Kudrasthe	Hassan
Kudremukh	Chikkamagaluru
Kumarahalli	Kodagu
Koppa	Chikkamagaluru
Kushalnagar	Kodagu
Madhugiri	Madhugiri
Madikeri	Kodagu
Male Mahadeshwara Hills	Chamarajanagara
Mudigere	Chikkamagaluru
Mullayanagiri	Chikkamagaluru
Nandi Hills	Chikkaballapur
Pushpagiri	Dakshina Kannada, Hassan and Kodagu
Sakleshpur	Hassan
Shanivarsanthe	Kodagu
Sirangalli	Kodagu
Sirsi	Uttara Kannada
Somanahalli	Hassan and Kodagu(Arkalgud and Somwarpet Taluk)
Somwarpet	Kodagu
Skandagiri	Chikkaballapura
Virajpet	Kodagu

== Kerala ==
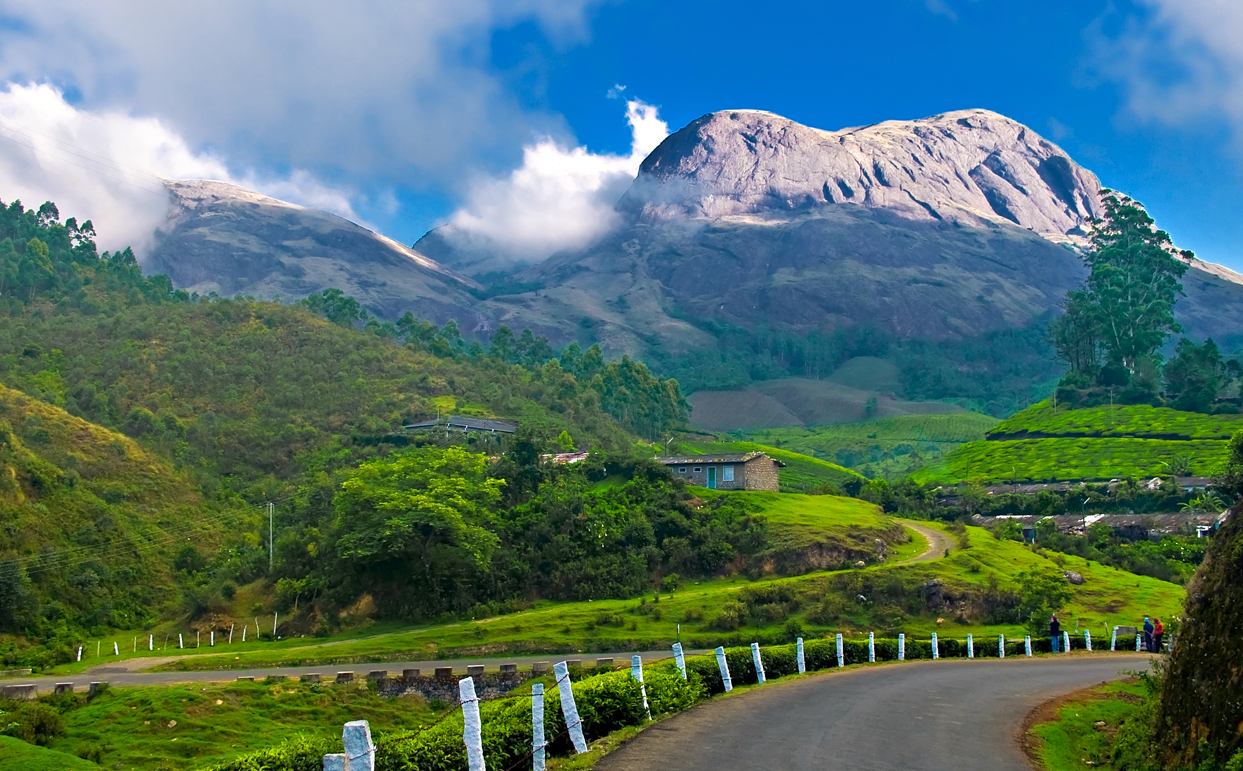
Munnar, Idukki district, Kerala

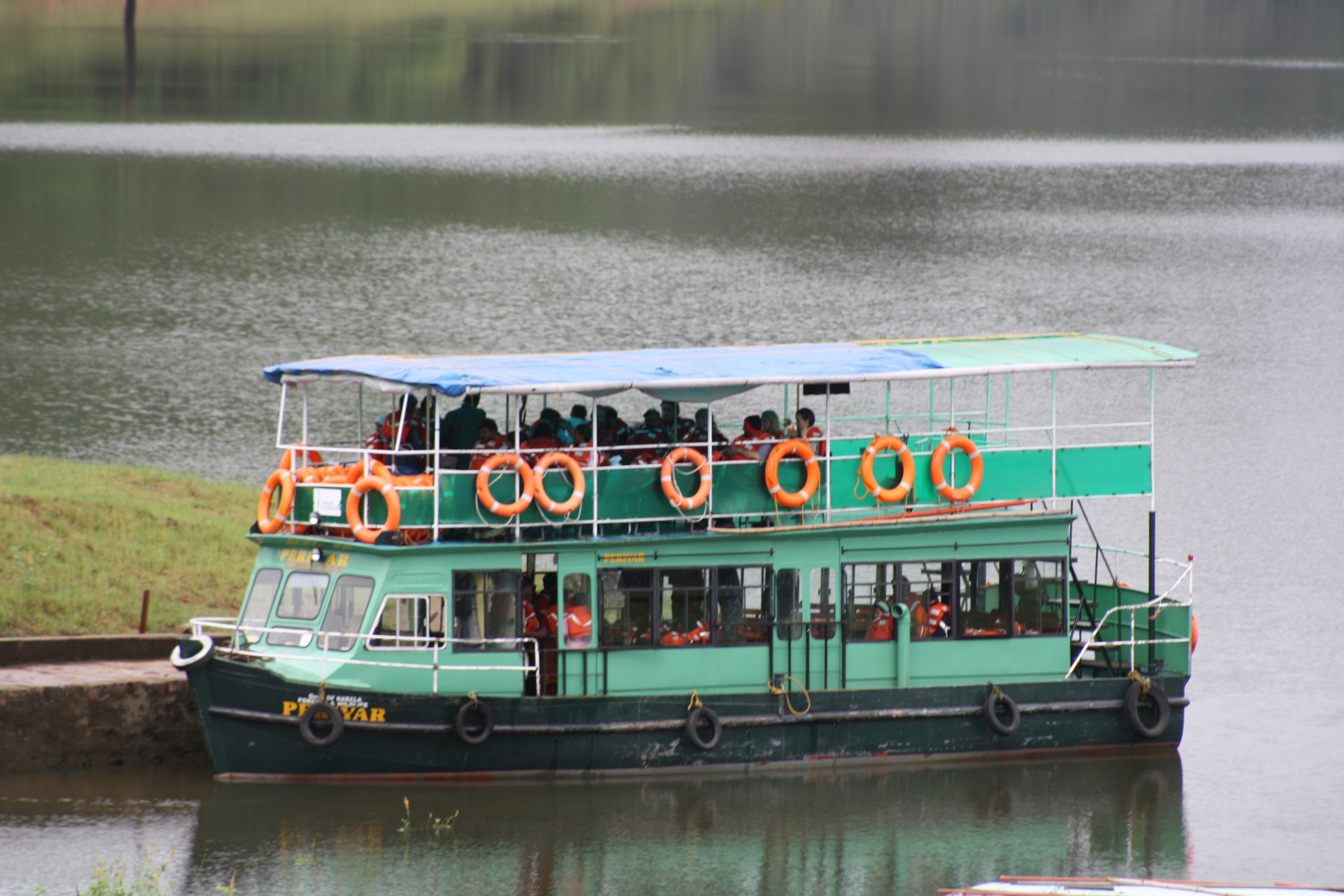
Thekkady, Kerala

Place	District
Achenkovil	Pathnamthitta
Agali	Palakkad
Agasthiyamalai	Thiruvananthapuram
Ambanad Hills	Kollam
Ambalavayal	Wayanad
Arimbra Hills, Malappuram	Malappuram
Anakkampoyil	Kozhikode
Anchuruli	Idukki
Aralam	Kannur
Anakkara	Idukki
Amboori	Thiruvananthapuram
Aryankavu	Kollam
Athirapally	Thrissur
Ayyampuzha	Ernakulam
Ayyankunnu	Wayanad
Banasura Hill	Wayanad
Bison Valley	Idukki
Bonacaud	Thiruvananthapuram
Brimore	Thiruvananthapuram
Chadayamangalam	Kollam District
Charalkunnu	Pathanamthitta
Chathurangappara	Idukki
Cheemeni	Kasargod
Chinnakanal	Idukki
Chittar	Pathanamthitta
Devikulam	Idukki
Dharmathadka	Kasargod
Elapeedika	Kannur
Elappara	Idukki
Ezhimala	Kannur
Gavi	Pathanamthitta
Ilaveezha Poonchira	Idukki
Illikkal Kallu	Kotayam
Iritty	Kannur
Kakkadampoyil	Kozhikode
Kallar	Thiruvananthapuram
Kalpetta	Wayanad
Kambilikandam	Idukki
Kanthalloor	Idukki
Karapuzha Dam	Wayanad
Kattappana	Idukki
Kinnakorai	Palakkad
Kulamavu Dam	Idukki
Kulathupuzha	Kollam
Kodanad	Ernakulam
Kodikuthimala	Malappuram
Konni	Pathnamthitta
Koorachundu	Kozhikode
Kottancheri Hills	Kasaragod
Kottakkunnu Hill Station	Malappuram
Kottiyoor	Kannur District
Kulathupuzha	Kollam
Kumily	Idukki
Kuttampuzha	Ernakulam
Kuttikkanam	Idukki
Lakkidi	Wayanad
Madayipara	Kannur
Malakkappara	Thrissur
Malayattur	Ernakulam
Malom	Kasargod
Mananthavady	Wayanad
Maniyar	Pathanamthitta
Marayoor	Idukki
Melukavu	Kotayam
Meppadi	Wayanad
Moolamattom	Idukki
Mundakayam	Kottayam
Munnar	Idukki
Muthanga	Wayanad
Nedumkandam	Idukki District
Nelliampathi	Palakkad
Padavayal	Palakkad
Painavu	Idukki
Pakshi Pathalam	Wayanad
Panchalimedu	Idukki
Parambikulam	Palakkad
Parunthumpara	Idukki
Pathanamthitta	Pathanamthitta
Peermade	Idukki
Peruvannamuzhi	Kozhikode
Ponmudi	Thiruvananthapuram
Poomala	Thrissur
Poonjar	Kottayam
Ramakkalmedu	Idukki
Ranipuram Hills	Kasaragod
Ranni	Pathnamthitta
Santhanpara	Idukki District
Seethathode	Pathanamthitta
Soordelu Hill Station	Kasargod
Sulthan Bathery	Wayanad
Suryanelli	Idukki
Teekoy	Kotayam
Thattekkad	Ernakulam
Thekkady	Idukki
Thenmala	Kollam
Thodupuzha	Idukki District
Tirunelli	Wayanad
Udumbanchola	Idukki
Vagamon	Idukki
Vaithalmala	Kannur
Vandiperiyar	Idukki
Vaduvanchal	Wayanad
Vandanmedu	Idukki
Vattavada	Idukki
Vazhachal	Thrissur
Vazhichal	Thiruvananthapuram
Vellarimala	Kozhikode
Vithura	Thiruvananthapuram
Vythiri	Wayanad

== Ladakh ==
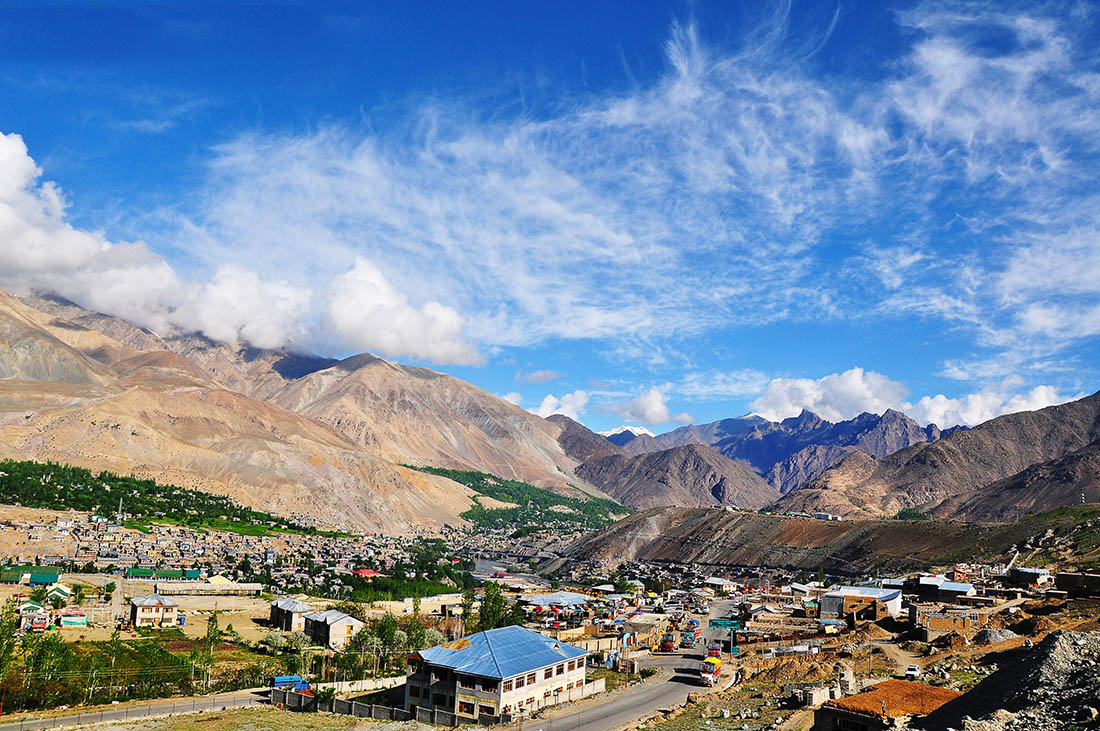
Kargil Town

Place	District
Drass	Kargil
Kargil	Kargil
Leh	Leh

== Madhya Pradesh ==
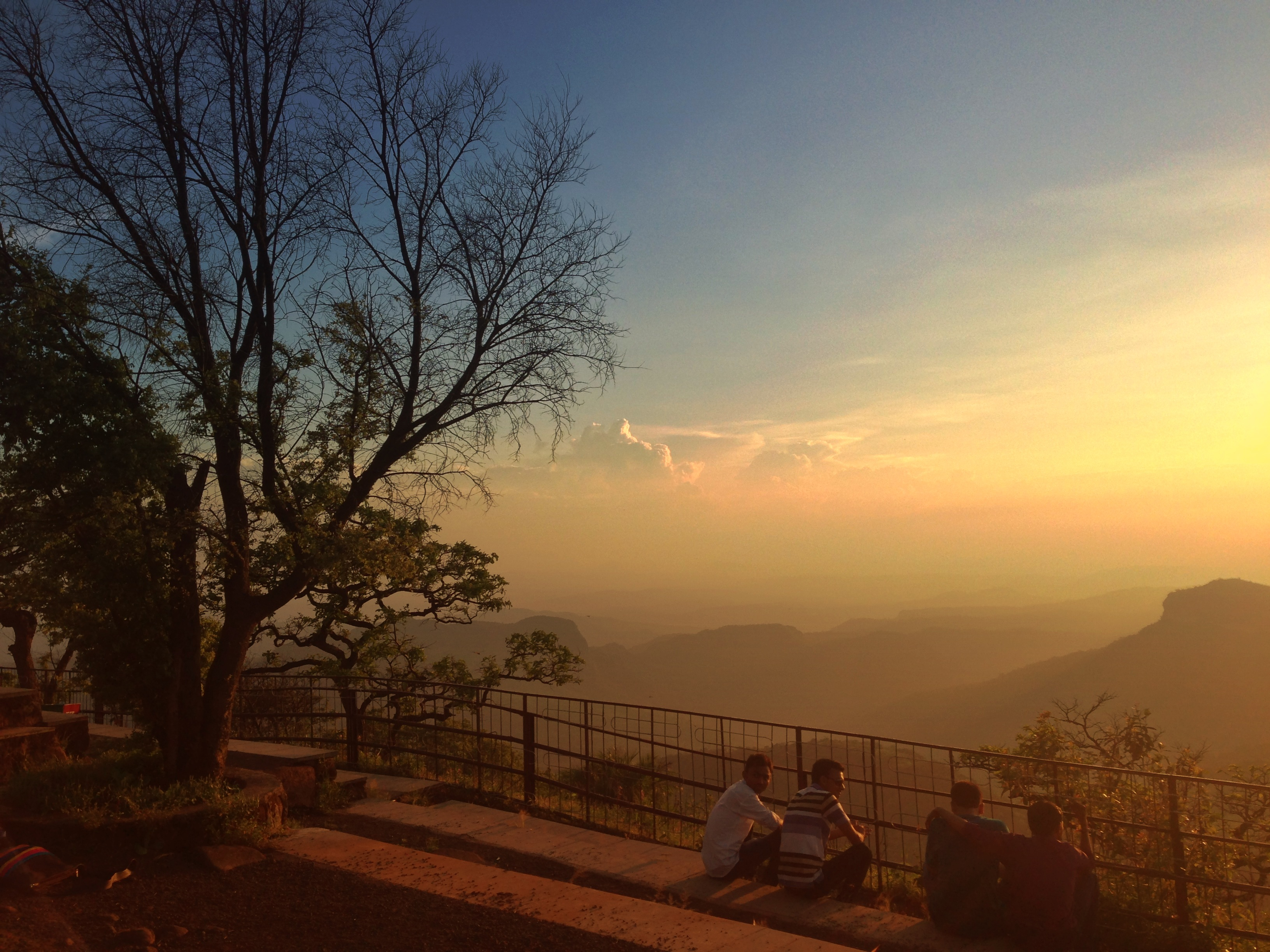
Panchmarhi

Place	District
Amarkantak	Anuppur
Pachmarhi	Narmadapuram
Shivpuri	Shivpuri
Tamia	Chhindwara
Kukru-Khamla	Betul

== Maharashtra ==
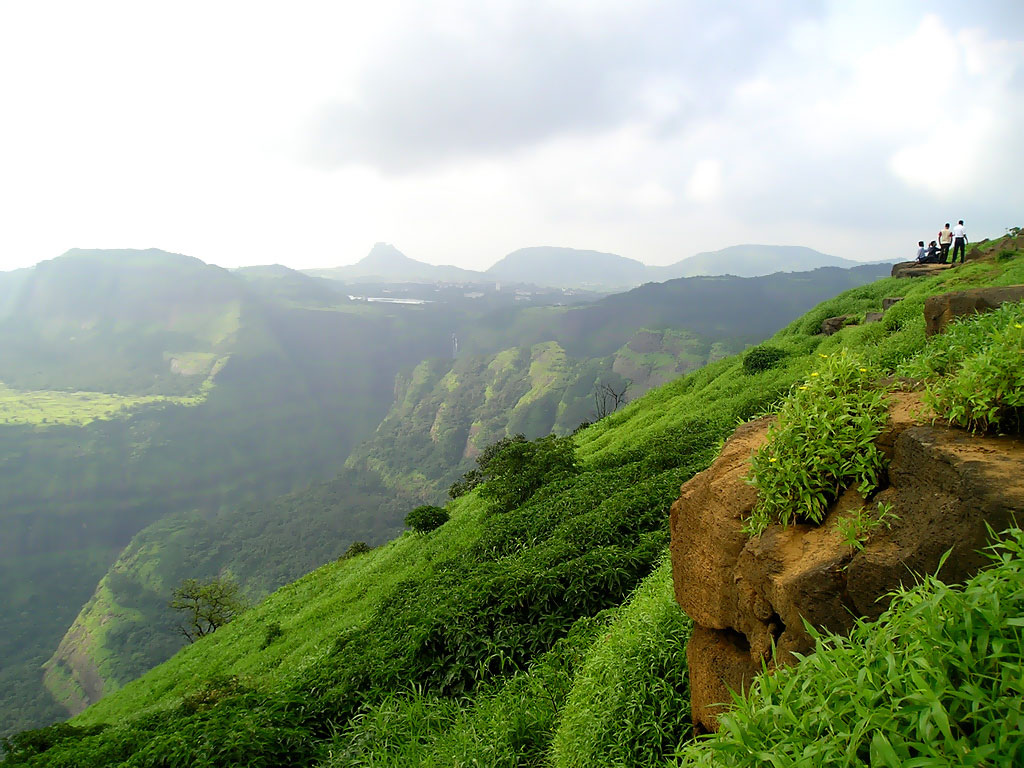
Lonavala, Maharashtra

Place	District
Antur	Aurangabad
Amba Ghat	Kolhapur
Ambenali hills	Satara and Raigad
Amboli	Sindhudurg
Amshi	Satara
Bambarde	Sindhudurg
Bhandardara	Ahmednagar
Bhildari	Aurangabad
Bhor ghats	Pune
Birmani	Satara
Chikhaldara	Amravati
Dahel	Nandurbar
Dandhari	Gondia
Darrekasa	Gondia
Deosur	Gadchiroli
Fukeri	Sindhudurg
Hatlot	Satara
Hirdoshi	Pune
Hemalkasa	Gadchiroli
Igatpuri	Nashik
Jamnya	Jalgaon
Jawhar	Palghar
Jimalgatta	Gadchiroli
Kaladgad	Ahmednagar
Kalavantin durg	Raigad
Karjat	Raigad
Karnala Fort	Raigad
Khandala	Pune
Kinjale	Ratnagiri
Kopela	Gadchiroli
Kuroshi	Satara
Lavasa	Pune
Lonavala	Pune
Mahabaleshwar	Satara
Malewada hills	Gondia and Gadchiroli
Malshej Ghat	Thane and Ahmednagar
Matheran	Raigad
Mhaismal	Aurangabad
Naneghat	Pune
Nawaja	Satara
Panchgani	Satara
Pofali	Ratnagiri
Pokur	Gadchiroli
Rampurwadi	Aurangabad
Ratangad	Ahmednagar
Saleghat	Nagpur
Shindi	Satara
Tamhini Ghat	Pune
Tangala	Chandrapur
Toranmal	Nandurbar
Thippa	Chandrapur
Uchat	Satara
Toranmal	Nandurbar
Asthamba	Nandurbar
Aamby Valley City	Pune

== Manipur ==
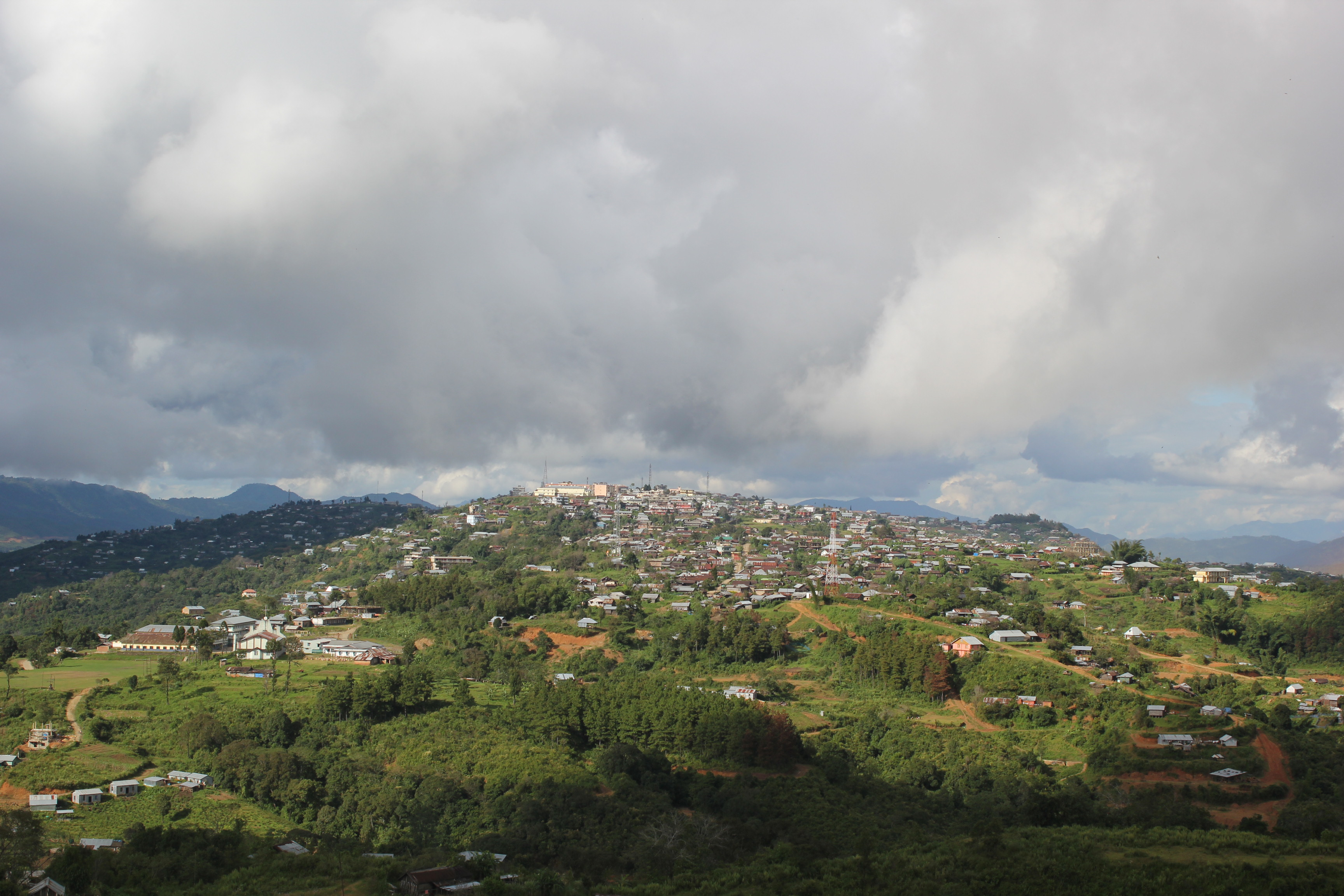
Ukhrul Hill Station

Place	District
Chandel	Chandel
Churachandpur	Churachandpur
Kaina	Thoubal
Kamjong	Kamjong
Kangpokpi	Kangpokpi
Noney	Noney
Pherzawl	Pherzawl
Sadar Hills	Kangpokpi
Senapati	Senapati
Tamenglong	Tamenglong
Tengnoupal	Tengnoupal
Ukhrul	Ukhrul

== Meghalaya ==
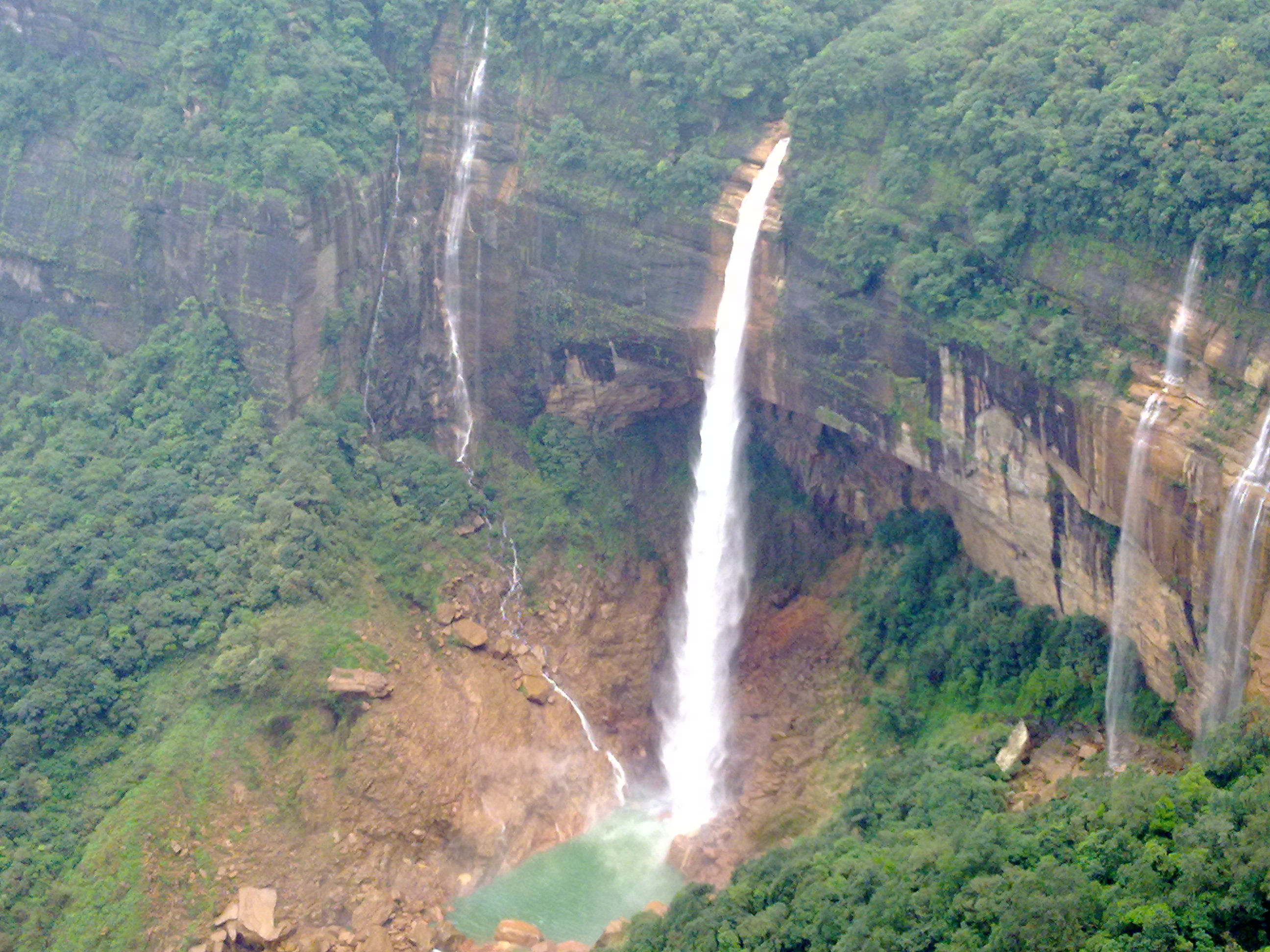
Nohkalikai Falls, Cherrapunjee, Meghalaya

Place	District
Cherrapunjee	East Khasi Hills
Dawki	West Jaintia Hills
Jowai	West Jaintia Hills
Mawlynnong	East Khasi Hills
Mawsynram	East Khasi Hills
Shillong	East Khasi Hills
Nongnah	West Khasi Hills

== Mizoram ==
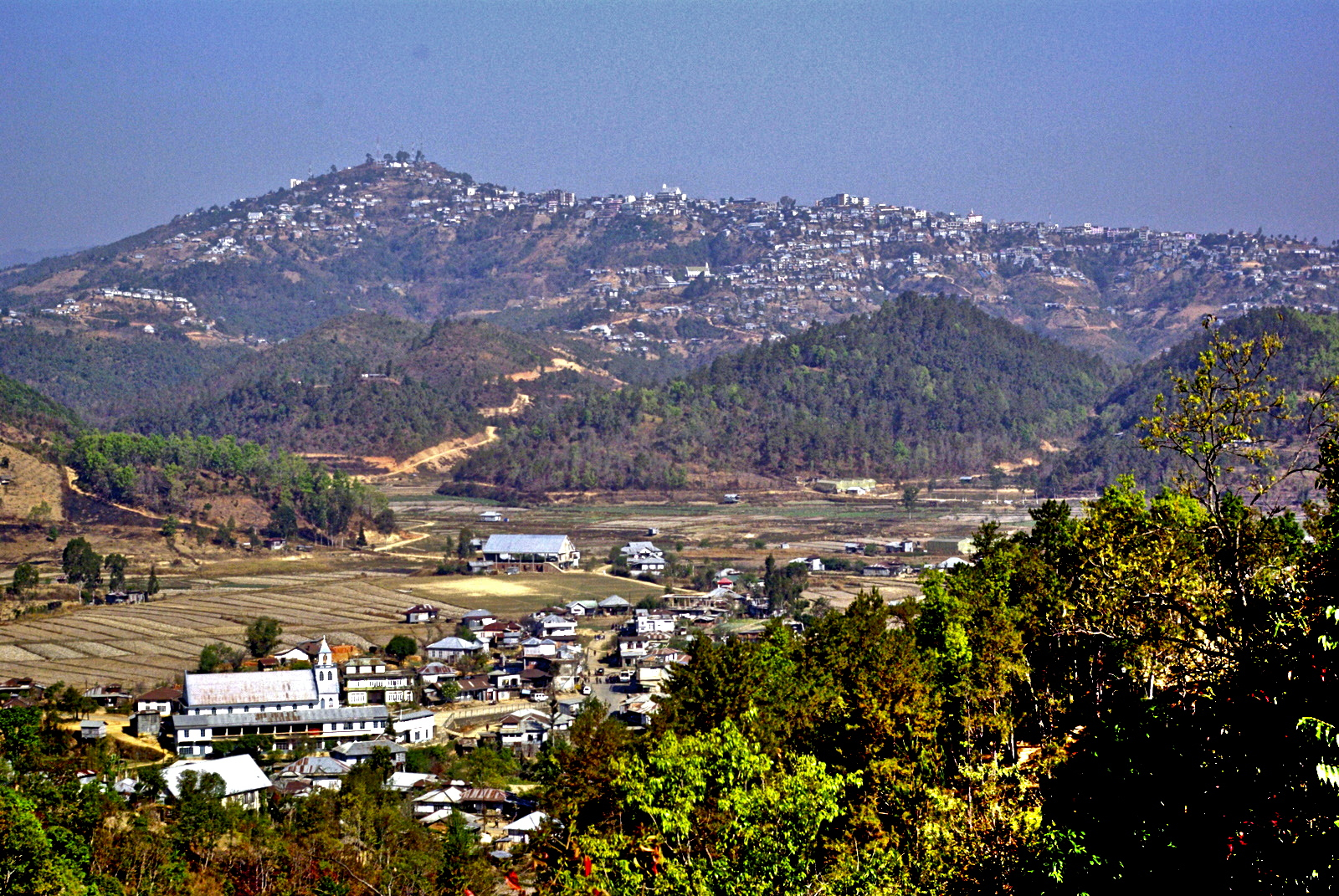
Champhai

Place	District
Champhai	Champhai
Hmuifang	Aizawl District
Lunglei	Lunglei
Mamit	Mamit
Reiek	Aizawl District

== Nagaland ==
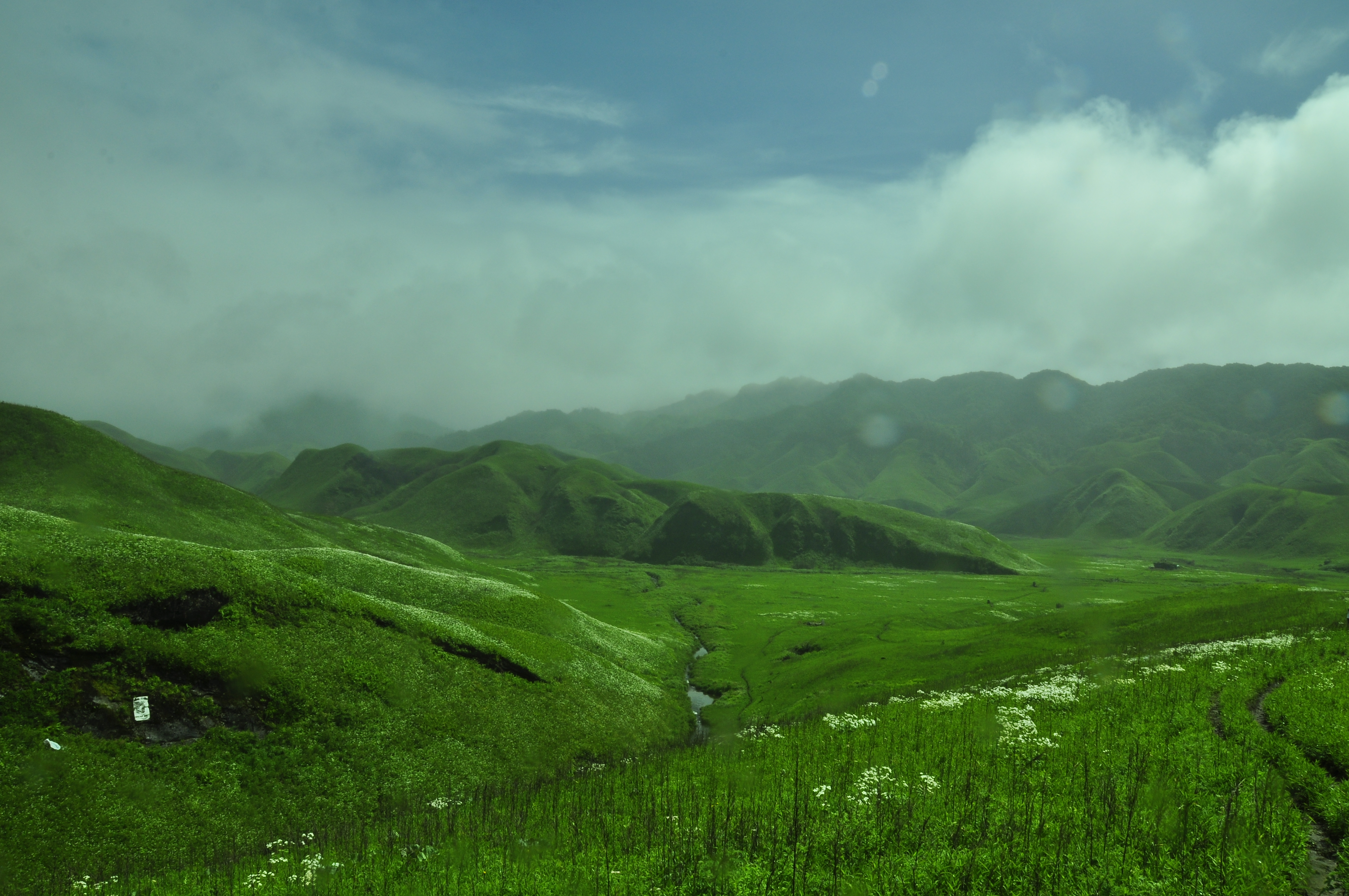
Dzuko Valley

Place	District
Dzüko Valley	Kohima
Kohima	Kohima
Pfütsero	Phek

== Odisha ==
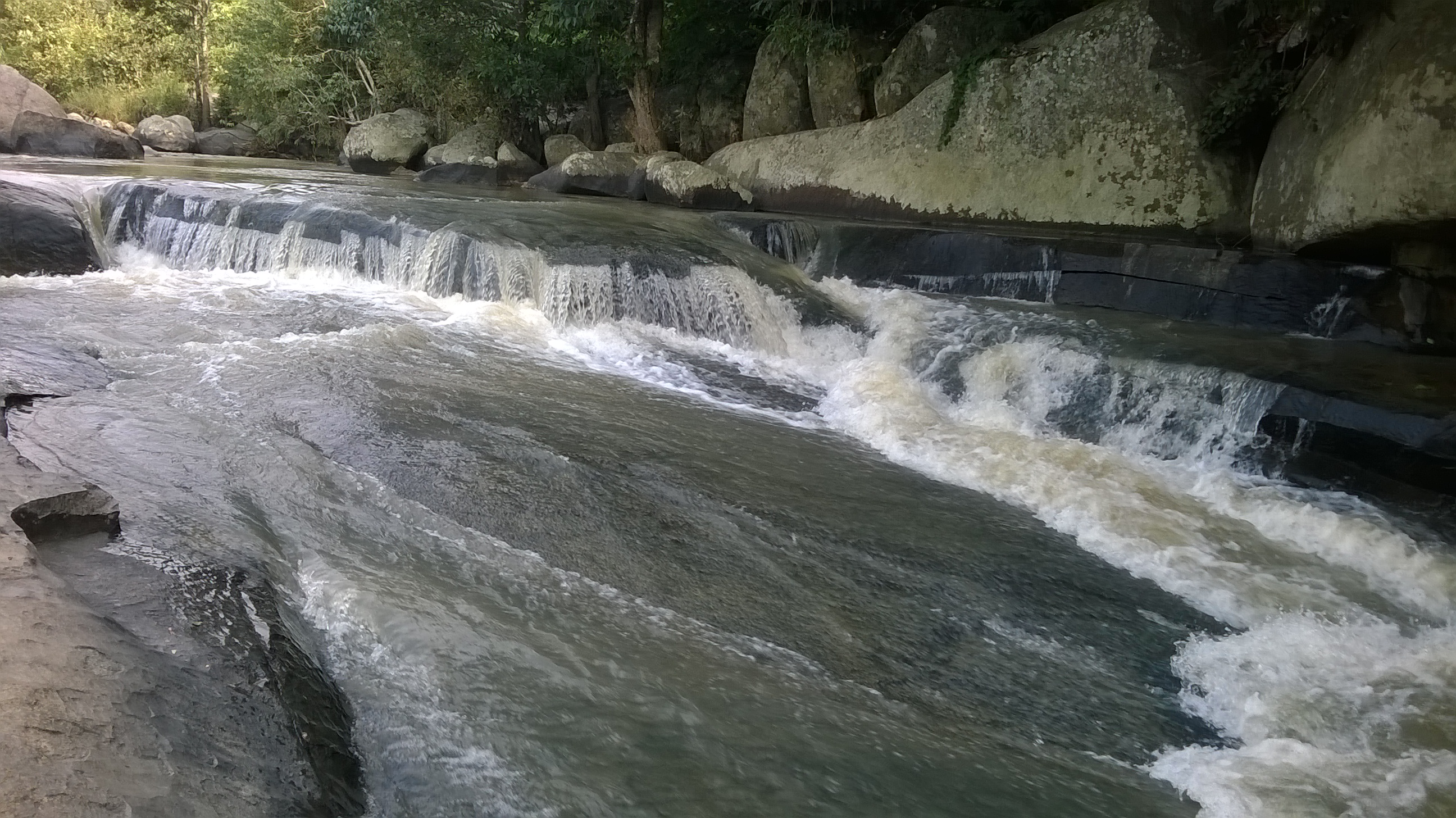
_Daringbadi

Place	District
Banigocha	Nayagarh
Bolagarh hills	Gajapati
Burakhat	Gajapati
Daringbadi	Kandhmal
Deomali	Koraput
Doganda	Malkangiri
Gopinathpur	Mayurbhanj
Gorumahisani hills	Mayurbhanj
Guma	Rayagada
Gurundi	Sundergarh
Jakham	Kalahandi
Jiranga	Gajapati
Jurundi	Mayurbhanj
Kalimela	Malkangiri
Khairput hills	Malkangiri
Khajurai	Ganjam
Khajurdihi Range	Sundergarh
Khallikote hills	Nayagarh
Khandapada hills	Nayagarh
Kiriburu	Keonjhar
Koraput	Koraput
Labangi	Angul
Lamberi	Rayagada
Lulung	Mayurbhanj
Mahulpatna	Kalahandi
Parshuram Kunda	Ganjam
Patel	Malkangiri
Phulabani	Kandhamal
Sukhuapata hills	Balasore
Tensa	Sundergarh
Mahendragiri	Gajapati
Malayagiri hills	Angul
Nalaghat	Gajapati
Narayanpatna	Koraput
Niyamagiri hills	Kalahandi and Rayagada
Nuagada	Gajapati
Pampasar	Angul
Sagada	Kalkandi
Seranga	Gajapati
Supali	Malkangiri
Tikarpada	Angul

== Rajasthan ==
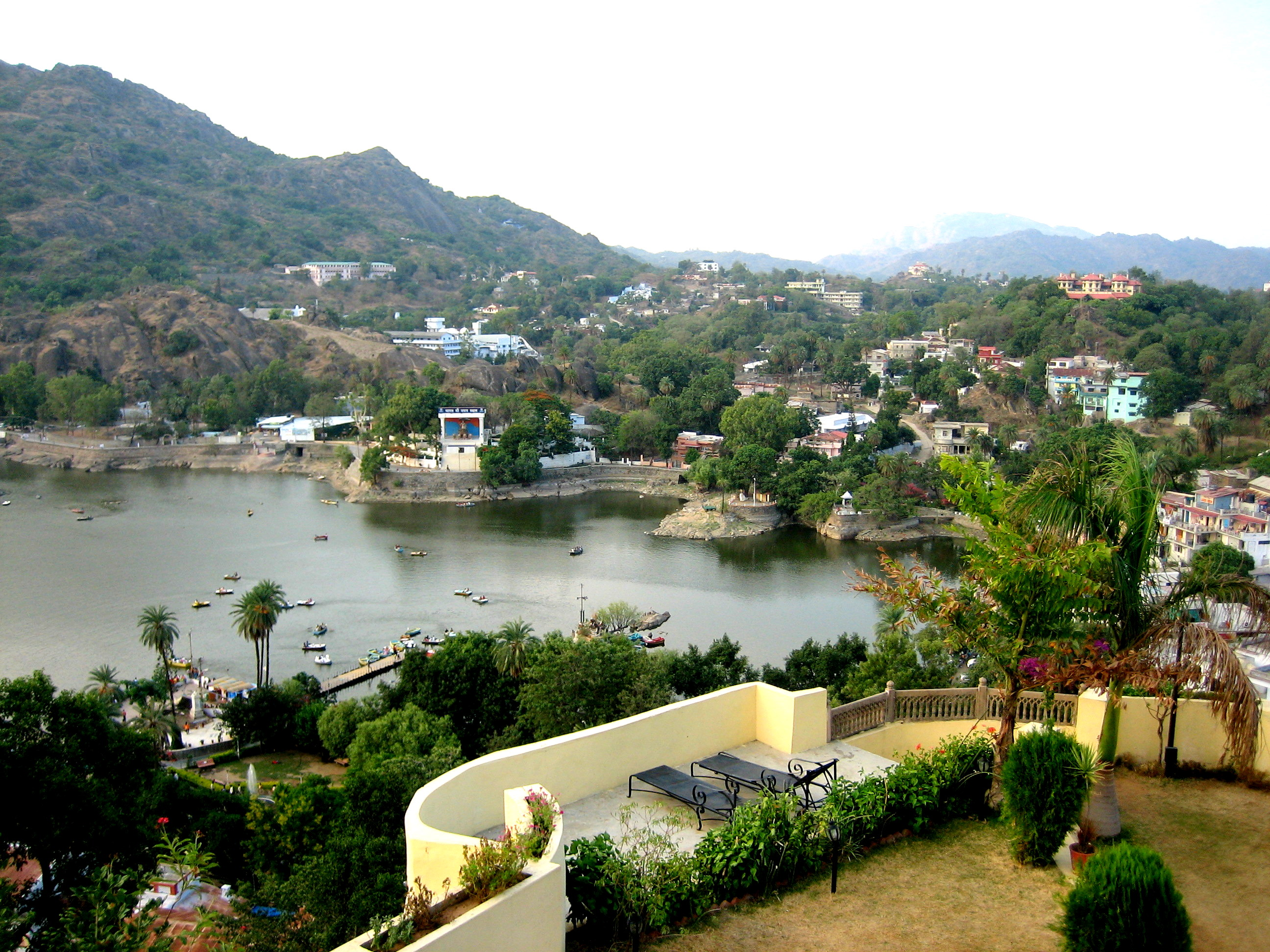
Mount Abu

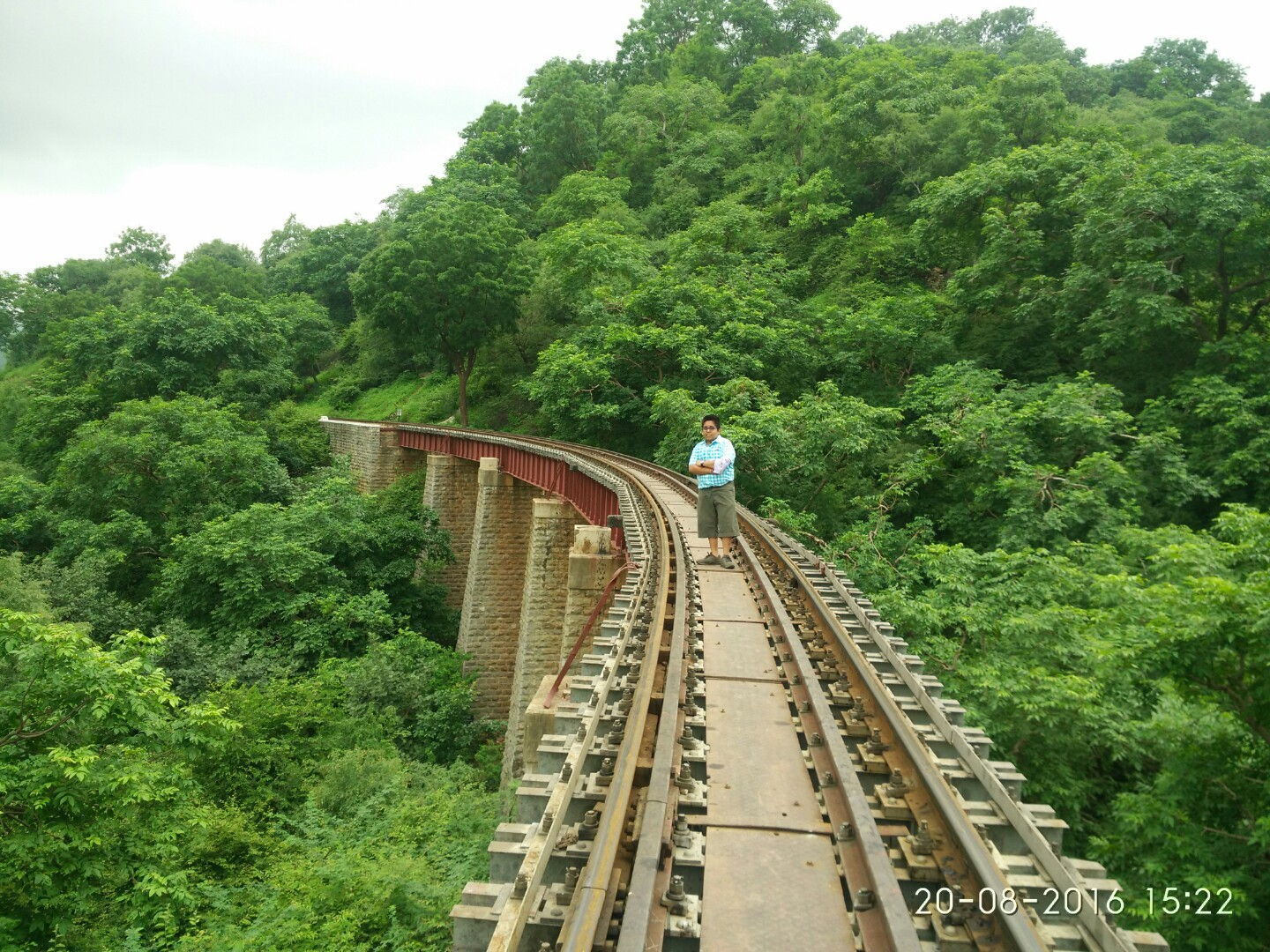
Railway tracks at goram ghat.

Place	District
Goram Ghat	Rajsamand and Pali
Akhi	Sirohi
Gurad	Udaipur
Hundla	Udaipur
Manasi	Udaipur
Mount Abu	Sirohi
Nidh	Baran
Seeta Mata hills	Chittorgarh and Banswara
Shahabad	Baran
Telni	Baran

== Sikkim ==
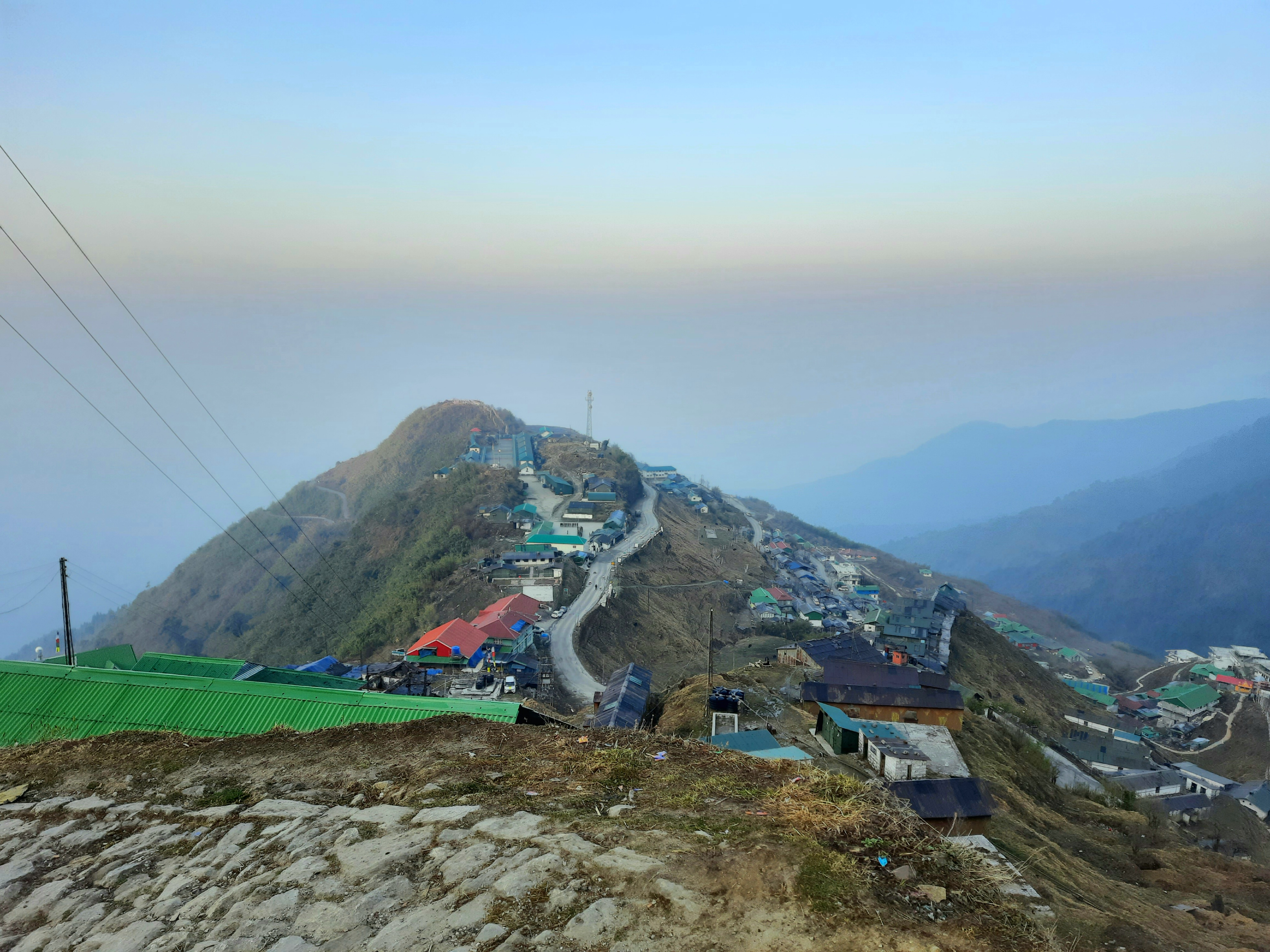
Dzuluk

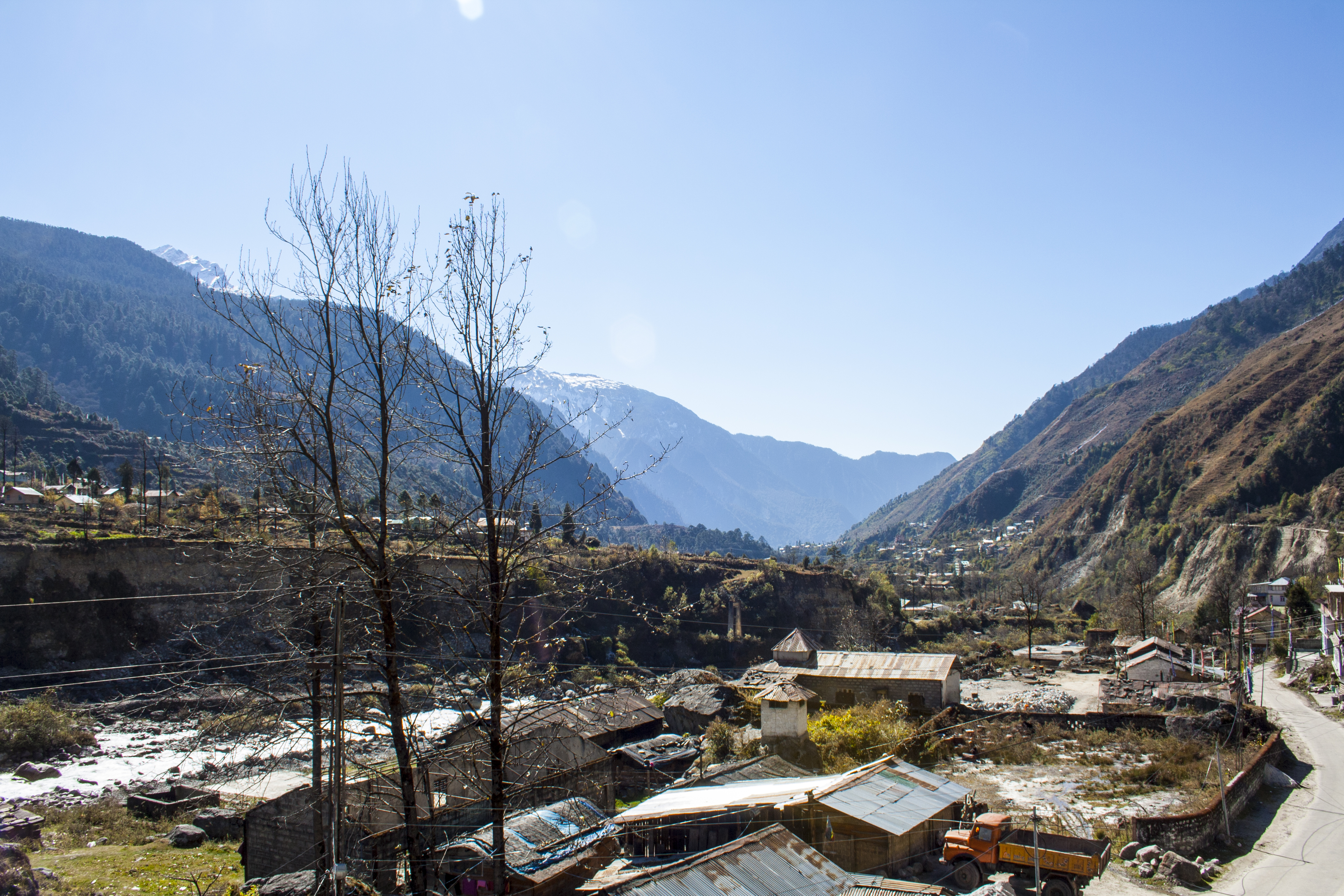
Lachung

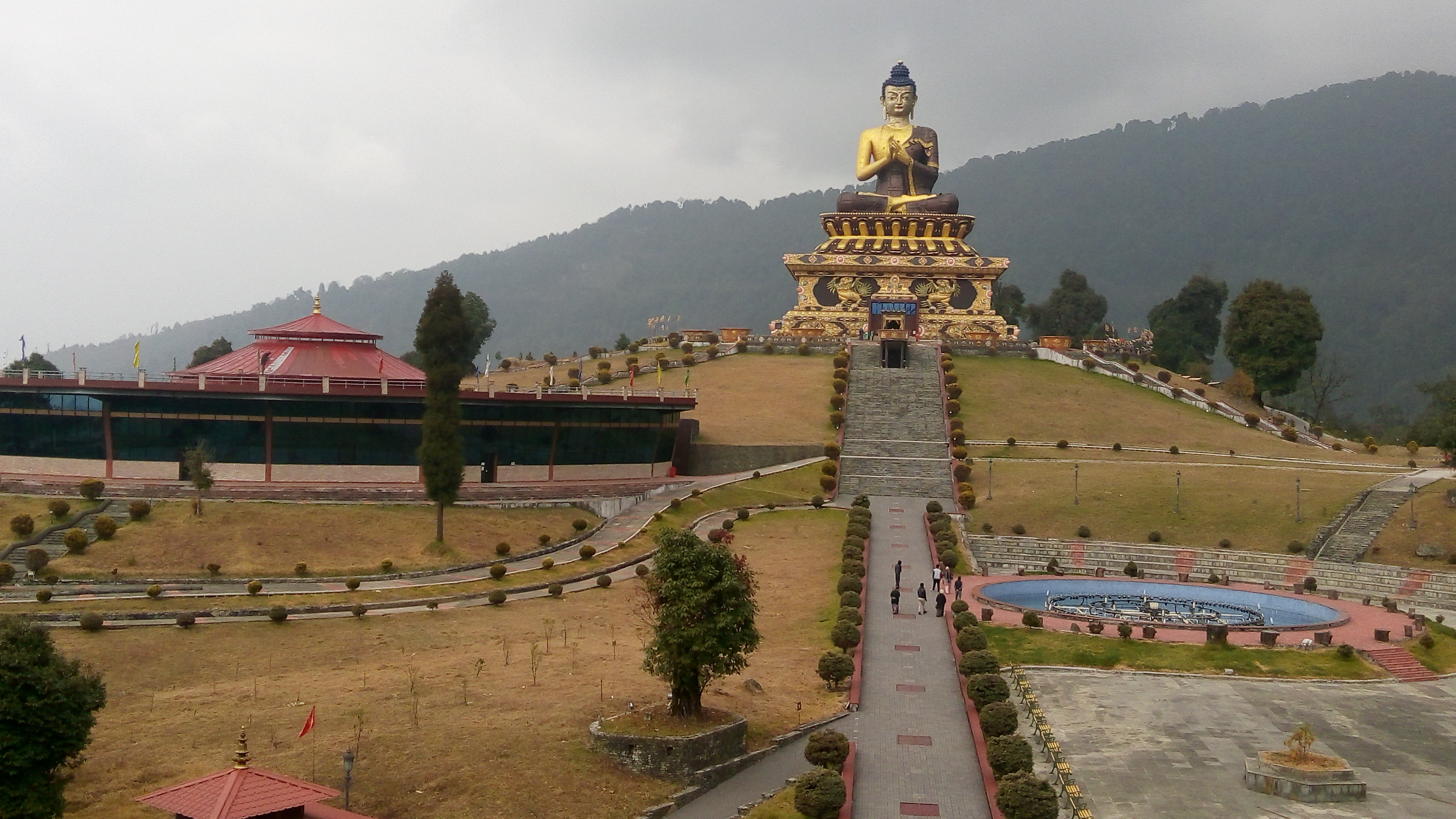
Namchi

Place	District
Dzuluk	Pakyong district
Gangtok	Gangtok district
Gyalshing	Gyalshing district
Lachen	Mangan district
Lachung	Mangan district
Namchi	Namchi district
Pakyong	Pakyong district
Pelling	Gyalshing district
Mangan	Mangan district
Rangpo	Pakyong district
Ravangla	Namchi district
Soreng	Soreng district
Aritar	Pakyong district
Yuksom	Gyalshing district
Gnathang	Pakyong district
Yumthang	Mangan district
Chungthang	Mangan district

== Tamil Nadu ==
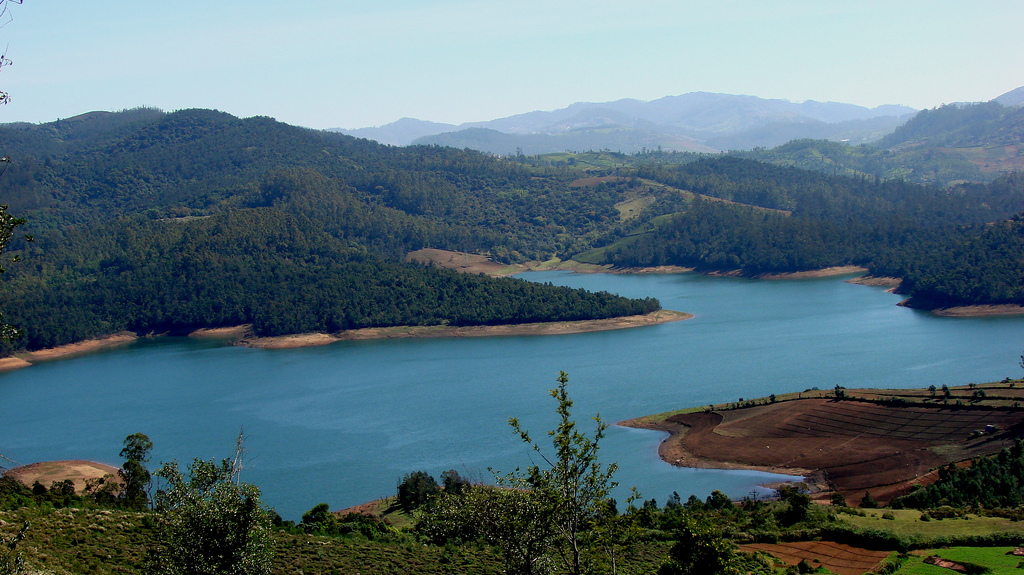
Emerald Lake, Ooty

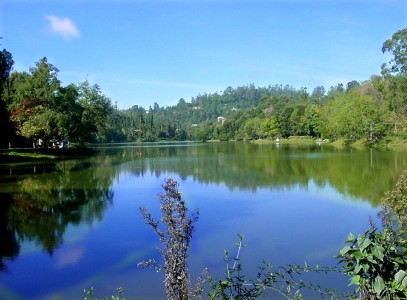
Kodaikanal

Place	District
Adukkam	Dindigul
Agastyamalai	Tirunelveli
Agamalai	Theni
Aginda peak	Nilgiris
Alancholai	Kannyakumari
Anaikatti	Coimbatore
Arangam	Salem
Aravatla	Vellore
Arasaradi hills	Theni
Attakatti	Coimbatore
Azhwar Malai	Kallakurichi
Bellikkal	Nilgiris
Bargur	Erode
Bikketti	Nilgiris
Bodimettu	Theni
Chinna Kallar	Coimbatore
Cinkona	Coimbatore
Chinnar	Tiruppur
Connoor	Nilgiris
Cumbummettu	Theni
Cherambadi	Nilgiris
Devala	Nilgiris
Devarshola	Nilgiris
Dottabetta	Nilgiris
Elamanam hills	Tiruchirappalli
Elavadi	Salem
Elumalai hills	Madhurai
Gangavalli hills	Salem and Tiruchirappalli
Germalam hills	Erode
Gudalur	Nilgris
Gundri	Erode
Gurumalai	Tiruppur
Guthiyalathur	Erode
Huligal	Nilgiris
Hullathy	Nilgiris
Ittarai	Erode
Janglapalli	Vellore
Palamathi hills	Vellore
Kanchanagiri (Mini Munnar)	Vellore-Ranipet Metro Area
Chenganatham hills	Vellore
Jarugumalai	Salem
Javadi Hills	Tiruvannamalai and Vellore
Kadambur	Erode
Kadayal	Kannyakumari
Mundanthurai	Tirunelveli
Kadanad	Nilgiris
Kadavur Valley	Karur
Kambalai	Dharmapuri
Kanamalai	Tiruvannamalai
Kanjamalai	Salem
Kariyalur	Kallakurichi
Karumutty	Tiruppur
Kavunji	Dindigul
Kinnakorai	Nilgiris
Kodanad	Nilgiris
Kolaribetta	Nilgiris
Koraiyar hills	Perambalur
Kottagudi	Theni
Kottaimalai	Tiruvannamalai
Kunnur	Salem
Manjampatti Valley	Tiruppur
Mannavanur	Dindigul
Mavallam	Erode
Mekkarai	Tirunelveli
Mettur hills	Salem and Dharmapuri
Mukurthi hills	Nilgiris
Mulli	Nilgiris
Muthukuzivayal	Kannyakumari
Kallar hills	Coimbatore
Ketti Valley	Nilgiris
Kalrayan Hills	Kallakurichi and Salem
Kannamangalam hills	Vellore
Kodayar hills	Kanyakumari
Keeriparai	Kannyakumari
Kilavarai	Dindigul
Kilkunda	Nilgris
Kodaikanal	Dindigul
Pandrimalai	Dindigul
Palliparai	Namakkal
Pathukani	Kannyakumari
Pattipadi	Salem
Periyur	Dindigul
Perumalmalai	Dindigul
Ponmani	Kannyakumari
Poombarai	Dindigul
Puthuputhur	Dindigul
Kolli Hills	Namakkal
Kolukkumalai	Theni
Kookal	Dindigul
Kotagiri	Nilgiris
Kurangani	Theni
Kumbur	Dindigul
Mancode	Kannyakumari
Manjolai	Tirunelveli
Highwavys	Theni
Masinagudi	Nilgiris
Manthal	Theni
Melagiri	Krishnagiri
Thali	Krishnagiri
Nagalur	Salem
Nagoor hills	Tiruchirappalli and Perambalur
Narthamalai	Pudukkottai
Navamalai	Coimbatore
Nayakkaneri hills	Vellore
Oosimalai	Erode
Ooty, Udhagamandalam	Nilgiris
O'valley	Nilgiris
Pechiparai	Kanyakumari
Pachaimalai Hills	Tiruchirappalli
Pandalur	Nilgiris
Perunchilambu	Kannyakumari
Poondi	Dindigul
Puliancholai hills	Tiruchirappalli
Piranmalai	Sivaganga
Ramakkalmedu	Theni
Rangampettai	Vellore
Reddiyur	Vellore
Hasanur	Erode
Serapattu	Kallakurichi
Sholur	Nilgiris
Sirukundra	Coimbatore
Sirumalai	Dindigul
Sitteri	Dharmapuri
Sittling hills	Dharmapuri
Sujalkarai	Erode
Sathuragiri hills	Madhurai
Thaishola	Nilgiris
Thirumoorthy hills	Tiruppur
Thirparappu	Kannyakumari
Thengumarahada	Erode
Topslip	Coimbatore
Valparai	Coimbatore
Wellington	Nilgiris
Yelagiri	Vellore
Yercaud	Salem
Vachathi	Dharmapuri
Valaikulam	Virudhunagar
Varusanad hills	Madhurai and Theni

== Telangana ==
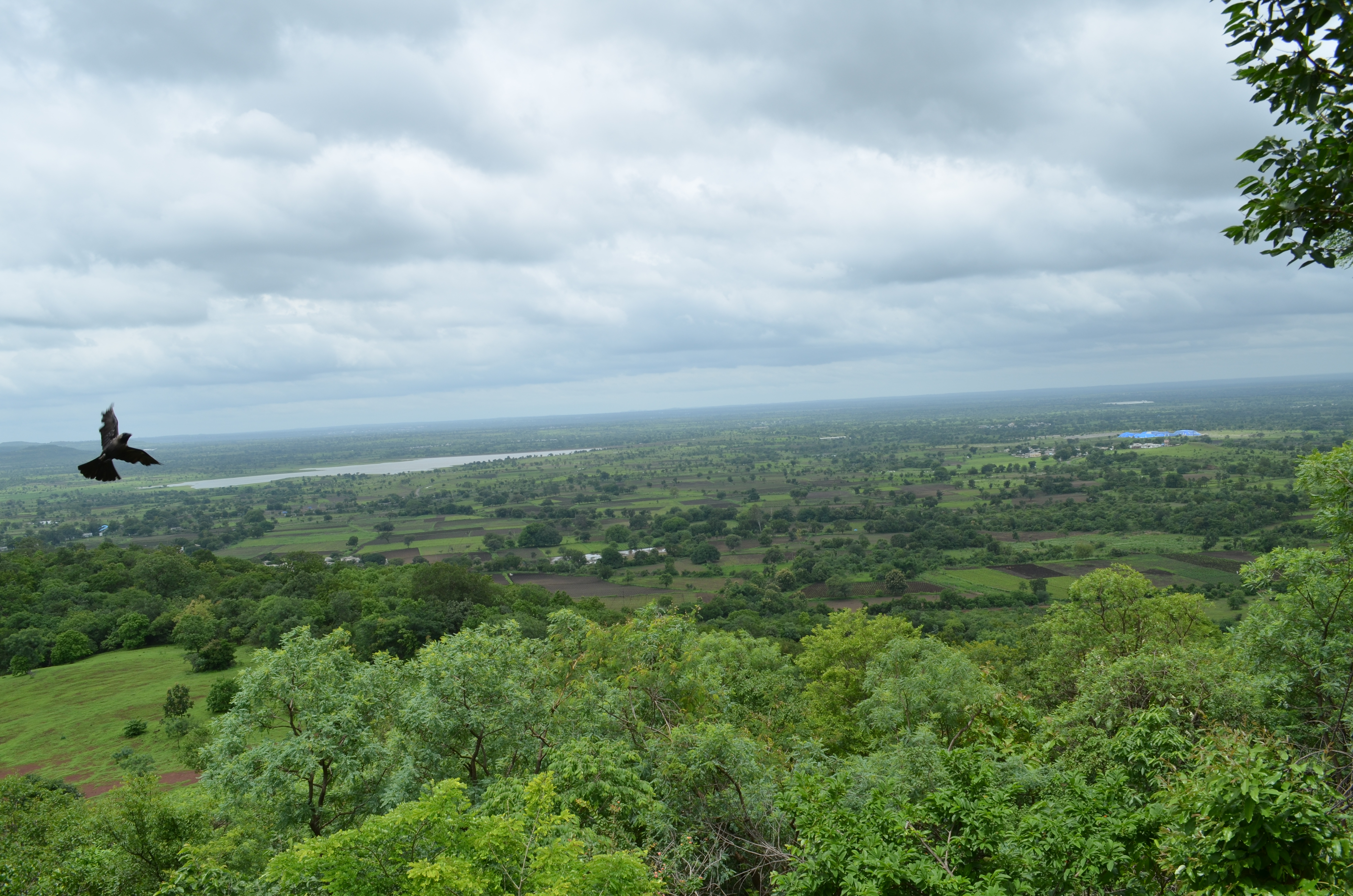
Ananthagiri Hills

Place	District
Ananthagiri Hills	Vikarabad

== Tripura ==
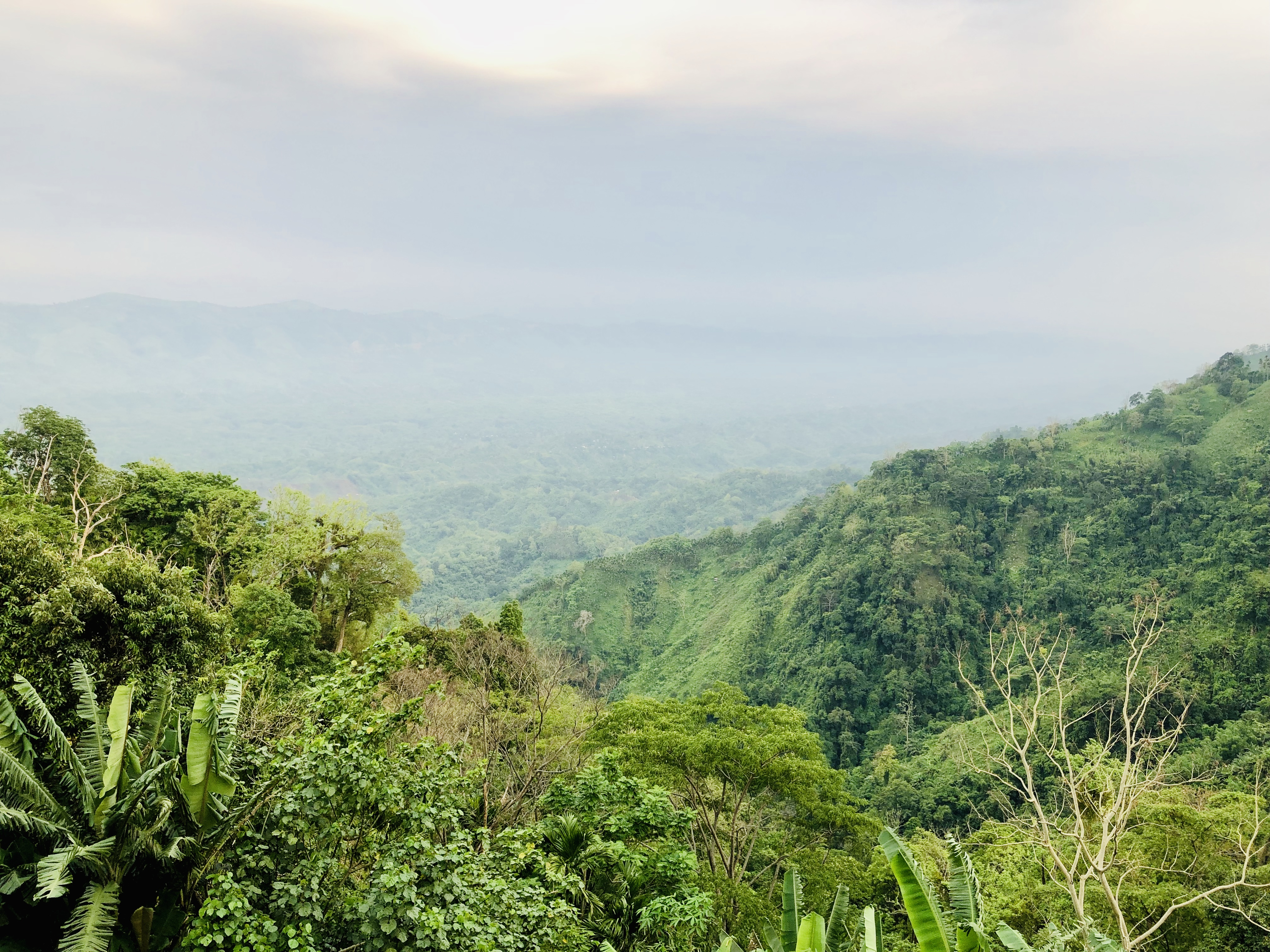
Jampui Hills

Place	District
Jampui Hills	North Tripura

== Uttarakhand ==
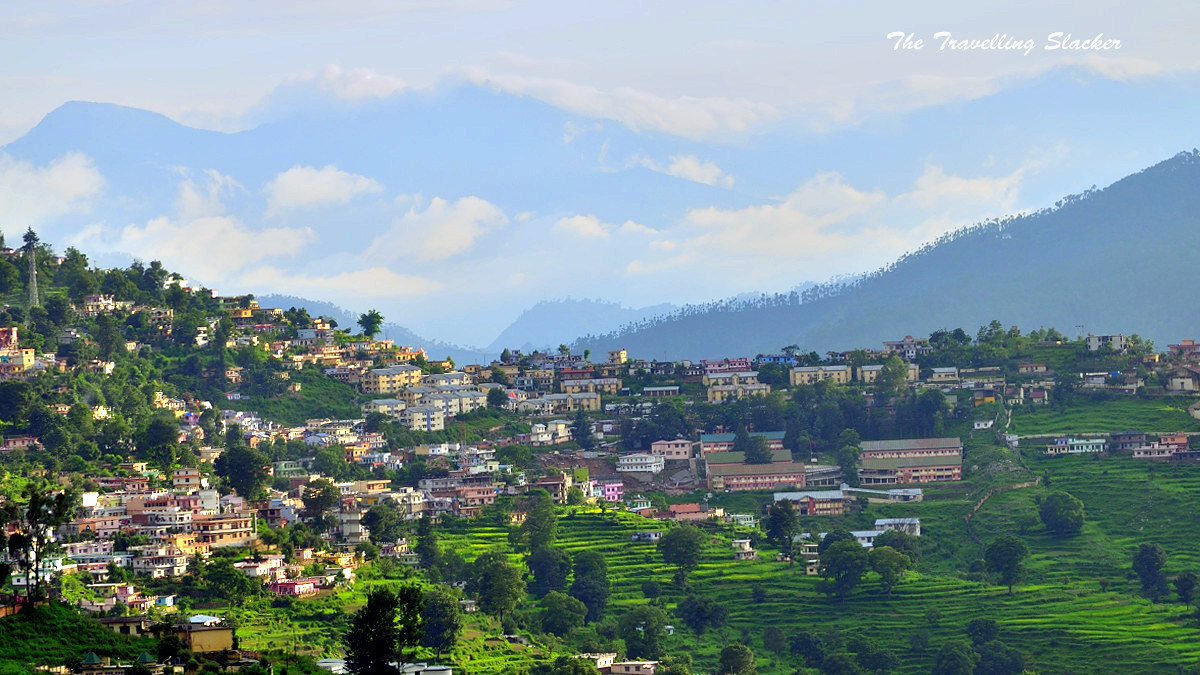
Almora

Place	District
Almora	Almora district
Auli	Chamoli district
Bedini Bugyal	Chamoli district
Berinag	Pithoragarh district
Bhimtal	Nainital district
Binsar	Almora district
Chakrata	Dehradun district
Chamba	Tehri Garhwal district
Chaukori	Pithoragarh district
Chopta	Rudraprayag district
Dayara Bugyal	Uttarkashi district
Dhanaulti	Tehri Garhwal district
Gidara Bugyal	Uttarkashi district
Harsil	Uttarkashi district
Jalna	Almora district
Joshimath	Chamoli district
Kanatal	Tehri Garhwal district
Kausani	Bageshwar district
Khirsu	Pauri Garhwal district
Khurpatal	Nainital district
Landour	Dehradun district
Lansdowne	Pauri Garhwal district
Lohaghat	Champawat district
Mukteshwar	Nainital district
Munsiyari	Pithoragarh district
Mussoorie	Dehradun district
Nainital	Nainital district
Naukuchiatal	Nainital district
New Tehri	Tehri Garhwal district
Pangot	Nainital district
Pauri	
Ramgarh	Nainital district
Ranikhet	Almora district
Sankri	Uttarkashi district

== West Bengal ==
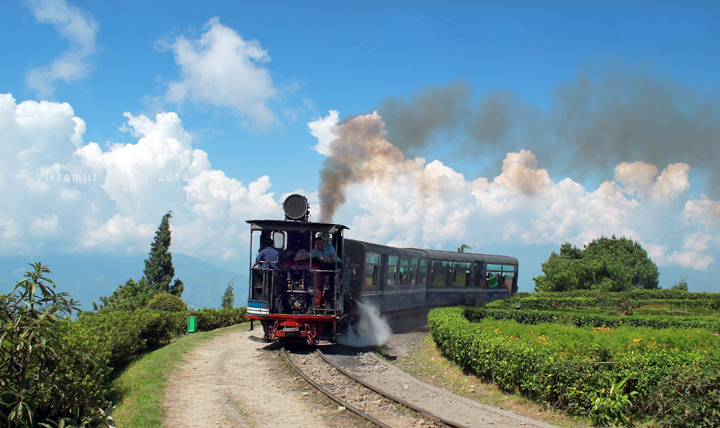
The 'Toy Train' in Darjeeling, West Bengal

Place	District
Algarah	Kalimpong
Ajodhya Hills	Purulia
Bagrakote	Kalimpong
Bandwan	Purulia
Belgeria	Purulia
Bindu	Kalimpong
Bijanbari	Darjeeling
Buxa	Alipurduar
Chaltha	Bankura
Chatakpur	Darjeeling
Darjeeling	Darjeeling
Dhotrey	Darjeeling
Dudhia	Jalpaiguri
Ghoom	Darjeeling
Gorkhey	Darjeeling
Gorubathan	Kalimpong
Gumbadara	Darjeeling
Hasimara	Alipurduar
Hatta	Darjeeling
Icche Gaon	Kalimpong
Jorpokhri	Darjeeling
Jayanti	Alipurduar
Jaigaon	Alipurduar
Jhalong	Kalimpong
Kalijhora	Kalimpong
Kalimpong	Kalimpong
Kankiabong	Darjeeling
Karmi	Darjeeling
Karru	Purulia
Kolakham	Kalimpong
Kolbong	Darjeeling
Kumargram	Alipurduar
Kunchia	Purulia
Kurseong	Darjeeling
Labha	Kalimpong
Lava	Kalimpong
Lamagaon	Darjeeling
Lepcha Jagat	Darjeeling
Lepchakha	Alipurduar
Lodhoma	Darjeeling
Loleygaon	Kalimpong
Makhnu	Bankura
Mane	Darjeeling
Mangpu	Darjeeling
Mirik	Darjeeling
Mulkarkha	Kalimpong
Pankhabari	Darjeeling
Pedong	Kalimpong
Phalut	Darjeeling
Pulbazar	Darjeeling
Rammam	Darjeeling
Ranibandh	Bankura
Relling	Darjeeling
Rimbick	Darjeeling
Rishyap	Kalimpong
Samsing	Darjeeling/Jalpaiguri
Sandakphu	Darjeeling/Ilam (Nepal)
Sevoke	Darjeeling
Sillery Gaon	Kalimpong
Sonada	Darjeeling
Soureni	Darjeeling
Takdah	Darjeeling
Tonglu	Darjeeling
Totopara	Alipurduar
Turturi	Alipurduar
Yakrabong	Darjeeling

== See also ==
- List of Indian states and union territories by highest point
- Skiing in India
