= Gundri =

Village in India

Gundri is a village in the Satyamangalam taluk in the Erode district of Tamil Nadu, India. It is located 59 kilometres (37 mi) west of Erode, 28 kilometres (17 mi) from Satyamangalam and 405 kilometres (252 mi) from Chennai, the capital of Tamil Nadu.

Gundri is neighboured by Andiyur taluk to the east and Gopichettipalaiyam taluk and Nambiyur taluk to the south. It is subdivided into Upper Gundri, Lower Gundri and Kovilur.

During the British period, a Roman Catholic convent, primary school and hospital were built by the Franciscan Missionary Movement, all of which exist today to serve the surrounding communities.

The main language of Gundri is Tamil.

Transportation is available by bus from Sathyamangalam.
