= Bellikkal =

Village in Tamil Nadu, India

Bellikkal is a village to the south of the Sigur Plateau in Tamil Nadu. Located at an altitude of 5,500 ft (1,700 m), it is in the Nilgiris of the Western Ghats of Tamil Nadu. Bellikkal is located about 245 km from Bangalore and 15 km from Ootacamund.
