= Kinnakorai =

Kinnakorai Kinnakara
- village
- Location in Tamil Nadu, India
- Coordinates: 11°13′0″N 76°40′0″E
- Country: India
- State: Tamil Nadu
- Time zone: UTC+5:30 (IST)
- PIN: 643219

Kinnakorai is a village in Kundha Taluk, Nilgiris District, Tamil Nadu.

Previously, coffee was grown, but now the main income source is tea cultivation.
