= Mancode =

Mancode Mancodu
- village
- Location in Kerala, India Mancode (India)
- Coordinates: 9°7′20″N 76°54′0″E
- Country: India
- State: Kerala
- District: Kollam

Population (2011)
  - Total: 24,988

Languages
  - Official: Malayalam, English
- Time zone: UTC+5:30 (IST)
- Vehicle registration: KL-

Mancode is a village in the Kollam district in the state of Kerala, India.

== Demographics ==
As of 2011 India census, Mancode had a population of 24,988 with 11,574 males and 13,414 females.
