= Vazhichal =

- village
- Location in Kerala, India Vazhichal (India)
- Coordinates: 8.513119°N 77.167866°E
- Country: India
- State: Kerala
- District: Thiruvananthapuram

Government
  - Body: Gram panchayat

Population (2011)
  - Total: 10,353

Languages
  - Official: Malayalam, English
- Time zone: UTC+5:30 (IST)
- PIN: 6XXXXX
- Vehicle registration: KL-

Vazhichal is a village in Thiruvananthapuram district in the state of Kerala, India.

== Demographics ==
As of 2011 India census, Vazhichal had a population of 10353 with 5036 males and 5317 females.
