= Karrur =

Karrur كرور
- Village
- Location within Iran
- Coordinates: 28°41′42″N 58°16′16″E
- Country: Iran
- Province: Kerman
- County: Anbarabad
- Bakhsh: Jebalbarez-e Jonubi
- Rural District: Garmsar

Population (2006)
  - Total: 54
- Time zone: UTC+3:30 (IRST)
  - Summer (DST): UTC+4:30 (IRDT)

Karrur (Persian: كرور, also Romanized as Karrūr; also known as Karrū) is a village in Garmsar Rural District, Jebalbarez-e Jonubi District, Anbarabad County, Kerman Province, Iran. At the 2006 census, its population was 54, in 14 families.
