= Mothugudem =

Mothugudem is a village in the Donkarai Road In Polavaram district of the Indian state of Andhra Pradesh. It is located in Chinturu mandal.

== Demographics ==
As of 2011 Census of India, Mothugudem had a population of 3,686. The total population consists of 1,854 males and 1,832 females, with a sex ratio of 988 females per 1000 males. 389 children are in the age group of 0–6 years, with a sex ratio of 1097 girls per 1047 boys. The average literacy rate stands at 66.36% with 1,237 literates.

== Transport ==
TSRTC runs buses from Bhadrachalam. The nearby railway station is Bhadrachalam.
