= Kadayal =

- town
- Location in Tamil Nadu, India
- Coordinates: 8°26′27″N 77°15′34″E
- Country: India
- State: Tamil Nadu
- District: Kanyakumari

Population (2011)
  - Total: 19,226

Languages
  - Official: Tamil
- Time zone: UTC+5:30 (IST)

Kadayal is a town in Kanniyakumari district in the Indian state of Tamil Nadu.

== Demographics ==
As of 2001 India census, Kadayal had a population of 19,226. Males constitute 49% of the population and females 51%. Kadayal has an average literacy rate of 77%, higher than the national average of 59.5%: male literacy is 80%, and female literacy is 74%. In Kadayal, 13% of the population is under 6 years of age.
