= Tosh, Himachal Pradesh =

Village in Himachal Pradesh, India

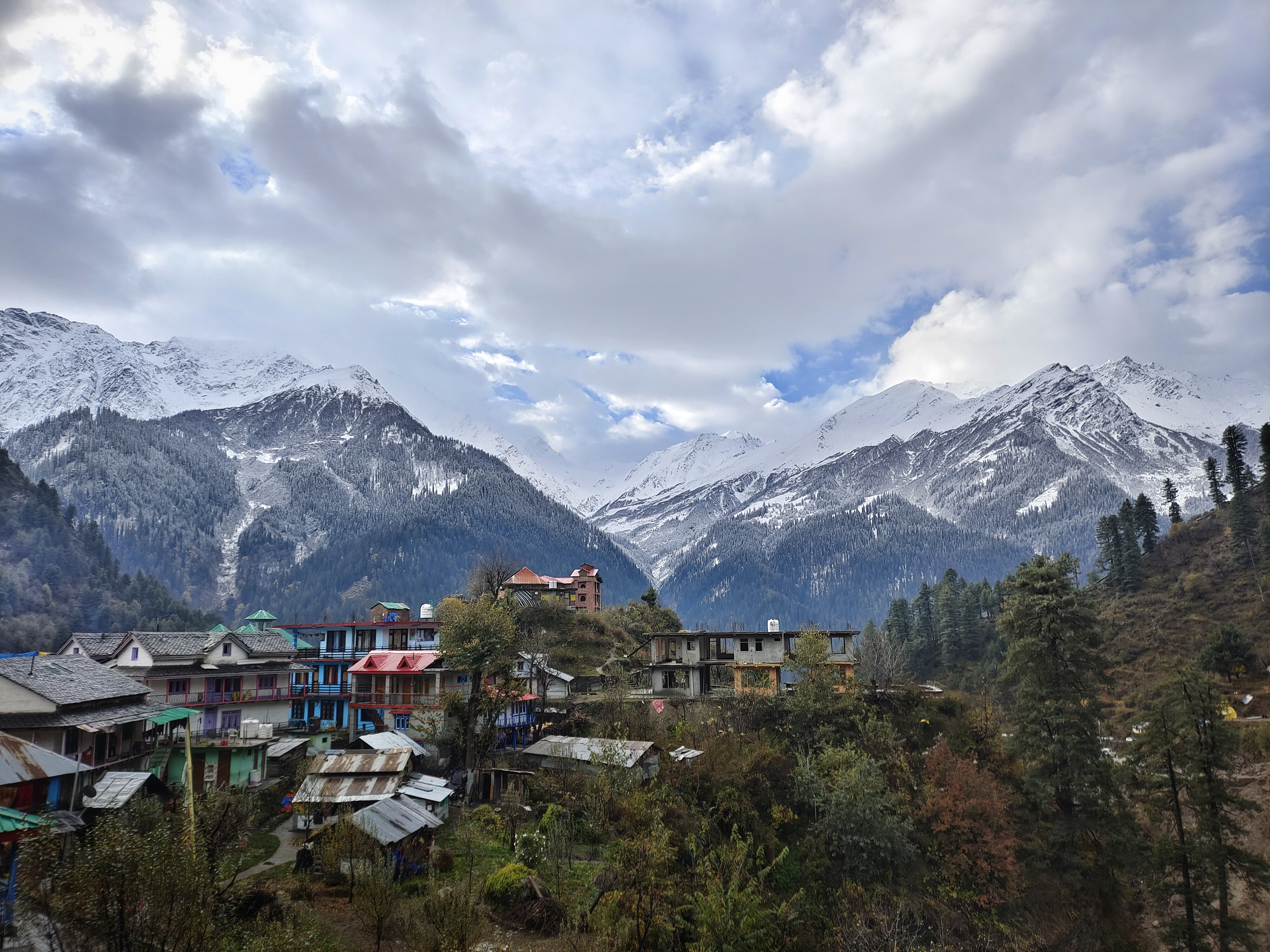
The village of Tosh in Himachal Pradesh

Tosh village is in Himachal Pradesh state of India. It is located at about 2,400 metres (7,900 ft) in elevation on a mountain slope on the right bank of the Parvati River in the Parvati Valley, surrounded by mountains (TOSH is the last village). The main occupation of the people in Parvati valley is Tourism. Apple orchards are also a big source of income for the local people. Wooden houses in the village are excellent example of architecture of Mountain people. Tosh is less expensive than its neighbour town Kasol. The guest houses and the hotels are available both at the entrance and far end of the village. Alongside the village is a right-bank tributary of the Parvati River. The Parvati River begins at the Mantalai Glacier within the Parvati Valley. The peaks surrounding the glacier include Papasura, White Sail, Angduri, Pinnacle, and Devachan. Tosh village is reached by bus from Kullu to Barshaini via Kasol and Manikaran and then a one-hour hike. It is described as a "traditional village turned hippie colony".

== Flora and fauna ==
In the meadows and valleys around Tosh are Himalayan blue poppies, irises, marsh marigolds, primulas, buttercups, and Himalayan balsam flowers. Birds in the area include lamagiers, bull finches, rose finches, Himalayan griffons, white-capped water starts, and brown dippers. Himalayan brown and black bears are occasionally seen.

== Gallery ==
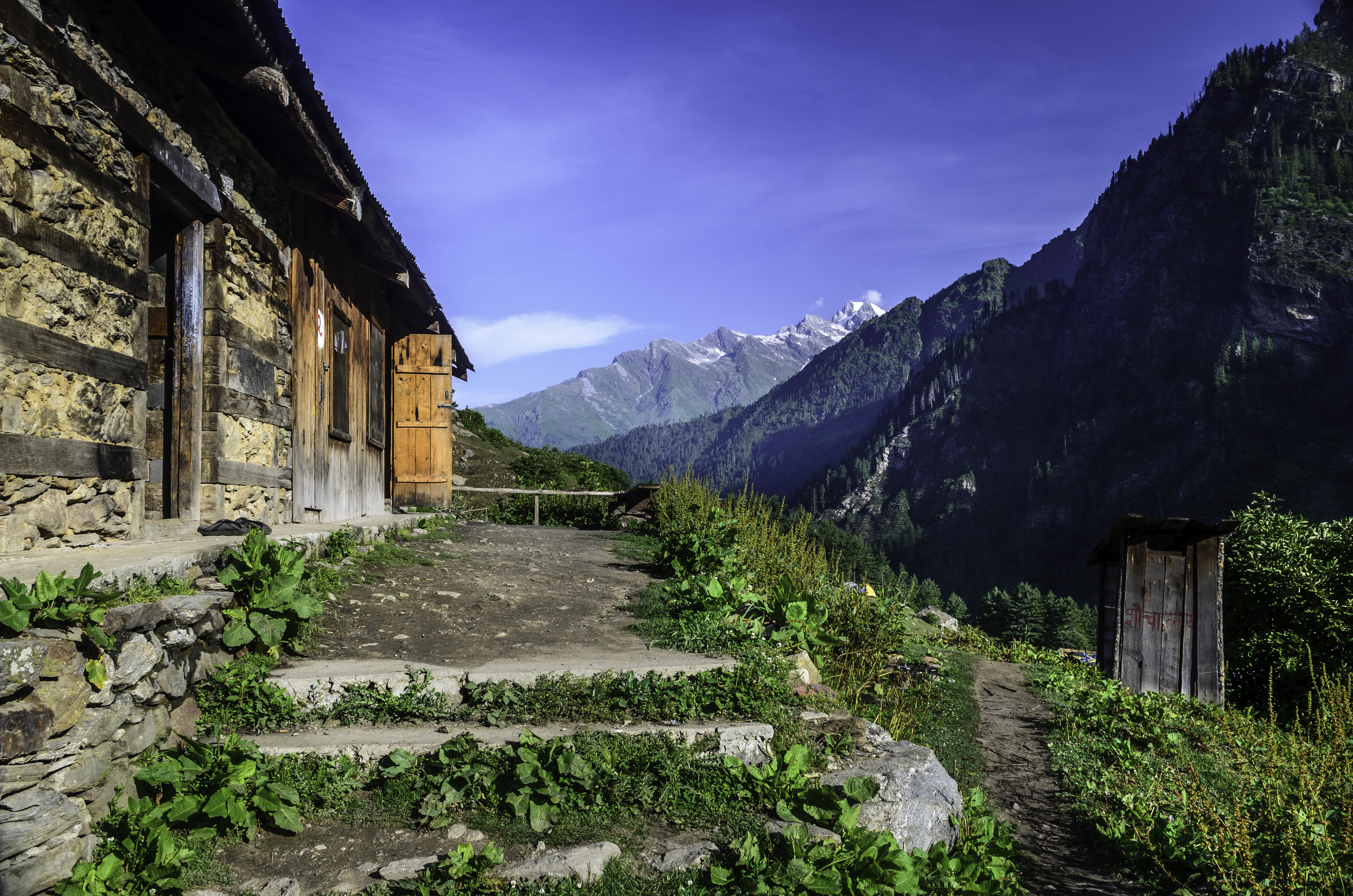
Tosh glacier

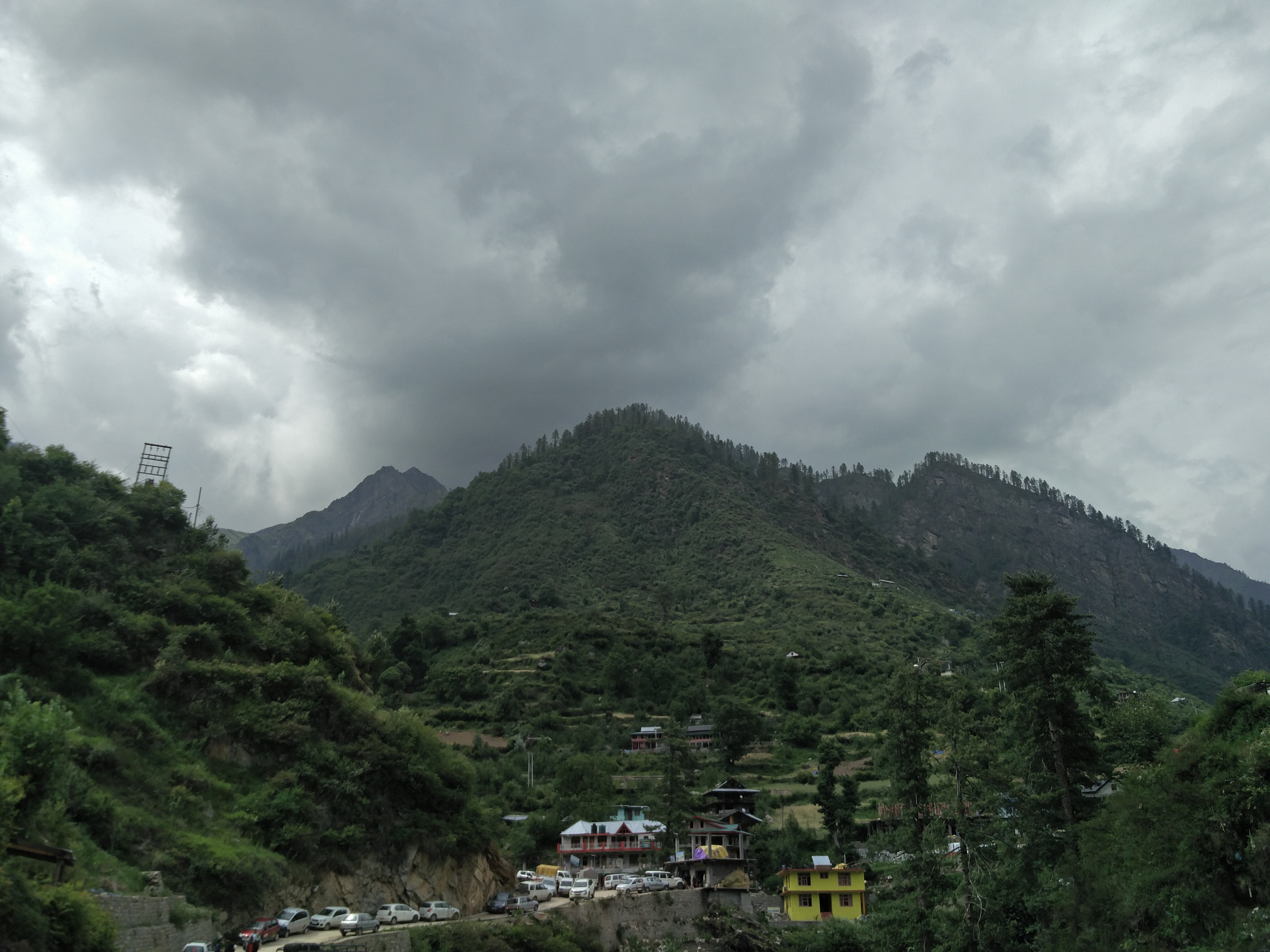
View from Tosh

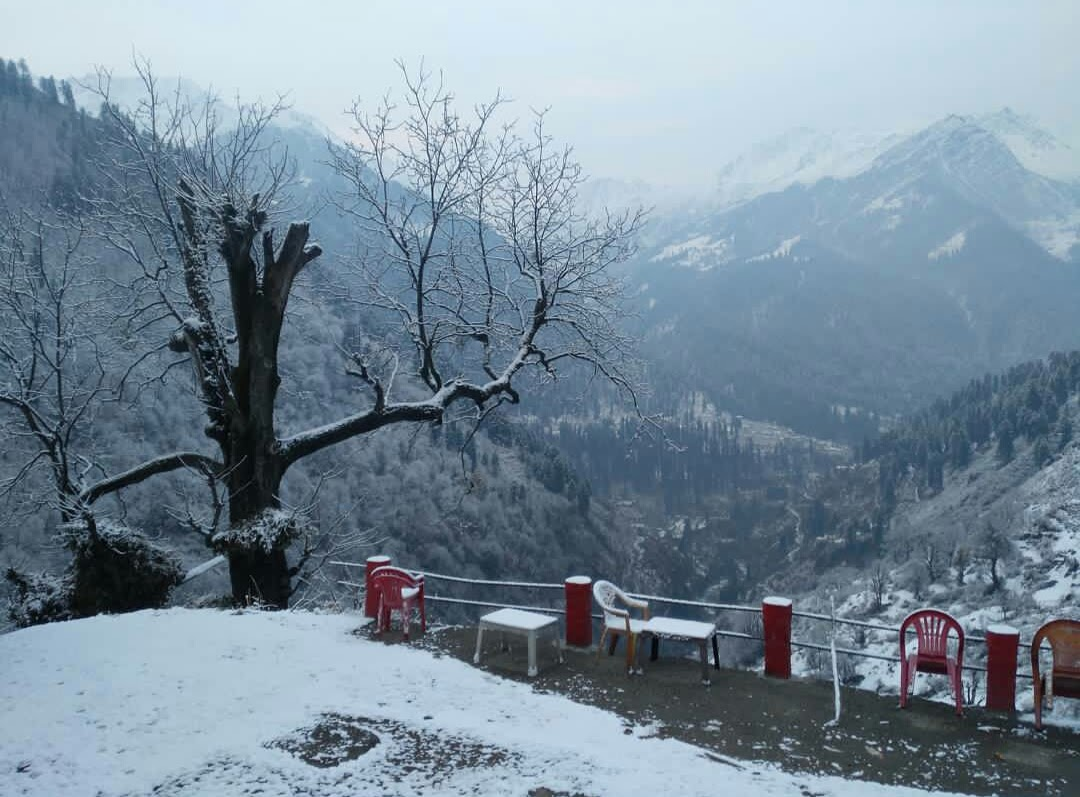

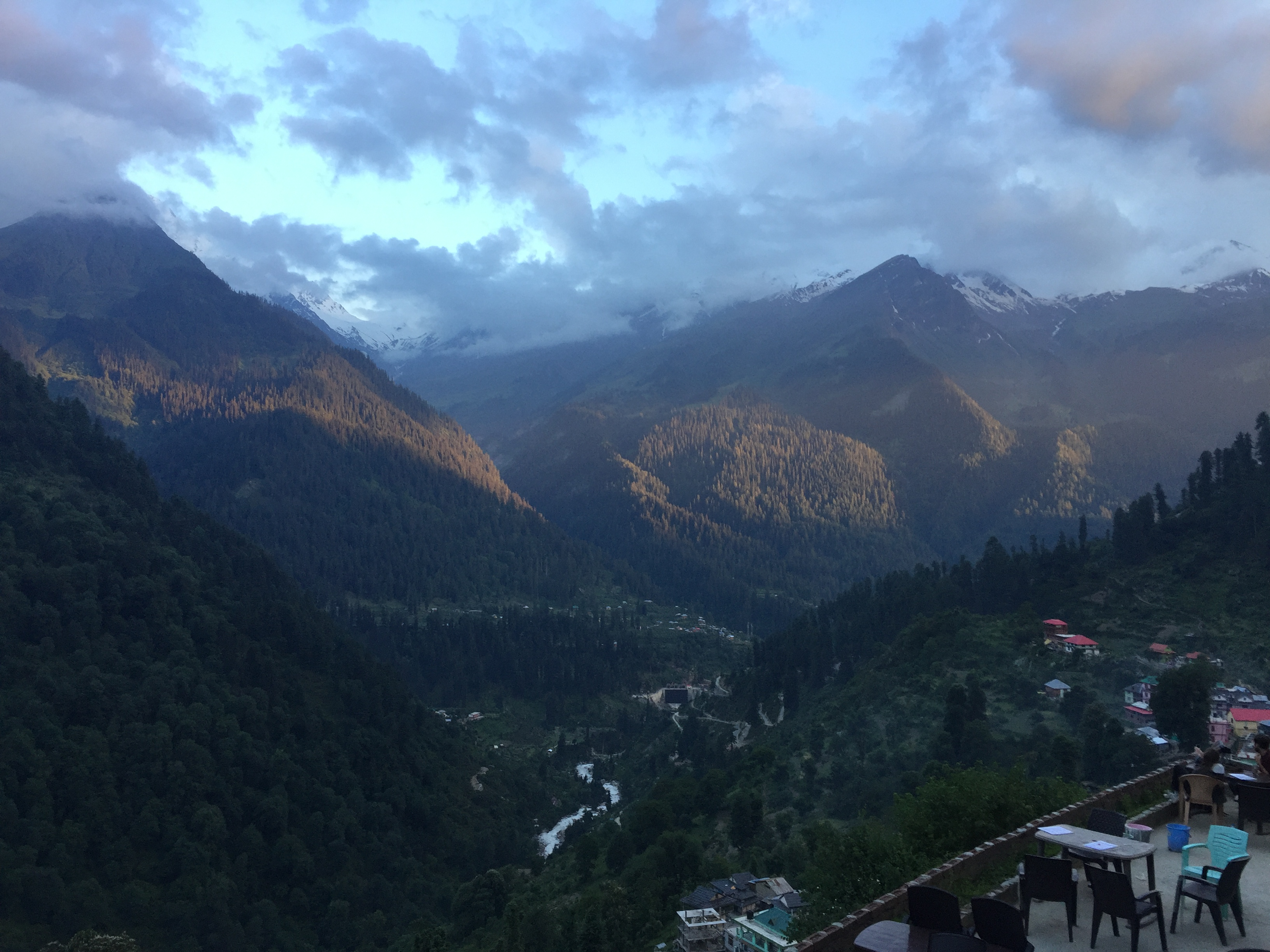

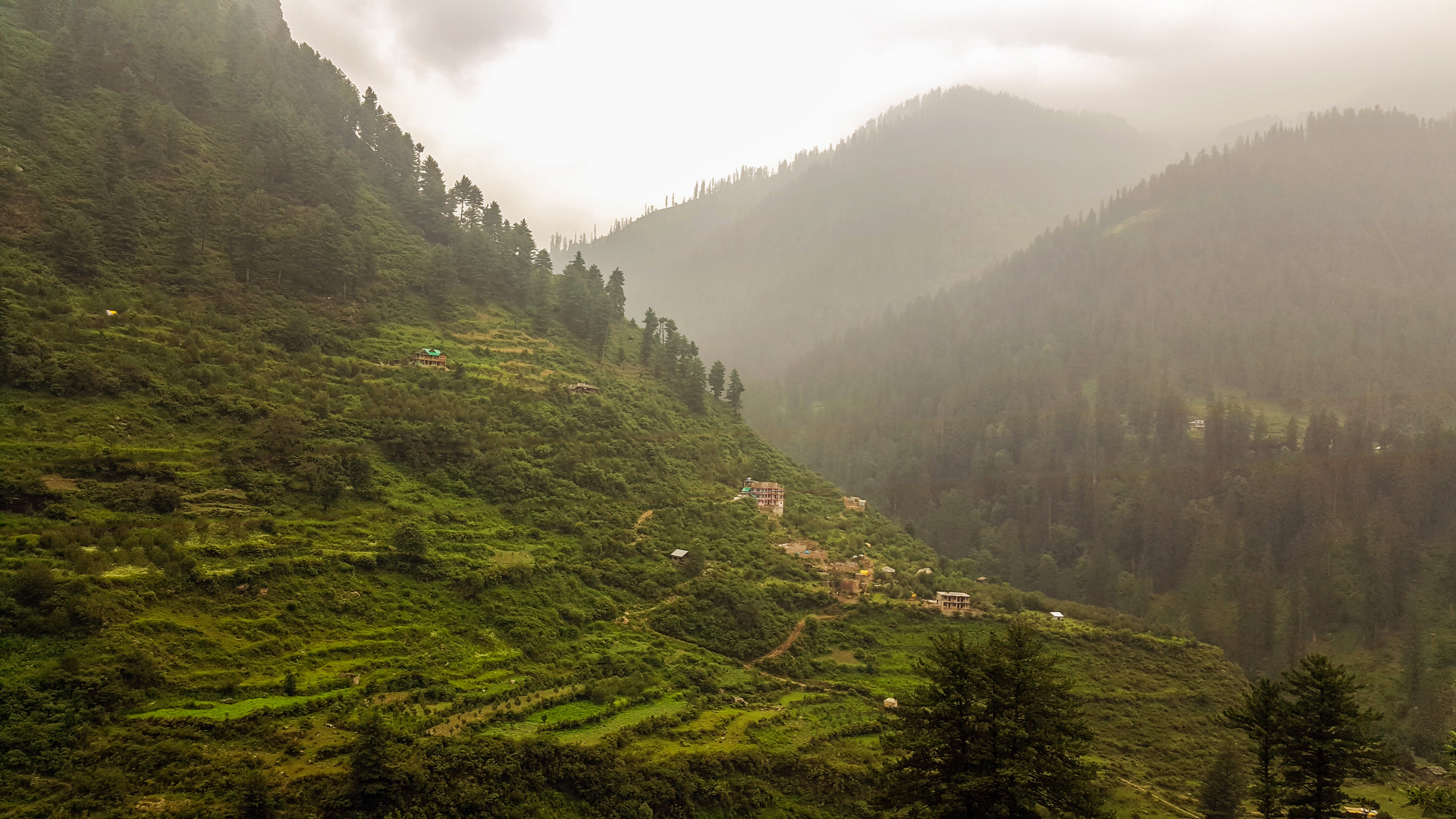

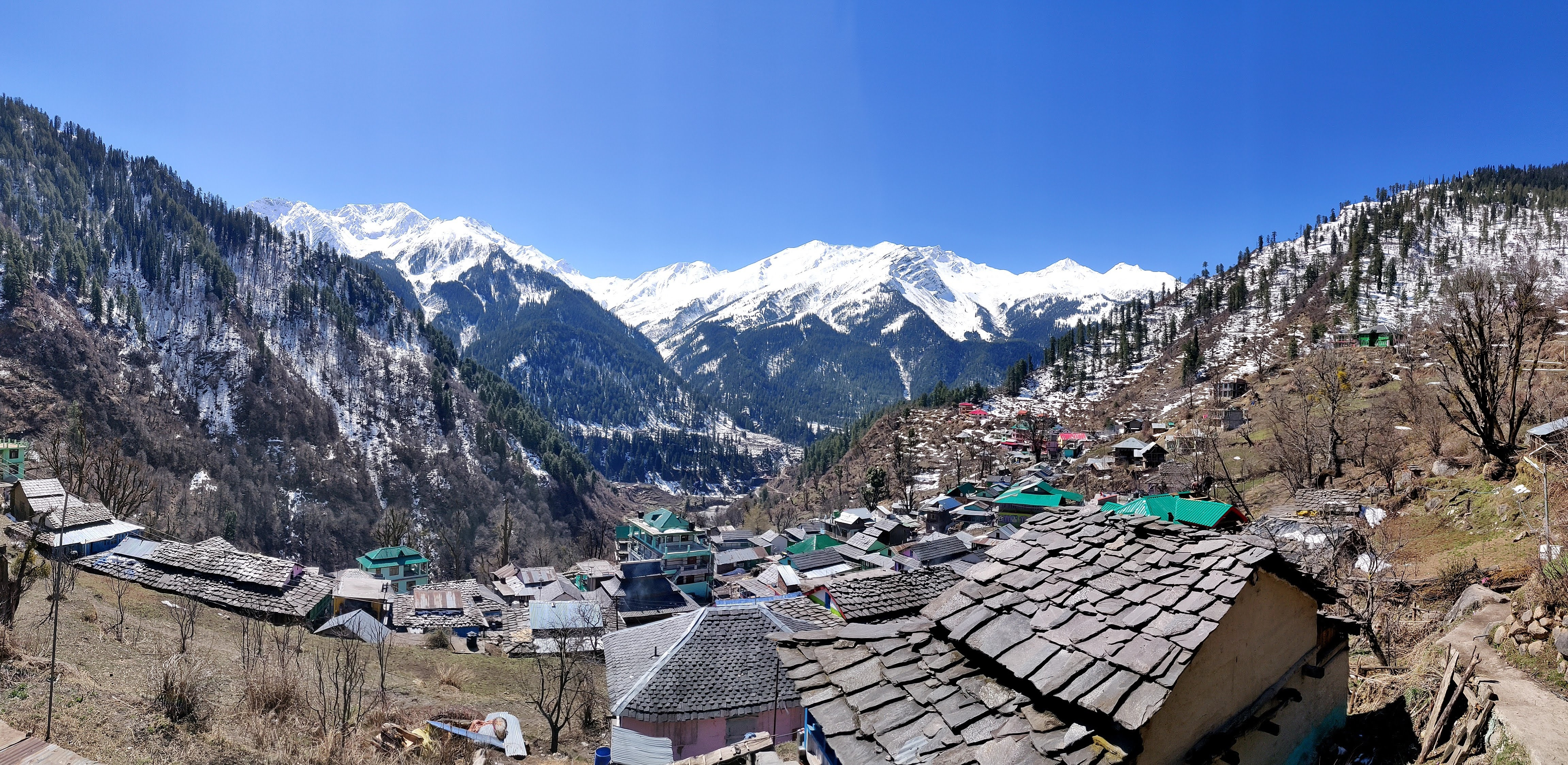
Another view from Tosh
