= Bhuntar =

- Town
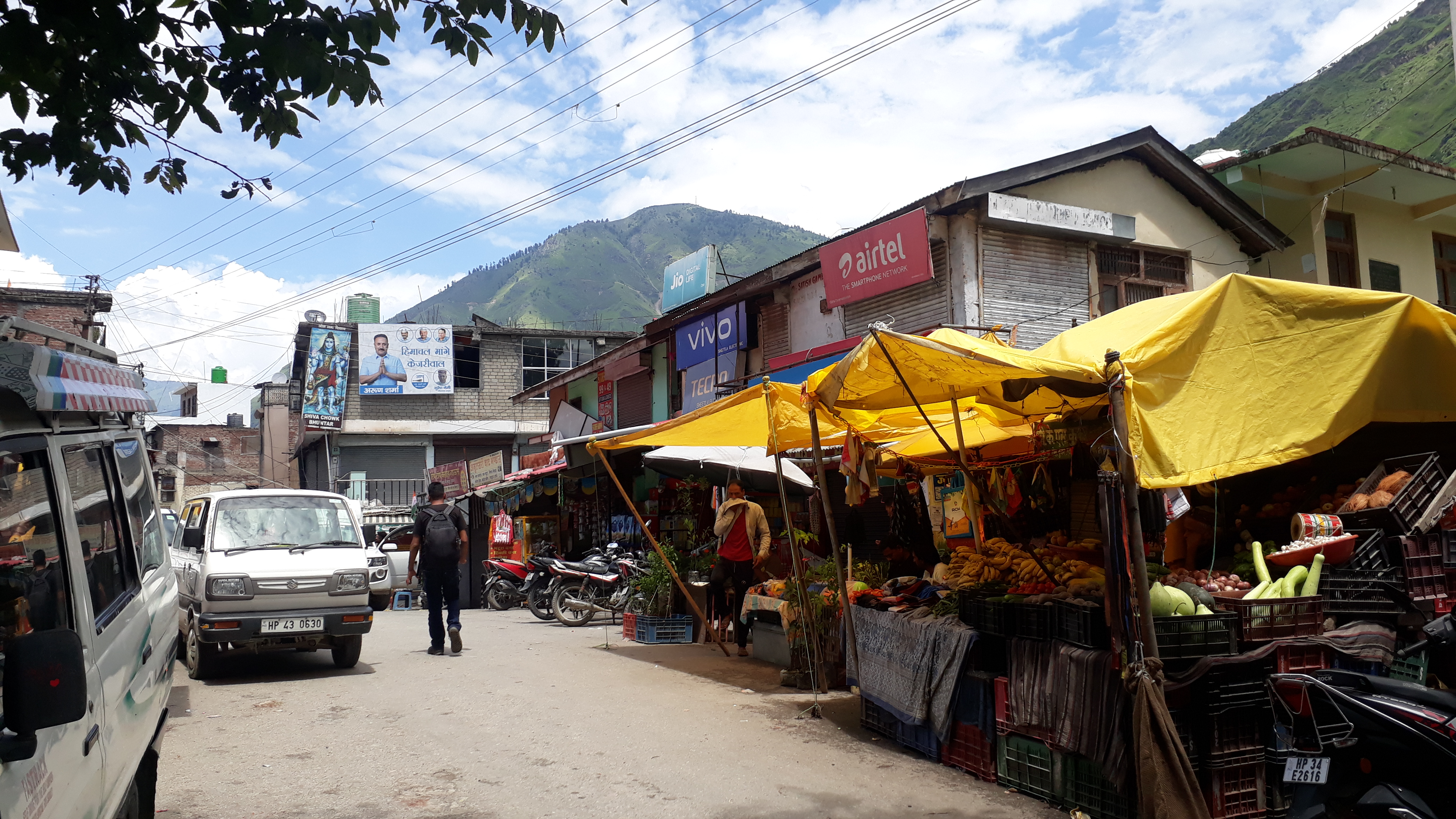
- Bhuntar town

- Location in Himachal Pradesh, India Bhuntar (India)
- Coordinates: 31.86°N 77.15°E
- Country: India
- State: Himachal Pradesh
- District: Kullu

Population (2011)
  - Total: 4,475

Languages
  - Official: Hindi
  - Regional: Kullui
- Time zone: UTC+5:30 (IST)
- Vehicle registration: HP

Bhuntar is a town and a nagar panchayat in Kullu district in the state of Himachal Pradesh, India. It is 11 km from the Kullu town, and lies along National Highway 3. The Kullu-Manali Airport is located in Bhuntar.

== History ==
During the British Raj, Bhuntar had a bazaar and a branch office for post and telegraphs.

In 1905, Duff Dunbar, a British forest officer posted in Kullu, got a suspension bridge constructed at Bhuntar over the Beas River. The bridge connected the Kullu valley to the Parvati valley. The bridge was rendered unserviceable by heavy floods in September 1947. Thakur Beli Ram, a local leader from Kullu, had to take care of this and other simultaneous issues in the wider Kullu region soon after India's Independence.

Bhuntar was electrified alongside Kullu town in 1957. By 1961, Bhuntar already had an airstrip.

Bhuntar was first categorized as a town by the Census of India 1981.

== Geography ==
Bhuntar is located on the right bank of the Beas River. Directly opposite Bhuntar, near the left bank of the Beas River, lies the confluence of the Parvati River with the River Beas. The Parvati Valley begins at this confluence and runs eastward, through a steep-sided valley towards Kasol and Manikaran.

The next major settlement after Bhuntar, in the direction of Kullu, is Shamshi.

== Accessibility ==
Bhuntar lies on the National Highway 3, which till 2010 was the National Highway 21.

The airport at Bhuntar connects the Kullu valley to a few major north Indian cities, including Delhi and Amritsar.

Bhuntar is a centre within the Kullu valley for accessing places in the Kullu valley such as Shamshi, Kullu, and Manali, and for places in the Parvati valley such as Manikaran, Kasol, and Tosh.

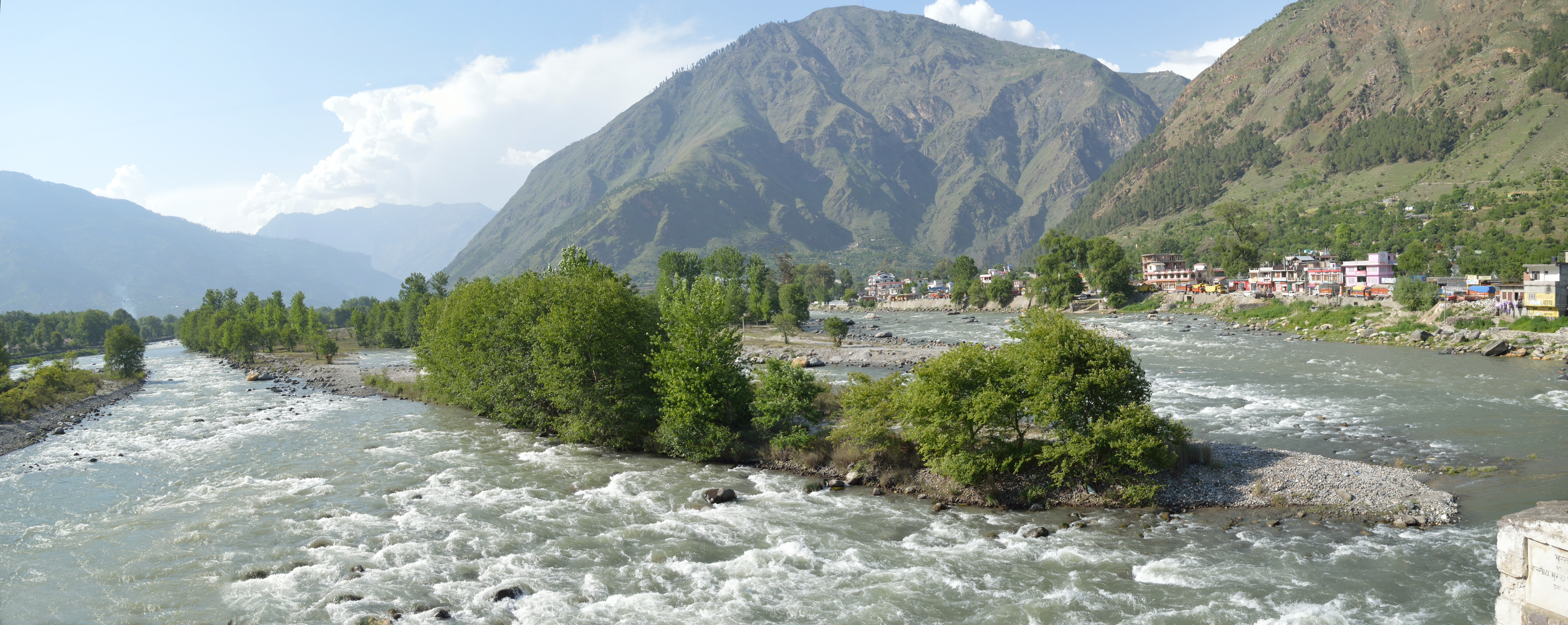
The confluence of rivers Beas and Parvati at Bhuntar.

== Demography ==
As of 2001 India census, Bhuntar had a population of 5260. Males constitute 55% of the population and females 45%. Bhuntar has an average literacy rate of 80%, higher than the national average of 59.5%; with male literacy of 84% and female literacy of 76%. 11% of the population is under 6 years of age.

== Climate ==
Climate data for Bhuntar (Kullu–Manali Airport) 1991–2020, extremes 1960–present)
Month	Jan	Feb	Mar	Apr	May	Jun	Jul	Aug	Sep	Oct	Nov	Dec	Year
Record high °C (°F)	25.4 (77.7)	28.2 (82.8)	32.3 (90.1)	37.3 (99.1)	40.0 (104.0)	39.4 (102.9)	37.4 (99.3)	37.8 (100.0)	35.5 (95.9)	33.6 (92.5)	29.4 (84.9)	27.0 (80.6)	40.0 (104.0)
Mean daily maximum °C (°F)	16.1 (61.0)	18.3 (64.9)	22.7 (72.9)	27.3 (81.1)	31.3 (88.3)	32.9 (91.2)	31.6 (88.9)	30.8 (87.4)	30.1 (86.2)	27.9 (82.2)	22.9 (73.2)	18.2 (64.8)	25.8 (78.4)
Mean daily minimum °C (°F)	1.6 (34.9)	3.8 (38.8)	6.8 (44.2)	9.8 (49.6)	13.1 (55.6)	17.0 (62.6)	20.2 (68.4)	19.9 (67.8)	16.8 (62.2)	10.1 (50.2)	4.9 (40.8)	1.5 (34.7)	10.3 (50.5)
Record low °C (°F)	−4.7 (23.5)	−4.5 (23.9)	0.2 (32.4)	3.5 (38.3)	4.6 (40.3)	6.1 (43.0)	11.1 (52.0)	10.9 (51.6)	7.8 (46.0)	3.5 (38.3)	−1.5 (29.3)	−5.2 (22.6)	−5.2 (22.6)
Average rainfall mm (inches)	81.4 (3.20)	103.4 (4.07)	116.7 (4.59)	78.2 (3.08)	61.3 (2.41)	65.6 (2.58)	135.6 (5.34)	129.4 (5.09)	77.4 (3.05)	24.8 (0.98)	21.6 (0.85)	31.3 (1.23)	926.9 (36.49)
Average rainy days	4.9	6.3	7.6	6.3	5.8	5.6	8.8	9.5	5.2	1.6	1.9	2.0	65.5
Average relative humidity (%) (at 17:30 IST)	51	49	43	39	39	45	59	62	57	45	46	48	48
Source: India Meteorological Department

== Deities of Bhuntar ==
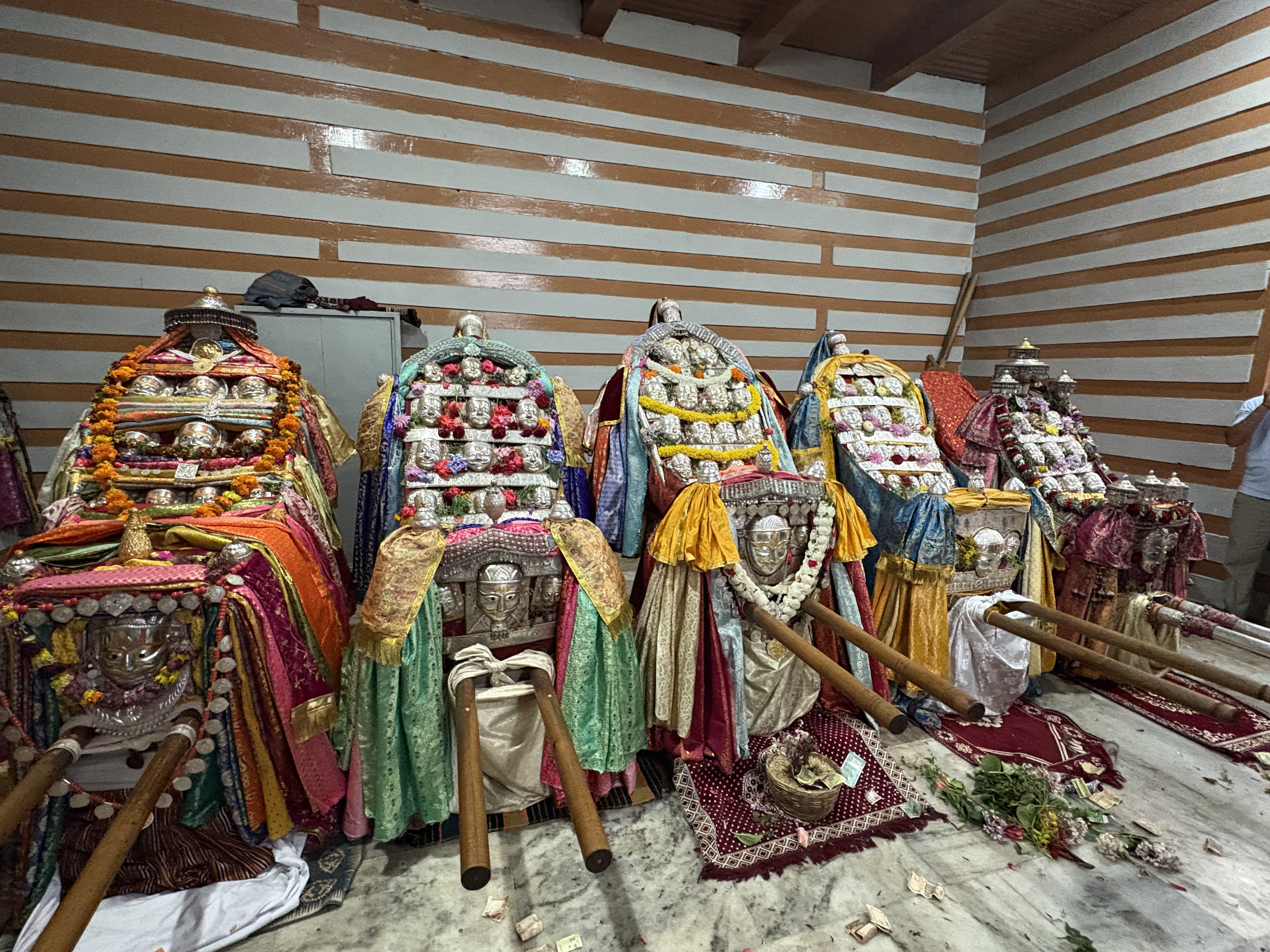

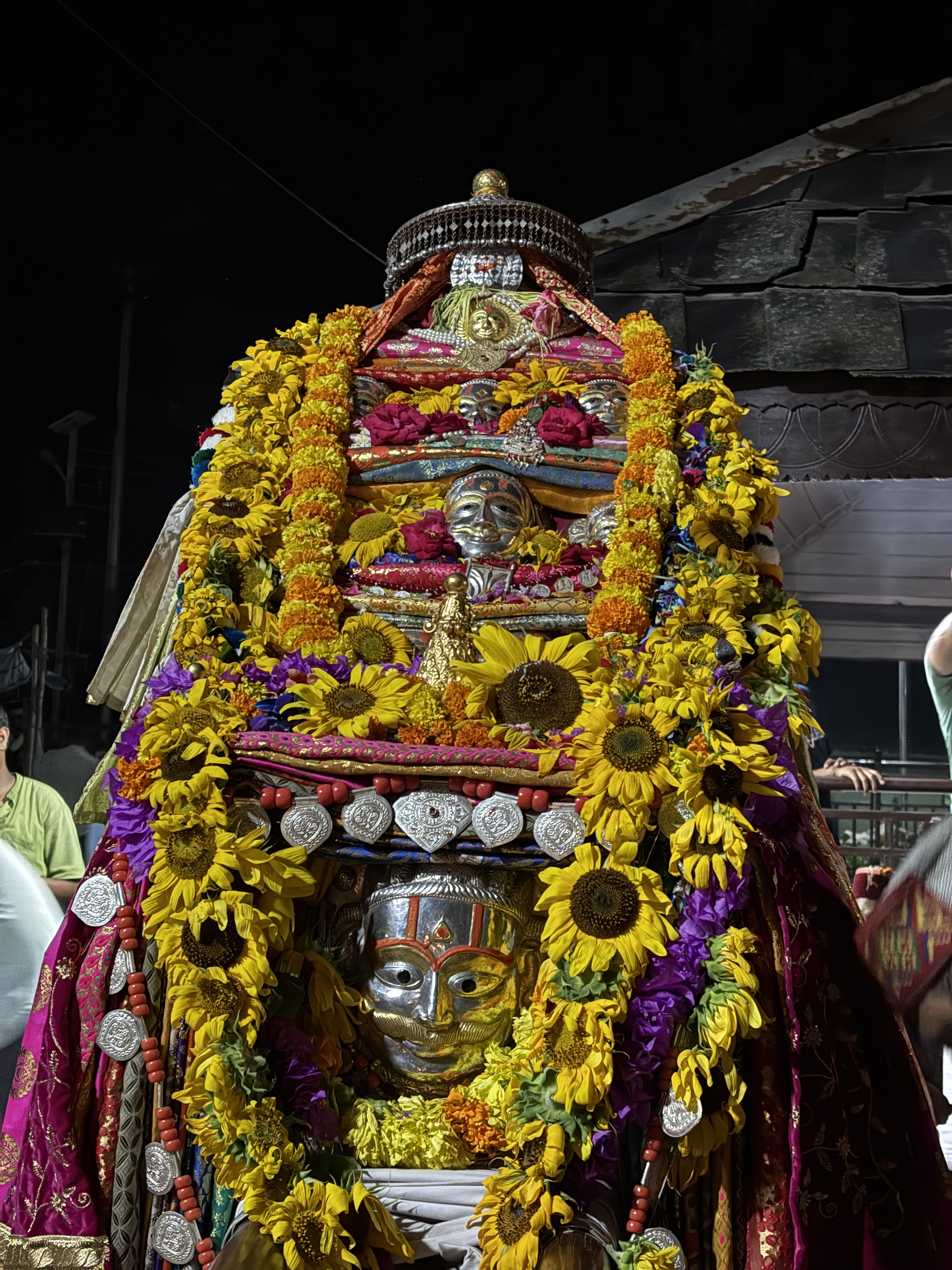

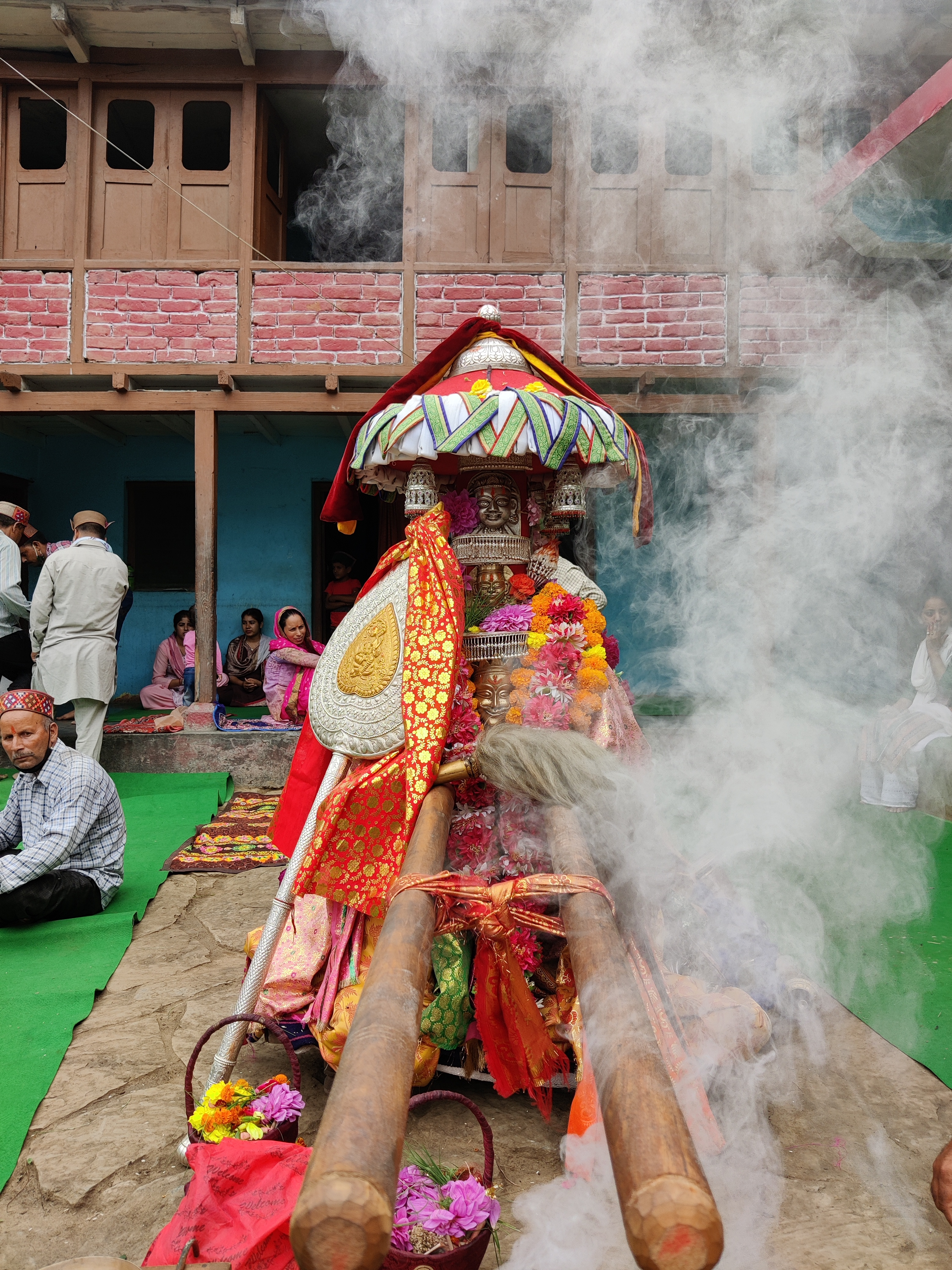
