= Kullu–Manali Airport =

Airport serving Kullu-Manali, Himachal Pradesh, India

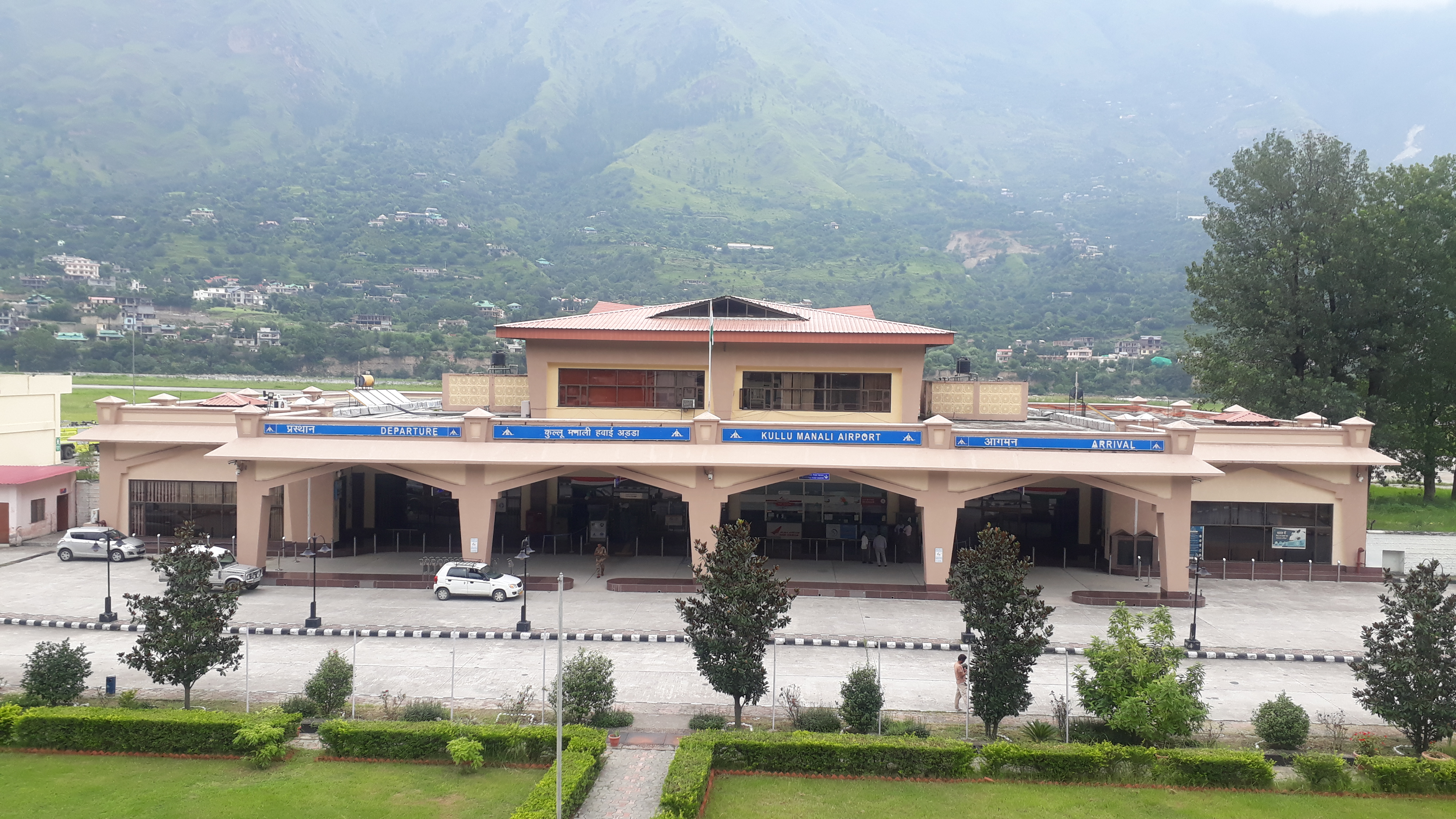
- IATA: KUU; ICAO: VIBR

Summary
- Airport type: Public
- Owner: Government of India
- Operator: Airports Authority of India
- Serves: Kullu, Manali
- Location: Bhuntar, Kullu, Himachal Pradesh, India
- Elevation AMSL: 1,089 m (3,573 ft)
- Coordinates: 31°52′36″N 77°09′16″E
- Website: Kullu-Manali (Bhuntar) Airport

Map
- Location of airport in India KUU (India)

Runways
Direction	Length		Surface
Direction	m	ft	Surface
16/34	1,125	3,690	Asphalt

Statistics (April 2025 – March 2026)
- Passengers: 20,619 (▼30.5%)
- Aircraft movements: 1,113 (▼2.5%)
- Cargo tonnage: 0 ( 0%)
- Source: AAI

Kullu–Manali Airport (IATA: KUU, ICAO: VIBR), also called Bhuntar Airport, is a domestic airport serving the cities of Kullu and Manali in the Indian state of Himachal Pradesh. The airport is located at Bhuntar, 11 km from Kullu and 52 km from Manali.

The airport is considered a challenging airport for pilots because of its single runway set in a deep valley whose peaks rise several thousand feet higher than the runway. Also, the airport is located on the banks of the river Beas, and in 1995, its flash floods posed a threat to the runway. The new air terminal at Bhuntar was inaugurated in 2008, and the airport apron enlarged to park two aircraft at a time. Kingfisher Airlines ceased operations in September 2012 while Air India Regional resumed its operations to Kullu in May 2013. Himalayan Bulls, in collaboration with Deccan Charters, commenced Kullu-Chandigarh-Kullu flights thrice a day from 2 April 2014. As of April 2024, Alliance Air is the sole airline operating to and from the airport.

== Upgrades ==
In order to strengthen air connectivity in the state, the Himachal Pradesh Government plans to upgrade the airport. The Indian Institute of Technology, (IIT) Roorkee has prepared a detailed feasibility report for expanding the airport runway by 550 metres at a cost of Rs. 248 crore. The Airports Authority of India (AAI), which operates the airport, has planned an extension of another 60 metres.

== Airlines and destinations ==
Airlines	Destinations
Alliance Air	Dehradun, Delhi, Jaipur, Amritsar
