= Parvati River (Himachal Pradesh) =

River in Parvati Valley, India

Coordinates: 31°53′33″N 77°11′00″E

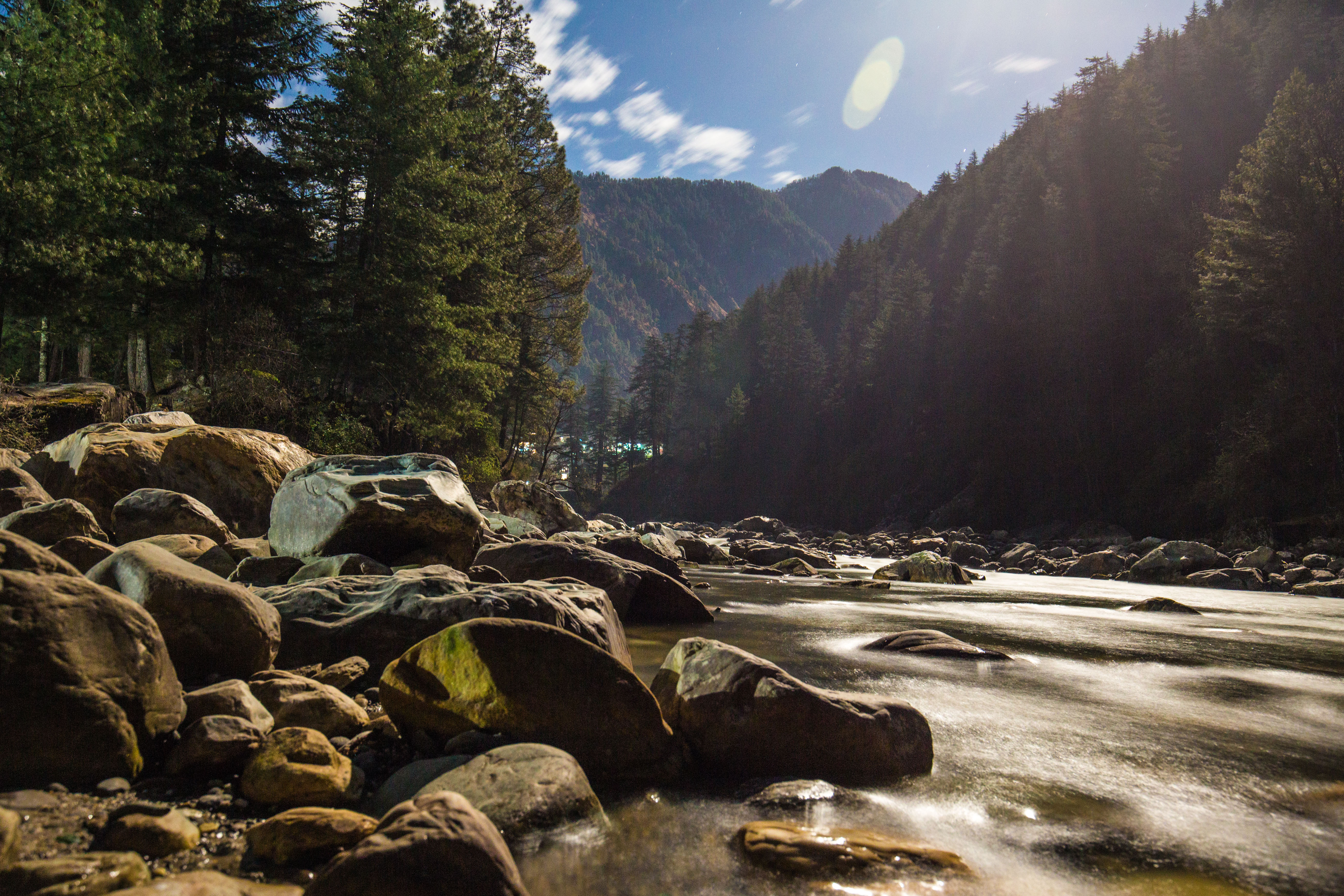
The Moonlit Parvati River flowing beside Kasol Town, Himachal Pradesh

Parvati River is a river in the Parvati Valley in Himachal Pradesh, northern India that flows into the Beas River at Bhuntar, some 10 km south of Kullu. It rises from the Man Talai Glacier below the Pin Parbati Pass and flows in a gradual curve from north-northwest to west-southwest past the important temple town of Manikaran.

The river valley has been a route to various places: Lahul across the Sara Umga La pass, Spiti across the famous Pin Parbati Pass, and the recently discovered (1995) Debsa Pass. The river has fine first-growth forests in its upper reaches which are being degraded as a consequence of development of its vast hydro-electric potential. There are geothermal springs on the banks of the river at Manikaran and Kheerganga.

== Gallery ==
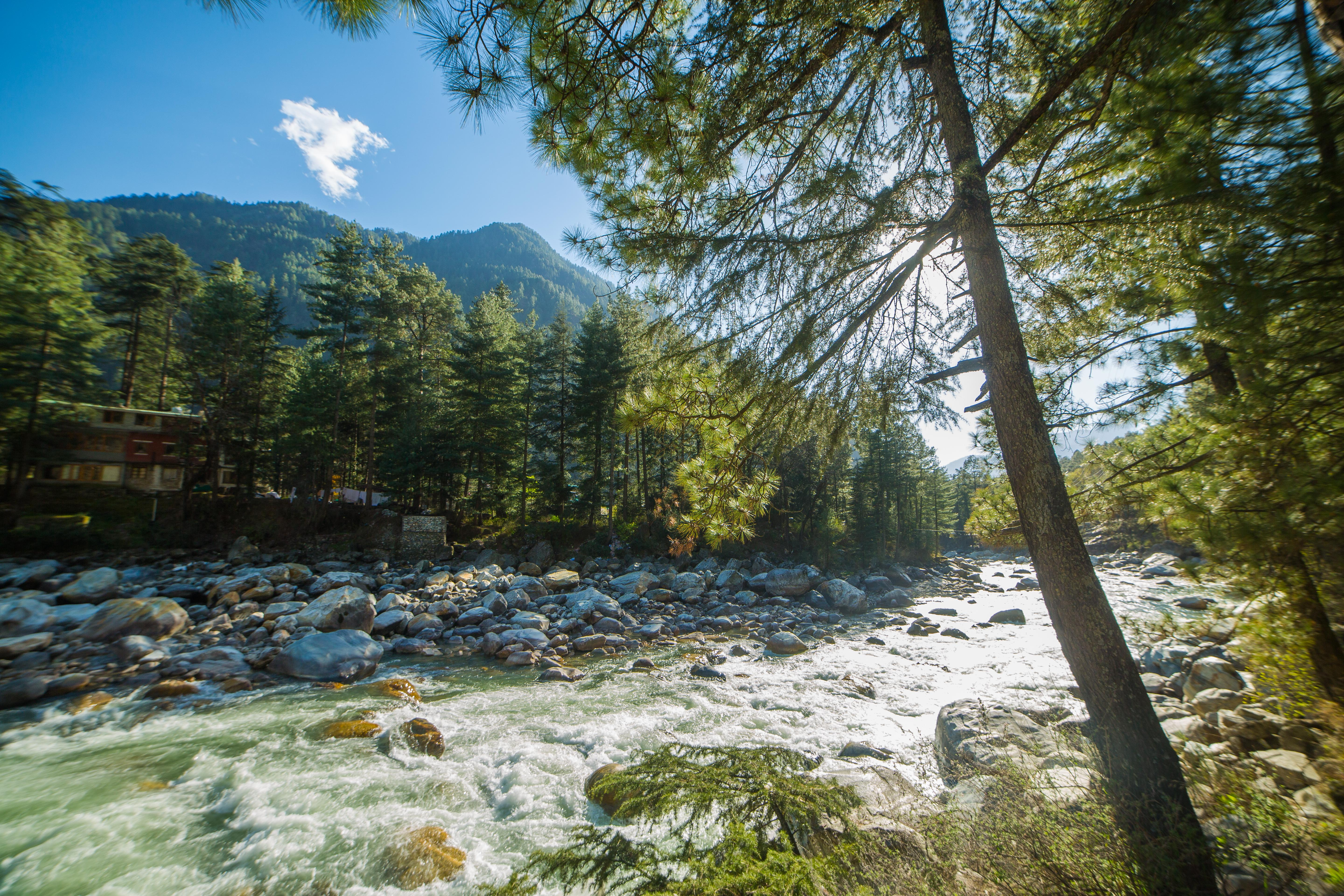
The Fast Flowing Parvati River on the banks of Kasol, Himachal Pradesh

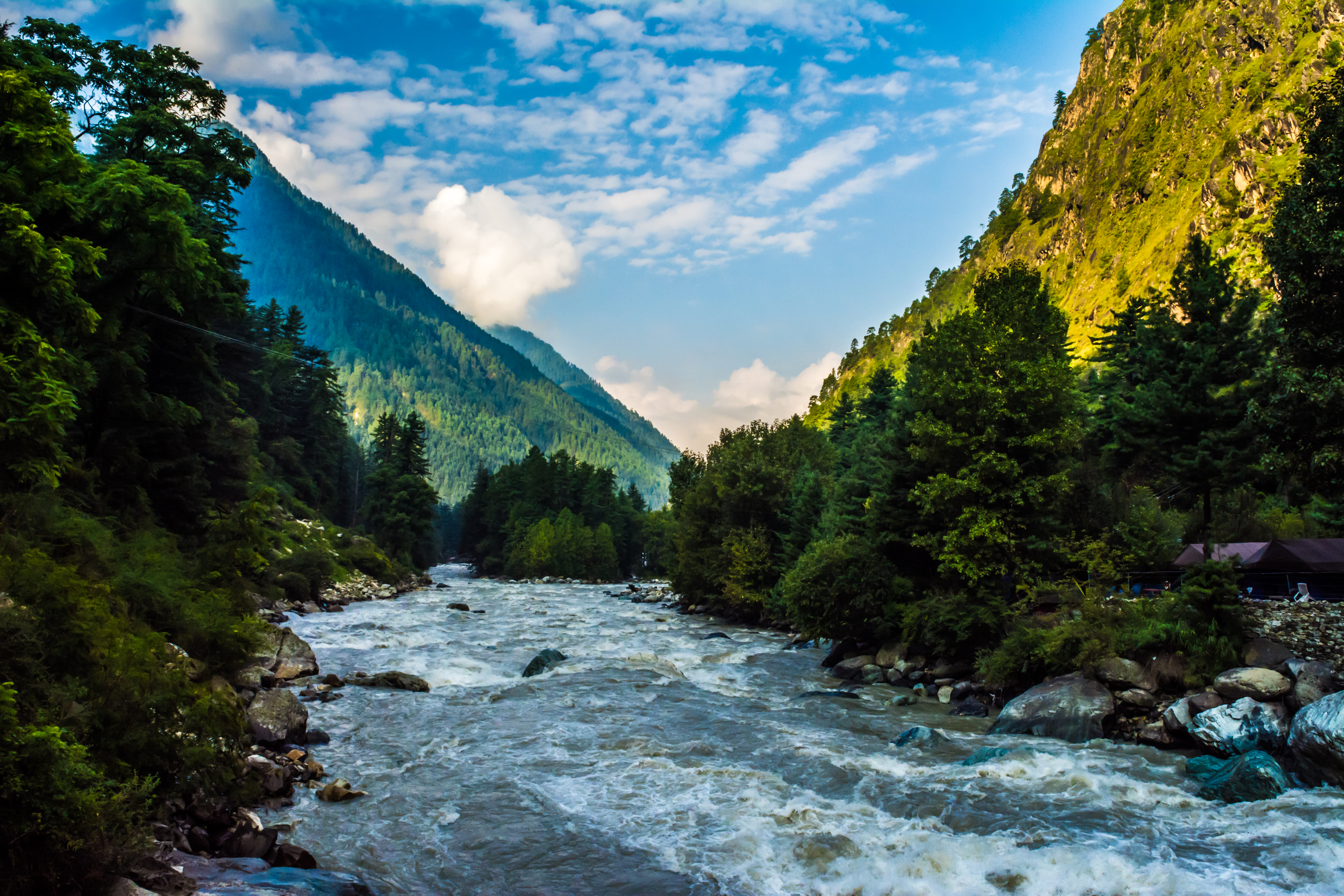
Parvati river flowing in sweeping meanders, Kasol.

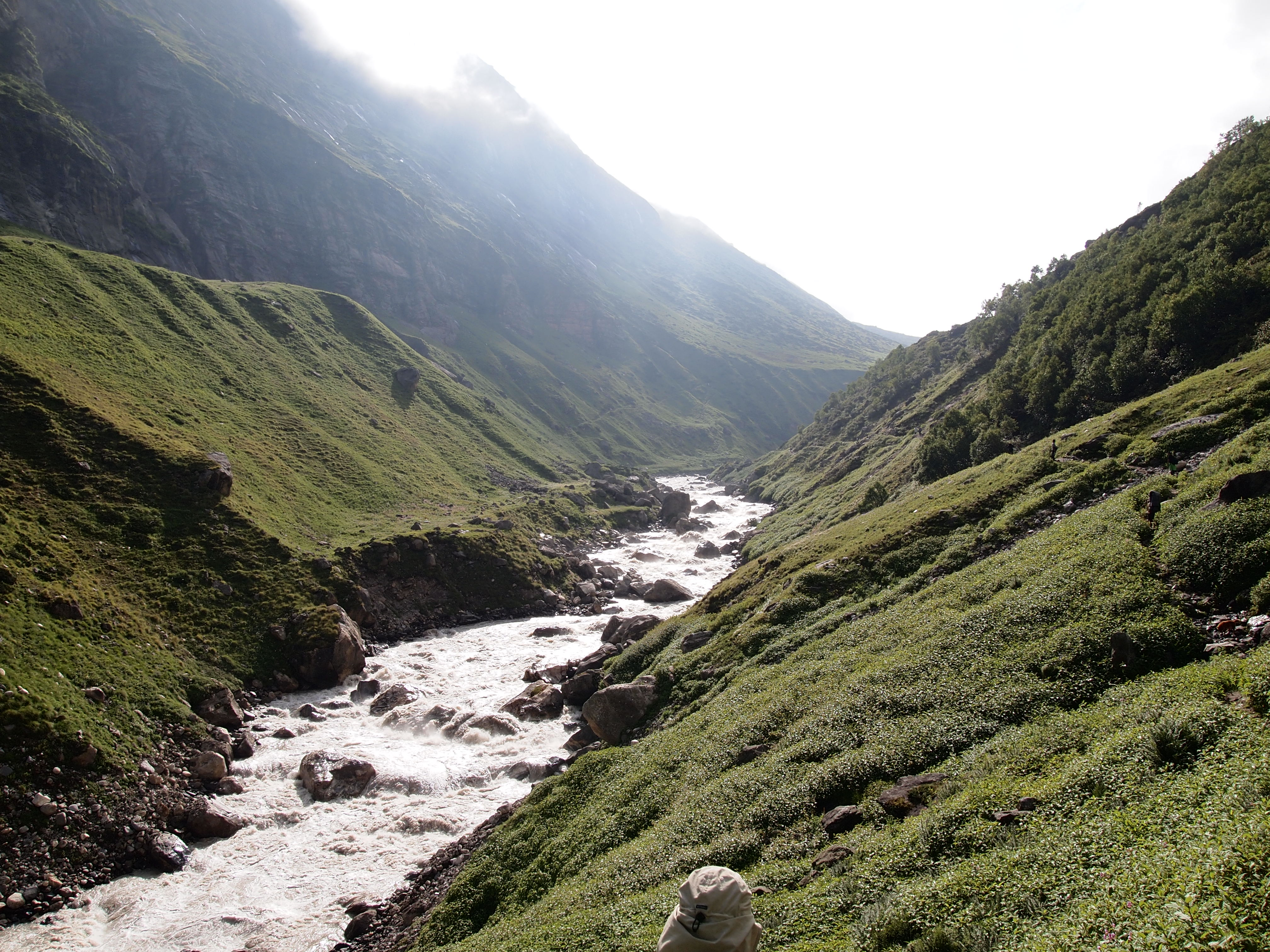
Parvati River

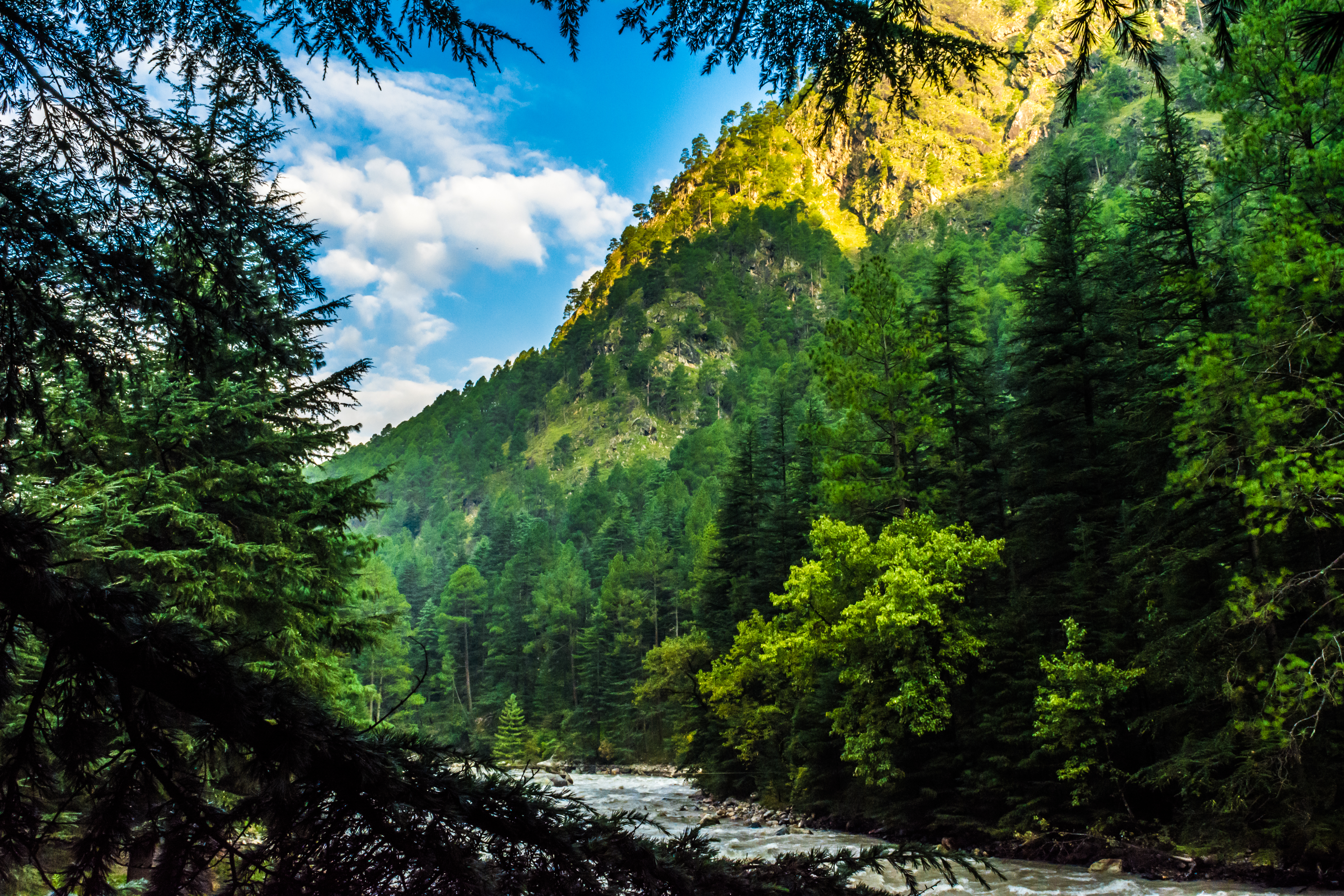
Parvati River, Kasol

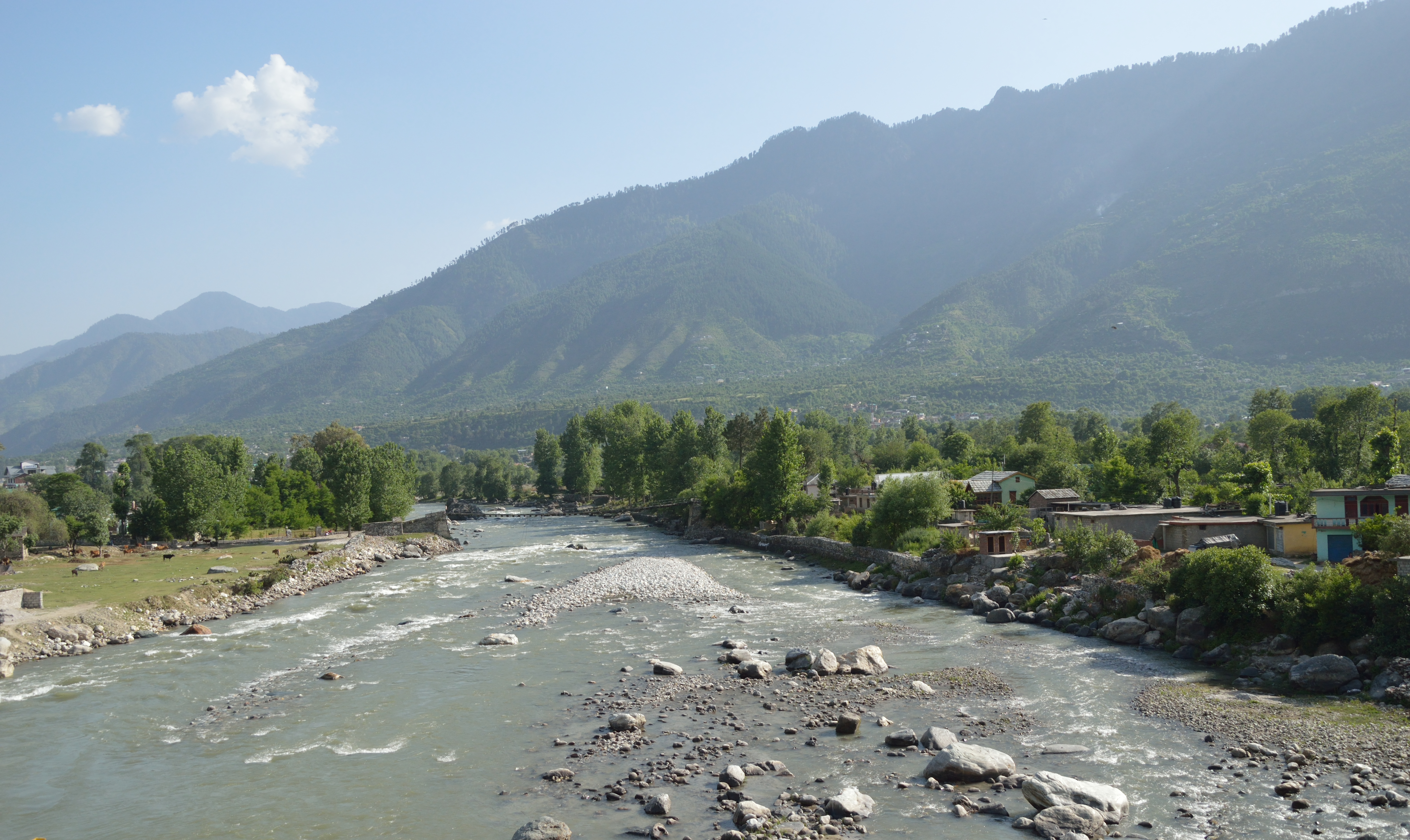
Parvati River, Jia Bride, Kullu

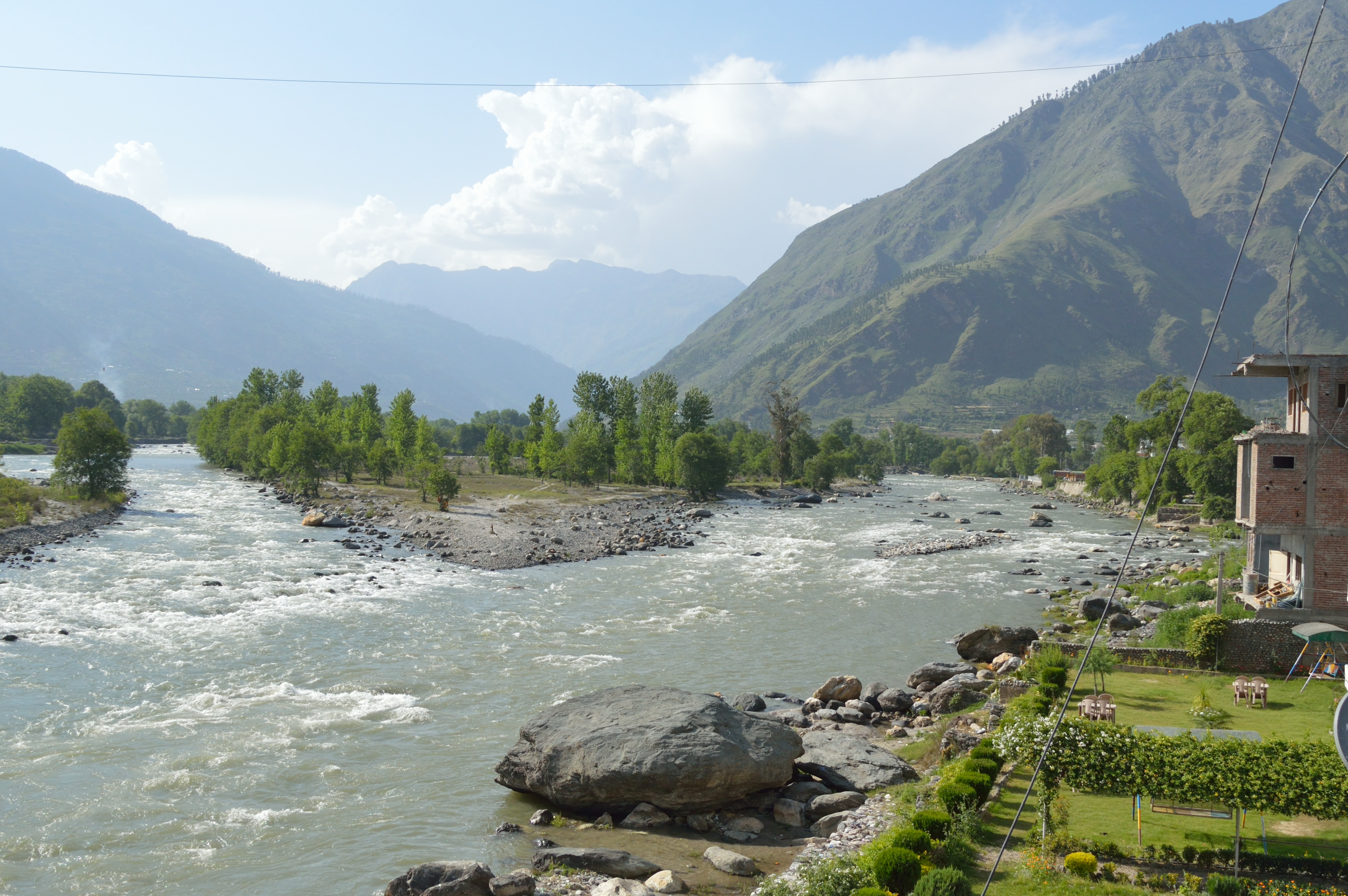
River Beas and River Parvati

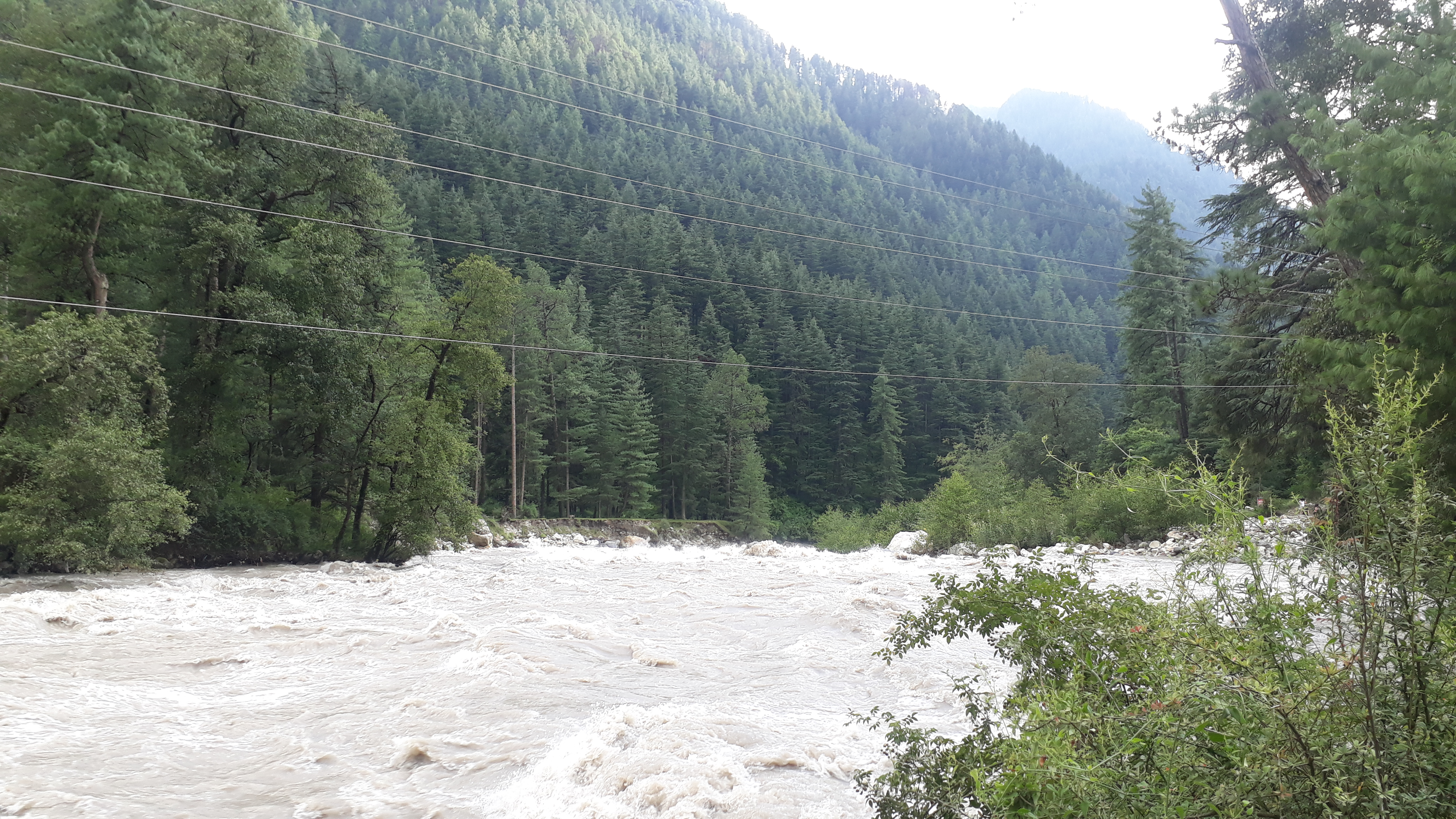
Parvati River near Kasol town
