= Kasol =

- Hill Station
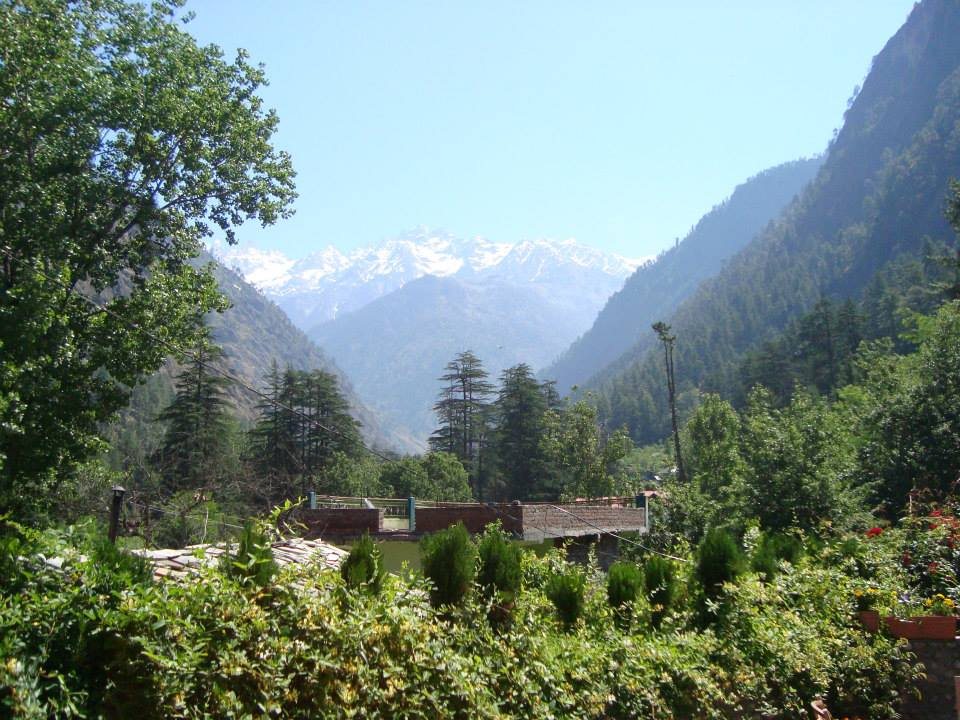
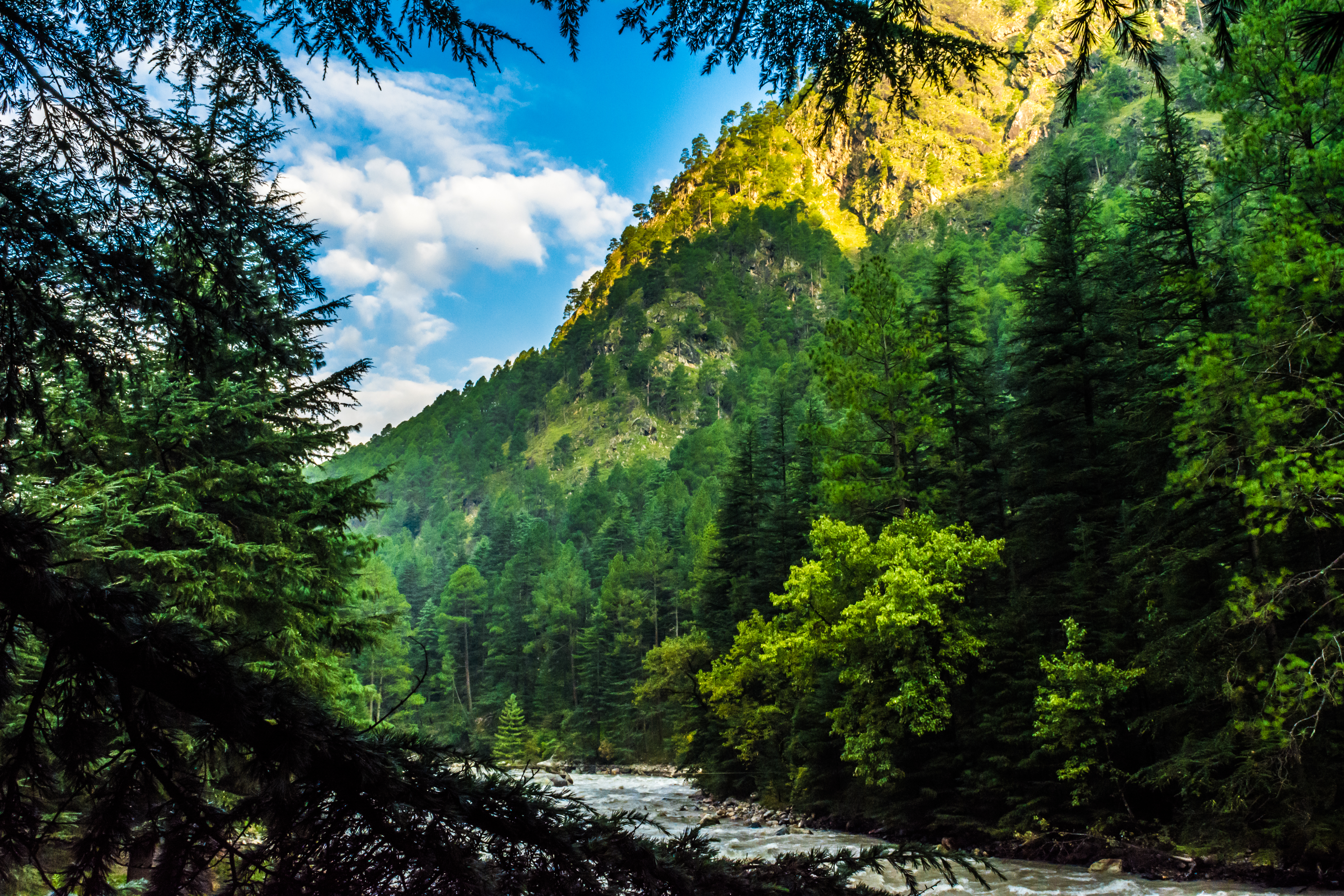
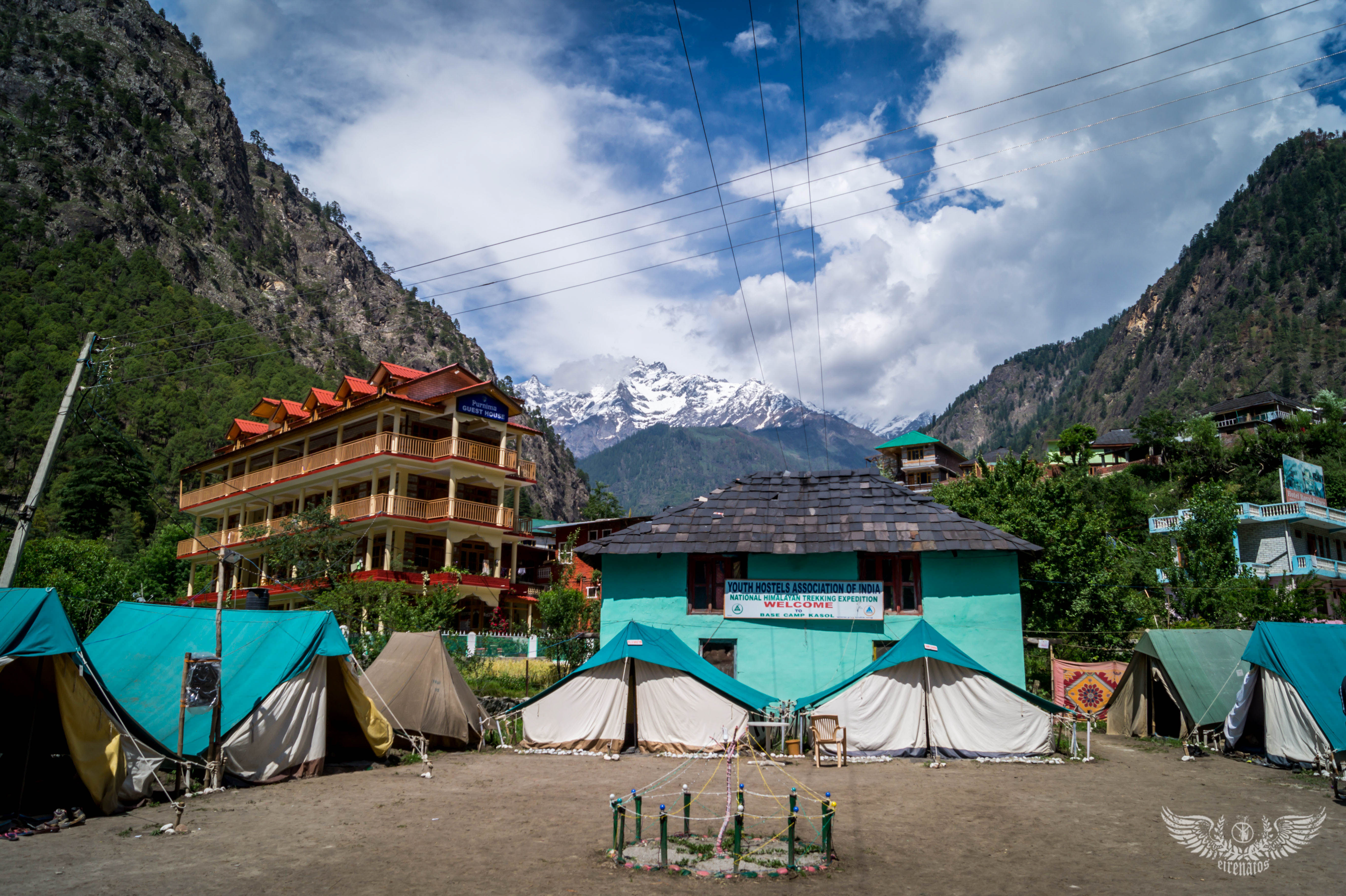
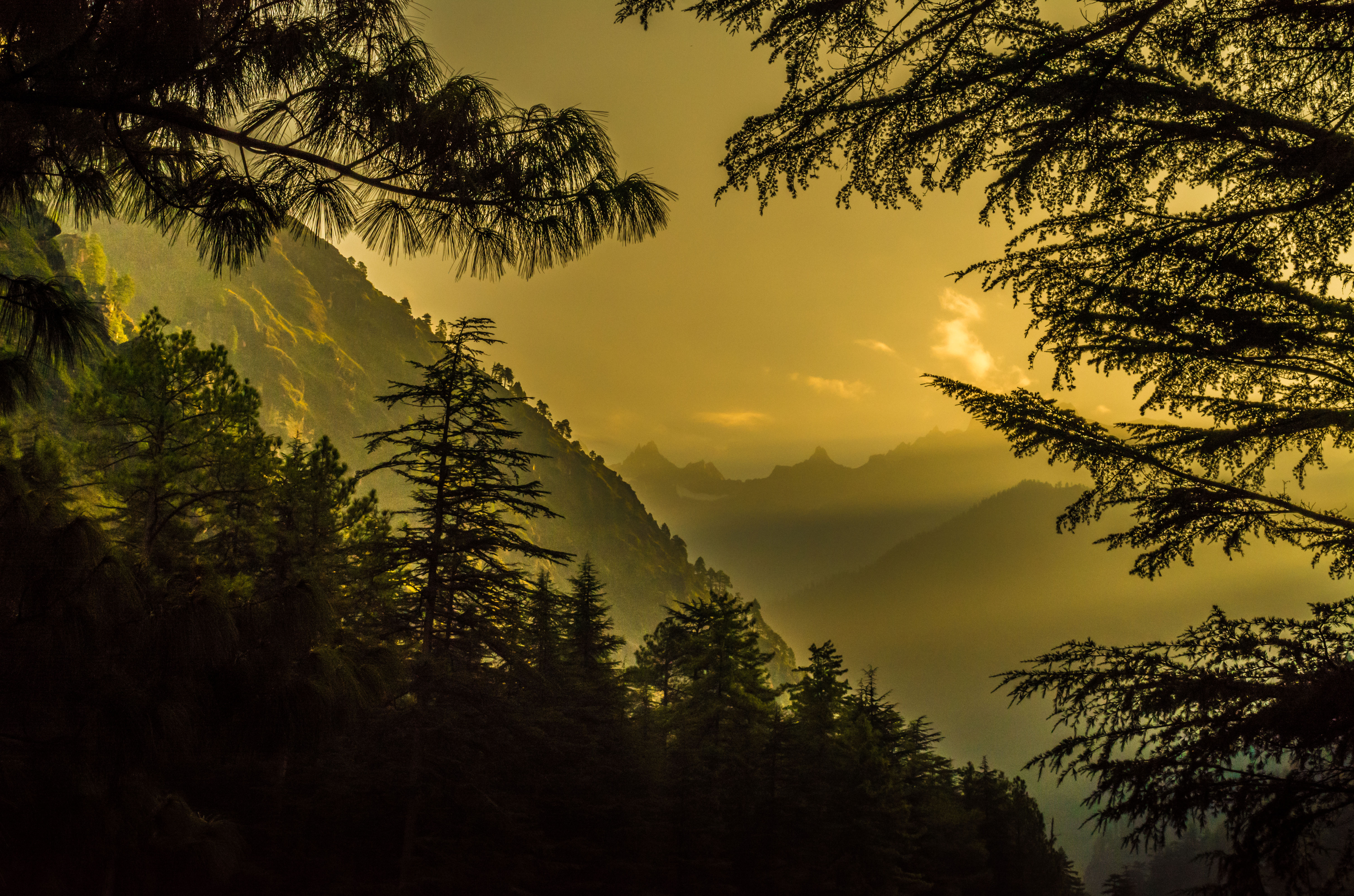
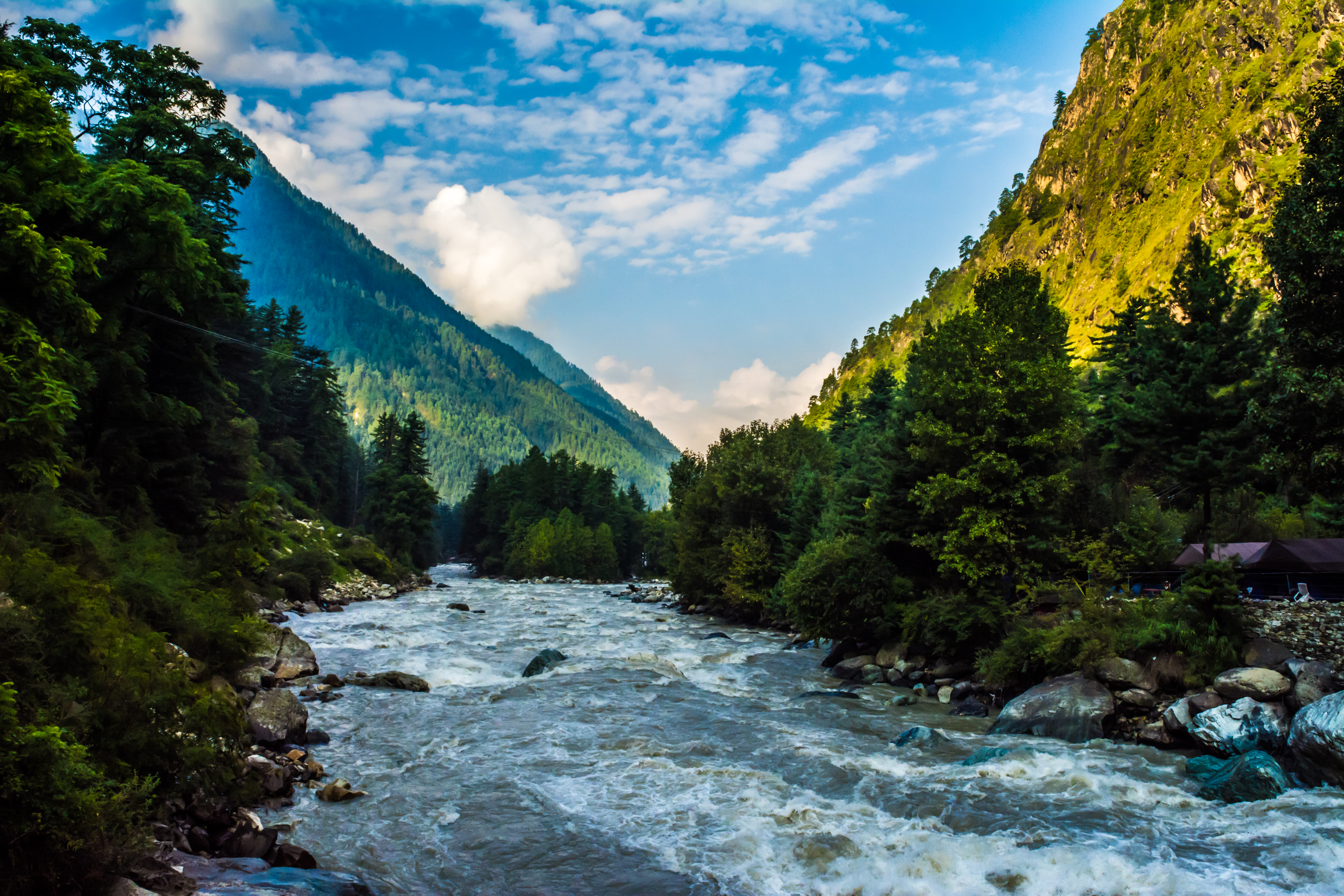
- Kasol Mountain View
- Nickname: Mini Israel of India
- Location in Himachal Pradesh, India Kasol (India)
- Coordinates: 32°00′35″N 77°18′55″E
- Country: India
- State: Himachal Pradesh
- District: Kullu

Area
  - Total: 0.36 km^{2} (0.14 sq mi)
- Elevation: 1,580 m (5,180 ft)

Language
  - Official: Hindi
  - Additional official: Sanskrit
  - Regional: Kullui
- Time zone: UTC+5:30 (IST)
- Telephone code: 01907
- Vehicle registration: HP- HP-
- Nearest city: Kullu
- Climate: Humid Subtropical (Köppen)
- Festivals: Himachal Hills Festival

Kasol is a hamlet in the Kullu district of the Indian state of Himachal Pradesh. It is situated in Parvati Valley, on the banks of the Parvati River between Bhuntar and Manikaran. It is located 30 km (19 mi) from Bhuntar, 3.5 km from Manikaran and 36 km (22 mi) from Kullu town, the district headquarters. Kasol is a popular Himalayan destination for backpackers and acts as a base for nearby treks to Malana and Kheerganga. It is called Mini Israel of India due to a high percentage of Israeli tourists here.

== Nearby airport and railway station ==
Due to its high altitude, Kasol is only connected to the rest of India by well-developed roads.

Kullu-Manali Airport (IATA: KUU, ICAO: VIBR) in Bhuntar is about 31 km away and is the closest airport to the village. It connects cities like Delhi, Shimla, Kolkata and more. Joginder Nagar is the nearest railway station and is about 144 km away.

Also, Chandigarh Airport (IXC) is 260 km from Kasol.

== Climate ==
Kasol has good weather for several months of the year and receives a fair amount of snowfall from late December to February. Köppen-Geiger climate classification system classifies its climate as humid subtropical (Cwa).

Climate data for Kasol, Himachal Pradesh
Month	Jan	Feb	Mar	Apr	May	Jun	Jul	Aug	Sep	Oct	Nov	Dec	Year
Mean daily maximum °C (°F)	11.6 (52.9)	14.2 (57.6)	18.8 (65.8)	24 (75)	28.2 (82.8)	29.3 (84.7)	25.9 (78.6)	25 (77)	24.6 (76.3)	22.2 (72.0)	18.3 (64.9)	14.2 (57.6)	21.4 (70.4)
Daily mean °C (°F)	7.4 (45.3)	9.7 (49.5)	14 (57)	18.7 (65.7)	22.9 (73.2)	24.3 (75.7)	22.3 (72.1)	21.7 (71.1)	20.6 (69.1)	17.5 (63.5)	13.3 (55.9)	9.7 (49.5)	16.8 (62.3)
Mean daily minimum °C (°F)	3.2 (37.8)	5.2 (41.4)	9.2 (48.6)	13.4 (56.1)	17.6 (63.7)	19.4 (66.9)	18.8 (65.8)	18.4 (65.1)	16.7 (62.1)	12.8 (55.0)	8.4 (47.1)	5.3 (41.5)	12.4 (54.3)
Average precipitation mm (inches)	111 (4.4)	108 (4.3)	155 (6.1)	103 (4.1)	100 (3.9)	93 (3.7)	324 (12.8)	276 (10.9)	160 (6.3)	70 (2.8)	27 (1.1)	55 (2.2)	1,582 (62.6)
Source: Climate-Data.org (altitude: 1582m)

== Festivals ==
Kasol Music Festival happens in Kasol on New Year's Eve. People from around the world gather for this festival.
