= Manikaran =

Hot springs town in Himachal Pradesh, India

Manikaran is a town located in the Parvati Valley on river Parvati, northeast of Bhuntar in the Kullu District of Himachal Pradesh, India. It is at an altitude of 1760 m and is located 4 km from Kasol, about 45 km from Kullu and about 35 km from Bhuntar. The small town is known for its hot springs and pilgrim centres of Manali and Kullu. An experimental geothermal energy plant has also been set up here.

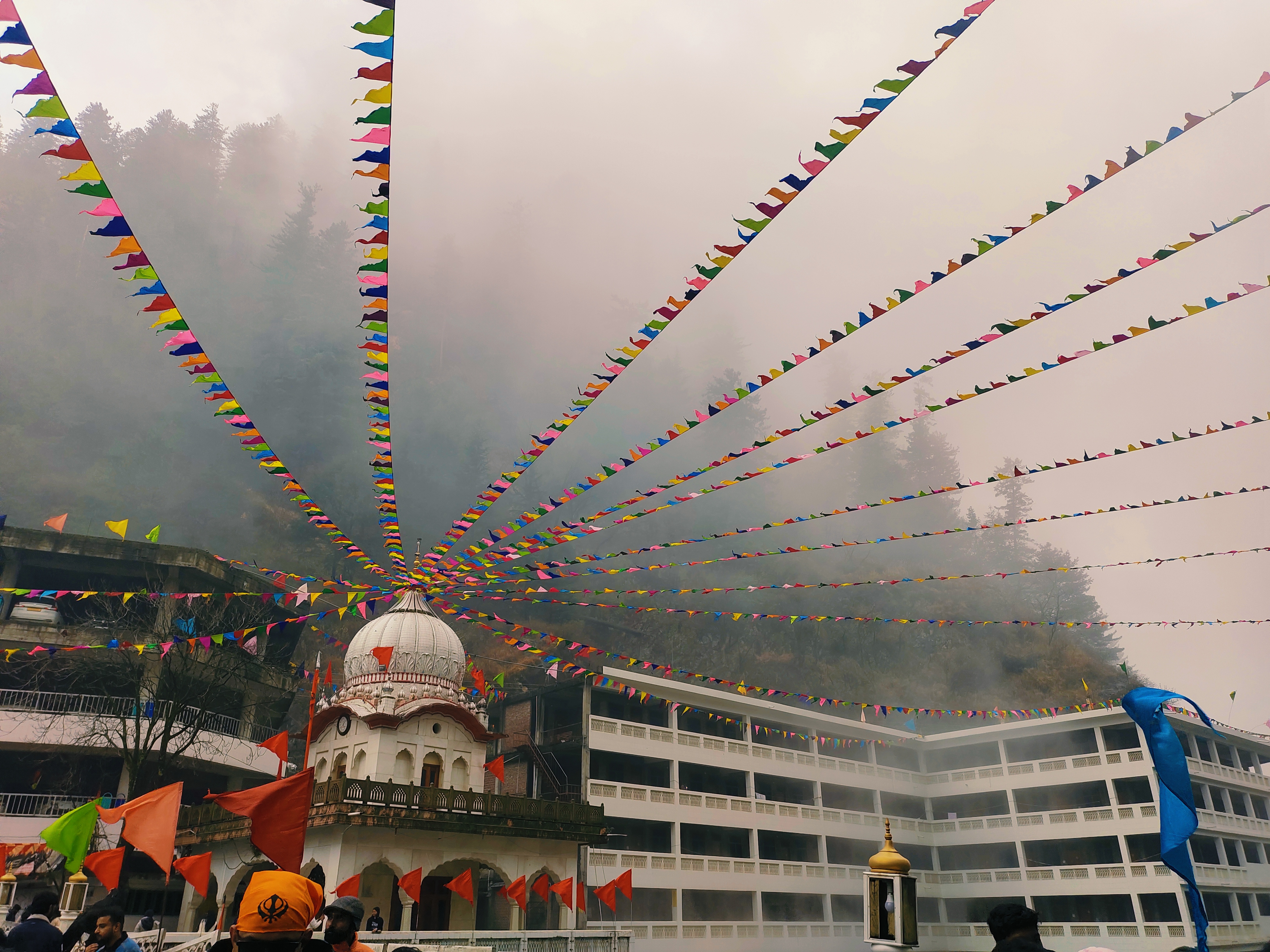
Gurudwara at Manikarn

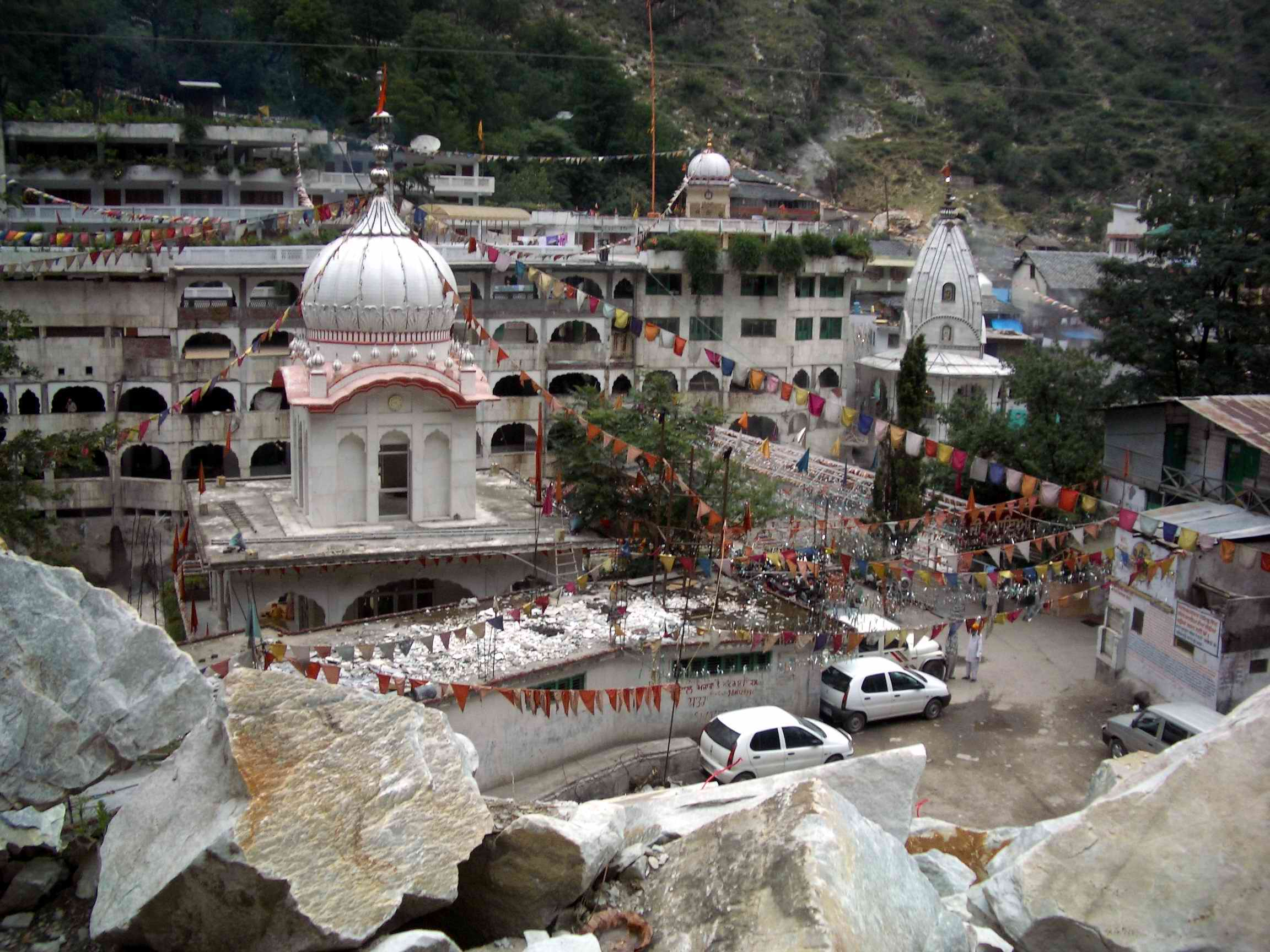
Manikaran

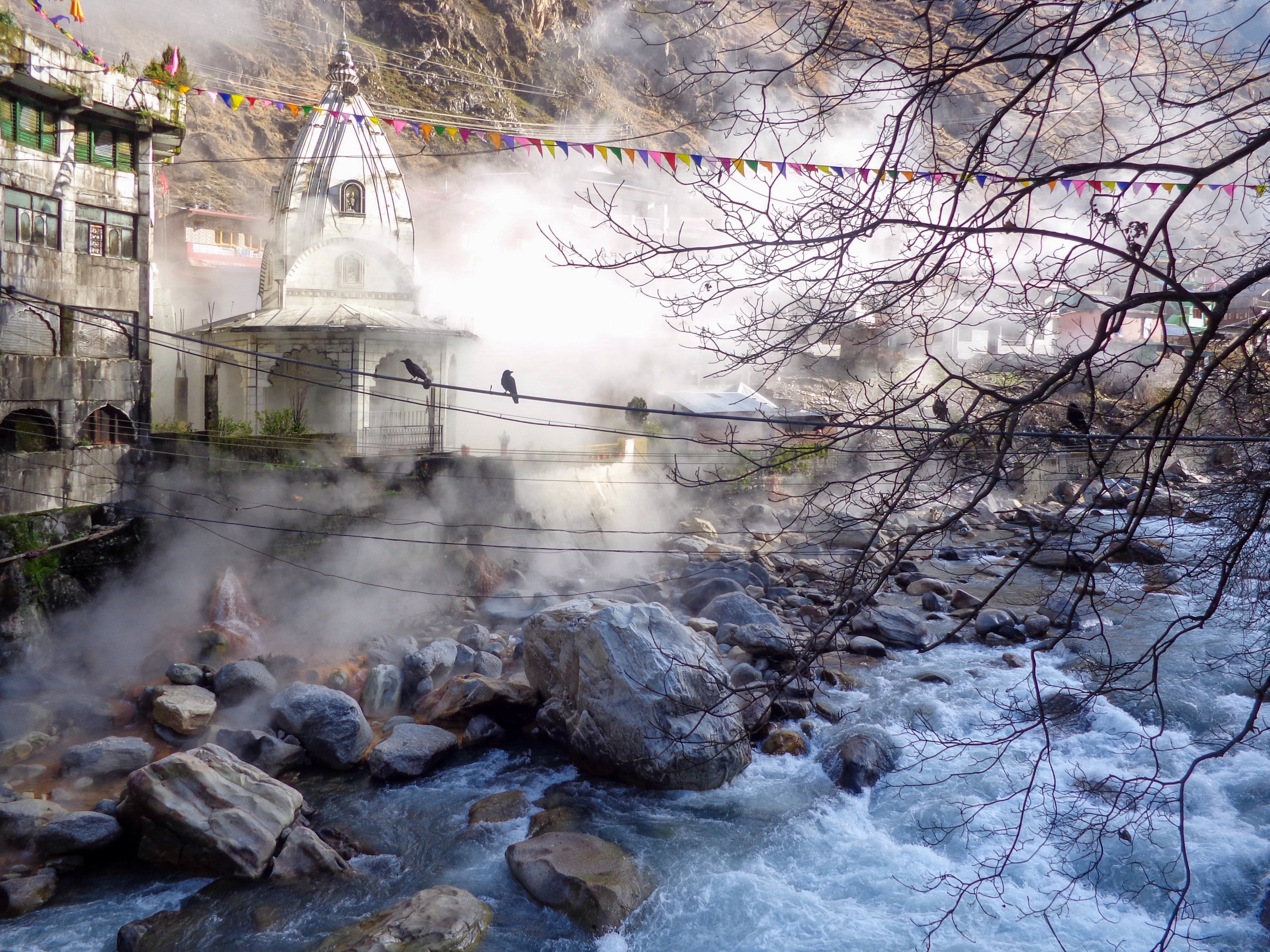
Outer view of the Manikaran temple and Manikaran Sahib gurudwara located at Manikaran featuring the hot water well and the Parvati river flowing past.

== Religious centre ==
Manikaran is a pilgrimage centre for Hindus and Sikhs. The Hindus believe that Manu recreated human life in Manikaran after the flood, making it a sacred area. It has many temples and a gurdwara. There are temples of the Hindu deities Rama, Krishna, and Vishnu. The area is well known for its hot springs and its beautiful landscape.

According to legend, when the Hindu gods Shiva and Parvati were walking in the valley, Parvati dropped one of her earrings. The jewel was seized by Shesha, the serpent deity, who then disappeared into the earth with it. Shesha only surrendered the jewel when Shiva performed the cosmic dance, the Tandava, and shot the jewel up through the water. Apparently, jewels continued to be thrown up in the waters at Manikaran until the 1905 Kangra earthquake.

== Sikh belief ==
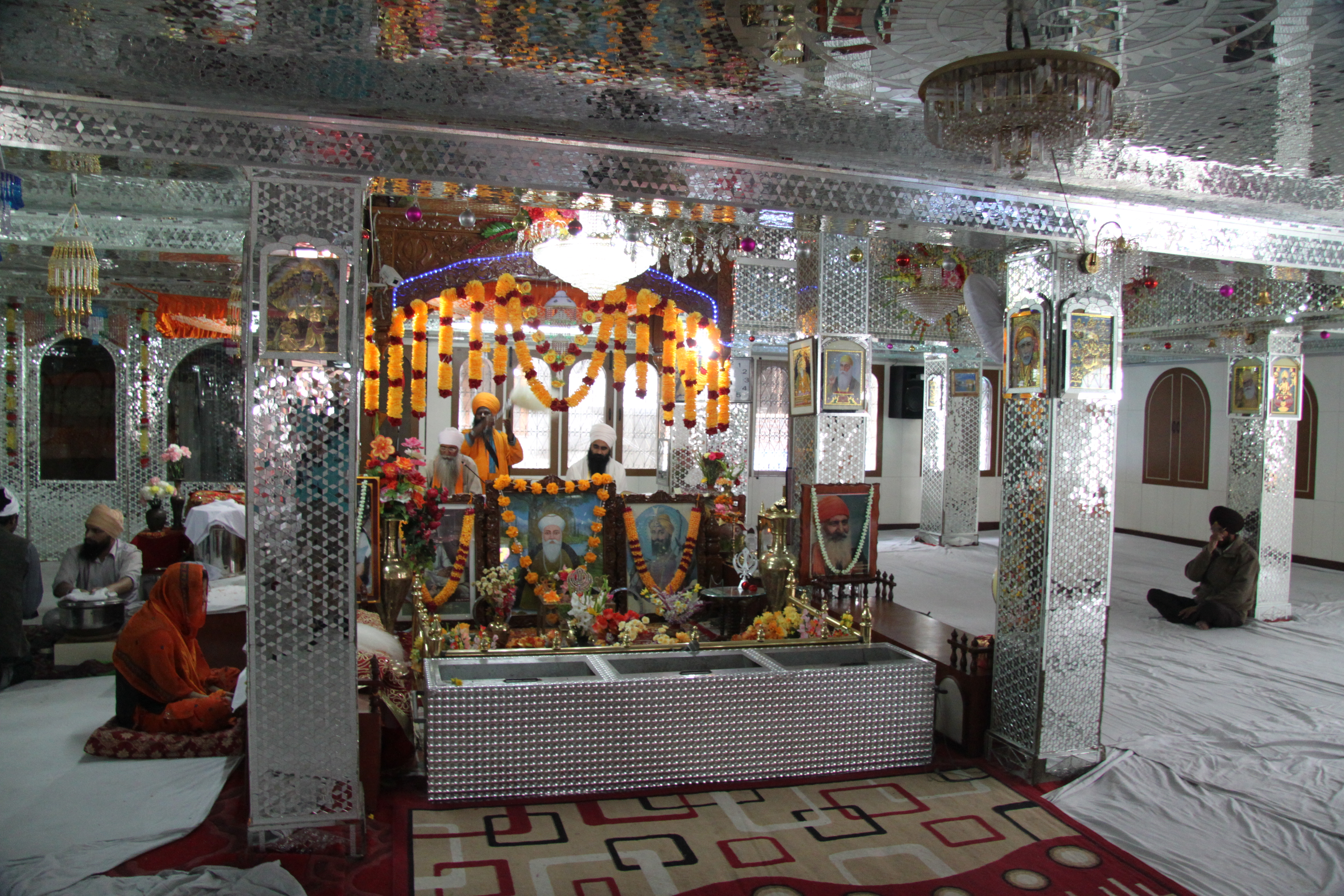
Manikaran gurdwara

According to the Sikhs, during third Udasi, the founder of Sikhism, Guru Nanak, came to this place in 15 Asu 1574 Bikrami with his disciple Bhai Mardana. Mardana felt hungry and they had no food. Guru Nanak sent Mardana to collect food for the langar (the community kitchen). Many people donated atta (flour) to make roti (bread). The one problem was that there was no fire to cook the food. Guru Nanak asked Mardana to lift a stone and he complied and a hot spring appeared. As directed by Guru Nanak, Mardana put the rolled chapatis in the spring, but to his despair, the chapatis sank. Guru Nanak then told him to pray to God saying that if his chapatis float back then he would donate one chapati in His name. When he prayed all the chapatis started floating up duly baked. Guru Nanak said that when anyone who donates in the name of God, his drowned items float back.

== Hindu belief ==
The legend of Manikaran says that while walking around, Shiva and Parvati once chanced upon a lush green place surrounded by mountains. Enamoured by the beauty of the place, they decided to spend some time there. It is believed that they actually spent eleven hundred years here.

During their stay, Parvati lost her earring in the waters of a stream. Upset over the loss, she asked Shiva to retrieve it. Shiva commanded his attendant to find the earring for Parvati. However, when they failed, he was extremely angry. He opened his third eye, a tremendously inauspicious event which led to disturbances in the universe. An appeal was made before the serpent god, Shesha, to pacify Shiva. Sheshnag hissed, thereby giving rise to a flow of boiling water. The water spread over the entire area, resulting in the emergence of precious stones of the type Parvati had lost, and Shiva and Parvati were happy.

== Hindu temples at Manikaran ==
=== Lord Ram Chandra Ji Temple ===
History The temple was constructed by Raja Jagat Singh in the 15th century. It is at an altitude of 1756 m and is located about 35 km from Kullu.

It is claimed that even before 1905, these hot water springs, sprang with full force, making an 11 to 14 feet high fountain. The temperature of different springs at Manikaran is 64 to 80 °C . There is no sulphur in these springs. Food is cooked in these springs. Bathing here is considered a balm for arthritis.

=== Temple of Shiva ===
However, an earthquake in 1905 caused damage to the temple and it was slightly tilted. The importance of Manikaran is also judged from the fact that devas of Kullu valley pay regular visit to this place on specified dates.

== Gallery ==
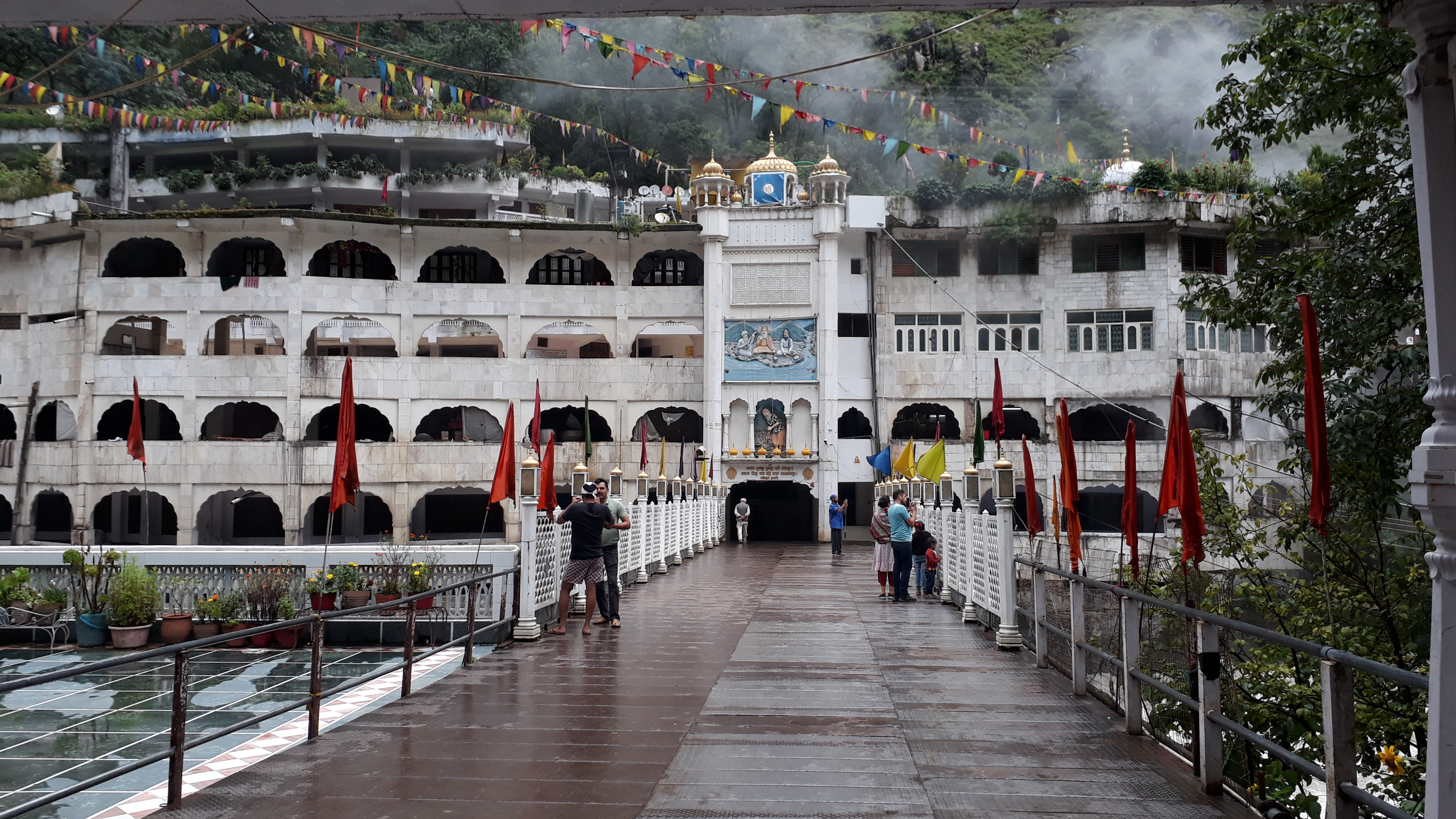
Bridge of Manikaran Gurdwara

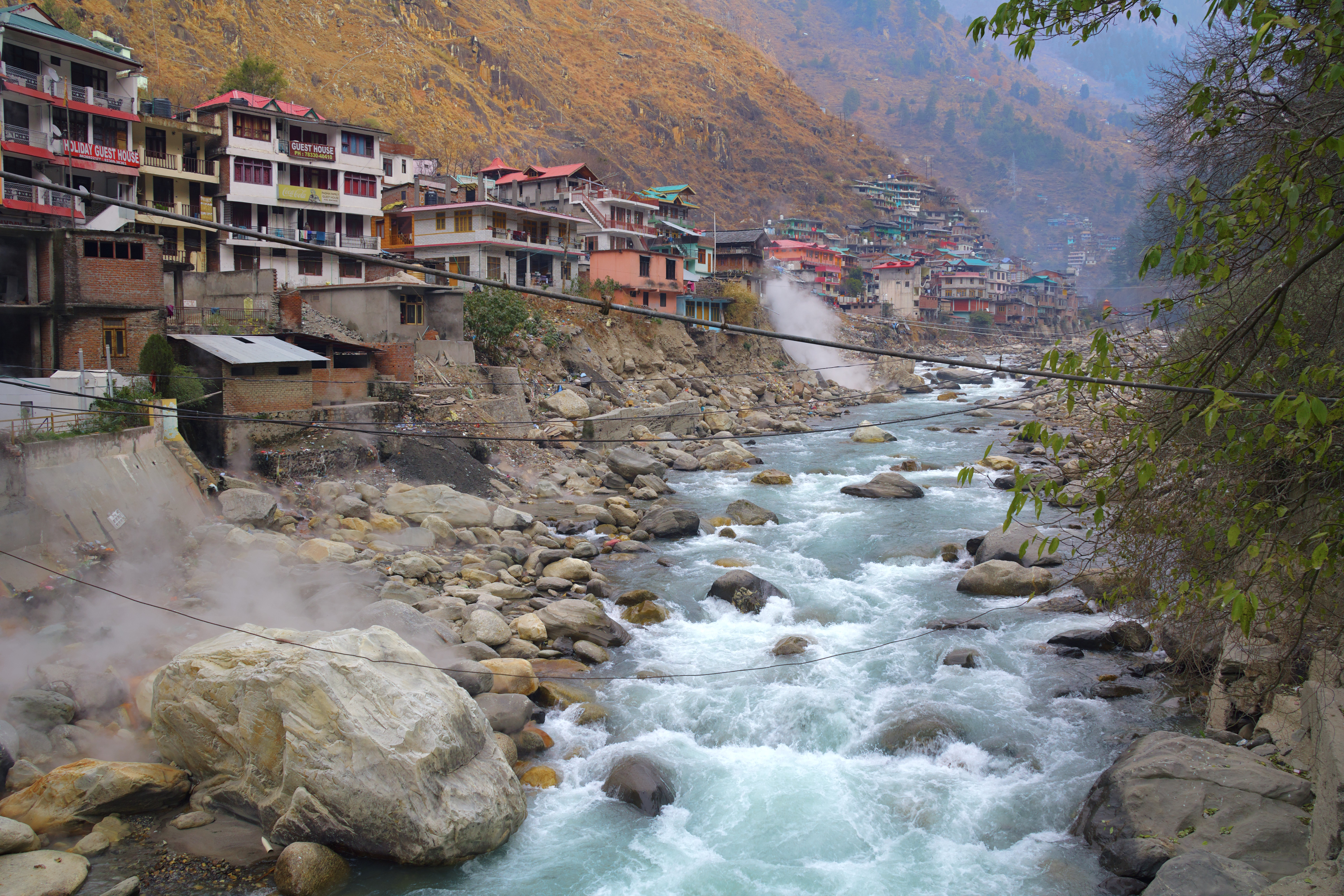
Upstream view of Parwati river from Manikaran

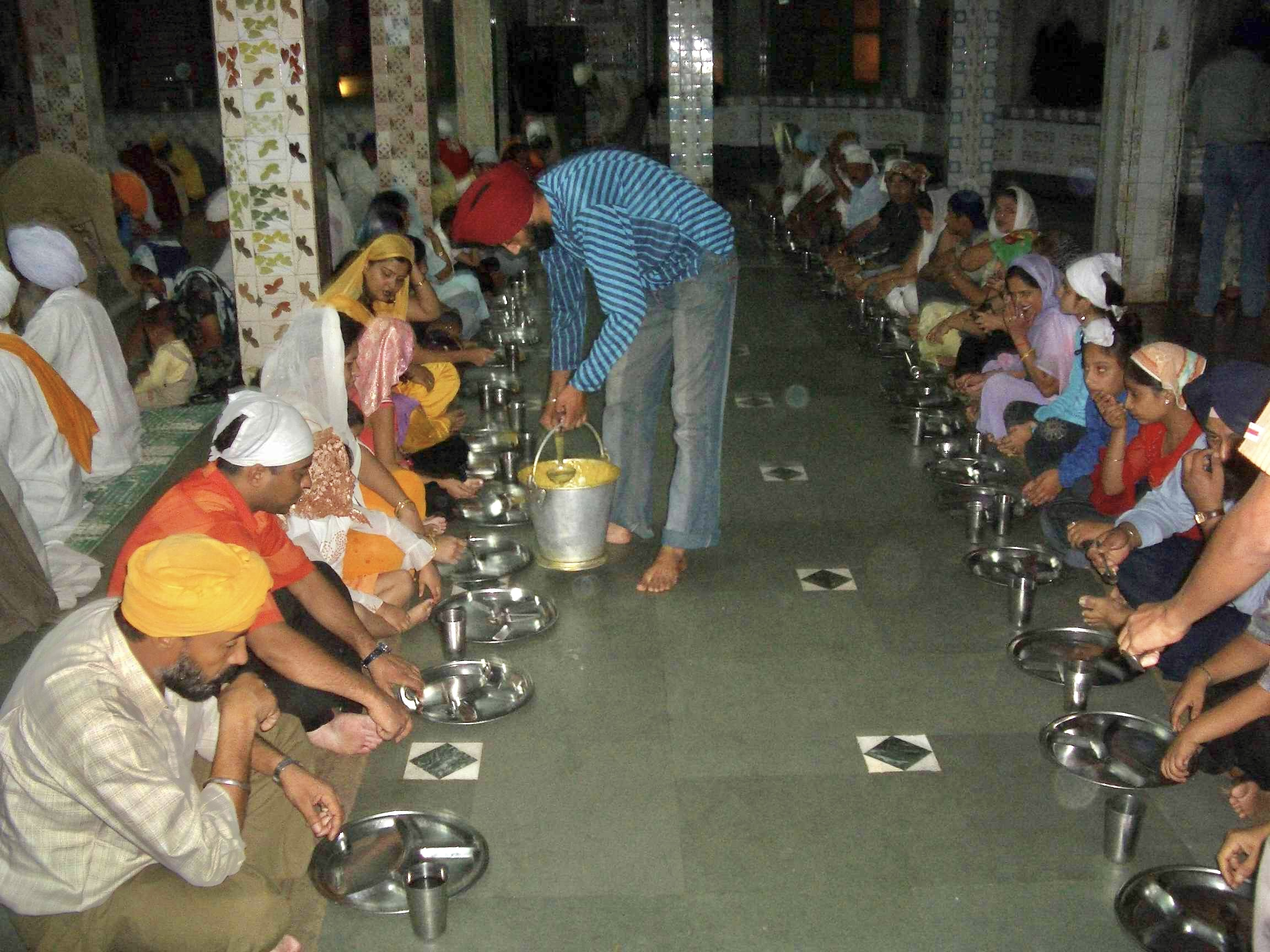
Traditional feeding (Langar) of visitors at Manikaran

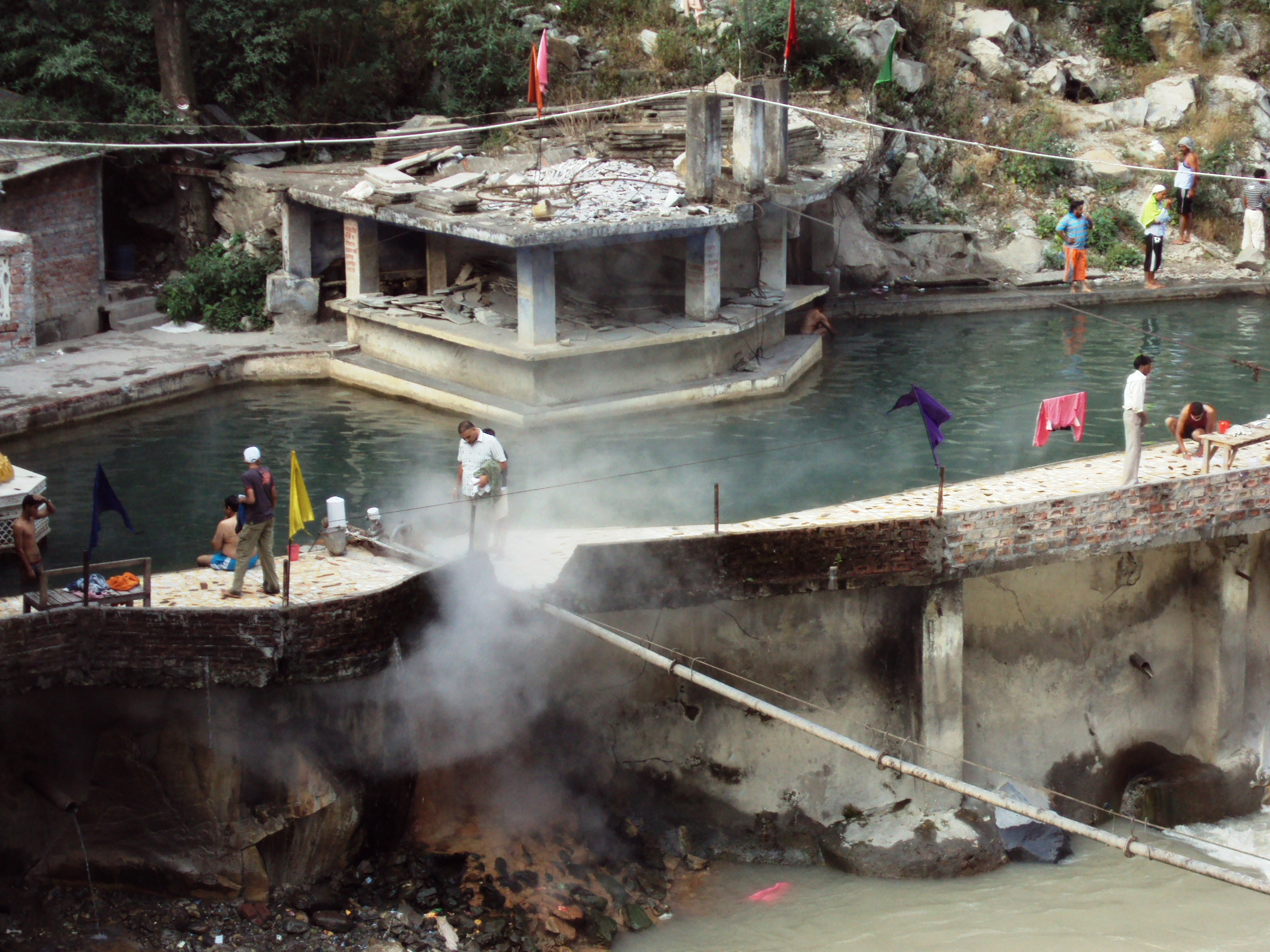
Tourists and pilgrims having a bath in a hot spring

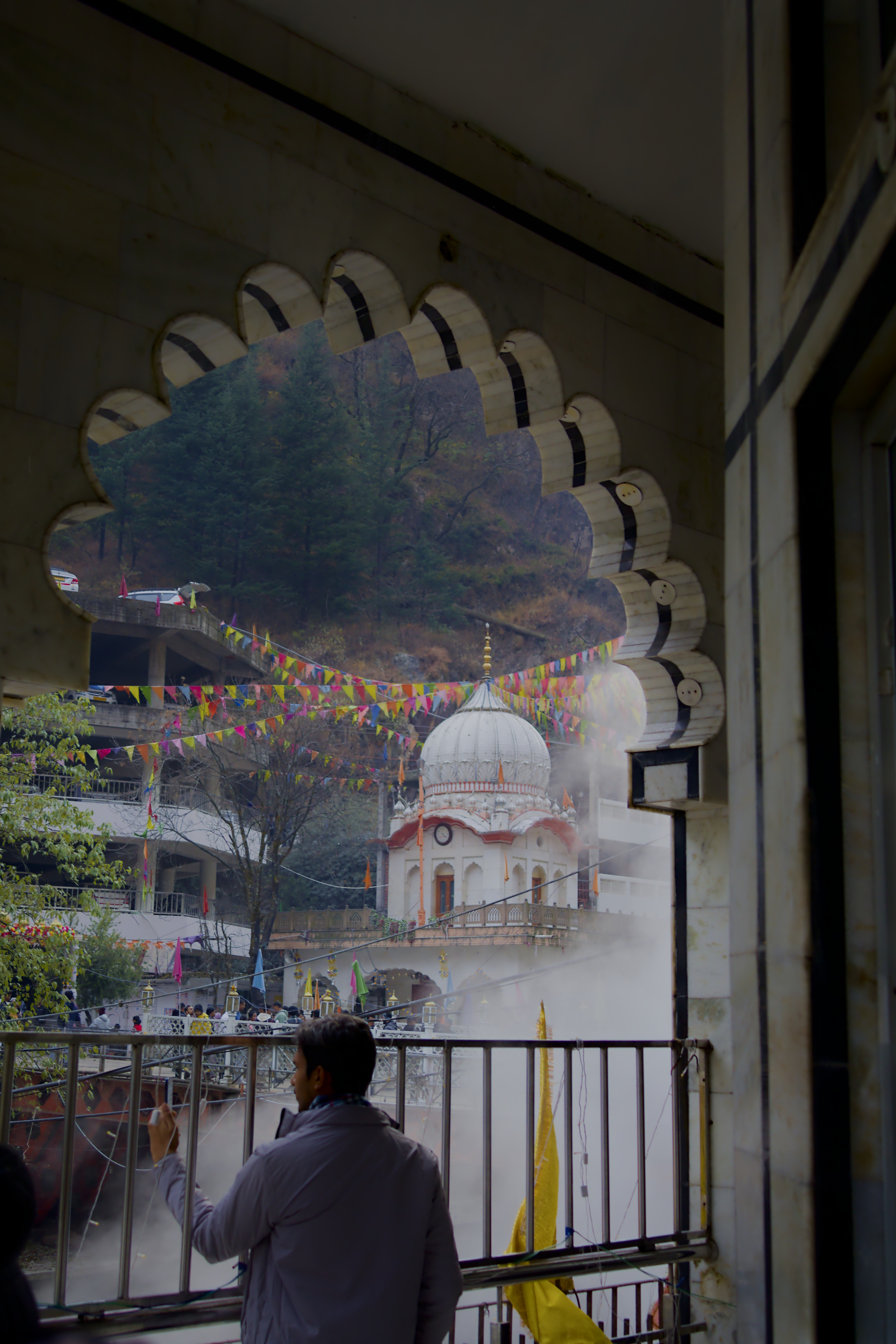
Manikaran viewed from Shiva temple

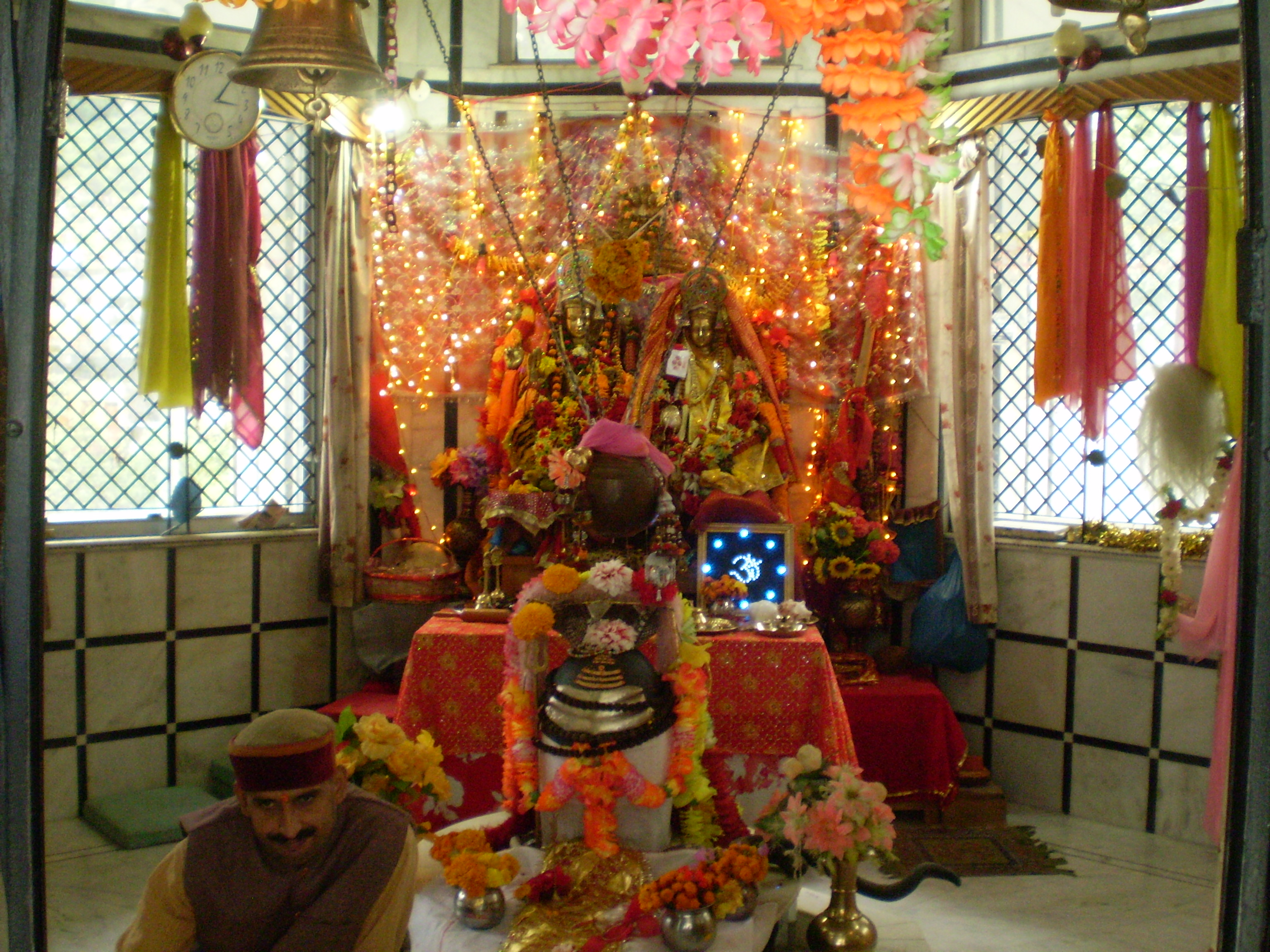
Shiv Parvati Temple at Manikaran

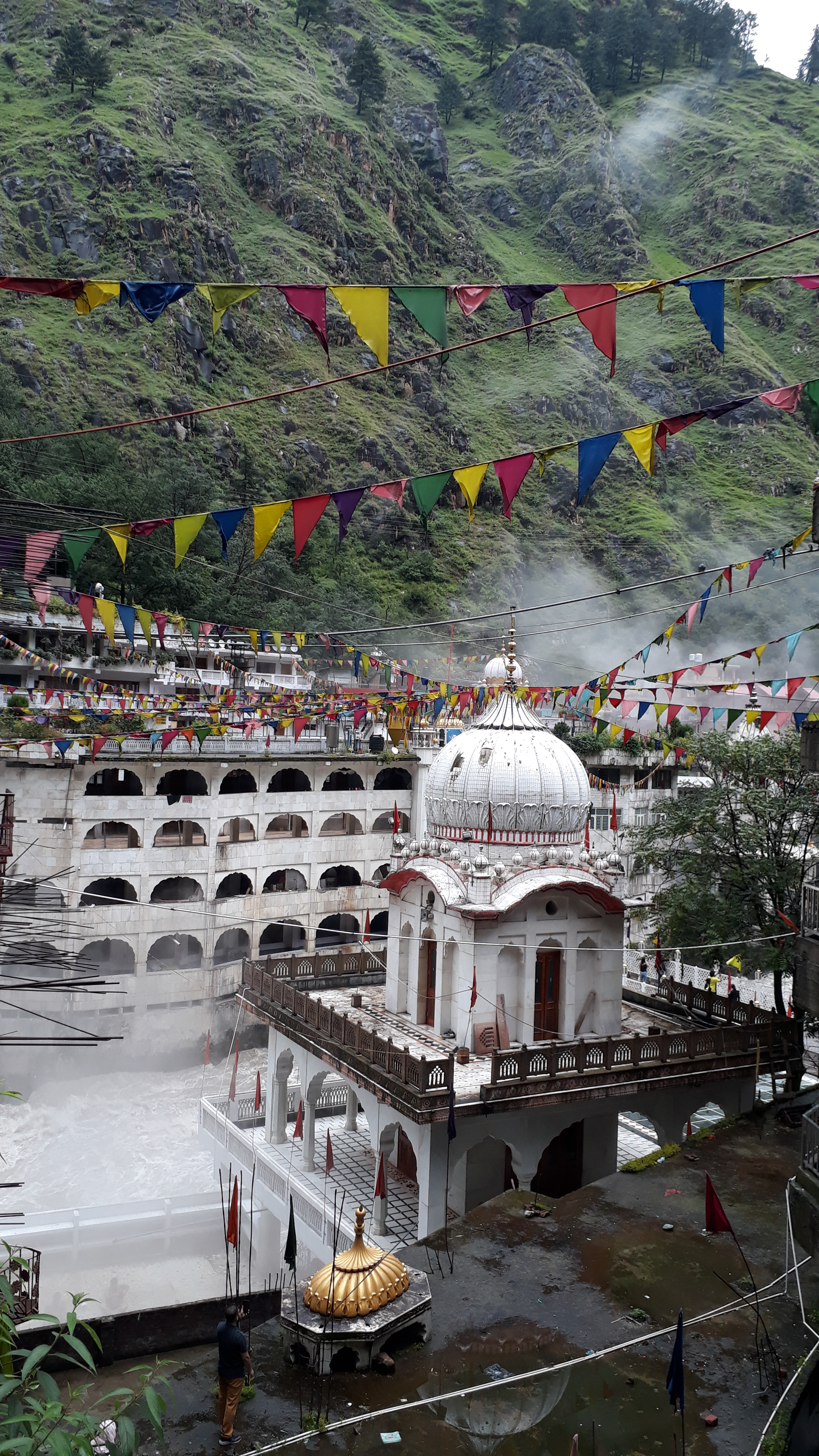
Outer view of Manikaran Gurdwara
