= Y. Ramavaram mandal =

Yarlagadda Ramavaram mandal Y. Ramavaram mandal
- Mandal
- Interactive map outlining mandal
- Country: India
- State: Andhra Pradesh
- District: Polavaram
- Population according to 2011 census: 28,614
- Number of villages: 137
- Area in Sq Km: 773.23
- Time zone: UTC+5:30 (IST)

Yarlagadda Ramavaram mandal, commonly known as Y. Ramavaram mandal, is one of the 12 mandals in Polavaram district of Andhra Pradesh. As per census 2011, there are 137 villages in this mandal.

== Demographics ==
Yarlagadda Ramavaram mandal has a total population of 28,614 as per the 2011 census, out of which 13,757 are males while 14,857 are females. The average sex ratio of Yarlagadda Ramavaram mandal is 1080. The total literacy rate of the mandal is 44%.

== Villages ==
List of villages in Yarlagadda Ramavaram mandal.

- Adupulametta
- Allurigedda
- Ammapeta
- Annampalem
- Antilova
- Babbilova
- Bachaluru
- Bandigedda
- Bheemudugadda
- Boddagondi
- Boddagunta
- Boddapalle
- Boddumamidi
- Bullojupalem
- Buradakota
- Buradavalasa
- Buruguwada
- Busikota
- Chamagedda
- Chanaganuru
- Chaparai
- Chavitidibbalu
- Chendurthi
- Chilakaveedhilanka
- Chinavulempadu
- Chinta Koyya
- Chinthakarrapalem
- Chinthalapudi
- D Mamidivada
- Dabbamamidi
- Dadalikavada
- Dalipadu
- Daragedda
- Daralova
- Devaramadugula
- Donarai
- Donkarai
- Doragondi
- Dorawada
- Dubela
- Dumpavalasa
- Edlakonda
- G Vattigedda
- Gandempalle
- Ganganuru
- Gannavaram
- Gellavada
- Gobbilapanukulu
- Godugurayi
- Gondikota
- Goppulathotamamidi
- Goramanda
- Gummarapalem
- Gurtedu
- Irlavada
- Jajigedda
- Jajivalasa
- Jalagalova
- Jangalathota
- K Yerragonda
- Kadarikota
- Kakkonda
- Kallepugonda
- Kanatalabanda
- Kanivada
- Kappalabanda
- Karnikota
- Kathirala
- Kokitagondi
- Komaravaram
- Koppulakota
- Koramatigondi
- Kota
- Kotabandichippalamamidi
- Kothakota
- Kothapakalu
- Kunkumamidi
- Lingavaram
- Mangampadu
- Marriguda
- Mulasalapalem
- Munagalapudi
- Muvvalavada
- Nagalova
- Nakkalapadu
- Nakkarathipalem
- Neelapalem
- Nellikota
- Nulakamamidi
- Nuvvugantipalem
- P Yerragonda
- Paidiputta
- Palagondi
- Panasalapalem
- Panasalova
- Panchadaralanka
- Pasaruginne
- Pathakota
- Pedavulempadu
- Perikivalasa
- Polamanugondi
- Poolova
- Pulimetala
- Pulusumamidi
- Putikunta
- Puttagandi
- Puttapalle
- Rachapalem
- Rakota
- Ramulakonda
- Ratsavalasa
- Ravvagadda
- Regadipalem
- Revadikota
- Sesharai
- Simhadripalem
- Singanakota
- Singavaram
- Sirimetla
- Thadikota
- Thangedukota
- Totakurapalem
- Tulusuru
- Tumikelapadu
- Vadisalova
- Vanamamidigondi
- Vattigedda
- Vedullapalle
- Veerampalem
- Vejuvada
- Villarti
- Vootlabanda
- Y Ramavaram
- Yarlagadda
- Yerragoppula
- Yerramreddipalem

== See also ==
- List of mandals in Andhra Pradesh
