= Rampachodavaram revenue division =

Coordinates: 17.43889°N 81.77667°E

- Revenue division in Polavaram district
- Interactive map of Rampachodavaram revenue division
- Country: India
- State: Andhra Pradesh
- District: Polavaram district

Rampachodavaram revenue division (or Rampachodavaram division) is an administrative division in the Polavaram district of the Indian state of Andhra Pradesh. It is one of the two revenue divisions in the district, and has eight mandals under its administration. Rampachodavaram is the divisional headquarters.

== History ==
Rampachodavaram revenue division was part of East Godavari district, before the districts were reorganised in 2022.

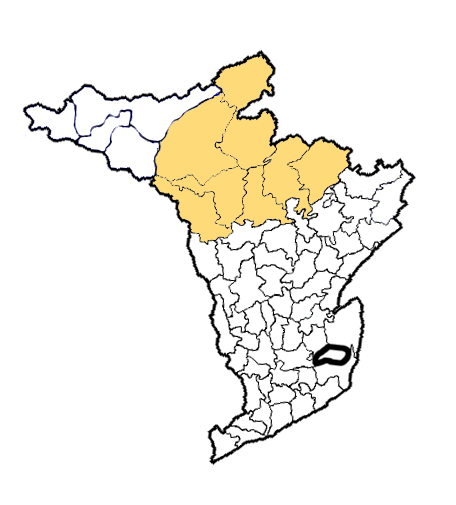
Rampachodavaram revenue division in erstwhile East Godavari district

The current organisation of Rampachodavaram revenue division came into effect on December 31, 2025.

== Administration ==
There are 8 mandals in Rampachodavaram revenue division.

No.	Mandals
1	Rampachodavaram mandal
2	Devipatnam mandal
3	Y. Ramavaram mandal
4	Gurtedu mandal
5	Addateegala mandal
6	Gangavaram mandal
7	Maredumilli mandal
8	Rajavommangi mandal

== See also ==
- List of revenue divisions in Andhra Pradesh
- List of mandals in Andhra Pradesh
