= Thoyyeru =

- village
- Interactive map of Thoyyeru
- Location in Andhra Pradesh, India Thoyyeru (India)
- Coordinates: 17.3210°N 81.6800°E
- Country: India
- State: Andhra Pradesh
- District: Polavaram

Area
  - Total: 11 km^{2} (4.2 sq mi)

Population (2011)
  - Total: 1,739
  - Density: 153/km^{2} (400/sq mi)

Languages
  - Official: Telugu
- Time zone: UTC+5:30 (IST)
- Postal code: 533 446

Thoyyeru is a village in Devipatnam Mandal, Polavaram district in the state of Andhra Pradesh in India.

== Geography ==
Thoyyeru is located at 17.3210°N 81.6800°E.

== Demographics ==
As of 2011 India census, Thoyyeru had a population of 1739, out of which 848 were male and 891 were female. The population of children below 6 years of age was 11%. The literacy rate of the village was 68%.
