= K. Yerragonda =

- village
- Interactive map of K. Yerragonda
- Location in Andhra Pradesh, India K. Yerragonda (India)
- Coordinates: 17.5297°N 81.9356°E
- Country: India
- State: Andhra Pradesh
- District: Polavaram

Area
  - Total: 0.97 km^{2} (0.37 sq mi)

Population (2011)
  - Total: 243
  - Density: 251/km^{2} (650/sq mi)

Languages
  - Official: Telugu
- Time zone: UTC+5:30 (IST)

K. Yerragonda is a village in Y. Ramavaram Mandal, Polavaram district in the state of Andhra Pradesh in India. It is located 82 km from Kakinada and 428 km from State capital Hyderabad.

== Demographics ==
As of 2011 India census, This Village had a population of 243, out of which 127 were male and 116 were female. Population of children below 6 years of age were 13%. The literacy rate of the village is 42%.
