= Kappalabanda =

- village
- Interactive map of Kappalabanda
- Location in Andhra Pradesh, India Kappalabanda (India)
- Coordinates: 17.6309°N 82.0037°E
- Country: India
- State: Andhra Pradesh
- District: Polavaram

Area
  - Total: 0.12 km^{2} (0.046 sq mi)

Population (2011)
  - Total: 19
  - Density: 158/km^{2} (410/sq mi)

Languages
  - Official: Telugu
- Time zone: UTC+5:30 (IST)

Kappalabanda is a village in Y. Ramavaram Mandal, Polavaram district in the state of Andhra Pradesh in India.

== Demographics ==
As of 2011 India census, This Village had a population of 19, out of which 11 were male and 8 were female. Population of children below 6 years of age were 11%. The literacy rate of the village is 29%.
