= Vatangi =

- village
- Interactive map of Vatangi
- Location in Andhra Pradesh, India Vatangi (India)
- Coordinates: 17.4310°N 82.2469°E
- Country: India
- State: Andhra Pradesh
- District: Polavaram

Area
  - Total: 5 km^{2} (1.9 sq mi)

Population (2011)
  - Total: 715
  - Density: 150/km^{2} (390/sq mi)

Languages
  - Official: Telugu
- Time zone: UTC+5:30 (IST)
- Postal code: 533 446

Vatangi is a village in Rajavommangi Mandal, Polavaram district in the state of Andhra Pradesh in India.

== Geography ==
Vatangi is located at 17.4310°N 82.2469°E.

== Demographics ==
As of 2011 India census, Vatangi had a population of 715, out of which 346 were male and 369 were female. The population of children below 6 years of age was 8%. The literacy rate of the village was 52%.
