= Chendurthi =

- village
- Interactive map of Chendurthi
- Location in Andhra Pradesh, India Chendurthi (India)
- Coordinates: 17°35′03″N 81°55′49″E
- Country: India
- State: Andhra Pradesh
- District: Polavaram

Area
  - Total: 1.02 km^{2} (0.39 sq mi)

Population (2011)
  - Total: 66
  - Density: 65/km^{2} (170/sq mi)

Languages
  - Official: Telugu
- Time zone: UTC+5:30 (IST)

Chendurthi is a village in Y. Ramavaram mandal , Polavaram district, in the state of Andhra Pradesh, India.

== Demographics ==
As of 2011 India census, This Village had a population of 66, out of which 39 were male and 27 were female. Population of children below 6 years of age were 14%. The literacy rate of the village is 42%.
