= Babbilova =

- village
- Interactive map of Babbilova
- Location in Andhra Pradesh, India Babbilova (India)
- Coordinates: 17°48′48″N 81°53′24″E
- Country: India
- State: Andhra Pradesh
- District: Polavaram
- Mandal: Y. Ramavaram

Area
  - Total: 0.12 km^{2} (0.046 sq mi)

Population (2011)
  - Total: 97
  - Density: 4,850/km^{2} (12,600/sq mi)

Languages
  - Official: Telugu
- Time zone: UTC+5:30 (IST)

Babbilova is a village in Y. Ramavaram Mandal, Polavaram district in the state of Andhra Pradesh in India.

== Demographics ==
As of 2011 India census, This Village had a population of 97, out of which 53 were male and 44 were female. Population of children below 6 years of age were 19%. The literacy rate of the village is 30%.
