= Bachaluru =

- village
- Interactive map of Bachaluru
- Location in Andhra Pradesh, India Bachaluru (India)
- Coordinates: 17.9176°N 82.9385°E
- Country: India
- State: Andhra Pradesh
- District: Alluri Sitharama Raju

Area
  - Total: 0.18 km^{2} (0.069 sq mi)

Population (2011)
  - Total: 463
  - Density: 2,572/km^{2} (6,660/sq mi)

Languages
  - Official: Telugu
- Time zone: UTC+5:30 (IST)
- Postal code: 533348

Bachaluru is a village in Donkarayi Taluk, in Polavaram district in the state of Andhra Pradesh in India.

== Demographics ==
As of 2011 India census, This Village had a population of 463, out of which 224 were male and 239 were female. Population of children below 6 years of age were 21%. The literacy rate of the village is 30%.
