= Komarapuram =

- village
- Interactive map of Komarapuram
- Location in Andhra Pradesh, India Komarapuram (India)
- Coordinates: 17.4453°N 82.2024°E
- Country: India
- State: Andhra Pradesh
- District: Polavaram

Area
  - Total: 4 km^{2} (1.5 sq mi)

Population (2011)
  - Total: 352
  - Density: 95/km^{2} (250/sq mi)

Languages
  - Official: Telugu
- Time zone: UTC+5:30 (IST)
- Postal code: 533 446

Komarapuram is a village in Rajavommangi Mandal, Polavaram district in the state of Andhra Pradesh in India.

== Geography ==
Komarapuram is located at 17.4453°N 82.2024°E.

== Demographics ==
As of 2011 India census, Komarapuram had a population of 352, out of which 169 were male and 183 were female. The population of children below 6 years of age was 13%. The literacy rate of the village was 38%.
