= Kondamodalu =

- village
- Interactive map of Kondamodalu
- Location in Andhra Pradesh, India Kondamodalu (India)
- Coordinates: 17.4605°N 81.5579°E
- Country: India
- State: Andhra Pradesh
- District: Polavaram

Area
  - Total: 3 km^{2} (1.2 sq mi)

Population (2011)
  - Total: 2,039
  - Density: 781/km^{2} (2,020/sq mi)

Languages
  - Official: Telugu
- Time zone: UTC+5:30 (IST)
- Postal code: 533 446

Kondamodalu is a village in Devipatnam Mandal, Polavaram district in the state of Andhra Pradesh in India.

== Geography ==
Kondamodalu is located at 17.4605°N 81.5579°E.

== Demographics ==
As of 2011 India census, Kondamodalu had a population of 2039, out of which 959 were male and 1080 were female. The population of children below 6 years of age was 13%. The literacy rate of the village was 47%.
