= Godugurayi =

- village
- Interactive map of Godugurayi
- Location in Andhra Pradesh, India Godugurayi (India)
- Coordinates: 17.5441°N 82.0030°E
- Country: India
- State: Andhra Pradesh
- District: Polavaram

Area
  - Total: 1.02 km^{2} (0.39 sq mi)

Population (2011)
  - Total: 223
  - Density: 219/km^{2} (570/sq mi)

Languages
  - Official: Telugu
- Time zone: UTC+5:30 (IST)

Godugurayi is a village in Y. Ramavaram Mandal, Polavaram district in the state of Andhra Pradesh in India.

== Demographics ==
At the 2011 Indian census, the village had a population of 223, of which 105 were male and 118 were female, and 17% were below 6 years of age. The literacy rate of the village is 46%.
