= Munagalapudi =

- village
- Interactive map of Munagalapudi
- Location in Andhra Pradesh, India Munagalapudi (India)
- Coordinates: 17.5910°N 81.9215°E
- Country: India
- State: Andhra Pradesh
- District: Polavaram

Area
  - Total: 1.61 km^{2} (0.62 sq mi)

Population (2011)
  - Total: 88
  - Density: 55/km^{2} (140/sq mi)

Languages
  - Official: Telugu
- Time zone: UTC+5:30 (IST)

Munagalapudi is a village in Y. Ramavaram Mandal, Polavaram district in the state of Andhra Pradesh in India.

== Demographics ==
As of 2011 India census, This Village had a population of 88, out of which 44 were male and 44 were female. Population of children below 6 years of age were 14%. The literacy rate of the village is 38%.
