= Kunkumamidi =

- village
- Interactive map of Kunkumamidi
- Location in Andhra Pradesh, India Kunkumamidi (India)
- Coordinates: 17.6625°N 81.8500°E
- Country: India
- State: Andhra Pradesh
- District: Polavaram

Area
  - Total: 0.07 km^{2} (0.027 sq mi)

Population (2011)
  - Total: 32
  - Density: 457/km^{2} (1,180/sq mi)

Languages
  - Official: Telugu
- Time zone: UTC+5:30 (IST)

Kunkumamidi is a village in Y. Ramavaram Mandal, Polavaram district in the state of Andhra Pradesh in India.

== Demographics ==
As of 2011 India census, This Village had a population of 32, out of which 17 were male and 15 were female. Population of children below 6 years of age were 22%. The literacy rate of the village is 52%.
