= Bandigedda =

- village
- Interactive map of Bandigedda
- Location in Andhra Pradesh, India Bandigedda (India)
- Coordinates: 17.6234°N 81.9657°E
- Country: India
- State: Andhra Pradesh
- District: Polavaram
- Mandal: Y. Ramavaram

Area
  - Total: 1.25 km^{2} (0.48 sq mi)

Population (2011)
  - Total: 207
  - Density: 166/km^{2} (430/sq mi)

Languages
  - Official: Telugu
- Time zone: UTC+5:30 (IST)

Bandigedda is a village in Y. Ramavaram Mandal, Polavaram district in the state of Andhra Pradesh in India.

== Demographics ==
As of 2011 India census, This Village had a population of 207, out of which 143 were male and 64 were female. Population of children below 6 years of age were 6%. The literacy rate of the village is 65%.
