= Vanchangi =

- village
- Interactive map of Vanchangi
- Location in Andhra Pradesh, India Vanchangi (India)
- Coordinates: 17°23′49″N 82°12′10″E
- Country: India
- State: Andhra Pradesh
- District: Polavaram

Area
  - Total: 3 km^{2} (1.2 sq mi)

Population (2011)
  - Total: 450
  - Density: 132/km^{2} (340/sq mi)

Languages
  - Official: Telugu
- Time zone: UTC+5:30 (IST)
- Postal code: 533 446

Vanchangi is a village in Rajavommangi Mandal, Polavaram district in the state of Andhra Pradesh in India.

== Geography ==
Vanchangi is located at 17.3727°N 82.1883°E.

== Demographics ==
As of 2011 India census, Vanchangi had a population of 450, out of which 233 were male and 227 were female. The population of children below 6 years of age was 11%. The literacy rate of the village was 37%.
