= Devaramadugula =

- village
- Interactive map of Devaramadugula
- Location in Andhra Pradesh, India Devaramadugula (India)
- Coordinates: 17.5584°N 82.0085°E
- Country: India
- State: Andhra Pradesh
- District: Polavaram

Area
  - Total: 1.28 km^{2} (0.49 sq mi)

Population (2011)
  - Total: 591
  - Density: 462/km^{2} (1,200/sq mi)

Languages
  - Official: Telugu
- Time zone: UTC+5:30 (IST)

Devaramadugula is a village in Y. Ramavaram Mandal, Polavaram district in the state of Andhra Pradesh in India.

== Demographics ==
As of the 2011 India census, the village had a population of 591, out of which 331 were male and 260 were female. Nine percent of the population consisted of children below 6 years of age. The literacy rate of the village is 49%.
