= Annampalem =

- village
- Interactive map of Annampalem
- Location in Andhra Pradesh, India Annampalem (India)
- Coordinates: 17.5684°N 81.9308°E
- Country: India
- State: Andhra Pradesh
- District: Polavaram
- Mandal: Y. Ramavaram

Area
  - Total: 0.66 km^{2} (0.25 sq mi)

Population (2011)
  - Total: 40
  - Density: 61/km^{2} (160/sq mi)

Languages
  - Official: Telugu
- Time zone: UTC+5:30 (IST)

Annampalem is a village in Y. Ramavaram Mandal, Polavaram district in the state of Andhra Pradesh in India.

== Demographics ==
As of 2011 India census, This Village had a population of 40, out of which 22 were male and 18 were female. Population of children below 6 years of age were 5%. The literacy rate of the village is 37%.
