= Donelapalem =

Village in Andhra Pradesh, India

- village
- Interactive map of Donelapalem
- Location in Andhra Pradesh, India Donelapalem (India)
- Coordinates: 17.4851°N 82.1090°E
- Country: India
- State: Andhra Pradesh
- District: Polavaram

Area
  - Total: 2 km^{2} (0.77 sq mi)

Population (2011)
  - Total: 545
  - Density: 230/km^{2} (600/sq mi)

Languages
  - Official: Telugu
- Time zone: UTC+5:30 (IST)
- Postal code: 533 446

Donelapalem is a village in Rajavommangi Mandal, Polavaram district in the state of Andhra Pradesh in India.

== Geography ==
Donelapalem is located at 17.4851°N 82.1090°E.

== Demographics ==
As of 2011 India census, Donelapalem had a population of 545, out of which 273 were male and 272 were female. The population of children below 6 years of age was 6%. The literacy rate of the village was 49%.
