= Rajavommangi =

Coordinates: 17°33′N 82°14′E

- Village
- Interactive map of Rajavommangi
- Location in Andhra Pradesh, India
- Country: India
- State: Andhra Pradesh
- District: Polavaram
- Mandal: Rajavommangi

Area (mandal)
  - Total: 465.41 km^{2} (179.70 sq mi)

Languages
  - Official: Telugu
- Time zone: UTC+5:30 (IST)
- Vehicle Registration: AP05 (Former); AP39 (from 30 January 2019)

Rajavommangi is a village in Polavaram district in the state of Andhra Pradesh in India. It is the mandal headquarters of Rajavommangi mandal.
