= Lagarayi =

- village
- Interactive map of Lagarayi
- Location in Andhra Pradesh, India Lagarayi (India)
- Coordinates: 17°34′30″N 82°11′38″E
- Country: India
- State: Andhra Pradesh
- District: Polavaram

Area
  - Total: 7 km^{2} (2.7 sq mi)

Population (2011)
  - Total: 1,551
  - Density: 219/km^{2} (570/sq mi)

Languages
  - Official: Telugu
- Time zone: UTC+5:30 (IST)
- Postal code: 533 446

Lagarayi is a village in Rajavommangi Mandal, Polavaram district in the state of Andhra Pradesh in India.

== Geography ==
Lagarayi is located at 17.5544°N 82.2027°E.

== Demographics ==
As of 2011 India census, Lagarayi had a population of 1551, out of which 771 were male and 780 were female. The population of children below 6 years of age was 9%. The literacy rate of the village was 63%.
