= Bornagudem =

Village in Andhra Pradesh, India

- village
- Interactive map of Bornagudem
- Location in Andhra Pradesh, India Bornagudem (India)
- Coordinates: 17°25′35″N 82°07′17″E
- Country: India
- State: Andhra Pradesh
- District: Polavaram
- Mandal: Rajavommangi

Area
  - Total: 2 km^{2} (0.77 sq mi)

Population (2011)
  - Total: 513
  - Density: 266/km^{2} (690/sq mi)

Languages
  - Official: Telugu
- Time zone: UTC+5:30 (IST)
- Postal code: 533 446

Bornagudem is a village in Rajavommangi Mandal, Polavaram district in the state of Andhra Pradesh in India.

== Geography ==
Bornagudem is located at 17.4050°N 81.8198°E.

== Demographics ==
As of 2011 India census, Bornagudem had a population of 513, out of which 357 were male and 156 were female. The population of children below 6 years of age was 4%. The literacy rate of the village was 78%.
