= Dalipadu =

Village in Andhra Pradesh, India

- village
- Interactive map of Dalipadu
- Location in Andhra Pradesh, India Dalipadu (India)
- Coordinates: 17.5436°N 81.9795°E
- Country: India
- State: Andhra Pradesh
- District: Polavaram

Area
  - Total: 1.09 km^{2} (0.42 sq mi)

Population (2011)
  - Total: 492
  - Density: 451/km^{2} (1,170/sq mi)

Languages
  - Official: Telugu
- Time zone: UTC+5:30 (IST)

Dalipadu is a village in Y. Ramavaram Mandal, Polavaram district in the state of Andhra Pradesh in India.

== Demographics ==
As of 2011 India census, the village had a population of 492, of whom 200 were male and 292 were female. Population of children below 6 years of age were 10%. The literacy rate of the village was 49%.
