= Badadanampalle =

Village in Andhra Pradesh, India

- village
- Interactive map of Badadanampalle
- Location in Andhra Pradesh, India Badadanampalle (India)
- Coordinates: 17°35′03″N 82°16′07″E
- Country: India
- State: Andhra Pradesh
- District: Polavaram
- Mandal: Rajavommangi

Area
  - Total: 2 km^{2} (0.77 sq mi)

Population (2011)
  - Total: 549
  - Density: 231/km^{2} (600/sq mi)

Languages
  - Official: Telugu
- Time zone: UTC+5:30 (IST)
- Postal code: 533 446

Badadanampalle is a village in Rajavommangi Mandal, Polavaram district in the state of Andhra Pradesh in India.

== Geography ==
Badadanampalle is located at 17.5580°N 82.2582°E.

== Demographics ==
As of 2011 India census, Badadanampalle had a population of 549, out of which 279 were male and 270 were female. The population of children below 6 years of age was 10%. The literacy rate of the village was 55%.
