= Indukuru =

- village
- Interactive map of Indukuru
- Location in Andhra Pradesh, India Indukuru (India)
- Coordinates: 17.2584°N 81.7971°E
- Country: India
- State: Andhra Pradesh
- District: Polavaram

Area
  - Total: 14 km^{2} (5.4 sq mi)

Population (2011)
  - Total: 2,025
  - Density: 146/km^{2} (380/sq mi)

Languages
  - Official: Telugu
- Time zone: UTC+5:30 (IST)
- Postal code: 533 446

Indukuru is a village in Devipatnam Mandal, Polavaram district in the state of Andhra Pradesh in India.

== Geography ==
Indukuru is located at 17.2584°N 81.7971°E.

== Demographics ==
As of 2011 India census, Indukuru had a population of 2025, out of which 975 were male and 1050 were female. The population of children below 6 years of age was 11%. The literacy rate of the village was 62%.
