= Pasaruginne =

- village
- Interactive map of Pasaruginne
- Location in Andhra Pradesh, India Pasaruginne (India)
- Coordinates: 17.6052°N 81.9424°E
- Country: India
- State: Andhra Pradesh
- District: Polavaram

Area
  - Total: 0.72 km^{2} (0.28 sq mi)

Population (2011)
  - Total: 134
  - Density: 186/km^{2} (480/sq mi)

Languages
  - Official: Telugu
- Time zone: UTC+5:30 (IST)

Pasaruginne is a village in Y. Ramavaram Mandal, Polavaram district in the state of Andhra Pradesh in India.

== Demographics ==
As of 2011 India census, This Village had a population of 134, out of which 62 were male and 72 were female. Population of children below 6 years of age were 10%. The literacy rate of the village is 43%.
