= Chavitidibbalu =

- village
- Interactive map of Chavitidibbalu
- Location in Andhra Pradesh, India Chavitidibbalu (India)
- Coordinates: 17.5589°N 81.9954°E
- Country: India
- State: Andhra Pradesh
- District: Polavaram

Area
  - Total: 3.08 km^{2} (1.19 sq mi)

Population (2011)
  - Total: 660
  - Density: 214/km^{2} (550/sq mi)

Languages
  - Official: Telugu
- Time zone: UTC+5:30 (IST)

Chavitidibbalu is a village in Y. Ramavaram Mandal, Polavaram district in the state of Andhra Pradesh in India.

== Demographics ==
As of 2011 India census, This Village had a population of 660, out of which 323 were male and 337 were female. Population of children below 6 years of age were 12%. The literacy rate of the village is 52%.
