= Dadalikavada =

- village
- Interactive map of Dadalikavada
- Location in Andhra Pradesh, India Dadalikavada (India)
- Coordinates: 17.6665°N 82.0133°E
- Country: India
- State: Andhra Pradesh
- District: Polavaram

Area
  - Total: 1.27 km^{2} (0.49 sq mi)

Population (2011)
  - Total: 161
  - Density: 127/km^{2} (330/sq mi)

Languages
  - Official: Telugu
- Time zone: UTC+5:30 (IST)

Dadalikavada is a village in Y. Ramavaram Mandal, Polavaram district in the state of Andhra Pradesh in India.

== Demographics ==
As of 2011 India census, This Village had a population of 161, out of which 86 were male and 75 were female. Population of children below 6 years of age were 7%. The literacy rate of the village is 43%.
