= Pedavulempadu =

- village
- Interactive map of Pedavulempadu
- Location in Andhra Pradesh, India Pedavulempadu (India)
- Coordinates: 17.5470°N 81.9484°E
- Country: India
- State: Andhra Pradesh
- District: Polavaram

Population (2011)
  - Total: 368

Languages
  - Official: Telugu
- Time zone: UTC+5:30 (IST)

Pedavulempadu is a village in Y. Ramavaram Mandal, Polavaram district in the state of Andhra Pradesh in India.

== Demographics ==
As of 2011 India census, This Village had a population of 368, out of which 174 were male and 194 were female. Population of children below 6 years of age were 9.78%. The literacy rate of the village is 1%.
