= Thantikonda, Rajavommangi Mandal =

Thantikonda
- village
- Interactive map of Thantikonda
- Location in Andhra Pradesh, India Thantikonda (India)
- Coordinates: 17.4925°N 82.1973°E
- Country: India
- State: Andhra Pradesh
- District: Polavaram

Area
  - Total: 4 km^{2} (1.5 sq mi)

Population (2011)
  - Total: 1,519
  - Density: 343/km^{2} (890/sq mi)

Languages
  - Official: Telugu
- Time zone: UTC+5:30 (IST)
- Postal code: 533 446

Thantikonda is a village in Rajavommangi Mandal, Polavaram district in the state of Andhra Pradesh in India.

== Geography ==
Thantikonda is located at 17.4925°N 82.1973°E.

== Demographics ==
As of 2011 India census, Thantikonda had a population of 1519, out of which 754 were male and 765 were female. The population of children below 6 years of age was 10%. The literacy rate of the village was 53%.
