= Donarai =

- village
- Interactive map of Donarai
- Location in Andhra Pradesh, India Donarai (India)
- Coordinates: 17.6287°N 81.8794°E
- Country: India
- State: Andhra Pradesh
- District: Polavaram

Area
  - Total: 0.47 km^{2} (0.18 sq mi)

Population (2011)
  - Total: 51
  - Density: 109/km^{2} (280/sq mi)

Languages
  - Official: Telugu
- Time zone: UTC+5:30 (IST)
- Postal code: 533348

Donarai is a village in Y. Ramavaram Mandal, Polavaram district in the state of Andhra Pradesh in India.

== Demographics ==
As of 2011 India census, This Village had a population of 51, out of which 24 were male and 27 were female. Population of children below 6 years of age were 12%. The literacy rate of the village is 4%.
