= Kokitagondi =

- village
- Interactive map of Kokitagondi
- Location in Andhra Pradesh, India Kokitagondi (India)
- Coordinates: 17.5953°N 81.9779°E
- Country: India
- State: Andhra Pradesh
- District: Polavaram

Area
  - Total: 0.49 km^{2} (0.19 sq mi)

Population (2011)
  - Total: 100
  - Density: 204/km^{2} (530/sq mi)

Languages
  - Official: Telugu
- Time zone: UTC+5:30 (IST)

Kokitagondi is a village in Y. Ramavaram Mandal, Polavaram district in the state of Andhra Pradesh in India.

== Demographics ==
As of 2011 India census, This Village had a population of 100, out of which 49 were male and 51 were female. Population of children below 6 years of age were 14%. The literacy rate of the village is 42%.
