= Karudevipalem =

Village in Andhra Pradesh, India

- village
- Interactive map of Karudevipalem
- Location in Andhra Pradesh, India Karudevipalem (India)
- Coordinates: 17.4097°N 82.1955°E
- Country: India
- State: Andhra Pradesh
- District: Polavaram

Area
  - Total: 4 km^{2} (1.5 sq mi)

Population (2011)
  - Total: 617
  - Density: 148/km^{2} (380/sq mi)

Languages
  - Official: Telugu
- Time zone: UTC+5:30 (IST)
- Postal code: 533 446

Karudevipalem is a village in Rajavommangi Mandal, Polavaram district in the state of Andhra Pradesh in India.

== Geography ==
Karudevipalem is located at 17.4097°N 82.1955°E.

== Demographics ==
As of 2011 India census, Karudevipalem had a population of 617, out of which 317 were male and 300 were female. The population of children below 6 years of age was 13%. The literacy rate of the village was 27%.
