= Chinthalapudi =

- village
- Interactive map of Chinthalapudi
- Location in Andhra Pradesh, India Chinthalapudi (India)
- Coordinates: 17.6079°N 81.8752°E
- Country: India
- State: Andhra Pradesh
- District: Polavaram

Area
  - Total: 1.9 km^{2} (0.73 sq mi)

Population (2011)
  - Total: 326
  - Density: 172/km^{2} (450/sq mi)

Languages
  - Official: Telugu
- Time zone: UTC+5:30 (IST)

Chinthalapudi is a village in Y. Ramavaram Mandal, Polavaram district in the state of Andhra Pradesh in India.

== Demographics ==
As of 2011 India census, This Village had a population of 326, out of which 191 were male and 135 were female. Population of children below 6 years of age were 15%. The literacy rate of the village is 61%.
