= Goramanda =

- village
- Interactive map of Goramanda
- Location in Andhra Pradesh, India Goramanda (India)
- Coordinates: 17.6637°N 81.9435°E
- Country: India
- State: Andhra Pradesh
- District: Polavaram

Area
  - Total: 1.13 km^{2} (0.44 sq mi)

Population (2011)
  - Total: 80
  - Density: 71/km^{2} (180/sq mi)

Languages
  - Official: Telugu
- Time zone: UTC+5:30 (IST)

Goramanda is a village in Y. Ramavaram Mandal, Polavaram district in the state of Andhra Pradesh in India.

== Demographics ==
As of 2011 India census, This Village had a population of 80, out of which 41 were male and 39 were female. Population of children below 6 years of age were 20%. The literacy rate of the village is 19%.
