= Chikilinta =

- village
- Interactive map of Chikilinta
- Location in Andhra Pradesh, India Chikilinta (India)
- Coordinates: 17°26′35″N 82°13′35″E
- Country: India
- State: Andhra Pradesh
- District: Polavaram

Area
  - Total: 6 km^{2} (2.3 sq mi)

Population (2011)
  - Total: 877
  - Density: 146/km^{2} (380/sq mi)

Languages
  - Official: Telugu
- Time zone: UTC+5:30 (IST)
- Postal code: 533 446

Chikilinta is a village in Rajavommangi Mandal, Polavaram district in the state of Andhra Pradesh in India.

== Geography ==
Chikilinta is located at 17.4246°N 82.1983°E.

== Demographics ==
As of 2011 India census, Chikilinta had a population of 877, out of which 454 were male and 423 were female. The population of children below 6 years of age was 13%. The literacy rate of the village was 44%.
