= Boddapalle =

- village
- Interactive map of Boddapalle
- Location in Andhra Pradesh, India Boddapalle (India)
- Coordinates: 17.5040°N 81.9330°E
- Country: India
- State: Andhra Pradesh
- District: Polavaram
- Mandal: Y. Ramavaram

Area
  - Total: 0.37 km^{2} (0.14 sq mi)

Population (2011)
  - Total: 177
  - Density: 478/km^{2} (1,240/sq mi)

Languages
  - Official: Telugu
- Time zone: UTC+5:30 (IST)

Boddapalle is a village in Y. Ramavaram Mandal, Polavaram district in the state of Andhra Pradesh in India.

== Demographics ==
As of 2011 India census, This Village had a population of 177, out of which 96 were male and 81 were female. Population of children below 6 years of age were 7%. The literacy rate of the village is 48%.
