= Muvvalavada =

- village
- Interactive map of Muvvalavada
- Location in Andhra Pradesh, India Muvvalavada (India)
- Coordinates: 17.5900°N 81.9949°E
- Country: India
- State: Andhra Pradesh
- District: Polavaram

Area
  - Total: 0.55 km^{2} (0.21 sq mi)

Population (2011)
  - Total: 56
  - Density: 102/km^{2} (260/sq mi)

Languages
  - Official: Telugu
- Time zone: UTC+5:30 (IST)

Muvvalavada is a village in Y. Ramavaram Mandal, Polavaram district in the state of Andhra Pradesh in India.

== Demographics ==
As of 2011 India census, This Village had a population of 56, out of which 27 were male and 29 were female. Population of children below 6 years of age were 16%. The literacy rate of the village is 26%.
