= Labbarthi =

- village
- Interactive map of Labbarthi
- Location in Andhra Pradesh, India Labbarthi (India)
- Coordinates: 17.5383°N 82.1755°E
- Country: India
- State: Andhra Pradesh
- District: Polavaram

Area
  - Total: 4 km^{2} (1.5 sq mi)

Population (2011)
  - Total: 1,780
  - Density: 482/km^{2} (1,250/sq mi)

Languages
  - Official: Telugu
- Time zone: UTC+5:30 (IST)
- Postal code: 533 446

Labbarthi is a village in Rajavommangi Mandal, Polavaram district in the state of Andhra Pradesh in India.

== Geography ==
Labbarthi is located at 17.5614609°N 82.1872140°E

== Demographics ==
As of 2011 India census, Labbarthi had a population of 1780, out of which 855 were male and 895 were female. The population of children below 6 years of age was 11%. The literacy rate of the village was 55%.
