= Kanatalabanda =

- village
- Interactive map of Kanatalabanda
- Location in Andhra Pradesh, India Kanatalabanda (India)
- Coordinates: 17.6145°N 81.9885°E
- Country: India
- State: Andhra Pradesh
- District: Polavaram

Area
  - Total: 0.42 km^{2} (0.16 sq mi)

Population (2011)
  - Total: 232
  - Density: 552/km^{2} (1,430/sq mi)

Languages
  - Official: Telugu
- Time zone: UTC+5:30 (IST)

Kanatalabanda is a village in Y. Ramavaram Mandal, Polavaram district in the state of Andhra Pradesh in India.

== Demographics ==
As of 2011 India census, This Village had a population of 232, out of which 121 were male and 111 were female. Population of children below 6 years of age were 12%. The literacy rate of the village is 47%.
