= Komaravaram, Y. Ramavaram Mandal =

Komaravaram
- village
- Interactive map of Komaravaram
- Location in Andhra Pradesh, India Komaravaram (India)
- Coordinates: 17.7245°N 81.6958°E
- Country: India
- State: Andhra Pradesh
- District: Polavaram

Area
  - Total: 0.25 km^{2} (0.097 sq mi)

Population (2011)
  - Total: 81
  - Density: 324/km^{2} (840/sq mi)

Languages
  - Official: Telugu
- Time zone: UTC+5:30 (IST)

Komaravaram is a village in Y. Ramavaram Mandal, Polavaram district in the state of Andhra Pradesh in India.

== Demographics ==
As of 2011 India census, This Village had a population of 81, out of which 36 were male and 45 were female. Population of children below 6 years of age were 10%. The literacy rate of the village is 53%.
