= Kota, Y. Ramavaram Mandal =

Kota
- village
- Interactive map of Kota
- Location in Andhra Pradesh, India Kota (India)
- Coordinates: 17.5561°N 81.9058°E
- Country: India
- State: Andhra Pradesh
- District: Polavaram

Area
  - Total: 0.3 km^{2} (0.12 sq mi)

Population (2011)
  - Total: 469
  - Density: 1,563/km^{2} (4,050/sq mi)

Languages
  - Official: Telugu
- Time zone: UTC+5:30 (IST)

Kota is a village in Y. Ramavaram Mandal, Polavaram district in the state of Andhra Pradesh in India.

== Demographics ==
As of 2011 India census, this Village had a population of 469, out of which 266 were male and 203 were female. Population of children below 6 years of age were 11%. The literacy rate of the village is 56%.
