= Chinavulempadu =

- village
- Interactive map of Chinavulempadu
- Location in Andhra Pradesh, India Chinavulempadu (India)
- Coordinates: 17.5353°N 81.9621°E
- Country: India
- State: Andhra Pradesh
- District: Polavaram

Area
  - Total: 0.43 km^{2} (0.17 sq mi)

Population (2011)
  - Total: 228
  - Density: 530/km^{2} (1,400/sq mi)

Languages
  - Official: Telugu
- Time zone: UTC+5:30 (IST)

Chinavulempadu is a village in Y. Ramavaram Mandal, Polavaram district in the state of Andhra Pradesh in India.

== Demographics ==
As of the 2011 census of India, the village had a population of 228, out of which 115 were male and 113 were female. Children below 6 years of age were 16% of the population. The literacy rate of the village was 34%.
