= Chamagedda =

- village
- Interactive map of Chamagedda
- Location in Andhra Pradesh, India Chamagedda (India)
- Coordinates: 17.6588°N 81.9815°E
- Country: India
- State: Andhra Pradesh
- District: Polavaram

Area
  - Total: 0.35 km^{2} (0.14 sq mi)

Population (2011)
  - Total: 52
  - Density: 149/km^{2} (390/sq mi)

Languages
  - Official: Telugu
- Time zone: UTC+5:30 (IST)

Chamagedda is a village in Y. Ramavaram Mandal, Polavaram district in the state of Andhra Pradesh in India.

== Demographics ==
As of 2011 India census, This Village had a population of 52, out of which 24 were male and 28 were female. Population of children below 6 years of age were 15%. The literacy rate of the village is 45%.
