= Chinthakarrapalem =

- village
- Interactive map of Chinthakarrapalem
- Location in Andhra Pradesh, India Chinthakarrapalem (India)
- Coordinates: 17.6364°N 81.9721°E
- Country: India
- State: Andhra Pradesh
- District: Polavaram

Area
  - Total: 1.89 km^{2} (0.73 sq mi)

Population (2011)
  - Total: 411
  - Density: 217/km^{2} (560/sq mi)

Languages
  - Official: Telugu
- Time zone: UTC+5:30 (IST)

Chinthakarrapalem is a village in Y. Ramavaram Mandal, Polavaram district in the state of Andhra Pradesh in India.

== Demographics ==
As of 2011 India census, This Village had a population of 411, out of which 199 were male and 212 were female. Population of children below 6 years of age were 14%. The literacy rate of the village is 41%.
