= Boddagunta =

- village
- Interactive map of Boddagunta
- Location in Andhra Pradesh, India Boddagunta (India)
- Coordinates: 17.6007°N 81.8268°E
- Country: India
- State: Andhra Pradesh
- District: Polavaram
- Mandal: Y. Ramavaram

Area
  - Total: 0.22 km^{2} (0.085 sq mi)

Population (2011)
  - Total: 97
  - Density: 441/km^{2} (1,140/sq mi)

Languages
  - Official: Telugu
- Time zone: UTC+5:30 (IST)

Boddagunta is a village in Y. Ramavaram Mandal, Polavaram district in the state of Andhra Pradesh in India.

== Demographics ==
As of 2011 India census, This Village had a population of 97, out of which 45 were male and 52 were female. Population of children below 6 years of age were 16%. The literacy rate of the village is 17%.
