= Nellikota =

- village
- Interactive map of Nellikota
- Location in Andhra Pradesh, India Nellikota (India)
- Coordinates: 17.6758°N 82.0174°E
- Country: India
- State: Andhra Pradesh
- District: Polavaram

Area
  - Total: 0.17 km^{2} (0.066 sq mi)

Population (2011)
  - Total: 35
  - Density: 206/km^{2} (530/sq mi)

Languages
  - Official: Telugu
- Time zone: UTC+5:30 (IST)

Nellikota is a village in Y. Ramavaram Mandal, Polavaram district in the state of Andhra Pradesh in India.

== Demographics ==
As of 2011 India census, This Village had a population of 35, out of which 18 were male and 17 were female. Population of children below 6 years of age were 9%. The literacy rate of the village is 34%.
