= Chervukommupalem =

Village in Andhra Pradesh, India

- village
- Interactive map of Chervukommupalem
- Location in Andhra Pradesh, India Chervukommupalem (India)
- Coordinates: 17.4408°N 82.1541°E
- Country: India
- State: Andhra Pradesh
- District: Polavaram

Area
  - Total: 0.32 km^{2} (0.12 sq mi)

Population (2011)
  - Total: 580
  - Density: 1,813/km^{2} (4,700/sq mi)

Languages
  - Official: Telugu
- Time zone: UTC+5:30 (IST)
- Postal code: 533 446

Chervukommupalem is a village in Rajavommangi Mandal, Polavaram district in the state of Andhra Pradesh in India.

== Geography ==
Chervukommupalem is located at 17.4408°N 82.1541°E.

== Demographics ==
As of 2011 India census, Chervukommupalem had a population of 580, out of which 282 were male and 298 were female. The population of children below 6 years of age was 11%. The literacy rate of the village was 65%.
