= Dusaripamu =

- Village
- Interactive map of Dusaripamu
- Location in Andhra Pradesh, India Dusaripamu (India)
- Coordinates: 17.54082°N 82.22296°E
- Country: India
- State: Andhra Pradesh
- District: Polavaram

Area
  - Total: 3 km^{2} (1.2 sq mi)

Population (2011)
  - Total: 1,694
  - Density: 507/km^{2} (1,310/sq mi)

Languages
  - Official: Telugu
- Time zone: UTC+5:30 (IST)
- Postal code: 533 446

Dusaripamu is a village in Rajavommangi Mandal, Polavaram district in the state of Andhra Pradesh in India.

== Geography ==
Dusaripamu is located at 17.5047°N 82.2182°E.

== Demographics ==
As of 2011 India census, Dusaripamu had a population of 1694, out of which 870 were male and 824 were female. The population of children below 6 years of age was 10%. The literacy rate of the village was 58%.
