= Kondapalle, Rajavommangi Mandal =

Village in Andhra Pradesh, India

Kondapalle
- village
- Interactive map of Kondapalle
- Location in Andhra Pradesh, India Kondapalle (India)
- Coordinates: 17.6032°N 82.2477°E
- Country: India
- State: Andhra Pradesh
- District: Polavaram

Area
  - Total: 4 km^{2} (1.5 sq mi)

Population (2011)
  - Total: 513
  - Density: 125/km^{2} (320/sq mi)

Languages
  - Official: Telugu
- Time zone: UTC+5:30 (IST)
- Postal code: 533 446

Kondapalle is a village in Rajavommangi Mandal, Alluri Sitharama Raju district in the state of Andhra Pradesh in India.

== Geography ==
Kondapalle is located at 17.6032°N 82.2477°E.

== Demographics ==
As of 2011 India census, Kondapalle had a population of 513, out of which 262 were male and 251 were female. The population of children below 6 years of age was 11%. The literacy rate of the village was 65%.
