= Gandempalle =

- Village
- Interactive map of Gandempalle
- Location in Andhra Pradesh, India Gandempalle (India)
- Coordinates: 17.5122°N 81.9449°E
- Country: India
- State: Andhra Pradesh
- District: Polavaram

Area
  - Total: 0.18 km^{2} (0.069 sq mi)

Population (2011)
  - Total: 46
  - Density: 256/km^{2} (660/sq mi)

Languages
  - Official: Telugu
- Time zone: UTC+5:30 (IST)

Gandempalle is a village in Y. Ramavaram Mandal, Polavaram district in the state of Andhra Pradesh in India.

== Demographics ==
At the 2011 India census, Gandempalle had a population of 46 (23 male and 23 female). 11% of the population were children below 6 years of age. The literacy rate was 17%.
