= Nellimetla =

Village in Andhra Pradesh, India

- village
- Interactive map of Nellimetla
- Location in Andhra Pradesh, India Nellimetla (India)
- Coordinates: 17.5092°N 82.1954°E
- Country: India
- State: Andhra Pradesh
- District: Polavaram

Area
  - Total: 4 km^{2} (1.5 sq mi)

Population (2011)
  - Total: 485
  - Density: 120/km^{2} (310/sq mi)

Languages
  - Official: Telugu
- Time zone: UTC+5:30 (IST)
- Postal code: 533 446

Nellimetla is a village in Rajavommangi Mandal, Polavaram district in the state of Andhra Pradesh in India.

== Geography ==
Nellimetla is located at 17.5092°N 82.1954°E.

== Demographics ==
As of 2011 India census, Nellimetla had a population of 485, out of which 243 were male and 242 were female. The population of children below 6 years of age was 14%. The literacy rate of the village was 53%.
