= Jaddangi =

- village
- Interactive map of Jaddangi
- Location in Andhra Pradesh, India Jaddangi (India)
- Coordinates: 17°28′52″N 82°09′19″E
- Country: India
- State: Andhra Pradesh
- District: Polavaram

Area
  - Total: 17.61 km^{2} (6.80 sq mi)

Population (2011)
  - Total: 3,573
  - Density: 203/km^{2} (530/sq mi)

Languages
  - Official: Telugu
- Time zone: UTC+5:30 (IST)
- Postal code: 533 446

Jaddangi is a village in Rajavommangi Mandal, Polavaram district in the state of Andhra Pradesh in India.

== Geography ==
Jaddangi is located at 17.4810°N 82.1476°E.

== Demographics ==
As of 2011 India census, Jaddangi had a population of 3,573, out of which 1,794 were male and 1,779 were female. The population of children below 6 years of age was 8%. The literacy rate of the village was 61%.
