= Paidiputta =

- village
- Interactive map of Paidiputta
- Location in Andhra Pradesh, India Paidiputta (India)
- Coordinates: 17.6272°N 81.9392°E
- Country: India
- State: Andhra Pradesh
- District: Polavaram

Area
  - Total: 0.33 km^{2} (0.13 sq mi)

Population (2011)
  - Total: 101
  - Density: 306/km^{2} (790/sq mi)

Languages
  - Official: Telugu
- Time zone: UTC+5:30 (IST)

Paidiputta is a village in Y. Ramavaram Mandal, Polavaram district in the state of Andhra Pradesh in India.

== Demographics ==
As of 2011 India census, This Village had a population of 101, out of which 39 were male and 62 were female. Population of children below 6 years of age were 13%. The literacy rate of the village is 45%.
