= Mulasalapalem =

- village
- Interactive map of Mulasalapalem
- Location in Andhra Pradesh, India Mulasalapalem (India)
- Coordinates: 17.4998°N 81.9048°E
- Country: India
- State: Andhra Pradesh
- District: Polavaram

Area
  - Total: 0.59 km^{2} (0.23 sq mi)

Population (2011)
  - Total: 208
  - Density: 353/km^{2} (910/sq mi)

Languages
  - Official: Telugu
- Time zone: UTC+5:30 (IST)

Mulasalapalem is a village in Y. Ramavaram Mandal, Polavaram district in the state of Andhra Pradesh in India.

== Demographics ==
As of 2011 India census, This Village had a population of 208, out of which 105 were male and 103 were female. Population of children below 6 years of age were 11%. The literacy rate of the village is 46%.
