= Gaduvakurthi =

Village in Andhra Pradesh, India

- village
- Interactive map of Gaduvakurthi
- Location in Andhra Pradesh, India Gaduvakurthi (India)
- Coordinates: 17.5297°N 82.1303°E
- Country: India
- State: Andhra Pradesh
- District: Polavaram

Area
  - Total: 3 km^{2} (1.2 sq mi)

Population (2011)
  - Total: 451
  - Density: 143/km^{2} (370/sq mi)

Languages
  - Official: Telugu
- Time zone: UTC+5:30 (IST)
- Postal code: 533 446

Gaduvakurthi is a village in Rajavommangi Mandal, Polavaram district in the state of Andhra Pradesh in India.

== Geography ==
Gaduvakurthi is located at 17.5297°N 82.1303°E.

== Demographics ==
As of 2011 India census, Gaduvakurthi had a population of 451, out of which 218 were male and 233 were female. The population of children below 6 years of age was 12%. The literacy rate of the village was 48%.
