= Daralova =

- village
- Interactive map of Daralova
- Location in Andhra Pradesh, India Daralova (India)
- Coordinates: 17.6964°N 81.8961°E
- Country: India
- State: Andhra Pradesh
- District: Polavaram

Area
  - Total: 0.15 km^{2} (0.058 sq mi)

Population (2011)
  - Total: 36
  - Density: 240/km^{2} (620/sq mi)

Languages
  - Official: Telugu
- Time zone: UTC+5:30 (IST)

Daralova is a village in Y. Ramavaram Mandal, Polavaram district in the state of Andhra Pradesh in India.

== Demographics ==
As of 2011 India census, This Village had a population of 36, out of which 19 were male and 17 were female. Population of children below 6 years of age were 11%. The literacy rate of the village is 4%.
