= Dabbamamidi =

- village
- Interactive map of Dabbamamidi
- Location in Andhra Pradesh, India Dabbamamidi (India)
- Coordinates: 17.6232°N 81.9961°E
- Country: India
- State: Andhra Pradesh
- District: Polavaram

Area
  - Total: 0.33 km^{2} (0.13 sq mi)

Population (2011)
  - Total: 169
  - Density: 512/km^{2} (1,330/sq mi)

Languages
  - Official: Telugu
- Time zone: UTC+5:30 (IST)

Dabbamamidi is a village in Y. Ramavaram Mandal, Polavaram district in the state of Andhra Pradesh in India.

== Demographics ==
As of 2011 India census, This Village had a population of 169, out of which 80 were male and 89 were female. Population of children below 6 years of age were 12%. The literacy rate of the village is 55%.
