= Gummarapalem =

- village
- Interactive map of Gummarapalem
- Location in Andhra Pradesh, India Gummarapalem (India)
- Coordinates: 17.5581°N 81.9744°E
- Country: India
- State: Andhra Pradesh
- District: Polavaram

Area
  - Total: 3.17 km^{2} (1.22 sq mi)

Population (2011)
  - Total: 251
  - Density: 79/km^{2} (200/sq mi)

Languages
  - Official: Telugu
- Time zone: UTC+5:30 (IST)

Gummarapalem is a village in Y. Ramavaram Mandal, Polavaram district in the state of Andhra Pradesh in India.

== Demographics ==
As of 2011 India census, This Village had a population of 251, out of which 124 were male and 127 were female. Population of children below 6 years of age were 16%. The literacy rate of the village is 41%.
