= P. Yerragonda =

- village
- Interactive map of P. Yerragonda
- Location in Andhra Pradesh, India P. Yerragonda (India)
- Coordinates: 17.5957°N 81.9596°E
- Country: India
- State: Andhra Pradesh
- District: Polavaram

Area
  - Total: 3.85 km^{2} (1.49 sq mi)

Population (2011)
  - Total: 1,244
  - Density: 323/km^{2} (840/sq mi)

Languages
  - Official: Telugu
- Time zone: UTC+5:30 (IST)

P. Yerragonda is a village in Y. Ramavaram Mandal, Polavaram district in the state of Andhra Pradesh in India.

== Demographics ==
As of 2011 India census, This Village had a population of 1244, out of which 245 were male and 999 were female. Population of children below 6 years of age were 4%. The literacy rate of the village is 85%.
