= Panasalapalem =

- village
- Interactive map of Panasalapalem
- Location in Andhra Pradesh, India Panasalapalem (India)
- Coordinates: 17.6081°N 81.9771°E
- Country: India
- State: Andhra Pradesh
- District: Polavaram

Area
  - Total: 1.33 km^{2} (0.51 sq mi)

Population (2011)
  - Total: 902
  - Density: 678/km^{2} (1,760/sq mi)

Languages
  - Official: Telugu
- Time zone: UTC+5:30 (IST)

Panasalapalem is a village in Y. Ramavaram Mandal, Polavaram district in the state of Andhra Pradesh in India.

== Demographics ==
As of 2011 India census, This Village had a population of 902, out of which 581 were male and 321 were female. Population of children below 6 years of age were 5%. The literacy rate of the village is 67%.
