= Etapaka revenue division =

Coordinates: 15°54′N 80°40′E

Etapaka revenue division (or Yetapaka division) was an administrative division in the then bigger East Godavari district of the Indian state of Andhra Pradesh. It was one of the 7 revenue divisions in the erstwhile district which consists of 4 mandals under its administration. Etapaka is the divisional headquarters.

== History ==
It was dissolved as part of creation of Polavaram district on 31 Dec 2025. Its constituents were moved to newly formed Chinturu revenue division

== Administration ==
There were 4 mandals in Etapaka revenue division, which were merged from erstwhile Khammam district of Telangana into erstwhile East Godavari district of Andhra Pradesh.
