= Kindra, Rajavommangi Mandal =

Kindra
- village
- Interactive map of Kindra
- Location in Andhra Pradesh, India Kindra (India)
- Coordinates: 17°35′18″N 82°10′47″E
- Country: India
- State: Andhra Pradesh
- District: Polavaram

Area
  - Total: 9 km^{2} (3.5 sq mi)

Population (2011)
  - Total: 1,446
  - Density: 165/km^{2} (430/sq mi)

Languages
  - Official: Telugu
- Time zone: UTC+5:30 (IST)
- Postal code: 533 446

Kindra is a village in Rajavommangi Mandal, Polavaram district in the state of Andhra Pradesh in India.

== Geography ==
Kindra is located at 17.5777°N 82.1803°E.

== Demographics ==
As of 2011 India census, Kindra had a population of 1446, out of which 734 were male and 712 were female. The population of children below 6 years of age was 9%. The literacy rate of the village was 60%.
