= Dorawada =

- village
- Interactive map of Dorawada
- Location in Andhra Pradesh, India Dorawada (India)
- Coordinates: 17.6740°N 81.8758°E
- Country: India
- State: Andhra Pradesh
- District: Polavaram

Area
  - Total: 0.57 km^{2} (0.22 sq mi)

Population (2011)
  - Total: 21
  - Density: 37/km^{2} (96/sq mi)

Languages
  - Official: Telugu
- Time zone: UTC+5:30 (IST)

Dorawada is a village in Y. Ramavaram Mandal, Polavaram district in the state of Andhra Pradesh in India.

== Demographics ==
As of 2011 India census, This Village had a population of 21, out of which 9 were male and 12 were female. Population of children below 6 years of age were 19%. The literacy rate of the village is 2%.
