= Velagalapalem =

Village in Andhra Pradesh, India

- village
- Interactive map of Velagalapalem
- Location in Andhra Pradesh, India Velagalapalem (India)
- Coordinates: 17.4368°N 82.1172°E
- Country: India
- State: Andhra Pradesh
- District: Polavaram

Area
  - Total: 2 km^{2} (0.77 sq mi)

Population (2011)
  - Total: 594
  - Density: 335/km^{2} (870/sq mi)

Languages
  - Official: Telugu
- Time zone: UTC+5:30 (IST)
- Postal code: 533 446

Velagalapalem is a village in Rajavommangi Mandal, Polavaram district in the state of Andhra Pradesh in India.

== Geography ==
Velagalapalem is located at 17.4368°N 82.1172°E.

== Demographics ==
As of 2011 India census, Velagalapalem had a population of 594, out of which 294 were male and 300 were female. The population of children below 6 years of age was 9%. The literacy rate of the village was 52%.
