= Nulakamamidi =

- village
- Interactive map of Nulakamamidi
- Location in Andhra Pradesh, India Nulakamamidi (India)
- Coordinates: 17.6602°N 81.9188°E
- Country: India
- State: Andhra Pradesh
- District: Polavaram

Area
  - Total: 0.11 km^{2} (0.042 sq mi)

Population (2011)
  - Total: 98
  - Density: 891/km^{2} (2,310/sq mi)

Languages
  - Official: Telugu
- Time zone: UTC+5:30 (IST)

Nulakamamidi is a village in Y. Ramavaram Mandal, Polavaram district in the state of Andhra Pradesh in India.

== Demographics ==
As of 2011 India census, This Village had a population of 98, out of which 43 were male and 55 were female. Population of children below 6 years of age were 14%. The literacy rate of the village is 18%.
