= Perikivalasa =

- village
- Interactive map of Perikivalasa
- Location in Andhra Pradesh, India Perikivalasa (India)
- Coordinates: 17.7214°N 81.8754°E
- Country: India
- State: Andhra Pradesh
- District: Polavaram

Population (2011)
  - Total: 268

Languages
  - Official: Telugu
- Time zone: UTC+5:30 (IST)

Perikivalasa is a village in Y. Ramavaram Mandal, Polavaram district in the state of Andhra Pradesh in India.

== Demographics ==
As of 2011 India census, This Village had a population of 268, out of which 122 were male and 30 were female. Population of children below 6 years of age were 13.06%. The literacy rate of the village is 47.64%.
