= Buruguwada =

- village
- Interactive map of Buruguwada
- Location in Andhra Pradesh, India Buruguwada (India)
- Coordinates: 17.5656°N 81.3660°E
- Country: India
- State: Andhra Pradesh
- District: Polavaram
- Mandal: Y. Ramavaram

Area
  - Total: 1.09 km^{2} (0.42 sq mi)

Population (2011)
  - Total: 173
  - Density: 159/km^{2} (410/sq mi)

Languages
  - Official: Telugu
- Time zone: UTC+5:30 (IST)

Buruguwada is a village in Y. Ramavaram Mandal, Polavaram district in the state of Andhra Pradesh in India.

== Demographics ==
As of 2011 India census, This Village had a population of 173, out of which 92 were male and 81 were female. Population of children below 6 years of age were 12%. The literacy rate of the village is 47%.
