= Ammirekala =

Village in Andhra Pradesh, India

- village
- Interactive map of Ammirekala
- Location in Andhra Pradesh, India Ammirekala (India)
- Coordinates: 17.5447°N 82.3031°E
- Country: India
- State: Andhra Pradesh
- District: Polavaram
- Mandal: Rajavommangi

Area
  - Total: 2 km^{2} (0.77 sq mi)

Population (2011)
  - Total: 467
  - Density: 243/km^{2} (630/sq mi)

Languages
  - Official: Telugu
- Time zone: UTC+5:30 (IST)
- Postal code: 533 446

Ammirekala is a village in Rajavommangi Mandal, Polavaram district in the state of Andhra Pradesh in India.

== Geography ==
Ammirekala is located at 17.5447°N 82.3031°E.

== Demographics ==
As of 2011 India census, Ammirekala had a population of 467, out of which 227 were male and 240 were female. The population of children below 6 years of age was 11%. The literacy rate of the village was 47%.
