= Bullojupalem =

- village
- Interactive map of Bullojupalem
- Location in Andhra Pradesh, India Bullojupalem (India)
- Coordinates: 17.5412°N 81.9092°E
- Country: India
- State: Andhra Pradesh
- District: Polavaram
- Mandal: Y. Ramavaram

Area
  - Total: 0.38 km^{2} (0.15 sq mi)

Population (2011)
  - Total: 230
  - Density: 605/km^{2} (1,570/sq mi)

Languages
  - Official: Telugu
- Time zone: UTC+5:30 (IST)

Bullojupalem is a village in Y. Ramavaram Mandal, Polavaram district in the state of Andhra Pradesh in India.

== Demographics ==
As of 2011 India census, This Village had a population of 230, out of which 115 were male and 115 were female. Population of children below 6 years of age were 22%. The literacy rate of the village is 32%.
