= Jajigedda =

- village
- Interactive map of Jajigedda
- Location in Andhra Pradesh, India Jajigedda (India)
- Coordinates: 17°41′47″N 81°58′56″E
- Country: India
- State: Andhra Pradesh
- District: Polavaram

Area
  - Total: 1.04 km^{2} (0.40 sq mi)

Population (2011)
  - Total: 34
  - Density: 33/km^{2} (85/sq mi)

Languages
  - Official: Telugu
- Time zone: UTC+5:30 (IST)

Jajigedda is a village in Y. Ramavaram Mandal, Polavaram district in the state of Andhra Pradesh in India.

== Demographics ==
As of 2011 India census, This Village had a population of 34, out of which 17 were male and 17 were female. Population of children below 6 years of age were 18%. The literacy rate of the village is 29%.
