= Bheemudugadda =

- village
- Interactive map of Bheemudugadda
- Location in Andhra Pradesh, India Bheemudugadda (India)
- Coordinates: 17.6290°N 81.8566°E
- Country: India
- State: Andhra Pradesh
- District: Polavaram
- Mandal: Y. Ramavaram

Area
  - Total: 1.19 km^{2} (0.46 sq mi)

Population (2011)
  - Total: 178
  - Density: 150/km^{2} (390/sq mi)

Languages
  - Official: Telugu
- Time zone: UTC+5:30 (IST)

Bheemudugadda is a village in Y. Ramavaram Mandal, Polavaram district in the state of Andhra Pradesh in India.

== Demographics ==
As of 2011 India census, this village had a population of 178, out of which 94 were male and 84 were female. Population of children below 6 years of age were 17%. The literacy rate of the village is 25%.
