= Naluguroadlu =

Naluguroadlu MadiCross
- Village
- Nickname: FourRoads
- Country: India
- State: Andhra Pradesh
- District: Chittoor

Languages
  - Official: Telugu
- Time zone: UTC+5:30 (IST)
- PIN: 517432
- Vehicle registration: AP 03

Naluguroadlu is a village in Gangavaram mandal, located in Chittoor district of Andhra Pradesh, India. It comes under Gandrajupalle Panchayath and forms a part of the Rayalaseema region.

It is located 64 kilometres (40 mi) west of the district headquarters at Chittoor, 20 kilometres (12 mi) from Gangavaram and 544 kilometres (338 mi) from the state capital at Hyderabad.
