= Pathikonda =

- village
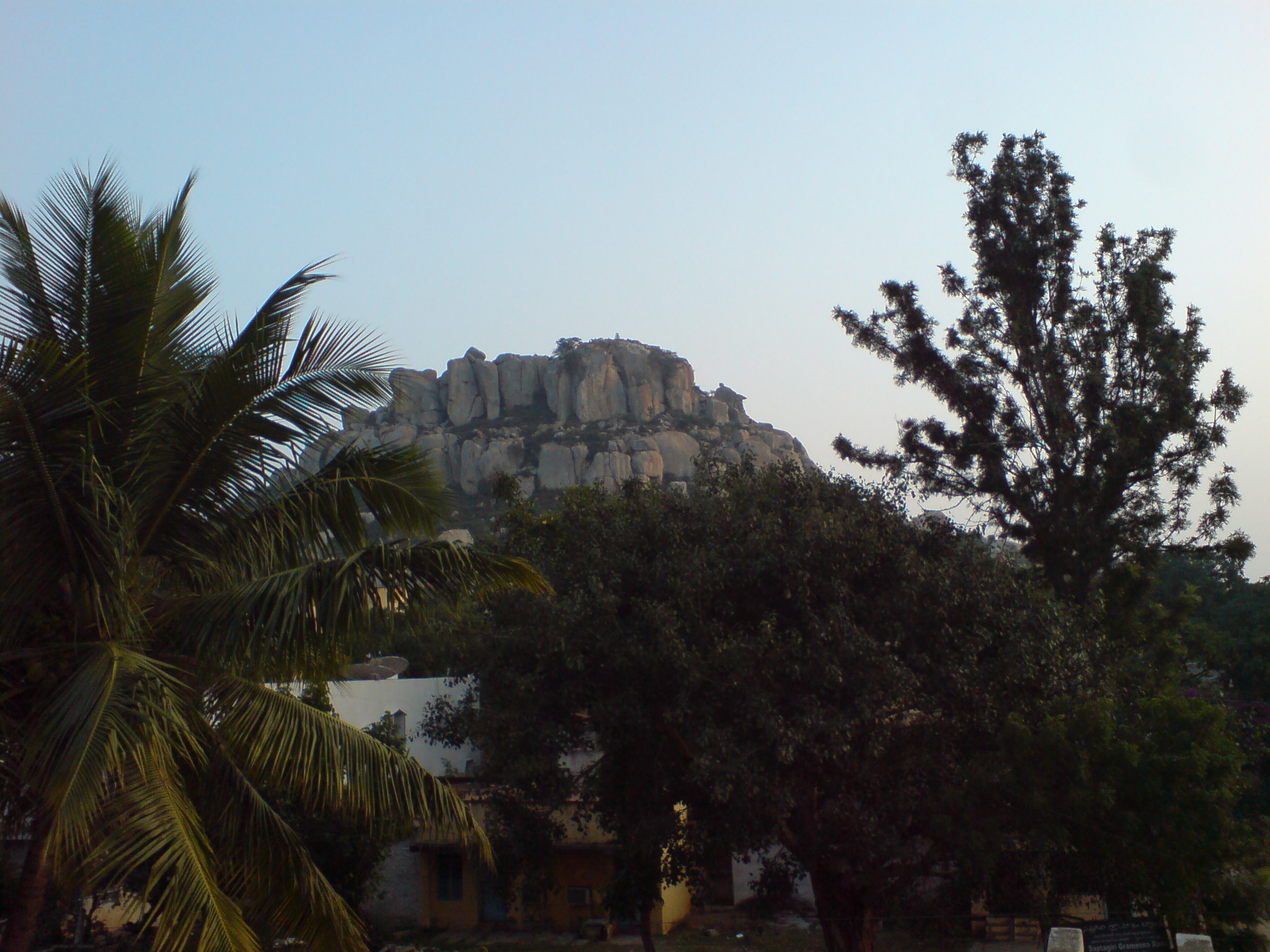
- Interactive map of Pathikonda
- Location in Andhra Pradesh, India Pathikonda (India)
- Coordinates: 13°11′N 78°39′E
- Country: India
- State: Andhra Pradesh
- District: Chittoor
- Talukas: Palamaner

Languages
  - Official: Telugu
- Time zone: UTC+5:30 (IST)
- PIN: 517432
- Vehicle registration: AP

Pathikonda is a village in Gangavaram mandal in Chittoor district in the state of Andhra Pradesh in India.

== Forests ==
Pathikonda is surrounded by valleys, hills, rocky land, and forests.

The forest around the town is the only place in Andhra Pradesh with wild elephants. The forest of Pathikonda has been declared as a part of Palamaner's elephant sanctuary.

== Education ==
Primary and secondary school education is imparted by government, aided and private schools, under the School Education Department of the state. The medium of instruction followed by different schools are English and Telugu.

== Local Festival ==
Gangajathara is very famous Irrespective of caste, color, creed everyone in the village celebrate this festival in the summer 18 days after Sri Ramanavami. The goddess is called as Pedhapuli Gangamma.
