= Nakkalapadu =

- village
- Interactive map of Nakkalapadu
- Location in Andhra Pradesh, India Nakkalapadu (India)
- Coordinates: 17.5095°N 81.9625°E
- Country: India
- State: Andhra Pradesh
- District: Polavaram

Area
  - Total: 0.07 km^{2} (0.027 sq mi)

Population (2011)
  - Total: 34
  - Density: 486/km^{2} (1,260/sq mi)

Languages
  - Official: Telugu
- Time zone: UTC+5:30 (IST)

Nakkalapadu is a village in Y. Ramavaram Mandal, Polavaram district in the state of Andhra Pradesh in India.

== Demographics ==
As of 2011 India census, This Village had a population of 34, out of which 19 were male and 15 were female. Population of children below 6 years of age were91%. The literacy rate of the village is 29%.
