= Nakkarathipalem =

- village
- Interactive map of Nakkarathipalem
- Location in Andhra Pradesh, India Nakkarathipalem (India)
- Coordinates: 17.6373°N 81.9899°E
- Country: India
- State: Andhra Pradesh
- District: Polavaram

Area
  - Total: 0.31 km^{2} (0.12 sq mi)

Population (2011)
  - Total: 54
  - Density: 174/km^{2} (450/sq mi)

Languages
  - Official: Telugu
- Time zone: UTC+5:30 (IST)

Nakkarathipalem is a village in Y. Ramavaram Mandal, Polavaram district in the state of Andhra Pradesh in India.

== Demographics ==
As of 2011 India census, This Village had a population of 54, out of which 27 were male and 27 were female. Population of children below 6 years of age were 15%. The literacy rate of the village is 39%.
