= Nuvvugantipalem =

- village
- Interactive map of Nuvvugantipalem
- Location in Andhra Pradesh, India Nuvvugantipalem (India)
- Coordinates: 17.5261°N 81.8762°E
- Country: India
- State: Andhra Pradesh
- District: Polavaram

Area
  - Total: 0.29 km^{2} (0.11 sq mi)

Population (2011)
  - Total: 143
  - Density: 493/km^{2} (1,280/sq mi)

Languages
  - Official: Telugu
- Time zone: UTC+5:30 (IST)

Nuvvugantipalem is a village in Y. Ramavaram Mandal, Polavaram district in the state of Andhra Pradesh in India.

== Demographics ==
As of 2011 India census, This Village had a population of 143, out of which 69 were male and 74 were female. Population of children below 6 years of age were 20%. The literacy rate of the village is 42%.
