= Ananthagiri, Rajavommangi Mandal =

Ananthagiri
- village
- Interactive map of Ananthagiri
- Location in Andhra Pradesh, India Ananthagiri (India)
- Coordinates: 17.5497°N 82.1518°E
- Country: India
- State: Andhra Pradesh
- District: Polavaram
- Mandal: Rajavommangi

Area
  - Total: 4 km^{2} (1.5 sq mi)

Population (2011)
  - Total: 431
  - Density: 96/km^{2} (250/sq mi)

Languages
  - Official: Telugu
- Time zone: UTC+5:30 (IST)
- Postal code: 533 446

Ananthagiri is a village in Rajavommangi Mandal, Polavaram district in the state of Andhra Pradesh in India.

== Geography ==
Ananthagiri is located at 17.5497°N 82.1518°E.

== Demographics ==
As of 2011 India census, Ananthagiri had a population of 431, out of which 216 were male and 215 were female. The population of children below 6 years of age was 11%. The literacy rate of the village was 58%.
