= Maredubaka, Rajavommangi Mandal =

Maredubaka
- village
- Interactive map of Maredubaka
- Location in Andhra Pradesh, India Maredubaka (India)
- Coordinates: 17.3672°N 82.1632°E
- Country: India
- State: Andhra Pradesh
- District: Polavaram

Area
  - Total: 5 km^{2} (1.9 sq mi)

Population (2011)
  - Total: 442
  - Density: 93/km^{2} (240/sq mi)

Languages
  - Official: Telugu
- Time zone: UTC+5:30 (IST)
- Postal code: 533 446

Maredubaka is a village in Rajavommangi Mandal, Polavaram district in the state of Andhra Pradesh in India.

== Geography ==
Maredubaka is located at 17.3672°N 82.1632°E.

== Demographics ==
As of 2011 India census, Maredubaka had a population of 442, out of which 213 were male and 229 were female. The population of children below 6 years of age was 9%. The literacy rate of the village was 48%.
