= Singampalle, Rajavommangi Mandal =

Singampalle
- village
- Interactive map of Singampalle
- Location in Andhra Pradesh, India Singampalle (India)
- Coordinates: 17°30′45″N 82°10′54″E
- Country: India
- State: Andhra Pradesh
- District: Polavaram

Area
  - Total: 3 km^{2} (1.2 sq mi)

Population (2011)
  - Total: 747
  - Density: 216/km^{2} (560/sq mi)

Languages
  - Official: Telugu
- Time zone: UTC+5:30 (IST)
- Postal code: 533 446

Singampalle is a village in Rajavommangi Mandal, Polavaram district in the state of Andhra Pradesh in India.

== Geography ==
Singampalle is located at 17.4805°N 82.1829°E.

== Demographics ==
As of 2011 India census, Singampalle had a population of 747, out of which 239 were male and 508 female. The population of children below 6 years of age was 6%. The literacy rate of the village was 59%.
