= Jangalathota =

- village
- Interactive map of Jangalathota
- Location in Andhra Pradesh, India Jangalathota (India)
- Coordinates: 17°42′58″N 82°01′30″E
- Country: India
- State: Andhra Pradesh
- District: Polavaram

Area
  - Total: 2.66 km^{2} (1.03 sq mi)

Population (2011)
  - Total: 218
  - Density: 82/km^{2} (210/sq mi)

Languages
  - Official: Telugu
- Time zone: UTC+5:30 (IST)

Jangalathota is a village in Y. Ramavaram Mandal, Polavaram district in the state of Andhra Pradesh in India.

== Demographics ==
As of 2011 India census, This Village had a population of 218, out of which 110 were male and 108 were female. Population of children below 6 years of age were 16%. The literacy rate of the village is 37%.
