= Lododdi =

Village in Andhra Pradesh, India

- village
- Interactive map of Lododdi
- Location in Andhra Pradesh, India Lododdi (India)
- Coordinates: 17°30′37″N 82°18′46″E
- Country: India
- State: Andhra Pradesh
- District: Polavaram

Area
  - Total: 2 km^{2} (0.77 sq mi)

Population (2011)
  - Total: 475
  - Density: 267/km^{2} (690/sq mi)

Languages
  - Official: Telugu
- Time zone: UTC+5:30 (IST)
- Postal code: 533 446

Lododdi is a village in Rajavommangi Mandal, Polavaram district in the state of Andhra Pradesh in India.

== Geography ==
Lododdi is located at 17.4846°N 82.2961°E.

== Demographics ==
As of 2011 India census, Lododdi had a population of 475, out of which 269 were male and 206 were female. The population of children below 6 years of age was 10%. The literacy rate of the village was 52%.
