= Urlakulapadu =

- village
- Interactive map of Urlakulapadu
- Location in Andhra Pradesh, India Urlakulapadu (India)
- Coordinates: 17°26′30″N 82°08′31″E
- Country: India
- State: Andhra Pradesh
- District: Polavaram

Area
  - Total: 4 km^{2} (1.5 sq mi)

Population (2011)
  - Total: 794
  - Density: 178/km^{2} (460/sq mi)

Languages
  - Official: Telugu
- Time zone: UTC+5:30 (IST)
- Postal code: 533 446

Urlakulapadu is a village in Rajavommangi Mandal, Polavaram district in the state of Andhra Pradesh in India.

== Geography ==
Urlakulapadu is located at 17.4084°N 82.1602°E.

== Demographics ==
As of 2011 India census, Urlakulapadu had a population of 794, out of which 403 were male and 391 were female. The population of children below 6 years of age was 12%. The literacy rate of the village was 46%.
