= Aminabada, Rajavommangi Mandal =

Aminabada
- village
- Interactive map of Aminabada
- Location in Andhra Pradesh, India Aminabada (India)
- Coordinates: 17.4356°N 82.1775°E
- Country: India
- State: Andhra Pradesh
- District: Polavaram
- Mandal: Rajavommangi

Area
  - Total: 14 km^{2} (5.4 sq mi)

Population (2011)
  - Total: 1,987
  - Density: 146/km^{2} (380/sq mi)

Languages
  - Official: Telugu
- Time zone: UTC+5:30 (IST)
- Postal code: 533 446

Aminabada is a village in Rajavommangi Mandal, Polavaram district in the state of Andhra Pradesh in India.

== Geography ==
Aminabada is located at 17.4356°N 82.1775°E.

== Demographics ==
As of 2011 India census, Aminabada had a population of 1987, out of which 781 were male and 1206 were female. The population of children below 6 years of age was 9%. The literacy of the village was 62%.
