= Vogipalem =

Village in Andhra Pradesh, India

- village
- Interactive map of Vogipalem
- Location in Andhra Pradesh, India Vogipalem (India)
- Coordinates: 17.4480°N 82.2592°E
- Country: India
- State: Andhra Pradesh
- District: Polavaram

Area
  - Total: 2 km^{2} (0.77 sq mi)

Population (2011)
  - Total: 380
  - Density: 216/km^{2} (560/sq mi)

Languages
  - Official: Telugu
- Time zone: UTC+5:30 (IST)
- Postal code: 533 446

Vogipalem is a village in Rajavommangi Mandal, Polavaram district in the state of Andhra Pradesh in India.

== Geography ==
Vogipalem is located at 17.4480°N 82.2592°E.

== Demographics ==
As of 2011 India census, Vogipalem had a population of 380, out of which 190 were male and 190 were female. The population of children below 6 years of age was 13%. The literacy rate of the village was 26%.
