= Chinta Koyya =

- village
- Interactive map of Chinta Koyya
- Location in Andhra Pradesh, India Chinta Koyya (India)
- Coordinates: 17.5708°N 81.8146°E
- Country: India
- State: Andhra Pradesh
- District: Polavaram

Area
  - Total: 0.2 km^{2} (0.077 sq mi)

Population (2011)
  - Total: 196
  - Density: 980/km^{2} (2,500/sq mi)

Languages
  - Official: Telugu
- Time zone: UTC+5:30 (IST)

Chinta Koyya is a village in Y. Ramavaram Mandal, Polavaram district in the state of Andhra Pradesh in India.

== Demographics ==
As of 2011 India census, this Village had a population of 196: 101 male and 95 female. Population of children below 6 years of age was 18%. The literacy rate of the village is 33%.
