= Allurigedda =

- village
- Interactive map of Allurigedda
- Location in Andhra Pradesh, India Allurigedda (India)
- Coordinates: 17.8591°N 81.9274°E
- Country: India
- State: Andhra Pradesh
- District: Polavaram
- Mandal: Gurtedu

Area
  - Total: 0.33 km^{2} (0.13 sq mi)

Population (2011)
  - Total: 96
  - Density: 291/km^{2} (750/sq mi)

Languages
  - Official: Telugu
- Time zone: UTC+5:30 (IST)

Allurigedda is a village in Gurtedu mandal, Polavaram district in the state of Andhra Pradesh in India.

== Demographics ==
As of 2011 India census, This village had a population of 96, out of which 40 were male and 56 were female. Population of children below 6 years of age was 14%. The literacy rate of the village was 43%.
