= Antilova =

- village
- Interactive map of Antilova
- Location in Andhra Pradesh, India Antilova (India)
- Coordinates: 17.9230°N 81.9029°E
- Country: India
- State: Andhra Pradesh
- District: Polavaram
- Mandal: Gurtedu

Area
  - Total: 0.16 km^{2} (0.062 sq mi)

Population (2011)
  - Total: 188
  - Density: 1,175/km^{2} (3,040/sq mi)

Languages
  - Official: Telugu
- Time zone: UTC+5:30 (IST)

Antilova is a village in Gurtedu mandal, Polavaram district in the state of Andhra Pradesh in India.

== Demographics ==
As of 2011 India census, This Village had a population of 188, out of which 89 were male and 99 were female. Population of children below 6 years of age were 26%. The literacy rate of the village is 13%.
