= D. Mamidivada =

- village
- Interactive map of D. Mamidivada
- Location in Andhra Pradesh, India D. Mamidivada (India)
- Coordinates: 17.8655°N 81.8407°E
- Country: India
- State: Andhra Pradesh
- District: Polavaram
- Mandal: Gurtedu

Area
  - Total: 0.2 km^{2} (0.077 sq mi)

Population (2011)
  - Total: 247
  - Density: 1,235/km^{2} (3,200/sq mi)

Languages
  - Official: Telugu
- Time zone: UTC+5:30 (IST)

D. Mamidivada is a village in Gurtedu mandal, Polavaram district in the state of Andhra Pradesh in India.

== Demographics ==
As of 2011 India census, this village had a population of 247, out of which 113 were male and 134 were female. The population of children below 6 years of age was 22%. The literacy rate of the village is 20%.
