= Edlakonda =

- village
- Interactive map of Edlakonda
- Location in Andhra Pradesh, India Edlakonda (India)
- Coordinates: 17.8455°N 81.9589°E
- Country: India
- State: Andhra Pradesh
- District: Polavaram
- Mandal: Gurtedu

Area
  - Total: 1.91 km^{2} (0.74 sq mi)

Population (2011)
  - Total: 194
  - Density: 102/km^{2} (260/sq mi)

Languages
  - Official: Telugu
- Time zone: UTC+5:30 (IST)

Edlakonda is a village in Gurtedu mandal, Polavaram district in the state of Andhra Pradesh in India.

== Demographics ==
As of 2011 India census, This Village had a population of 194, out of which 94 were male and 100 were female. Population of children below 6 years of age were 17%. The literacy rate of the village is 42%.
