= Ammapeta =

- village
- Interactive map of Ammapeta
- Location in Andhra Pradesh, India Ammapeta (India)
- Coordinates: 17.6582°N 82.4494°E
- Country: India
- State: Andhra Pradesh
- District: East Godavari

Area
  - Total: 0.15 km^{2} (0.058 sq mi)

Population (2011)
  - Total: 54
  - Density: 360/km^{2} (930/sq mi)

Languages
  - Official: Telugu
- Time zone: UTC+5:30 (IST)

Ammapeta is a village in Y. Ramavaram Mandal, East Godavari district in the state of Andhra Pradesh in India.

== Demographics ==
As of 2011 India census, This Village had a population of 54, out of which 26 were male and 28 were female. Population of children below 6 years of age were 15%. The literacy rate of the village is 35%.
