= Dubela, Gurtedu mandal =

Dubela
- village
- Interactive map of Dubela
- Location in Andhra Pradesh, India Dubela (India)
- Coordinates: 17.9051°N 81.8871°E
- Country: India
- State: Andhra Pradesh
- District: Polavaram
- Mandal: Gurtedu

Area
  - Total: 0.05 km^{2} (0.019 sq mi)

Population (2011)
  - Total: 50
  - Density: 1,000/km^{2} (2,600/sq mi)

Languages
  - Official: Telugu
- Time zone: UTC+5:30 (IST)

Dubela is a village in Gurtedu mandal, Polavaram district in the state of Andhra Pradesh in India.

== Demographics ==
As of 2011 India census, This Village had a population of 50, out of which 23 were male and 27 were female. Population of children below 6 years of age were 18%. The literacy rate of the village is 10%.
