= Kanivada =

- village
- Interactive map of Kanivada
- Location in Andhra Pradesh, India Kanivada (India)
- Coordinates: 17°47′53″N 81°51′05″E
- Country: India
- State: Andhra Pradesh
- District: Polavaram
- Mandal: Gurtedu

Area
  - Total: 0.27 km^{2} (0.10 sq mi)

Population (2011)
  - Total: 464
  - Density: 1,719/km^{2} (4,450/sq mi)

Languages
  - Official: Telugu
- Time zone: UTC+5:30 (IST)

Kanivada is a village in Gurtedu mandal, Polavaram district in the state of Andhra Pradesh in India.

== Demographics ==
As of 2011 India census, This Village had a population of 464, out of which 202 were male and 262 were female. Population of children below 6 years of age were 18%. The literacy rate of the village is 28%.
