= Jalagalova =

- village
- Interactive map of Jalagalova
- Location in Andhra Pradesh, India Jalagalova (India)
- Coordinates: 17.8008°N 81.8434°E
- Country: India
- State: Andhra Pradesh
- District: Polavaram
- Mandal: Gurtedu

Area
  - Total: 0.12 km^{2} (0.046 sq mi)

Population (2011)
  - Total: 174
  - Density: 1,450/km^{2} (3,800/sq mi)

Languages
  - Official: Telugu
- Time zone: UTC+5:30 (IST)

Jalagalova is a village in Gurtedu mandal, Polavaram district in the state of Andhra Pradesh in India.

== Demographics ==
As of 2011 India census, This Village had a population of 174, out of which 84 were male and 90 were female. Population of children below 6 years of age were 15%. The literacy rate of the village is 18%.
