= Koramatigondi =

- village
- Interactive map of Koramatigondi
- Location in Andhra Pradesh, India Koramatigondi (India)
- Coordinates: 17.7927°N 81.8732°E
- Country: India
- State: Andhra Pradesh
- District: Polavaram
- Mandal: Gurtedu

Area
  - Total: 0.04 km^{2} (0.015 sq mi)

Population (2011)
  - Total: 80
  - Density: 2,000/km^{2} (5,200/sq mi)

Languages
  - Official: Telugu
- Time zone: UTC+5:30 (IST)

Koramatigondi is a village in Gurtedu mandal, Polavaram district in the state of Andhra Pradesh in India.

== Demographics ==
As of 2011 India census, This Village had a population of 80, out of which 44 were male and 36 were female. Population of children below 6 years of age were 26%. The literacy rate of the village is 5%.
