= Goppulathotamamidi =

- village
- Interactive map of Goppulathotamamidi
- Location in Andhra Pradesh, India Goppulathotamamidi (India)
- Coordinates: 17.8452°N 81.8565°E
- Country: India
- State: Andhra Pradesh
- District: Polavaram
- Mandal: Gurtedu

Area
  - Total: 0.01 km^{2} (0.0039 sq mi)

Population (2011)
  - Total: 128
  - Density: 12,800/km^{2} (33,000/sq mi)

Languages
  - Official: Telugu
- Time zone: UTC+5:30 (IST)

Goppulathotamamidi is a village in Gurtedu mandal, Polavaram district in the state of Andhra Pradesh in India.

== Demographics ==
As of 2011 India census, This Village had a population of 128, out of which 57 were male and 71 were female. Population of children below 6 years of age were 20%. The literacy rate of the village is 2%.
