= Kothapakalu =

- village
- Interactive map of Kothapakalu
- Location in Andhra Pradesh, India Kothapakalu (India)
- Coordinates: 17.4508°N 81.7732°E
- Country: India
- State: Andhra Pradesh
- District: Polavaram
- Mandal: Gurtedu

Area
  - Total: 0.33 km^{2} (0.13 sq mi)

Population (2011)
  - Total: 115
  - Density: 348/km^{2} (900/sq mi)

Languages
  - Official: Telugu
- Time zone: UTC+5:30 (IST)

Kothapakalu is a village in Gurtedu mandal, Polavaram district in the state of Andhra Pradesh in India.

== Demographics ==
As of 2011 India census, This Village had a population of 115, out of which 42 were male and 73 were female. Population of children below 6 years of age were 10%. The literacy rate of the village is 18%.
