= Ganganuru =

- village
- Interactive map of Ganganuru
- Location in Andhra Pradesh, India Ganganuru (India)
- Coordinates: 17.9176°N 82.0162°E
- Country: India
- State: Andhra Pradesh
- District: East Godavari

Area
  - Total: 0.04 km^{2} (0.015 sq mi)

Population (2011)
  - Total: 102
  - Density: 2,550/km^{2} (6,600/sq mi)

Languages
  - Official: Telugu
- Time zone: UTC+5:30 (IST)

Ganganuru is a village in Y. Ramavaram Mandal, East Godavari district in the state of Andhra Pradesh in India.

== Demographics ==
As of 2011 India census, This Village had a population of 102, out of which 48 were male and 54 were female. Population of children below 6 years of age were 31%. The literacy rate of the village is 43%.
