= Indukurupeta, Devipatnam Mandal =

Indukurupeta
- village
- Interactive map of Indukurupeta
- Location in Andhra Pradesh, India Indukurupeta (India)
- Coordinates: 17.2411°N 81.7866°E
- Country: India
- State: Andhra Pradesh
- District: Alluri Sitharama Raju

Area
  - Total: 2 km^{2} (0.77 sq mi)

Population (2011)
  - Total: 3,291
  - Density: 1,406/km^{2} (3,640/sq mi)

Languages
  - Official: Telugu
- Time zone: UTC+5:30 (IST)
- Postal code: 533 446

Indukurupeta is a village in Devipatnam Mandal, Alluri Sitharama Raju district in the state of Andhra Pradesh in India.

== Geography ==
Indukurupeta is located at 17.2411°N 81.7866°E.

== Demographics ==
As of 2011 India census, Indukurupeta had a population of 3291, out of which 1624 were male and 1667 were female. The population of children below 6 years of age was 9%. The literacy rate of the village was 60%.
