= Balijapadu =

Village in Andhra Pradesh, India

- village
- Interactive map of Balijapadu
- Location in Andhra Pradesh, India Balijapadu (India)
- Coordinates: 17.3518°N 82.1685°E
- Country: India
- State: Andhra Pradesh
- District: Alluri Sitharama Raju

Area
  - Total: 3 km^{2} (1.2 sq mi)

Population (2011)
  - Total: 564
  - Density: 170/km^{2} (440/sq mi)

Languages
  - Official: Telugu
- Time zone: UTC+5:30 (IST)
- Postal code: 533 446

Balijapadu is a village in Rajavommangi Mandal, Alluri Sitharama Raju district in the state of Andhra Pradesh in India.

== Geography ==
Balijapadu is located at 17.3518°N 82.1685°E.

== Demographics ==
As of 2011 India census, Balijapadu had a population of 564, out of which 282 were male and 282 were female. The population of children below 6 years of age was 11%. The literacy rate of the village was 53%.
