= Kadarikota =

Village in India

- village
- Interactive map of Kadarikota
- Location in Andhra Pradesh, India Kadarikota (India)
- Coordinates: 17.8397°N 81.9379°E
- Country: India
- State: Andhra Pradesh
- District: Polavaram
- Mandal: Gurtedu

Area
  - Total: 0.11 km^{2} (0.042 sq mi)

Population (2011)
  - Total: 218
  - Density: 1,982/km^{2} (5,130/sq mi)

Languages
  - Official: Telugu
- Time zone: UTC+5:30 (IST)

Kadarikota is a village in Gurtedu mandal, Polavaram district in the state of Andhra Pradesh in India.

== Demographics ==
As of 2011 India census, This Village had a population of 218, out of which 113 were male and 105 were female. Population of children below 6 years of age were 13%. The literacy rate of the village is 38%.
