= Pudipalli =

Coordinates: 17.2987°N 81.6942°E

Pudipalli is a village located in the Devipatnam Mandal in Alluri Sitharama Raju district of Andhra Pradesh, India. The village sits on the slope of a small hill located on the banks of Godavari River.

== Demographics ==
The village consists of about 350 houses and has a population of 1048. Its primary industry is agriculture. The nearest city to Pudipalli village is Rajahmundry, around 43 kilometers away.
