= Panasalova =

- village
- Interactive map of Panasalova
- Location in Andhra Pradesh, India Panasalova (India)
- Coordinates: 17.8425°N 81.8400°E
- Country: India
- State: Andhra Pradesh
- District: Polavaram
- Mandal: Gurtedu

Area
  - Total: 0.02 km^{2} (0.0077 sq mi)

Population (2011)
  - Total: 63
  - Density: 3,150/km^{2} (8,200/sq mi)

Languages
  - Official: Telugu
- Time zone: UTC+5:30 (IST)

Panasalova is a village in Gurtedu mandal, Polavaram district in the state of Andhra Pradesh in India.

== Demographics ==
As of 2011 India census, This Village had a population of 63, out of which 33 were male and 30 were female. Population of children below 6 years of age were 25%. The literacy rate of the village is 1%.
