= Rajavommangi mandal =

- Mandal
- Interactive map outlining mandal
- Country: India
- State: Andhra Pradesh
- District: Polavaram
- Population according to 2011 census: 39,582
- Number of villages: 62
- Area in Sq Km: 465.41
- Headquarters: Rajavommangi
- Time zone: UTC+5:30 (IST)

Rajavommangi mandal is one of the 12 mandals in Polavaram district of Andhra Pradesh. Its headquarters is the village of Rajavommangi. At the time of the 2011 census there were 62 villages in this mandal.

== Demographics ==
Rajavommangi mandal had a total population of 39,582 at the time of the 2011 census, out of which 19,102 were male while 20,480 were female. The average sex ratio was 1072. The total literacy rate was 56%.

== Towns and villages ==
=== Villages ===
1. Aminabada
2. Ammirekala
3. Ananthagiri
4. Appannapalem
5. Badadanampalle
6. Balijapadu
7. Bodlagondi
8. Bonangipalem
9. Bornagudem
10. Boyapadu
11. Chervukommupalem
12. Chikilinta
13. Chinarellangipadu
14. Dakarayi
15. Damanapalem
16. Donelapalem
17. Dongala Mallavaram
18. Dusaripamu
19. G Sarabhavaram
20. Gaduvakurthi
21. Ginjerthi
22. Gobbilamadugu
23. Jaddangi
24. Jeelugulapadu
25. Karudevipalem
26. Kesavaram
27. Kimiligedda
28. Kindra
29. Kirrabu
30. Komarapuram
31. Kondalingamparthi
32. Kondapalle
33. Kothapalle
34. Labbarthi
35. Lagarayi
36. Lododdi
37. Maredubaka
38. Marripalem
39. Munjavarappadu
40. Murlavanipalem
41. Nellimetla
42. Pakavelthi
43. Pedagarrangi
44. Pedarellangipadu
45. Pudedu
46. Rajavommangi
47. Revatipalem
48. Sarabhavaram
49. Singampalle
50. Subbampadu
51. Surampalem
52. Tallapalem
53. Thantikonda
54. Urlakulapadu
55. Vanakarayi
56. Vanchangi
57. Vatangi
58. Velagalapalem
59. Vogipalem
60. Vokurthi
61. Voyyedu
62. Yerrampadu

== See also ==
- List of mandals in Andhra Pradesh
