= Gondikota =

- village
- Interactive map of Gondikota
- Location in Andhra Pradesh, India Gondikota (India)
- Coordinates: 17.8708°N 81.8894°E
- Country: India
- State: Andhra Pradesh
- District: Polavaram
- Mandal: Gurtedu

Area
  - Total: 0.03 km^{2} (0.012 sq mi)

Population (2011)
  - Total: 61
  - Density: 2,033/km^{2} (5,270/sq mi)

Languages
  - Official: Telugu
- Time zone: UTC+5:30 (IST)

Gondikota is a village in Gurtedu mandal, Polavaram district in the state of Andhra Pradesh in India.

== Demographics ==
As of 2011 India census, This Village had a population of 61, out of which 26 were male and 35 were female. Population of children below 6 years of age were 31%. The literacy rate of the village is 12%.
