= Buradavalasa =

- village
- Interactive map of Buradavalasa
- Location in Andhra Pradesh, India Buradavalasa (India)
- Coordinates: 17.7992°N 81.8934°E
- Country: India
- State: Andhra Pradesh
- District: Polavaram
- Mandal: Gurtedu

Area
  - Total: 0.01 km^{2} (0.0039 sq mi)

Population (2011)
  - Total: 107
  - Density: 10,700/km^{2} (28,000/sq mi)

Languages
  - Official: Telugu
- Time zone: UTC+5:30 (IST)

Buradavalasa is a village in Gurtedu mandal, Polavaram district in the state of Andhra Pradesh in India.

== Demographics ==
As of 2011 India census, This Village had a population of 107, out of which 53 were male and 54 were female. Population of children below 6 years of age were 20%. The literacy rate of the village is 8%.
