= Daragedda =

- village
- Interactive map of Daragedda
- Location in Andhra Pradesh, India Daragedda (India)
- Coordinates: 17.8265°N 81.9410°E
- Country: India
- State: Andhra Pradesh
- District: Polavaram
- Mandal: Gurtedu

Area
  - Total: 0.42 km^{2} (0.16 sq mi)

Population (2011)
  - Total: 266
  - Density: 633/km^{2} (1,640/sq mi)

Languages
  - Official: Telugu
- Time zone: UTC+5:30 (IST)

Daragedda is a village in Gurtedu mandal, Polavaram district in the state of Andhra Pradesh in India.

== Demographics ==
As of 2011 India census, This Village had a population of 266, out of which 61 were male and 205 were female. Population of children below 6 years of age were 5%. The literacy rate of the village is 90%.
