= Chinturu mandal =

Chintoor mandal Chinturu mandal
- Mandal
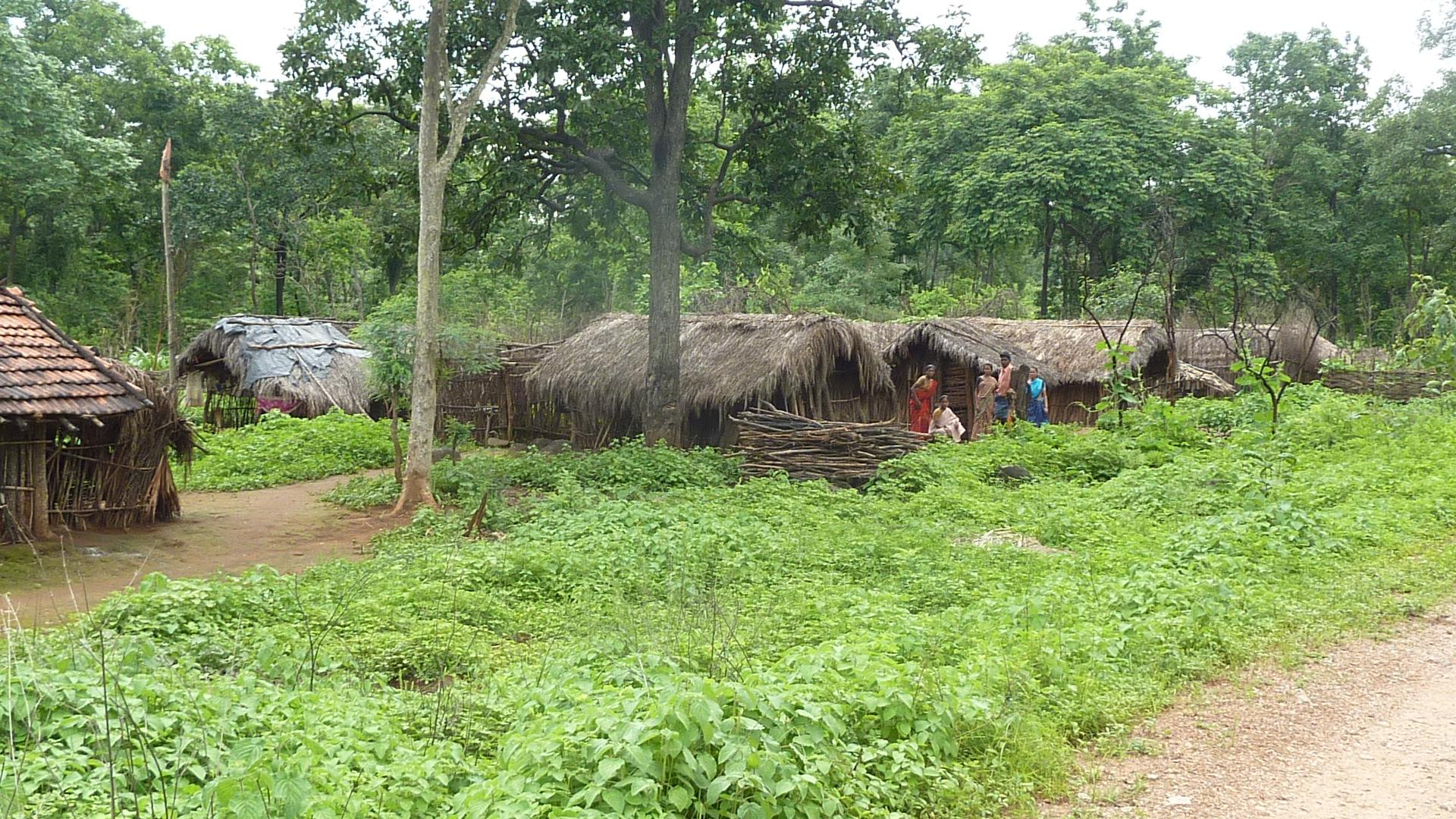
- Settlements near Chintoor
- Interactive map of Chintoor mandal
- Location in Andhra Pradesh, India Chintoor mandal (India)
- Coordinates: 17.75°N 81.4°E
- Country: India
- State: Andhra Pradesh
- District: Polavaram
- Headquarters: Chinturu
- Elevation: 35 m (115 ft)

Languages
  - Official: Telugu
  - Indigenous: Koya
- Time zone: UTC+5:30 (IST)
- Postal code: 507126
- Vehicle registration: AP
- Climate: Hot (Köppen)

Chintoor mandal or Chinturu mandal is a mandal in Polavaram district of the Indian state Andhra Pradesh. It is the headquarters of Chinturu revenue division with Nellipaka, Chinturu, Kunavaram and Vararamachandrapuram mandals.

== Geography ==
Chinturu has an average elevation of 35 metres (115 ft). Geo Coordinates: 17° 44' N 81° 23' E. Chinturu is situated besides the Sabari river. The Sabari is a sub river of the Godavari river.

Tribals trek about 30 km daily for livelihood in this region.

== See also ==
List of mandals in Andhra Pradesh
