= Boddumamidi =

- village
- బొడ్డుమామిడి
- Interactive map of Boddumamidi
- Location in Andhra Pradesh, India Boddumamidi (India)
- Coordinates: 17.9222°N 82.4953°E
- Country: India
- State: Andhra Pradesh
- District: Alluri Sitharama Raju
- Talukas: Donkarayi

Area
  - Total: 4.65 km^{2} (1.80 sq mi)

Population (2011)
  - Total: 180
  - Density: 39/km^{2} (100/sq mi)

Languages
  - Official: Telugu, Odia
- Time zone: UTC+5:30 (IST)
- Postal code: 533348
- Vehicle registration: AP

Boddumamidi is a village in Donkarayi Mandal Alluri Sitharama Raju district in the state of Andhra Pradesh in India.

== Demographics ==
As per the 2011 Indian census, the village had a population of 180, out of which 89 were male and 91 were female. Population of children below 6 years of age were 14%. The literacy rate of the village is 39%.
