= Irlavada =

- village
- Interactive map of Irlavada
- Location in Andhra Pradesh, India Irlavada (India)
- Coordinates: 17.7863°N 81.8918°E
- Country: India
- State: Andhra Pradesh
- District: Polavaram
- Mandal: Gurtedu

Area
  - Total: 0.65 km^{2} (0.25 sq mi)

Population (2011)
  - Total: 151
  - Density: 232/km^{2} (600/sq mi)

Languages
  - Official: Telugu
- Time zone: UTC+5:30 (IST)

Irlavada is a village in Gurtedu mandal, Polavaram district in the state of Andhra Pradesh in India.

== Demographics ==
As of 2011 India census, This Village had a population of 151, out of which 73 were male and 78 were female. Population of children below 6 years of age were 9%. The literacy rate of the village is 12%.
