= Dumpavalasa =

- village
- Interactive map of Dumpavalasa
- Location in Andhra Pradesh, India Dumpavalasa (India)
- Coordinates: 17.7607°N 81.8668°E
- Country: India
- State: Andhra Pradesh
- District: Polavaram
- Mandal: Gurtedu

Area
  - Total: 0.44 km^{2} (0.17 sq mi)

Population (2011)
  - Total: 355
  - Density: 807/km^{2} (2,090/sq mi)

Languages
  - Official: Telugu
- Time zone: UTC+5:30 (IST)

Dumpavalasa is a village in Gurtedu mandal, Polavaram district in the state of Andhra Pradesh in India.

== Demographics ==
As of 2011 India census, this village had a population of 355, out of which 168 were male and 187 were female. Population of children below 6 years of age was 21%. The literacy rate of the village is 20%.
