= Polamanugondi =

- village
- Interactive map of Polamanugondi
- Location in Andhra Pradesh, India Polamanugondi (India)
- Coordinates: 17.8087°N 81.8682°E
- Country: India
- State: Andhra Pradesh
- District: Polavaram
- Mandal: Gurtedu

Population (2011)
  - Total: 114

Languages
  - Official: Telugu
- Time zone: UTC+5:30 (IST)

Polamanugondi is a village in Gurtedu mandal, Polavaram district in the state of Andhra Pradesh in India.

== Demographics ==
As of 2011 India census, This Village had a population of 114, out of which 51 were male and 63 were female. Population of children below 6 years of age were 18.42%. The literacy rate of the village is 20.43%.
