= Chilakaveedhilanka =

- village
- Interactive map of Chilakaveedhilanka
- Location in Andhra Pradesh, India Chilakaveedhilanka (India)
- Coordinates: 17.8634°N 81.9859°E
- Country: India
- State: Andhra Pradesh
- District: Polavaram
- Mandal: Gurtedu

Area
  - Total: 1.45 km^{2} (0.56 sq mi)

Population (2011)
  - Total: 236
  - Density: 163/km^{2} (420/sq mi)

Languages
  - Official: Telugu
- Time zone: UTC+5:30 (IST)

Chilakaveedhilanka is a village in Gurtedu mandal, Polavaram district in the state of Andhra Pradesh in India.

== Demographics ==
As of 2011 India census, This Village had a population of 236, out of which 105 were male and 131 were female. Population of children below 6 years of age were 16%. The literacy rate of the village is 26%.
