= Gannavaram, Y. Ramavaram Mandal =

Gannavaram
- village
- Interactive map of Gannavaram
- Location in Andhra Pradesh, India Gannavaram (India)
- Coordinates: 17.8990°N 82.0572°E
- Country: India
- State: Andhra Pradesh
- District: East Godavari

Area
  - Total: 0.63 km^{2} (0.24 sq mi)

Population (2011)
  - Total: 17
  - Density: 27/km^{2} (70/sq mi)

Languages
  - Official: Telugu
- Time zone: UTC+5:30 (IST)

Gannavaram is a village in Y. Ramavaram Mandal, East Godavari district in the Indian state of Andhra Pradesh.

== Demographics ==
As of 2011 India census, This Village had a population of `17, out of which 7 were male and 10 were female. Population of children below 6 years of age were 29%. The literacy rate of the village is 8%.
