= Kallepugonda =

- village
- Interactive map of Kallepugonda
- Location in Andhra Pradesh, India Kallepugonda (India)
- Coordinates: 17.9149°N 81.9295°E
- Country: India
- State: Andhra Pradesh
- District: Polavaram
- Mandal: Gurtedu

Area
  - Total: 0.85 km^{2} (0.33 sq mi)

Population (2011)
  - Total: 182
  - Density: 214/km^{2} (550/sq mi)

Languages
  - Official: Telugu
- Time zone: UTC+5:30 (IST)

Kallepugonda is a village in Gurtedu mandal, Polavaram district in the state of Andhra Pradesh in India.

== Demographics ==
As of 2011 India census, This Village had a population of 182, out of which 78 were male and 104 were female. Population of children below 6 years of age were 22%. The literacy rate of the village is 26%.
