= G.Vattigedda =

- village
- Interactive map of G.Vattigedda
- Location in Andhra Pradesh, India G.Vattigedda (India)
- Coordinates: 17.8138°N 81.9121°E
- Country: India
- State: Andhra Pradesh
- District: Polavaram
- Mandal: Gurtedu

Area
  - Total: 1.07 km^{2} (0.41 sq mi)

Population (2011)
  - Total: 182
  - Density: 170/km^{2} (440/sq mi)

Languages
  - Official: Telugu
- Time zone: UTC+5:30 (IST)

G.Vattigedda is a village in Gurtedu mandal, Polavaram district in the state of Andhra Pradesh in India.

== Demographics ==
As of 2011 India census, This Village had a population of 182, out of which 80 were male and 102 were female. Population of children below 6 years of age were 13%. The literacy rate of the village is 50%.
