= Buradakota =

- village
- Interactive map of Buradakota
- Location in Andhra Pradesh, India Buradakota (India)
- Coordinates: 17.3530°N 82.2351°E
- Country: India
- State: Andhra Pradesh
- District: East Godavari

Area
  - Total: 1.45 km^{2} (0.56 sq mi)

Population (2011)
  - Total: 150
  - Density: 103/km^{2} (270/sq mi)

Languages
  - Official: Telugu
- Time zone: UTC+5:30 (IST)

Buradakota is a village in Y. Ramavaram Mandal, East Godavari district in the state of Andhra Pradesh in India.

== Demographics ==
As of 2011 India census, This Village had a population of 150, out of which 75 were male and 75 were female. Population of children below 6 years of age were 11%. The literacy rate of the village is 26%.
