= Poolova =

- village
- Interactive map of Poolova
- Location in Andhra Pradesh, India Poolova (India)
- Coordinates: 17.8284°N 81.8698°E
- Country: India
- State: Andhra Pradesh
- District: Polavaram
- Mandal: Gurtedu

Population (2011)
  - Total: 162

Languages
  - Official: Telugu
- Time zone: UTC+5:30 (IST)

Poolova is a village in Gurtedu mandal, Polavaram district in the state of Andhra Pradesh in India.

== Demographics ==
As of 2011 India census, This Village had a population of 162, out of which 64 were male and 98 were female. Population of children below 6 years of age was 21.6%. The literacy rate of the village was 67.02%.
