= Chanaganuru =

- village
- Interactive map of Chanaganuru
- Location in Andhra Pradesh, India Chanaganuru (India)
- Coordinates: 17.8579°N 82.0114°E
- Country: India
- State: Andhra Pradesh
- District: Polavaram
- Mandal: Gurtedu

Area
  - Total: 4.86 km^{2} (1.88 sq mi)

Population (2011)
  - Total: 257
  - Density: 53/km^{2} (140/sq mi)

Languages
  - Official: Telugu
- Time zone: UTC+5:30 (IST)

Chanaganuru is a village in Gurtedu mandal, Polavaram district in the state of Andhra Pradesh in India.

== Demographics ==
As of 2011 India census, This Village had a population of 257, out of which 124 were male and 133 were female. Population of children below 6 years of age were 17%. The literacy rate of the village is 9%.
