= Sarabhavaram, Rajavommangi Mandal =

Village in Andhra Pradesh, India

Sarabhavaram
- village
- Interactive map of Sarabhavaram
- Location in Andhra Pradesh, India Sarabhavaram (India)
- Coordinates: 17.2713°N 82.2401°E
- Country: India
- State: Andhra Pradesh
- District: Alluri Sitharama Raju

Area
  - Total: 4 km^{2} (1.5 sq mi)

Population (2011)
  - Total: 615
  - Density: 147/km^{2} (380/sq mi)

Languages
  - Official: Telugu
- Time zone: UTC+5:30 (IST)
- Postal code: 533 446

Sarabhavaram is a village in Rajavommangi Mandal, Alluri Sitharama Raju district in the state of Andhra Pradesh in India.

== Geography ==
Sarabhavaram is located at 17.2713°N 82.2401°E.

== Demographics ==
As of 2011 India census, Sarabhavaram had a population of 615, out of which 273 were male and 342 were female. The population of children below 6 years of age was 6%. The literacy rate of the village was 55%.
