= Busikota =

- village
- Interactive map of Busikota
- Location in Andhra Pradesh, India Busikota (India)
- Coordinates: 17°47′26″N 81°52′36″E
- Country: India
- State: Andhra Pradesh
- District: Polavaram
- Mandal: Gurtedu

Area
  - Total: 0.32 km^{2} (0.12 sq mi)

Population (2011)
  - Total: 135
  - Density: 422/km^{2} (1,090/sq mi)

Languages
  - Official: Telugu
- Time zone: UTC+5:30 (IST)

Busikota is a village in Gurtedu mandal, Polavaram district in the state of Andhra Pradesh in India.

== Demographics ==
As of 2011 India census, This Village had a population of 135, out of which 65 were male and 70 were female. Population of children below 6 years of age were 19%. The literacy rate of the village is 10%.
