= Koppulakota =

- village
- Interactive map of Koppulakota
- Location in Andhra Pradesh, India Koppulakota (India)
- Coordinates: 17.9213°N 82.0034°E
- Country: India
- State: Andhra Pradesh
- District: Polavaram
- Mandal: Gurtedu

Area
  - Total: 0.49 km^{2} (0.19 sq mi)

Population (2011)
  - Total: 359
  - Density: 733/km^{2} (1,900/sq mi)

Languages
  - Official: Telugu
- Time zone: UTC+5:30 (IST)

Koppulakota is a village in Gurtedu mandal, Polavaram district in the state of Andhra Pradesh in India.

== Demographics ==
As of 2011 India census, This Village had a population of 359, out of which 173 were male and 186 were female. Population of children below 6 years of age were 19%. The literacy rate of the village is 38%.
