= Rampachodavaram =

- Census Town
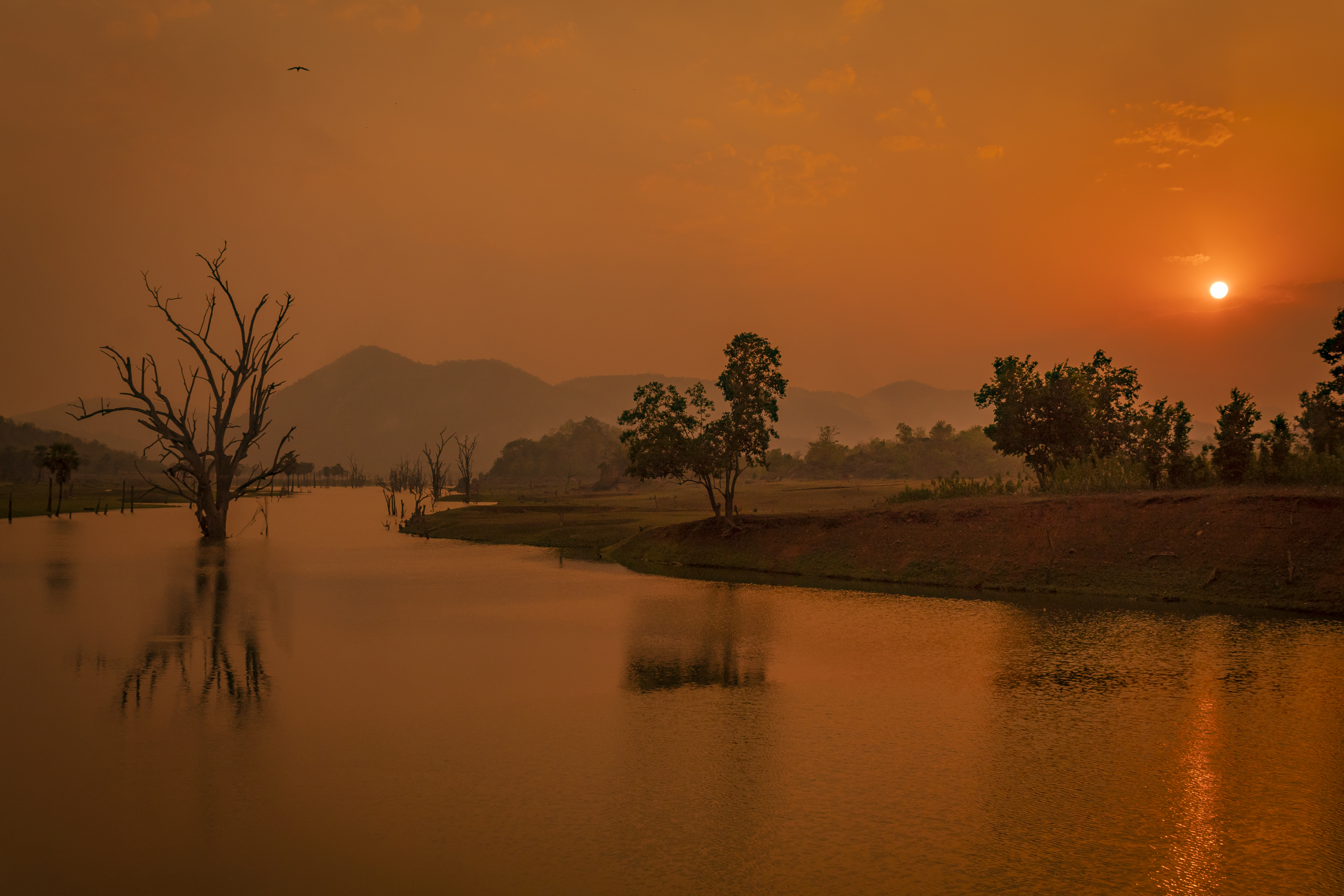
- Bhupathipalem Reservoir, Rampachodavaram

- Location in Andhra Pradesh, India
- Coordinates: 17°26′18.657″N 81°46′38.743″E
- Country: India
- State: Andhra Pradesh
- District: Polavaram

Government
  - MLA: Miriyala Sirisha Devi

Area
  - Total: 4.99 km^{2} (1.93 sq mi)
- Elevation: 162 m (531 ft)

Population (2011)
  - Total: 9,952
  - Density: 1,990/km^{2} (5,170/sq mi)

Languages
  - Official: Telugu
- Time zone: UTC+5:30 (IST)
- Postal code: 533288
- Vehicle Registration: AP05 (Former); AP39 (from 30 January 2019)

Rampachodavaram is headquarters of Polavaram district of the Indian state of Andhra Pradesh. It is located in Rampachodavaram mandal of Rampachodavaram revenue division. Rampachodavaram is known for its dense jungle and waterfalls which can be accessed by road transport only.

== Geography ==
Chodavaram is located at 17.4500°N 81.7667°E. It has an average elevation of 162 metres (534 ft).

== Demographics ==
As of 2011 Census of India, Rampachodavaram had a population of 9,952 with 2,485 households. The total population constitute, 5,242 males and 4,710 females —a sex ratio of 899 females per 1000 males. 943 children are in the age group of 0–6 years, of which 458 are boys and 485 are girls, —a ratio of 1059 per 1000. The average literacy rate stands at 84.50% with 7,613 literates, significantly higher than the state average of 67.41%.

== Transport ==
State run APSRTC runs bus services from Rajamahendravaram to Rampachodavarm. It is 40km from Rajamahendravaram Airport

== See also ==
- List of census towns in Andhra Pradesh
