= Mangampadu =

- Village
- మంగంపాడు
- Interactive map of Mangampadu
- Location in Andhra Pradesh, India Mangampadu (India)
- Coordinates: 17.965344°N 81.898216°E
- Country: India
- State: Andhra Pradesh
- District: Polavaram
- Mandal: Gurtedu

Languages
  - Official: Telugu, Odia
- Time zone: UTC+5:30 (IST)
- PIN: 533348
- Vehicle registration: AP

Mangampadu is a village in Gurtedu mandal in Polavaram district, Andhra Pradesh state, India.
