= Gurtedu =

- village
- Interactive map of Gurtedu
- Location in Andhra Pradesh, India Gurtedu (India)
- Coordinates: 17.8880°N 81.9480°E
- Country: India
- State: Andhra Pradesh
- District: Polavaram

Area
  - Total: 2.08 km^{2} (0.80 sq mi)

Population (2011)
  - Total: 475
  - Density: 228/km^{2} (590/sq mi)

Languages
  - Official: Telugu
- Time zone: UTC+5:30 (IST)

Gurtedu is a village in Gurtedu mandal, Polavaram district in the state of Andhra Pradesh in India.

== Demographics ==
As of 2011 India census, This Village had a population of 475, out of which 309 were male and 166 were female. Population of children below 6 years of age were 11%. The literacy rate of the village is 77%.
