= Donkarayi =

Donkarayi డోంకరాయి
- Village
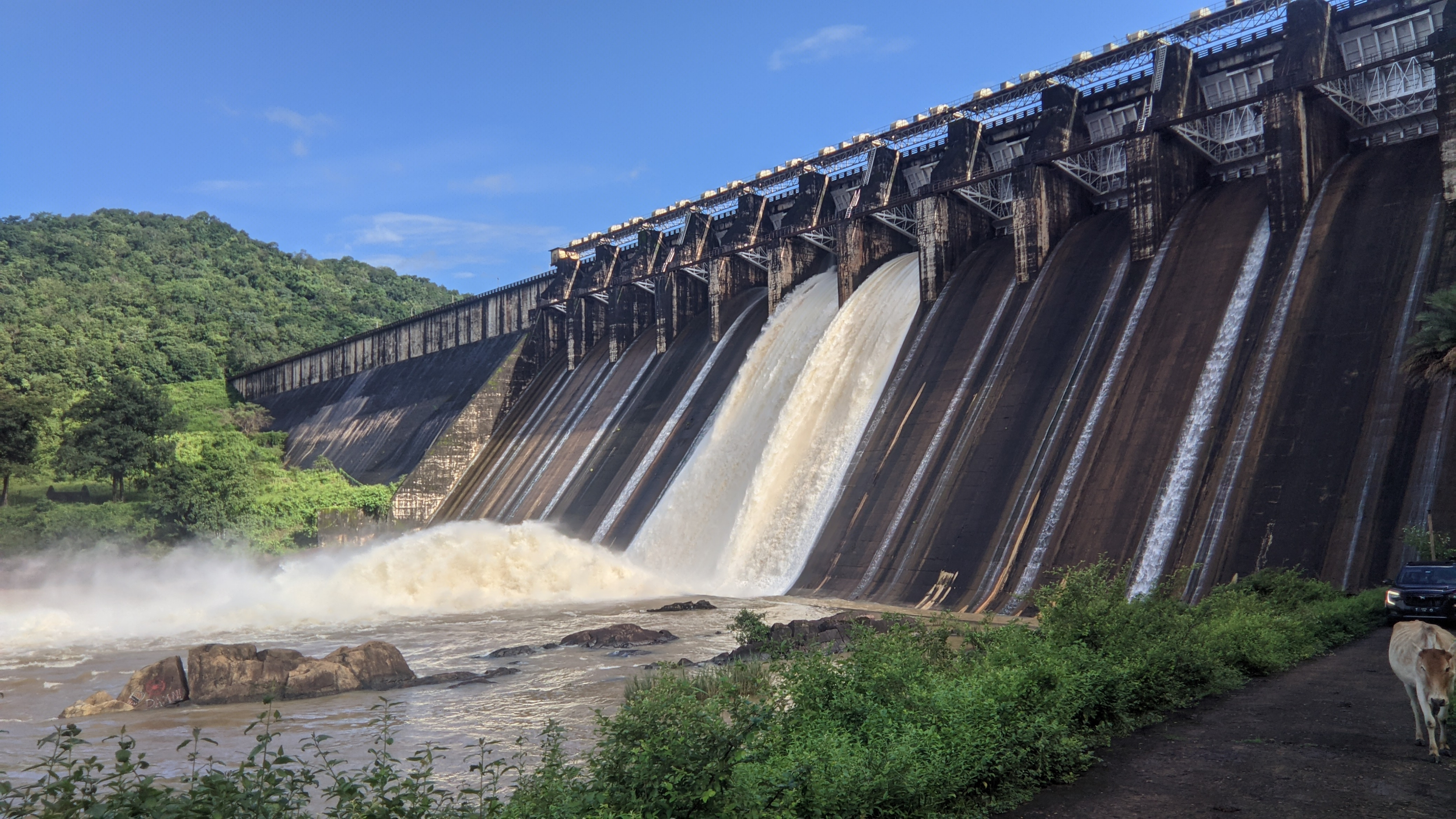
- Donkarayi Dam And Reservoir
- Interactive map of Donkarayi
- Location in Andhra Pradesh, India
- Coordinates: 17.933336°N 81.798851°E
- Country: India
- State: Andhra Pradesh
- Region: Uttarandhra
- District: Polavaram
- Mandal: Gurtedu

Government
  - Type: Gram Panchayat
  - Body: Gram panchayat

Area
  - Total: 0.35 km^{2} (0.14 sq mi)

Population (2011)
  - Total: 2,194
  - Density: 6,269/km^{2} (16,240/sq mi)

Languages
  - Official: Telugu Odia
- Time zone: UTC+5:30 (IST)
- PIN: 533348

Donkarayi or Donkarai is a village in Gurtedu Mandal in Polavaram district in the state of Andhra Pradesh in India. Bordered by Odisha & Near to Visakhapatnam, Araku Valley, Lambasingi, Bhadrachalam & Rajamahendravaram

== Demographics ==
According to the 2011 Indian census the village had a population of 2194, out of which 997 were male and 1197 were female. The percentage of children below 6 years of age was 12%. The literacy rate was 56%.
