= Chinturu revenue division =

Revenue division in Polavaram district, Andhra Pradesh, India

- revenue division in Polavaram district
- Country: India
- State: Andhra Pradesh
- District: Polavaram
- Formed: 31 December 2025
- Headquarters: Chinturu
- Time zone: UTC+05:30 (IST)

Chinturu revenue division is an administrative division in the Polavaram district of the Indian state of Andhra Pradesh. It is one of the two revenue divisions in the district and comprises four mandals. The division was formed on 31 December 2025 as part of the district consolidation and administrative reorganisation undertaken by the Government of Andhra Pradesh during the 2025 restructuring of districts.

== Administration ==
There are 4 mandals in Chinturu revenue division.

No.	Mandals
1	Chinturu mandal
2	Nellipaka mandal
3	Kunavaram mandal
4	Vara Ramachandrapuram mandal

== See also ==
- List of revenue divisions in Andhra Pradesh
- List of mandals in Andhra Pradesh
