= Boddagondi =

- village
- Interactive map of Boddagondi
- Location in Andhra Pradesh, India Boddagondi (India)
- Coordinates: 17.8682°N 81.8774°E
- Country: India
- State: Andhra Pradesh
- District: Polavaram
- Mandal: Gurtedu

Area
  - Total: 2.33 km^{2} (0.90 sq mi)

Population (2011)
  - Total: 250
  - Density: 107/km^{2} (280/sq mi)

Languages
  - Official: Telugu
- Time zone: UTC+5:30 (IST)

Boddagondi is a village in Gurtedu mandal, Polavaram district in the state of Andhra Pradesh in India.

== Demographics ==
According to the 2011 census of India, the village had a population of 250, with 125 males and 125 females. The population of children below the age of 6 years was 14%. The literacy rate in the village was 49%.
