= Devipatnam mandal =

- Mandal
- Interactive map of Devipatnam mandal
- Country: India
- State: Andhra Pradesh
- District: Polavaram
- Population according to 2011 census: 28,178
- Number of villages: 46
- Area in Sq Km: 517.39
- Headquarters: Devipatnam
- Time zone: UTC+5:30 (IST)

Devipatnam mandal is one of the 12 mandals in Polavaram district of Andhra Pradesh. Its headquarters is the village of Devipatnam. At the time of the 2011 census the mandal included 46 villages.

== Demographics ==
Devipatnam mandal had a total population of 28,178 per the 2011 census, out of which 13,669 are males while 14,509 are females. The average sex ratio is 1061. The total literacy rate is 60%.

== Towns and villages ==
=== Villages ===
- 1. A Veeravaram
- 2. Anguluru
- 3. China Ramanayyapeta
- 4. Chintalagudem
- 5. Choppakonda
- 6. Damanapalle
- 7. Dandangi
- 8. Devaram
- 9. Devipatnam
- 10. Donalanka
- 11. Gangavaram
- 12. Ganugulagondi
- 13. Gonduru
- 14. Gumpanapalle
- 15. Indukuru
- 16. Indukurupeta
- 17. Katchuluru
- 18. Kondamodalu
- 19. Kothagudem
- 20. Kothapalle
- 21. Kudakarayi
- 22. Lakshmipuram
- 23. Lingavaram
- 24. Lothupalem
- 25. Maddirathigudem
- 26. Mamidivalasa
- 27. Manturu
- 28. Mulagalagudem
- 29. Nelakota
- 30. Nereduvalasa
- 31. Paluru
- 32. Pamugandi
- 33. Peda Bheempalle
- 34. Peddanuthulu
- 35. Pedduru
- 36. Pothavaram
- 37. Pudipalli
- 38. Ravilanka
- 39. Rayavaram
- 40. Sarabhavaram
- 41. Thatiwada
- 42. Thoyyeru
- 43. Thummuru
- 44. V Ramannapalem
- 45. Velagapall
- 46. Yerrametla

== See also ==
- List of mandals in Andhra Pradesh
