= Gangavaram mandal =

- Mandal
- Interactive map of Gangavaram mandal
- Country: India
- State: Andhra Pradesh
- District: Polavaram district
- Headquarters: Gangavaram

Area
  - Total: 612.71 km^{2} (236.57 sq mi)
- Time zone: UTC+5:30 (IST)

Gangavaram mandal is one of the 12 mandals in Polavaram district of Andhra Pradesh. Its headquarters is the village of Gangavaram. At the time of the 2011 census there were 54 villages within the mandal.

== Demographics ==
Gangavaram mandal had a total population of 25,912 at the time of the 2011 census, out of which 12,393 were male while 13,519 were female, with an average sex ratio of 1,091. The total literacy rate of Gangavaram mandal was 53.06%. The male literacy rate was 49.33% and the female literacy rate was 44.9%.

== Towns and villages ==
=== Villages ===
1. Amudalabanda
2. B.Sivaramapatnam
3. Barrimamidi
4. Bayyanapalle
5. Cheedipalem
6. China Addapalle
7. Chinagarlapadu
8. Donelapalle
9. Doramamidi
10. E. Ramavaram
11. Gangavaram
12. Goragommi
13. Jaggampalem
14. Jiyyampalem
15. Kamavarappadu
16. Karakapadu
17. Komaravaram
18. Kondalampalem
19. Kothada
20. Kotharamavaram
21. Kuramgondi
22. Kusumarai
23. Lakkonda
24. Lakshmipuram
25. Loddipalem
26. Marripalem
27. Mohanapuram
28. Molleru
29. Neelavaram
30. Nellipudi
31. Nuvvumamidi
32. Ojubanda
33. Padagarlapadu
34. Pandrapottipalem
35. Pandraprolu
36. Patharamavaram
37. Peda Addapalle
38. Pidathamamidi
39. Pothandorapalem
40. Rajampalem
41. Rajavaram
42. Rajupetaloddi
43. Ramuldevapuram
44. Sarabhavaram
45. Surampalem
46. Ummetha
47. Vemulova
48. Vuyyalamadugu
49. Yamanapalle
50. Yellapuram
51. Yendapalle
52. Yerrampalem
53. Yetipalle
54. Zaderu

== See also ==
- List of mandals in Andhra Pradesh
