= Polavaram district =

District of Andhra Pradesh, India

- District of Andhra Pradesh
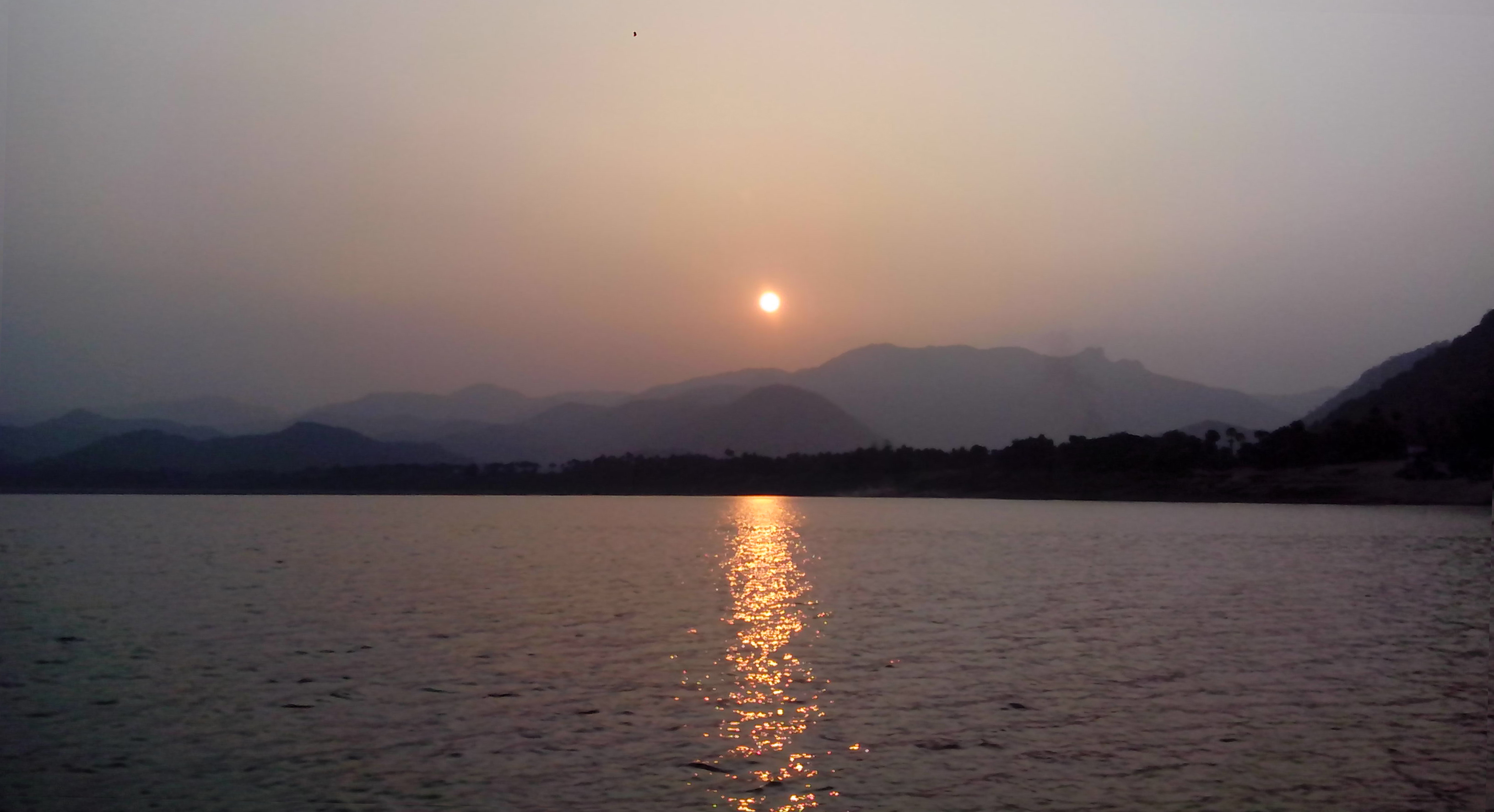
- Godavari at Papikonda National Park

- Polavaram district in Andhra Pradesh
- Interactive map of Polavaram district
- Coordinates: 17.439°N 81.775°E
- Country: India
- State: Andhra Pradesh
- Region: Godavari
- Formed: 31 December 2025
- Founder: Government of Andhra Pradesh
- Named for: Polavaram Project
- Headquarters: Rampachodavaram
- Population: 3,49,953
- Administrative Divisions: 2 revenue divisions Rampachodavaram, Chinturu; 12 Mandals

Government
  - District Collector: A.S. Dinesh Kumar I.A.S

Area
  - Total: 6,058 km^{2} (2,339 sq mi)

Languages
  - Official: Telugu

Literacy
- Time zone: UTC+05:30 (IST)
- District LGD code: 791
- Website: Official website

Polavaram district is a district in the Indian state of Andhra Pradesh. The headquarters of the district is located at Rampachodavaram.

== Etymology ==
This district is named after Polavaram Project which is an under-construction multi-purpose project on the Godavari River.

== History ==
On December 31, 2025, Rampachodavaram division was carved out of Alluri Sitharama Raju district. Earlier the district region was part of East Godavari district.

== Administrative divisions ==
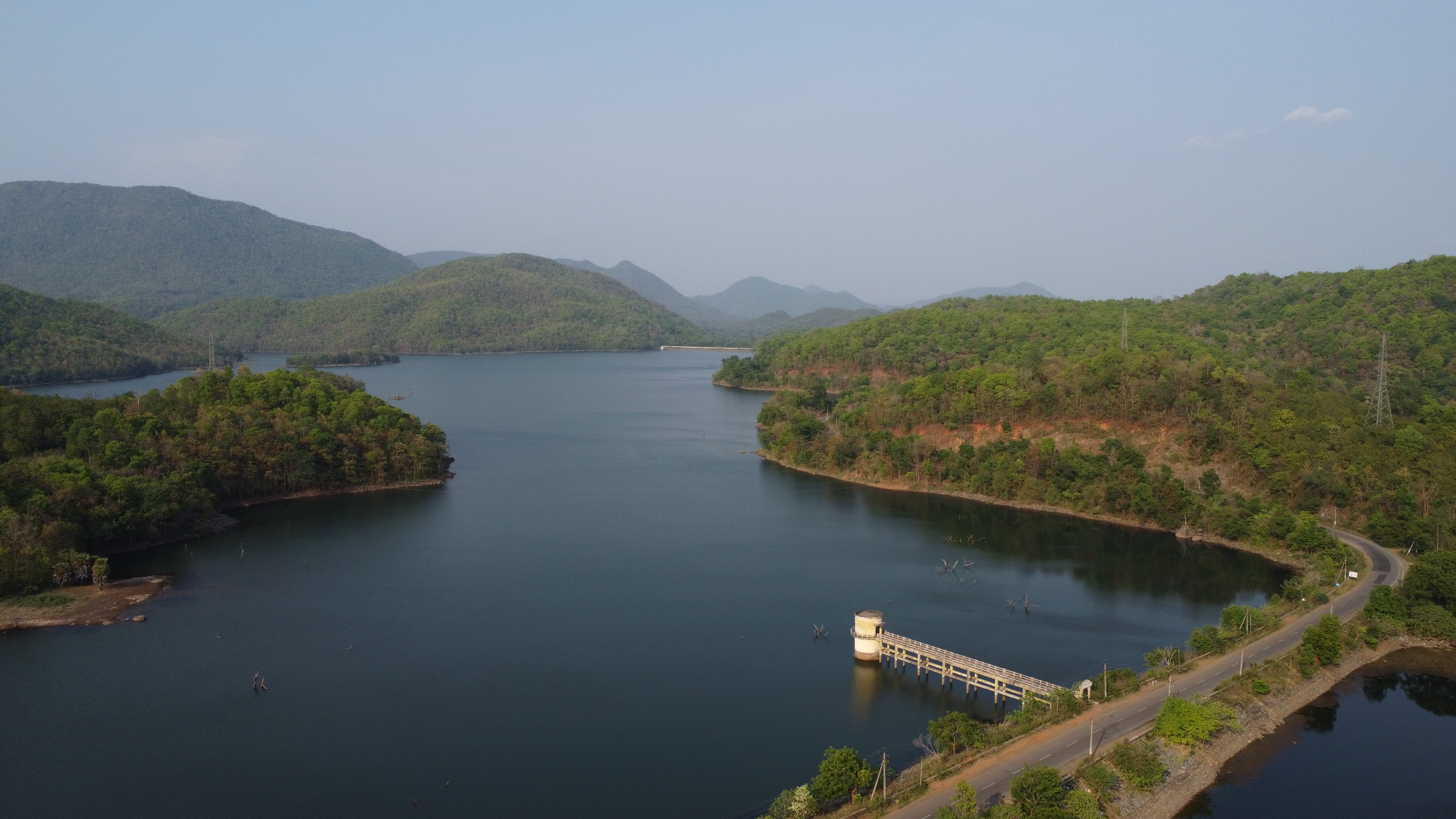
Bhupathipalem Reservoir aerial view

The district is divided into two revenue divisions, namely Rampachodavaram and Chinturu. These revenue divisions are further subdivided into a total of 12 mandals, each administered by a Tahsildar.

=== Mandals ===
The list of 12 mandals in Polavaram district, divided into 2 revenue divisions, is given below.

1. Chinturu revenue division
  1. Chinturu
  2. Nellipaka
  3. Kunavaram
  4. Vara Ramachandrapuram
2. Rampachodavaram revenue division
  1. Addateegala
  2. Devipatnam
  3. Gangavaram
  4. Gurthedu
  5. Maredumilli
  6. Rajavommangi
  7. Rampachodavaram
  8. Y. Ramavaram

== Demographics ==
Religions in Polavaram district (2011)
Religion	Percent
Hinduism	97.28%
Christianity	1.64%
Islam	0.84%
Other or not stated	0.24%
Distribution of religions

Polavaram district has a population of 349,913. The district has a sex ratio of 1051 females per 1000 males. The only town in the district is Rampachodavaram, which has a population of 9,952. Scheduled Castes and Scheduled Tribes made up 19,634 (5.61%) and 240,729 (68.80%) of the population respectively.

Languages of Polavaram district (2011)
1. Telugu (76.69%)
2. Koya (20.70%)
3. Odia (1.13%)
4. Others (1.48%)

At the time of the 2011 census, 76.69% of the population spoke Telugu, 20.70% Koya and 1.13% Odia as their first language.

== Politics ==
There is one parliamentary and one assembly constituencies in Polavaram district. The parliamentary constituency is

- Araku (ST) (Lok Sabha constituency)

The assembly constituency is

Constituency number	Name	Reserved for (SC/ST/None)	Parliament
53	Rampachodavaram	ST	Araku (ST) (Lok Sabha constituency)
