= List of Indian National Developmental Inclusive Alliance candidates for the 2024 Indian general election =

INDIA candidates in 2024 Indian lower house election

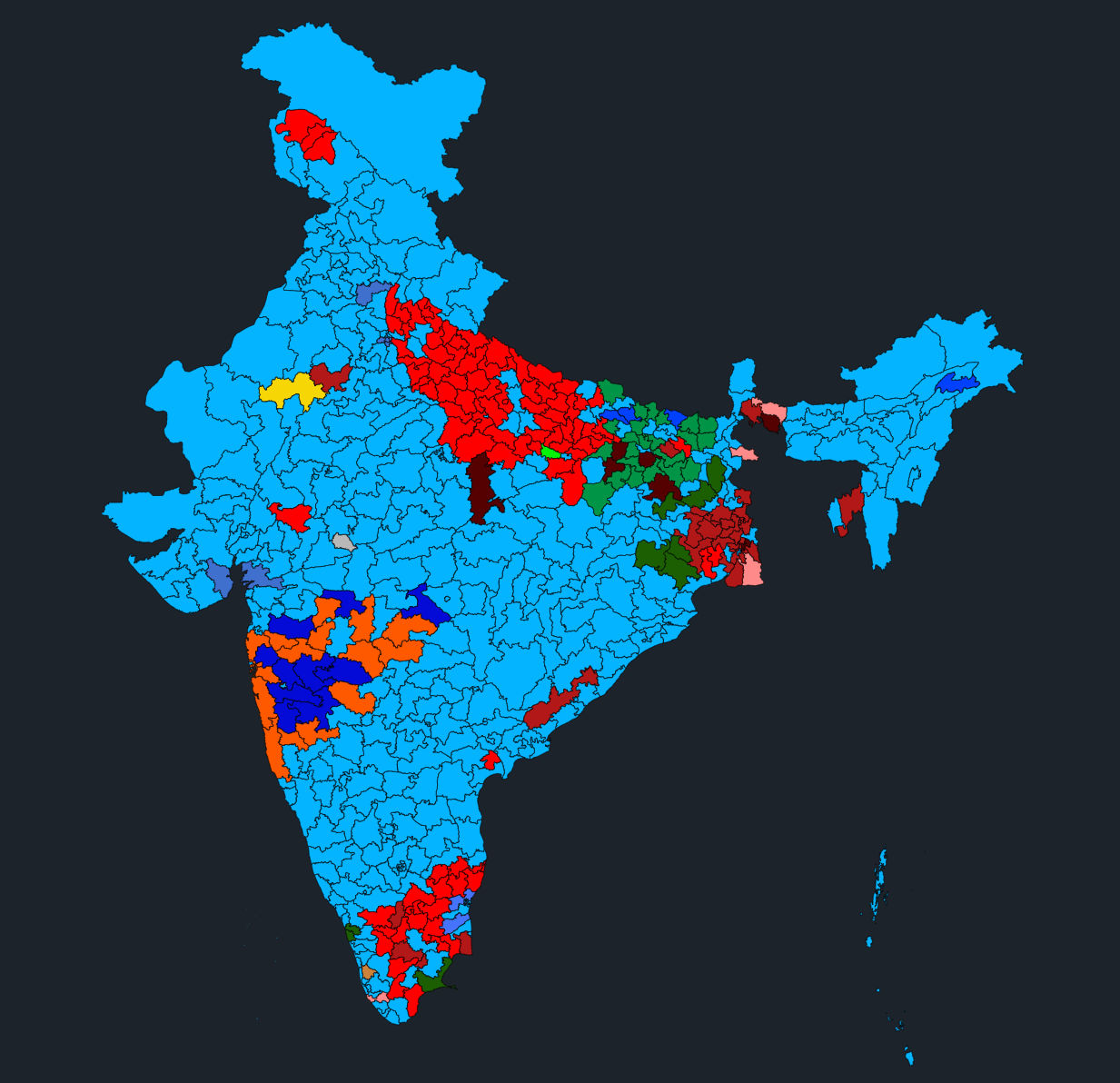
The seat sharing map of the INDIA allaince parties

The following is the list of candidates of Indian National Developmental Inclusive Alliance for the 2024 Indian general election. The following is the seat-sharing summary for Indian National Developmental Inclusive Alliance's candidates in 2024 Indian general election.

== Seat sharing summary ==
INDIA parties seat-sharing

Seat-sharing under INDIA bloc
Party	States/UTs	Seats contested		Seats won	
Indian National Congress	Karnataka	28	326	9	99
Indian National Congress	Madhya Pradesh	27	326	0	99
Indian National Congress	Andhra Pradesh	23	326	0	99
Indian National Congress	Gujarat	23	326	1	99
Indian National Congress	Rajasthan	22	326	8	99
Indian National Congress	Odisha	20	326	1	99
Indian National Congress	Maharashtra	17	326	13	99
Indian National Congress	Telangana	17	326	8	99
Indian National Congress	Uttar Pradesh	17	326	6	99
Indian National Congress	Kerala	16	326	14	99
Indian National Congress	Assam	13	326	3	99
Indian National Congress	Punjab	13	326	7	99
Indian National Congress	West Bengal	12	326	1	99
Indian National Congress	Chhattisgarh	11	326	1	99
Indian National Congress	Bihar	9	326	3	99
Indian National Congress	Haryana	9	326	5	99
Indian National Congress	Tamil Nadu	9	326	9	99
Indian National Congress	Jharkhand	7	326	2	99
Indian National Congress	Uttarakhand	5	326	0	99
Indian National Congress	Himachal Pradesh	4	326	0	99
Indian National Congress	Delhi	3	326	0	99
Indian National Congress	Arunachal Pradesh	2	326	0	99
Indian National Congress	Dadra Nagar Haveli and Daman Diu	2	326	0	99
Indian National Congress	Goa	2	326	1	99
Indian National Congress	Jammu and Kashmir	2	326	0	99
Indian National Congress	Manipur	2	326	2	99
Indian National Congress	Meghalaya	2	326	1	99
Indian National Congress	Andaman and Nicobar Islands	1	326	0	99
Indian National Congress	Chandigarh	1	326	1	99
Indian National Congress	Ladakh	1	326	0	99
Indian National Congress	Lakshadweep	1	326	1	99
Indian National Congress	Mizoram	1	326	0	99
Indian National Congress	Nagaland	1	326	1	99
Indian National Congress	Puducherry	1	326	1	99
Indian National Congress	Sikkim	1	326	0	99
Indian National Congress	Tripura	1	326	0	99
Samajwadi Party	Uttar Pradesh	62		37	
Communist Party of India (Marxist)	West Bengal	23	29	0	3
Communist Party of India (Marxist)	Tamil Nadu	2	29	2	3
Communist Party of India (Marxist)	Andhra Pradesh	1	29	0	3
Communist Party of India (Marxist)	Bihar	1	29	0	3
Communist Party of India (Marxist)	Rajasthan	1	29	1	3
Communist Party of India (Marxist)	Tripura	1	29	0	3
Rashtriya Janata Dal	Bihar	23	24	4	4
Rashtriya Janata Dal	Jharkhand	1	24	0	4
Dravida Munnetra Kazhagam	Tamil Nadu	21	22	21	22
Kongunadu Makkal Desia Katchi	Tamil Nadu	1	22	1	22
Shiv Sena (Uddhav Balasaheb Thackeray)	Maharashtra	21		9	
Nationalist Congress Party (Sharadchandra Pawar)	Maharashtra	10		8	
Aam Aadmi Party	Delhi	4	7	0	
Aam Aadmi Party	Gujarat	2	7	0	
Aam Aadmi Party	Haryana	1	7	0	
Communist Party of India	Tamil Nadu	2	6	2	2
Communist Party of India	West Bengal	2	6	0	2
Communist Party of India	Andhra Pradesh	1	6	0	2
Communist Party of India	Bihar	1	6	0	2
Jharkhand Mukti Morcha	Jharkhand	5	6	3	3
Jharkhand Mukti Morcha	Odisha	1	6	0	3
Communist Party of India (Marxist–Leninist) Liberation	Bihar	3	4	2	2
Communist Party of India (Marxist–Leninist) Liberation	Jharkhand	1	4	0	2
Revolutionary Socialist Party	West Bengal	3	4	0	1
Revolutionary Socialist Party	Kerala	1	4	1	1
All India Forward Bloc	West Bengal	2	3	0	
All India Forward Bloc	Madhya Pradesh	1	3	0	
Indian Union Muslim League	Kerala	2	3	2	3
Indian Union Muslim League	Tamil Nadu	1	3	1	3
Jammu & Kashmir National Conference	Jammu and Kashmir	3		2	
Vikassheel Insaan Party	Bihar	3		0	
Viduthalai Chiruthaigal Katchi	Tamil Nadu	2		2	
All India Trinamool Congress	Uttar Pradesh	1		0	
Assam Jatiya Parishad	Assam	1		0	
Bharat Adivasi Party	Rajasthan	1		1	
Kerala Congress	Kerala	1		1	
Marumalarchi Dravida Munnetra Kazhagam	Tamil Nadu	1		1	
Rashtriya Loktantrik Party	Rajasthan	1		1	
Total		541		201	

INDIA parties under regional coalition/outside the alliance

Seats contested by INDIA parties outside the alliance
Parties	States/UTs	Seats contested		Seats Won	
All India Trinamool Congress	West Bengal	42	47	29	29
All India Trinamool Congress	Assam	4	47	0	29
All India Trinamool Congress	Meghalaya	1	47	0	29
All India Forward Bloc	Maharashtra	8	29	0	
All India Forward Bloc	Andhra Pradesh	5	29	0	
All India Forward Bloc	Uttar Pradesh	5	29	0	
All India Forward Bloc	Telangana	3	29	0	
All India Forward Bloc	Bihar	2	29	0	
All India Forward Bloc	Delhi	2	29	0	
All India Forward Bloc	Jammu and Kashmir	2	29	0	
All India Forward Bloc	Odisha	1	29	0	
All India Forward Bloc	West Bengal	1	29	0	
Communist Party of India	Uttar Pradesh	6	24	0	
Communist Party of India	Jharkhand	4	24	0	
Communist Party of India	Kerala	4	24	0	
Communist Party of India	Madhya Pradesh	3	24	0	
Communist Party of India	Punjab	3	24	0	
Communist Party of India	Assam	1	24	0	
Communist Party of India	Chhattisgarh	1	24	0	
Communist Party of India	Maharashtra	1	24	0	
Communist Party of India	Odisha	1	24	0	
Communist Party of India (Marxist)	Kerala	15	23	1	1
Communist Party of India (Marxist)	Andaman and Nicobar Islands	1	23	0	1
Communist Party of India (Marxist)	Assam	1	23	0	1
Communist Party of India (Marxist)	Jharkhand	1	23	0	1
Communist Party of India (Marxist)	Karnataka	1	23	0	1
Communist Party of India (Marxist)	Maharashtra	1	23	0	1
Communist Party of India (Marxist)	Odisha	1	23	0	1
Communist Party of India (Marxist)	Punjab	1	23	0	1
Communist Party of India (Marxist)	Telangana	1	23	0	1
Bharat Adivasi Party	Madhya Pradesh	5	21	0	
Bharat Adivasi Party	Rajasthan	5	21	0	
Bharat Adivasi Party	Maharashtra	4	21	0	
Bharat Adivasi Party	Gujarat	2	21	0	
Bharat Adivasi Party	Jharkhand	2	21	0	
Bharat Adivasi Party	Andhra Pradesh	1	21	0	
Bharat Adivasi Party	Chhattisgarh	1	21	0	
Bharat Adivasi Party	Dadra Nagar Haveli and Daman Diu	1	21	0	
Aam Aadmi Party	Punjab	13	15	3	3
Aam Aadmi Party	Assam	2	15	0	3
Viduthalai Chiruthaigal Katchi	Telangana	7	11	0	
Viduthalai Chiruthaigal Katchi	Karnataka	2	11	0	
Viduthalai Chiruthaigal Katchi	Andhra Pradesh	1	11	0	
Viduthalai Chiruthaigal Katchi	Kerala	1	11	0	
Samajwadi Party	Andhra Pradesh	7	9	0	
Samajwadi Party	Gujarat	1	9	0	
Samajwadi Party	Odisha	1	9	0	
Revolutionary Socialist Party	Andhra Pradesh	3	6	0	
Revolutionary Socialist Party	Punjab	2	6	0	
Revolutionary Socialist Party	Telangana	1	6	0	
Communist Party of India (Marxist–Leninist) Liberation	Andhra Pradesh	1	3	0	
Communist Party of India (Marxist–Leninist) Liberation	Odisha	1	3	0	
Communist Party of India (Marxist–Leninist) Liberation	West Bengal	1	3	0	
Jammu and Kashmir Peoples Democratic Party	Jammu and Kashmir	3		0	
Indian National Congress	West Bengal	1	2	0	
Indian National Congress	Rajasthan	1	2	0	
Nationalist Congress Party (Sharadchandra Pawar)	Haryana	1	2	0	
Nationalist Congress Party (Sharadchandra Pawar)	Lakshadweep	1	2	0	
Kerala Congress (M)	Kerala	1		0	
Total		196		33	

== Andaman and Nicobar Islands ==
INC (1)
CPI(M) (1)

Constituency	Poll on	Candidate			Result		
Constituency	Poll on	1	Andaman and Nicobar Islands	19 April 2024	Kuldeep Rai Sharma	INC	Lost
D. Ayappan	CPI(M)	1	Andaman and Nicobar Islands	19 April 2024	Lost		

Friendly Contest

== Andhra Pradesh ==
- INDIA Seat-sharing

INC (23)
CPI (1)
CPI(M) (1)

- Other Parties of INDIA

SP (7)
AIFB (5)
RSP (3)
BAP (1)
CPI(ML)L (1)
VCK (1)

Constituency		Poll on	Candidate			Result		
Constituency		Poll on	1	Araku (ST)	13 May 2024	Pachipenta Appalanarsa	CPI(M)	Lost
Mottadam Raja Babu		BAP	1	Araku (ST)	13 May 2024	Lost		
2	Srikakulam	Pedada Parameswara Rao		INC	13 May 2024	Lost		
3	Vizianagaram	Bobbili Srinu		INC	13 May 2024	Lost		
3	Vizianagaram	Atchiyya Naidu Samireddy		SP	13 May 2024	Lost		
4	Visakhapatnam	Pulusu Satyanarayana Reddy		INC	13 May 2024	Lost		
4	Visakhapatnam	Jaladi Vijaya Kumari		SP	13 May 2024	Lost		
5	Anakapalli	Vegi Venkatesh		INC	13 May 2024	Lost		
6	Kakinada	M. M. Pallam Raju		INC	13 May 2024	Lost		
6	Kakinada	Bugatha Bangarrao		CPI(ML)L	13 May 2024	Lost		
7	Amalapuram (SC)	Janga Goutham		INC	13 May 2024	Lost		
8	Rajahmundry	Gidugu Rudra Raju		INC	13 May 2024	Lost		
9	Narasapuram	Korlapati Brahmanand Rao Naidu (K.B.R. Naidu)		INC	13 May 2024	Lost		
10	Eluru	Lavanya Kumari		INC	13 May 2024	Lost		
11	Machilipatnam	Gollu Krishna		INC	13 May 2024	Lost		
11	Machilipatnam	Kommaraju Siva Narasimha Rao		AIFB	13 May 2024	Lost		
12	Vijayawada	Valluru Bhargav		INC	13 May 2024	Lost		
13	Guntur	Jangala Ajay Kumar		CPI	13 May 2024	Lost		
13	Guntur	Challapalli Ratan Raju		VCK	13 May 2024	Lost		
14	Narasaraopet	Garnepudi Alexander Sudhakar		INC	13 May 2024	Lost		
14	Narasaraopet	Thokala Naga Raju		AIFB	13 May 2024	Lost		
14	Narasaraopet	Garlapati Subhash Prem		RSP	13 May 2024	Lost		
15	Bapatla (SC)	J D Seelam		INC	13 May 2024	Lost		
16	Ongole	Eda Sudhakara Reddy		INC	13 May 2024	Lost		
16	Ongole	Pasam Venkateswerlu Yadav		SP	13 May 2024	Lost		
17	Nandyal	Jangiti Lakshmi Narasimha Yadav		INC	13 May 2024	Lost		
17	Nandyal	Yelampalle Govardhan Reddy		AIFB	13 May 2024	Lost		
17	Nandyal	Pandu Ranga Yadav Siddapu		SP	13 May 2024	Lost		
18	Kurnool	P G Ram Pullaiah Yadav		INC	13 May 2024	Lost		
19	Anantapur	Mallikarjun Vajjala		INC	13 May 2024	Lost		
19	Anantapur	Shaik Nizam		SP	13 May 2024	Lost		
20	Hindupur	B A Samad Shaheen		INC	13 May 2024	Lost		
20	Hindupur	Anjinappa Gari Sreenivasulu		RSP	13 May 2024	Lost		
21	Kadapa	Y. S. Sharmila		INC	13 May 2024	Lost		
21	Kadapa	Ankireddy Suresh Kumar Reddy		AIFB	13 May 2024	Lost		
22	Nellore	Koppula Raju		INC	13 May 2024	Lost		
22	Nellore	Shaik Shafi Ahmed		AIFB	13 May 2024	Lost		
22	Nellore	Viveka Mannepalli		RSP	13 May 2024	Lost		
23	Tirupati (SC)	Chinta Mohan		INC	13 May 2024	Lost		
23	Tirupati (SC)	Veluru Thejovathi		SP	13 May 2024	Lost		
24	Rajampet	S K Basheed		INC	13 May 2024	Lost		
25	Chittoor (SC)	M. Jagapathi		INC	13 May 2024	Lost		
25	Chittoor (SC)	Pallipattu Abhinav Vishnu		SP	13 May 2024	Lost		

Friendly Contest
Friendly Contest

== Arunachal Pradesh ==
INC (2)

Constituency		Poll On	Candidate		Result
1	Arunachal West	19 April 2024	Nabam Tuki	INC	Lost
2	Arunachal East	19 April 2024	Bosiram Siram	INC	Lost

== Assam ==
- INDIA Seat-sharing

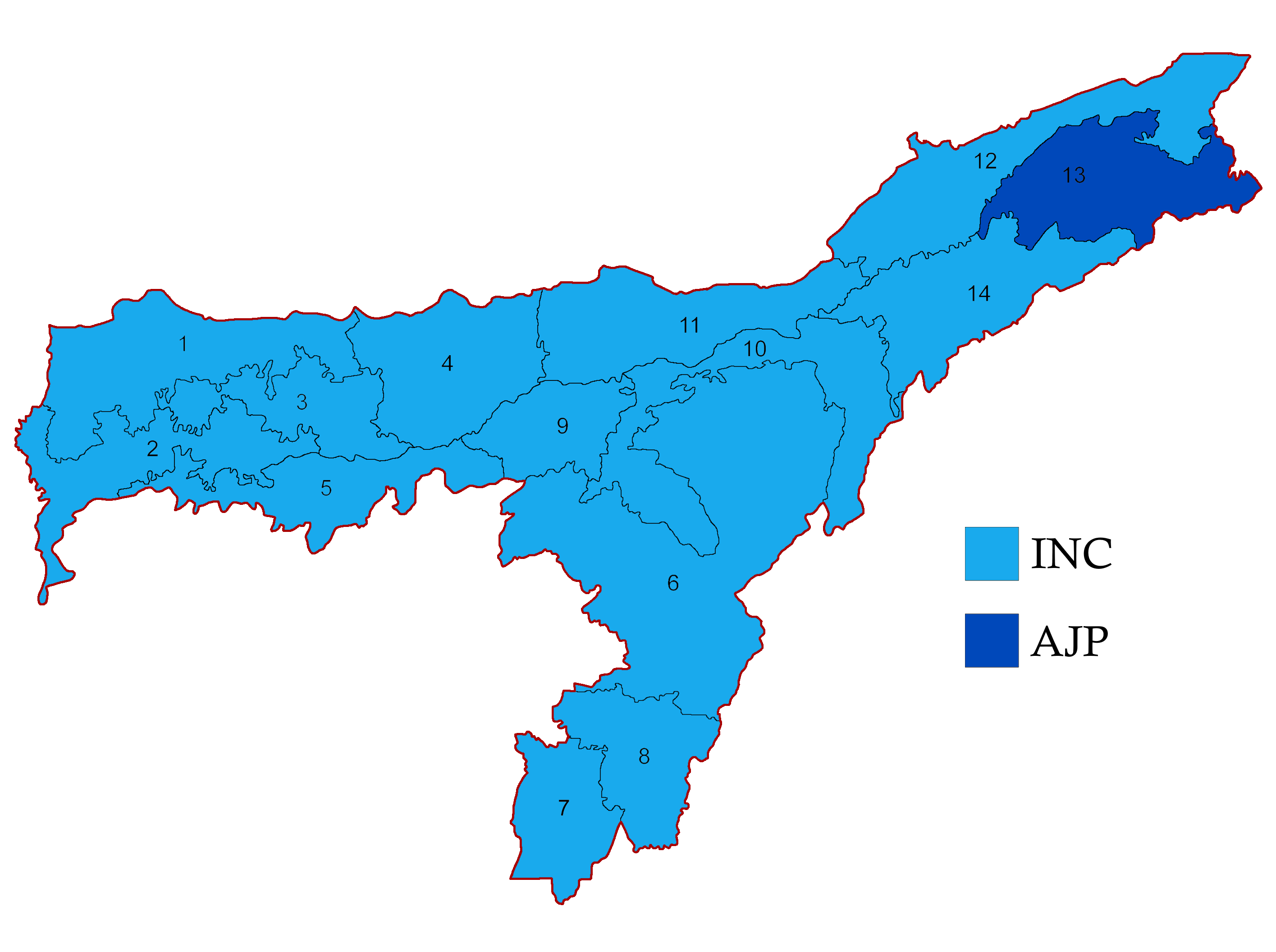

INC (13)
AJP (1)

- Others Parties of INDIA

AITC (4)
AAP (2)
CPI (1)
CPI(M) (1)

Constituency		Poll On	Candidate		Result
1	Kokrajhar (ST)	7 May 2024	Garjan Mushahary	INC	Lost
1	Kokrajhar (ST)	7 May 2024	Gauri Shankar Sarania	AITC	Lost
2	Dhubri	7 May 2024	Rakibul Hussain	INC	Won
3	Barpeta	7 May 2024	Deep Bayan	INC	Lost
3	Barpeta	7 May 2024	Abul Kalam Azad	AITC	Lost
3	Barpeta	7 May 2024	Manoranjan Talukdar	CPI(M)	Lost
4	Darrang–Udalguri	26 April 2024	Madhab Rajbangshi	INC	Lost
5	Guwahati	7 May 2024	Mira Barthakur Goswami	INC	Lost
6	Diphu (ST)	26 April 2024	Joyram Engleng	INC	Lost
7	Karimganj	26 April 2024	Rashid Ahmed Choudhary	INC	Lost
8	Silchar (SC)	26 April 2024	Surjya Kanta Sarkar	INC	Lost
8	Silchar (SC)	26 April 2024	Radheshyam Biswas	AITC	Lost
9	Nagaon	26 April 2024	Pradyut Bordoloi	INC	Won
10	Kaziranga	19 April 2024	Roselina Tirkey	INC	Lost
11	Sonitpur	19 April 2024	Prem Lal Ganju	INC	Lost
11	Sonitpur	19 April 2024	Rishiraj Sharma	AAP	Lost
12	Lakhimpur	19 April 2024	Uday Shankar Hazarika	INC	Lost
12	Lakhimpur	19 April 2024	Ghana Kanta Chutia	AITC	Lost
12	Lakhimpur	19 April 2024	Dhiren Kachari	CPI	Lost
13	Dibrugarh	19 April 2024	Lurinjyoti Gogoi	AJP	Lost
13	Dibrugarh	19 April 2024	Manoj Dhanuar	AAP	Lost
14	Jorhat	19 April 2024	Gaurav Gogoi	INC	Won

Friendly Contest
Friendly Contest
Friendly Contest

== Bihar ==
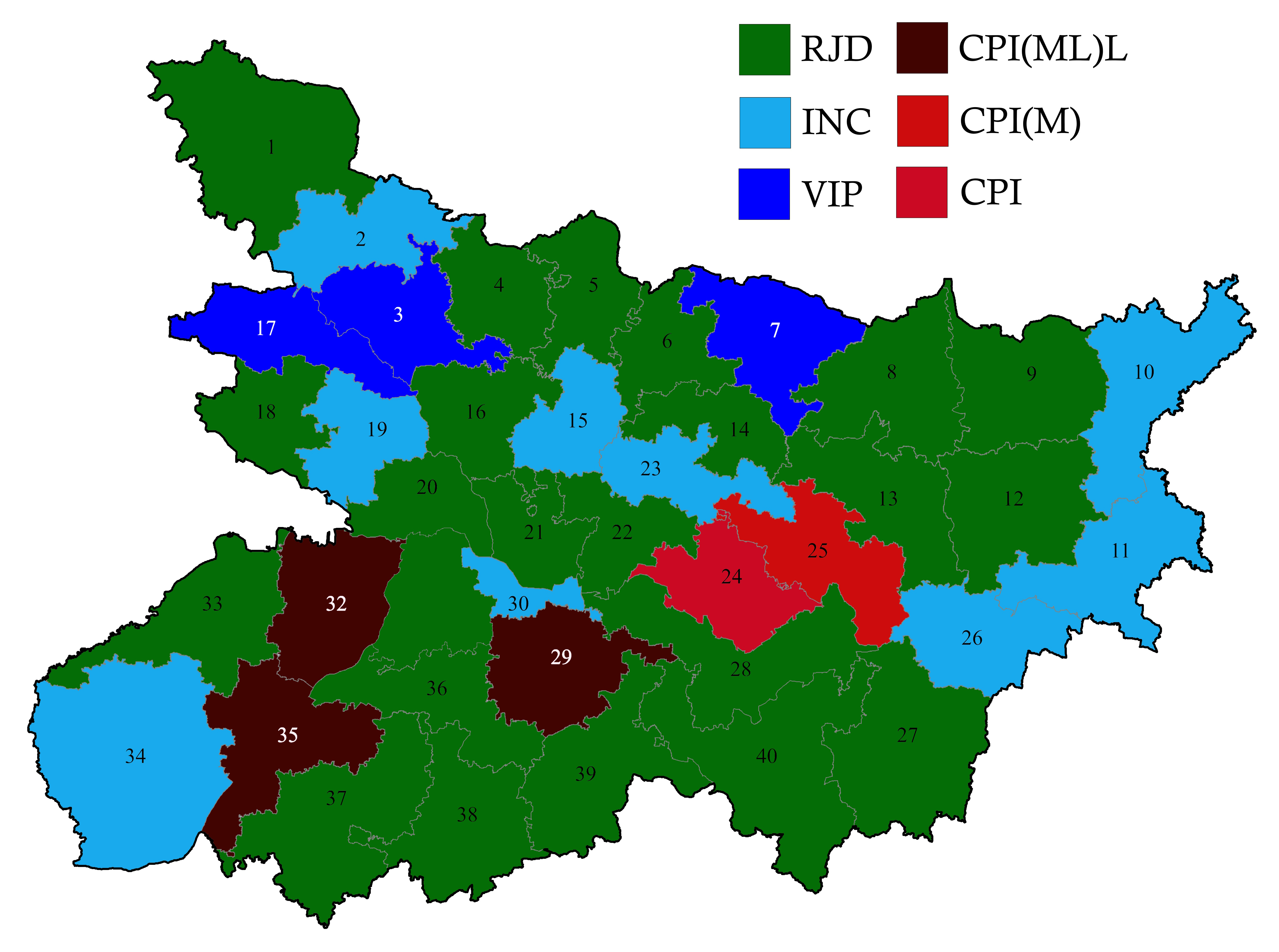

- INDIA Seat-sharing

RJD (23)
INC (9)
VIP (3)
CPI(ML)L (3)
CPI(M) (1)
CPI (1)

- Others Parties of INDIA

AIFB (2)

Constituency		Poll On	Candidate		Result
1	Valmiki Nagar	25 May 2024	Deepak Yadav	RJD	Lost
2	Paschim Champaran	25 May 2024	Madan Mohan Tiwari	INC	Lost
3	Purvi Champaran	25 May 2024	Rajesh Kushwaha	VIP	Lost
4	Sheohar	25 May 2024	Ritu Jaiswal	RJD	Lost
5	Sitamarhi	20 May 2024	Arjun Rai	RJD	Lost
6	Madhubani	20 May 2024	Ali Ashraf Fatmi	RJD	Lost
7	Jhanjharpur	7 May 2024	Suman Kumar Mahaseth	VIP	Lost
8	Supaul	7 May 2024	Chandrahas Chaupal	RJD	Lost
9	Araria	7 May 2024	Mohammed Shahnawaz Alam	RJD	Lost
10	Kishanganj	26 April 2024	Mohammad Jawed	INC	Won
11	Katihar	26 April 2024	Tariq Anwar	INC	Won
12	Purnia	26 April 2024	Beema Bharti	RJD	Lost
12	Purnia	26 April 2024	Kishore Kumar Yadav	AIFB	Lost
13	Madhepura	7 May 2024	Kumar Chandradeep	RJD	Lost
14	Darbhanga	13 May 2024	Lalit Kumar Yadav	RJD	Lost
15	Muzaffarpur	20 May 2024	Ajay Nishad	INC	Lost
16	Vaishali	25 May 2024	Vijay Kumar Shukla	RJD	Lost
17	Gopalganj (SC)	25 May 2024	Premnath Chanchal Paswan	VIP	Lost
18	Siwan	25 May 2024	Awadh Bihari Choudhary	RJD	Lost
19	Maharajganj	25 May 2024	Akash Prasad Singh	INC	Lost
20	Saran	20 May 2024	Rohini Acharya	RJD	Lost
21	Hajipur (SC)	20 May 2024	Shiv Chandra Ram	RJD	Lost
22	Ujiarpur	13 May 2024	Alok Kumar Mehta	RJD	Lost
23	Samastipur (SC)	13 May 2024	Sunny Hazari	INC	Lost
24	Begusarai	13 May 2024	Awadhesh Kumar Rai	CPI	Lost
25	Khagaria	7 May 2024	Sanjay Kumar Kushwaha	CPI(M)	Lost
26	Bhagalpur	26 April 2024	Ajeet Sharma	INC	Lost
27	Banka	26 April 2024	Jay Prakash Narayan Yadav	RJD	Lost
28	Munger	13 May 2024	Anita Devi Mahto	RJD	Lost
29	Nalanda	1 June 2024	Sandeep Saurav	CPI(ML)L	Lost
30	Patna Sahib	1 June 2024	Anshul Avijit	INC	Lost
31	Pataliputra	1 June 2024	Misa Bharti	RJD	Won
31	Pataliputra	1 June 2024	Madhuri Kumari	AIFB	Lost
32	Arrah	1 June 2024	Sudama Prasad	CPI(ML)L	Won
33	Buxar	1 June 2024	Sudhakar Singh	RJD	Won
34	Sasaram (SC)	1 June 2024	Manoj Kumar	INC	Won
35	Karakat	1 June 2024	Raja Ram Singh Kushwaha	CPI(ML)L	Won
36	Jahanabad	1 June 2024	Surendra Prasad Yadav	RJD	Won
37	Aurangabad	19 April 2024	Abhay Kushwaha	RJD	Won
38	Gaya (SC)	19 April 2024	Kumar Sarvjeet	RJD	Lost
39	Nawada	19 April 2024	Shravan Kushwaha	RJD	Lost
40	Jamui (SC)	19 April 2024	Archana Ravidas	RJD	Lost

Friendly Contest

== Chandigarh ==
INC (1)

Constituency		Poll On	Candidate		Result
1	Chandigarh	1 June 2024	Manish Tewari	INC	Won

== Chhattisgarh ==
INC (11)
BAP (1)
CPI (1)

Constituency		Poll On	Candidate		Result
1	Sarguja (ST)	7 May 2024	Shashi Singh	INC	Lost
1	Sarguja (ST)	7 May 2024	Joreem Minj	BAP	Lost
2	Raigarh (ST)	7 May 2024	Menka Devi Singh	INC	Lost
3	Janjgir (SC)	7 May 2024	Shivkumar Dahariya	INC	Lost
4	Korba	7 May 2024	Jyotsna Mahant	INC	Won
5	Bilaspur	7 May 2024	Devender Singh Yadav	INC	Lost
6	Rajnandgaon	26 April 2024	Bhupesh Baghel	INC	Lost
7	Durg	7 May 2024	Rajendra Sahu	INC	Lost
8	Raipur	7 May 2024	Vikas Upadhayay	INC	Lost
9	Mahasamund	26 April 2024	Tamradhwaj Sahu	INC	Lost
10	Bastar (ST)	19 April 2024	Kawasi Lakhma	INC	Lost
10	Bastar (ST)	19 April 2024	Phool Singh Kachlam	CPI	Lost
11	Kanker (ST)	26 April 2024	Biresh Thakur	INC	Lost

Friendly Contest

== Dadra and Nagar Haveli and Daman and Diu ==
INC (2)
BAP (1)

Constituency		Poll On	Candidate		Result
1	Dadra and Nagar Haveli	7 May 2024	Ajit Ramjibhai Mahla	INC	Lost
1	Dadra and Nagar Haveli	7 May 2024	Deepak Bhai Kurada	BAP	Lost
2	Daman and Diu	7 May 2024	Ketan Dahyabhai Patel	INC	Lost

Friendly Contest

== Delhi ==
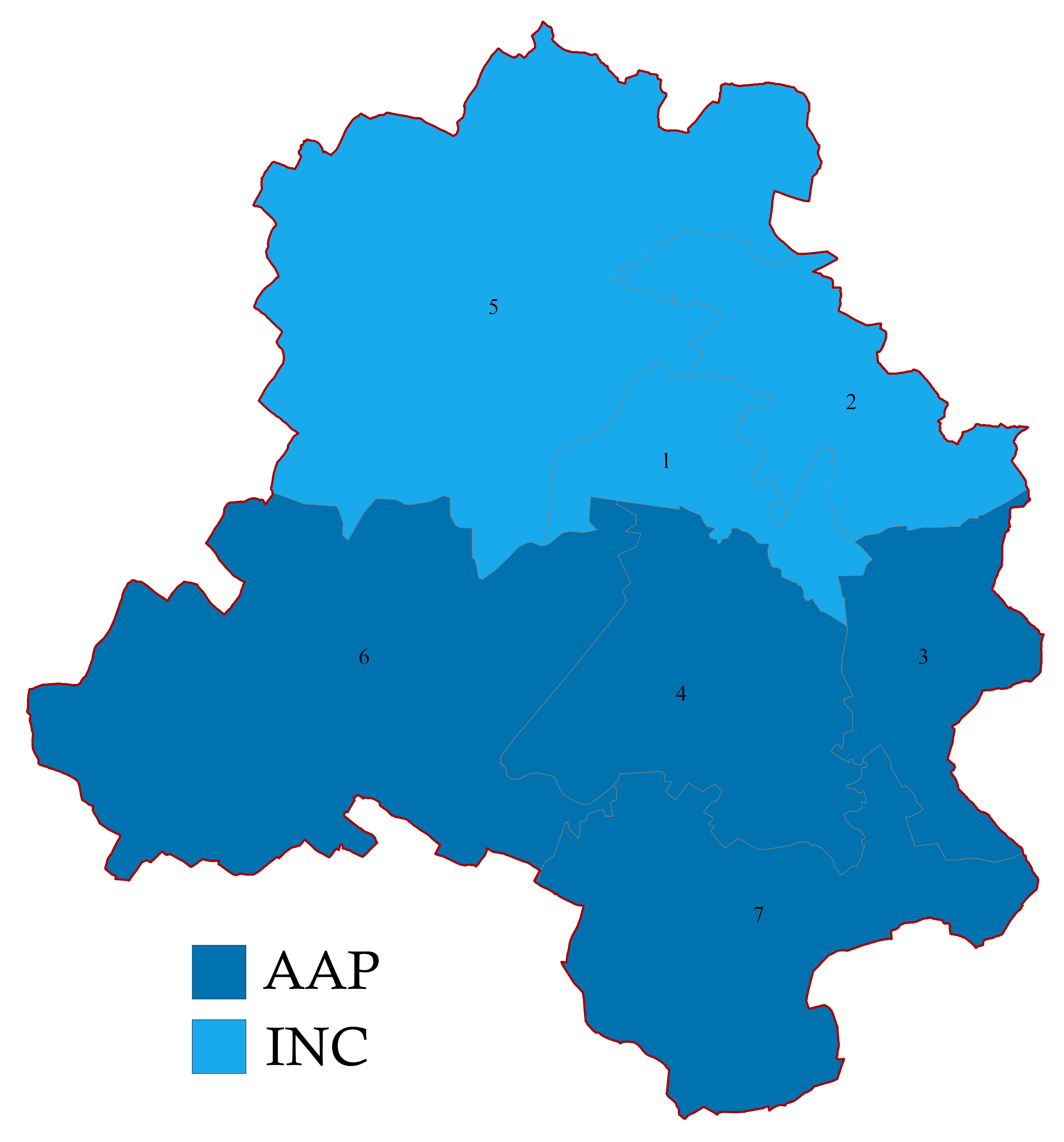

- INDIA Seat-sharing

AAP (4)
INC (3)

- Others Parties of INDIA

AIFB (2)

Constituency		Poll On	Candidate		Result
1	Chandni Chowk	25 May 2024	Jai Prakash Agarwal	INC	Lost
2	North East Delhi	25 May 2024	Kanhaiya Kumar	INC	Lost
3	East Delhi	25 May 2024	Kuldeep Kumar	AAP	Lost
4	New Delhi	25 May 2024	Somnath Bharti	AAP	Lost
5	North West Delhi (SC)	25 May 2024	Udit Raj	INC	Lost
6	West Delhi	25 May 2024	Mahabal Mishra	AAP	Lost
6	West Delhi	25 May 2024	Charanjeet Singh	AIFB	Lost
7	South Delhi	25 May 2024	Sahiram Pehalwan	AAP	Lost
7	South Delhi	25 May 2024	Gautam Anand	AIFB	Lost

Friendly Contest

== Goa ==
INC (2)

Constituency		Poll On	Candidate		Result
1	North Goa	7 May 2024	Ramakant Khalap	INC	Lost
2	South Goa	7 May 2024	Capt. Viriato Fernandes	INC	Won

== Gujarat ==
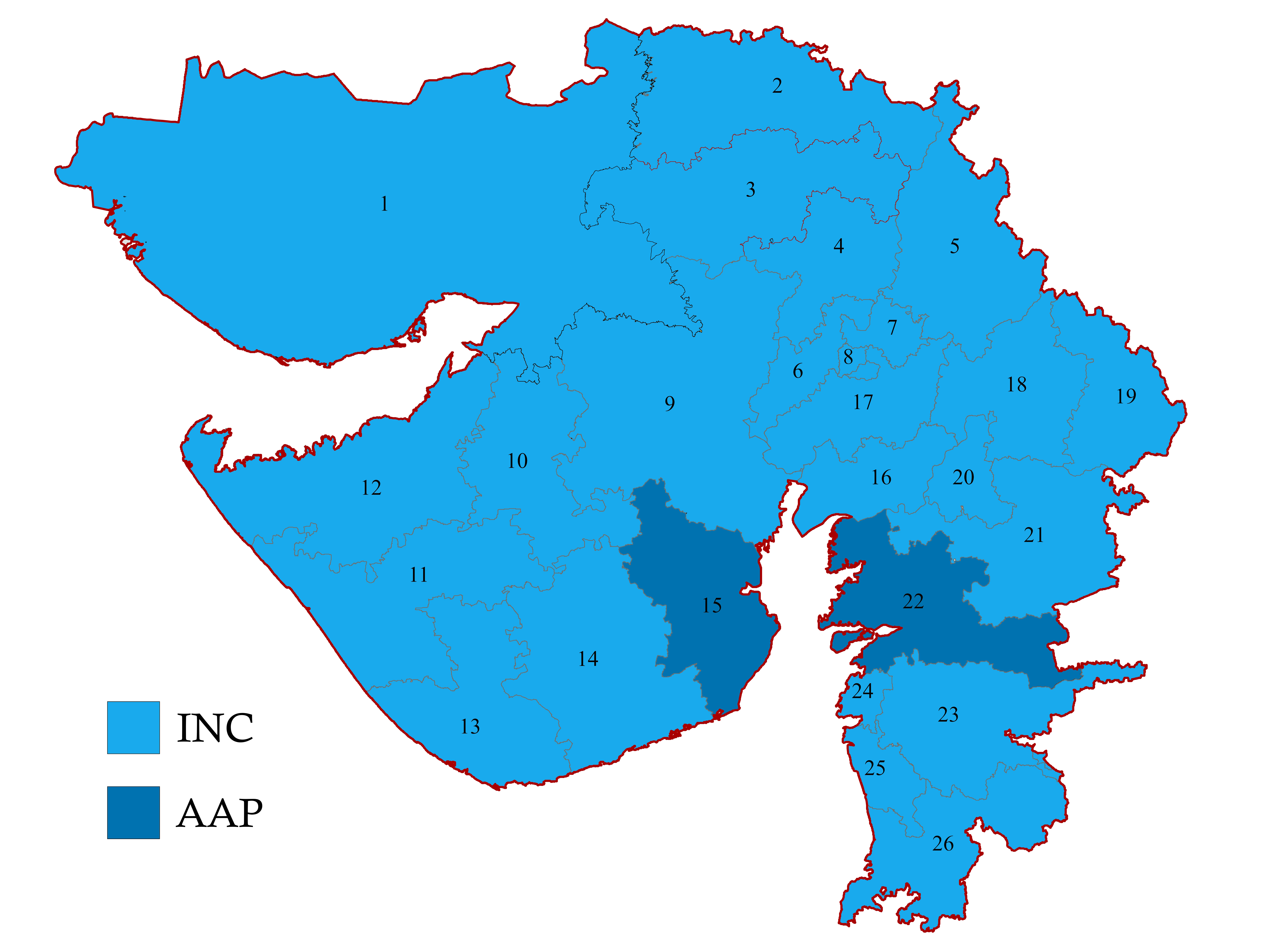

- INDIA Seat-sharing

INC (23)
AAP (2)

- Others Parties of INDIA

BAP (2)
SP (1)

Constituency		Poll On	Candidate		Result
1	Kachchh (SC)	7 May 2024	Nitishbhai Lalan	INC	Lost
2	Banaskantha	7 May 2024	Geni Thakor	INC	Won
2	Banaskantha	7 May 2024	Jasubhai Gamar	BAP	Lost
3	Patan	7 May 2024	Chandanji Thakor	INC	Lost
4	Mahesana	7 May 2024	Ramji Thakor (Palvi)	INC	Lost
5	Sabarkantha	7 May 2024	Tushar Chaudhary	INC	Lost
6	Gandhinagar	7 May 2024	Sonal Patel	INC	Lost
7	Ahmedabad East	7 May 2024	Himmatsinh Patel	INC	Lost
8	Ahmedabad West (SC)	7 May 2024	Bharat Makwana	INC	Lost
9	Surendranagar	7 May 2024	Rutvik Makwana	INC	Lost
10	Rajkot	7 May 2024	Paresh Dhanani	INC	Lost
11	Porbandar	7 May 2024	Lalit Vasoya	INC	Lost
11	Porbandar	7 May 2024	Shekhava Nileshkumar	SP	Lost
12	Jamnagar	7 May 2024	J. P. Marvia	INC	Lost
13	Junagadh	7 May 2024	Hirabhai Jotva	INC	Lost
14	Amreli	7 May 2024	Jennyben Thummar	INC	Lost
15	Bhavnagar	7 May 2024	Umesh Makwana	AAP	Lost
16	Anand	7 May 2024	Amit Chavda	INC	Lost
17	Kheda	7 May 2024	Kalusinh Dabhi	INC	Lost
18	Panchmahal	7 May 2024	Gulabsinh Chauhan	INC	Lost
19	Dahod (ST)	7 May 2024	Prabha Kishor Taviad	INC	Lost
20	Vadodara	7 May 2024	Jashpalsinh Padhiyar	INC	Lost
21	Chhota Udaipur (ST)	7 May 2024	Sukhram Rathva	INC	Lost
22	Bharuch	7 May 2024	Chaitar Vasava	AAP	Lost
22	Bharuch	7 May 2024	Chhotu Vasava	BAP	Lost
23	Bardoli (ST)	7 May 2024	Siddarth Chaudhary	INC	Lost
24	Surat	7 May 2024	DNC		
25	Navsari	7 May 2024	Naishadh Desai	INC	Lost
26	Valsad (ST)	7 May 2024	Anant Patel	INC	Lost

Friendly Contest

== Haryana ==
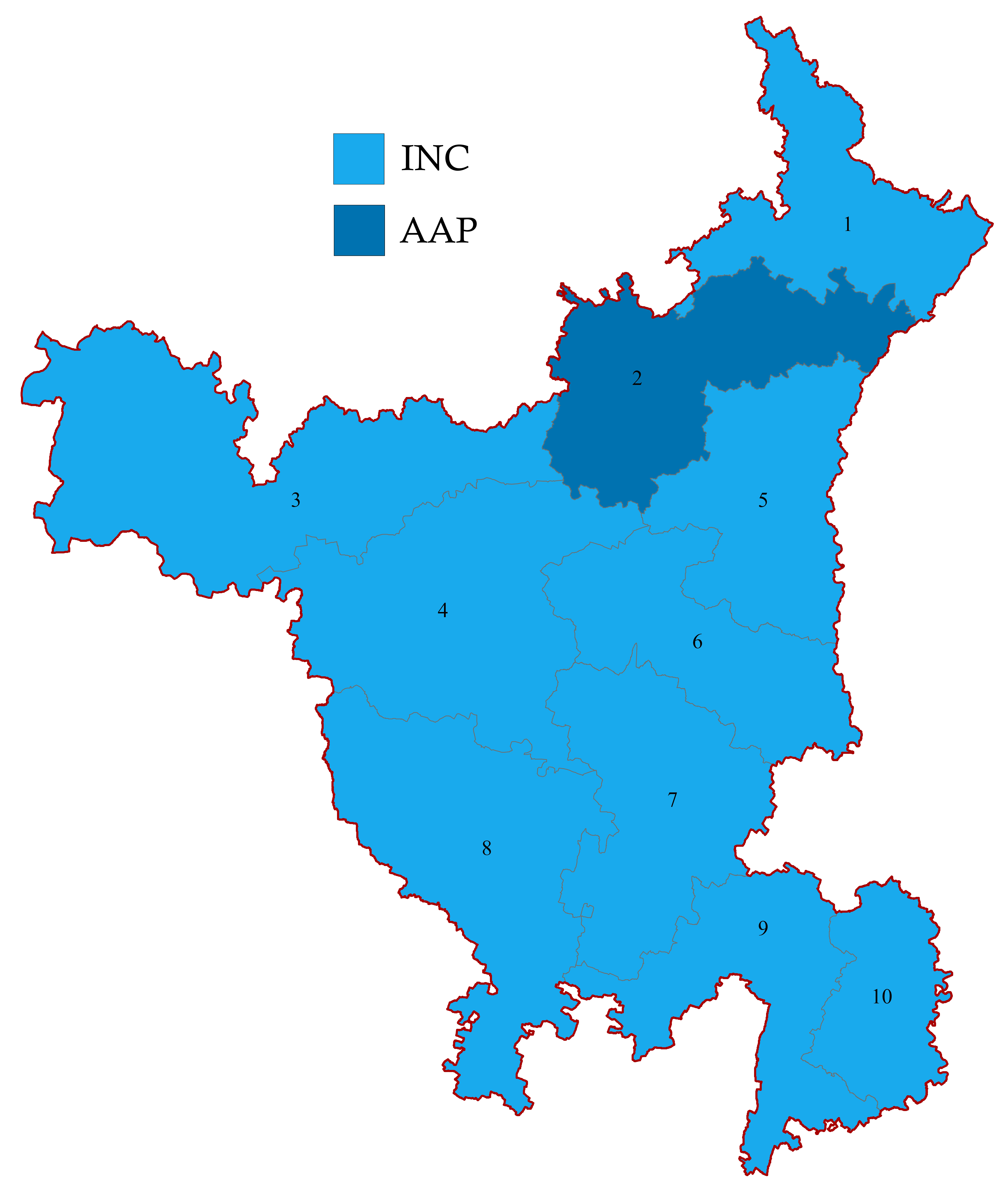

- INDIA Seat-sharing

INC (9)
AAP (1)

- Others Parties of INDIA

NCP-SP (1)

Constituency		Poll On	Candidate		Result
1	Ambala (SC)	25 May 2024	Varun Chaudhary	INC	Won
2	Kurukshetra	25 May 2024	Sushil Gupta	AAP	Lost
3	Sirsa (SC)	25 May 2024	Selja Kumari	INC	Won
4	Hisar	25 May 2024	Jai Parkash	INC	Won
5	Karnal	25 May 2024	Divyanshu Budhiraja	INC	Lost
5	Karnal	25 May 2024	Maratha Virender Verma	NCP-SP	Lost
6	Sonipat	25 May 2024	Satpal Brahamchari	INC	Won
7	Rohtak	25 May 2024	Deepender Singh Hooda	INC	Won
8	Bhiwani–Mahendragarh	25 May 2024	Rao Dan Singh	INC	Lost
9	Gurgaon	25 May 2024	Raj Babbar	INC	Lost
10	Faridabad	25 May 2024	Mahender Pratap Singh	INC	Lost

Friendly Contest

== Himachal Pradesh ==
INC (4)

Constituency		Poll On	Candidate		Result
1	Kangra	1 June 2024	Anand Sharma	INC	Lost
2	Mandi	1 June 2024	Vikramaditya Singh	INC	Lost
3	Hamirpur	1 June 2024	Satpal Singh Raizada	INC	Lost
4	Shimla (SC)	1 June 2024	Vinod Sultanpuri	INC	Lost

== Jammu and Kashmir ==
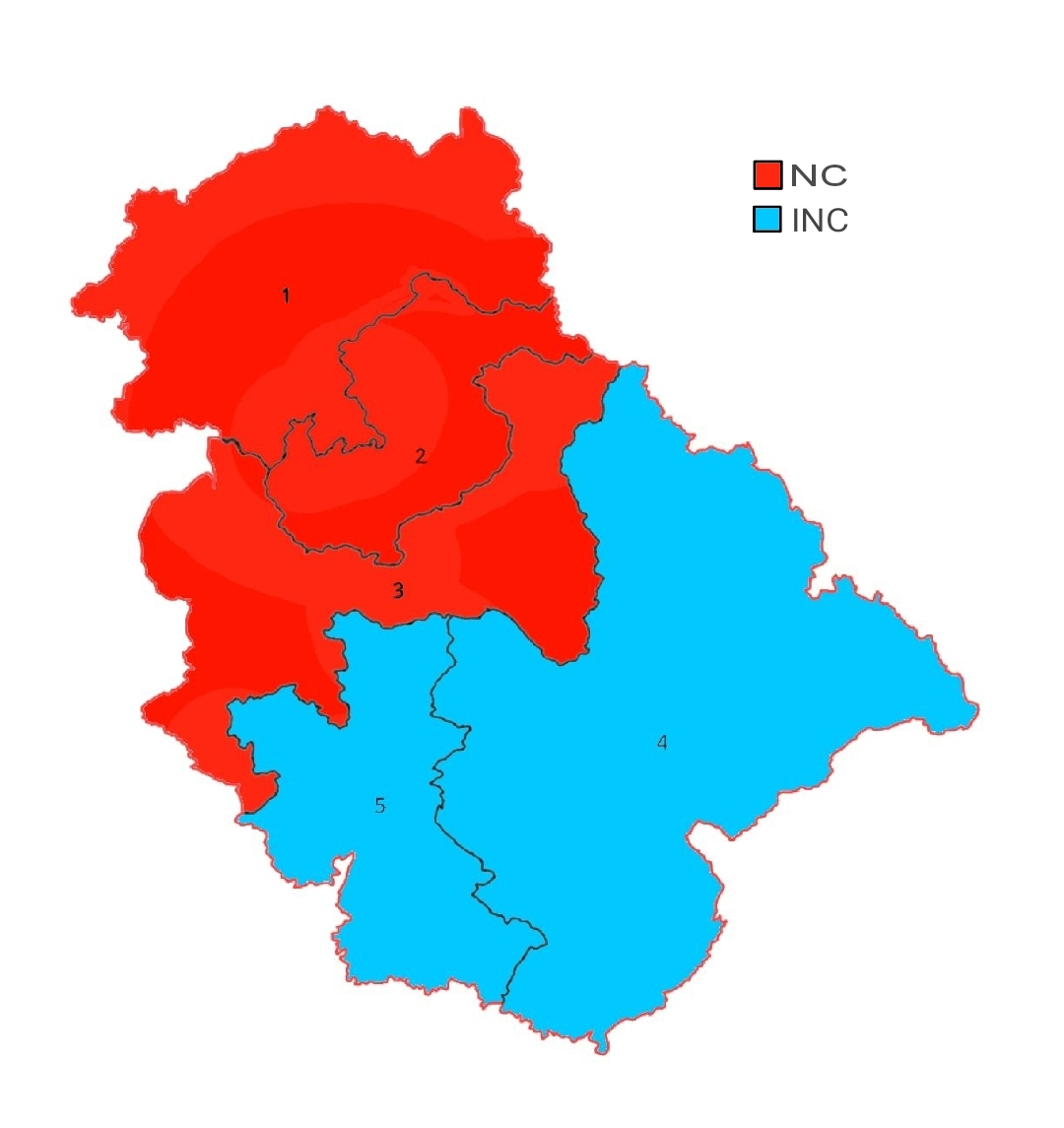

- INDIA Seat-sharing

JKNC (3)
INC (2)

- Other Parties of INDIA

JKPDP (3)
AIFB (2)

Constituency		Poll on	Candidate			Result		
Constituency		Poll on	1	Baramulla	20 May 2024	Omar Abdullah	JKNC	Lost
Mir Fayaz		JKPDP	1	Baramulla	20 May 2024	Lost		
2	Srinagar	13 May 2024	Syed Ruhullah Mehdi		JKNC	Won		
2	Srinagar	13 May 2024	Waheed Parra		JKPDP	Lost		
3	Anantnag–Rajouri	7 May 2024	Mian Altaf Ahmed Larvi		JKNC	Won		
3	Anantnag–Rajouri	7 May 2024	Mehbooba Mufti		JKPDP	Lost		
3	Anantnag–Rajouri	7 May 2024	Javaid Ahmed		AIFB	Lost		
4	Udhampur	19 April 2024	Chaudhary Lal Singh		INC	Lost		
5	Jammu	26 April 2024	Raman Bhalla		INC	Lost		
5	Jammu	26 April 2024	Qari Zaheer Abbas Bhatti		AIFB	Lost		

Friendly Contest
Friendly Contest

== Jharkhand ==
- INDIA Seat-sharing

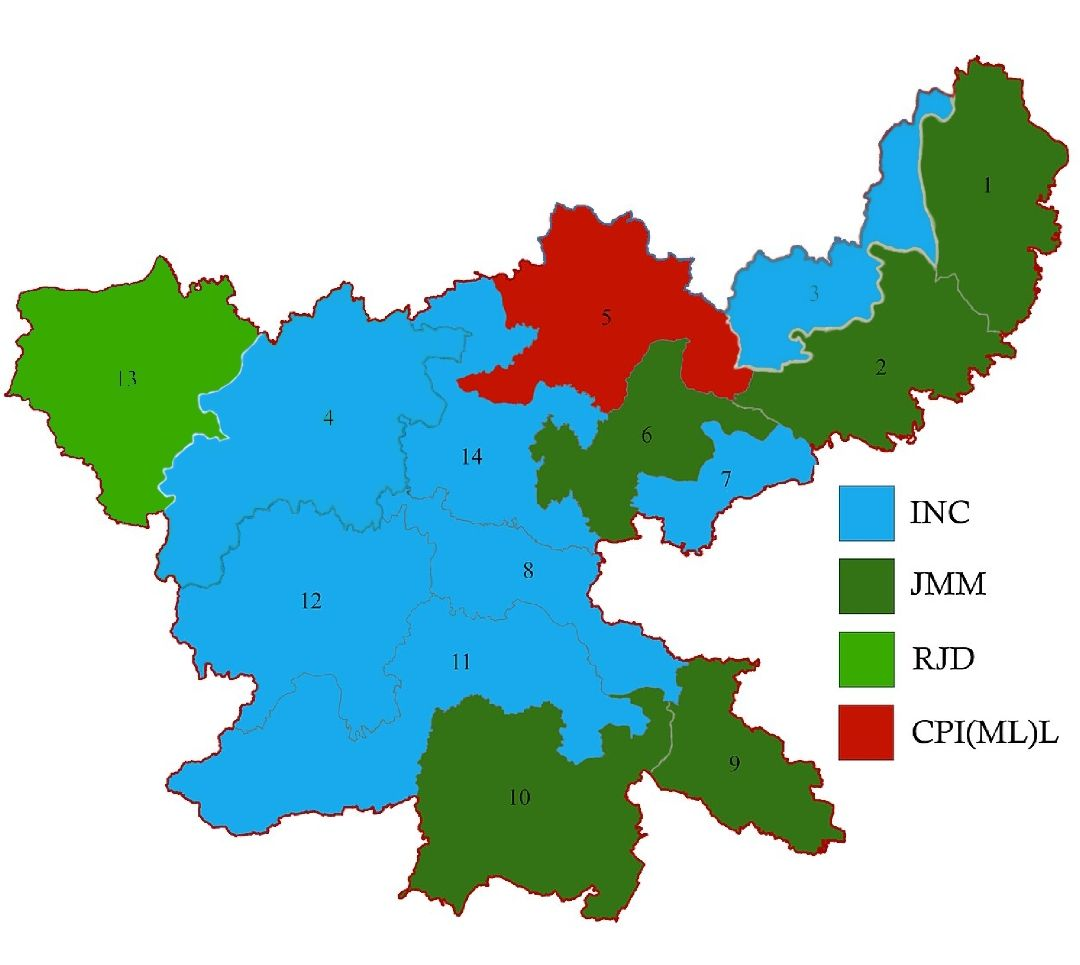

INC (7)
JMM (5)
RJD (1)
CPI(ML)L (1)

- Others Parties of INDIA

CPI (4)
BAP (2)
CPI(M) (1)

Constituency		Poll on			
Constituency		Poll on	Candidate		Result
1	Rajmahal (ST)	1 June 2024	Vijay Kumar Hansdak	JMM	Won
1	Rajmahal (ST)	1 June 2024	Gopen Soren	CPI(M)	Lost
2	Dumka (ST)	1 June 2024	Nalin Soren	JMM	Won
2	Dumka (ST)	1 June 2024	Rajesh Kumar	CPI	Lost
3	Godda	1 June 2024	Pradeep Yadav	INC	Lost
4	Chatra	20 May 2024	Krishna Nand Tripathi	INC	Lost
4	Chatra	20 May 2024	Arjun Kumar	CPI	Lost
5	Kodarma	20 May 2024	Vinod Kumar Singh	CPI(ML)L	Lost
6	Giridih	25 May 2024	Mathura Prasad Mahto	JMM	Lost
7	Dhanbad	25 May 2024	Anupama Singh	INC	Lost
8	Ranchi	25 May 2024	Yashashwini Sahay	INC	Lost
9	Jamshedpur	25 May 2024	Samir Mohanty	JMM	Lost
9	Jamshedpur	25 May 2024	Sukumar Soren	BAP	Lost
10	Singhbhum (ST)	13 May 2024	Joba Majhi	JMM	Won
11	Khunti (ST)	13 May 2024	Kali Charan Munda	INC	Won
11	Khunti (ST)	13 May 2024	Babita Kashchap	BAP	Lost
12	Lohardaga (ST)	13 May 2024	Sukhdeo Bhagat	INC	Won
12	Lohardaga (ST)	13 May 2024	Mahendra Urav	CPI	Lost
13	Palamau (SC)	13 May 2024	Mamta Bhuiyan	RJD	Lost
14	Hazaribagh	20 May 2024	Jai Prakash Bhai Patel	INC	Lost
14	Hazaribagh	20 May 2024	Aniruddh Kumar	CPI	Lost

Friendly Contest

== Karnataka ==
INC (28)
VCK (2)
CPI(M) (1)

Constituency		Poll on	Candidate			Result		
Constituency		Poll on	1	Chikkodi	7 May 2024	Priyanka Jarkiholi	INC	Won
2	Belgaum	Mrunal Ravindra Hebbalkar		INC	7 May 2024	Lost		
3	Bagalkot	Samyukta S Patil		INC	7 May 2024	Lost		
4	Bijapur (SC)	H. R. Algur		INC	7 May 2024	Lost		
5	Gulbarga (SC)	Radhakrishna Doddamani		INC	7 May 2024	Won		
6	Raichur (ST)	G Kumar Naik		INC	7 May 2024	Won		
7	Bidar	Sagar Eshwar Khandre		INC	7 May 2024	Won		
8	Koppal	K. Rajashekar Basavaraj Hitnal		INC	7 May 2024	Won		
9	Bellary (ST)	E. Tukaram		INC	7 May 2024	Won		
10	Haveri	Anandswamy Gaddadevarmath		INC	7 May 2024	Lost		
11	Dharwad	Vinod Asooti		INC	7 May 2024	Lost		
12	Uttara Kannada	Anjali Nimbalkar		INC	7 May 2024	Lost		
13	Davanagere	Prabha Mallikarjun		INC	7 May 2024	Won		
14	Shimoga	Geetha Shivarajkumar		INC	7 May 2024	Lost		
15	Udupi Chikmagalur	26 April 2024	K. Jayaprakash Hegde		INC	Lost		
16	Hassan	26 April 2024	Shreyas. M. Patel		INC	Won		
17	Dakshina Kannada	26 April 2024	Padmaraj		INC	Lost		
18	Chitradurga (SC)	26 April 2024	B. N. Chandrappa		INC	Lost		
19	Tumkur	26 April 2024	S. P. Muddahanumegowda		INC	Lost		
20	Mandya	26 April 2024	Venkataramane Gowda		INC	Lost		
21	Mysore	26 April 2024	M Lakshman		INC	Lost		
22	Chamarajanagar (SC)	26 April 2024	Sunil Bose		INC	Won		
23	Bangalore Rural	26 April 2024	D. K. Suresh		INC	Lost		
23	Bangalore Rural	26 April 2024	H. V. Chandrashekhar		VCK	Lost		
24	Bangalore North	26 April 2024	Rajeev Gowda		INC	Lost		
25	Bangalore Central	26 April 2024	Mansoor Ali Khan		INC	Lost		
26	Bangalore South	26 April 2024	Sowmya Reddy		INC	Lost		
27	Chikballapur	26 April 2024	Raksha Ramaiah		INC	Lost		
27	Chikballapur	26 April 2024	M P Munivenkatappa		CPI(M)	Lost		
28	Kolar (SC)	26 April 2024	K V Gowtham		INC	Lost		
28	Kolar (SC)	26 April 2024	M C Halli Venu		VCK	Lost		

Friendly Contest
Friendly Contest

== Kerala ==
The ruling LDF and the opposition UDF contested separately in Kerala.

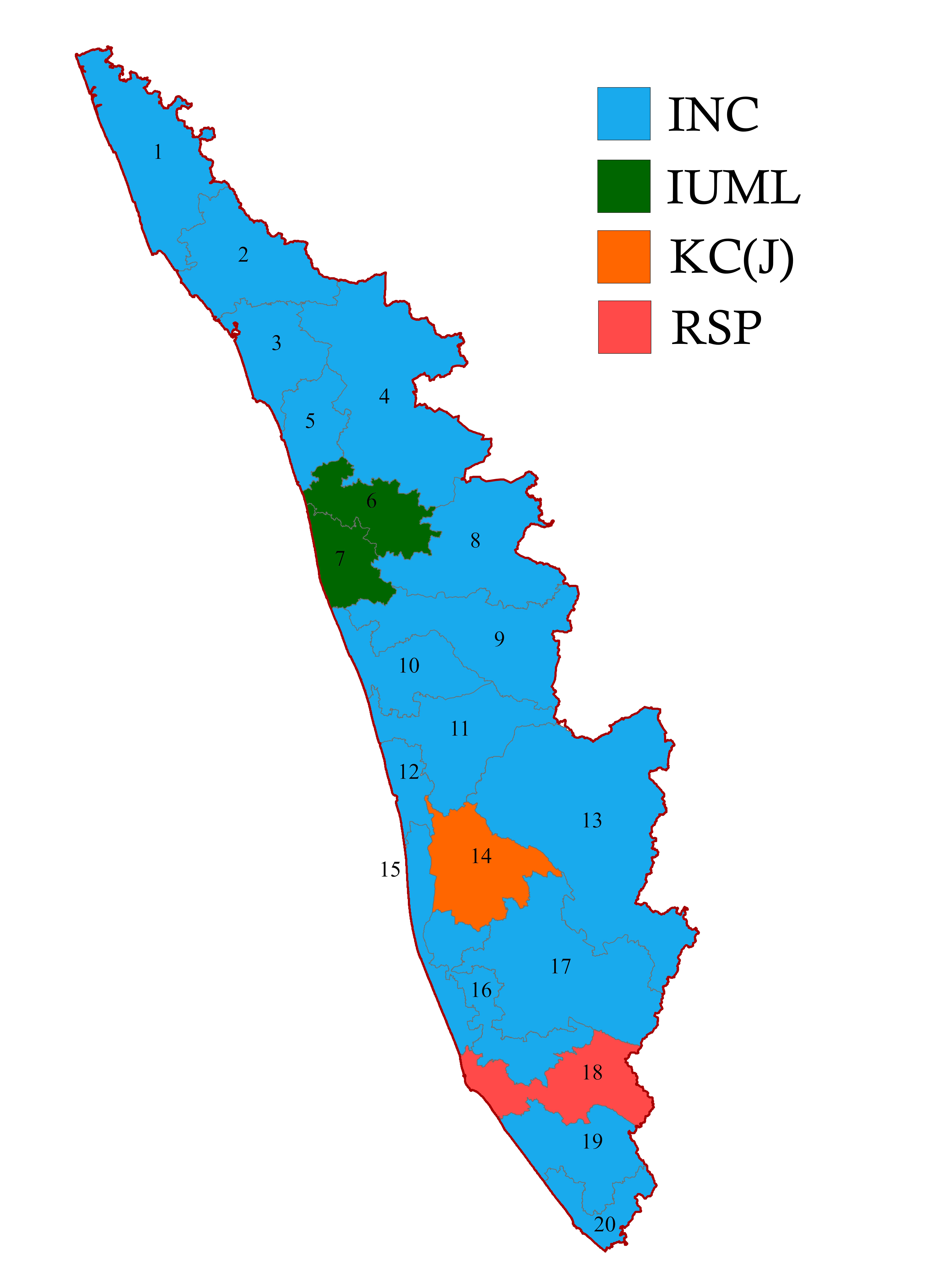

- UDF Seat-sharing

INC (16)
IUML (2)
RSP (1)
KEC (1)

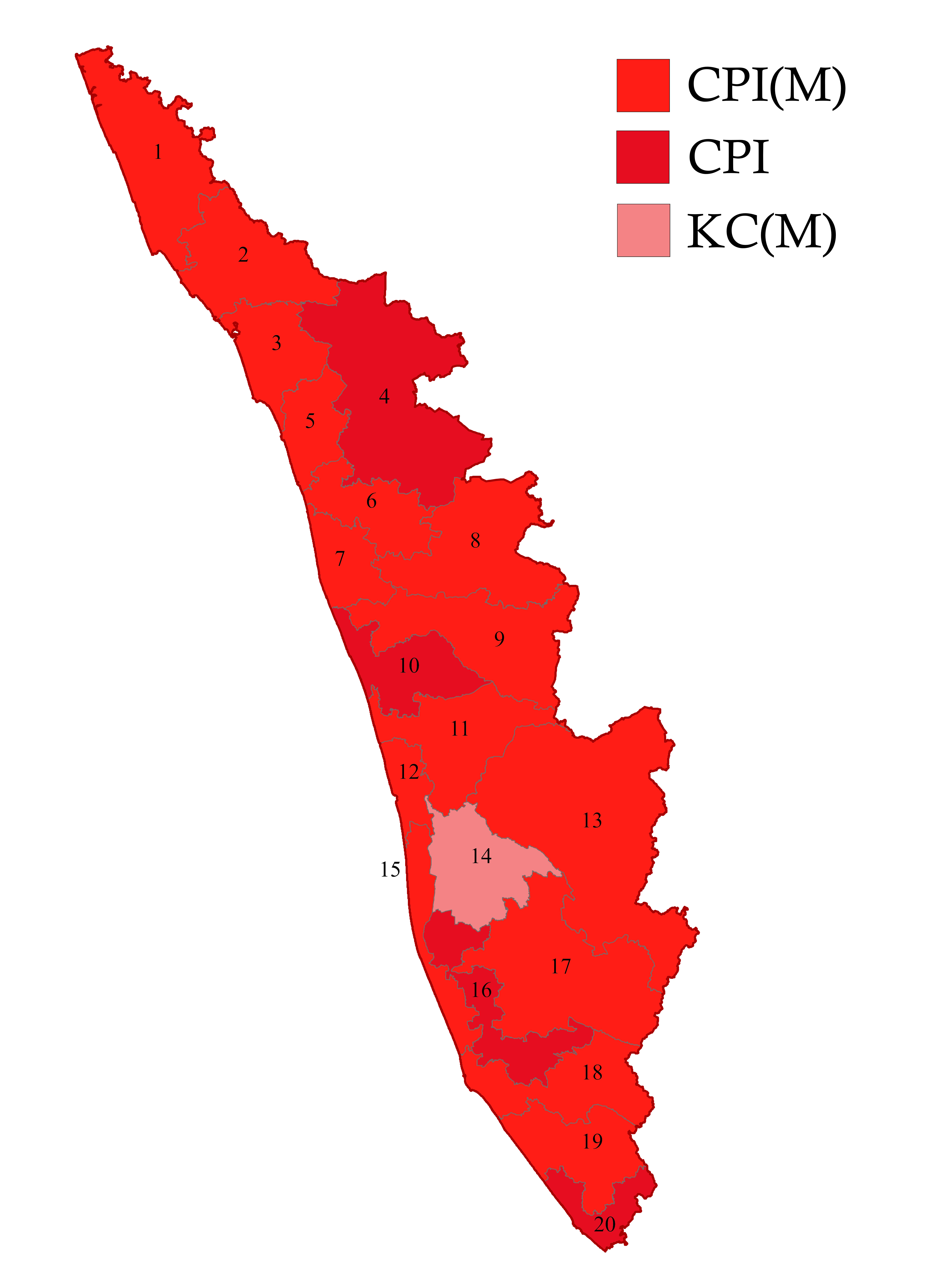

- LDF Seat-sharing

CPI(M) (15)
CPI (4)
KC(M) (1)

- Other Parties of INDIA

VCK (1)

Constituency		Poll On	United Democratic Front			Left Democratic Front		
Constituency		Poll On	Candidate		Result	Candidate		Result
1	Kasaragod	26 April 2024	Rajmohan Unnithan	INC	Won	M. V. Balakrishnan	CPI(M)	Lost
2	Kannur	26 April 2024	K. Sudhakaran	INC	Won	M. V. Jayarajan	CPI(M)	Lost
3	Vatakara	26 April 2024	Shafi Parambil	INC	Won	K. K. Shailaja	CPI(M)	Lost
4	Wayanad	26 April 2024	Rahul Gandhi (Note: Contested in both Wayanad and Raebareli seats.)	INC	Won	Annie Raja	CPI	Lost
5	Kozhikode	26 April 2024	M. K. Raghavan	INC	Won	Elamaram Kareem	CPI(M)	Lost
6	Malappuram	26 April 2024	E. T. Mohammed Basheer	IUML	Won	V. Vaseef	CPI(M)	Lost
7	Ponnani	26 April 2024	Abdussamad Samadani	IUML	Won	K.S. Hamza	CPI(M)	Lost
8	Palakkad	26 April 2024	V. K. Sreekandan	INC	Won	A. Vijayaraghavan	CPI(M)	Lost
9	Alathur (SC)	26 April 2024	Ramya Haridas	INC	Lost	K. Radhakrishnan	CPI(M)	Won
10	Thrissur	26 April 2024	K. Muraleedharan	INC	Lost	V. S. Sunil Kumar	CPI	Lost
11	Chalakudy	26 April 2024	Benny Behanan	INC	Won	C. Raveendranath	CPI(M)	Lost
12	Ernakulam	26 April 2024	Hibi Eden	INC	Won	K. J. Shine	CPI(M)	Lost
13	Idukki	26 April 2024	Dean Kuriakose	INC	Won	Joice George	CPI(M)	Lost
13	Idukki	26 April 2024	Saji Alias Shaji	VCK	Lost	Joice George	CPI(M)	Lost
14	Kottayam	26 April 2024	Francis George	KEC	Won	Thomas Chazhikadan	KC(M)	Lost
15	Alappuzha	26 April 2024	K. C. Venugopal	INC	Won	A. M. Ariff	CPI(M)	Lost
16	Mavelikara (SC)	26 April 2024	Kodikunnil Suresh	INC	Won	C. A. Arun Kumar	CPI	Lost
17	Pathanamthitta	26 April 2024	Anto Antony	INC	Won	Thomas Issac	CPI(M)	Lost
18	Kollam	26 April 2024	N. K. Premachandran	RSP	Won	Mukesh Madhavan	CPI(M)	Lost
19	Attingal	26 April 2024	Adoor Prakash	INC	Won	V. Joy	CPI(M)	Lost
20	Thiruvananthapuram	26 April 2024	Shashi Tharoor	INC	Won	Pannyan Raveendran	CPI	Lost

Friendly Contest

== Ladakh ==
INC (1)

Constituency		Poll On	Candidate		Result
1	Ladakh	20 May 2024	Tsering Namgyal	INC	Lost

== Lakshadweep ==
INC (1)
NCP-SP (1)

Constituency		Poll On			
Constituency		Poll On	Candidate		Result
1	Lakshadweep	19 April 2024	Muhammed Hamdulla Sayeed	INC	Won
1	Lakshadweep	19 April 2024	Mohammed Faizal Padippura	NCP-SP	Lost

Friendly Contest

== Madhya Pradesh ==
- INDIA Seat-sharing

INC (27)
AIFB (1)

- Others Parties of INDIA

BAP (5)
CPI (3)

Constituency		Poll On	Candidate		Result
1	Morena	7 May 2024	Satyapal Singh Sikarwar	INC	Lost
2	Bhind (SC)	7 May 2024	Phool Singh Baraiya	INC	Lost
3	Gwalior	7 May 2024	Praveen Pathak	INC	Lost
4	Guna	7 May 2024	Rao Yadvendra Singh	INC	Lost
5	Sagar	7 May 2024	Guddu Raja Bundela	INC	Lost
6	Tikamgarh (SC)	26 April 2024	Pankaj Ahirwar	INC	Lost
7	Damoh	26 April 2024	Tarvar Singh Lodhi	INC	Lost
7	Damoh	26 April 2024	Manu Singh Maravi	BAP	Lost
8	Khajuraho	26 April 2024	R. B. Prajapati	AIFB	Lost
9	Satna	26 April 2024	Siddharth Kushwaha	INC	Lost
10	Rewa	26 April 2024	Nilam Mishra	INC	Lost
11	Sidhi	19 April 2024	Kamleshwar Patel	INC	Lost
11	Sidhi	19 April 2024	Sanjay Namdeo	CPI	Lost
12	Shahdol (ST)	19 April 2024	Phundelal Singh Marko	INC	Lost
12	Shahdol (ST)	19 April 2024	Samar Shah Singh Gond	CPI	Lost
13	Jabalpur	19 April 2024	Dinesh Yadav	INC	Lost
14	Mandla (ST)	19 April 2024	Omkar Markam	INC	Lost
14	Mandla (ST)	19 April 2024	Charan Singh Dhurve	BAP	Lost
15	Balaghat	19 April 2024	Samrat Saraswat	INC	Lost
16	Chhindwara	19 April 2024	Nakul Nath	INC	Lost
17	Hoshangabad	26 April 2024	Sanjay Sharma	INC	Lost
18	Vidisha	7 May 2024	Pratap Bhanu Sharma	INC	Lost
19	Bhopal	7 May 2024	Arun Srivastava	INC	Lost
20	Rajgarh	7 May 2024	Digvijay Singh	INC	Lost
21	Dewas (SC)	13 May 2024	Rajendra Malviya	INC	Lost
22	Ujjain (SC)	13 May 2024	Mahesh Parmar	INC	Lost
23	Mandsaur	13 May 2024	Dilip Singh Gurjar	INC	Lost
24	Ratlam (ST)	13 May 2024	Kantilal Bhuria	INC	Lost
24	Ratlam (ST)	13 May 2024	Balu Singh Gamad	BAP	Lost
25	Dhar (ST)	13 May 2024	Radheshyam Muvel	INC	Lost
25	Dhar (ST)	13 May 2024	Jitendra Muniya	BAP	Lost
26	Indore	13 May 2024	DNC		
27	Khargone (ST)	13 May 2024	Porlal Kharte	INC	Lost
27	Khargone (ST)	13 May 2024	Devisingh Nargave	CPI	Lost
28	Khandwa	13 May 2024	Narendra Patel	INC	Lost
29	Betul (ST)	7 May 2024	Ramu Tekam	INC	Lost
29	Betul (ST)	7 May 2024	Anil Uike	BAP	Lost

Friendly Contest

== Maharashtra ==

- INDIA Seat-sharing

SS(UBT) (21)
INC (17)
NCP-SP (10)

- Others Parties of INDIA

AIFB (8)
BAP (4)
CPI (1)
CPI(M) (1)

Constituency		Poll On	Candidate		Result
1	Nandurbar (ST)	13 May 2024	Gowaal Kagada Padavi	INC	Won
1	Nandurbar (ST)	13 May 2024	Ravindra Ranjit Valvi	BAP	Lost
2	Dhule	20 May 2024	Bachhav Shobha Dinesh	INC	Won
2	Dhule	20 May 2024	Patil Shivaji Nathu	AIFB	Lost
3	Jalgaon	13 May 2024	Karan Pawar	SS(UBT)	Lost
4	Raver	13 May 2024	Shriram Patil	NCP-SP	Lost
4	Raver	13 May 2024	Ghulam Dayaram Bhil	BAP	Lost
5	Buldhana	26 April 2024	Narendra Khedekar	SS(UBT)	Lost
6	Akola	26 April 2024	Dr. Abhay Kashinath Patil	INC	Lost
7	Amravati (SC)	26 April 2024	Balwant Baswant Wankhade	INC	Won
7	Amravati (SC)	26 April 2024	Bhaurao Sampatrao Wankhede	AIFB	Lost
8	Wardha	26 April 2024	Amar Sharadrao Kale	NCP-SP	Won
8	Wardha	26 April 2024	Ramrao Bajirao Ghondaskar	AIFB	Lost
9	Ramtek (SC)	19 April 2024	Shyamkumar Barve	INC	Won
10	Nagpur	19 April 2024	Vikas Thakre	INC	Lost
10	Nagpur	19 April 2024	Santosh Ramkrishna Lanjewar	AIFB	Lost
11	Bhandara-Gondiya	19 April 2024	Prashant Yadaorao Padole	INC	Won
12	Gadchiroli-Chimur (ST)	19 April 2024	Namdeo Kirsan	INC	Won
13	Chandrapur-Wani-Arni	19 April 2024	Pratibha Dhanorkar	INC	Won
14	Yavatmal-Washim	26 April 2024	Sanjay Deshmukh	SS(UBT)	Won
15	Hingoli	26 April 2024	Nagesh Bapurao Patil Ashtikar	SS(UBT)	Won
15	Hingoli	26 April 2024	Vijay Ramji Gabhane	CPI(M)	Lost
16	Nanded	26 April 2024	Vasantrao Balwantrao Chavan	INC	Won
17	Parbhani	26 April 2024	Sanjay Jadhav	SS(UBT)	Won
17	Parbhani	26 April 2024	Rajan Kshirsagar	CPI	Lost
18	Jalna	13 May 2024	Kalyan Kale	INC	Won
19	Aurangabad	13 May 2024	Chandrakant Khaire	SS(UBT)	Lost
20	Dindori (ST)	20 May 2024	Bhaskar Murlidhar Bhagare	NCP-SP	Won
21	Nashik	20 May 2024	Rajabhau Waje	SS(UBT)	Won
22	Palghar (ST)	20 May 2024	Bharti Kamadi	SS(UBT)	Lost
22	Palghar (ST)	20 May 2024	Mohan Ghoohe	BAP	Lost
23	Bhiwandi	20 May 2024	Suresh Mhatre	NCP-SP	Won
24	Kalyan	20 May 2024	Vaishali Darekar	SS(UBT)	Lost
25	Thane	20 May 2024	Rajan Vichare	SS(UBT)	Lost
26	Mumbai North	20 May 2024	Bhushan Patil	INC	Lost
27	Mumbai North West	20 May 2024	Amol Kirtikar	SS(UBT)	Lost
28	Mumbai North East	20 May 2024	Sanjay Dina Patil	SS(UBT)	Won
28	Mumbai North East	20 May 2024	Surendra Sibag	AIFB	Lost
29	Mumbai North Central	20 May 2024	Varsha Gaikwad	INC	Won
30	Mumbai South Central	20 May 2024	Anil Desai	SS(UBT)	Won
31	Mumbai South	20 May 2024	Arvind Sawant	SS(UBT)	Won
32	Raigad	7 May 2024	Anant Geete	SS(UBT)	Lost
33	Maval	13 May 2024	Sanjog Waghere Patil	SS(UBT)	Lost
33	Maval	13 May 2024	Shivaji Kisan Jadhav	AIFB	Lost
34	Pune	13 May 2024	Ravindra Dhangekar	INC	Lost
35	Baramati	7 May 2024	Supriya Sule	NCP-SP	Won
36	Shirur	13 May 2024	Amol Kolhe	NCP-SP	Won
36	Shirur	13 May 2024	Laxman Ram Bhau Damle	BAP	Lost
37	Ahmednagar	13 May 2024	Nilesh Dnyandev Lanke	NCP-SP	Won
38	Shirdi (SC)	13 May 2024	Bhausaheb Rajaram Wakchaure	SS(UBT)	Won
39	Beed	13 May 2024	Bajrang Manohar Sonwane	NCP-SP	Won
40	Osmanabad	7 May 2024	Omprakash Rajenimbalkar	SS(UBT)	Won
41	Latur (SC)	7 May 2024	Kalge Shivaji Bandappa	INC	Won
42	Solapur (SC)	7 May 2024	Praniti Shinde	INC	Won
43	Madha	7 May 2024	Dhairyasheel Patil	NCP-SP	Won
43	Madha	7 May 2024	Aware Siddheshwar Bharat	AIFB	Lost
44	Sangli	7 May 2024	Chandrahar Patil	SS(UBT)	Lost
45	Satara	7 May 2024	Shashikant Shinde	NCP-SP	Lost
46	Ratnagiri-Sindhudurg	7 May 2024	Vinayak Raut	SS(UBT)	Lost
47	Kolhapur	7 May 2024	Chhatrapati Shahu Maharaj	INC	Won
48	Hatkanangle	7 May 2024	Satyajeet Patil	SS(UBT)	Lost
48	Hatkanangle	7 May 2024	Dinakarrao Tulshidas Chavan (Patil)	AIFB	Lost

Friendly Contest

== Manipur ==
INC (2)

Constituency		Poll on		Candidate		Result
1	Inner Manipur	19 April 2024		Angomcha Bimol Akoijam	INC	Won
2	Outer Manipur (ST)	19 April 2024	26 April 2024	Alfred Kan-Ngam Arthur	INC	Won

== Meghalaya ==
INC (2)
AITC (1)

Constituency		Poll on	Candidate			Result		
Constituency		Poll on	1	Shillong (ST)	19 April 2024	Vincent Pala	INC	Lost
2	Tura (ST)	Saleng A. Sangma		INC	19 April 2024	Won		
2	Tura (ST)	Zenith Sangma		AITC	19 April 2024	Lost		

Friendly Contest

== Mizoram ==
INC (1)

Constituency		Poll On	Candidate		Result
1	Mizoram (ST)	19 April 2024	Lalbiakzama	INC	Lost

== Nagaland ==
INC (1)

Constituency		Poll On	Candidate		Result
1	Nagaland	19 April 2024	S. Supongmeren Jamir	INC	Won

== Odisha ==
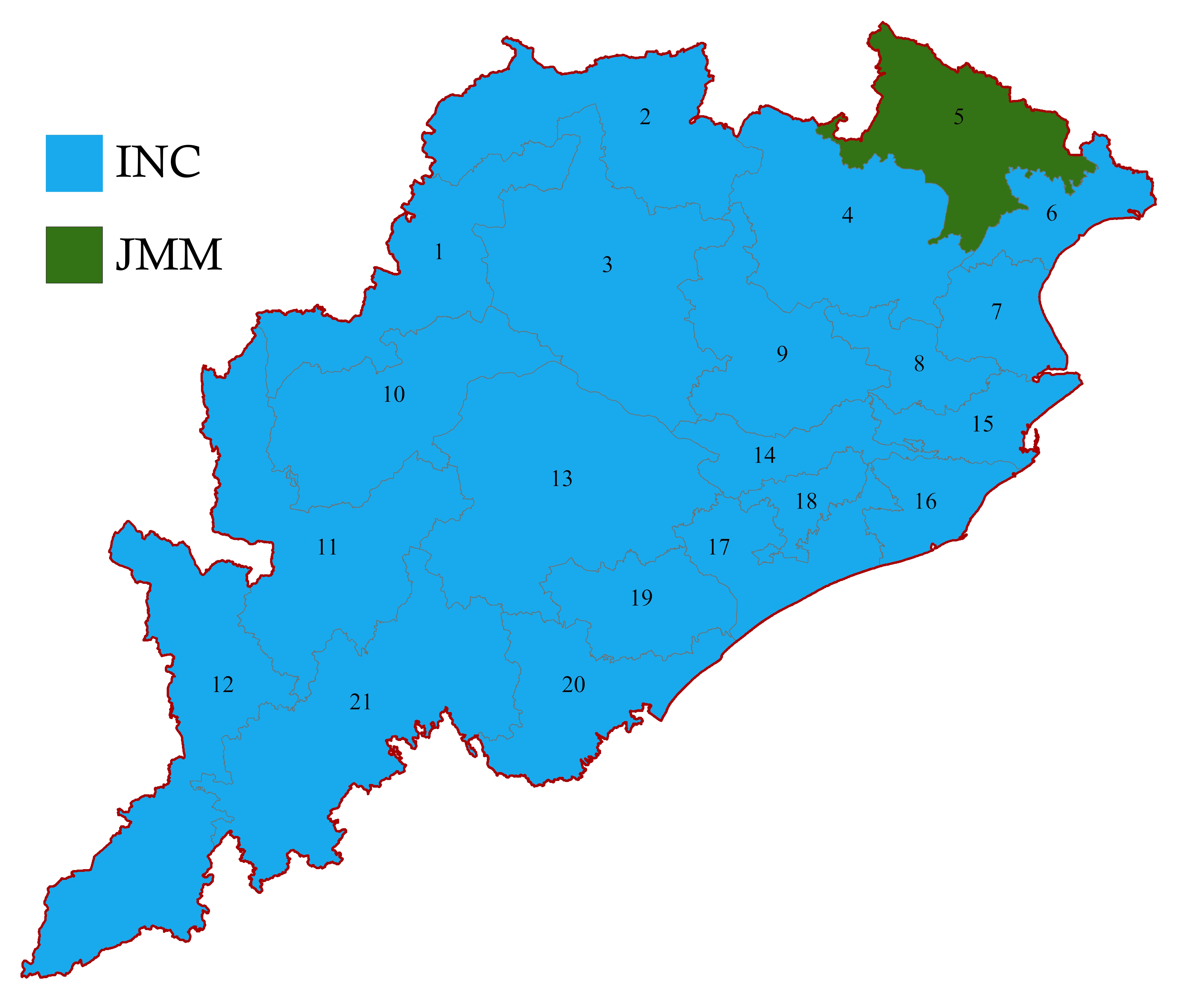

- INDIA Seat-sharing

INC (20)
JMM (1)

- Others Parties of INDIA

AIFB (1)
CPI (1)
CPI(M) (1)
CPI(ML)L (1)
SP (1)

Constituency		Poll On	Candidate		Result
1	Bargarh	20 May 2024	Sanjay Bhoi	INC	Lost
2	Sundargarh (ST)	20 May 2024	Janardan Dehury	INC	Lost
3	Sambalpur	25 May 2024	Nagendra Kumar Pradhan	INC	Lost
4	Keonjhar (ST)	25 May 2024	Binod Bihari Nayak	INC	Lost
5	Mayurbhanj (ST)	1 June 2024	Anjani Soren	JMM	Lost
6	Balasore	1 June 2024	Srikant Kumar Jena	INC	Lost
7	Bhadrak (SC)	1 June 2024	Anant Prasad Sethi	INC	Lost
8	Jajpur (SC)	1 June 2024	Anchal Das	INC	Lost
9	Dhenkanal	25 May 2024	Sashmita Behera	INC	Lost
10	Bolangir	20 May 2024	Manoj Mishra	INC	Lost
11	Kalahandi	13 May 2024	Draupadi Majhi	INC	Lost
11	Kalahandi	13 May 2024	Siba Hati	SP	Lost
12	Nabarangpur (ST)	13 May 2024	Bhujabal Majhi	INC	Lost
13	Kandhamal	20 May 2024	Amir Chand Nayak	INC	Lost
14	Cuttack	25 May 2024	Suresh Mohapatra	INC	Lost
15	Kendrapara	1 June 2024	Sidharth Swarup Das	INC	Lost
16	Jagatsinghpur (SC)	1 June 2024	Rabindra Kumar Sethy	INC	Lost
16	Jagatsinghpur (SC)	1 June 2024	Ramesh Chandra Sethi	CPI	Lost
17	Puri	25 May 2024	Jay Narayan Patnaik	INC	Lost
18	Bhubaneswar	25 May 2024	Yasir Nawaz	INC	Lost
18	Bhubaneswar	25 May 2024	Suresh Chandra Panigrahy	CPI(M)	Lost
19	Aska	20 May 2024	Debokanta Sharma	INC	Lost
20	Berhampur	13 May 2024	Rashmi Ranjan Patnaik	INC	Lost
20	Berhampur	13 May 2024	Santosh Kumar Sahu	AIFB	Lost
21	Koraput (ST)	13 May 2024	Saptagiri Sankar Ulaka	INC	Won
21	Koraput (ST)	13 May 2024	Prakash Hikaka	CPI(ML)L	Lost

Friendly Contest

== Puducherry ==
INC (1)

Constituency		Poll On	Candidate		Result
1	Puducherry	19 April 2024	V. Vaithilingam	INC	Won

== Punjab ==
The ruling AAP and the opposition INC contested separately in Punjab. AAP (13)
INC (13)
CPI (3)
RSP (2)
CPI(M) (1)

Constituency		Poll On	Indian National Congress			Aam Aadmi Party		
Constituency		Poll On	Candidate		Result	Candidate		Result
1	Gurdaspur	1 June 2024	Sukhjinder Singh Randhawa	INC	Won	Amansher Singh (Shery Kalsi)	AAP	Lost
2	Amritsar	1 June 2024	Gurjeet Singh Aujla	INC	Won	Kuldeep Singh Dhaliwal	AAP	Lost
2	Amritsar	1 June 2024	Gurjeet Singh Aujla	INC	Won	Daswinder Kaur	CPI	Lost
3	Khadoor Sahib	1 June 2024	Kulbir Singh Zira	INC	Lost	Laljit Singh Bhullar	AAP	Lost
3	Khadoor Sahib	1 June 2024	Kulbir Singh Zira	INC	Lost	Gurdial Singh	CPI	Lost
4	Jalandhar (SC)	1 June 2024	Charanjit Singh Channi	INC	Won	Pawan Kumar Tinu	AAP	Lost
4	Jalandhar (SC)	1 June 2024	Charanjit Singh Channi	INC	Won	Purshottam Lal Bilga	CPI(M)	Lost
5	Hoshiarpur (SC)	1 June 2024	Yamini Gomar	INC	Lost	Raj Kumar Chabbewal	AAP	Won
6	Anandpur Sahib	1 June 2024	Vijay Inder Singla	INC	Lost	Malvinder Singh Kang	AAP	Won
6	Anandpur Sahib	1 June 2024	Vijay Inder Singla	INC	Lost	Yog Raj Sahota	RSP	Lost
7	Ludhiana	1 June 2024	Amrinder Singh Raja Warring	INC	Won	Ashok Parashar Pappi	AAP	Lost
8	Fatehgarh Sahib (SC)	1 June 2024	Amar Singh	INC	Won	Gurpreet Singh GP	AAP	Lost
9	Faridkot (SC)	1 June 2024	Amarjit Kaur Sahoke	INC	Lost	Karamjit Anmol	AAP	Lost
9	Faridkot (SC)	1 June 2024	Amarjit Kaur Sahoke	INC	Lost	Gurcharan Singh Mann	CPI	Lost
10	Firozpur	1 June 2024	Sher Singh Ghubaya	INC	Won	Jagdeep Singh Kaka Brar	AAP	Lost
11	Bathinda	1 June 2024	Jeet Mohinder Singh Sidhu	INC	Lost	Gurmeet Singh Khuddian	AAP	Lost
12	Sangrur	1 June 2024	Sukhpal Singh Khaira	INC	Lost	Gurmeet Singh Meet Hayer	AAP	Won
13	Patiala	1 June 2024	Dharamvir Gandhi	INC	Won	Dr. Balbir Singh	AAP	Lost
13	Patiala	1 June 2024	Dharamvir Gandhi	INC	Won	Mandeep Singh	RSP	Lost

Friendly Contest

== Rajasthan ==
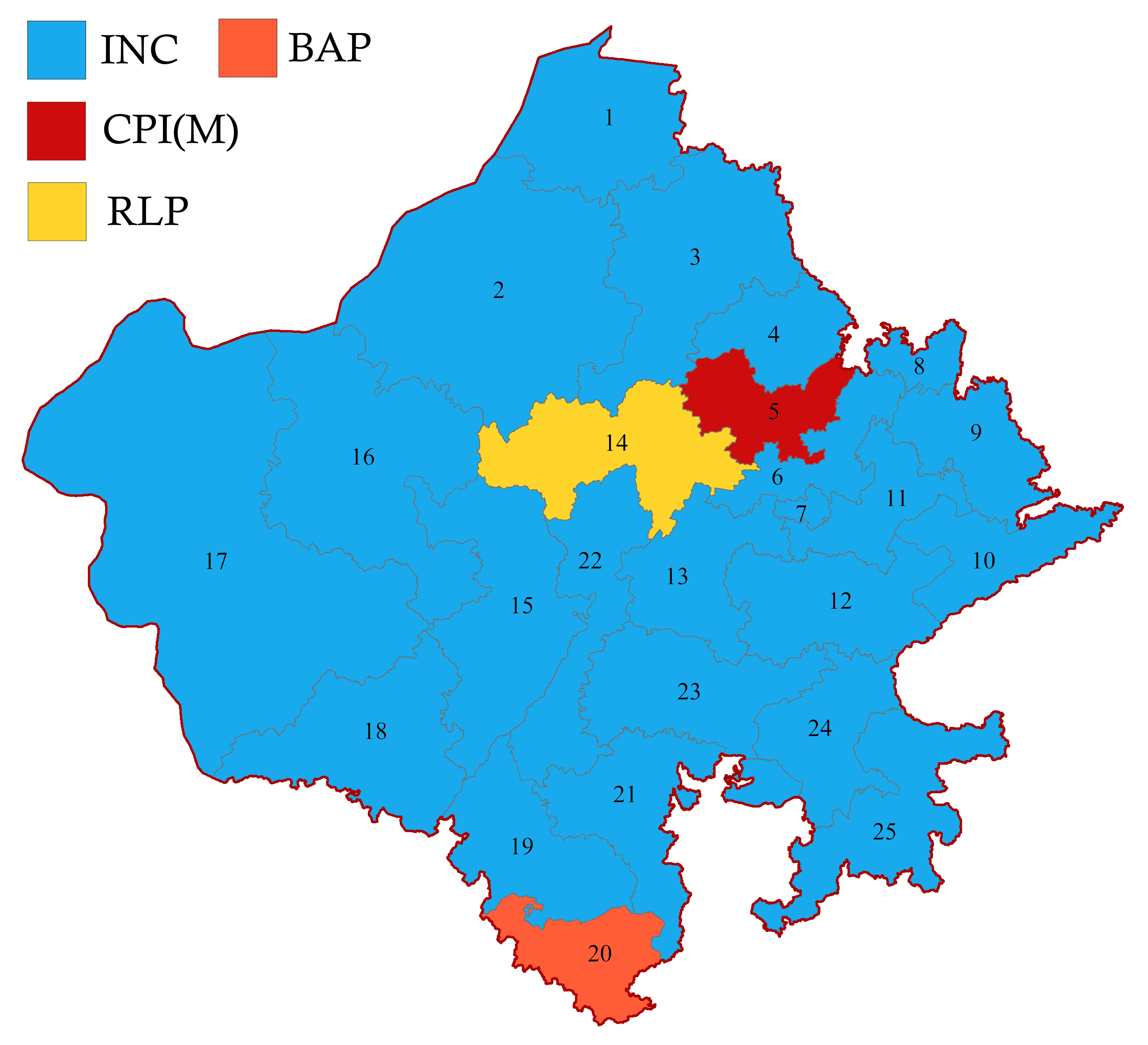

- INDIA Seat-sharing

INC (22) (Note: Congress supported the BAP candidate in Banswara seat.)
BAP (1)
CPI(M) (1)
RLP (1)

- Other Parties of INDIA

BAP (5)
INC (1)

Constituency		Poll On	Candidate		Result
1	Ganganagar (SC)	19 April 2024	Kuldeep Indora	INC	Won
2	Bikaner (SC)	19 April 2024	Govind Ram Meghwal	INC	Lost
3	Churu	19 April 2024	Rahul Kaswan	INC	Won
4	Jhunjhunu	19 April 2024	Brijendra Singh Ola	INC	Won
5	Sikar	19 April 2024	Amra Ram	CPI(M)	Won
6	Jaipur Rural	19 April 2024	Anil Chopra	INC	Lost
7	Jaipur	19 April 2024	Pratap Singh Khachariyawas	INC	Lost
8	Alwar	19 April 2024	Lalit Yadav	INC	Lost
9	Bharatpur (SC)	19 April 2024	Sanjana Jatav	INC	Won
10	Karauli–Dholpur (SC)	19 April 2024	Bhajan Lal Jatav	INC	Won
11	Dausa (ST)	19 April 2024	Murari Lal Meena	INC	Won
12	Tonk–Sawai Madhopur	26 April 2024	Harish Meena	INC	Won
12	Tonk–Sawai Madhopur	26 April 2024	Jagdish Prasad Meena	BAP	Lost
13	Ajmer	26 April 2024	Ramchandra Choudhary	INC	Lost
14	Nagaur	19 April 2024	Hanuman Beniwal	RLP	Won
15	Pali	26 April 2024	Sangeeta Beniwal	INC	Lost
15	Pali	26 April 2024	Jeevaram Rana	BAP	Lost
16	Jodhpur	26 April 2024	Karan Singh Uchiyarda	INC	Lost
17	Barmer	26 April 2024	Ummeda Ram Beniwal	INC	Won
18	Jalore	26 April 2024	Vaibhav Gehlot	INC	Lost
18	Jalore	26 April 2024	Otaram Meghwal	BAP	Lost
19	Udaipur (ST)	26 April 2024	Tarachand Meena	INC	Lost
19	Udaipur (ST)	26 April 2024	Parkash Chand	BAP	Lost
20	Banswara (ST)	26 April 2024	Arvind Damor	INC	Lost
20	Banswara (ST)	26 April 2024	Rajkumar Roat	BAP	Won
21	Chittorgarh	26 April 2024	Udai Lal Anjana	INC	Lost
21	Chittorgarh	26 April 2024	Mangilal Ninama	BAP	Lost
22	Rajsamand	26 April 2024	Damodar Gurjar	INC	Lost
23	Bhilwara	26 April 2024	C. P. Joshi	INC	Lost
24	Kota	26 April 2024	Prahlad Gunjal	INC	Lost
25	Jhalawar–Baran	26 April 2024	Urmila Jain Bhaya	INC	Lost

Friendly Contest

== Sikkim ==
INC (1)

Constituency		Poll on	Candidate		Result
1	Sikkim	19 April 2024	Gopal Chettri	INC	Lost

== Tamil Nadu ==
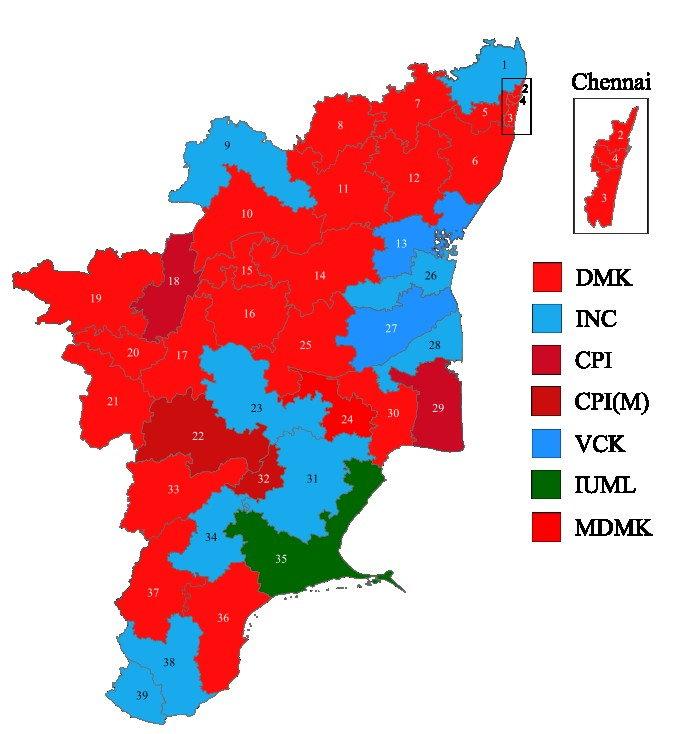

DMK (21)
INC (9)
CPI (2)
CPI(M) (2)
VCK (2)
IUML (1)
KMDK (1)
MDMK (1)

Constituency		Poll On	Candidate		Result
1	Thiruvallur (SC)	19 April 2024	Sasikanth Senthil	INC	Won
2	Chennai North	19 April 2024	Kalanidhi Veeraswamy	DMK	Won
3	Chennai South	19 April 2024	Thamizhachi Thangapandian	DMK	Won
4	Chennai Central	19 April 2024	Dayanidhi Maran	DMK	Won
5	Sriperumbudur	19 April 2024	T. R. Baalu	DMK	Won
6	Kancheepuram (SC)	19 April 2024	G. Selvam	DMK	Won
7	Arakkonam	19 April 2024	S. Jagathrakshakan	DMK	Won
8	Vellore	19 April 2024	D. M. Kathir Anand	DMK	Won
9	Krishnagiri	19 April 2024	K. Gopinath	INC	Won
10	Dharmapuri	19 April 2024	A. Mani	DMK	Won
11	Tiruvannamalai	19 April 2024	C. N. Annadurai	DMK	Won
12	Arani	19 April 2024	M. S. Tharanivendhan	DMK	Won
13	Villupuram (SC)	19 April 2024	D. Ravikumar	VCK	Won
14	Kallakurichi	19 April 2024	D. Malaiarasan	DMK	Won
15	Salem	19 April 2024	T. M. Selvaganapathi	DMK	Won
16	Namakkal	19 April 2024	V. S. Matheswaran	KMDK	Won
17	Erode	19 April 2024	K. E. Prakash	DMK	Won
18	Tiruppur	19 April 2024	K. Subbarayan	CPI	Won
19	Nilgiris (SC)	19 April 2024	A. Raja	DMK	Won
20	Coimbatore	19 April 2024	Ganapathi Raj Kumar	DMK	Won
21	Pollachi	19 April 2024	K. Eswarasamy	DMK	Won
22	Dindigul	19 April 2024	R. Sachithanantham	CPI(M)	Won
23	Karur	19 April 2024	Jothimani	INC	Won
24	Tiruchirappalli	19 April 2024	Durai Vaiyapuri	MDMK	Won
25	Perambalur	19 April 2024	K. N. Arun Nehru	DMK	Won
26	Cuddalore	19 April 2024	M. K. Vishnu Prasad	INC	Won
27	Chidambaram (SC)	19 April 2024	Thol. Thirumavalavan	VCK	Won
28	Mayiladuthurai	19 April 2024	Sudha Ramakrishnan	INC	Won
29	Nagapattinam (SC)	19 April 2024	V. Selvaraj	CPI	Won
30	Thanjavur	19 April 2024	S. Murasoli	DMK	Won
31	Sivaganga	19 April 2024	Karti Chidambaram	INC	Won
32	Madurai	19 April 2024	S. Venkatesan	CPI(M)	Won
33	Theni	19 April 2024	Thanga Tamil Selvan	DMK	Won
34	Virudhunagar	19 April 2024	Manickam Tagore	INC	Won
35	Ramanathapuram	19 April 2024	Kani K. Navas	IUML	Won
36	Thoothukudi	19 April 2024	Kanimozhi	DMK	Won
37	Tenkasi (SC)	19 April 2024	Rani Srikumar	DMK	Won
38	Tirunelveli	19 April 2024	C. Robert Bruce	INC	Won
39	Kanyakumari	19 April 2024	Vijay Vasanth	INC	Won

== Telangana ==
INC (17)
VCK (7)
AIFB (3)
CPI(M) (1)
RSP (1)

Constituency		Poll on	Candidate			Result		
Constituency		Poll on	1	Adilabad (ST)	13 May 2024	Atram Suguna	INC	Lost
2	Peddapalli (SC)	Vamsi Krishna Gaddam		INC	13 May 2024	Won		
3	Karimnagar	Velichala Rajender Rao		INC	13 May 2024	Lost		
4	Nizamabad	T. Jeevan Reddy		INC	13 May 2024	Lost		
5	Zahirabad	Suresh Shetkar		INC	13 May 2024	Won		
5	Zahirabad	Gurrapu Machandar		AIFB	13 May 2024	Lost		
6	Medak	Neelam Madhu		INC	13 May 2024	Lost		
6	Medak	Urelli Yellaiah		VCK	13 May 2024	Lost		
7	Malkajgiri	Patnam Sunitha Mahender Reddy		INC	13 May 2024	Lost		
8	Secunderabad	Danam Nagender		INC	13 May 2024	Lost		
8	Secunderabad	Pagidipalli Shyamson		VCK	13 May 2024	Lost		
9	Hyderabad	Mohammed Waliullah Sameer		INC	13 May 2024	Lost		
9	Hyderabad	J. Padmaja		VCK	13 May 2024	Lost		
10	Chevella	G. Ranjith Reddy		INC	13 May 2024	Lost		
10	Chevella	Konda Vishveshwar Reddy		AIFB	13 May 2024	Lost		
10	Chevella	Ranjit Reddy Gade		RSP	13 May 2024	Lost		
11	Mahbubnagar	Challa Vamshi Chand Reddy		INC	13 May 2024	Lost		
11	Mahbubnagar	Kadinti Shankar Reddy		VCK	13 May 2024	Lost		
12	Nagarkurnool (SC)	Mallu Ravi		INC	13 May 2024	Won		
12	Nagarkurnool (SC)	Dasari Bharathi		VCK	13 May 2024	Lost		
13	Nalgonda	Kunduru Raghuveer		INC	13 May 2024	Won		
14	Bhongir	Chamala Kiran Kumar Reddy		INC	13 May 2024	Won		
14	Bhongir	Md. Jahangir		CPI(M)	13 May 2024	Lost		
14	Bhongir	Erra Suryam		VCK	13 May 2024	Lost		
15	Warangal (SC)	Kadiyam Kavya		INC	13 May 2024	Won		
15	Warangal (SC)	Macha Devender		VCK	13 May 2024	Lost		
16	Mahabubabad (ST)	Balram Naik		INC	13 May 2024	Won		
16	Mahabubabad (ST)	Arun Kumar Mypathi		AIFB	13 May 2024	Lost		
17	Khammam	Ramasahayam Raghuram Reddy		INC	13 May 2024	Won		

Friendly Contest
Friendly Contest

== Tripura ==
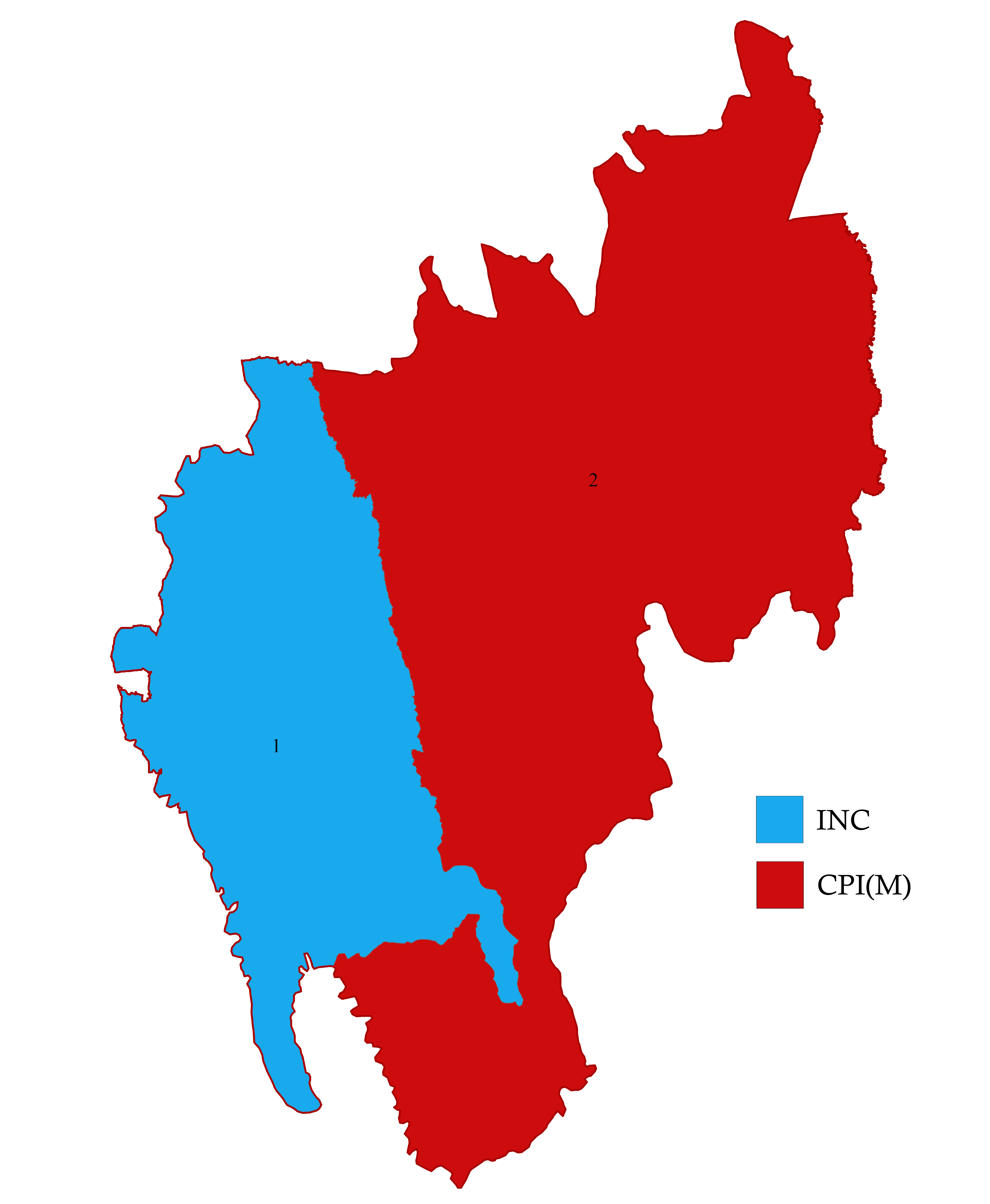

INC (1)
CPI(M) (1)

Constituency		Poll On	Candidate		Result
1	Tripura West	19 April 2024	Ashish Kumar Saha	INC	Lost
2	Tripura East (ST)	26 April 2024	Rajendra Reang	CPI(M)	Lost

== Uttar Pradesh ==
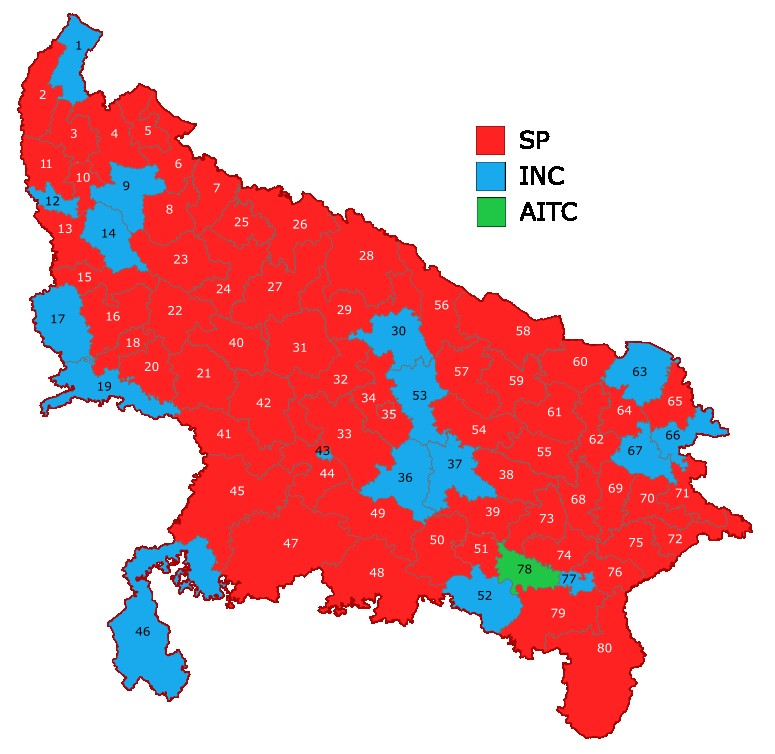

- INDIA Seat-sharing

SP (62)
INC (17)
AITC (1)

- Others Parties of INDIA

CPI (6)
AIFB (5)

Constituency		Poll On	Candidate		Result
1	Saharanpur	19 April 2024	Imran Masood	INC	Won
2	Kairana	19 April 2024	Iqra Hasan	SP	Won
3	Muzaffarnagar	19 April 2024	Harendra Singh Malik	SP	Won
4	Bijnor	19 April 2024	Deepak Saini	SP	Lost
5	Nagina (SC)	19 April 2024	Manoj Kumar	SP	Lost
6	Moradabad	19 April 2024	Ruchi Veera	SP	Won
7	Rampur	19 April 2024	Mohibullah Nadvi	SP	Won
8	Sambhal	7 May 2024	Zia ur Rahman Barq	SP	Won
9	Amroha	26 April 2024	Kunwar Danish Ali	INC	Lost
10	Meerut	26 April 2024	Sunita Verma	SP	Lost
11	Baghpat	26 April 2024	Manoj Chaudhary	SP	Lost
12	Ghaziabad	26 April 2024	Dolly Sharma	INC	Lost
13	Gautam Buddh Nagar	26 April 2024	Mahendra Singh Nagar	SP	Lost
14	Bulandshahr (SC)	26 April 2024	Shivram Valmiki	INC	Lost
15	Aligarh	26 April 2024	Bijendra Singh	SP	Lost
16	Hathras (SC)	7 May 2024	Jasvir Valmiki	SP	Lost
17	Mathura	26 April 2024	Mukesh Dhangar	INC	Lost
18	Agra (SC)	7 May 2024	Suresh Chand Kadam	SP	Lost
19	Fatehpur Sikri	7 May 2024	Ram Nath Sikarwar	INC	Lost
20	Firozabad	7 May 2024	Akshay Yadav	SP	Won
21	Mainpuri	7 May 2024	Dimple Yadav	SP	Won
22	Etah	7 May 2024	Devesh Shakya	SP	Won
23	Badaun	7 May 2024	Aaditya Yadav	SP	Won
24	Aonla	7 May 2024	Neeraj Maurya	SP	Won
25	Bareilly	7 May 2024	Praveen Singh Aron	SP	Lost
26	Pilibhit	19 April 2024	Bhagwat Saran Gangwar	SP	Lost
27	Shahjahanpur (SC)	13 May 2024	Jyotsna Gond	SP	Lost
28	Kheri	13 May 2024	Utkarsh Verma	SP	Won
29	Dhaurahra	13 May 2024	Anand Bhadauriya	SP	Won
29	Dhaurahra	13 May 2024	Janardan Prasad	CPI	Lost
30	Sitapur	13 May 2024	Rakesh Rathore	INC	Won
31	Hardoi (SC)	13 May 2024	Usha Verma	SP	Lost
32	Misrikh (SC)	13 May 2024	Ram Pal Rajwanshi	SP	Lost
33	Unnao	13 May 2024	Annu Tandon	SP	Lost
34	Mohanlalganj (SC)	20 May 2024	R. K. Chaudhary	SP	Won
35	Lucknow	20 May 2024	Ravidas Mehrotra	SP	Lost
36	Rae Bareli	20 May 2024	Rahul Gandhi	INC	Won
37	Amethi	20 May 2024	Kishori Lal Sharma	INC	Won
38	Sultanpur	25 May 2024	Ram Bhuaal Nishad	SP	Won
39	Pratapgarh	25 May 2024	S. P. Singh Patel	SP	Won
40	Farrukhabad	13 May 2024	Naval Kishore Shakya	SP	Lost
41	Etawah (SC)	13 May 2024	Jitendra Dohre	SP	Won
42	Kannauj	13 May 2024	Akhilesh Yadav	SP	Won
42	Kannauj	13 May 2024	Subhash Chandra	AIFB	Lost
43	Kanpur	13 May 2024	Alok Mishra	INC	Lost
43	Kanpur	13 May 2024	Prashast Dheer	AIFB	Lost
44	Akbarpur	13 May 2024	Raja Ram Pal	SP	Lost
45	Jalaun (SC)	20 May 2024	Narayan Das Ahirwar	SP	Won
46	Jhansi	20 May 2024	Pradeep Jain Aditya	INC	Lost
47	Hamirpur	20 May 2024	Ajendera Singh Rajput	SP	Won
48	Banda	20 May 2024	Shivshankar Singh Patel	SP	Won
48	Banda	20 May 2024	Ramchandra Saras	CPI	Lost
49	Fatehpur	20 May 2024	Naresh Uttam Patel	SP	Won
50	Kaushambi (SC)	20 May 2024	Pushpendra Saroj	SP	Won
51	Phulpur	25 May 2024	Amarnath Maurya	SP	Lost
52	Allahabad	25 May 2024	Ujjwal Rewati Raman Singh	INC	Won
53	Barabanki (SC)	20 May 2024	Tanuj Punia	INC	Won
54	Faizabad	20 May 2024	Awadhesh Prasad	SP	Won
54	Faizabad	20 May 2024	Arvind Sen	CPI	Lost
55	Ambedkar Nagar	25 May 2024	Lalji Verma	SP	Won
56	Bahraich (SC)	13 May 2024	Ramesh Gautam	SP	Lost
57	Kaiserganj	20 May 2024	Bhagat Ram Mishra	SP	Lost
58	Shravasti	25 May 2024	Ram Shiromani Verma	SP	Won
59	Gonda	20 May 2024	Shreya Verma	SP	Lost
60	Domariyaganj	25 May 2024	Bhishma Shankar Tiwari	SP	Lost
61	Basti	25 May 2024	Ram Prasad Chaudhary	SP	Won
61	Basti	25 May 2024	Hafiz Ali	AIFB	Lost
62	Sant Kabir Nagar	25 May 2024	Laxmikant alias Pappu Nishad	SP	Won
63	Maharajganj	1 June 2024	Virendra Chaudhary	INC	Lost
64	Gorakhpur	1 June 2024	Kajal Nishad	SP	Lost
65	Kushi Nagar	1 June 2024	Ajay Pratap Singh	SP	Lost
66	Deoria	1 June 2024	Akhilesh Pratap Singh	INC	Lost
67	Bansgaon (SC)	1 June 2024	Sadal Prasad	INC	Lost
68	Lalganj (SC)	25 May 2024	Daroga Prasad Saroj	SP	Won
68	Lalganj (SC)	25 May 2024	Ganga Deen	CPI	Lost
69	Azamgarh	25 May 2024	Dharmendra Yadav	SP	Won
70	Ghosi	1 June 2024	Rajiv Rai	SP	Won
70	Ghosi	1 June 2024	Vinod Rai	CPI	Lost
71	Salempur	1 June 2024	Ramshankar Rajbhar	SP	Won
72	Ballia	1 June 2024	Sanatan Pandey	SP	Won
73	Jaunpur	25 May 2024	Babu Singh Kushwaha	SP	Won
74	Machhlishahr (SC)	25 May 2024	Priya Saroj	SP	Won
75	Ghazipur	1 June 2024	Afzal Ansari	SP	Won
76	Chandauli	1 June 2024	Birendra Singh	SP	Won
77	Varanasi	1 June 2024	Ajay Rai	INC	Lost
78	Bhadohi	25 May 2024	Lalitesh Pati Tripathi	AITC	Lost
78	Bhadohi	25 May 2024	Laliteshpati Tripathi	AIFB	Lost
79	Mirzapur	1 June 2024	Ramesh Chand Bind	SP	Lost
79	Mirzapur	1 June 2024	Sameer Singh	AIFB	Lost
80	Robertsganj (SC)	1 June 2024	Chhotelal Kharwar	SP	Won
80	Robertsganj (SC)	1 June 2024	Ashok Kumar Kannaujiya	CPI	Lost

Friendly Contest

== Uttarakhand ==
INC (5)

Constituency		Poll On	Candidate		Result
1	Tehri Garhwal	19 April 2024	Jot Singh Gunsola	INC	Lost
2	Garhwal	19 April 2024	Ganesh Godiyal	INC	Lost
3	Almora (SC)	19 April 2024	Pradeep Tamta	INC	Lost
4	Nainital–Udhamsingh Nagar	19 April 2024	Prakash Joshi	INC	Lost
5	Haridwar	19 April 2024	Virendra Rawat	INC	Lost

== West Bengal ==
The ruling TMC and the opposition SDA contested separately in West Bengal.

AITC (42)

- SDA Seat-sharing

CPI(M) (23)
INC (12) (Note: Congress and Forward Bloc had friendly contests on Cooch Behar and Purulia constituencies.)
RSP (3)
AIFB (2)
CPI (2)

- Other Parties of INDIA

AIFB (1)
CPI(ML)L (1)
INC (1)

#	Constituency	Poll On	All India Trinamool Congress			Secular Democratic Alliance		
#	Constituency	Poll On	Candidate	Party	Result	Candidate	Party	Result
1	Cooch Behar (SC)	19 April 2024	Jagadish Chandra Basunia	AITC	Won	Piya Roy Chowdhury	INC	Lost
1	Cooch Behar (SC)	19 April 2024	Jagadish Chandra Basunia	AITC	Won	Nitish Chandra Roy	AIFB	Lost
2	Alipurduars (ST)	19 April 2024	Prakash Chik Baraik	AITC	Lost	Mili Oraon	RSP	Lost
3	Jalpaiguri (SC)	19 April 2024	Nirmal Chandra Roy	AITC	Lost	Debraj Burman	CPI(M)	Lost
4	Darjeeling	26 April 2024	Gopal Lama	AITC	Lost	Munish Tamang	INC	Lost
5	Raiganj	26 April 2024	Krishna Kalyani	AITC	Lost	Ali Ramz (Victor)	INC	Lost
6	Balurghat	26 April 2024	Biplab Mitra	AITC	Lost	Jaydeb Siddhanta	RSP	Lost
7	Maldaha Uttar	7 May 2024	Prasun Banerjee	AITC	Lost	Mostaque Alam	INC	Lost
8	Maldaha Dakshin	7 May 2024	Sahnawaz Ali Raihan	AITC	Lost	Isha Khan Choudhury	INC	Won
9	Jangipur	7 May 2024	Khalilur Rahaman	AITC	Won	Mortaza Hossain	INC	Lost
10	Baharampur	13 May 2024	Yusuf Pathan	AITC	Won	Adhir Ranjan Chowdhury	INC	Lost
11	Murshidabad	7 May 2024	Abu Taher Khan	AITC	Won	Mohammad Salim	CPI(M)	Lost
12	Krishnanagar	13 May 2024	Mahua Moitra	AITC	Won	S. M. Saadi	CPI(M)	Lost
13	Ranaghat (SC)	13 May 2024	Mukut Mani Adhikari	AITC	Lost	Alokesh Das	CPI(M)	Lost
14	Bangaon (SC)	20 May 2024	Biswajit Das	AITC	Lost	Pradip Biswas	INC	Lost
15	Barrackpur	20 May 2024	Partha Bhowmick	AITC	Won	Debdut Ghosh	CPI(M)	Lost
16	Dum Dum	1 June 2024	Saugata Roy	AITC	Won	Sujan Chakraborty	CPI(M)	Lost
17	Barasat	1 June 2024	Kakoli Ghosh Dastidar	AITC	Won	Sanjib Chatterjee	AIFB	Lost
18	Basirhat	1 June 2024	Haji Nurul Islam	AITC	Won	Nirapada Sardar	CPI(M)	Lost
19	Jaynagar (SC)	1 June 2024	Pratima Mondal	AITC	Won	Samarendra Nath Mandal	RSP	Lost
20	Mathurapur (SC)	1 June 2024	Bapi Haldar	AITC	Won	Sarat Chandra Haldar	CPI(M)	Lost
21	Diamond Harbour	1 June 2024	Abhishek Banerjee	AITC	Won	Pratik Ur Rahaman	CPI(M)	Lost
22	Jadavpur	1 June 2024	Sayani Ghosh	AITC	Won	Srijan Bhattacharyya	CPI(M)	Lost
23	Kolkata Dakshin	1 June 2024	Mala Roy	AITC	Won	Saira Shah Halim	CPI(M)	Lost
24	Kolkata Uttar	1 June 2024	Sudip Bandopadhyay	AITC	Won	Pradip Bhattacharya	INC	Lost
25	Howrah	20 May 2024	Prasun Banerjee	AITC	Won	Sabyasachi Chatterjee	CPI(M)	Lost
26	Uluberia	20 May 2024	Sajda Ahmed	AITC	Won	Azhar Mullick	INC	Lost
27	Sreerampur	20 May 2024	Kalyan Banerjee	AITC	Won	Dipsita Dhar	CPI(M)	Lost
28	Hooghly	20 May 2024	Rachana Banerjee	AITC	Won	Monodip Ghosh	CPI(M)	Lost
29	Arambag (SC)	20 May 2024	Mitali Bag	AITC	Won	Biplab Kumar Moitra	CPI(M)	Lost
30	Tamluk	25 May 2024	Debangshu Bhattacharya	AITC	Lost	Sayan Banerjee	CPI(M)	Lost
31	Kanthi	25 May 2024	Uttam Barik	AITC	Lost	Urbashi Bhattacharya	INC	Lost
32	Ghatal	25 May 2024	Deepak Adhikari	AITC	Won	Tapan Ganguly	CPI	Lost
33	Jhargram (ST)	25 May 2024	Kherwal Soren	AITC	Won	Sonamoni Murmu (Tudu)	CPI(M)	Lost
34	Medinipur	25 May 2024	June Malia	AITC	Won	Biplab Bhatta	CPI	Lost
35	Purulia	25 May 2024	Santiram Mahato	AITC	Lost	Nepal Mahato	INC	Lost
35	Purulia	25 May 2024	Santiram Mahato	AITC	Lost	Dhirendra Nath Mahato	AIFB	Lost
36	Bankura	25 May 2024	Arup Chakraborty	AITC	Won	Nilanjan Dasgupta	CPI(M)	Lost
37	Bishnupur (SC)	25 May 2024	Sujata Mondal	AITC	Lost	Shital Kaibartya	CPI(M)	Lost
38	Bardhaman Purba (SC)	13 May 2024	Sharmila Sarkar	AITC	Won	Nirav Khan	CPI(M)	Lost
38	Bardhaman Purba (SC)	13 May 2024	Sharmila Sarkar	AITC	Won	Sajal Kumar De	CPI(ML)L	Lost
39	Bardhaman–Durgapur	13 May 2024	Kirti Azad	AITC	Won	Sukriti Ghosal	CPI(M)	Lost
40	Asansol	13 May 2024	Shatrughan Sinha	AITC	Won	Jahanara Khan	CPI(M)	Lost
41	Bolpur (SC)	13 May 2024	Asit Mal	AITC	Won	Shyamali Pradhan	CPI(M)	Lost
42	Birbhum	13 May 2024	Satabdi Roy	AITC	Won	Milton Rashid	INC	Lost

Friendly Contest

== See also ==
- List of National Democratic Alliance candidates in the 2024 Indian general election
- List of Left Front candidates in the 2024 Indian general election
- List of Left Democratic Front candidates in the 2024 Indian general election
- Indian National Congress campaign for the 2024 Indian general election
