= Chorasi Assembly constituency =

Legislative Assembly constituency in Rajasthan State, India

Coordinates: 26.06°N 74.43°E

Chorasi
- Constituency No. 161 for the Rajasthan Legislative Assembly

Constituency details
- Country: India
- Region: North India
- State: Rajasthan
- District: Dungarpur
- Established: 1972
- Reservation: ST

Member of Legislative Assembly
- 16th Rajasthan Legislative Assembly
- Incumbent Anil Kumar Katara
- Party: BAP
- Alliance: INDIA
- Elected year: 2024

Chorasi Assembly constituency is one of the 200 Legislative Assembly constituencies of Rajasthan state in India. Chorasi is part of Dungarpur district.

== Member of the Legislative Assembly ==
Election	Name	Party
2008	Shankar Lal Ahari	Indian National Congress
2013	Sushil Katara	Bharatiya Janata Party
2018	Rajkumar Roat	Bharatiya Tribal Party
2023	Rajkumar Roat	Bharat Adivasi Party
2024^	Anil Kumar Katara	Bharat Adivasi Party

== Election results ==
=== 2024 bypoll ===
Rajasthan Legislative Assembly by-election, 2024: Chorasi
Party	Candidate	Votes	%	±%
BAP	Anil Kumar Katara	89,161	46.89	−7.01
BJP	Karilal Nanoma	64,791	34.08	+13.68
INC	Mahesh Roat	15,915	8.37	−5.23
IND	Anil Kumar Katara	6,652	3.50	
NOTA	None of the above	3,144	1.65	+0.85
Majority		24,370	12.81	−21.39
Turnout		190,134		
BAP hold		Swing		

=== 2023 ===
2023 Rajasthan Legislative Assembly election: Chorasi
Party	Candidate	Votes	%	±%
BAP	Rajkumar Roat	111,150	53.92	
BJP	Sushil Katara	41,984	20.37	▼10.14
INC	Tarachand Bhagora	28,120	13.64	▼7.77
Independent	Mahendra Barjod	11,314	5.49	
BTP	Ranchhodlal Tabiyad	3,318	1.61	▼36.61
Indian Peoples Green Party	Shankarlal Bamaniya	1,969	0.96	
AAP	Shankarlal	1,914	0.93	
NOTA	None of the above	3,795	1.84	▼0.96
Majority		69,166	33.55	▲25.84
Turnout		206,140	82.4	▲4.56
BAP gain from BTP		Swing		

=== 2018 ===
2018 Rajasthan Legislative Assembly election: Chorasi
Party	Candidate	Votes	%	±%
BTP	Rajkumar Roat	64,119	38.22	
BJP	Sushil Katara	51,185	30.51	
INC	Manjula Devi Roat	35,915	21.41	
Independent	Jayprakash Roat	2,314	1.38	
BMP	Kanhaiyalal Kalasua	2,180	1.3	
BSP	Vijayapal Roat	2,047	1.22	
Naya Bharat Party	Nitesh Parmar	1,800	1.07	
Independent	Kantilal Bhamat	1,796	1.07	
Independent	Laxman Damor	1,733	1.03	
NOTA	None of the above	4,692	2.8	
Majority		12,934	7.71	
Turnout		167,781	77.84	
BTP gain from BJP		Swing		
