= Anil Kumar Katara =

Indian politician

Member of Rajasthan Legislative Assembly
- Incumbent
- Assumed office 23 November 2024
- Preceded by: Rajkumar Roat
- Constituency: Chorasi

Personal details
- Party: Bharat Adivasi Party
- Profession: Politician

Anil Kumar Katara is an Indian politician from Rajasthan. He is a member of the Rajasthan Legislative Assembly since 2024, representing Chorasi Assembly constituency as a member of the Bharat Adivasi Party.

== See also ==
- Rajasthan Legislative Assembly
