= Rajkumar Roat =

Indian politician

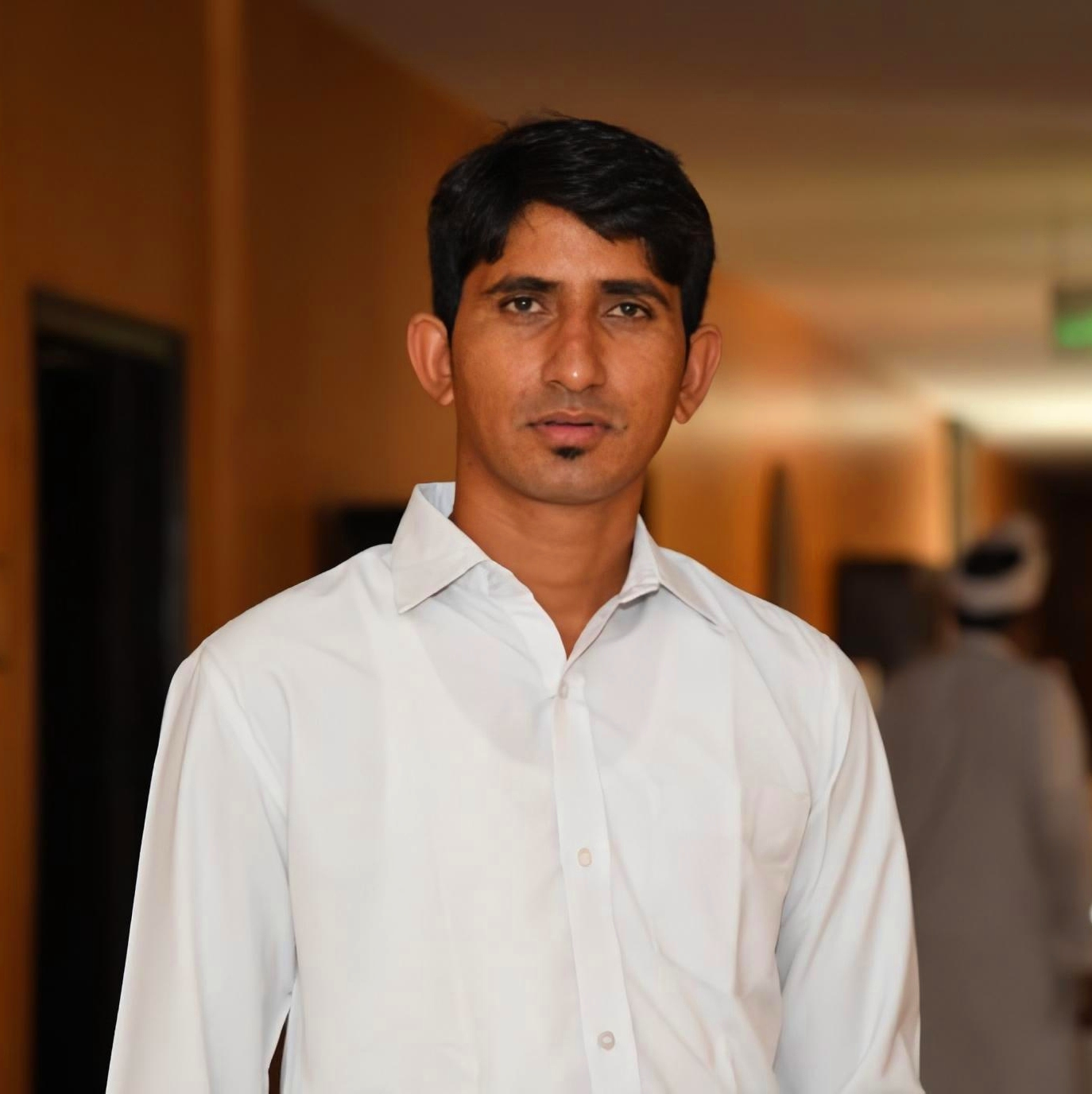
- Rajkumar Roat in 2021

Member of Parliament, Lok Sabha
- Incumbent
- Assumed office 4 June 2024
- Preceded by: Kanak Mal Katara
- Constituency: Banswara

Member of Rajasthan Legislative Assembly
- In office 13 December 2018 – 4 June 2024
- Preceded by: Sushil Katara
- Succeeded by: Anil Kumar Katara
- Constituency: Chorasi

Personal details
- Born: 26 June 1992 (age 34) Dungarpur, Rajasthan, India
- Party: Bharat Adivasi Party (2023–present)
- Other political affiliations: Bharatiya Tribal Party (2018–2023)
- Spouse: Geeta (m. 2021)
- Children: 1
- Education: Mohanlal Sukhadia University (BA); University of Rajasthan (B.Ed)
- Occupation: Politician
- Website: rajkumarroat.in

Rajkumar Roat (born 26 June 1992; Hindi pronunciation: [ɾaːd͡ʒ.kʊmaːɾ ɾoːt̪]) is an Indian politician who is serving as a member of the Lok Sabha from Banswara Constituency. He is a two-time MLA from the Chorasi constituency. He is the founder and a member of the Bharat Adivasi Party (BAP).

== Early life and education ==
Rajkumar Roat was born on 26 June 1992 in Dungarpur, Rajasthan and belongs to Adivasi Bhil tribal community. He completed his Bachelor of Arts (B.A.) degree from Mohanlal Sukhadia University. He then pursued a Bachelor of Education (B.Ed.) from the University of Rajasthan.

== Political career ==
Roat was elected as the youngest MLA in the 2018 Rajasthan Legislative Assembly election. He contested the election from the Chorasi constituency for BTP party. He has held several roles within the Rajasthan Legislative Assembly, contributing to the governance and legislative processes of the state.

In the 16th Rajasthan Assembly, Roat secured his position as a member after being elected in 2023. He has been appointed to two committees in 2024. Firstly, he is now a member of the Home Committee, focusing on matters related to law enforcement and public safety. Additionally, he also holds a role in the Business Advisory Committee.

Prior to this, in the 15th Rajasthan Assembly, Roat served from 2018 to 2023. During this time, From 2021 to 2022, he was a member of the Committee on Local Bodies and Panchayati Raj Institutions. Additionally, from 2019 to 2022, he served on the Committee on Welfare of Scheduled Tribes also.

In the 2024 general election, Roat was elected as a Member of Parliament for the Banswara Lok Sabha constituency, defeating Mahendrajeet Singh Malviya by a margin of 2,47,054 votes.

| Year | Position |
|---|---|
| 2024-29 | Elected to the 18th Lok Sabha: Member of the Committee of Social Justice & Empowerment 2024 |
| 2023-24 | Elected to the 16th Rajasthan Assembly: Member of Committee of Home 2024; Member of Committee of Business Advisory 2024 |
| 2018-23 | Elected to the 15th Rajasthan Assembly: Member of Committee on Local Bodies and Panchayati Raj Institutions 2021-22; Member of Committee on Welfare of Schedule Tribe 2019-2022 |

== Controversies ==
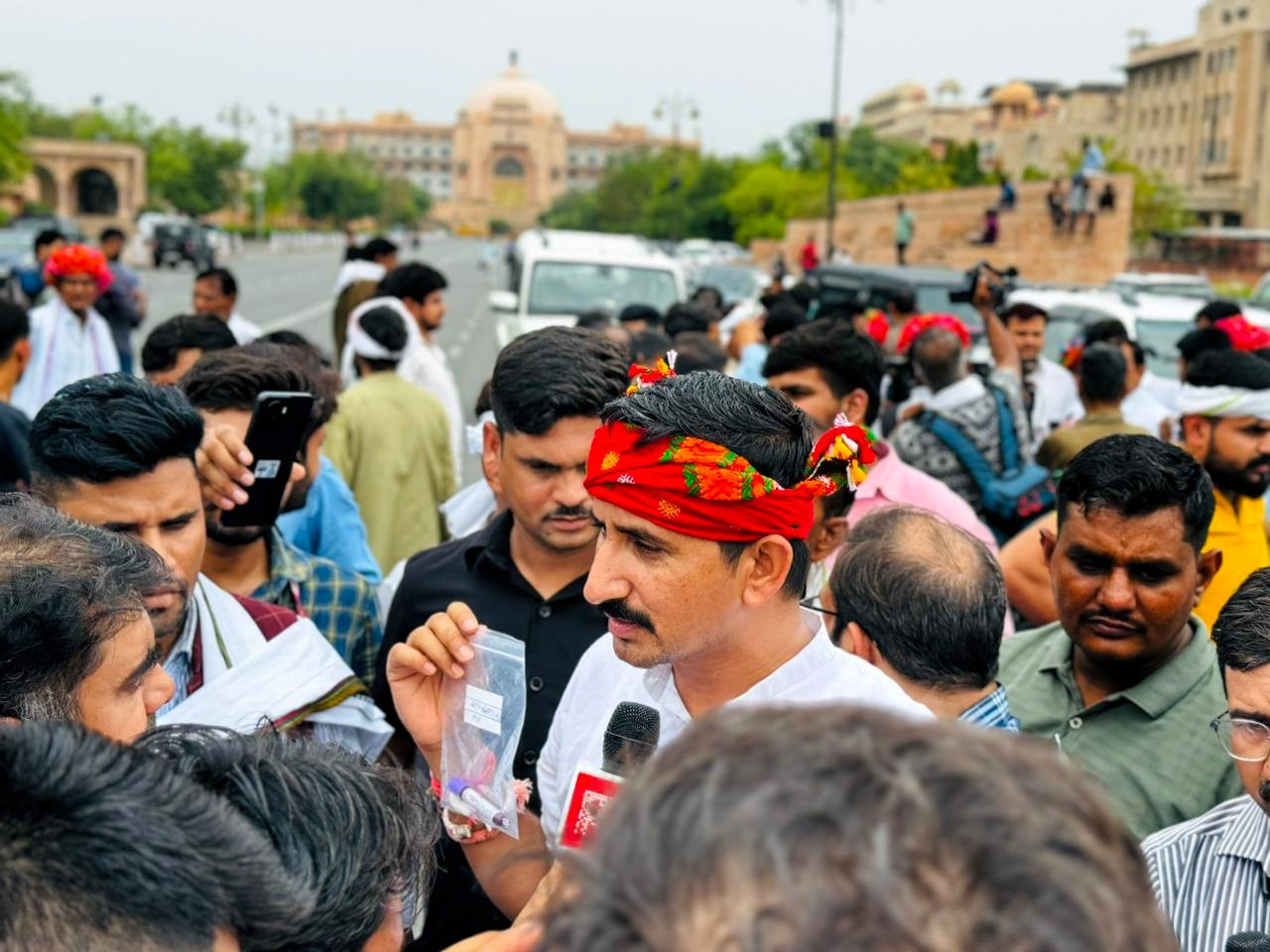
Rajkumar Roat giving his blood sample at Amar Jawan Jyoti, Jaipur

In 2024, Rajasthan's BJP Education Minister Madan Dilawar made a controversial statement regarding the tribal community, suggesting that their blood should be tested, and DNA checked to determine their parentage. In response, Rajkumar Roat launched a campaign to collect DNA samples from households across the state to send to Minister Dilawar. As part of this campaign, Roat personally submitted his blood sample at the Amar Jawan Jyoti's site in Jaipur.

== DISHA Committee ==
In December 2025, Rajkumar Roat was involved in a tense discussion during a DISHA meeting in Dungarpur while raising issues related to development work and tribal areas. According to reports, the meeting escalated into a loud argument and Rajkumar Roat accused Mannalal Rawat of disrupting the session and not wanting development in tribal areas. One report noted that during the debate, Mannalal Rawat made an aggressive motion with a slipper toward Roat, which Rajkumar Roat later described as provocative and unbecoming in an official meeting. Roat subsequently stated that disagreements in such public forums should be addressed with proper decorum and respect, and that his intention was to bring attention to issues faced by constituents.
