= Bharat Adivasi Party =

Indian political party in Rajasthan

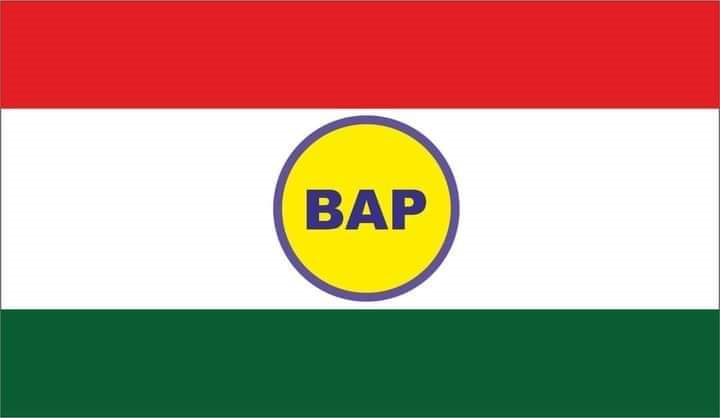
- Abbreviation: BAP (बीएपी)
- President: Mohan Lal Roat
- Founder: Rajkumar Roat
- Founded: 10 September 2023
- Split from: Bharatiya Tribal Party
- Headquarters: Dungarpur, Rajasthan
- Ideology: Bhil Pradesh statehood Regionalism
- Colours: Red
- ECI Status: State party
- Alliance: INDIA (2023–present)
- Seats in Lok Sabha: 1 / 543
- Seats in Rajasthan Legislative Assembly: 4 / 200
- Seats in Madhya Pradesh Legislative Assembly: 1 / 230

Election symbol
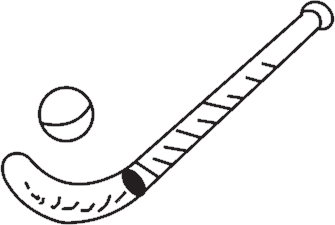

Website
- bharatadivasiparty.org

The Bharat Adivasi Party (BAP; lit. 'Indian Adivasi Party') is a political party based in Rajasthan, India. The party was formed by Rajkumar Roat on 10 September 2023.

The Bharat Adivasi Party won three seats in the 2023 Rajasthan Legislative Assembly election and one seat in the 2023 Madhya Pradesh Legislative Assembly election. Party leader Roat won Chorasi Assembly constituency (Rajasthan) with a margin of more than 69,000 votes.

== List of MPs ==
=== Members of Parliament, Lok Sabha ===
S.No	Election Year	Portrait	MP	Constituency	Lok Sabha	Margin
1.	2024		Rajkumar Roat	Banswara	18th Lok Sabha	2,47,054

== List of MLAs ==
S.No	Election Year	Portrait	MLAs	Constituency	Margin
Rajasthan Legislative Assembly
1.	2023		Rajkumar Roat	Chorasi	69,166
2.	2023		Umesh Meena	Aspur	28,086
3.	2023		Thavar Chand Meena	Dhariawad	6,691
4.	2024^		Anil Kumar Katara	Chorasi	24,370
5.	2024^		Jaikrishn Patel	Bagidora	51,434
Madhya Pradesh Legislative Assembly
6.	2023		Kamleshwar Dodiyar	Sailana	4,618

^by-election

== Election Symbols ==
The party was formed in September 2023, Just before the legislative Assembly elections of Rajasthan and Madhya Pradesh. In 2023 Rajasthan election the eci allotted Hockey Bat and Ball, and won 4 seats also the Madhya Pradesh legislative election were simultaneously occurred with Rajasthan. In MP, the party contested in Auto Rickshaw symbol and As a result, the party able to gain one seat in Madhya Pradesh assembly. In 2024 Indian general election the party was allied with I.N.D.I.A Alliance. And Contested one Seat in Hockey Bat and Ball Symbol by the founder Rajkumar Roat in Banswara and he successfully won the election. And In 2025, the eci recognizes BAP as State Party in Rajasthan.

== Electoral performance ==
=== General election ===
Election Year	Lok Sabha	Seats contested	Seats won	+/- seats	Overall Votes	Percentage of votes
2024	18th Lok Sabha	1	1	▲1	1,257,056	

=== Legislative Assembly election ===
Election Year	Seats contested	Seats won	+/- seats	Overall Votes	Percentage of votes
Rajasthan
2023	27	3	▲3	929,969	2.33
Madhya Pradesh
2023	8	1	▲1		
Jharkhand
2024		0	Steady		

== See also ==
- 2023 Madhya Pradesh Legislative Assembly election
- 2023 Rajasthan Legislative Assembly election
- Elections in India
- List of political parties in India
