= Banswara Lok Sabha constituency =

Lok Sabha Constituency in Rajasthan

Coordinates: 23.55°N 74.44°E

Banswara
- Lok Sabha constituency
- Interactive Map Outlining Banswara Lok Sabha Constituency

Constituency details
- Country: India
- Region: North India
- State: Rajasthan
- Assembly constituencies: Dungarpur; Sagwara; Chorasi; Ghatol; Garhi; Banswara; Bagidora; Kushalgarh
- Established: 1952
- Reservation: ST

Member of Parliament
- 18th Lok Sabha
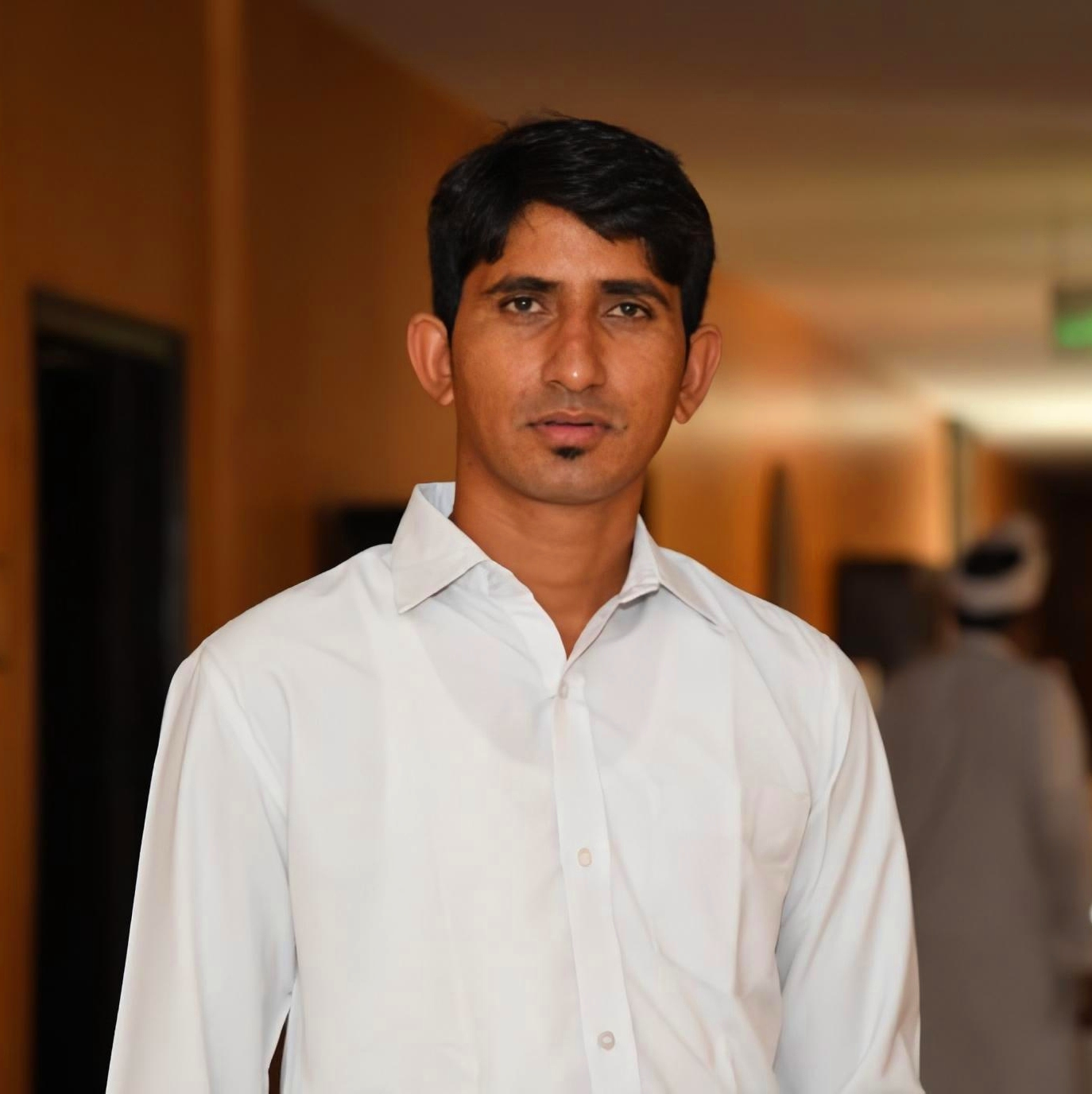
- Incumbent Rajkumar Roat
- Party: BAP
- Alliance: INDIA
- Elected year: 2024
- Preceded by: Kanak Mal Katara

Banswara Lok Sabha constituency (Hindi pronunciation: [bãːs.ʋaːɽaː]) is one of the 25 Lok Sabha (parliamentary) constituencies in Rajasthan state in western India.

== Assembly segments ==
Presently, Banswara Lok Sabha constituency comprises eight Vidhan Sabha (legislative assembly) segments. These are:

| # | Name | District | Member | Party | 2024 Lead |
|---|---|---|---|---|---|
| 158 | Dungarpur (ST) | Dungarpur | Ganesh Ghogra | INC | BAP |
| 160 | Sagwara (ST) | Dungarpur | Shankarlal Decha | BJP | BAP |
| 161 | Chorasi (ST) | Dungarpur | Anil Kumar Katara | BAP | BAP |
| 162 | Ghatol (ST) | Banswara | Nanalal Ninama | INC | BAP |
| 163 | Garhi (ST) | Banswara | Kailash Chandra Meena | BJP | BAP |
| 164 | Banswara (ST) | Banswara | Arjun Singh Bamaniya | INC | BJP |
| 165 | Bagidora (ST) | Banswara | Jaikrishn Patel | BAP | BAP |
| 166 | Kushalgarh (ST) | Banswara | Ramila Khadiya | INC | BAP |

== Members of Parliament ==
| Year | Member | Party |
|---|---|---|
| 1952 | Bheekha Bhai | Indian National Congress |
| 1957 | Bhogilal Pandya | Indian National Congress |
| 1962 | Ratan Lal | Indian National Congress |
| 1967 | Heerji Bhai | Indian National Congress |
| 1971 | Hira Lal Doda | Indian National Congress |
| 1977 | Heera Bhai | Janata Party |
| 1980 | Bheekha Bhai | Indian National Congress |
| 1984 | Prabhu Lal Rawat | Indian National Congress |
| 1989 | Heera Bhai | Janata Dal |
| 1991 | Prabhu Lal Rawat | Indian National Congress |
| 1996 | Tarachand Bhagora | Indian National Congress |
| 1998 | Mahendrajeet Singh Malviya | Indian National Congress |
| 1999 | Tarachand Bhagora | Indian National Congress |
| 2004 | Dhan Singh Rawat | Bharatiya Janata Party |
| 2009 | Tarachand Bhagora | Indian National Congress |
| 2014 | Manshankar Ninama | Bharatiya Janata Party |
| 2019 | Kanak Mal Katara | Bharatiya Janata Party |
| 2024 | Rajkumar Roat | Bharat Adivasi Party |

== Election results ==
=== 2024 ===
2024 Indian general election: Banswara
| Party | Candidate | Votes | % | ±% |
|---|---|---|---|---|
| BAP | Rajkumar Roat | 820,831 | 50.15 | New |
| BJP | Mahendrajeet Singh Malviya | 5,73,777 | 35.05 | ▼14.39 |
| Independent | Rajkumar | 74,598 | 4.56 | N/A |
| INC (Rebel) | Arvind Sita Damor | 61,211 | 3.74 | ▼24.48 |
| Independent | Rajkumar | 41,790 | 2.55 | N/A |
| NOTA | None of the above | 20,970 | 1.28 | ▼0.80 |
| Independent | Banshilal Ahari | 17,896 | 1.08 | N/A |
| IPGP | Shankarlal Bamaniya | 17,188 | 1.05 | N/A |
| BSP | Dileep Kumar Meena | 8,591 | 0.52 | ▼1.30 |
| Majority | | 2,47,054 | 15.09 | ▼6.13 |
| Turnout | | 16,36,852 | 74.39 | ▲1.49 |
| BAP gain from BJP | | Swing | | |

=== 2019 ===
2019 Indian general elections: Banswara
| Party | Candidate | Votes | % | ±% |
|---|---|---|---|---|
| BJP | Kanak Mal Katara | 711,709 | 49.44 | |
| INC | Tarachand Bhagora | 4,06,245 | 28.22 | |
| BTP | Kantilal Roat | 2,50,761 | 17.42 | |
| NOTA | None of the above | 29,962 | 2.08 | |
| BSP | Bapulal | 26,172 | 1.82 | |
| Majority | | 3,05,464 | 21.22 | |
| Turnout | | 14,40,109 | 72.90 | |
| BJP hold | | Swing | | |

=== 2014 ===
2014 Indian general elections: Banswara
| Party | Candidate | Votes | % | ±% |
|---|---|---|---|---|
| BJP | Manshankar Ninama | 577,433 | 49.30 | |
| INC | Resham Malviya | 4,85,517 | 41.46 | |
| NOTA | None of the above | 34,404 | 2.94 | |
| BSP | Vijay Pal | 27,886 | 2.38 | |
| Majority | | 91,916 | 7.85 | |
| Turnout | | 11,71,488 | 68.98 | |
| BJP gain from INC | | Swing | | |

=== 2009 ===
2009 Indian general elections: Banswara
| Party | Candidate | Votes | % | ±% |
|---|---|---|---|---|
| INC | Tarachand Bhagora | 413,169 | 53.67 | |
| BJP | Hakaru Maida | 2,13,751 | 27.76 | |
| JD(U) | Prabhulal Rawat | 71,543 | 9.29 | |
| Loktantrik Samajwadi | Prof Mohanlal Damor | 30,197 | 3.92 | |
| Majority | | 1,99,418 | 25.94 | |
| Turnout | | 7,69,712 | 52.79 | |
| INC gain from BJP | | Swing | | |

=== 2004 ===
2004 Indian general elections: Banswara
| Party | Candidate | Votes | % | ±% |
|---|---|---|---|---|
| BJP | Dhan Singh Rawat | 269,239 | 40.42 | ▲40.42 |
| INC | Prabhu Lal Rawat | 2,47,556 | 37.17 | −21.87 |
| JD | Jeetmal Khant | 78,556 | 11.79 | −29.17 |
| Independent | Suryalal Khant | 31,132 | 4.67 | +4.67 |
| BSP | Sunder Lal Parmar | 17,841 | 2.70 | |
| Independent | Nanuram Khant | 11,084 | 1.66 | |
| SP | Bahadur Singh | 10,688 | 1.60 | |
| Majority | | 21,683 | 3.25 | +62.29 |
| Turnout | | 6,66,098 | 48.51 | −7.11 |
| BJP hold | | Swing | +40.42 | |

== See also ==
- Banswara district
- List of constituencies of the Lok Sabha
