= Dhambola =

- village
- Location in Rajasthan, India Dhambola (India)
- Coordinates: 23°35′23″N 73°46′01″E
- Country: India
- State: Rajasthan
- District: Dungarpur
- Tehsil: Simalwara

Population (2011)
  - Total: 4,010

Languages
  - Official: Hindi
- Time zone: UTC+5:30 (IST)
- PIN: 314402

Dhambola is a panchayat village in Simalwara Tehsil of Dungarpur District, Rajasthan, India.

There are three villages in the Dhambola gram panchayat: Dhambola, Kesharpura, and Merop.

== Geography ==
Dhambola lies on the left bank of a tributary to the Vatrak River, just downstream from the Talab reservoir. The main highway through the village is State Highway 54 which runs north to the town of Dungarpur and south to the town of Simalwara.

== Demographics ==
In the 2011 census the village of Dhambola had 4,110 people forming 868 families. 16.6% of the population was below the age of six. The sex ratio for children in Dhambola as per the census was 0.866 females to 1 male, a likely indicator of female infanticide. The literacy rate in Dhambola was 69.00%, with the male rate being 77.89% and the female rate 59.87%. Agriculture occupied less than 10% of the village workers.

== Points of interest ==
- Khakhleshwar Mahadev Temple is a Hindu temple in Dhambola

2 maa tripura sundari mandir temple dhambola is situated in kovadiya fala dhambola. (hindu mandir)

== Website ==
http://www.dhambola.co.in
