= Kanak Mal Katara =

Indian politician

Member of Parliament, Lok Sabha
- In office 23 May 2019 - 4 June 2024
- Preceded by: Manshankar Ninama
- Succeeded by: Rajkumar Roat
- Constituency: Banswara

Cabinet Minister of Government of Rajasthan
- In office 2003 - 2008

Member of the Rajasthan Legislative Assembly
- In office 2003 - 2008

Member of Parliament for Rajasthan
- In office 1994 - 2000

Personal details
- Born: 4 May 1957 (age 68) Falater, Dungarpur, Rajasthan
- Party: Bharatiya Janata Party

Kanak Mal Katara is a former Member of Parliament from Banswara Lok Sabha constituency in Rajasthan. He is a former member of Rajya Sabha and former cabinet minister in Government of Rajasthan. He held the portfolios of Woman and Child Development, Tribal Area Development, and GAD and was elected to Rajasthan Legislative Assembly from Sagwara in Dungarpur district. He is a leader of Bharatiya Janata Party.
