= Jogindernagar Assembly constituency =

Legislative Assembly constituency in Himachal Pradesh State, India

Coordinates: 31.99°N 76.79°E

Jogindernagar
- Constituency No. 31 for the Himachal Pradesh Legislative Assembly

Constituency details
- Country: India
- Region: North India
- State: Himachal Pradesh
- District: Mandi
- Lok Sabha constituency: Mandi
- Established: 1951
- Total electors: 101,046
- Reservation: None

Member of Legislative Assembly
- 14th Himachal Pradesh Legislative Assembly
- Incumbent Prakash Rana
- Party: Independent
- Elected year: 2022

Jogindernagar Assembly constituency is one of the 68 constituencies in the Himachal Pradesh Legislative Assembly of Himachal Pradesh a northern state of India. Jogindernagar is also part of Mandi Lok Sabha constituency.

== Members of the Legislative Assembly ==
Year	Member	Picture	Party
1967	Gopi Ram		Indian National Congress
1972	Ram Singh		Indian National Congress
1977	Gulab Singh Thakur		Janata Party
1982	Gulab Singh Thakur		Independent
1985	Ratan Lal		Independent
1990	Gulab Singh Thakur		Indian National Congress
1993	Gulab Singh Thakur		Indian National Congress
1998	Gulab Singh Thakur		Indian National Congress
2003	Surender Pal		Indian National Congress
2007	Gulab Singh Thakur		Bharatiya Janata Party
2012	Gulab Singh Thakur		Bharatiya Janata Party
2017	Prakash Rana		Independent
2022	Prakash Rana		Bharatiya Janata Party

== Election results ==
=== Assembly Election 2022 ===
2022 Himachal Pradesh Legislative Assembly election: Jogindernagar
Party	Candidate	Votes	%	±%
BJP	Prakash Rana	33,782	47.87%	▲11.85
INC	Thakur Surender Paul	29,443	41.73%	▲32.58
CPI(M)	Kushal Bhardwaj	3,137	4.45%	▲0.25
Independent	Sanjeev Bhandari	2,494	3.53%	New
AAP	Ravinder Pal Singh	383	0.54%	New
NOTA	Nota	377	0.53%	▼1.17
Rashtriya Devbhumi Party	Kamal Kant	259	0.37%	New
BSP	Narender Kumar	244	0.35%	▼0.42
Independent	Thakur Surender Singh Advocate	206	0.29%	New
Independent	Baba Lal Giri	99	0.14%	New
Independent	Kulbhushan Thakur	82	0.12%	New
Margin of victory		4,339	6.15%	▼3.57
Turnout		70,563	69.83%	▼5.36
Registered electors		1,01,046		▲11.35
BJP gain from Independent		Swing	▲2.13	

=== Assembly Election 2017 ===
2017 Himachal Pradesh Legislative Assembly election: Jogindernagar
Party	Candidate	Votes	%	±%
Independent	Prakash Rana	31,214	45.74%	New
BJP	Gulab Singh Thakur	24,579	36.02%	▼13.43
INC	Jiwan Lal Thakur	6,244	9.15%	▼30.58
CPI(M)	Kushal Bhardwaj	2,864	4.20%	▲0.82
NOTA	None of the Above	1,162	1.70%	New
BSP	Het Singh Verma	521	0.76%	▼0.01
Margin of victory		6,635	9.72%	▲0.00
Turnout		68,236	75.19%	▲3.38
Registered electors		90,750		▲7.09
Independent gain from BJP		Swing	▼3.71	

=== Assembly Election 2012 ===
2012 Himachal Pradesh Legislative Assembly election: Jogindernagar
Party	Candidate	Votes	%	±%
BJP	Gulab Singh Thakur	30,092	49.45%	▼4.55
INC	Thakur Surender Pal	24,176	39.73%	▼0.22
Independent	Ajay Dharwal	2,343	3.85%	New
CPI(M)	Kushal Bhardwaj	2,056	3.38%	New
NCP	Jagdish Bisht	637	1.05%	New
LJP	Surender Singh Thakur	592	0.97%	▼1.18
BSP	Het Singh	468	0.77%	▼3.03
AITC	Rakesh Palsra	416	0.68%	New
Margin of victory		5,916	9.72%	▼4.32
Turnout		60,854	71.81%	▲2.02
Registered electors		84,738		▲18.60
BJP hold		Swing	▼4.55	

=== Assembly Election 2007 ===
2007 Himachal Pradesh Legislative Assembly election: Jogindernagar
Party	Candidate	Votes	%	±%
BJP	Gulab Singh Thakur	26,926	54.00%	▲14.47
INC	Thakur Surender Paul	19,923	39.95%	▼13.94
BSP	Rakesh Bhardwaj	1,894	3.80%	New
LJP	Rajender Kumar	1,075	2.16%	▲1.40
Margin of victory		7,003	14.04%	▼0.33
Turnout		49,867	69.79%	▼3.22
Registered electors		71,448		▲14.66
BJP gain from INC		Swing	▲0.10	

=== Assembly Election 2003 ===
2003 Himachal Pradesh Legislative Assembly election: Jogindernagar
Party	Candidate	Votes	%	±%
INC	Surender Pal	24,518	53.89%	▲16.67
BJP	Gulab Singh Thakur	17,981	39.52%	▲6.84
LHMP	Prem Nath	1,012	2.22%	New
HVC	Anjna	859	1.89%	▼15.07
Independent	Duni Chand	565	1.24%	New
LJP	Surendra Paul	346	0.76%	New
Margin of victory		6,537	14.37%	▲9.83
Turnout		45,495	73.08%	▲3.61
Registered electors		62,312		▲16.14
INC hold		Swing	▲16.67	

=== Assembly Election 1998 ===
1998 Himachal Pradesh Legislative Assembly election: Jogindernagar
Party	Candidate	Votes	%	±%
INC	Gulab Singh Thakur	13,862	37.23%	▼16.88
BJP	Ganga Ram Jamwal	12,171	32.69%	▲0.15
HVC	Ratan Lal	6,315	16.96%	New
Independent	Khazan Singh	3,562	9.57%	New
BSP	Dewan Chand	862	2.31%	▼3.15
Margin of victory		1,691	4.54%	▼17.04
Turnout		37,237	69.94%	▼3.07
Registered electors		53,652		▲14.27
INC hold		Swing	▼16.88	

=== Assembly Election 1993 ===
1993 Himachal Pradesh Legislative Assembly election: Jogindernagar
Party	Candidate	Votes	%	±%
INC	Gulab Singh Thakur	18,412	54.11%	▼0.08
BJP	Ganga Ram Jamwal	11,070	32.53%	New
CPI(M)	Kishori Lal	2,282	6.71%	New
BSP	Narender Kumar	1,861	5.47%	▲4.52
Margin of victory		7,342	21.58%	▲6.76
Turnout		34,028	73.14%	▲7.49
Registered electors		46,951		▲3.84
INC hold		Swing	▼0.08	

=== Assembly Election 1990 ===
1990 Himachal Pradesh Legislative Assembly election: Jogindernagar
Party	Candidate	Votes	%	±%
INC	Gulab Singh Thakur	15,924	54.19%	▲13.19
JD	Ratan Lal	11,571	39.38%	New
Independent	Karam Chand	671	2.28%	New
Independent	Sunrender Singh	304	1.03%	New
BSP	Narottam Singh	279	0.95%	New
Margin of victory		4,353	14.81%	▲3.77
Turnout		29,384	65.75%	▼6.89
Registered electors		45,215		▲32.26
INC gain from Independent		Swing	▲2.14	

=== Assembly Election 1985 ===
1985 Himachal Pradesh Legislative Assembly election: Jogindernagar
Party	Candidate	Votes	%	±%
Independent	Ratan Lal	12,790	52.05%	New
INC	Gulab Singh Thakur	10,075	41.00%	▲7.39
BJP	Kashmir Singh	1,172	4.77%	▼10.88
CPI(M)	Tara Chand	283	1.15%	▼3.71
Independent	Narotam Singh	252	1.03%	New
Margin of victory		2,715	11.05%	▲8.26
Turnout		24,572	72.85%	▲1.05
Registered electors		34,186		▲2.65
Independent hold		Swing	▲15.65	

=== Assembly Election 1982 ===
1982 Himachal Pradesh Legislative Assembly election: Jogindernagar
Party	Candidate	Votes	%	±%
Independent	Gulab Singh Thakur	8,586	36.40%	New
INC	Ratan Lal	7,928	33.61%	▲2.63
BJP	Ganga Singh	3,692	15.65%	New
Independent	Kashmir Singh	1,542	6.54%	New
CPI(M)	Tara Chand	1,148	4.87%	▼1.97
Independent	Puran Chand Saklani	350	1.48%	New
LKD	Rishi Raj	155	0.66%	New
JP	Piar Singh	152	0.64%	▼36.06
Margin of victory		658	2.79%	▼2.94
Turnout		23,590	71.93%	▲15.77
Registered electors		33,304		▲17.99
Independent gain from JP		Swing	▼0.31	

=== Assembly Election 1977 ===
1977 Himachal Pradesh Legislative Assembly election: Jogindernagar
Party	Candidate	Votes	%	±%
JP	Gulab Singh Thakur	5,705	36.71%	New
INC	Ratan Lal	4,815	30.98%	▲4.27
Independent	Himan Singh	3,701	23.81%	New
CPI(M)	Roshan Lal	1,062	6.83%	▼5.34
Independent	Thaila Ram	142	0.91%	New
Independent	Prabhu	117	0.75%	New
Margin of victory		890	5.73%	▲1.76
Turnout		15,542	56.50%	▲11.12
Registered electors		28,226		▲25.57
JP gain from INC		Swing	▲10.00	

=== Assembly Election 1972 ===
1972 Himachal Pradesh Legislative Assembly election: Jogindernagar
Party	Candidate	Votes	%	±%
INC	Prakash Chandra	2,638	26.71%	▼23.52
Independent	Ratan Lal	2,246	22.74%	New
Independent	Ghanshyam	2,094	21.20%	New
Independent	Mohinder Pal	1,274	12.90%	New
CPI(M)	Tara Chand	1,202	12.17%	▲7.27
Independent	Inder Singh	424	4.29%	New
Margin of victory		392	3.97%	▼32.56
Turnout		9,878	45.62%	▲11.76
Registered electors		22,478		▼22.73
INC hold		Swing	▼23.52	

=== Assembly Election 1967 ===
1967 Himachal Pradesh Legislative Assembly election: Jogindernagar
Party	Candidate	Votes	%	±%
INC	G. Ram	4,702	50.22%	▼18.11
Independent	R. Dass	1,282	13.69%	New
Independent	R. Singh	825	8.81%	New
Independent	Bhader	629	6.72%	New
CPI(M)	Ghaplu	459	4.90%	New
Independent	D. Ram	440	4.70%	New
Independent	N. Chand	430	4.59%	New
ABJS	Roshan	299	3.19%	▼2.7
Independent	A. Ram	296	3.16%	New
Margin of victory		3,420	36.53%	▼17.02
Turnout		9,362	35.13%	▼0.84
Registered electors		29,089		▲96.71
INC hold		Swing	▼18.11	

=== Assembly Election 1952 ===
1952 Himachal Pradesh Legislative Assembly election: Jogindernagar
Party	Candidate	Votes	%	±%
INC	Besar Ram	3,337	68.34%	New
KMPP	Lajpat Rai	722	14.79%	New
ABJS	Som Dev	288	5.90%	New
Independent	Kidareshwar	191	3.91%	New
Independent	Bir Singh	183	3.75%	New
Independent	Sukh Ram	162	3.32%	New
Margin of victory		2,615	53.55%	
Turnout		4,883	33.02%	
Registered electors		14,788		
INC win (new seat)				

== See also ==
- Jogindernagar
- List of constituencies of Himachal Pradesh Legislative Assembly
