= Garhi Assembly constituency =

Legislative Assembly constituency in Rajasthan State, India

Coordinates: 23.59°N 74.15°E

Garhi
- Constituency No. 163 for the Rajasthan Legislative Assembly

Constituency details
- Country: India
- Region: North India
- State: Rajasthan
- District: Banswara
- Lok Sabha constituency: Banswara
- Established: 2008
- Total electors: 289,357
- Reservation: ST

Member of Legislative Assembly
- 16th Rajasthan Legislative Assembly
- Incumbent Kailash Chandra Meena
- Party: Bharatiya Janata Party

Garhi Assembly constituency is one of the 200 Legislative Assembly constituencies of Rajasthan state in India. It comprises Garhi tehsil and parts of Banswara tehsil, both in Banswara district, and is reserved for candidates belonging to the Scheduled Tribes. As of 2023, it is represented by Kailash Chandra Meena of the Bharatiya Janata Party.

== Members of the Legislative Assembly ==
Year	Member	Party
2008	Kanta Garasiya	Indian National Congress
2013	Jeetmal Khant	Bharatiya Janata Party
2018	Kailash Chandra Meena	Bharatiya Janata Party
2023	Kailash Chandra Meena	Bharatiya Janata Party

== Election results ==
=== 2023 ===
2023 Rajasthan Legislative Assembly election: Garhi
Party	Candidate	Votes	%	±%
BJP	Kailash Chandra Meena	87,607	38.61	−9.67
INC	Shankarlal Charpota	72,439	31.92	−4.5
BAP	Mani Lal Garasiya	43,548	19.19	
Independent	Pankaj Charpota	3,947	1.74	
Independent	Shalendra Roat	3,422	1.51	
Independent	Laxman Lal	2,296	1.01	
NOTA	None of the above	5,199	2.29	+0.05
Majority		15,168	6.69	−5.17
Turnout		226,929	78.43	−0.1
BJP hold		Swing		

=== 2018 ===
2018 Rajasthan Legislative Assembly election: Garhi
Party	Candidate	Votes	%	±%
BJP	Kailash Chandra Meena	99,350	48.28	
INC	Kanta Bhil	74,949	36.42	
BTP	Raju	23,093	11.22	
BSP	Chetan	2,618	1.27	
NOTA	None of the above	4,619	2.24	
Majority		24,401	11.86	
Turnout		205,788	78.53	
BJP hold		Swing		

== See also ==
- List of constituencies of the Rajasthan Legislative Assembly
- Banswara district
