= Bagidora Assembly constituency =

Legislative Assembly constituency in Rajasthan State, India

Coordinates: 23.4°N 74.27°E

Bagidora
- Constituency No. 165 for the Rajasthan Legislative Assembly

Constituency details
- Country: India
- Region: North India
- State: Rajasthan
- District: Banswara
- Lok Sabha constituency: Banswara
- Established: 1972
- Total electors: 264,743
- Reservation: ST

Member of Legislative Assembly
- 16th Rajasthan Legislative Assembly
- Incumbent Jaikrishn Patel
- Party: BAP
- Alliance: INDIA
- Elected year: 2024

Bagidora Assembly constituency is one of the 200 Legislative Assembly constituencies of Rajasthan state in India.

It is part of Banswara district and is reserved for candidates belonging to the Scheduled Tribes. As of 2024, it is represented by Jaikrishn Patel of the Bharat Adivasi Party party.

== Members of the Legislative Assembly ==
Year	Name	Party
1977	Nathu Ram	Janata Party
1985	Nathu Ram	Indian National Congress
1985	Panna Lal	Indian National Congress
1990	Soma	Janata Dal
1993	Poonja Lal	Janata Dal
1998	Jeetmal Khant	Janata Dal
2003	Jeetmal Khant	Janata Dal (United)
2008	Mahendrajeet Singh Malviya	Indian National Congress
2013	Mahendrajeet Singh Malviya	Indian National Congress
2018	Mahendrajeet Singh Malviya	Indian National Congress
2023	Mahendrajeet Singh Malviya	Indian National Congress
2024	Jaikrishn Patel	Bharat Adivasi Party

== Election results ==
=== 2024 bypoll ===
Rajasthan Legislative Assembly by-election, 2024: Bagidora
Party	Candidate	Votes	%	±%
BAP	Jaikrishn Patel	122,573	58.45	▲31.35
BJP	Subhash Tamboliya	71,139	33.92	▲13.62
INC	Kapoor Singh	8,904	4.25	▼41.45
NOTA	None of the Above	7,092	3.38	▲2.58
Majority		51,434	24.53	▲5.63
Turnout		209,708		
BAP gain from INC		Swing	▲31.35	

=== 2023 ===
Rajasthan Legislative Assembly Election, 2023: Bagidora
Party	Candidate	Votes	%	±%
INC	Mahendrajeet Singh Malviya	101,742	45.65	−3.7
BAP	Jaikrishn Patel	60,387	27.09	
BJP	Krishna Katara	45,140	20.25	−18.33
BTP	Basant Lal Garasiya	8,517	3.82	−1.0
BSP	Pravin	2,759	1.24	−0.43
NOTA	None of the above	4,335	1.94	−0.88
Majority		41,355	18.56	+7.79
Turnout		222,880	84.19	+0.75
INC hold		Swing		

=== 2018 ===
2018 Rajasthan Legislative Assembly election: Bagidora
Party	Candidate	Votes	%	±%
INC	Mahendrajeet Singh Malviya	97,638	49.35	
BJP	Khemraj Garasiya	76,328	38.58	
BTP	Kamalkant Katara	9,538	4.82	
BSP	Ratan	3,309	1.67	
Independent	Jahu	2,837	1.43	
NOTA	None of the above	5,581	2.82	
Majority		21,310	10.77	
Turnout		197,862	83.44	

== See also ==
- List of constituencies of the Rajasthan Legislative Assembly
- Banswara district
