= Prakash Rana =

Indian politician (born 1962)

Prakash Rana (born 1962) is an Indian politician from Himachal Pradesh. He is a member of the Himachal Pradesh Legislative Assembly from Jogindernagar Assembly constituency in Mandi district. He won the 2022 Himachal Pradesh Legislative Assembly election representing the Bharatiya Janata Party.

== Early life and education ==
Rana is from Golwan village, Mandi district, Himachal Pradesh. He is the son of Prem Kumar. He studied and passed the matriculation examinations conducted by the Himachal Pradesh Board of School Education.

However due to financial constraints at home, he was unable to pursue further studies and instead transitioned into building practical skills and gaining work experience.

== Career ==
Rana won from Jogindernagar Assembly constituency representing the Bharatiya Janata Party in the 2022 Himachal Pradesh Legislative Assembly election. He polled 33,782 votes and defeated his nearest rival, Surender Paul Thakur of the Indian National Congress, by a margin of 4,339 votes. He became an MLA for the first time winning the 2017 Himachal Pradesh Legislative Assembly election as an independent candidate. He defeated Gulab Singh Thakur, father in law of union minister Anurag Thakur. In July 2022, he joined the BJP and was nominated to contest again from Jogindernagar seat.
