= Banswara Assembly constituency =

Legislative Assembly constituency in Rajasthan State, India

Coordinates: 23.55°N 74.43°E

Banswara
- Constituency No. 164 for the Rajasthan Legislative Assembly

Constituency details
- Country: India
- Region: North India
- State: Rajasthan
- District: Banswara
- Lok Sabha constituency: Banswara
- Established: 1972
- Total electors: 281,013
- Reservation: ST

Member of Legislative Assembly
- 16th Rajasthan Legislative Assembly
- Incumbent Arjun Singh Bamniya
- Party: Indian National Congress
- Elected year: 2023

Banswara Assembly constituency is one of the 200 Legislative Assembly constituencies of Rajasthan state in India.

It is part of Banswara district, and is reserved for candidates belonging to the Scheduled Tribes. As of 2023, it is represented by Arjun Singh Bamnia of the Indian National Congress party.

== Members of the Legislative Assembly ==
Year	Name	Party
2003	Bhawani Joshi	Bharatiya Janata Party
2008	Arjun Singh Bamniya	Indian National Congress
2013	Dhan Singh Rawat	Bharatiya Janata Party
2018	Arjun Singh Bamniya	Indian National Congress
2023	Arjun Singh Bamniya	Indian National Congress

== Election results ==
=== 2023 ===
2023 Rajasthan Legislative Assembly election: Banswara
Party	Candidate	Votes	%	±%
INC	Arjun Singh Bamaniya	93,017	40.54	−2.84
BJP	Dhan Singh Rawat	91,617	39.93	+5.56
BAP	Hemant Rana	34,666	15.11	
Independent	Dhan Singh Bhil	3,327	1.45	
NOTA	None of the above	3,528	1.54	−0.38
Majority		1,400	0.61	−8.4
Turnout		229,452	81.65	+0.0
INC hold		Swing		

=== 2018 ===
Rajasthan Legislative Assembly Election, 2018: Banswara
Party	Candidate	Votes	%	±%
INC	Arjun Singh Bamnia	88,447	43.38	
BJP	Hakru Maida	70,081	34.37	
Independent	Dhan Singh Rawat	32,950	16.16	
JD(U)	Dhirajmal Dindor	5,009	2.46	
BSP	Shanta	2,223	1.09	
NOTA	None of the above	3,910	1.92	
Majority		18,366	9.01	
Turnout		203,878	81.65	

== See also ==
- List of constituencies of the Rajasthan Legislative Assembly
- Banswara district
