= Mahendrajeet Singh Malviya =

Indian politician (born 2 December 1960)

Cabinet minister Water Resources IGNP Water Resources Planning Department Government of Rajasthan
- In office 21 November 2021 – 15 December 2023
- Preceded by: Vasundhara Raje Scindia
- Succeeded by: Bhajan Lal Sharma

Minister of state of Panchayati Raj & Rural Development, Tribal Area Development, Public Grievance Redressal, Technical Education Department Government of Rajasthan
- In office December 2008 – December 2013

Member of 12th Lok Sabha
- In office 1998–1999
- Preceded by: Tarachand Bhagora
- Succeeded by: Tarachand Bhagora
- Constituency: Banswara

Member of Rajasthan Legislative Assembly
- In office 2008 – 19 February 2024
- Preceded by: Jeetmal Khant
- Succeeded by: Jaikrishn Patel
- Constituency: Bagidora

Personal details
- Born: 2 December 1960 (age 65)
- Party: Indian National Congress (2026 - Present) (1998 - 2024)
- Other political affiliations: Bharatiya Janata Party (2024 - 2026)
- Spouse: Shreemati Resham Malviya

Mahendrajeet singh Malviya (born 2 December 1960) is an Indian politician. He served as Cabinet Minister of Water Resources IGNP Water Resources Planning Department in the Government of Rajasthan. He formerly served as Member of Parliament, 12th Lok Sabha in Banswara Lok Sabha constituency. He has been a Member of Rajasthan Legislative Assembly from Bagidora Assembly constituency. He was a member of the Bharatiya Janata Party. Previously he was a member of CWC (Congress Working Committee). On 18 January 2026 he rejoined the Congress party.
