= Simalwara =

Simalwara Seemalwara
- Census town
- Location in Rajasthan, India Simalwara (India)
- Coordinates: 23.56°N 73.74°E
- Country: India
- State: Rajasthan
- District: Dungarpur
- Tehsil: Simalwara
- Elevation: 244 m (801 ft)

Population (2001)
  - Total: 6,500

Languages
  - Official: Hindi
- Time zone: UTC+5:30 (IST)

Simalwara is a census town in Dungarpur district in the Indian state of Rajasthan. It is the administrative headquarters for Simalwara Tehsil.

== Geography ==
Simalwara is located at 23.56°N 73.74°E. It has an average elevation of 244 metres (800 feet). Simalwara is famous for its market, Hanuman temple, Shree Vishwanath Mahadev Temple, Shree Dwarkadhish temple, Masjid-E-Jarina, Pathan Masjid, 1756AD Historical Karan Palace Rawla 1st Hindu 2nd Muslim-Ganchi. It is a major trading hub for nearby villages.

== Demographics ==
As of 2001 India census, Simalwara had a population of 15,000. Males constitute 49% of the population and females 51%. Simalwara has an average literacy rate of 59% slightly lower than the national average of 59.5%: Male literacy is 68%, and female literacy is 50%. In Simalwara, 16% of the population is under 6 years of age.

== Features ==
Simalwara is the Four largest place after Banswara and Dungapur in the Vaagar area of Rajasthan. Economically, these three places compete. Galiyakot, a tourist attraction, is located 40 km from the city. Simalwara is also popular for near by towns for market. It is market hub because of it is at the border of Rajasthan and Gujarat.

== Festivals in Dungarpur ==
One of the major fairs which is held in Dungarpur is the Baneshwar fair. The Baneshwar fair is held in the month of February at Baneshwar, a small delta formed by the river Soma and Mahi, about 50 km from Dungarpur. This fair is one of the biggest and most important fair of the Bhils. 'Baneshwar' means the ‘master of the delta’ and is derived from the Shiva Linga kept in the Mahadev temple in Dungarpur. This is a religious fair with simple and traditional rituals. The tribal folks of Bhils gather here from the neighbouring states of Madhya Pradesh and Gujarat and offer prayers to Lord Shiva.
