= Ratan Lal =

Indian politician (born 1924)

Member of Parliament, Lok Sabha
- In office 1962–1967
- Preceded by: P B Bhogji Bhai
- Succeeded by: Heerji Bhai
- Constituency: Banswara

Personal details
- Born: 1 January 1924
- Party: Indian National Congress
- Spouse: Kamala

Ratan Lal (born 1 January 1924) was an Indian politician. He was elected to the Lok Sabha, the lower house of the Parliament of India, from Banswara in Rajasthan, as a member of the Indian National Congress.

== Electoral performance ==
1998 Himachal Pradesh Legislative Assembly election: Jogindernagar
Party	Candidate	Votes	%	±%
INC	Gulab Singh Thakur	13,862	37.23%	▼16.88
BJP	Ganga Ram Jamwal	12,171	32.69%	▲0.15
HVC	Ratan Lal	6,315	16.96%	New
Independent	Khazan Singh	3,562	9.57%	New
BSP	Dewan Chand	862	2.31%	▼3.15
Margin of victory		1,691	4.54%	▼17.04
Turnout		37,237	69.94%	▼3.07
Registered electors		53,652		▲14.27
INC hold		Swing	▼16.88	

1990 Himachal Pradesh Legislative Assembly election: Jogindernagar
Party	Candidate	Votes	%	±%
INC	Gulab Singh Thakur	15,924	54.19%	▲13.19
JD	Ratan Lal	11,571	39.38%	New
Independent	Karam Chand	671	2.28%	New
Independent	Sunrender Singh	304	1.03%	New
BSP	Narottam Singh	279	0.95%	New
Margin of victory		4,353	14.81%	▲3.77
Turnout		29,384	65.75%	▼6.89
Registered electors		45,215		▲32.26
INC gain from Independent		Swing	▲2.14	

1985 Himachal Pradesh Legislative Assembly election: Jogindernagar
Party	Candidate	Votes	%	±%
Independent	Ratan Lal	12,790	52.05%	New
INC	Gulab Singh Thakur	10,075	41.00%	▲7.39
BJP	Kashmir Singh	1,172	4.77%	▼10.88
CPI(M)	Tara Chand	283	1.15%	▼3.71
Independent	Narotam Singh	252	1.03%	New
Margin of victory		2,715	11.05%	▲8.26
Turnout		24,572	72.85%	▲1.05
Registered electors		34,186		▲2.65
Independent hold		Swing	▲15.65	

1982 Himachal Pradesh Legislative Assembly election: Jogindernagar
Party	Candidate	Votes	%	±%
Independent	Gulab Singh Thakur	8,586	36.40%	New
INC	Ratan Lal	7,928	33.61%	▲2.63
BJP	Ganga Singh	3,692	15.65%	New
Independent	Kashmir Singh	1,542	6.54%	New
CPI(M)	Tara Chand	1,148	4.87%	▼1.97
Independent	Puran Chand Saklani	350	1.48%	New
LKD	Rishi Raj	155	0.66%	New
JP	Piar Singh	152	0.64%	▼36.06
Margin of victory		658	2.79%	▼2.94
Turnout		23,590	71.93%	▲15.77
Registered electors		33,304		▲17.99
Independent gain from JP		Swing	▼0.31	

1977 Himachal Pradesh Legislative Assembly election: Jogindernagar
Party	Candidate	Votes	%	±%
JP	Gulab Singh Thakur	5,705	36.71%	New
INC	Ratan Lal	4,815	30.98%	▲4.27
Independent	Himan Singh	3,701	23.81%	New
CPI(M)	Roshan Lal	1,062	6.83%	▼5.34
Independent	Thaila Ram	142	0.91%	New
Independent	Prabhu	117	0.75%	New
Margin of victory		890	5.73%	▲1.76
Turnout		15,542	56.50%	▲11.12
Registered electors		28,226		▲25.57
JP gain from INC		Swing	▲10.00	

1972 Himachal Pradesh Legislative Assembly election: Jogindernagar
Party	Candidate	Votes	%	±%
INC	Prakash Chandra	2,638	26.71%	▼23.52
Independent	Ratan Lal	2,246	22.74%	New
Independent	Ghanshyam	2,094	21.20%	New
Independent	Mohinder Pal	1,274	12.90%	New
CPI(M)	Tara Chand	1,202	12.17%	▲7.27
Independent	Inder Singh	424	4.29%	New
Margin of victory		392	3.97%	▼32.56
Turnout		9,878	45.62%	▲11.76
Registered electors		22,478		▼22.73
INC hold		Swing	▼23.52	
