= Heerji Bhai =

Indian politician

Member of Parliament, Lok Sabha
- In office 1967–1971
- Preceded by: Ratan Lal
- Succeeded by: Hira Lal Doda
- Constituency: Banswara

Personal details
- Born: 6 April 1941
- Party: Indian National Congress
- Spouse: Jiwan Bai

Heerji Bhai is an Indian politician. He was elected to the Lok Sabha, the lower house of the Parliament of India, from Banswara in Rajasthan, as a member of the Indian National Congress.
