= Dhan Singh Rawat (Rajasthan politician) =

Indian politician

Member Of Parliament, Lok Sabha
- In office 2004–2009
- Preceded by: Tarachand Bhagora
- Succeeded by: Tarachand Bhagora
- Constituency: Banswara

Personal details
- Born: 24 October 1966 (age 59) Banswara, Rajasthan
- Party: Bharatiya Janata Party
- Spouse: Usha Rawat
- Children: 3
- As of 29 October, 2020

Dhan Singh Rawat (born 24 October 1966) is a member of the 14th Lok Sabha of India. He represents the Banswara constituency of Rajasthan, and is a member of the Bharatiya Janata Party.
