= Kushalgarh Assembly constituency =

Legislative Assembly constituency in Rajasthan State, India

Coordinates: 23.2°N 74.45°E

Kushalgarh
- Constituency No. 166 for the Rajasthan Legislative Assembly

Constituency details
- Country: India
- Region: North India
- State: Rajasthan
- District: Banswara
- Lok Sabha constituency: Banswara
- Established: 1972
- Total electors: 264,875
- Reservation: ST

Member of Legislative Assembly
- 16th Rajasthan Legislative Assembly
- Incumbent Ramila Khadiya
- Party: Indian National Congress
- Elected year: 2023

Kushalgarh Assembly constituency is one of the 200 Legislative Assembly constituencies of Rajasthan state in India.

It is part of Banswara district and is reserved for candidates belonging to the Scheduled Tribes.

== Members of the Legislative Assembly ==
Election	Name	Party
1998	Fateh Singh	Janata Dal
2003	Fateh Singh	Janata Dal
2008	Fateh Singh	Janata Dal
2013	Bhima Bhai	Bharatiya Janata Party
2018	Ramila Khadiya	Independent
2023	Ramila Khadiya	Indian National Congress

== Election results ==
=== 2023 ===
2023 Rajasthan Legislative Assembly election: Kushalgarh
Party	Candidate	Votes	%	±%
INC	Ramila Khadiya	97,480	41.48	
BJP	Bheema Bhai	87,676	37.31	−0.79
BAP	Rajendra	33,758	14.37	
Independent	Someshwar Garasiya	4,327	1.84	
AAP	Vijaysingh Maida	2,480	1.06	
NOTA	None of the above	4,410	1.88	−3.68
Majority		9,804	4.17	−5.4
Turnout		234,979	88.71	+2.22
INC gain from Independent		Swing		

=== 2018 ===
Rajasthan Legislative Assembly Election, 2018: Kushalgarh
Party	Candidate	Votes	%	±%
Independent	Ramila Khadiya	94,344	47.67	
BJP	Bhima Bhai	75,394	38.1	
BSP	Chagan	6,016	3.04	
Independent	Devchand Mavi	3,011	1.52	
Abhinav Rajasthan Party	Dinesh	2,527	1.28	
Loktantrik Janta Dal	Fateh Singh	2,281	1.15	
NOTA	None of the above	11,002	5.56	
Majority		18,950	9.57	
Turnout		197,900	86.49	
Independent gain from BJP		Swing		

== See also ==
- List of constituencies of the Rajasthan Legislative Assembly
- Banswara district
