= Baneshwar fair =

Annual tribal fair in Dungarpur, Rajasthan

Baneshwar Fair
- Genre: Hindu fair
- Dates: Held in the month of January or February (2 weeks following the new moon night in the month of Magh in the Vikram Samvat calendar)
- Locations: Baneshwar, Dungarpur district, Rajasthan, India
- Participants: Hindu Bhils, villagers from Dungarpur, Udaipur, Banswara districts
- Patrons: Hindu Bhils, devotees of Baneshwar Mahadev and Mavji

Baneshwar fair is an annual tribal fair held in Dungarpur district in Rajasthan state of India. The fair is held in the month of January or February (2 weeks following the new moon night in the month of Magh in the Vikram Samvat calendar) at Baneshwar, near the confluence of the Som and Mahi rivers. This fair is a major fair in tribal culture and has been described as "the Kumbh mela for the tribals".

== The Fair ==
Baneshwar fair in its present form is actually one of two fairs: one which used to be held in of Baneshwar Mahadev (Lord Shiva) and another fair, which started after the construction of the Vishnu Temple by Jankunwari, daughter-in-law of Mavji, a highly revered saint considered to be an incarnation of Lord Vishnu.

Two disciples of Mavji named Aje and Vaje built the Lakshmi- Narain Temple near the confluence of rivers Som and Mahi. The 'pran-pratishtha' ceremony of the idols was performed on Magh Shukla Ekadashi and since then, the fair is held on this day. The large congregation that gathers here at the time of the fair pays homage to all the deities with equal reverence.

On Magh Shukla Ekadashi, the priest – called the Mathadhish, arrives at the fair site from Sabla, in a huge procession. A 16-cm silver image of Mavji on horseback is also brought here. The river water supposedly becomes holier when the Mathadhish takes a bath. Hence, people bathe along with him in the river. The Bhils consign the ashes of their dead at the confluence of the rivers.

The Baneshwar fair is predominantly a tribal fair with more than half of the congregation consisting of Bhils. They revere Baneshwar Mahadev as well as Mavji. The majority of the gathering is from the Districts of Dungarpur, Udaipur and Banswara.

== Worship and Offerings ==
The temple of Baneshwar Mahadev remains open from 5.00 a.m. to 11.00 p.m. during the fair. In the morning, saffron is applied to the Shivlinga after it is bathed and an 'aarti' of burning incense is waved before it. In the evening, 'bhabhut' (ash) is applied to the Linga and an 'aarti' with a fine-wick lamp is waved. Devotees offer wheat flour, pulses, rice, jaggery, ghee, salt, chillies, coconut and cash.

Prayers are offered five times a day in the temples of Lakshmi -Narayan and Brahma. Brass gongs are struck at the time of 'aarti'. During the fair, 'aarti' of Mathadhish is also performed and Raslila takes place at night in the Lakshmi Narayan Temple. Offerings, similar to those at the Baneshwar Temple, are made at these shrines too.

== Cultural Programmes ==
The Bhils attending Baneshwar Fair sing traditional folk songs in high pitched voices sitting around a bonfire every night. Cultural shows are arranged by youngsters of the clan. Groups of villagers are also invited to participate in the programme.

The fair resounds with the gaiety of songs, folk dances, magic shows, animal shows and acrobatic feats. Adding to the excitement are the joy rides on merry-go-rounds and swings. The large number of shops in the fair provides an opportunity for buying and selling of essential goods and fancy articles.

Celebrated In : Dungarpur, 110 km from Udaipur, Rajasthan.

Deity : Shivalinga

Temple : Mahadev Temple

Time of the festivity : Month of February
