= Ramila Khadiya =

Indian politician

Member of the Rajasthan Legislative Assembly
- Incumbent
- Assumed office 2018
- Constituency: Kushalgarh Assembly constituency

Personal details
- Born: 1969 (age 56–57) Vadnagar, Rajasthan, India
- Party: Indian National Congress
- Occupation: Politician, Agriculture, Business (Gas Agency)

Ramila Khadiya (born 1969) is an Indian politician from Rajasthan. She is a two-time MLA from Kushalgarh Assembly constituency in Banswara district which is reserved for ST community. She represents Indian National Congress Party. She won the Rajasthan Legislative Assembly elections in 2018 and 2023.

== Early life and education ==
Khadiya was born in Vadnagar. Though her primary occupation is agriculture, she also runs a business, a gas agency. In April 2023, before the Assembly elections, her brother Balwan Singh died in an accident.

== Career ==
Khadiya won as MLA for the first time in 2018 from Kushalgarh Assembly Constituency. She won the 2018 Rajasthan Legislative Assembly election defeating Bhima Bhai of Bharatiya Janata Party by a margin of 17,950 votes. She won again, despite Congress faring badly, from the same constituency in the 2023 Rajasthan Legislative Assembly election defeating the same opponent by 9,804 votes. She was involved in a controversy in 2021, when a video of her, allegedly slapping a constable, went viral.
