= Heera Bhai =

Indian politician

Member of Parliament, Lok Sabha
- In office 1977–1980
- Preceded by: Hira Lal Doda
- Succeeded by: Bheekha Bhai
- Constituency: Banswara

Member of Parliament, Lok Sabha
- In office 1989–1991
- Preceded by: Prabhu Lal Rawat
- Succeeded by: Prabhu Lal Rawat
- Constituency: Banswara

Personal details
- Born: 25 December 1922 Kakanwani, Banswara District
- Died: 25 December 1995 (aged 73) Rajasthan, India
- Party: Janata Dal
- Other political affiliations: Bharatiya Lok Dal; Samyukta Socialist Party; Janata Party

Heera Bhai (25 December 1922 – 25 December 1995) was an Indian politician from Janata Dal. He was a member of 6th Lok Sabha and 9th Lok Sabha from Banswara constituency in Rajasthan. He started his political career in 1957 when he was elected to Rajasthan Legislative Assembly. In 1960 he was elected as first mayor of Agra Municipal Corporation . Bhai died on 25 December 1995.
