= Gulab Singh Thakur =

Indian politician

Gulab Singh Thakur (born 29 May 1948 in Jogindernagar, Mandi district) is an Indian politician from Bharatiya Janata Party. He was a former speaker of Himachal Pradesh Legislative Assembly in India.

He was elected as an MLA from Jogindernagar constituency on ticket of Bharatiya Janata Party and became PWD & revenue minister in 2007 and an MLA in 2012, of Janata Party in 1977, of Indian National Congress in 1990, 1993 and 1998 and as an independent candidate in 1980. He was unanimously elected to the office of Speaker on 30 March 1998. He has been elected from the Joginder nagar constituency 7 times.

His daughter Sheffali Thakur is married to Anurag Thakur, a union minister of sports & youth affairs and information and broadcasting elected as a Lok Sabha member from Hamirpur and son of Prem Kumar Dhumal, the former Chief Minister of Himachal Pradesh.

== Electoral performance ==
2017 Himachal Pradesh Legislative Assembly election: Jogindernagar
Party	Candidate	Votes	%	±%
Independent	Prakash Rana	31,214	45.74%	New
BJP	Gulab Singh Thakur	24,579	36.02%	▼13.43
INC	Jiwan Lal Thakur	6,244	9.15%	▼30.58
CPI(M)	Kushal Bhardwaj	2,864	4.20%	▲0.82
NOTA	None of the Above	1,162	1.70%	New
BSP	Het Singh Verma	521	0.76%	▼0.01
Margin of victory		6,635	9.72%	▲0.00
Turnout		68,236	75.19%	▲3.38
Registered electors		90,750		▲7.09
Independent gain from BJP		Swing	▼3.71	

2012 Himachal Pradesh Legislative Assembly election: Jogindernagar
Party	Candidate	Votes	%	±%
BJP	Gulab Singh Thakur	30,092	49.45%	▼4.55
INC	Thakur Surender Pal	24,176	39.73%	▼0.22
Independent	Ajay Dharwal	2,343	3.85%	New
CPI(M)	Kushal Bhardwaj	2,056	3.38%	New
NCP	Jagdish Bisht	637	1.05%	New
LJP	Surender Singh Thakur	592	0.97%	▼1.18
BSP	Het Singh	468	0.77%	▼3.03
AITC	Rakesh Palsra	416	0.68%	New
Margin of victory		5,916	9.72%	▼4.32
Turnout		60,854	71.81%	▲2.02
Registered electors		84,738		▲18.60
BJP hold		Swing	▼4.55	

2007 Himachal Pradesh Legislative Assembly election: Jogindernagar
Party	Candidate	Votes	%	±%
BJP	Gulab Singh Thakur	26,926	54.00%	▲14.47
INC	Thakur Surender Paul	19,923	39.95%	▼13.94
BSP	Rakesh Bhardwaj	1,894	3.80%	New
LJP	Rajender Kumar	1,075	2.16%	▲1.40
Margin of victory		7,003	14.04%	▼0.33
Turnout		49,867	69.79%	▼3.22
Registered electors		71,448		▲14.66
BJP gain from INC		Swing	▲0.10	

2003 Himachal Pradesh Legislative Assembly election: Jogindernagar
Party	Candidate	Votes	%	±%
INC	Surender Pal	24,518	53.89%	▲16.67
BJP	Gulab Singh Thakur	17,981	39.52%	▲6.84
LHMP	Prem Nath	1,012	2.22%	New
HVC	Anjna	859	1.89%	▼15.07
Independent	Duni Chand	565	1.24%	New
LJP	Surendra Paul	346	0.76%	New
Margin of victory		6,537	14.37%	▲9.83
Turnout		45,495	73.08%	▲3.61
Registered electors		62,312		▲16.14
INC hold		Swing	▲16.67	

1998 Himachal Pradesh Legislative Assembly election: Jogindernagar
Party	Candidate	Votes	%	±%
INC	Gulab Singh Thakur	13,862	37.23%	▼16.88
BJP	Ganga Ram Jamwal	12,171	32.69%	▲0.15
HVC	Ratan Lal	6,315	16.96%	New
Independent	Khazan Singh	3,562	9.57%	New
BSP	Dewan Chand	862	2.31%	▼3.15
Margin of victory		1,691	4.54%	▼17.04
Turnout		37,237	69.94%	▼3.07
Registered electors		53,652		▲14.27
INC hold		Swing	▼16.88	

1993 Himachal Pradesh Legislative Assembly election: Jogindernagar
Party	Candidate	Votes	%	±%
INC	Gulab Singh Thakur	18,412	54.11%	▼0.08
BJP	Ganga Ram Jamwal	11,070	32.53%	New
CPI(M)	Kishori Lal	2,282	6.71%	New
BSP	Narender Kumar	1,861	5.47%	▲4.52
Margin of victory		7,342	21.58%	▲6.76
Turnout		34,028	73.14%	▲7.49
Registered electors		46,951		▲3.84
INC hold		Swing	▼0.08	

1990 Himachal Pradesh Legislative Assembly election: Jogindernagar
Party	Candidate	Votes	%	±%
INC	Gulab Singh Thakur	15,924	54.19%	▲13.19
JD	Ratan Lal	11,571	39.38%	New
Independent	Karam Chand	671	2.28%	New
Independent	Sunrender Singh	304	1.03%	New
BSP	Narottam Singh	279	0.95%	New
Margin of victory		4,353	14.81%	▲3.77
Turnout		29,384	65.75%	▼6.89
Registered electors		45,215		▲32.26
INC gain from Independent		Swing	▲2.14	

1985 Himachal Pradesh Legislative Assembly election: Jogindernagar
Party	Candidate	Votes	%	±%
Independent	Ratan Lal	12,790	52.05%	New
INC	Gulab Singh Thakur	10,075	41.00%	▲7.39
BJP	Kashmir Singh	1,172	4.77%	▼10.88
CPI(M)	Tara Chand	283	1.15%	▼3.71
Independent	Narotam Singh	252	1.03%	New
Margin of victory		2,715	11.05%	▲8.26
Turnout		24,572	72.85%	▲1.05
Registered electors		34,186		▲2.65
Independent hold		Swing	▲15.65	

1982 Himachal Pradesh Legislative Assembly election: Jogindernagar
Party	Candidate	Votes	%	±%
Independent	Gulab Singh Thakur	8,586	36.40%	New
INC	Ratan Lal	7,928	33.61%	▲2.63
BJP	Ganga Singh	3,692	15.65%	New
Independent	Kashmir Singh	1,542	6.54%	New
CPI(M)	Tara Chand	1,148	4.87%	▼1.97
Independent	Puran Chand Saklani	350	1.48%	New
LKD	Rishi Raj	155	0.66%	New
JP	Piar Singh	152	0.64%	▼36.06
Margin of victory		658	2.79%	▼2.94
Turnout		23,590	71.93%	▲15.77
Registered electors		33,304		▲17.99
Independent gain from JP		Swing	▼0.31	
