= Manshankar Ninama =

Indian politician

Member of the India Parliament for Banswara
- In office 2014–2019
- Constituency: Banswara

Personal details
- Born: 15 October 1959 (age 66) Kanji Ka Gada Ghatol, Banswara, Rajasthan
- Party: Bharatiya Janata Party
- Spouse: Smt. Sattu Devi Ninama
- Children: 5
- Occupation: Agriculturist

Manshankar Ninama is a member of the Bharatiya Janata Party and has won the 2014 Indian general elections from the Banswara (Lok Sabha constituency).
