= Kailash Chandra Meena =

Indian politician

Member of Rajasthan Legislative Assembly
- Incumbent
- Assumed office 2018
- Preceded by: Jeetmal Khant
- Constituency: Garhi

Personal details
- Born: 5 July 1965 (age 60) Chandanpura, Banswara
- Party: Bharatiya Janata Party
- Spouse: Santu Meena

Kailash Chandra Meena (born 5 July 1965) is a member of the Rajasthan Legislative Assembly from Garhi constituency.
