= Arjun Singh Bamniya =

Indian politician

State Minister of Tribal Area Development (IC), PHED, Ground Water, Government of Rajasthan
- In office November 2021 – December 2023
- Succeeded by: Babulal Kharadi

State Minister of Government of Rajasthan
- In office December 2018 – November 2021

Member of Rajasthan Legislative Assembly
- Incumbent
- Assumed office December 2018
- Constituency: Banswara Assembly constituency
- In office 2003–2013

Personal details
- Born: September 5, 1963 (age 62) Malvasa, Banswara
- Political party: Indian National Congress
- Spouse: Surta Devi
- Parents: Punjaji Bamaniya (father); Chaturi Devi (mother)

Arjun Singh Bamniya (born 5 September 1963) is an Indian politician and former State Minister in the Government of Rajasthan. He is a member of the Rajasthan Legislative Assembly from the Banswara Assembly constituency. Bamniya is a member of the Indian National Congress.
