= Baneshwar =

Baneshwar Temple
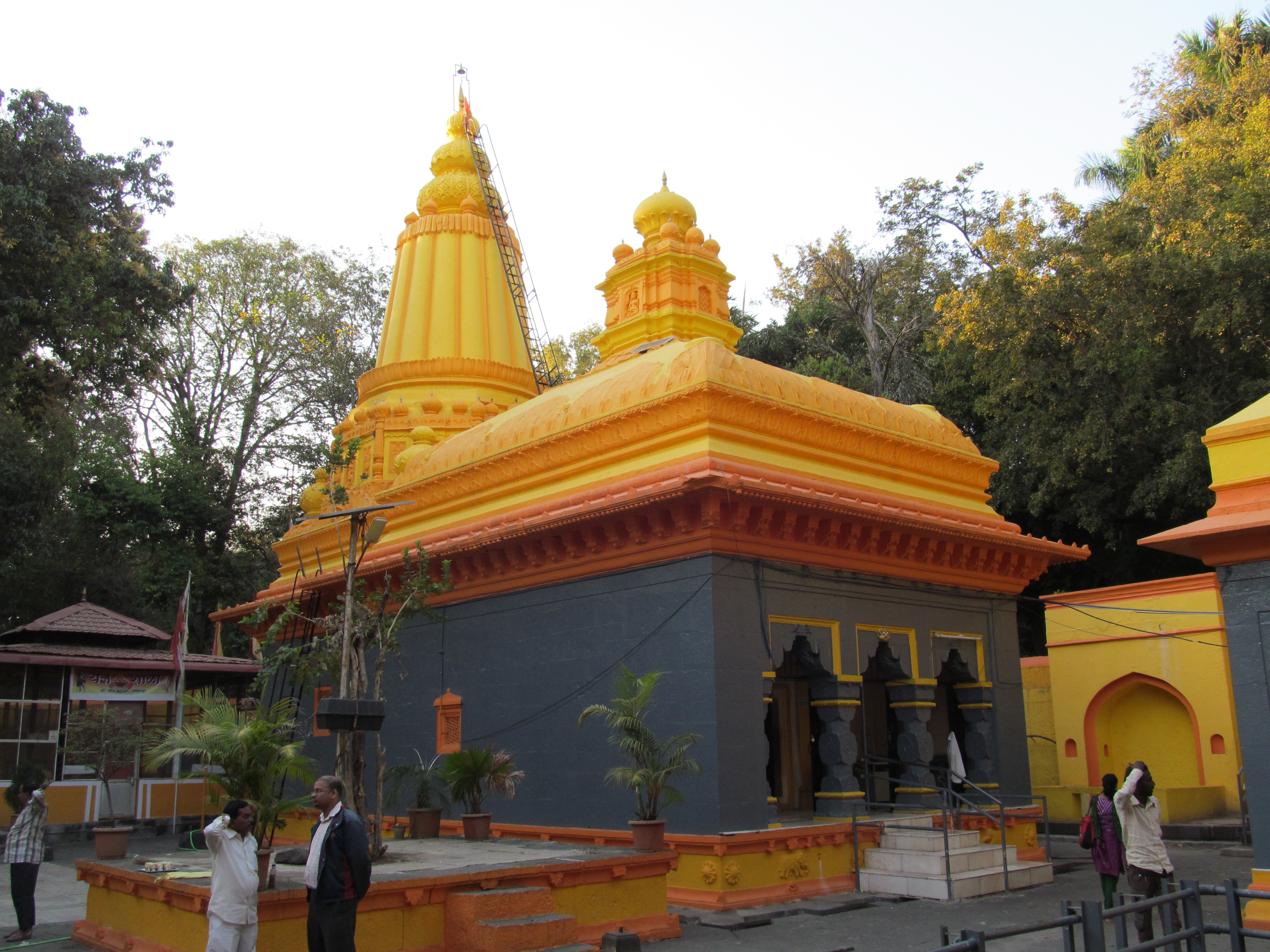
- Baneshwar (Maharashtra, India)

- Location in Maharashtra

Religion
- Affiliation: Hinduism
- District: Pune
- Deity: Shiva
- Festival: Mahashivratri

Location
- Location: Baneshwar
- State: Maharashtra
- Country: India
- Interactive map of Baneshwar Temple
- Coordinates: 18.34°N 73.47°E

Architecture
- Creator: Balaji Baji Rao
- Completed: 1749

Website
- http://www.shreebaneshwar.com/

Baneshwar Temple

The word "Baneshwar" is coined with a very literal sense where "Ban" means Forest and Ishwar stands for God. So when the God resides within a forest, the place can be rightly named as Baneshwar. This name is given to the Baneshwar temple which is located in the midst of a dense green patch.

== Legend ==
Baneshwar temple architecture is from the medieval period. The temple was constructed in 1749 by Balaji Baji Rao, son of Peshwa Bajirao I.The total cost of construction was 11,426 Rupees, 8 Aane, 6 Paise. The temple hosts an important bell which was captured by Chimaji Appa after defeating the Portuguese in the battle of Bassien in 1739. The bell has the year 1683 and a Cross on it, which depicts that the bell belonged to a church and was transported as a token of victory. Same kind of 4 more Portuguese bells can be found at Bhimashankar Temple, Omkareshwar temple- Pune, Shiva temple(Menavali-Wai) and Ramling temple(Shirur) too.

== Surroundings ==
Baneshwar is a conserve forest area and wildlife sanctuary where a variety of birds, flowers, plants can be seen. Baneshwar is worth visiting for jungle lovers and trekkers as well as for pilgrims. This temple is very famous in Pune and people from all around come to visit this temple. The Red-eared slider and soft shell turtle can be seen in the holy pond in the temple. There is a scenic waterfall behind the premises of the Mandir.

== Transportation ==
Baneshwar is approximately 37 km from Pune and 200 km from Mumbai. From Pune Government MSRTC buses are available at a regular frequency.

== Visit period ==
The best time to visit is between August and February. Though any time of the year is good to visit, it is better to avoid visiting during summer. Similarly during monsoon unless one likes trekking, it is better to avoid. That leaves the best period to seven months between August and February.

== Gallery ==
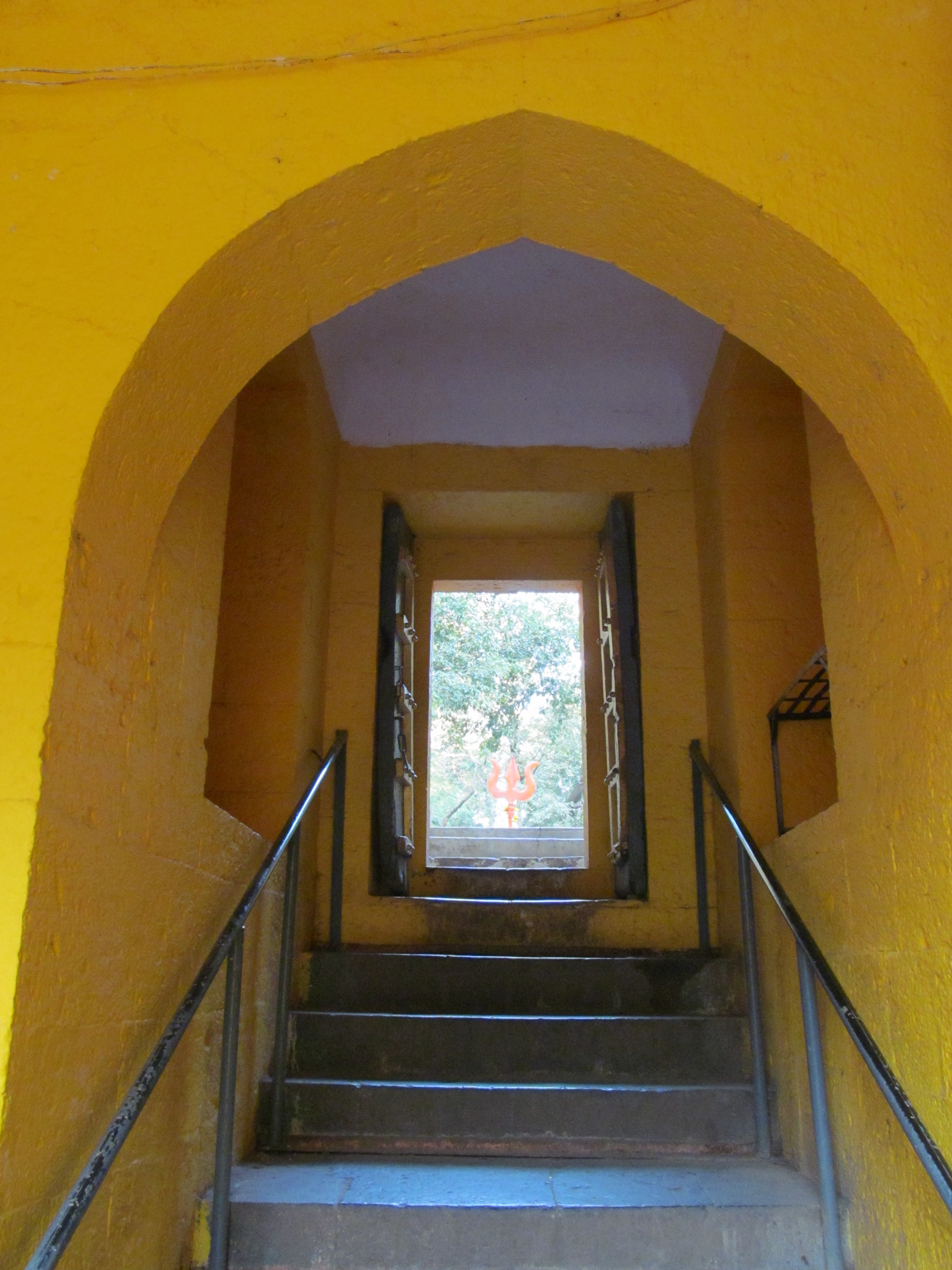
Baneshwar Temple Entrance

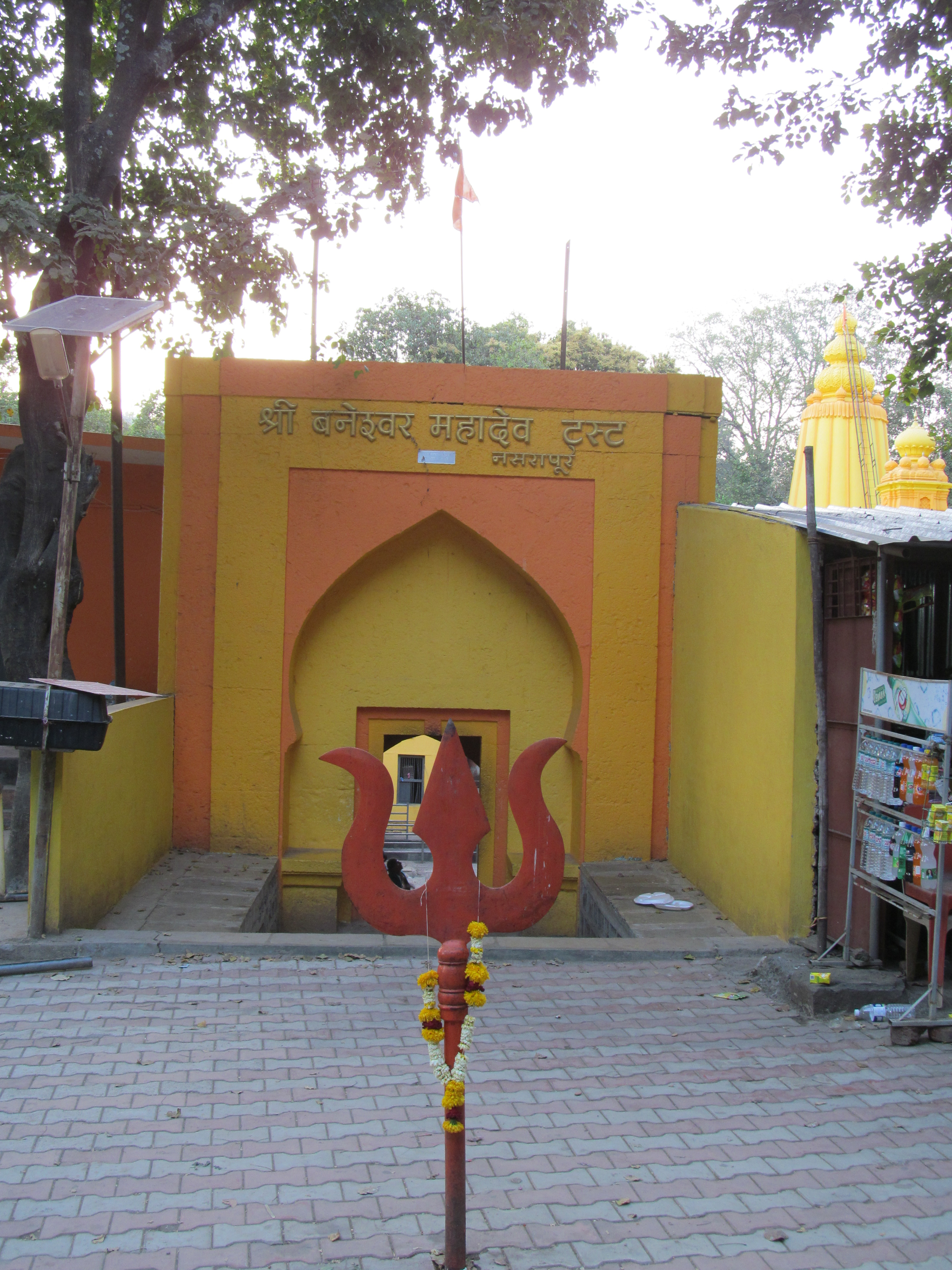
Baneshwar Temple Entrance

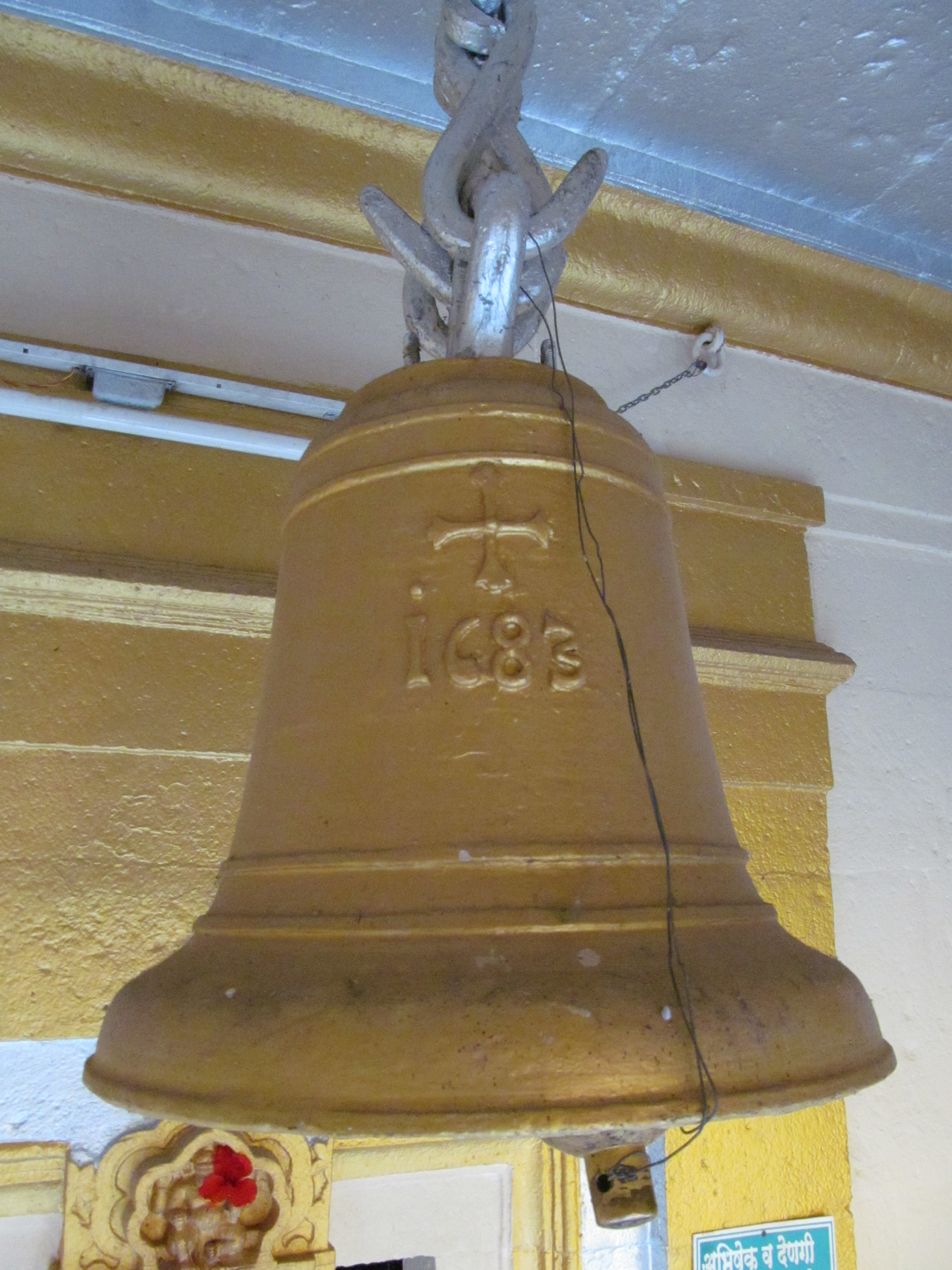
Bell at Baneshwar Temple

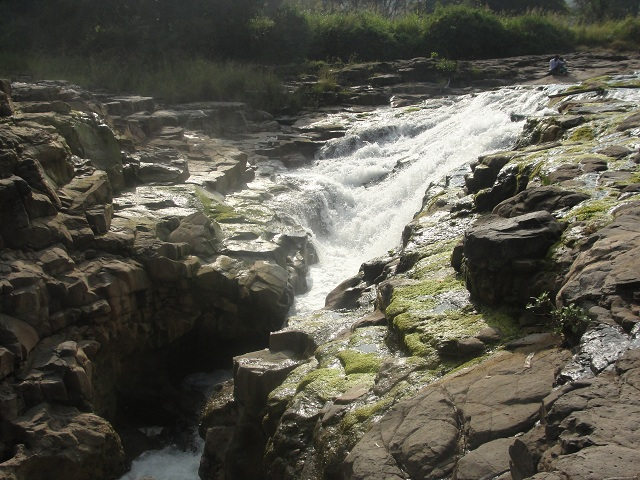
Baneshwar Waterfall

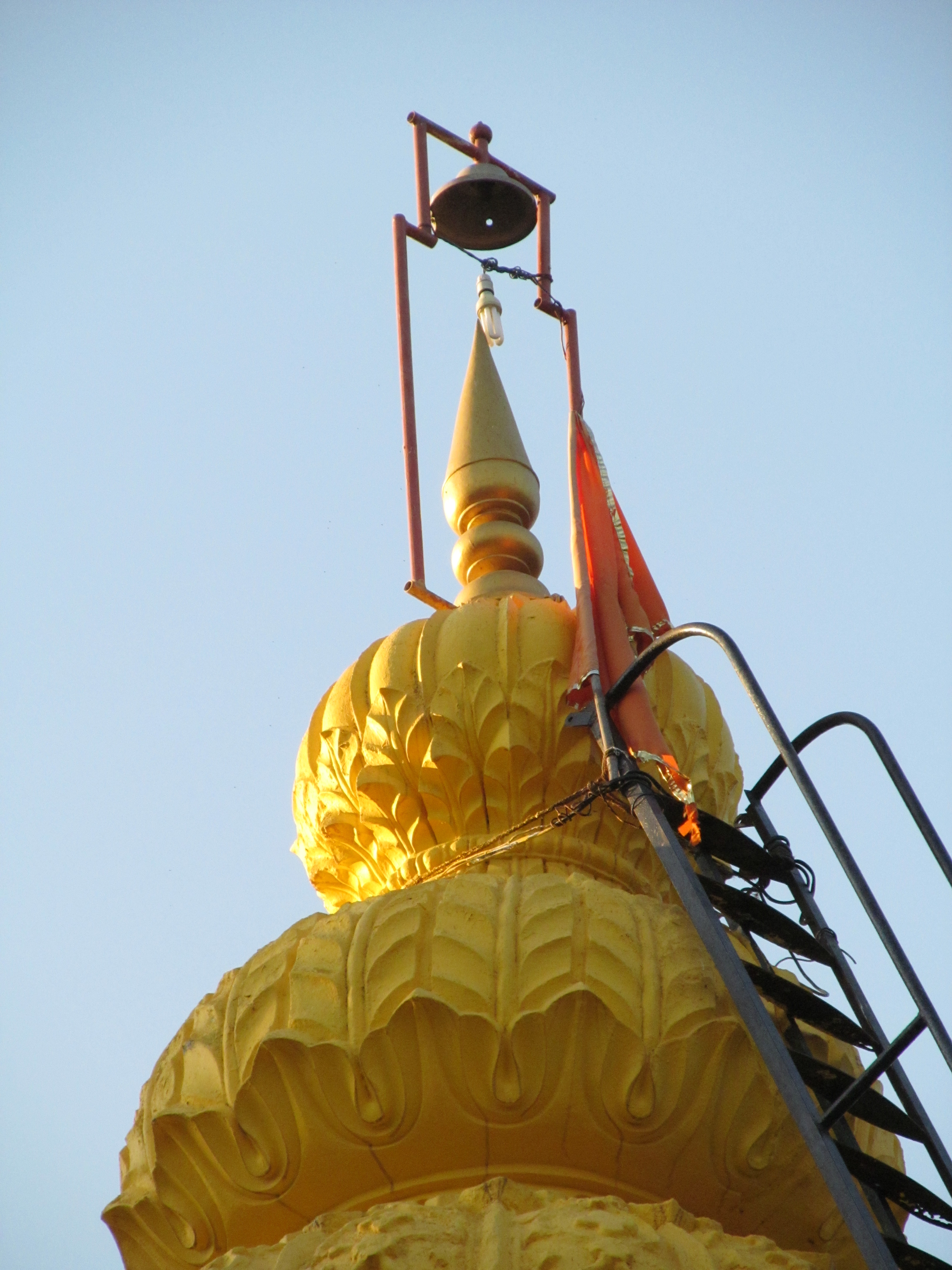
Baneshwar Temple

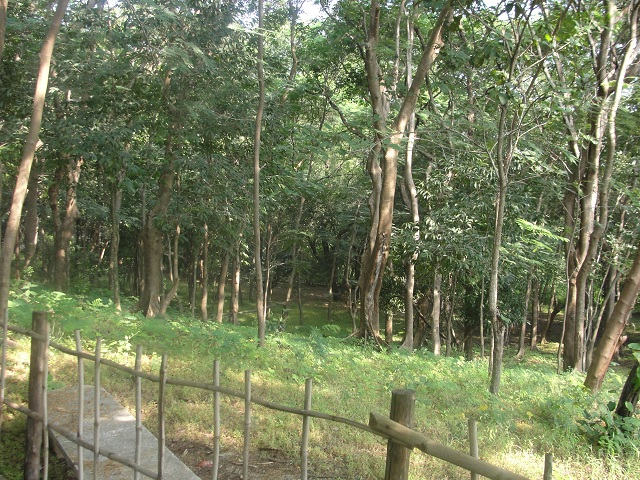
Baneshwar Jungle around the temple

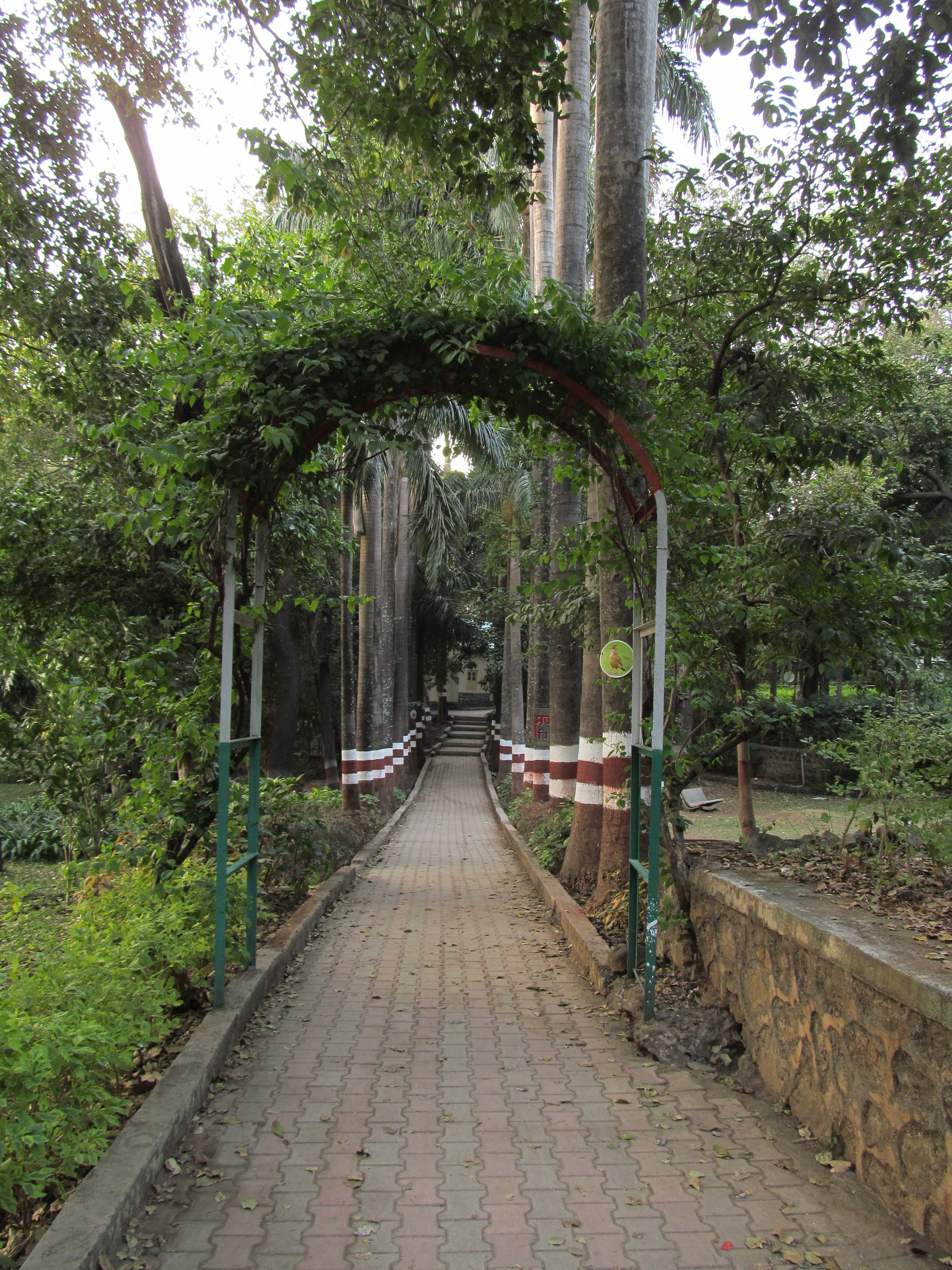
Baneshwar Garden

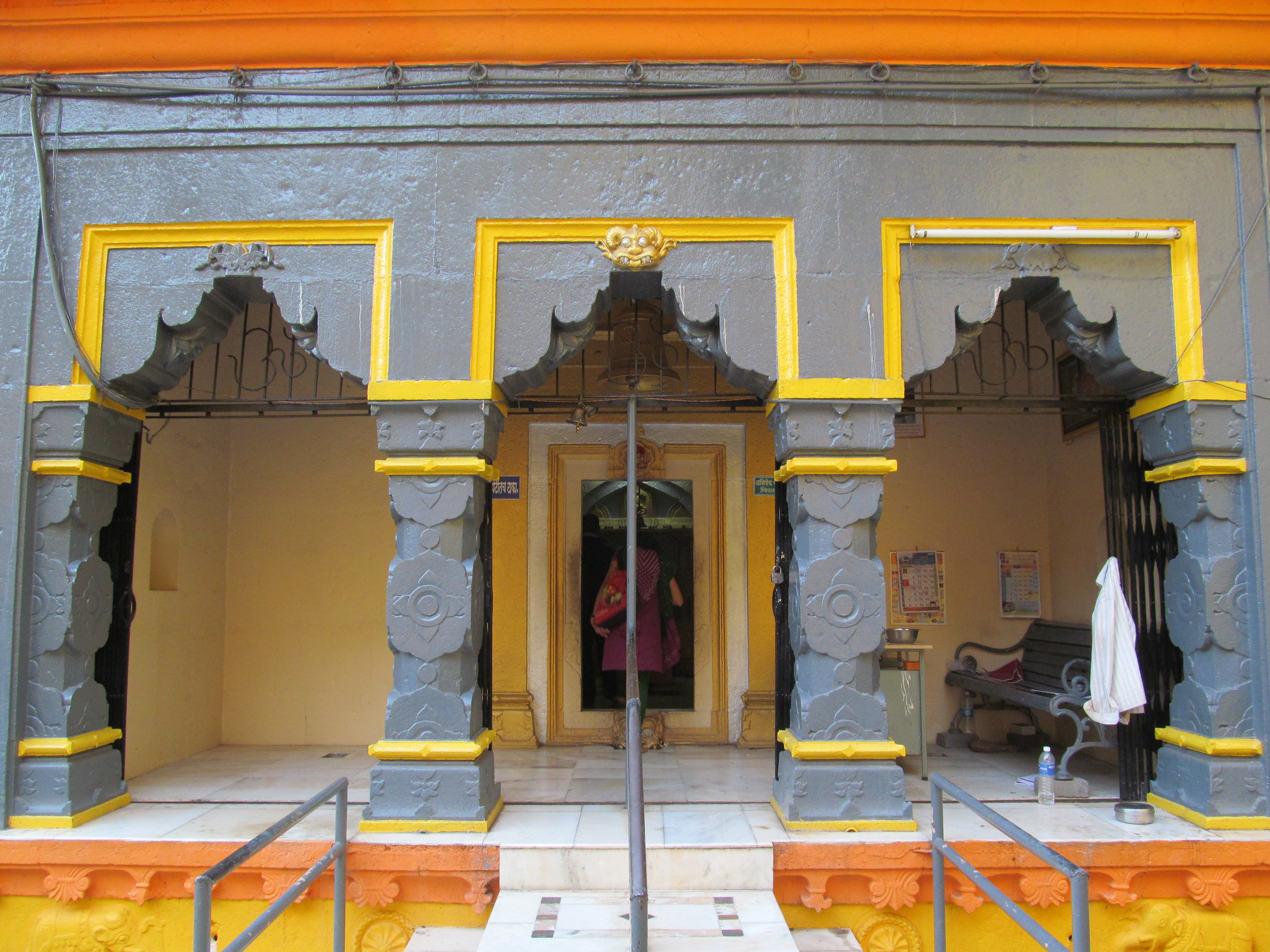
Baneshwar Temple Entrance
