= Garhi, Karauli =

Garhi
- Village
- Location in Rajasthan, India Garhi (India)
- Coordinates: 26°48′21″N 76°47′27″E
- Country: India
- State: Rajasthan
- District: Banswara
- subdivision: Hindaun

Population (2011)
  - Total: 667

Languages
  - Official: Hindi
- Time zone: UTC+5:30 (IST)
- ISO 3166 code: RJ-IN
- Vehicle registration: RJ-
- Coastline: 0 kilometres (0 mi)

Garhi is a small village in Banswara District of Rajasthan.
