= Jaikrishn Patel =

Indian politician

Member of Rajasthan Legislative Assembly
- Incumbent
- Assumed office 4 June 2024
- Preceded by: Mahendrajeet Singh Malviya
- Constituency: Bagidora

Personal details
- Born: 5 July 1987 (age 38)
- Party: Bharat Adivasi Party

Jaikrishn Patel (born 5 July 1987) is an Indian politician currently serving as the 16th Member of the Rajasthan Legislative Assembly. He represents Bagidora. He is a Member of the Bharat Adivasi Party.
