= Dungarpur, Rajasthan =

Dungarpur
- City
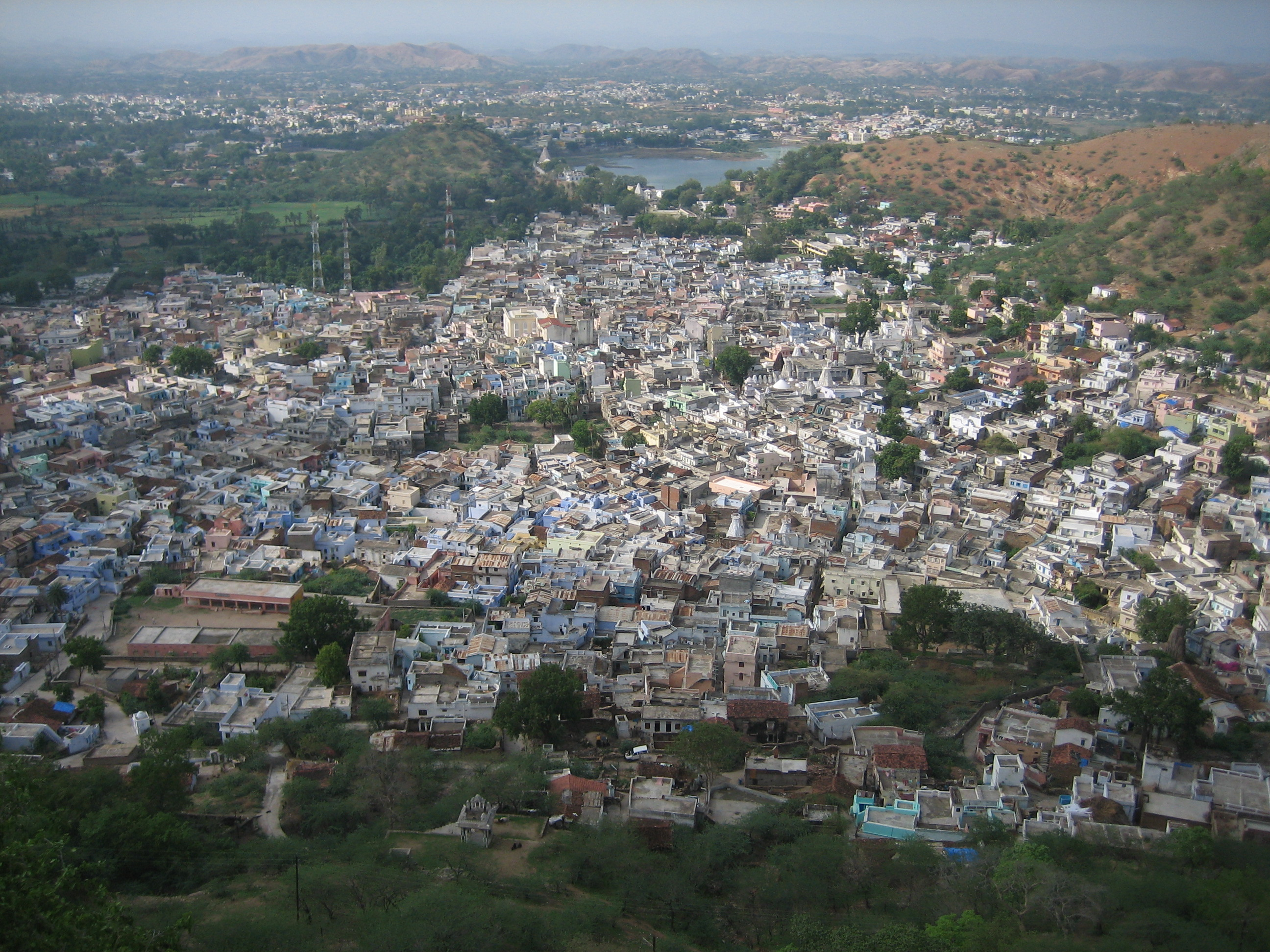
- Aerial view of Dungarpur

- Location in Rajasthan, India Dungarpur (India)
- Coordinates: 23.84°N 73.72°E
- Country: India
- State: Rajasthan
- District: Dungarpur
- Established: 1358
- Founder: King Dungar Singh
- Named for

Government
  - Body: Dungarpur Munciple Council
- Elevation: 225 m (738 ft)

Population (2011)
  - Total: 47,706

Languages
  - Official: Hindi
  - Spoken: Vagdi
- Time zone: UTC+5:30 (IST)
- Postal code: 314001
- Telephone code: 02964 ******
- Vehicle registration: RJ-12
- Sex ratio: 1:1 ♂/♀
- Website: dungarpur.rajasthan.gov.in

Dungarpur is a city and a Municipality in the southernmost district in Rajasthan, India. Dungarpur is the headquarter of Dungarpur District.

== History ==
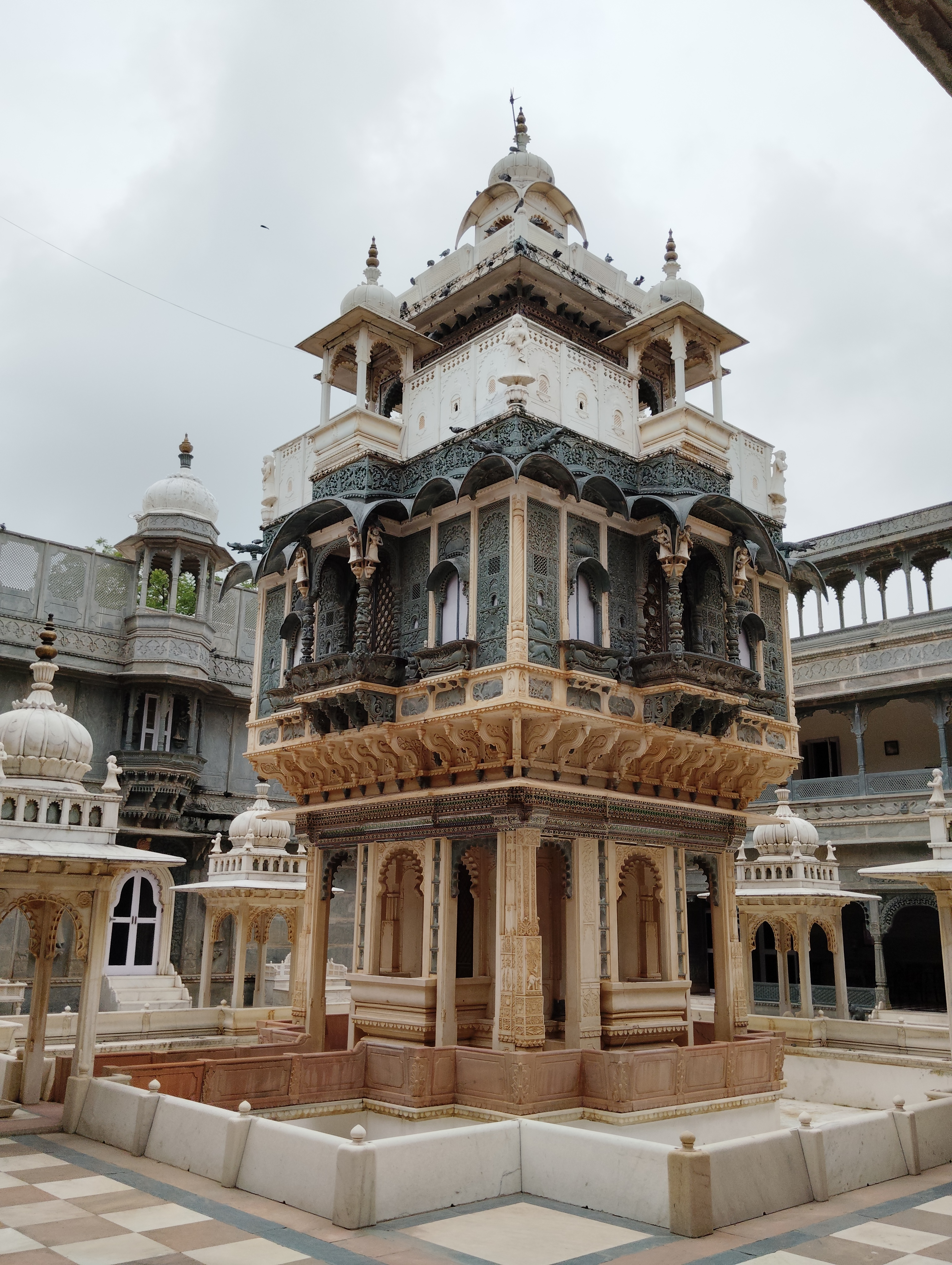
Ek Khambhia Mahal, in Udai Bilas Palace

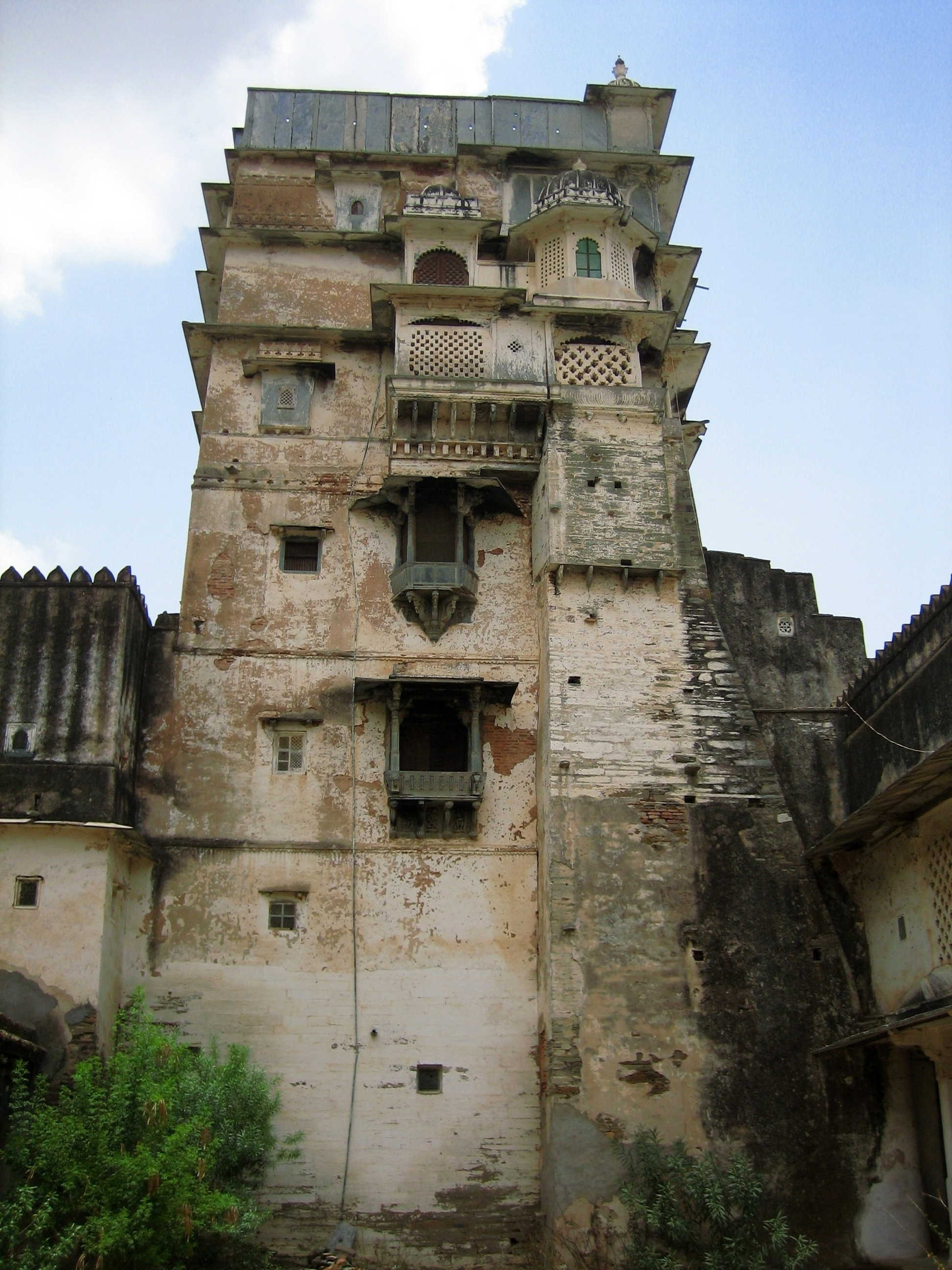
Haveli Juna Mahal, Dungarpur

Dungarpur is the seat of the elder branch of the Guhilot of Mewar family. The seat of the younger branch is that of the Maharana of Udaipur. The city was founded in 1282 A.D. by Rawal Veer Singh, who was the eldest son of the ruler of Mewar, Karan Singh. They are descendants of Bappa Rawal, eighth ruler of the Guhilot dynasty and founder of the Mewar dynasty (r. 734–753).

The chiefs of Dungarpur bear the title of Maharawal as they are descendants of Mahup, the eldest son of Karan Singh, the chief of Mewar in the 12th century, and claim the honors of the elder line of Mewar. Mahup, disinherited by his father, took refuge with his mother's family, the Chauhans of Bagar and made himself lord of that country at the expense of the Bhil chiefs. His younger brother, Rahup, founded a separate Sisodia dynasty.

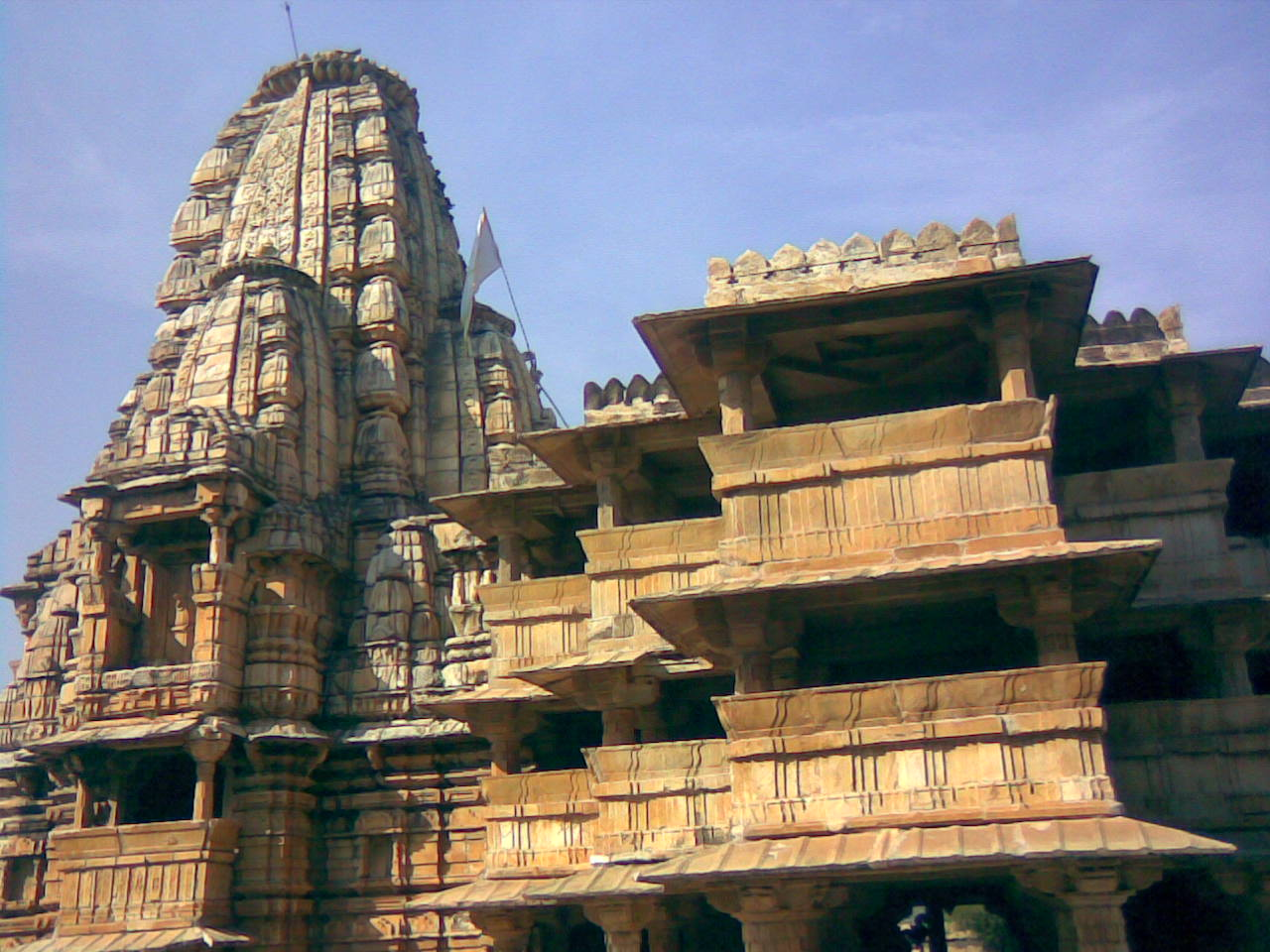
Temple Dev Somnath

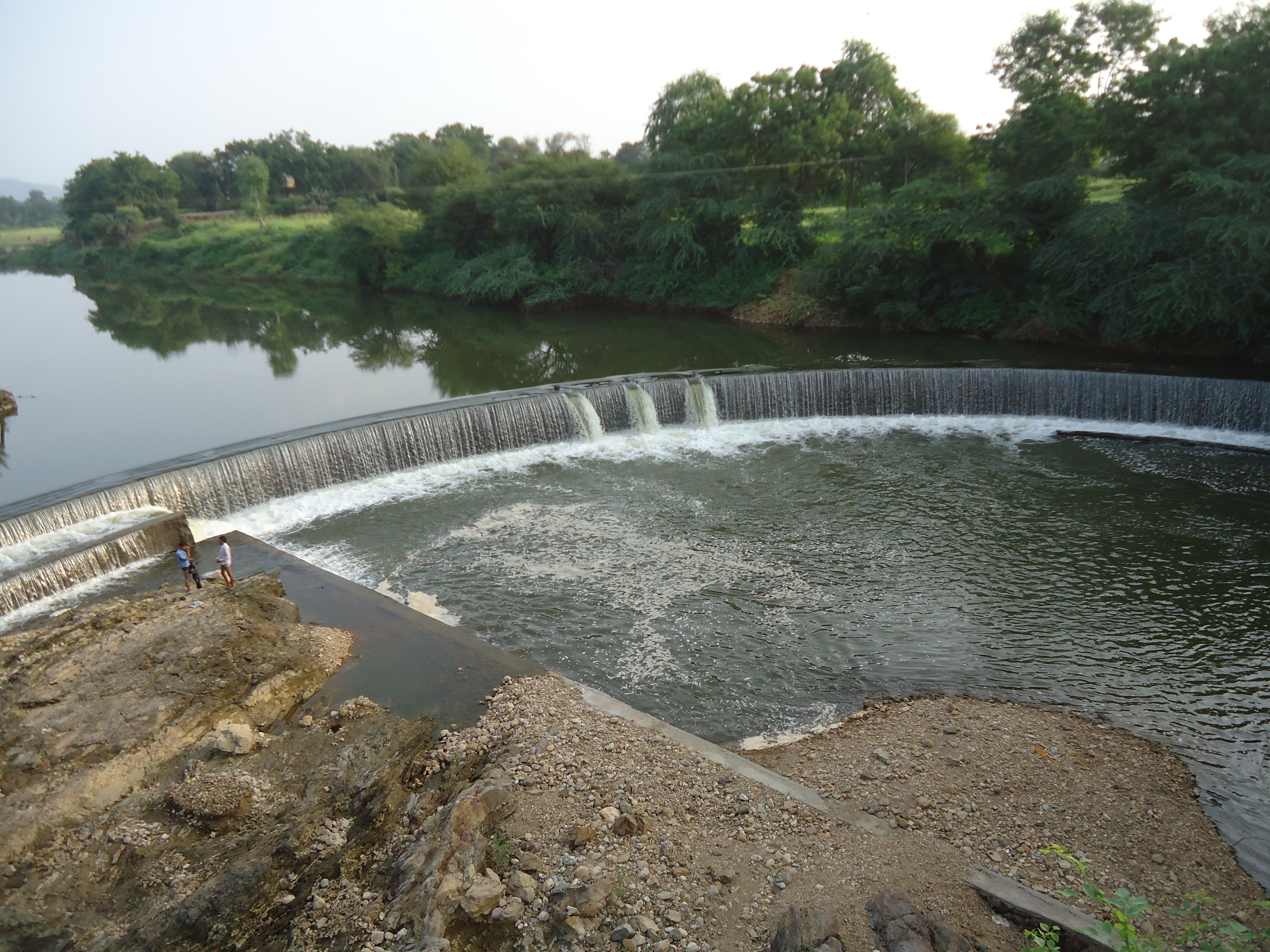
Two River Bridge, Dungarpur

The town of Dungarpur, the capital of the state, was founded near the end of the 14th century by Rawal Bir Singh, the sixth descendant of Sawant Singh of Mewar, who named it after Dungaria, an independent Bhil chieftain who was assassinated. After the death of Rawal Udai Singh of Bagar at the Battle of Khanwa in 1527, where he fought alongside Rana Sanga against Babar, his territories were divided into the states of Dungarpur and Banswara. Successively under Mughal, Maratha and British Raj control by treaty in 1818, it remained a 15-gun salute state.

In 1901, the total population of Dungarpur was 100,103, while that of the town was 6094. The last princely ruler of Dungarpur was Rai-i-Rayan Maharawal Shri Lakshman Singh Bahadur (1918–1989), who was awarded the KCSI (1935) and GCIE (1947), and after independence became a Member of the Rajya Sabha twice, in 1952 and 1958, and later a member of Rajasthan Legislative Assembly (MLA) in 1962 and 1989.

== Demographics ==
As of 2011 India census, Dungarpur had a population of 47,706 people. The population consists of 52% males and 48% females. Dungarpur has an average literacy rate of 59.5%. The male literacy rate is 72.9%, and the female literacy rate is 46.2%. In Dungarpur, 13% of the population is under 6 years of age.

Religions in Dungarpur
Religion	Percent
Hindus	65.43%
Muslims	34.36%
Others	0.21%

== Climate ==
The climate of Dungarpur is quite dry. The summer season is hot, but milder than most of the other Rajasthan cities. The average temperature in summer falls in the range of 43 °C (max) to 26 °C (min). The winter season is fairly cool. The average temperature ranges between 25 °C (max) to 9 °C (min). The average annual rainfall for Dungarpur hovers between 47 cm to 76 cm. The mean temperature in Durgapur is 23 °C in November with a humidity of 68%.

== Places of worship ==
- Shrinathji Temple
- 770 Years old Shree Gambhira Parshvanatha Śvetāmbara Jain Temple, Dungarpur

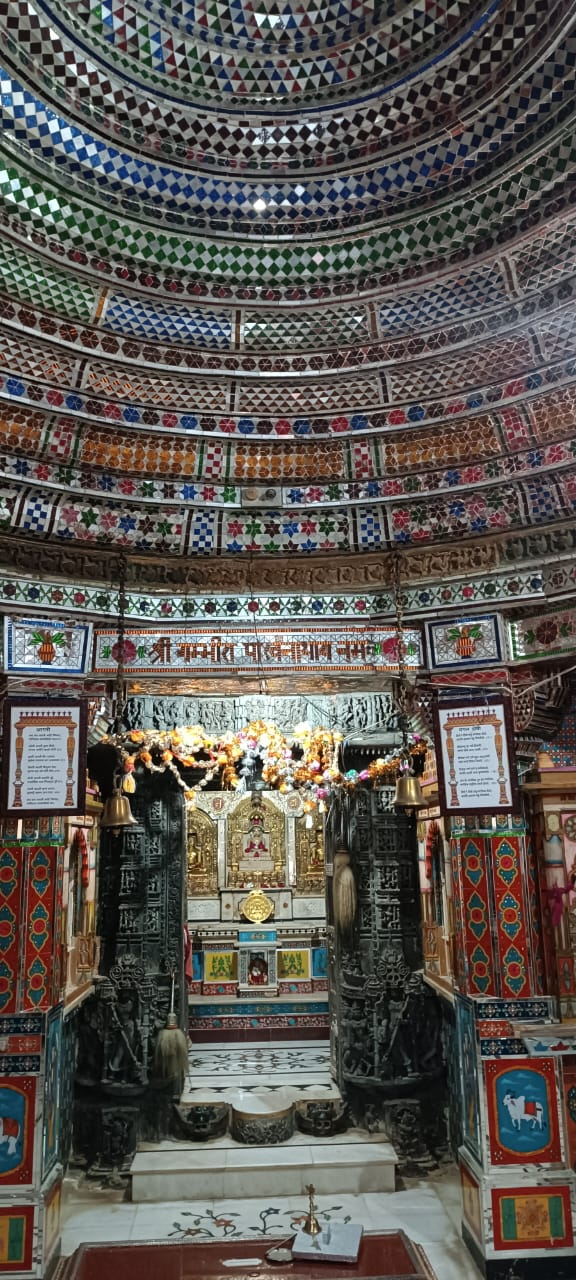
Shree Gambhira Parshvanatha Śvetāmbara Jain Temple, Dungarpur

== Fairs and festivals ==
- Baneshwar fair

== Notable people ==
- Raj Singh Dungarpur, Cricketer, Administrator
- Maharawal Shri Laxman Singh
- Harshvardhan Singh Dungarpur, Rajya Sabha MP from Bharatiya Janata Party and his daughter, Trishika Kumari Devi is married to Yaduveera Krishnadatta Chamaraja Wadiyar, titular head of Mysore royal family
- Nagendra Singh, President International Court of Justice
- Lt. General Nathu Singh Rathore
- Bhogilal Pandya
- Gajraj Rao
