= Jeetmal Khant =

Indian politician (1963–2021)

Member of the Rajasthan Legislative Assembly
- In office 2013–2018
- Preceded by: Kailash Meena
- Succeeded by: Mahendrajeet Singh Malviya
- Constituency: Garhi

Personal details
- Born: 1 January 1963 Thali Talai, Banswara, Rajasthan
- Died: 24 May 2021 (aged 58) Udaipur, Rajasthan
- Party: Bharatiya Janata Party
- Occupation: Politician

Jeetmal Khant (1 January 1963 – 24 May 2021) was an Indian politician from the Bharatiya Janata Party.

== Biography ==
He was a member of the Rajasthan Legislative Assembly representing the Garhi Vidhan Sabha constituency of Rajasthan.

Khant died from COVID-19.
