= Bhogilal Pandya =

Indian freedom fighter (1904–1981)

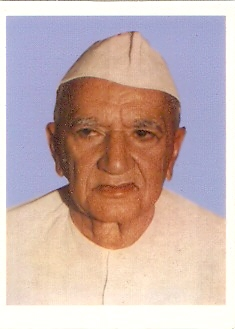
- Born: 13 November 1904; Silmalwara, Dungarpur district, British India
- Died: 31 March 1981 (aged 76)
- Occupation: social worker
- Spouse: Maniben

Bhogilal Pandya (1904–1981) was a freedom fighter and social worker from Dungarpur in the Indian state of Rajasthan. On 3 April 1976, the Government of India awarded him the Padma Bhushan for his social services. The Padma Bhushan is the third-highest civilian award in the Republic of India, given for distinguished service to the nation.

In 1938, Pandya was elected President of Seva-sangh, an organisation that engages in community service in the Dungarpur, Udaipur, Jaipur and Jaisalmar regions of Rajasthan. Through this organisation, Pandya provided community leadership and championed the cause for education of poor village students and gaining rights for and improving the lives of the depressed tribal Bhil people. After India gained its independence in 1948, Pandya was appointed to ministerial positions in the State government. Between 1948 and 1956 he was industrial minister and minister of temples. Between 1969 and 1977, he held the post of Chairman of Khadi Board of Rajasthan.
