= Tarachand Bhagora =

Indian politician

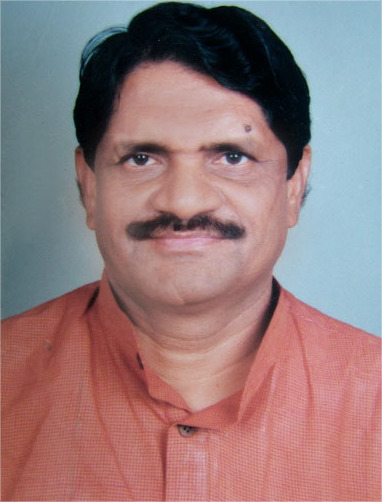

Member: 11th Lok Sabha, 13th Lok Sabha, 15th Lok Sabha
- Constituency: Banswara, Rajasthan

Personal details
- Born: 1 January 1954 (age 72) Ratanpura, Dungarpur District, Rajasthan
- Party: Indian National Congress
- As of 15 August, 2012

Tarachand Bhagora is an Indian politician belonging to the Indian National Congress. He was elected to the Lok Sabha, the lower house of the Parliament of India from Banswara, Rajasthan in 1996, 1999 and 2009.
