= Bharmour Assembly constituency =

Legislative Assembly constituency in Himachal Pradesh State, India

Coordinates: 32.44°N 76.53°E

Bharmour
- Constituency No. 2 for the Himachal Pradesh Legislative Assembly

Constituency details
- Country: India
- Region: North India
- State: Himachal Pradesh
- District: Chamba
- Lok Sabha constituency: Mandi
- Established: 1951
- Total electors: 79,000
- Reservation: ST

Member of Legislative Assembly
- 14th Himachal Pradesh Legislative Assembly
- Incumbent Janak Raj
- Party: Bharatiya Janata Party
- Elected year: 2022

Bharmour is one of the 68 constituencies in the Himachal Pradesh Legislative Assembly of Himachal Pradesh a northern state of India. Bharmour is also part of Mandi Lok Sabha constituency.

== Members of the Legislative Assembly ==
Year	Member	Picture	Party
1951	Gurditta Mal		Indian National Congress
1967	R.Chand		Swatantra Party
1972	Shiri Ram		Indian National Congress
1977	Ram Chand		Janata Party
1982	Thakur Singh Bharmouri		Indian National Congress
1985	Thakur Singh Bharmouri		Indian National Congress
1990	Tulsi Ram		Bharatiya Janata Party
1993	Thakur Singh Bharmouri		Independent
1998	Tulsi Ram		Bharatiya Janata Party
2003	Thakur Singh Bharmouri		Indian National Congress
2007	Tulsi Ram		Bharatiya Janata Party
2012	Thakur Singh Bharmouri		Indian National Congress
2017	Jia Lal		Bharatiya Janata Party
2022	Janak Raj		Bharatiya Janata Party

== Election results ==
=== Assembly Election 2022 ===
2022 Himachal Pradesh Legislative Assembly election: Bharmour
Party	Candidate	Votes	%	±%
BJP	Dr. Janak Raj	30,336	53.68%	▲4.54
INC	Thakur Singh	25,164	44.53%	▲9.41
NOTA	Nota	343	0.61%	▼0.77
Margin of victory		5,172	9.15%	▼4.88
Turnout		56,509	71.53%	▼1.86
Registered electors		79,000		▲10.68
BJP hold		Swing	▲4.54	

=== Assembly Election 2017 ===
2017 Himachal Pradesh Legislative Assembly election: Bharmour
Party	Candidate	Votes	%	±%
BJP	Jia Lal	25,744	49.15%	▲5.05
INC	Thakur Singh	18,395	35.12%	▼16.16
Independent	Lalit Thakur	6,255	11.94%	New
Independent	Janam Singh	769	1.47%	New
NOTA	None of the Above	723	1.38%	New
Margin of victory		7,349	14.03%	▲6.85
Turnout		52,383	73.39%	▼2.37
Registered electors		71,374		▲12.03
BJP gain from INC		Swing	▼2.13	

=== Assembly Election 2012 ===
2012 Himachal Pradesh Legislative Assembly election: Bharmour
Party	Candidate	Votes	%	±%
INC	Thakur Singh	24,751	51.28%	▲3.19
BJP	Jia Lal	21,284	44.09%	▼4.03
Independent	Mahinder Singh	893	1.85%	New
BSP	Kishori Lal	817	1.69%	▲0.23
NCP	Madan Lal Baryal	454	0.94%	New
Margin of victory		3,467	7.18%	▲7.14
Turnout		48,270	75.77%	▲6.39
Registered electors		63,710		▲15.47
INC gain from BJP		Swing	▲3.15	

=== Assembly Election 2007 ===
2007 Himachal Pradesh Legislative Assembly election: Bharmour
Party	Candidate	Votes	%	±%
BJP	Tulsi Ram	18,420	48.12%	▲13.83
INC	Thakur Singh	18,404	48.08%	▼13.50
BSP	Balbir Kumar	559	1.46%	New
Independent	Munish Kumar	536	1.40%	New
Independent	Chandu Lal	346	0.90%	New
Margin of victory		16	0.04%	▼27.25
Turnout		38,276	69.37%	▼4.15
Registered electors		55,174		▲14.24
BJP gain from INC		Swing	▼13.46	

=== Assembly Election 2003 ===
2003 Himachal Pradesh Legislative Assembly election: Bharmour
Party	Candidate	Votes	%	±%
INC	Thakur Singh	21,869	61.58%	▲21.47
BJP	Tulsi Ram	12,177	34.29%	▼18.35
HVC	Kartar Singh	626	1.76%	▲1.03
SP	Ram Prasad	468	1.32%	New
Independent	Ex.Sub.Jaram Singh	371	1.04%	New
Margin of victory		9,692	27.29%	▲14.76
Turnout		35,511	73.56%	▲0.80
Registered electors		48,298		▲15.09
INC gain from BJP		Swing	▲8.94	

=== Assembly Election 1998 ===
1998 Himachal Pradesh Legislative Assembly election: Bharmour
Party	Candidate	Votes	%	±%
BJP	Tulsi Ram	16,068	52.65%	▲15.39
INC	Thakur Singh	12,244	40.12%	▲22.65
Shivsena	Lalit Kumar	1,241	4.07%	New
Independent	Prem Lal Thakur	745	2.44%	New
HVC	Kartar Singh	223	0.73%	New
Margin of victory		3,824	12.53%	▲7.21
Turnout		30,521	73.76%	▲11.91
Registered electors		41,965		▲6.28
BJP gain from Independent		Swing	▲10.07	

=== Assembly Election 1993 ===
1993 Himachal Pradesh Legislative Assembly election: Bharmour
Party	Candidate	Votes	%	±%
Independent	Thakur Singh	10,225	42.58%	New
BJP	Tulsi Ram	8,948	37.26%	▼25.58
INC	Brahmanand	4,194	17.46%	▼14.92
Independent	Laxhmi Chad Thakur	298	1.24%	New
Independent	Dhaniram	178	0.74%	New
JD	Sunita Thakur	172	0.72%	New
Margin of victory		1,277	5.32%	▼25.13
Turnout		24,015	61.51%	▼7.11
Registered electors		39,486		▲7.16
Independent gain from BJP		Swing	▼20.26	

=== Assembly Election 1990 ===
1990 Himachal Pradesh Legislative Assembly election: Bharmour
Party	Candidate	Votes	%	±%
BJP	Tulsi Ram	15,727	62.84%	▲25.73
INC	Thakur Singh	8,106	32.39%	▼24.03
CPI	Parshotam Kumar Attar	709	2.83%	▼1.30
Doordarshi Party	Jigri	466	1.86%	New
Margin of victory		7,621	30.45%	▲11.14
Turnout		25,029	68.71%	▲2.06
Registered electors		36,846		▲28.08
BJP gain from INC		Swing	▲6.42	

=== Assembly Election 1985 ===
1985 Himachal Pradesh Legislative Assembly election: Bharmour
Party	Candidate	Votes	%	±%
INC	Thakur Singh	10,689	56.41%	▲16.49
BJP	Tulsi Ram	7,030	37.10%	▲22.04
CPI	Parshotam Kumar Attar	783	4.13%	New
JP	Ram Chand	308	1.63%	New
Independent	Ram Charan	138	0.73%	New
Margin of victory		3,659	19.31%	▲9.39
Turnout		18,948	68.33%	▲0.70
Registered electors		28,768		▲2.73
INC hold		Swing	▲16.49	

=== Assembly Election 1982 ===
1982 Himachal Pradesh Legislative Assembly election: Bharmour
Party	Candidate	Votes	%	±%
INC	Thakur Singh	7,285	39.92%	▲33.76
Independent	Ram Charan	5,474	29.99%	New
BJP	Bansi Dhar	2,749	15.06%	New
Independent	Tulsi Ram	2,600	14.25%	New
LKD	Bhaim Sain	142	0.78%	New
Margin of victory		1,811	9.92%	▼17.11
Turnout		18,250	66.14%	▲16.72
Registered electors		28,004		▲10.48
INC gain from JP		Swing	▼18.90	

=== Assembly Election 1977 ===
1977 Himachal Pradesh Legislative Assembly election: Bharmour
Party	Candidate	Votes	%	±%
JP	Ram Chand	7,223	58.82%	New
Independent	Thakur Singh	3,903	31.78%	New
INC	Siri Ram	756	6.16%	▼79.16
Independent	Dhani Ram	398	3.24%	New
Margin of victory		3,320	27.04%	▼46.93
Turnout		12,280	51.14%	▼4.68
Registered electors		25,347		▲34.31
JP gain from INC		Swing	▼26.50	

=== Assembly Election 1972 ===
1972 Himachal Pradesh Legislative Assembly election: Bharmour
Party	Candidate	Votes	%	±%
INC	Shiri Ram	8,554	85.32%	▲48.06
LRP	Ram Chand	1,138	11.35%	New
Independent	Daulat Ram	334	3.33%	New
Margin of victory		7,416	73.97%	▲72.94
Turnout		10,026	53.15%	▲7.18
Registered electors		18,872		▼9.32
INC gain from SWA		Swing	▲47.04	

=== Assembly Election 1967 ===
1967 Himachal Pradesh Legislative Assembly election: Bharmour
Party	Candidate	Votes	%	±%
SWA	R. Chand	3,661	38.28%	New
INC	S. Ram	3,563	37.26%	▲4.43
Independent	D. Ram	2,339	24.46%	New
Margin of victory		98	1.02%	▼17.93
Turnout		9,563	45.96%	▲34.50
Registered electors		20,812		▲30.12
SWA gain from Independent		Swing	▼13.49	

=== Assembly Election 1952 ===
1952 Himachal Pradesh Legislative Assembly election: Bharmour
Party	Candidate	Votes	%	±%
Independent	Gurditta Mal	948	51.77%	New
INC	Satya Parshad	601	32.82%	New
KMPP	Devi Chand	141	7.70%	New
Independent	Hans Raj	141	7.70%	New
Margin of victory		347	18.95%	
Turnout		1,831	11.45%	
Registered electors		15,995		
Independent win (new seat)				

== See also ==
- Bharmour
- Chamba district
- List of constituencies of Himachal Pradesh Legislative Assembly
