= Mandi Lok Sabha constituency =

Lok Sabha constituency in Himachal Pradesh

Coordinates: 31.7°N 76.9°E

Mandi HP-2
- Lok Sabha constituency
- Mandi Lok Sabha constituency within Himachal Pradesh

Constituency details
- Country: India
- Region: North India
- State: Himachal Pradesh
- Assembly constituencies: 17: Kinnaur, Bharmour, Lahaul & Spiti, Manali, Kullu, Banjar, Anni, Karsog, Sundernagar, Nachan, Seraj, Darang, Jogindernagar, Mandi, Balh, Sarkaghat and Rampur
- Established: 1952
- Reservation: None

Member of Parliament
- 18th Lok Sabha
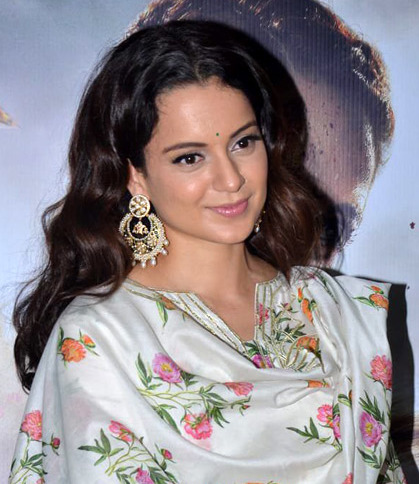
- Incumbent Kangana Ranaut
- Party: BJP
- Alliance: NDA
- Elected year: 2024

Mandi Lok Sabha constituency is one of the four Lok Sabha (parliamentary) constituencies in Himachal Pradesh state in northern India represented by Kangana Ranaut, a member of the Bharatiya Janata Party since 2024.

== History ==
Mandi Parliamentary constituency already emerged as a hot bed of politics where not only the BJP and the Congress will fight for their prestige, but is the only seat in the state where the Left front has popped up a candidate. The constituency then was named as Mandi - Mahasu was represented by Rani Amrit Kaur of the erstwhile Patiala state and Sh Gopi Ram Mandi during 1952–57. In the Lok Sabha elections that followed in 1957, the seat was represented by Raja Joginder Sen of the erstwhile Mandi state, who represented the seat till 1962. In the following elections that year Raja Lalit Sen of Sundarnagar or the erstwhile Suket State was elected. He repeated his victory in the 1967 elections.

However, in period from 1977 to 1979, the constituency was represented by Ganga Singh who represented the Janata Party, which came to power at the centre immediately after the elections that followed the imposition of emergency in the country and the Congress, under Indira Gandhi was routed. He defeated Congress candidate Virbhadra Singh.

Then came along the man, who called himself the son-of-the-soil, Sukh Ram. He switched from state politics to the Parliament and won comfortably in 1985. In the next election, however, it was again another blue-blooded royal, Maheshwar Singh, scion of the erstwhile Kullu state who drubbed the son-of-the-soil at the polls.

But Sukh Ram bounced back and won again in 1994, but was expelled from the Congress a couple of years later, following the reported recovery of large amounts of cash from his residence. To re-establish his political dominion Sukh Ram floated Himachal Vikas Congress and came back into politics with a bang – winning five Assembly seats in 1998 along with wresting Shimla (reserved) parliamentary seat from the Congress in 1999. In 1998, Sukh Ram's HVC under an alliance with the BJP supported the candidature of Maheshwar Singh, who won easily. In 2004, Congress candidate Pratibha Singh defeated Maheshwar Singh. In 2009, Congress candidate Virbhadra Singh defeated Maheshwar Singh by a very small gap.

In 2014 and 2019, Ram Swaroop Sharma of Bharatiya Janata Party was elected.

In 2024, actress Kangana Ranaut, a BJP member was elected.

== Vidhan Sabha segments ==
Mandi Lok Sabha constituency presently comprises the following 17 Vidhan Sabha (legislative assembly) segments:

No	Name	District	Member	Party	2024 Lead	
2	Bharmour (ST)	Chamba	Janak Raj	BJP		BJP
21	Lahaul and Spiti (ST)	Lahaul & Spiti	Anuradha Rana	INC		INC
22	Manali	Kullu	Bhuvaneshwar Gaur	INC		BJP
23	Kullu	Kullu	Surinder Singh Thakur	INC		BJP
24	Banjar	Kullu	Surender Shourie	BJP		BJP
25	Anni (SC)	Kullu	Lokender Kumar	BJP		INC
26	Karsog (SC)	Mandi	Deepraj Kapoor	BJP		BJP
27	Sundernagar	Mandi	Rakesh Jamwal	BJP		BJP
28	Nachan (SC)	Mandi	Vinod Kumar	BJP		BJP
29	Seraj	Mandi	Jai Ram Thakur	BJP		BJP
30	Darang	Mandi	Puran Chand Thakur	BJP		BJP
31	Jogindernagar	Mandi	Prakash Prem Kumar Rana	BJP		BJP
33	Mandi	Mandi	Anil Sharma	BJP		BJP
34	Balh (SC)	Mandi	Inder Singh	BJP		BJP
35	Sarkaghat	Mandi	Dalip Thakur	BJP		BJP
66	Rampur (SC)	Shimla	Vacant		INC	
68	Kinnaur (ST)	Kinnaur	Jagat Singh Negi		INC	INC

== Members of Lok Sabha ==
Year	Name	Party
1952	Gopi Ram	Indian National Congress
1952^	Rajkumari Amrit Kaur	Indian National Congress
1957	Raja Joginder Sen Bahadur	Indian National Congress
1962	Lalit Sen	Indian National Congress
1967	Lalit Sen	Indian National Congress
1971	Virbhadra Singh	Indian National Congress
1977	Ganga Singh	Janata Party
1980	Virbhadra Singh	Indian National Congress
1984	Sukh Ram	Indian National Congress
1989	Maheshwar Singh	Bharatiya Janata Party
1991	Sukh Ram	Indian National Congress
1996	Sukh Ram	Indian National Congress
1998	Maheshwar Singh	Bharatiya Janata Party
1999	Maheshwar Singh	Bharatiya Janata Party
2004	Pratibha Singh	Indian National Congress
2009	Virbhadra Singh	Indian National Congress
2013^	Pratibha Singh	Indian National Congress
2014	Ram Swaroop Sharma	Bharatiya Janata Party
2019	Ram Swaroop Sharma	Bharatiya Janata Party
2021^	Pratibha Singh	Indian National Congress
2024	Kangana Ranaut	Bharatiya Janata Party

== Election results ==
=== 2024 election ===
2024 Indian general election: Mandi
Party	Candidate	Votes	%	±%
BJP	Kangana Ranaut	537,022	52.71	▲4.57
INC	Vikramaditya Singh	462,267	45.51	▼3.63
NOTA	None of the above	5,645	0.56	▼1.12
Majority		74,755	7.36	▲6.36
Turnout		10,18,685	73.97	▲14.17
BJP gain from INC		Swing		

=== 2021 by-election ===
Bye-elections, 2021 : Mandi
Party	Candidate	Votes	%	±%
INC	Pratibha Singh	369,565	49.14	▲23.46
BJP	Brig. Khushal Thakur	362,075	48.14	▼20.61
NOTA	None of the Above	12,661	1.68	▲1.12
Majority		7,490	1.00	▼42.07
Turnout		752,071	57.98	▼15.62
INC gain from BJP		Swing		

=== 2019 election ===
2019 Indian general elections: Mandi
Party	Candidate	Votes	%	±%
BJP	Ram Swaroop Sharma	647,189	68.75	▲18.81
INC	Aashray Sharma	241,730	25.68	▼18.78
CPI(M)	Dilip Singh Kayath	14,838	1.58	▼0.34
BSP	Ses Ram	9,060	0.96	▲0.25
None of the Above	None of the Above	5,298	0.56	▼0.29
Majority		405,459	43.07	▲37.59
Turnout		943,148	73.60	▲10.48
BJP hold		Swing		

=== 2014 election ===
2014 Indian general elections: Mandi
Party	Candidate	Votes	%	±%
BJP	Ram Swaroop Sharma	362,824	49.94	▲12.71
INC	Pratibha Singh	322,968	44.46	▼16.25
CPI(M)	Kushal Bhardwaj	13,965	1.92	New
AAP	Jai Chand Thakur	9,359	1.29	New
BSP	Lala Ram	21,780	3.0	New
NOTA	None of the above	6,191	0.85	N/A
Majority		39,856	5.48	▼18.00
Turnout		726,094	63.12	▲11.33
BJP gain from INC		Swing	▼10.77	

=== 2013 by-election ===
Bye-election, 2013: Mandi
Party	Candidate	Votes	%	±%
INC	Pratibha Singh	353,492	60.71	▲12.89
BJP	Jai Ram Thakur	2,16,765	37.23	▼8.63
Independent	Subhash Mohan Snehi	6,057	1.04	New
PRISM	Lawan Kumar	5,932	1.02	New
Majority		1,36,727	23.48	▲21.52
Turnout		5,82,249	51.80	▼12.29
INC hold		Swing	▲12.89	

=== 2009 election ===
2009 Indian general elections: Mandi
Party	Candidate	Votes	%	±%
INC	Virbhadra Singh	340,973	47.82	▼5.59
BJP	Maheshwar Singh	3,26,976	45.85	▲2.38
CPI(M)	Dr. Onkar Shad	20,664	2.89	New
BSP	Lala Ram	10,131	1.42	▲0.12
RWS	Hookam Chand Shastri	7,877	1.10	New
Independent	Shan Mohammad	6,405	0.89	New
Majority		13,997	1.97	▼7.97
Turnout		7,13,026	64.09	▲1.18
INC hold		Swing		

=== 2004 election ===
General Election, 2004: Mandi
Party	Candidate	Votes	%	±%
INC	Pratibha Singh	357,623	53.41	▲16.30
BJP	Maheshwar Singh	291,057	43.47	▼18.58
BSP	Mohan Lal Sahni	8,671	1.30	New
Independent	Shah Mohammad	8,076	1.21	New
Independent	Kashmir Singh Guleria	4,125	0.62	New
Majority		66,566	9.94	▼15.00
Turnout		669,552	62.91	▲8.35
INC gain from BJP		Swing		

=== 1999 election ===
General Election, 1999: Mandi
Party	Candidate	Votes	%	±%
BJP	Maheshwar Singh	325,929	62.05	▼0.39
INC	Kaul Singh	1,94,904	37.11	▲1.73
NCP	Ravi Thakur	3,657	0.7	New
Independent	Amar Nirgotra	750	0.14	▼0.07
Majority		1,31,025	24.94	▼2.22
Turnout		5,28,636	54.56	
BJP gain from INC		Swing		

=== 1998 election ===
General Election, 1998: Mandi
Party	Candidate	Votes	%	±%
BJP	Maheshwar Singh	304,210	62.44	▲29.15
INC	Pratibha Singh	1,72,378	35.38	▼27.06
	Sukh Ram	8,304	1.70	
SJP(R)	Dina Nath	1,265	0.26	New
Independent	Amar Nirgotra	1,081	0.22	New
Majority		1,31,832	27.06	▲2.09
Turnout		4,90,660		
BJP gain from INC		Swing		

=== 1996 election ===
General Election, 1996: Mandi
Party	Candidate	Votes	%	±%
INC	Sukh Ram	328,186	62.44	
BJP	Adan Singh Thakur	1,74,963	33.29	
SP	Ganga Singh	6,460	1.23	
SS	Subh Ram Thakray	790	0.15	
AIIC(T)	Chandermani Sharma	3,717	0.71	
Independent	Amar Nirgotra	4,608	0.88	
Independent	Kanshi Ram	1,954	0.37	
Independent	Devender Sharma	1049	0.20	
Independent	Bal Krishan	936	0.18	
Independent	Diwan Chand Gupta	768	0.15	
Independent	Ramesh Chand Gautam	739	0.14	
Independent	Jeevan Parkash Sharma	695	0.13	
Independent	Brikam Ram	449	0.09	
Independent	Ramesh Kumar Garla	294	0.06	
Majority		1,53,223	29.15	
Turnout		5,25,608		
INC hold		Swing		

=== 1991 election ===
General Election, 1991: Mandi
Party	Candidate	Votes	%	±%
INC	Sukh Ram	233,380	49.70	
BJP	Maheshwar Singh	2,06,753	44.03	
JD	Karam Singh	18,112	3.86	
SS	Subh Ram Thakray	790	0.15	
Doordarshi Party	Om Prakash	3970	0.85	
JP	Prem Singh Thakur	2,829	0.60	
Independent	Om Dutt Sharma	1,954	0.37	
Independent	Krishan Lal Sharma	1049	0.20	
Independent	Amar Nirogotra	936	0.18	
Independent	Nawal Thakur	768	0.15	
Independent	Gian Chand Paniala	739	0.14	
Independent	Jeevan Parkash Sharma	695	0.13	
Independent	Brikam Ram	449	0.09	
Independent	Ramesh Kumar Garla	294	0.06	
Majority		26,627	5.67	
Turnout		4,72,718		
INC gain from BJP		Swing		

=== 1989 election ===
General Election, 1989: Mandi
Party	Candidate	Votes	%	±%
BJP	Maheshwar Singh	234,164	50.36	
INC	Sukh Ram	2,06,095	44.33	
CPI(M)	D.N. Kapoor	9,736	2.09	
Doordarshi Party	O.M. Prakash	5,510	1.19	
BSP	Dharam Singh	4,489	0.97	
JP	Naval Thaur	3,423	0.74	
Independent	Raj Kumar	1,530	0.33	
Majority		28,069	6.03	
Turnout		4,64,947		
BJP gain from INC		Swing		

=== 1984 election ===
General Election, 1984: Mandi
Party	Candidate	Votes	%	±%
INC	Sukh Ram	224,146	67.52	
BJP	Madhukar Singh	92,495	27.86	
INC(J)	Nand Singh	3,817	1.15	
JP	Het Ram	2,331	0.70	
Independent	Kamal Kishore	2,921	0.88	
Independent	Narpat Ram Chauhan	2,616	0.79	
Independent	Nawal Thakur	2,453	0.74	
Independent	Durga Singh Rathore	1,194	0.36	
Majority		1,31,651	39.66	
Turnout		3,31,973		
INC gain from IC(S)		Swing		

=== 1980 election ===
General Election, 1980: Mandi
Party	Candidate	Votes	%	±%
IC(S)	Virbhadra Singh	166,949	56.60	New
JP	Ganga Singh	1,08,595	36.82	
JP(S)	Bhagat Guru	12,544	4.25	
Independent	Puran Mal	4,626	1.57	
Independent	Naval Thakur	2,255	0.76	
Majority				
Turnout				
IC(S) gain from BLD		Swing		

=== 1977 election ===
General Election, 1977: Mandi
Party	Candidate	Votes	%	±%
JP	Ganga Singh Thakur	138,638	53.52	
INC	Virbhadra Singh	1,02,143	39.19	
CPI(M)	Tara Chand	8,950	3.45	
Independent	Nawal Thakur	7,817	3.01	
Independent	Ani Rudh	2,167	0.83	
Majority				
Turnout				
JP gain from INC		Swing		

=== 1971 election ===
General Election, 1971: Mandi
Party	Candidate	Votes	%	±%
INC	Virbhadra Singh	114,957	71.95	
LRP	Mandhar Lal	25,780	16.14	
INC(O)	Gauri Prashad	6,344	3.97	
Independent	Nawal Thakur	4,914	3.08	
Independent	Mahavr Prashad	4,587	0.87	
Independent	Tulsi Ram	3,182	1.99	
Majority				
Turnout				
INC gain from LRP		Swing		

=== 1967 election ===
General Election, 1967: Mandi
Party	Candidate	Votes	%	±%
INC	Lalit Sen	62,596	51.65	
Independent	I. Singh	28,331	23.38	
Independent	D.S.Ram	26,877	22.18	
Independent	N.D. Joshi	3,377	2.79	
Majority				
Turnout				
INC gain from		Swing		

=== 1962 election ===
General Election, 1962: Mandi
Party	Candidate	Votes	%	±%
INC	Lalit Sen	46,856	63.56	
SWA	Ambika Kumari	20,600	27.95	
ABJS	Kuldip Singh	2,742	3.72	
Independent	Tej Singh	3,516	4.77	
Majority				
Turnout				
INC gain from SWA		Swing		

=== 1957 election ===
General Election, 1957: Mandi
Party	Candidate	Votes	%	±%
INC	Joginder Sen	57,530	63.47	
Independent	Anand Chand	33,110	36.53	
Majority				
Turnout				
INC hold		Swing		

=== 1951 election ===
General Election, 1951: Mandi
Party	Candidate	Votes	%	±%
INC	Amrit Kaur	47,152	26.89	
INC	Gopi Ram	41,433	26.63	
KMPP	Tej Singh	19,872	11.33	
SCF	Anokhi Ram	18,988	10.83	
Socialist	Muni Lal	16,780	9.57	
ABJS	Hari Dutt	12,053	6.87	
Independent	Kahan Singh	19,099	10.89	
Majority				
Turnout				
INC win (new seat)				

== See also ==
- List of constituencies of the Lok Sabha
