= Mandi Assembly constituency =

Legislative Assembly constituency in Himachal Pradesh State, India

Coordinates: 31.71°N 76.94°E

Mandi
- Constituency No. 33 for the Himachal Pradesh Legislative Assembly

Constituency details
- Country: India
- Region: North India
- State: Himachal Pradesh
- District: Mandi
- Lok Sabha constituency: Mandi
- Established: 1967
- Total electors: 78,113
- Reservation: None

Member of Legislative Assembly
- 14th Himachal Pradesh Legislative Assembly
- Incumbent Anil Sharma
- Party: Bharatiya Janata Party
- Elected year: 2022

Mandi Assembly constituency is one of the 68 constituencies of the Himachal Pradesh Vidhan Sabha. This constituency is not reserved for the candidates belonging to Scheduled castes or Scheduled Tribes.

== Overview ==
Mandi (constituency number 33) is one of the ten Vidhan Sabha constituencies located in Mandi district. It covers the entire Sadar Mandi tehsil. It is part of Mandi Lok Sabha constituency along with 18 other Assembly segments, namely, Bharmour, Lahaul & Spiti, Manali, Kullu, Banjar, Anni, Karsog, Sundernagar, Nachan, Seraj, Darang, Jogindernagar, Dharampur, Mandi, Balh, Sarkaghat, Rohru and Kinnaur.

== Members of Legislative Assembly ==
Year	Member	Picture	Party
1967	Sukh Ram		Indian National Congress
1972	Sukh Ram		Indian National Congress
1977	Sukh Ram		Indian National Congress
1982	Sukh Ram		Indian National Congress
1985	Durga Dutt		Indian National Congress
1990	Kanhaiya Lal		Bharatiya Janata Party
1993	Anil Sharma		Indian National Congress
1998	Sukh Ram		Himachal Vikas Congress
2003	Sukh Ram		Himachal Vikas Congress
2007	Anil Sharma		Indian National Congress
2012	Anil Sharma		Indian National Congress
2017	Anil Sharma		Bharatiya Janata Party
2022	Anil Sharma		Bharatiya Janata Party

== Election results ==
=== Assembly Election 2022 ===
2022 Himachal Pradesh Legislative Assembly election: Mandi
Party	Candidate	Votes	%	±%
BJP	Anil Sharma	31,303	53.37%	▼3.24
INC	Champa Thakur	21,297	36.31%	▼1.74
Independent	Praveen Sharma	4,106	7.00%	New
AAP	Shyam Lal	559	0.95%	New
NOTA	Nota	448	0.76%	▼0.29
Margin of victory		10,006	17.06%	▼1.50
Turnout		58,650	75.08%	▼4.21
Registered electors		78,113		▲12.11
BJP hold		Swing	▼3.24	

=== Assembly Election 2017 ===
2017 Himachal Pradesh Legislative Assembly election: Mandi
Party	Candidate	Votes	%	±%
BJP	Anil Sharma	31,282	56.62%	▲21.78
INC	Champa Thakur	21,025	38.05%	▼4.87
NOTA	None of the Above	580	1.05%	New
BSP	Narender Kumar	438	0.79%	▼0.58
Margin of victory		10,257	18.56%	▲10.48
Turnout		55,253	79.30%	▲4.36
Registered electors		69,678		▲7.39
BJP gain from INC		Swing	▲13.70	

=== Assembly Election 2012 ===
2012 Himachal Pradesh Legislative Assembly election: Mandi
Party	Candidate	Votes	%	±%
INC	Anil Kumar	20,866	42.92%	▼2.93
BJP	Durga Dutt	16,936	34.83%	▼5.50
Independent	Shyam Lal	3,370	6.93%	New
HLC	Harish Kumar	2,098	4.32%	New
LJP	Krishan Singh	2,081	4.28%	New
CPI	Desh Raj	1,468	3.02%	New
BSP	Chander Mani	667	1.37%	▼7.85
Independent	Hem Singh	443	0.91%	New
Independent	Chet Ram	274	0.56%	New
Margin of victory		3,930	8.08%	▲2.57
Turnout		48,618	74.93%	▲4.75
Registered electors		64,881		▼8.47
INC hold		Swing	▼2.93	

=== Assembly Election 2007 ===
2007 Himachal Pradesh Legislative Assembly election: Mandi
Party	Candidate	Votes	%	±%
INC	Anil Kumar	22,808	45.85%	▲20.96
BJP	Durga Dutt	20,064	40.33%	▲23.59
BSP	Rajinder Mohan	4,590	9.23%	New
Independent	Harish Chander	1,631	3.28%	New
Independent	Kanhiya Lal	316	0.64%	New
Margin of victory		2,744	5.52%	▼21.48
Turnout		49,746	70.18%	▼1.20
Registered electors		70,884		▲10.24
INC gain from HVC		Swing	▼6.04	

=== Assembly Election 2003 ===
2003 Himachal Pradesh Legislative Assembly election: Mandi
Party	Candidate	Votes	%	±%
HVC	Sukh Ram	23,816	51.89%	▼12.74
INC	Durga Dutt	11,426	24.89%	▲9.06
BJP	Kiran Kumari	7,687	16.75%	▼0.05
LHMP	Narender Kumar	2,520	5.49%	New
Independent	Amar Nirgotra	450	0.98%	New
Margin of victory		12,390	26.99%	▼20.84
Turnout		45,899	71.38%	▲2.38
Registered electors		64,299		▲11.77
HVC hold		Swing	▼12.74	

=== Assembly Election 1998 ===
1998 Himachal Pradesh Legislative Assembly election: Mandi
Party	Candidate	Votes	%	±%
HVC	Sukh Ram	25,656	64.63%	New
BJP	Kanhiya Lal	6,667	16.79%	▼13.51
INC	Durga Dutt	6,285	15.83%	▼49.62
BSP	Roshan Lal	1,089	2.74%	▲0.46
Margin of victory		18,989	47.83%	▲12.69
Turnout		39,697	69.37%	▼0.24
Registered electors		57,526		▲12.71
HVC gain from INC		Swing	▼0.83	

=== Assembly Election 1993 ===
1993 Himachal Pradesh Legislative Assembly election: Mandi
Party	Candidate	Votes	%	±%
INC	Anil Sharma	23,134	65.46%	▲31.19
BJP	Kanhiya Lal	10,712	30.31%	▼32.05
BSP	Sant Ram Badhan	806	2.28%	▲0.88
Independent	Ganga Ram	528	1.49%	New
Margin of victory		12,422	35.15%	▲7.05
Turnout		35,343	69.68%	▲2.94
Registered electors		51,038		▲6.95
INC gain from BJP		Swing	▲3.10	

=== Assembly Election 1990 ===
1990 Himachal Pradesh Legislative Assembly election: Mandi
Party	Candidate	Votes	%	±%
BJP	Kanhiya Lal	19,732	62.36%	▲16.81
INC	Durga Dutt	10,842	34.26%	▼16.66
BSP	Sant Ram	443	1.40%	New
Doordarshi Party	Jagroop Singh	308	0.97%	New
Independent	Gopi Ram	263	0.83%	New
Margin of victory		8,890	28.09%	▲22.73
Turnout		31,643	66.92%	▼3.35
Registered electors		47,722		▲39.12
BJP gain from INC		Swing	▲11.44	

=== Assembly Election 1985 ===
1985 Himachal Pradesh Legislative Assembly election: Mandi
Party	Candidate	Votes	%	±%
INC	Durga Dutt	12,166	50.92%	▼3.24
BJP	Kanhiya Lal	10,884	45.55%	▲2.96
CPI	Amar Chand	395	1.65%	New
Independent	Bhagat Singh	216	0.90%	New
Independent	Chander Mani	213	0.89%	New
Margin of victory		1,282	5.37%	▼6.20
Turnout		23,893	70.32%	▼1.03
Registered electors		34,303		▲4.91
INC hold		Swing	▼3.24	

=== Assembly Election 1982 ===
1982 Himachal Pradesh Legislative Assembly election: Mandi
Party	Candidate	Votes	%	±%
INC	Sukh Ram	12,517	54.16%	▼1.42
BJP	Kanhiya Lal	9,845	42.60%	New
Independent	Sant Ram	415	1.80%	New
JP	Khem Singh	289	1.25%	▼30.39
Margin of victory		2,672	11.56%	▼12.38
Turnout		23,112	71.35%	▲7.98
Registered electors		32,696		▼6.22
INC hold		Swing	▼1.42	

=== Assembly Election 1977 ===
1977 Himachal Pradesh Legislative Assembly election: Mandi
Party	Candidate	Votes	%	±%
INC	Sukh Ram	12,150	55.58%	▲0.02
JP	Lila Devi	6,917	31.64%	New
Independent	Amar Chand	2,331	10.66%	New
Independent	Vishwa Nath	463	2.12%	New
Margin of victory		5,233	23.94%	▲8.21
Turnout		21,861	63.43%	▲5.48
Registered electors		34,863		▲2.89
INC hold		Swing	▲0.02	

=== Assembly Election 1972 ===
1972 Himachal Pradesh Legislative Assembly election: Mandi
Party	Candidate	Votes	%	±%
INC	Sukh Ram	10,772	55.56%	▼0.28
Independent	Bhagat Ram	7,722	39.83%	New
Independent	Anant Ram	895	4.62%	New
Margin of victory		3,050	15.73%	▼19.78
Turnout		19,389	58.76%	▲5.19
Registered electors		33,883		▲11.78
INC hold		Swing	▼0.28	

=== Assembly Election 1967 ===
1967 Himachal Pradesh Legislative Assembly election: Mandi
Party	Candidate	Votes	%	±%
INC	S. Ram	8,808	55.84%	▲21.44
Independent	T. Singh	3,207	20.33%	New
Independent	M. Lal	2,834	17.97%	New
Independent	J. Ram	637	4.04%	New
Independent	B. Lal	287	1.82%	New
Margin of victory		5,601	35.51%	▲32.91
Turnout		15,773	54.98%	▲4.33
Registered electors		30,312		▲128.22
INC gain from Independent		Swing	▲18.83	

=== Assembly Election 1952 ===
1952 Himachal Pradesh Legislative Assembly election: Mandi
Party	Candidate	Votes	%	±%
Independent	Krishna Nand Swami	2,345	37.01%	New
INC	Purna Nand	2,180	34.41%	New
ABHM	Gulab Singh	937	14.79%	New
ABJS	Lal Singh	585	9.23%	New
Independent	Ravi Singh	155	2.45%	New
Independent	Sher Singh	134	2.11%	New
Margin of victory		165	2.60%	
Turnout		6,336	47.70%	
Registered electors		13,282		
Independent win (new seat)				

== See also ==
- List of constituencies of the Himachal Pradesh Legislative Assembly
