= Rampur, Himachal Pradesh Assembly constituency =

Constituency of the Himachal Pradesh legislative assembly in India

Coordinates: 31.05°N 77.14°E

Rampur
- Constituency No. 66 for the Himachal Pradesh Legislative Assembly

Constituency details
- Country: India
- Region: North India
- State: Himachal Pradesh
- District: Shimla
- Lok Sabha constituency: Mandi
- Established: 1951
- Total electors: 77,215
- Reservation: SC

Member of Legislative Assembly
- 14th Himachal Pradesh Legislative Assembly
- Incumbent Vacant

Rampur is one of the 68 constituencies in the Himachal Pradesh Legislative Assembly of Himachal Pradesh a northern state of India. Rampur is also part of Mandi Lok Sabha constituency.

== Members of the Legislative Assembly ==
Year	Member	Picture	Party
1952	Bhagat Ram		Indian National Congress
1952	Hardayal Singh		Indian National Congress
1967	Nek Ram Negi		Indian National Congress
1972	Nek Ram Negi		Indian National Congress
1977	Niju Ram		Janata Party
1982	Singhi Ram		Indian National Congress
1985	Singhi Ram		Indian National Congress
1990	Singhi Ram		Indian National Congress
1993	Singhi Ram		Indian National Congress
1998	Singhi Ram		Indian National Congress
2003	Singhi Ram		Indian National Congress
2007	Nand Lal		Indian National Congress
2012	Nand Lal		Indian National Congress
2017	Nand Lal		Indian National Congress
2022	Nand Lal		Indian National Congress
2026 (Note: By-poll will be held after MLA Nand Lal's death.)			

== Election results ==
=== Assembly Election 2022 ===
2022 Himachal Pradesh Legislative Assembly election: Rampur
Party	Candidate	Votes	%	±%
INC	Nand Lal	28,397	49.07%	▲1.43
BJP	Kaul Singh	27,830	48.09%	▲7.92
AAP	Uday Singh	706	1.22%	New
BSP	Desh Raj	444	0.77%	▲0.22
NOTA	Nota	377	0.65%	▼0.28
Margin of victory		567	0.98%	▼6.50
Turnout		57,871	74.95%	▼1.10
Registered electors		77,215		▲8.73
INC hold		Swing	▲1.43	

=== Assembly Election 2017 ===
2017 Himachal Pradesh Legislative Assembly election: Rampur
Party	Candidate	Votes	%	±%
INC	Nand Lal	25,730	47.64%	▼8.74
BJP	Prem Singh Daraik	21,693	40.17%	▲2.91
IND	Singhi Ram	3,801	7.04%	New
CPI(M)	Vivek Kashyap	1,325	2.45%	New
NOTA	None of the Above	504	0.93%	New
BSP	Suresh Singh Saini	297	0.55%	▼0.84
Margin of victory		4,037	7.48%	▼11.65
Turnout		54,005	76.05%	▲1.93
Registered electors		71,014		▲6.28
INC hold		Swing	▼8.74	

=== Assembly Election 2012 ===
2012 Himachal Pradesh Legislative Assembly election: Rampur
Party	Candidate	Votes	%	±%
INC	Nand Lal	27,925	56.39%	▲0.72
BJP	Prem Singh Daraik	18,454	37.26%	▼4.77
HLC	Niju Ram	2,383	4.81%	New
BSP	Chet Ram	688	1.39%	▼0.84
Margin of victory		9,471	19.12%	▲5.50
Turnout		49,523	74.12%	▲4.73
Registered electors		66,819		▼2.35
INC hold		Swing	▲0.72	

=== Assembly Election 2007 ===
2007 Himachal Pradesh Legislative Assembly election: Rampur
Party	Candidate	Votes	%	±%
INC	Nand Lal	26,430	55.66%	▼10.16
BJP	Brij Lal	19,960	42.04%	▲17.11
BSP	Kewal Ram	1,058	2.23%	New
Margin of victory		6,470	13.63%	▼27.28
Turnout		47,482	69.39%	▲0.37
Registered electors		68,429		▲12.01
INC hold		Swing		

=== Assembly Election 2003 ===
2003 Himachal Pradesh Legislative Assembly election: Rampur
Party	Candidate	Votes	%	±%
INC	Singhi Ram	27,757	65.83%	▲7.11
BJP	Brij Lal	10,510	24.92%	▲2.85
CPI(M)	Gurdyal	2,202	5.22%	New
SP	Bresi Lal	1,698	4.03%	New
Margin of victory		17,247	40.90%	▲4.26
Turnout		42,167	69.03%	▼1.09
Registered electors		61,092		▲7.77
INC hold		Swing	▲7.11	

=== Assembly Election 1998 ===
1998 Himachal Pradesh Legislative Assembly election: Rampur
Party	Candidate	Votes	%	±%
INC	Singhi Ram	23,338	58.72%	▼12.00
BJP	Ninzoo Ram	8,773	22.07%	▼6.19
Independent	Vishesher Lal	7,388	18.59%	New
Independent	Panna Lal	246	0.62%	New
Margin of victory		14,565	36.65%	▼5.81
Turnout		39,745	70.63%	▼0.43
Registered electors		56,687		▲17.27
INC hold		Swing	▼12.00	

=== Assembly Election 1993 ===
1993 Himachal Pradesh Legislative Assembly election: Rampur
Party	Candidate	Votes	%	±%
INC	Singhi Ram	24,116	70.72%	▲5.59
BJP	Ninzoo Ram	9,638	28.26%	▲17.61
BSP	Hari Dass	348	1.02%	New
Margin of victory		14,478	42.45%	▲1.33
Turnout		34,102	71.06%	▲5.92
Registered electors		48,340		▲8.36
INC hold		Swing		

=== Assembly Election 1990 ===
1990 Himachal Pradesh Legislative Assembly election: Rampur
Party	Candidate	Votes	%	±%
INC	Singhi Ram	18,777	65.13%	▼15.88
Independent	Ninzoo Ram	6,921	24.01%	New
BJP	Kewal Ram	3,072	10.66%	New
Margin of victory		11,856	41.12%	▼20.90
Turnout		28,831	65.06%	▼4.05
Registered electors		44,609		▲30.41
INC hold		Swing		

=== Assembly Election 1985 ===
1985 Himachal Pradesh Legislative Assembly election: Rampur
Party	Candidate	Votes	%	±%
INC	Singhi Ram	19,033	81.01%	▲22.89
LKD	Ninzoo Ram	4,461	18.99%	▲18.48
Margin of victory		14,572	62.02%	▲32.49
Turnout		23,494	69.35%	▲0.61
Registered electors		34,206		▲5.94
INC hold		Swing		

=== Assembly Election 1982 ===
1982 Himachal Pradesh Legislative Assembly election: Rampur
Party	Candidate	Votes	%	±%
INC	Singhi Ram	12,776	58.12%	▲48.48
Independent	Ninzoo Ram	6,285	28.59%	New
BJP	Mangat Ram Taman	2,338	10.64%	New
CPI(M)	Sadhu Ram	265	1.21%	New
JP	Chet Ram	127	0.58%	▼44.43
LKD	Sayaloo Ram	112	0.51%	New
Margin of victory		6,491	29.53%	▲8.55
Turnout		21,981	68.99%	▲23.26
Registered electors		32,289		▲16.87
INC gain from JP		Swing	▲13.12	

=== Assembly Election 1977 ===
1977 Himachal Pradesh Legislative Assembly election: Rampur
Party	Candidate	Votes	%	±%
JP	Ninzoo Ram	5,572	45.00%	New
Independent	Mangat Ram	2,974	24.02%	New
Independent	Puran Sukh	1,342	10.84%	New
INC	Nek Ram Negi	1,194	9.64%	▼63.58
Independent	Sayaloo Ram	831	6.71%	New
Independent	Samu Ram	468	3.78%	New
Margin of victory		2,598	20.98%	▼41.66
Turnout		12,381	45.30%	▲1.44
Registered electors		27,627		▲9.96
JP gain from INC		Swing	▼28.22	

=== Assembly Election 1972 ===
1972 Himachal Pradesh Legislative Assembly election: Rampur
Party	Candidate	Votes	%	±%
INC	Nek Ram Negi	7,980	73.22%	▲28.59
INC(O)	Basant Ram	1,153	10.58%	New
LRP	Ninzoo Ram	1,033	9.48%	New
Independent	Sailoo	732	6.72%	New
Margin of victory		6,827	62.64%	▲53.27
Turnout		10,898	44.27%	▲0.41
Registered electors		25,125		▲7.49
INC gain from Independent		Swing	▲19.22	

=== Assembly Election 1967 ===
1967 Himachal Pradesh Legislative Assembly election: Rampur
Party	Candidate	Votes	%	±%
Independent	Nek Ram Negi	5,423	54.00%	New
INC	B. Ram	4,482	44.63%	▲15.42
Independent	S. Dass	137	1.36%	New
Margin of victory		941	9.37%	▲8.71
Turnout		10,042	47.02%	▲10.00
Registered electors		23,375		▼22.48
Independent gain from INC		Swing		

=== Assembly Election 1952 ===
1952 Himachal Pradesh Legislative Assembly election: Rampur
Party	Candidate	Votes	%	±%
INC	Hardayal Singh	2,903	29.21%	New
INC	Bhagat Ram	2,837	28.54%	New
SCF	Basant Ram	1,420	14.29%	New
SCF	Moti Ram	1,212	12.19%	New
Socialist	Devki Nand	674	6.78%	New
KMPP	Anu Lal	461	4.64%	New
KMPP	Mesu	432	4.35%	New
Margin of victory		66	0.66%	
Turnout		9,939	32.96%	
Registered electors		30,154		
INC win (new seat)				

== See also ==
- Rampur
- Shimla district
- List of constituencies of Himachal Pradesh Legislative Assembly
