= Kullu Assembly constituency =

Legislative Assembly constituency in Himachal Pradesh State, India

Coordinates: 31.96°N 77.11°E

Kullu
- Constituency No. 23 for the Himachal Pradesh Legislative Assembly

Constituency details
- Country: India
- Region: North India
- State: Himachal Pradesh
- District: Kullu
- Lok Sabha constituency: Mandi
- Established: 1967
- Total electors: 92,050
- Reservation: None

Member of Legislative Assembly
- 14th Himachal Pradesh Legislative Assembly
- Incumbent Sunder Singh Thakur
- Party: Indian National Congress
- Elected year: 2022

Kullu Assembly constituency is one of the 68 assembly constituencies of Himachal Pradesh a northern Indian state. Kullu is also part of Mandi Lok Sabha constituency.

== Members of Legislative Assembly ==
Year	Member	Picture	Party
1967	Lal Chand Prarthi		Indian National Congress
1972	Lal Chand Prarthi		Indian National Congress
1977	Kunj Lal Thakur		Janata Party
1982	Kunj Lal Thakur		Bharatiya Janata Party
1985	Raj Krishan Gour		Indian National Congress
1990	Kunj Lal Thakur		Bharatiya Janata Party
1993	Raj Krishan Gour		Indian National Congress
1998	Chander Sain Thakur		Bharatiya Janata Party
2003	Raj Krishan Gour		Indian National Congress
2007	Govind Singh Thakur		Bharatiya Janata Party
2012	Maheshwar Singh		Himachal Lokhit Party
2017	Sunder Singh Thakur		Indian National Congress
2022	Sunder Singh Thakur		Indian National Congress

== Election results ==
=== Assembly Election 2022 ===
2022 Himachal Pradesh Legislative Assembly election: Kullu
Party	Candidate	Votes	%	±%
INC	Sunder Singh Thakur	30,286	42.56%	▼7.22
BJP	Narotam Singh	26,183	36.79%	▼10.55
Independent	Ram Singh	11,937	16.77%	New
AAP	Sher Singh	1,119	1.57%	New
CPI(M)	Hotam Singh	1,102	1.55%	New
NOTA	Nota	346	0.49%	▼0.16
Independent	Lot Rama Thakur	192	0.27%	New
Margin of victory		4,103	5.77%	▲3.33
Turnout		71,165	77.31%	▲0.01
Registered electors		92,050		▲12.73
INC hold		Swing	▼7.22	

=== Assembly Election 2017 ===
2017 Himachal Pradesh Legislative Assembly election: Kullu
Party	Candidate	Votes	%	±%
INC	Sunder Singh Thakur	31,423	49.78%	▲23.84
BJP	Maheshwar Singh	29,885	47.34%	▲20.06
Rashtriya Azad Manch	Renuka Dogra	469	0.74%	New
NOTA	None of the Above	407	0.64%	New
Margin of victory		1,538	2.44%	▼2.79
Turnout		63,122	77.31%	▼0.25
Registered electors		81,653		▲10.78
INC gain from HLC		Swing	▲17.28	

=== Assembly Election 2012 ===
2012 Himachal Pradesh Legislative Assembly election: Kullu
Party	Candidate	Votes	%	±%
HLC	Maheshwar Singh	18,582	32.51%	New
BJP	Ram Singh	15,597	27.28%	▼13.43
INC	Sunder Singh Thakur	14,830	25.94%	▲0.39
Independent	Prem Lata Thakur	7,256	12.69%	New
Shivsena	Lot Rama Thakur	458	0.80%	New
BSP	Sarita	392	0.69%	▼32.94
Margin of victory		2,985	5.22%	▼1.86
Turnout		57,165	77.56%	▲3.88
Registered electors		73,707		▼23.57
HLC gain from BJP		Swing	▼8.21	

=== Assembly Election 2007 ===
2007 Himachal Pradesh Legislative Assembly election: Kullu
Party	Candidate	Votes	%	±%
BJP	Govind Singh Thakur	28,925	40.71%	▲20.33
BSP	Dharamvir Dhami	23,892	33.63%	▲31.46
INC	Raj Krishan Gour	18,156	25.56%	▼8.14
Margin of victory		5,033	7.08%	▼4.29
Turnout		71,045	73.67%	▼2.50
Registered electors		96,433		▲14.87
BJP gain from INC		Swing		

=== Assembly Election 2003 ===
2003 Himachal Pradesh Legislative Assembly election: Kullu
Party	Candidate	Votes	%	±%
INC	Raj Krishan Gour	21,547	33.70%	▼14.11
Independent	Govind Singh Thakur	14,277	22.33%	New
BJP	Karan Singh	13,033	20.38%	▼27.49
Independent	Dharam Vir	12,953	20.26%	New
BSP	Master Jawahar Lal	1,384	2.16%	New
SP	Charan Dass	747	1.17%	New
Margin of victory		7,270	11.37%	▲11.30
Turnout		63,941	76.30%	▲12.22
Registered electors		83,947		▲5.05
INC gain from BJP		Swing	▼14.18	

=== Assembly Election 1998 ===
1998 Himachal Pradesh Legislative Assembly election: Kullu
Party	Candidate	Votes	%	±%
BJP	Chander Sain Thakur	24,467	47.88%	▲8.22
INC	Raj Krishan Gaur	24,429	47.80%	▼8.66
HVC	Gopal Dass	1,519	2.97%	New
CPI(M)	Sar Chand	688	1.35%	▼0.18
Margin of victory		38	0.07%	▼16.73
Turnout		51,103	64.53%	▼8.78
Registered electors		79,908		▲12.85
BJP gain from INC		Swing	▼8.59	

=== Assembly Election 1993 ===
1993 Himachal Pradesh Legislative Assembly election: Kullu
Party	Candidate	Votes	%	±%
INC	Raj Krishan Gour	29,077	56.46%	▼5.20
BJP	Kunj Lal	20,423	39.66%	▲2.27
CPI(M)	Sar Chand	786	1.53%	New
BSP	Duglu Ram	649	1.26%	New
Independent	Dhani Ram	307	0.60%	New
Margin of victory		8,654	16.81%	▼7.47
Turnout		51,496	73.16%	▲2.04
Registered electors		70,806		▲49.23
INC hold		Swing	▼5.20	

=== Assembly Election 1985 ===
1985 Himachal Pradesh Legislative Assembly election: Kullu
Party	Candidate	Votes	%	±%
INC	Raj Krishan Gour	20,685	61.67%	▲20.59
BJP	Chander Sain Thakur	12,542	37.39%	▼8.41
Independent	Nawal Thakur	315	0.94%	New
Margin of victory		8,143	24.28%	▲19.56
Turnout		33,542	71.36%	▼1.20
Registered electors		47,448		▲4.39
INC gain from BJP		Swing		

=== Assembly Election 1982 ===
1982 Himachal Pradesh Legislative Assembly election: Kullu
Party	Candidate	Votes	%	±%
BJP	Kunj Lal	14,967	45.80%	New
INC	Raj Krishan Gaor	13,425	41.08%	▲13.16
Independent	Lal Chand Prarthi	3,522	10.78%	New
Independent	Anirudh	500	1.53%	New
Independent	Nawal Thakur	204	0.62%	New
Margin of victory		1,542	4.72%	▼10.13
Turnout		32,677	72.93%	▲13.87
Registered electors		45,451		▲16.43
BJP gain from JP		Swing	▲3.03	

=== Assembly Election 1977 ===
1977 Himachal Pradesh Legislative Assembly election: Kullu
Party	Candidate	Votes	%	±%
JP	Kunj Lal	9,688	42.77%	New
INC	Raj Krishan Gour	6,324	27.92%	▼23.16
Independent	Bhagat Ram	3,558	15.71%	New
Independent	Ani Rudh	2,003	8.84%	New
Independent	Charan Dass	921	4.07%	New
Independent	Nawal Thakur	157	0.69%	New
Margin of victory		3,364	14.85%	▼8.51
Turnout		22,651	58.96%	▲5.67
Registered electors		39,037		▲14.51
JP gain from INC		Swing	▼8.31	

=== Assembly Election 1972 ===
1972 Himachal Pradesh Legislative Assembly election: Kullu
Party	Candidate	Votes	%	±%
INC	Lal Chand Prarthi	9,116	51.08%	▲5.59
ABJS	Kunj Lal	4,946	27.71%	▲15.81
Independent	Nawal Thakur	1,669	9.35%	New
LRP	Durga Dass	1,223	6.85%	New
Independent	Kewal Ram	661	3.70%	New
Independent	Amar Chand	232	1.30%	New
Margin of victory		4,170	23.37%	▼2.07
Turnout		17,847	53.81%	▲9.95
Registered electors		34,090		▲38.26
INC hold		Swing	▲5.59	

=== Assembly Election 1967 ===
1967 Himachal Pradesh Legislative Assembly election: Kullu
Party	Candidate	Votes	%	±%
INC	Lal Chand Prarthi	4,756	45.49%	New
Independent	N. Kishore	2,097	20.06%	New
ABJS	B. Ram	1,244	11.90%	New
Independent	J. Ram	805	7.70%	New
Independent	K. Singh	716	6.85%	New
Independent	B. Guru	481	4.60%	New
Independent	J. Nath	250	2.39%	New
Independent	C. Ram	106	1.01%	New
Margin of victory		2,659	25.43%	
Turnout		10,455	45.03%	
Registered electors		24,657		
INC win (new seat)				

== See also ==
- List of constituencies of the Himachal Pradesh Legislative Assembly
- Kullu district
- Kullu
