= 2003 Himachal Pradesh Legislative Assembly election =

Indian state legislative election

2003 Himachal Pradesh legislative assembly election
← 1998	26 February 2003	2007 →

All 68 assembly constituencies 35 seats needed for a majority
- Turnout: 73.51%
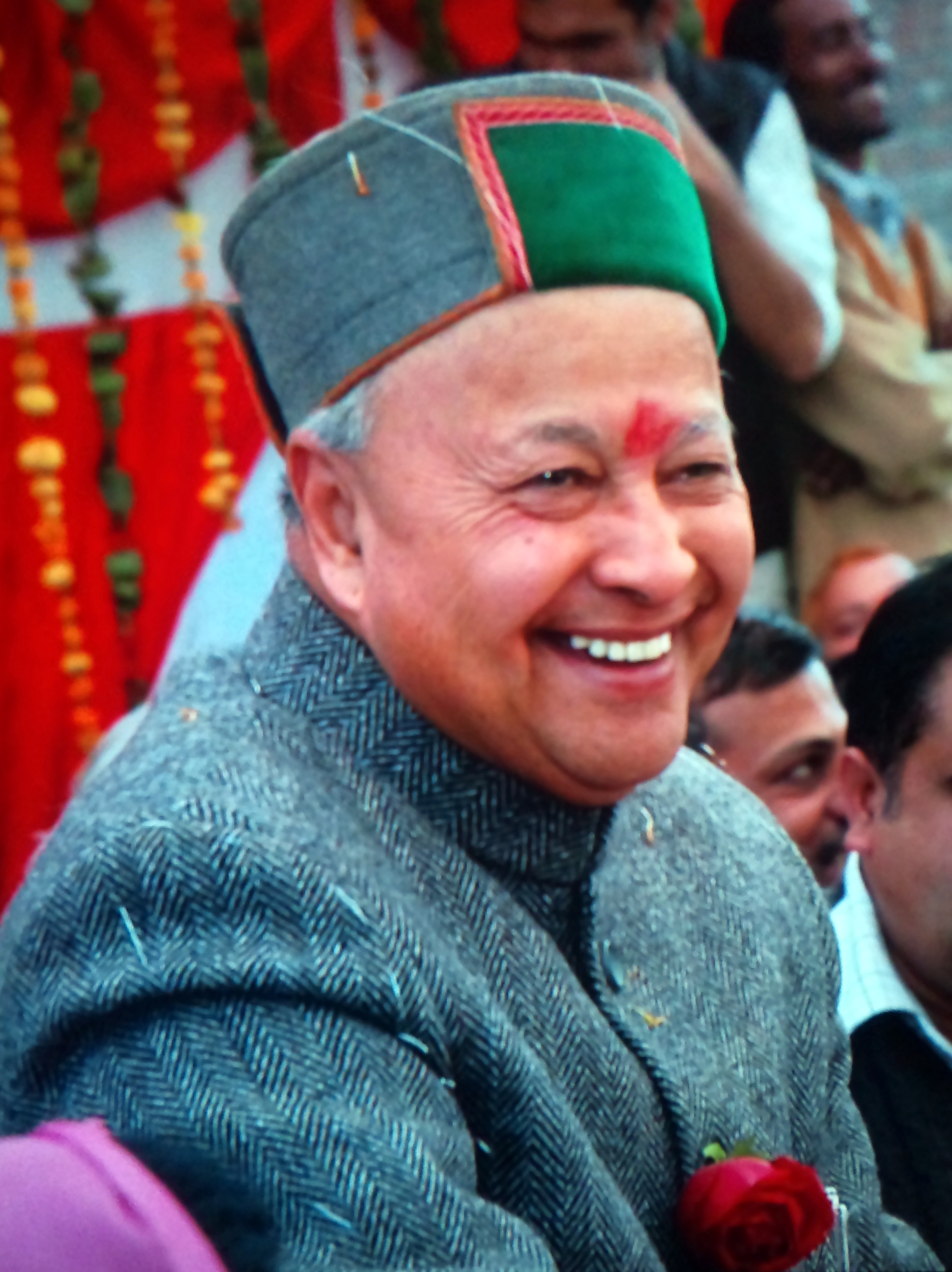

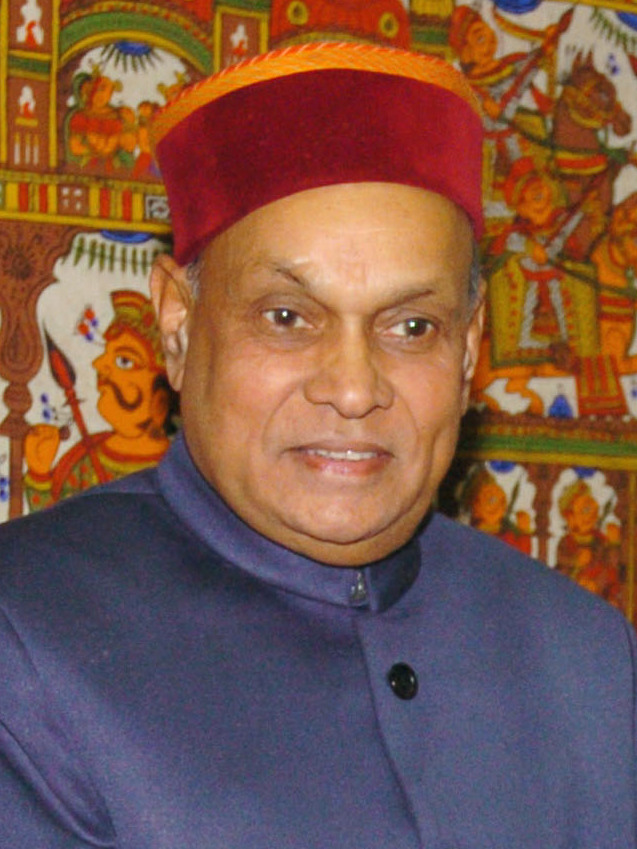
	Majority party	Minority party
Leader	Virbhadra Singh	Prem Kumar Dhumal
Party	INC	BJP
Leader's seat	Rohru	Bamsan
Seats before	31	31
Seats won	43	16
Seat change	▲12	▼15
Popular vote	1,447,319	1,300,756
Percentage	41%	35.38%
Swing	▼2.51%	▼3.62%
Chief Minister before election
Prem Kumar Dhumal
BJP
Elected Chief Minister
Virbhadra Singh
INC

Legislative Assembly elections were held in Himachal Pradesh in 2003.

== Parties and alliances ==
=== National Democratic Alliance ===
Party	Flag	Symbol	Leader	Contesting Seats
Bharatiya Janata Party			Prem Kumar Dhumal	68

=== Indian National Congress ===
Party	Flag	Symbol	Leader	Contesting Seats
Indian National Congress			Virbhadra Singh	68

=== Others ===
Party	flag	Symbol	Leader	Contesting Seats
Himachal Vikas Congress			Anil Sharma	49
Lok Janshakti Party			Ram Vilas Paswan	27
Loktantrik Morcha Himachal Pradesh			Mohinder Singh	14

== Results ==
Rank	Party	Seats contested	Seats won	% votes
1	Indian National Congress	68	43	41
2	Bharatiya Janata Party	68	16	35.38
3	Independent	68	6	12.60
4	Himachal Vikas Congress	49	1	5.87
5	Lok Jan Shakti Party	27	1	1
6	Loktantrik Morcha Himachal Pradesh	14	1	2.17
Total			68	

Source: ECI

== Elected members ==
Constituency	Reserved for (SC/ST/None)	Member	Party	Vote	Runner-up Candidates Name	Party	vote
Kinnaur	ST	Jagat Singh	Indian National Congress	19052	Tejwant Singh	Bharatiya Janata Party	11646
Rampur	SC	Singhi Ram	Indian National Congress	27757	Brij Lal	Bharatiya Janata Party	10510
Rohru	None	Virbhadra Singh	Indian National Congress	32617	Khushi Ram Balnahta	Bharatiya Janata Party	15328
Jubbal-kotkhai	None	Rohit Thakur	Indian National Congress	21884	Narinder Singh	Bharatiya Janata Party	15040
Chopal	None	Subhash Chand	Independent	10910	Yogendra Chandra	Indian National Congress	8339
Kumarsain	None	Vidya Stokes	Indian National Congress	17600	Parmod Kumar Sharma	Independent	13329
Theog	None	Rakesh Verma	Independent	19869	Rajinder Verma	Indian National Congress	16510
Simla	None	Harbhajan Singh Bhajji	Indian National Congress	12060	Sanjay Chauhan	Communist Party of India	9949
Kasumpti	SC	Sohan Lal	Independent	16972	Roop Dass Kashyap	Bharatiya Janata Party	13487
Arki	None	Dharam Pal Thakur	Indian National Congress	15933	Govind Ram Sharma	Bharatiya Janata Party	14890
Doon	None	Lajja Ram	Indian National Congress	17297	Vinod Kumari	Loktantrik Morcha Himachal Pradesh	14877
Nalagarh	None	Hari Naraian Singh	Bharatiya Janata Party	22892	Sukriti Kumari	Indian National Congress	19809
Kasauli	SC	Raghu Raj	Indian National Congress	17886	Virender Kashyap	Bharatiya Janata Party	14127
Solan	None	Dr. Rajeev Bindal	Bharatiya Janata Party	15332	Mohinder Nath Sofat	Independent	13973
Pachhad	SC	Gangu Ram Musafir	Indian National Congress	21671	Ram Prakash	Bharatiya Janata Party	20385
Rainka	SC	Dr. Prem Singh	Indian National Congress	19948	Balbir Singh	Bharatiya Janata Party	13614
Shillai	None	Harsh Wardhan	Indian National Congress	17326	Jagat Singh	Independent	9902
Paonta Doon	None	Sukh Ram	Bharatiya Janata Party	22647	Kirnesh Jung	Loktantrik Morcha Himachal Pradesh	16785
Nahan	None	Sadanand Chauhan	Lok Jan Shakti Party	14551	Kush Parmar	Indian National Congress	13360
Kot-kehloor	None	Thakur Ram Lal	Indian National Congress	19509	Randheer Kumar	Bharatiya Janata Party	16507
Bilaspur	None	Tilak Raj	Indian National Congress	22868	Jagat Prakash Nadda	Bharatiya Janata Party	20142
Ghumarwin	None	Karam Dev Dharmani	Bharatiya Janata Party	20609	Kashmir Singh	Indian National Congress	17202
Geharwin	SC	Dr. Beeru Ram Kishore	Independent	21512	Rikhi Ram Kondal	Bharatiya Janata Party	19958
Nadaun	None	Sukhvinder Singh	Indian National Congress	14379	Prabhat Chand	Independent	9794
Hamirpur	None	Anita Verma	Indian National Congress	20749	Urmil Thakur	Bharatiya Janata Party	13884
Bamsan	None	Prem Kumar Dhumal	Bharatiya Janata Party	29325	Kuldeep Singh Pathania	Indian National Congress	13627
Mewa	SC	Ishwar Dass Dhiman	Bharatiya Janata Party	22778	Suresh Kumar	Indian National Congress	21449
Nadaunta	None	Baldev Sharma	Bharatiya Janata Party	23796	Vidya Kumari	Indian National Congress	11235
Gagret	SC	Kuldeep Kumar	Indian National Congress	23297	Balbir Singh	Bharatiya Janata Party	16119
Chintpurni	None	Rakesh Kalia	Indian National Congress	26581	Praveen Sharma	Bharatiya Janata Party	15640
Santokgarh	None	Mukesh Agnihotri	Indian National Congress	16360	Jagroop Singh	Independent	11336
Una	None	Satpal Singh Satti	Bharatiya Janata Party	27651	Virender Gautam	Indian National Congress	27600
Kutlehar	None	Virender Kumar	Bharatiya Janata Party	12380	Saroj Thakur	Indian National Congress	8464
Nurpur	None	Sat Mahajan	Indian National Congress	32049	Rakesh Pathania	Bharatiya Janata Party	22450
Gangath	SC	Bodh Raj	Indian National Congress	24499	Des Raj	Bharatiya Janata Party	22220
Jawali	None	Sujan Singh	Indian National Congress	27147	Rajan Sushant	Bharatiya Janata Party	21314
Guler	None	Chander Kumar	Indian National Congress	21936	Harbans Singh	Bharatiya Janata Party	16002
Jaswan	None	Bikram Singh	Bharatiya Janata Party	17180	Viplove Thakur	Indian National Congress	14994
Pragpur	SC	Naveen Dhiman	Independent	16585	Yog Raj	Independent	12359
Jawalamukhi	None	Ramesh Chand	Bharatiya Janata Party	22459	Sanjay Rattan	Independent	8730
Thural	None	Ravinder Singh	Bharatiya Janata Party	19278	Jagdish Chand Sepehia	Indian National Congress	16467
Rajgir	SC	Atma Ram	Bharatiya Janata Party	15018	Dr.Milkhi Ram Goma	Indian National Congress	13763
Baijnath	None	Sudhir Sharma	Indian National Congress	22371	Dulo Ram	Bharatiya Janata Party	16132
Palampur	None	Brij Behari Lal	Indian National Congress	24333	Parveen Kumar	Bharatiya Janata Party	17090
Sulah	None	Jagjiwan Paul	Indian National Congress	23851	Bipan Singh Parmar	Bharatiya Janata Party	12921
Nagrota	None	G.s. Bali	Indian National Congress	27925	Ch.Ram Chand Bhatia	Bharatiya Janata Party	17531
Shahpur	None	Major Vijay Singh Mankotia	Indian National Congress	24572	Sarveen Chaudhary	Bharatiya Janata Party	20276
Dharamsala	None	Chandresh Kumari	Indian National Congress	22181	Kishan Kapoor	Bharatiya Janata Party	17063
Kangra	None	Surinder Kumar	Indian National Congress	18836	Rattan Lal Jagtamba	Bharatiya Janata Party	13803
Bhattiyat	None	Kuldip Singh Pathania	Independent	13948	Bhupinder Singh Chauhan	Independent	11722
Banikhet	None	Asha Kumari	Indian National Congress	24348	Renu Chadha	Bharatiya Janata Party	23488
Rajnagar	SC	Surinder Bhardwaj	Indian National Congress	20613	Mohan Lal	Bharatiya Janata Party	17301
Chamba	None	Harsh Mahajan	Indian National Congress	21829	B.K.Chauhan	Bharatiya Janata Party	19642
Bharmour	ST	Thakar Singh	Indian National Congress	21869	Tulsi Ram	Bharatiya Janata Party	12177
Lahaul And Spiti	ST	Raghbir Singh	Indian National Congress	9458	Dr.Ram Lal Markanda	Himachal Vikas Congress	4690
Kulu	None	Raj Krishan Gour	Indian National Congress	21547	Govind Singh Thakur	Independent	14277
Banjar	None	Khimi Ram	Bharatiya Janata Party	30842	Satya Parkash Thakur	Indian National Congress	26300
Ani	SC	Ishwar Dass	Indian National Congress	22978	Tej Ram	Bharatiya Janata Party	15385
Karsog	SC	Mast Ram	Indian National Congress	19124	Joginder Pal	Bharatiya Janata Party	13213
Chachiot	None	Jai Ram Thakur	Bharatiya Janata Party	21040	Shiv Lal	Himachal Vikas Congress	13452
Nachan	SC	Tek Chand	Indian National Congress	17479	Dile Ram	Bharatiya Janata Party	15869
Sundernagar	None	Sohan Lal Thakur	Indian National Congress	20248	Roop Singh	Bharatiya Janata Party	15610
Balh	SC	Damodar Dass	Bharatiya Janata Party	18392	Prakash Chaudhary	Himachal Vikas Congress	18204
Gopalpur	None	Rangila Ram Rao	Indian National Congress	20959	Col.Inder Singh	Bharatiya Janata Party	18440
Dharampur	None	Mohinder Singh	Loktantrik Morcha Himachal Pradesh	16854	Karamvir	Bharatiya Janata Party	12944
Joginder Nagar	None	Surender Pal	Indian National Congress	24518	Gulab Singh	Bharatiya Janata Party	17981
Darang	None	Kaul Singh	Indian National Congress	27508	Ramesh Chand	Bharatiya Janata Party	20668
Mandi	None	Sukh Ram	Himachal Vikas Congress	23816	Durga Dutt	Indian National Congress	11426

== See also ==
- 10th Himachal Pradesh Assembly
