= Deep Raj =

Indian politician

Deep Raj Bhanthal
- दीप राज भन्थल

MLA for Karsog
- Incumbent
- Assumed office 2022
- Preceded by: Hira Lal
- Constituency: Karsog Assembly constituency

Personal details
- Born: Deep Raj Bhanthal; 7 October 1988 (age 37) Karsog, Mandi district, Himachal Pradesh, India
- Citizenship: India
- Party: Bharatiya Janata Party
- Spouse: Shalini Chauhan
- Children: Khyatish,Tushita
- Parent(s): Sunder lal , Devki Devi
- Occupation: Politician
- Profession: Entrepreneur
- Nickname: Raja Bhaiya

Deep Raj (born 7 October 1988) is an Indian politician, social worker and incumbent Member of Legislative Assembly for Karsog Assembly constituency as a member of Bharatiya Janata Party. In 2022 Himachal Pradesh Legislative Assembly election, Deep Raj defeated the Mahesh Raj of Indian National Congress by the margin of 10,534 votes.

== Political career ==
- 2019 - 2022, District Convener of Bharatiya Janata Party
- 2022 - Ongoing, Member of Legislative Assembly for Karsog Assembly constituency
