= Niju Ram =

Indian politician (died 2019)

Himachal Pradesh Legislative Assembly
- In office 1977–1982
- Preceded by: Nek Ram Negi
- Succeeded by: Singhi Ram
- Constituency: Rampur

Personal details
- Died: 25 December 2019
- Political party: Bharatiya Janata Party

Niju Ram (died 25 December 2019) was an Indian politician from Himachal Pradesh belonging to Bharatiya Janata Party. He was a legislator of the Himachal Pradesh Legislative Assembly.

== Biography ==
Ram was elected as a legislator of the Himachal Pradesh Legislative Assembly from Rampur in 1977 as a Janata Party candidate. Later, he joined Bharatiya Janata Party.

Ram died on 25 December 2019.
