= Sundernagar Assembly constituency =

Legislative Assembly constituency in Himachal Pradesh State, India

Coordinates: 31.54°N 76.9°E

Sundernagar
- Constituency No. 27 for the Himachal Pradesh Legislative Assembly

Constituency details
- Country: India
- Region: North India
- State: Himachal Pradesh
- District: Mandi
- Lok Sabha constituency: Mandi
- Established: 1951
- Total electors: 83,690
- Reservation: None

Member of Legislative Assembly
- 14th Himachal Pradesh Legislative Assembly
- Incumbent Rakesh Jamwal
- Party: Bharatiya Janata Party
- Elected year: 2022

Sundernagar Assembly constituency is one of the 68 constituencies in the Himachal Pradesh Legislative Assembly of Himachal Pradesh a northern state of India. Sundernagar is also part of Mandi Lok Sabha constituency.

== Members of Legislative Assembly ==
Year	Member	Picture	Party
1951	Baldev Chand		Indian National Congress
1967	Laxmi Datt Sharma		Indian National Congress
1972	Ganga Singh		Bharatiya Jana Sangh
1977	Roop Singh		Janata Party
1982	Roop Singh		Bharatiya Janata Party
1985	Roop Singh		Bharatiya Janata Party
1990	Roop Singh		Bharatiya Janata Party
1993	Sher Singh		Indian National Congress
1998	Roop Singh		Bharatiya Janata Party
2003	Sohan Lal Thakur		Indian National Congress
2007	Roop Singh		Bharatiya Janata Party
2012	Sohan Lal Thakur		Indian National Congress
2017	Rakesh Jamwal		Bharatiya Janata Party
2022	Rakesh Jamwal		Bharatiya Janata Party

== Election results ==
=== Assembly Election 2022 ===
2022 Himachal Pradesh Legislative Assembly election: Sundernagar
Party	Candidate	Votes	%	±%
BJP	Rakesh Jamwal	29,432	44.16%	▼11.84
INC	Sohan Lal	21,307	31.97%	▼8.09
Independent	Abhishek Thakur	14,704	22.06%	New
BSP	Narayan Singh	275	0.41%	▼0.66
NOTA	Nota	211	0.32%	▼1.07
Sainik Samaj Party	Thakur Singh	195	0.29%	New
Independent	Tek Chand	149	0.22%	New
AAP	Pooja Thakur	148	0.22%	New
Independent	Het Ram	140	0.21%	New
Rashtriya Devbhumi Party	Ran Vijay Singh	90	0.14%	New
Margin of victory		8,125	12.19%	▼3.75
Turnout		66,651	79.64%	▲1.48
Registered electors		83,690		▲12.55
BJP hold		Swing	▼11.84	

=== Assembly Election 2017 ===
2017 Himachal Pradesh Legislative Assembly election: Sundernagar
Party	Candidate	Votes	%	±%
BJP	Rakesh Kumar	32,545	56.00%	▲33.03
INC	Sohan Lal	23,282	40.06%	▼6.07
NOTA	None of the Above	807	1.39%	New
BSP	Dharam Singh	624	1.07%	▲0.15
Margin of victory		9,263	15.94%	▼1.16
Turnout		58,120	78.16%	▲0.71
Registered electors		74,361		▲9.50
BJP gain from INC		Swing	▲9.87	

=== Assembly Election 2012 ===
2012 Himachal Pradesh Legislative Assembly election: Sundernagar
Party	Candidate	Votes	%	±%
INC	Sohan Lal	24,258	46.12%	▲2.90
Independent	Roop Singh	15,268	29.03%	New
BJP	Rakesh Kumar	12,076	22.96%	▼26.37
BSP	Lekh Ram	486	0.92%	▼4.88
Independent	Chet Ram	435	0.83%	New
Margin of victory		8,990	17.09%	▲10.99
Turnout		52,592	77.45%	▲0.94
Registered electors		67,908		▲34.48
INC gain from BJP		Swing	▼3.20	

=== Assembly Election 2007 ===
2007 Himachal Pradesh Legislative Assembly election: Sundernagar
Party	Candidate	Votes	%	±%
BJP	Roop Singh	19,056	49.33%	▲7.23
INC	Sohan Lal	16,698	43.22%	▼11.38
BSP	Satya Pal Gautam	2,244	5.81%	New
Independent	Bali Ram	623	1.61%	New
Margin of victory		2,358	6.10%	▼6.40
Turnout		38,631	76.50%	▼1.39
Registered electors		50,497		▲6.07
BJP gain from INC		Swing	▼5.28	

=== Assembly Election 2003 ===
2003 Himachal Pradesh Legislative Assembly election: Sundernagar
Party	Candidate	Votes	%	±%
INC	Sohan Lal	20,248	54.60%	▲15.00
BJP	Roop Singh	15,610	42.10%	▲0.03
HVC	Devender Kumar Salwani	763	2.06%	▼14.24
Independent	Devender Sharma	461	1.24%	New
Margin of victory		4,638	12.51%	▲10.04
Turnout		37,082	77.94%	▲6.33
Registered electors		47,606		▲9.10
INC gain from BJP		Swing	▲12.53	

=== Assembly Election 1998 ===
1998 Himachal Pradesh Legislative Assembly election: Sundernagar
Party	Candidate	Votes	%	±%
BJP	Roop Singh	13,136	42.07%	▲3.19
INC	Sher Singh	12,367	39.61%	▼19.13
HVC	Ajit Ram	5,088	16.29%	New
Independent	Kamal Singh	534	1.71%	New
Margin of victory		769	2.46%	▼17.39
Turnout		31,225	72.32%	▼4.46
Registered electors		43,634		▲18.95
BJP gain from INC		Swing	▼16.66	

=== Assembly Election 1993 ===
1993 Himachal Pradesh Legislative Assembly election: Sundernagar
Party	Candidate	Votes	%	±%
INC	Sher Singh	16,380	58.73%	▲24.30
BJP	Roop Singh	10,843	38.88%	▼23.99
BSP	Chander Mani	536	1.92%	▲0.16
Margin of victory		5,537	19.85%	▼8.59
Turnout		27,889	76.67%	▲4.62
Registered electors		36,684		▲4.37
INC gain from BJP		Swing		

=== Assembly Election 1990 ===
1990 Himachal Pradesh Legislative Assembly election: Sundernagar
Party	Candidate	Votes	%	±%
BJP	Roop Singh	15,778	62.87%	▲8.63
INC	Sher Singh	8,641	34.43%	▼10.64
BSP	Bhup Chand	441	1.76%	New
Independent	Madan Mohan Jagga	129	0.51%	New
Margin of victory		7,137	28.44%	▲19.27
Turnout		25,096	71.74%	▲4.96
Registered electors		35,147		▲23.94
BJP hold		Swing	▲8.63	

=== Assembly Election 1985 ===
1985 Himachal Pradesh Legislative Assembly election: Sundernagar
Party	Candidate	Votes	%	±%
BJP	Roop Singh	10,220	54.24%	▼4.56
INC	Dharam Dutt	8,492	45.07%	▲11.90
Independent	Sher Singh	131	0.70%	New
Margin of victory		1,728	9.17%	▼16.47
Turnout		18,843	66.85%	▼4.45
Registered electors		28,359		▲2.26
BJP hold		Swing		

=== Assembly Election 1982 ===
1982 Himachal Pradesh Legislative Assembly election: Sundernagar
Party	Candidate	Votes	%	±%
BJP	Roop Singh	11,560	58.80%	New
INC	Lachhami Dutt	6,520	33.16%	▲5.37
Independent	Sher Singh	569	2.89%	New
CPI	Jagdish Kumar	544	2.77%	▲1.54
Independent	Ram Lal	315	1.60%	New
JP	Krishan Chand	152	0.77%	▼32.65
Margin of victory		5,040	25.64%	▲20.22
Turnout		19,660	71.47%	▲17.75
Registered electors		27,731		▼3.49
BJP gain from JP		Swing	▲25.37	

=== Assembly Election 1977 ===
1977 Himachal Pradesh Legislative Assembly election: Sundernagar
Party	Candidate	Votes	%	±%
JP	Roop Singh	5,105	33.43%	New
Independent	Ajit Ram	4,278	28.01%	New
INC	Dharam Dutt	4,245	27.80%	▲3.23
Independent	Siwan Siri Ram	1,021	6.69%	New
CPI(M)	Dhani Ram	436	2.85%	▲0.97
CPI	Mohenga Ram	187	1.22%	New
Margin of victory		827	5.42%	▼2.02
Turnout		15,272	53.76%	▼1.88
Registered electors		28,734		▼26.52
JP gain from ABJS		Swing	▲1.43	

=== Assembly Election 1972 ===
1972 Himachal Pradesh Legislative Assembly election: Sundernagar
Party	Candidate	Votes	%	±%
ABJS	Ganga Singh	6,886	32.00%	New
INC	Lachmi Datt	5,286	24.56%	▼17.53
LRP	Dila Ram Chauhan	3,841	17.85%	New
Independent	Sunetai Prakash Singh	2,463	11.45%	New
Independent	Ajit Ram	1,389	6.45%	New
Independent	Dharam Dutt	1,248	5.80%	New
CPI(M)	Jai Chand	406	1.89%	New
Margin of victory		1,600	7.44%	▲1.16
Turnout		21,519	56.57%	▲15.90
Registered electors		39,102		▲38.21
ABJS gain from INC		Swing	▼10.10	

=== Assembly Election 1967 ===
1967 Himachal Pradesh Legislative Assembly election: Sundernagar
Party	Candidate	Votes	%	±%
INC	L. Datt	4,660	42.10%	▼36.75
Independent	G. Singh	3,965	35.82%	New
Independent	Dharam Dutt	2,445	22.09%	New
Margin of victory		695	6.28%	▼51.42
Turnout		11,070	42.81%	▲10.45
Registered electors		28,291		▲119.46
INC hold		Swing	▼36.75	

=== Assembly Election 1952 ===
1952 Himachal Pradesh Legislative Assembly election: Sundernagar
Party	Candidate	Votes	%	±%
INC	Baldev Chand	2,915	78.85%	New
ABJS	Chet Ram	782	21.15%	New
Margin of victory		2,133	57.70%	
Turnout		3,697	28.68%	
Registered electors		12,891		
INC win (new seat)				

== See also ==
- Sundernagar
- List of constituencies of Himachal Pradesh Legislative Assembly
