= Nand Lal (Himachal Pradesh politician) =

Indian politician (1954–2026)

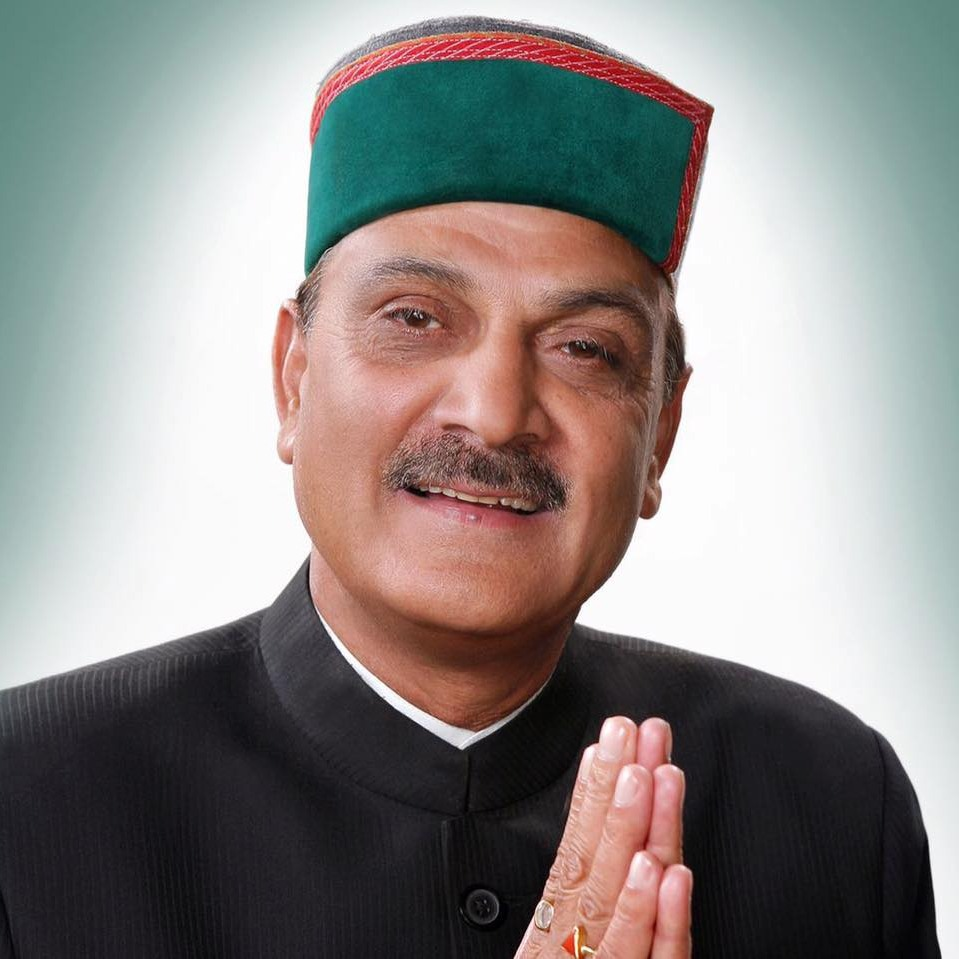

Member of the Himachal Pradesh Legislative Assembly
- In office 30 December 2007 – 3 November 2026
- Preceded by: Singhi Ram
- Constituency: Rampur

Personal details
- Born: 16 April 1954 Deothi (Rampur Bushahr), Mahasu district, Himachal Pradesh, India
- Died: 3 November 2026 (aged 72) Shimla, Himachal Pradesh, India
- Party: Indian National Congress
- Spouse: Smt. Satya
- Children: 1
- Parent: Pyare Lal
- Education: M.A. (Political Science)
- Alma mater: Himachal Pradesh University, Shimla
- Awards: President's Police Medal

Military service
- Allegiance: India
- Branch/service: Indo-Tibetan Border Police
- Years of service: 1980–2007
- Unit: Commando Contingent
- Commands: ITBP Battalion in Jammu and Kashmir

Nand Lal (16 April 1954 – 3 November 2026) was an Indian politician, who served as MLA from Rampur constituency. He was associated with Indian National Congress.

== Background ==
Nand Lal was born on 16 April 1954, in Deothi (Rampur Bushahr), Mahasu district. He was son of Pyare Lal. He was a Post Graduate in Political Science from Himachal Pradesh University, Shimla. He was married to Smt. Satya, and the couple has one son.

After completing training from the I.T.B.P. Academy, Nand Lal was inducted into the Commando Contingent of the Indo-Tibetan Border Police (I.T.B.P.). He sought voluntary retirement from Central Government Service in 2007, after which he joined the Indian National Congress.

== Political career ==
Nand Lal's political journey began with his election to the State Legislative Assembly in 2007. He was re-elected in 2012 and December 2017. He served as the Chairman of the Subordinate Legislation Committee from 2012 to 2014. He participated in various committees, including Privilege, Welfare, Public Accounts, General Development, Rural Planning, and Ethics.

Elected for the fourth consecutive term in December 2022, Nand Lal was nominated as the Chairman of the Welfare Committee and became a Member of the Rural Planning and Ethics Committees.

He had a special interest in interacting with the people of border and remote areas. He has received a letter of appreciation from former Prime Ministers Rajiv Gandhi and Chander Shekhar. Nand Lal was awarded the 'President Police Medal for Meritorious Services' in 2001 and the 'President Police Medal for Distinguished Services' for fighting against militancy and outstanding contributions.

Nand Lal's service with the Special Protection Group (S.P.G.) allowed him to visit various countries.

Actively involved in security arrangements for international events such as the Asiad in 1982, the Non-Aligned Meet in 1983, and the Commonwealth Conference in 1984, Nand Lal played a role in developmental works under the Border Area Development Programme through the 'Village Adoption Scheme' initiated by the Government of India. He also worked to instill a sense of security among the people of Jammu & Kashmir and Arunachal Pradesh.

== Death ==
Nand Lal died in Shimla on 3 November 2026, at the age of 72, after a prolonged illness.

== Electoral history ==
Year	A C No.	Constituency Name	Category	Winner	Gender	Party	Votes	Runner up	Gender	Party	Votes
2017	66	Rampur	(ST)	Nand Lal	M	INC	25730	Prem Singh Daraik	M	BJP	21693
2012	66	Rampur	(SC)	Nand Lal	M	INC	27925	Prem Singh Draik	M	BJP	18454
2007	2	Rampur	(SC)	Nand Lal	M	INC	26430	Brij Lal	M	BJP	19960
