= Balh Assembly constituency =

Legislative Assembly constituency in Himachal Pradesh State, India

Coordinates: 31.89°N 76.95°E

Balh
- Constituency No. 34 for the Himachal Pradesh Legislative Assembly

Constituency details
- Country: India
- Region: North India
- State: Himachal Pradesh
- District: Mandi
- Lok Sabha constituency: Mandi
- Established: 1967
- Total electors: 81,597
- Reservation: SC

Member of Legislative Assembly
- 14th Himachal Pradesh Legislative Assembly
- Incumbent Inder Singh
- Party: Bharatiya Janata Party
- Elected year: 2022

Balh is one of the 68 constituencies in the Himachal Pradesh Legislative Assembly of Himachal Pradesh a northern state of India. Balh is also part of Mandi Lok Sabha constituency.

== Members of the Legislative Assembly ==
Year	Member	Picture	Party
1967	Piru Ram		Indian National Congress
1972	Tulsi Ram		Communist Party of India
1977	Tulsi Ram		Janata Party
1982	Piru Ram		Indian National Congress
1985	Piru Ram		Indian National Congress
1990	Damodar Dass		Bharatiya Janata Party
1993	Nek Ram		Indian National Congress
1998	Prakash Chaudhary		Himachal Vikas Congress
2003	Damodar Dass		Bharatiya Janata Party
2007	Prakash Chaudhary		Indian National Congress
2012	Prakash Chaudhary		Indian National Congress
2017	Inder Singh Gandhi		Bharatiya Janata Party

== Election results ==
=== Assembly Election 2022 ===
2022 Himachal Pradesh Legislative Assembly election: Balh
Party	Candidate	Votes	%	±%
BJP	Inder Singh Gandhi	31,792	49.12%	▼9.92
INC	Prakash Chaudhary	30,485	47.10%	▲9.85
AAP	Tara Chand	1,406	2.17%	New
NOTA	Nota	498	0.77%	▲0.08
Margin of victory		1,307	2.02%	▼19.78
Turnout		64,726	79.32%	▼3.16
Registered electors		81,597		▲14.51
BJP hold		Swing	▼9.92	

=== Assembly Election 2017 ===
2017 Himachal Pradesh Legislative Assembly election: Balh
Party	Candidate	Votes	%	±%
BJP	Inder Singh Gandhi	34,704	59.04%	▲25.91
INC	Prakash Chaudhary	21,893	37.25%	▼1.98
BSP	Prof. Prem Kumar Hawal	466	0.79%	▼0.16
NOTA	None of the Above	403	0.69%	New
Margin of victory		12,811	21.80%	▲15.70
Turnout		58,778	82.49%	▲4.43
Registered electors		71,259		▲8.87
BJP gain from INC		Swing	▲19.81	

=== Assembly Election 2012 ===
2012 Himachal Pradesh Legislative Assembly election: Balh
Party	Candidate	Votes	%	±%
INC	Prakash Chaudhary	20,043	39.23%	▼1.46
BJP	Inder Singh Gandhi	16,927	33.13%	▼3.83
Independent	Mahant Ram	9,023	17.66%	New
Independent	Sanjay Kumar Surehali	2,487	4.87%	New
CPI(M)	Paras Ram	600	1.17%	New
HLC	Netar Singh	518	1.01%	New
BSP	Parshotam Ram	488	0.96%	▼19.60
Himachal Swabhiman Party	Padam Singh	343	0.67%	New
AITC	Shakuntala Devi	339	0.66%	New
Margin of victory		3,116	6.10%	▲2.37
Turnout		51,091	78.06%	▲0.81
Registered electors		65,451		▼17.51
INC hold		Swing	▼1.46	

=== Assembly Election 2007 ===
2007 Himachal Pradesh Legislative Assembly election: Balh
Party	Candidate	Votes	%	±%
INC	Prakash Chaudhary	24,941	40.69%	▲28.69
BJP	Damodar Dass	22,653	36.96%	▲4.15
BSP	Mahant Ram	12,599	20.55%	New
Independent	Ramesh Chand	489	0.80%	New
LJP	Dev Kant	334	0.54%	New
Margin of victory		2,288	3.73%	▲3.40
Turnout		61,295	77.25%	▼1.23
Registered electors		79,342		▲11.09
INC gain from BJP		Swing	▲7.88	

=== Assembly Election 2003 ===
2003 Himachal Pradesh Legislative Assembly election: Balh
Party	Candidate	Votes	%	±%
BJP	Damodar Dass	18,392	32.81%	▲3.03
HVC	Prakash Chaudhary	18,204	32.48%	▼13.65
Independent	Mahant Ram	9,143	16.31%	New
INC	Kashmir Singh	6,724	12.00%	▼4.06
LHMP	Lal Singh	1,827	3.26%	New
Independent	Prashotam Ram	836	1.49%	New
Independent	Padam Singh	477	0.85%	New
Independent	Chaman Lal	451	0.80%	New
Margin of victory		188	0.34%	▼16.01
Turnout		56,054	78.49%	▲3.29
Registered electors		71,419		▲20.29
BJP gain from HVC		Swing	▼13.31	

=== Assembly Election 1998 ===
1998 Himachal Pradesh Legislative Assembly election: Balh
Party	Candidate	Votes	%	±%
HVC	Parkash	20,594	46.12%	New
BJP	Damodar Dass	13,295	29.78%	▼8.47
INC	Gangbir	7,170	16.06%	▼32.97
BSP	Kanshi Ram	1,704	3.82%	▼0.43
CPI	Sukh Dev	767	1.72%	New
Independent	Chaman Rahi	669	1.50%	New
Republican Janata Party	Surender Kumar	450	1.01%	New
Margin of victory		7,299	16.35%	▲5.56
Turnout		44,649	75.89%	▲5.07
Registered electors		59,374		▲7.16
HVC gain from INC		Swing	▼2.90	

=== Assembly Election 1993 ===
1993 Himachal Pradesh Legislative Assembly election: Balh
Party	Candidate	Votes	%	±%
INC	Nek Ram	19,050	49.03%	▲18.95
BJP	Damodar Dass	14,860	38.24%	▼28.22
BSP	Narpat Ram	1,651	4.25%	▲2.29
Independent	Chaman Lal	1,256	3.23%	New
Independent	Hira Singh	1,059	2.73%	New
CPI(M)	Rajinder Mohan	451	1.16%	New
Margin of victory		4,190	10.78%	▼25.60
Turnout		38,855	70.77%	▼3.24
Registered electors		55,406		▲12.15
INC gain from BJP		Swing	▼17.43	

=== Assembly Election 1990 ===
1990 Himachal Pradesh Legislative Assembly election: Balh
Party	Candidate	Votes	%	±%
BJP	Damodar Dass	24,088	66.46%	▲21.36
INC	Piru Ram	10,900	30.07%	▼16.04
BSP	Kanshi Ram	711	1.96%	New
Doordarshi Party	Puran Chand	314	0.87%	New
Margin of victory		13,188	36.39%	▲35.38
Turnout		36,243	73.96%	▼1.58
Registered electors		49,402		▲34.25
BJP gain from INC		Swing	▲20.34	

=== Assembly Election 1985 ===
1985 Himachal Pradesh Legislative Assembly election: Balh
Party	Candidate	Votes	%	±%
INC	Piru Ram	12,719	46.12%	▼3.71
BJP	Damoder Dass	12,440	45.11%	▼2.68
Independent	Nek Ram	1,541	5.59%	New
CPI	Karam Singh	266	0.96%	New
Independent	Dharam Singh	234	0.85%	New
Independent	Anant Ram	201	0.73%	New
Independent	Minku Ram	178	0.65%	New
Margin of victory		279	1.01%	▼1.03
Turnout		27,579	75.79%	▲3.61
Registered electors		36,798		▲6.06
INC hold		Swing	▼3.71	

=== Assembly Election 1982 ===
1982 Himachal Pradesh Legislative Assembly election: Balh
Party	Candidate	Votes	%	±%
INC	Piru Ram	12,334	49.83%	▲8.13
BJP	Damodar Dass	11,828	47.79%	New
Independent	Narpat Ram	369	1.49%	New
Independent	Anant Ram	220	0.89%	New
Margin of victory		506	2.04%	▼0.06
Turnout		24,751	72.38%	▲8.06
Registered electors		34,696		▲17.92
INC gain from JP		Swing	▲6.02	

=== Assembly Election 1977 ===
1977 Himachal Pradesh Legislative Assembly election: Balh
Party	Candidate	Votes	%	±%
JP	Tulsi Ram	8,157	43.81%	New
INC	Piroo Ram	7,765	41.70%	▼6.04
Independent	Nek Ram	2,531	13.59%	New
Independent	Gatu Ram	111	0.60%	New
Margin of victory		392	2.11%	▼1.31
Turnout		18,619	64.41%	▲11.69
Registered electors		29,424		▲0.37
JP gain from CPI(M)		Swing	▼7.36	

=== Assembly Election 1972 ===
1972 Himachal Pradesh Legislative Assembly election: Balh
Party	Candidate	Votes	%	±%
CPI(M)	Tulsi Ram	7,738	51.17%	New
INC	Nek Ram	7,221	47.75%	▼3.33
Independent	Ram Dass	164	1.08%	New
Margin of victory		517	3.42%	▼6.56
Turnout		15,123	53.42%	▲5.48
Registered electors		29,315		▲19.14
CPI(M) gain from INC		Swing	▲0.09	

=== Assembly Election 1967 ===
1967 Himachal Pradesh Legislative Assembly election: Balh
Party	Candidate	Votes	%	±%
INC	Piru Ram	5,795	51.08%	New
Independent	T. Ram	4,663	41.10%	New
Independent	B. Singh	888	7.83%	New
Margin of victory		1,132	9.98%	
Turnout		11,346	49.29%	
Registered electors		24,606		
INC win (new seat)				

== See also ==
- Balh
- Mandi district
- List of constituencies of Himachal Pradesh Legislative Assembly
