= Sukh Ram =

Indian politician (1927–2022)

Pandit Sukh Ram

Member of Parliament, Lok Sabha
- In office 1 December 1989 – 5 March 1998
- Preceded by: Maheshwar Singh
- Succeeded by: Maheshwar Singh
- Constituency: Mandi, Himachal Pradesh
- In office 1984 – 1989
- Preceded by: Virbhadra Singh
- Succeeded by: Maheshwar Singh
- Constituency: Mandi, Himachal Pradesh

Union Minister of Communications and Information Technology
- In office 18 January 1993 – 16 May 1996
- Prime Minister: P. V. Narasimha Rao
- Preceded by: Rajesh Pilot
- Succeeded by: Atal Bihari Vajpayee

Personal details
- Born: Sukhram Sharma; 27 July 1927 Mandi, Punjab, British India
- Died: 11 May 2022 (aged 94) New Delhi, India
- Party: Indian National Congress
- Other political affiliations: Bharatiya Janata Party (2017–2019); Himachal Vikas Congress (1998–2017)
- Relations: Aayush Sharma (grandson)
- Children: Anil Sharma (son)
- Education: Delhi Law School
- Profession: Politician

Pandit Sukh Ram (born Sukhram Sharma; 27 July 1927 – 11 May 2022) was an Indian politician who served as the Minister of Communications and Information Technology from 1993 to 1996. He was a member of Lok Sabha from the Mandi constituency of Himachal Pradesh. He won the Vidhan Sabha elections five times and the Lok Sabha elections three times. He is the father of politician Anil Sharma and grandfather of actor Aayush Sharma. In 2011 he was sentenced to 5 years in jail for corruption when he was Communications Minister in 1996.

== Early life ==
Sukhram Sharma was born on 27 July 1927 in a poor family of 10 children in Kotli, Himachal Pradesh.

He attended the Delhi Law School and practised as a lawyer at the Mandi District law courts in 1953. In 1962, he became a Member of the Territorial Council in Himachal Pradesh.

== Political career ==
Ram represented the Mandi Assembly seat from 1963 to 1984. He was elected to the Lok Sabha in 1984 and served as a junior minister in the Rajiv Gandhi government. He served as minister of state for defence production and supplies, planning and food and civil supplies. Sukh Ram was the Union minister of state (independent charge) holding the communications portfolio from 1993 to 1996.

While Ram represented the Mandi Lok Sabha constituency, his son contested and won the Assembly seat in 1993. Ram won the Mandi Lok Sabha seat in 1996, but the two were expelled from the Congress party after the telecom scam. They formed the Himachal Vikas Congress, entered into a post-poll alliance with the BJP and joined the government.

Ram contested the Assembly Elections in 1998 from Mandi Sadar and won by a huge margin of 22000+ votes; that was highest in the State. His son Anil Sharma was elected to the Rajya Sabha in 1998. In the 2003 Assembly poll, Ram retained the Mandi Assembly seat but joined the Congress in the run-up to the 2004 Lok Sabha polls. Sharma won the Mandi Assembly seat in 2007 and 2012 as a Congress candidate. In 2017, prior to elections, Ram joined BJP along with Sharma and grandson Aashray Sharma.

It is considered as impact of Ram that BJP won 9 out of 10 seats in Mandi District and one seat i.e. Joginder Nagar was won by an independent candidate. Sharma was the Power Minister in the state of Himachal Pradesh under BJP regime. The family has a significant influence among the Himachal's brahmins, who comprise nearly 20%, or a fifth, of the state's electorate (the second-highest for any state in India, next to Uttarakhand). His other grandson Aayush Sharma is an actor and married superstar Salman Khan's sister.

Ram crossed over to Bharatiya Janata Party in 2017 before reverting to the Indian National Congress in 2019.

== Jail ==
In 1996 he was Communications Minister during a major telecom scam. In 2011 he was sentenced to 5 years in jail for corruption in this scam.

== See also ==
- List of scandals in India
- Licence Raj
- Mafia Raj
- Lok Ayukta

Lok Sabha
Preceded by Virbhadra Singh	Member of Parliament for Mandi; 1984 – 1989	Succeeded by Maheshwar Singh
Preceded by Maheshwar Singh	Member of Parliament for Mandi; 1991 – 1998	Succeeded by Maheshwar Singh
Political offices
Preceded by Rajesh Pilot (MoS, Independent Charge)	Minister of Communications and Information Technology (MoS, Independent Charge); 17 January 1993 - 16 May 1996	Succeeded by Atal Bihari Vajpayee
