= Hira Lal =

Hira Lal may refer to:

- Hira Lal (skier)
- Hira Lal (politician)
