= Karsog Assembly constituency =

Legislative Assembly constituency in Himachal Pradesh State, India

Coordinates: 31.38°N 77.20°E

Karsog
- Constituency No. 26 for the Himachal Pradesh Legislative Assembly

Constituency details
- Country: India
- Region: North India
- State: Himachal Pradesh
- District: Mandi
- Lok Sabha constituency: Mandi
- Established: 1951
- Total electors: 76,609
- Reservation: SC

Member of Legislative Assembly
- 14th Himachal Pradesh Legislative Assembly
- Incumbent Deep Raj
- Party: Bharatiya Janata Party
- Elected year: 2022

Karsog is one of the 68 assembly constituencies of Himachal Pradesh a northern Indian state. Karsog is also part of Mandi Lok Sabha constituency.

== Members of the Legislative Assembly ==
Year	Member	Picture	Party
1951	Rattan Singh		Indian National Congress
1967	Mansa Ram		Independent
1972	Mansa Ram		Indian National Congress
1977	Joginder Pal		Janata Party
1982	Mansa Ram		Independent
1985	Joginder Pal		Bharatiya Janata Party
1990	Joginder Pal		Bharatiya Janata Party
1993	Mast Ram		Indian National Congress
1998	Mansa Ram		Himachal Vikas Congress
2003	Mast Ram		Indian National Congress
2007	Hira Lal		Independent
2012	Mansa Ram		Indian National Congress
2017	Hira Lal		Bharatiya Janata Party
2022	Deep Raj Kapoor		Bharatiya Janata Party

== Election results ==
=== Assembly Election 2022 ===
2022 Himachal Pradesh Legislative Assembly election: Karsog
Party	Candidate	Votes	%	±%
BJP	Deep Raj	34,512	57.36%	▲15.03
INC	Mahesh Raj	23,978	39.85%	▲6.77
CPI(M)	Kishori Lal	480	0.80%	New
AAP	Bhagwant Singh	471	0.78%	New
NOTA	Nota	363	0.60%	▼0.69
BSP	Chaman Lal	209	0.35%	▼0.24
Independent	Ghanshyam Azad	156	0.26%	New
Margin of victory		10,534	17.51%	▲8.26
Turnout		60,169	78.54%	▲0.98
Registered electors		76,609		▲13.78
BJP hold		Swing	▲15.03	

=== Assembly Election 2017 ===
2017 Himachal Pradesh Legislative Assembly election: Karsog
Party	Candidate	Votes	%	±%
BJP	Hira Lal	22,102	42.33%	▲10.92
INC	Mansa Ram	17,272	33.08%	▼7.62
Independent	Mast Ram	5,675	10.87%	New
Independent	Bhagat Ram	2,702	5.17%	New
Independent	Pawan Kumar	990	1.90%	New
Independent	Bhagwant Singh	842	1.61%	New
NOTA	None of the Above	674	1.29%	New
Rashtriya Azad Manch	Mehar Singh Khukhaliya	521	1.00%	New
Independent	Anita Alias Nitu	362	0.69%	New
BSP	Chaman Lal	309	0.59%	▼1.02
Margin of victory		4,830	9.25%	▼0.04
Turnout		52,218	77.56%	▲0.74
Registered electors		67,329		▲10.91
BJP gain from INC		Swing	▲1.63	

=== Assembly Election 2012 ===
2012 Himachal Pradesh Legislative Assembly election: Karsog
Party	Candidate	Votes	%	±%
INC	Mansa Ram	18,978	40.70%	▲12.85
BJP	Hira Lal	14,646	31.41%	▲3.28
Independent	Mast Ram	11,000	23.59%	New
Independent	Chaman Lal Chauhan	1,208	2.59%	New
BSP	Chet Ram	753	1.61%	▼0.93
Margin of victory		4,332	9.29%	▼1.75
Turnout		46,634	76.82%	▲1.51
Registered electors		60,706		▼8.70
INC gain from Independent		Swing	▲1.53	

=== Assembly Election 2007 ===
2007 Himachal Pradesh Legislative Assembly election: Karsog
Party	Candidate	Votes	%	±%
Independent	Hira Lal	19,609	39.16%	New
BJP	Mansa Ram	14,082	28.12%	▼1.86
INC	Mast Ram	13,944	27.85%	▼15.55
BSP	Bhim Singh	1,275	2.55%	New
CPI	Raj Kumar	1,107	2.21%	New
Margin of victory		5,527	11.04%	▼2.38
Turnout		50,071	75.31%	▲0.70
Registered electors		66,490		▲12.57
Independent gain from INC		Swing	▼4.24	

=== Assembly Election 2003 ===
2003 Himachal Pradesh Legislative Assembly election: Karsog
Party	Candidate	Votes	%	±%
INC	Mast Ram	19,124	43.40%	▲13.34
BJP	Joginder Pal	13,213	29.98%	▼0.30
HVC	Mansa Ram	11,730	26.62%	▼8.94
Margin of victory		5,911	13.41%	▲8.13
Turnout		44,067	74.64%	▲3.56
Registered electors		59,067		▲14.71
INC gain from HVC		Swing		

=== Assembly Election 1998 ===
1998 Himachal Pradesh Legislative Assembly election: Karsog
Party	Candidate	Votes	%	±%
HVC	Mansa Ram	13,009	35.56%	New
BJP	Joginder Pal	11,077	30.28%	▼1.51
INC	Mast Ram	10,997	30.06%	▼37.29
CPI(M)	Hari Saran	1,498	4.10%	New
Margin of victory		1,932	5.28%	▼30.28
Turnout		36,581	71.57%	▲8.76
Registered electors		51,492		▲11.51
HVC gain from INC		Swing	▼31.79	

=== Assembly Election 1993 ===
1993 Himachal Pradesh Legislative Assembly election: Karsog
Party	Candidate	Votes	%	±%
INC	Mast Ram	19,371	67.36%	▲50.45
BJP	Joginder Pal	9,144	31.80%	▼35.31
Margin of victory		10,227	35.56%	▼14.64
Turnout		28,759	62.65%	▲6.45
Registered electors		46,177		▲9.12
INC gain from BJP		Swing		

=== Assembly Election 1990 ===
1990 Himachal Pradesh Legislative Assembly election: Karsog
Party	Candidate	Votes	%	±%
BJP	Joginder Pal	15,855	67.11%	▲12.73
INC	Mansa Ram	3,995	16.91%	▼22.03
Independent	Mast Ram	2,220	9.40%	New
Independent	Prakash Chand Shastri	812	3.44%	New
CPI	Nand Lal	442	1.87%	New
Independent	Sangat Ram	303	1.28%	New
Margin of victory		11,860	50.20%	▲34.76
Turnout		23,627	56.13%	▼10.88
Registered electors		42,317		▲28.74
BJP hold		Swing	▲12.73	

=== Assembly Election 1985 ===
1985 Himachal Pradesh Legislative Assembly election: Karsog
Party	Candidate	Votes	%	±%
BJP	Joginder Pal	11,925	54.38%	▲16.16
INC	Mansha Ram	8,540	38.94%	▲23.46
Independent	Sangat Ram	1,465	6.68%	New
Margin of victory		3,385	15.44%	▲7.35
Turnout		21,930	67.29%	▲4.99
Registered electors		32,870		▲4.47
BJP gain from Independent		Swing		

=== Assembly Election 1982 ===
1982 Himachal Pradesh Legislative Assembly election: Karsog
Party	Candidate	Votes	%	±%
Independent	Mansha Ram	8,992	46.30%	New
BJP	Sunder Singh	7,422	38.22%	New
INC	Mast Ram	3,007	15.48%	New
Margin of victory		1,570	8.08%	▼26.57
Turnout		19,421	62.33%	▲14.70
Registered electors		31,463		▲17.02
Independent gain from JP		Swing	▼13.66	

=== Assembly Election 1977 ===
1977 Himachal Pradesh Legislative Assembly election: Karsog
Party	Candidate	Votes	%	±%
JP	Joginder Pal	7,582	59.96%	New
Independent	Sangat Ram	3,200	25.31%	New
Independent	Mansha Ram	1,863	14.73%	New
Margin of victory		4,382	34.65%	▼6.13
Turnout		12,645	47.44%	▲10.59
Registered electors		26,888		▼13.07
JP gain from INC		Swing	▼1.72	

=== Assembly Election 1972 ===
1972 Himachal Pradesh Legislative Assembly election: Karsog
Party	Candidate	Votes	%	±%
INC	Mansha Ram	6,951	61.68%	▲29.01
Independent	Joginder Pal	2,355	20.90%	New
Independent	Katru Ram	1,870	16.59%	New
ABJS	Ram Dass	94	0.83%	New
Margin of victory		4,596	40.78%	▲21.21
Turnout		11,270	37.26%	▲7.42
Registered electors		30,930		▲11.52
INC gain from Independent		Swing	▲9.43	

=== Assembly Election 1967 ===
1967 Himachal Pradesh Legislative Assembly election: Karsog
Party	Candidate	Votes	%	±%
Independent	Mansa Ram	4,204	52.24%	New
INC	Nakbinhoo	2,629	32.67%	▼56.15
Independent	Zalam	794	9.87%	New
Independent	D. Ram	420	5.22%	New
Margin of victory		1,575	19.57%	▼58.08
Turnout		8,047	31.88%	▲13.62
Registered electors		27,735		▲64.57
Independent gain from INC		Swing	▼36.58	

=== Assembly Election 1952 ===
1952 Himachal Pradesh Legislative Assembly election: Karsog
Party	Candidate	Votes	%	±%
INC	Rattan Singh	2,305	88.82%	New
ABJS	Achhari Ram	290	11.18%	New
Margin of victory		2,015	77.65%	
Turnout		2,595	15.40%	
Registered electors		16,853		
INC win (new seat)				

== See also ==
- List of constituencies of the Himachal Pradesh Legislative Assembly
- Karsog
