= Jia Lal =

Indian politician (born 1964)

Member of the Himachal Pradesh Legislative Assembly
- In office 2017–2022
- Preceded by: Thakur Singh Bharmouri
- Succeeded by: Dr. Janak Raj
- Constituency: Bharmour constituency

Personal details
- Born: 8 November 1964 (age 61) Bharmour, Chamba, Himachal Pradesh
- Party: Bharatiya Janata Party
- Parent(s): Laxman Das; Laxmi Devi
- Education: Matriculation

Jia Lal (born 8 November 1964) is an Indian politician, who currently serves as Member of Legislative Assembly from Bharmour Assembly constituency. Jia Lal won from Bharmour constituency in 2017 state assembly elections.

== Early life and education ==
Lal was born on 8 November 1964 in Bharmour, Chamba, Himachal Pradesh to Laxman Das and Laxmi Devi. He did his school education up to Matriculation.

== Politics ==
Lal's active state politics started from 1993 as he was the president of Bharatiya Janata Party Yuva Morcha, Bharmour Mandal from 1993-96. He was president of BJP for district Chamba from 2010-13. Then in 2017, he was elected to the thirteenth Himachal Pradesh Legislative Assembly in December, 2017.
