= Loveyatri =

2018 film directed by Abhiraj K. Minawala

Loveyatri: A Journey of Love
- Theatrical release poster
- Directed by: Abhiraj K. Minawala
- Written by: Niren Bhatt
- Based on: Devadasu (2006) by Y. V. S. Chowdary
- Produced by: Salman Khan
- Starring: Aayush Sharma; Hira Warina
- Cinematography: Jishnu Bhattacharjee
- Edited by: Ritesh Soni
- Music by: Songs: Tanishk Bagchi; Lijo George – DJ Chetas; JAM8; Score: Sanchit Balhara
- Production company: Salman Khan Films
- Distributed by: Yash Raj Films
- Release date: 5 October 2018 (India)
- Running time: 139 minutes
- Country: India
- Language: Hindi
- Budget: ₹32 crore
- Box office: est. ₹18.14 crore

Loveyatri: A Journey of Love (Hindi pronunciation: [ləʋjaːt̪ɾɪ]) is a 2018 Indian Hindi-language romantic comedy film produced by Salman Khan under Salman Khan Films and directed by debutante Abhiraj K. Minawala. It is a remake of the 2006 Telugu film Devadasu. It stars newcomers Aayush Sharma and Hira Warina in the lead roles and was released on 5 October 2018.

== Plot ==
The story starts with Sushrut "Susu" Pandya who meets Manisha "Michelle" Patel during a Garba festival. Sushrut is a local guy from a middle class household in Gujarat who wishes to open a Garba academy while Michelle is a bright NRI student from a wealthy family. They meet when she comes to Vadodara. Sushrut falls in love at first sight and wishes to meet Michelle again. During one of the Garba nights, Sushrut stays around Michelle and she accidentally hits dandiya on his eye. He fakes an injury with his friends Negative and Rocket and his uncle playing along. She calls him to apologize. Sushrut acts as if he was deeply injured.

As time passes Sushrut and Michelle spend time together and they become friends. Kushboo (Rocket's love interest) tells Sushrut that he shouldn't play around with Michelle's feelings and that she will reveal the truth about his fake injury. Sushrut, fearing he will lose Michelle once she finds out about his lie, accidentally reveals the truth himself to her when he goes to find out why she hasn't returned his calls or messages. Michelle says she already understood that the injury was fake as he goofed up and bandaged the incorrect side of his forehead. Also, he kept the bandage just for a day then forgot to put it back the next day. They laugh and start developing feelings for each other. One night they open up to each other revealing Michelle's dream to make her late mother's wishes come true. That same evening Michelle's father, Sam, looks for her and Kushboo reveals the truth about Michelle's whereabouts and Sushrut. Sam decides to take matters into his own hands and sets up a meeting with Sushrut only to brainwash him against Michelle and reveals she has a boyfriend named Chris back in London.

Meanwhile, Michelle finds out about her graduation and treats Sushrut, Rocket and Negative to pizza at an expensive restaurant. Whilst there, Sushrut vents his anger at her and insults her for leading him on. Michelle, not understanding and clearly upset, leaves the restaurant. She goes back to London with Sam. Sushrut, however, is unable to bear the separation and after his uncle convinces him, he rushes to meet Michelle with Negative and Rocket, but they have an accident and miss their chance as the flight takes off.

After some time, Sushrut manages to arrive in London with his uncle and searches for Michelle. He meets her at the soup kitchen she had told him about before. Sushrut and Michelle hang out and she introduces him to her friends, Chris being one of them. As he spends time with them he is annoyed by Chris and Michelle's closeness and doesn't enjoy the London lifestyle Michelle leads. At the same time Sam discovers that Sushrut is in London and is always around Michelle. He tries to keep them apart by confronting Sushrut again. This time he takes a cricket bat and damages his car and forces Sushruts's hand around his neck in order to frame him. The police arrive, Sushrut is arrested and taken away. At the police station, he meets two Gujarati police officers and tells them his story. They agree to help Sushrut unite with Michelle.

Michelle tries to reach Sushrut to no avail and goes to see his uncle. His uncle reveals that Sushrut has been missing and reveals what Sam had done back in India. She confronts him and lashes out at home for his actions. Eventually Sushrut enters the park in a jeep and both Sushrut and Michelle play Garba together. Michelle reveals to Sushrut that her "boyfriend" Chris is actually gay. Sam realises his mistake and joins the couple, blessing them for a happy life ahead.

Michelle eventually goes back to India and successfully fulfills her mother's dream whilst Sushrut has finally opened up his Garba Academy. In the end they both live happily after.

== Cast ==
- Aayush Sharma as Sushrut "Susu" Pandya, Michelle's love interest and later husband
- Warina Hussain as Manisha "Michelle" Patel, Sushrut's love interest and later wife
  - Naisha Khanna as Little Michelle
- Ronit Roy as Sameer "Sam" Patel, Michelle's father
- Ram Kapoor as Rasik Desai, Susu's uncle (mama)
- Pratik Gandhi as Nagendra "Negative" Pathak, Susu's best friend
- Sajeel Parakh as Rakesh "Rocket" Joshi, Susu's best friend
- Manoj Joshi as Natthu Kaka
- Kenneth Desai as Hari Pandya, Sushrut's father
- Alpana Buch as Seema Pandya, Susu's mother
- Alisha Prajapati as Khushboo Pandey, Negative's girlfriend & Michelle's friend in Vadodara
- Bilal Kazi
- Arnab Shah
- Amitabh Mishra
- Tainara as Mrs. Patel, Sam's wife & Michelle's mother
- Arbaaz Khan as Inspector Jignesh Ajmera, London Police (special guest appearance)
- Sohail Khan as Inspector Bhavesh Ajmera, London Police (special guest appearance)
- Amit Bhatt as Guest appearance
- Kyle Smith as Chris Cost, Michelle's friend in London
- Caroline Wilde as Kate Mathew, Michelle's friend in London
- Tordan Bhai as Chaiwala in Vadodara

== Production ==
Salman Khan announced the film in 2017. He also confirmed via Twitter that the film would star his brother-in-law Aayush Sharma and would be directed by Abhiraj Minawala. Abhiraj was Ali Abbas Zafar's assistant director for Sultan and Tiger Zinda Hai. In February 2018, Salman announced that Warina Hussain would be the leading lady of the film. The film is the Bollywood debut for both Aayush and Warina. Loveyatri is a romantic drama set against the backdrop of Navratri in Gujarat. Aayush stars as a Garba teacher from Baroda, who falls in love with an NRI, played by Warina, when she visits the town during the festival.

The film was shot in two schedules. Several scenes were also shot in Vadodara in March 2018. This was followed by the second half starting in April 2018 in London. Principal photography completed in June 2018.

== Soundtrack ==
Loveyatri – A Journey of Love

Soundtrack album by Tanishk Bagchi, Lijo George – DJ Chetas and JAM8
- Released: 3 October 2018
- Recorded: 2018
- Genre: Feature film soundtrack
- Length: 32:18
- Language: Hindi
- Label: T-Series
External audio
- Official Audio Jukebox on YouTube

Tanishk Bagchi chronology
Mitron (2018)	Loveyatri (2018)	Jalebi (2018)

JAM8 chronology
Crisscross (2018)	Loveyatri (2018)	Badhaai Ho (2018)

Lijo George – DJ Chetas chronology
Mitron (2018)	Loveyatri (2018)	Simmba (2018)

Singles from Loveyatri
- 1. "Chogada" Released: 14 August 2018; 2. "Akh Lad Jaave" Released: 23 August 2018; 3. "Tera Hua" Released: 30 August 2018

Tanishk Bagchi, Lijo George – DJ Chetas and JAM8 composed the soundtrack of the film while the lyrics are penned by Shabbir Ahmed, Manoj Muntashir, Darshan Raval, Tanishk Bagchi, Badshah, Niren Bhatt, Yo Yo Honey Singh and Hommie Dilliwala.

The soundtrack of the film was released by T-Series on 3 October 2018. The song "Chogada Tara" became popular upon release.

Track listing
No.	Title	Lyrics	Music	Singer(s)	Length
1.	"Chogada"	Darshan Raval, Shabbir Ahmed	Lijo George – DJ Chetas	Darshan Raval, Asees Kaur	4:09
2.	"Akh Lad Jaave"	Tanishk Bagchi, Badshah	Tanishk Bagchi	Asees Kaur, Jubin Nautiyal, Rap by: Badshah	3:00
3.	"Tera Hua"	Manoj Muntashir	Tanishk Bagchi	Atif Aslam	3:34
4.	"Rangtaari"	Shabbir Ahmed, Yo Yo Honey Singh, Hommie Dilliwala	Tanishk Bagchi	Dev Negi, Yo Yo Honey Singh; Additional Vocal: Raja Hasan	3:37
5.	"Dholida"	Shabbir Ahmed	Tanishk Bagchi	Udit Narayan, Palak Muchhal, Neha Kakkar, Raja Hasan	3:36
6.	"Loveyatri Title Track"	Niren Bhatt	JAM8	Divya Kumar	2:32
7.	"Chogada" (Unplugged)	Darshan Raval, Shabbir Ahmed	Lijo George – DJ Chetas	Darshan Raval	4:00
8.	"Tera Hua" (Unplugged)	Manoj Muntashir	Tanishk Bagchi	Atif Aslam	3:50
9.	"Loveyatri Mashup"	Various Artists	Lijo George-DJ Chetas	Various Artists	4:00
Total length:					32:18

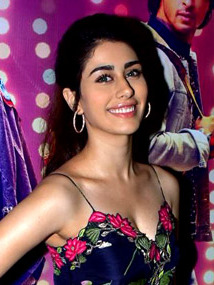
Warina Hussain promoting Loveratri at R. D. National College in Bandra

== Controversy ==
A minor dispute emerged during the film's promotions, in late September 2018, regarding the film's name. It was originally titled Loveratri, which is a play on the words "love" and "Navratri" (a religious 9-day celebration of the Hindu goddess Durga). However, the religious organisation Vishva Hindu Parishad felt that the title distorted the meaning of the festival and filed a complaint against the producers. A court in Bihar asked the police to file a First Information Report against the actor Salman Khan and the rest of the film's cast. On 18 September 2018, Khan announced on his Instagram page that the film's title would be changed from Loveratri to Loveyatri, with "yatri" meaning "traveller", thus changing the overall meaning approximately to "the journey of love".

However, the following day a Gujarat-based Hindu organization, Sanatan Foundation, legally filed a Public Interest Litigation against the new name, claiming that it still sounded too similar to "Navratri". They sought another name change (possibly to "Love Ki Yatra"), changing the film's content, or to ban the film entirely for "hurting the sentiments of Hindus".

On 27 September 2018, the Supreme Court ruled in favor of the film's producers, stating that "no coercive action is to be taken in any part of the country against Salman Khan Ventures Pvt ltd." The ruling was submitted considering the film's status as having been cleared by the Central Board of Film Certification (CBFC), and yet had an FIR registered in Bihar against it and a criminal complaint pending in Vadodara, Gujarat. The statement concluded by asserting that any further complaints, particularly those related to the contents or name of the film, would not be entertained.
