= Aayush Sharma =

Indian actor (born 1990)

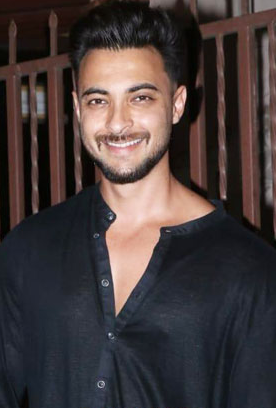
- Sharma in 2022
- Born: 26 October 1990 (age 35); Mandi, Himachal Pradesh, India
- Occupation: Actor
- Years active: 2018–present
- Spouse: Arpita Khan Sharma (m. 2014)
- Children: 2
- Father: Anil Sharma
- Relatives: Salman Khan (brother in-law); Sohail Khan (brother in-law); Arbaaz Khan (brother in-law); Alvira Khan Agnihotri (sister in-law); Pandit Sukh Ram (grandfather)
- Family: Salim Khan family

Aayush Sharma (born 26 October 1990) is an Indian actor who works in Hindi films. He made his film debut with brother-in-law Salman Khan's production Loveyatri (2018) and Antim: The Final Truth (2021), in which he starred alongside Khan.

== Early life ==
Aayush Sharma was born on 26 October 1990 in Mandi, Himachal Pradesh to Anil and Sunita Sharma. He has a sibling, Aashray Sharma. He is the grandson of veteran congress leader Pandit Sukh Ram, ex-cabinet minister, who came from village Kotli in district Mandi. Sharma's family has been involved in politics for more than 50 years and have a very special place in Himachal politics.

== Career ==
In 2018, Sharma debuted in Bollywood with the lead role in Salman Khan's production Loveyatri opposite newcomer Warina Hussain. In 2020, he and Saiee Manjrekar were seen in the music video Manjha by Vishal Mishra. His breakthrough came in 2021 when he portrayed a gangster alongside Khan in his another production Antim.

He is next set to appear in the actioner Kwatha with Isabelle Kaif, a film delayed since 2019.

== Personal life ==
Sharma married Arpita Khan, the younger adoptive sister of Salman Khan on 18 November 2014. They have a son, Ahil (born 30 March 2016), and a daughter, Ayat (born 27 December 2019).

== Filmography ==
=== Films ===
Year	Title	Role	Notes	Ref.
2018	Loveyatri	Sushrut "Susu" Pandya	Debut Film	
2021	Antim: The Final Truth	Rahul "Rahulia" Patil		
2024	Ruslaan	Ruslaan		
TBA	Kwatha †	TBA	Filming	

=== Music videos ===
Year	Title	Singer(s)	Ref.
2020	"Manjha"	Vishal Mishra	
2022	"Pehli Pehli Baarish"	Yasser Desai	
2022	"Chumma Chumma"	Nakash Aziz, Neeti Mohan	
2023	"Tera Hoke Nachda Phira"	Stebin Ben	
2024	"Galti"	Vishal Mishra	

== Awards and nominations ==
Year	Film	Award	Category	Result	Ref.
2019	Loveyatri	Zee Cine Awards	Best Debut – Male	Nominated	

== See also ==
- List of Bollywood actors
