= Rakesh Jamwal =

Indian politician

Rakesh Jamwal (born 21 June 1974) is an Indian politician from Himachal Pradesh. He is a Member of the Legislative Assembly from Sundernagar Assembly constituency in Mandi district. He won the 2022 Himachal Pradesh Legislative Assembly election representing the Bharatiya Janata Party.

== Early life and education ==
Jamwal was born to Ram Dei and Hardyal Singh in Pungh village, Mandi district. He married Manu Jamwal and together they have a son. He completed his graduation in 2010 at Vinayaka MissionsUniversity, Salem, Tamil Nadu.

== Career ==
Jamwal won from Sundernagar Assembly constituency representing the Bharatiya Janata Party in 2017 and in 2022 Himachal Pradesh Legislative Assembly election. He polled 29,432 votes and defeated his nearest rival, Sohan Lal of the Indian National Congress for the second time, by a margin of 8,125 votes. Earlier in 2017, he beat Lal by 9,263 votes.
