= Janak Raj (politician) =

Indian politician

Member of the Himachal Pradesh Legislative Assembly
- Incumbent
- Assumed office 8 December 2022
- Succeeded by: 15 August 1979 (age 47)
- Constituency: Bharmour Assembly constituency

Personal details
- Born: 15 August 1979 (age 47)
- Party: Bharatiya Janata Party
- Spouse: Kiran
- Children: 2
- Parent: Ravinder Kumar (father)
- Education: Benaras Hindu University; Indira Gandhi Medical College and Hospital; Jawahar Navodya Vidyalaya Shegaon
- Occupation: Politician
- Profession: Doctor

Janak Raj is an Indian politician who is the MLA for the Bharmour constituency in the Himachal Pradesh Legislative Assembly. He was elected at the December 2022 Legislative Assembly election.

Raj is uncle of Thakur Singh Bharmouri whom he defeated Indian National Congress leader and former minister.

Raj is a neurosurgeon by profession. He served as the medical superintendent of Indira Gandhi Medical College and Hospital, Shimla.

== Early life and education ==
Born on 15 August 1979, in Bharmour, Distt. Chamba, Himachal Pradesh, Raj is the son of Reshmo Devi and Ravinder Kumar. He received his early education at Jawahar Navodya Vidyalaya in Sarol, Distt. Chamba, and later at Jawahar Navodya Vidyalaya in Shegaon, Maharashtra, under the National Integration Programme.

Raj holds degrees in MBBS, MS (General Surgery) from IGMC Shimla, and M.Ch. Neurosurgery from Benaras Hindu University.

== Career ==
Before opting for Voluntary Retirement on 18 October 2022 from the Medical Education Department (H.P. Government), Raj held various positions, including Medical Officer (2009-2014), Assistant Professor in Neurosurgery (2014-2019), Associate Professor in Neurosurgery (2019-2021), Professor in Neurosurgery (2021-2022), and Senior Medical Superintendent at IGMC (2018-2022).

== Personal life ==
Married to Kiran, Raj is father of one son and one daughter.

== Political involvement ==
Raj ventured into politics and was elected to the State Legislative Assembly in December 2022. He has been nominated as a Member of the Public Accounts & Ethics Committees, contributing his expertise to governance.

Raj has a special interest in the health sector, education, and tribal affairs, reflecting his commitment to community welfare.
