= Amit Bhatt =

Indian television actor (born 1973)

- Born: 19 August 1972 (age 54); Rajula Taluka,Saurashtra, Gujarat, India
- Occupations: Actor; Comedian
- Known for: Taarak Mehta Ka Ooltah Chashmah
- Spouse: Kruti Bhatt (m. 1999)
- Children: 2

Amit Bhatt (Hindi: अमित भट्ट; born 19 August 1972) is an Indian actor. He is a well-known figure in Gujarati theatre and television, appearing in a number of Hindi television serials including the popular Indian television show Taarak Mehta Ka Ooltah Chashmah, portraying Champaklal Jayantilal Gada.

== Education and personal life ==
Bhatt holds a bachelor's degree in Commerce (B.Com).

He is married to Kruti Bhatt, a nutritionist and dietician, and has twin sons. They live in Mumbai, Maharashtra. He is known to keep his family life relatively private.

== Career ==
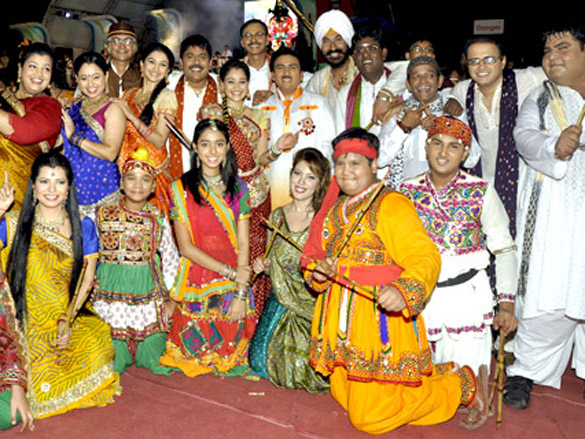
Amit Bhatt with the cast of Taarak Mehta Ka Ooltah Chashmah

Bhatt has had a background in theater, having over 16 years of experience in Gujarati theater. He has appeared in various television serials, such as Khichdi, Yes Boss, Chupke Chupke, F.I.R., and CID. He also made a cameo appearance in the Indian film Loveyatri (2018), along with his twin sons.

Bhatt's portrayal of Champaklal Gada is his most recognized work, making him a household name.

== Filmography ==
=== Film ===
Year	Film	Role
2009	Dhoondte Reh Jaaoge	
2018	Loveyatri	Cameo

=== Television ===
Year	Serial	Role
1998	CID	Drunkard
2003–2004	Khichdi	Various characters
2004	Hum Sab Baraati	Kachra
2006–2007	F.I.R.	Various characters
2008–present	Taarak Mehta Ka Ooltah Chashmah	Champaklal Jayantilal Gada / Jayantilal Girdharlal Gada

== Awards and nominations ==
Year	Award	Category	Results
2018	Indian Television Academy Awards	Best actor in a Comic Role	Won
2019	Indian Telly Awards	Best Ensemble (fiction)	Won
2019	Indian Telly Awards	Best actor in a Comic Role	Won
2022	Indian Television Academy Awards	Best actor in a Comic Role (popular)	Won
