= Inder Singh Gandhi =

Indian politician

Member of the Himachal Pradesh Legislative Assembly
- Incumbent
- Assumed office 2017
- Preceded by: Prakash Chaudhary
- Constituency: Balh

Personal details
- Born: 1962 (age 63–64) Khandla village, Mandi district, Himachal Pradesh
- Party: Bharatiya Janata Party

Inder Singh Gandhi (born 1962) is an Indian politician from Himachal Pradesh. He is a member of the Himachal Pradesh Legislative Assembly from Balh Assembly constituency in Mandi district. He won the 2022 Himachal Pradesh Legislative Assembly election representing the Bharatiya Janata Party.

== Early life and education ==
Singh was born in Khandla village, Mandi district, Himachal Pradesh. He is the son of late Gandhi Ram. He studied Class 10 at Government School, Dhangayara, and passed the examinations conducted by the Himachal Pradesh Board of School Education in 1981. In 1983, he also did a diploma as a surveyor, Industrial Training Institute, Shahpur.

== Career ==
Singh won from Balh Assembly constituency representing the Bharatiya Janata Party in the 2022 Himachal Pradesh Legislative Assembly election. He polled 31,792 votes and defeated his nearest rival and former minister, Prakash Chaudhary of the Indian National Congress, by a margin of 1,307 votes. He first became an MLA winning the 2017 Himachal Pradesh Legislative Assembly election. He defeated Chaudhary of Congress by a margin of 12,811 votes.
