= Anil Sharma (Himachal Pradesh politician) =

Indian politician

Cabinet Minister Government of Himachal Pradesh
- In office 27 December 2017 – 12 April 2019
- Governor: Acharya Devvrat; Kalraj Mishra; Bandaru Dattatreya; Rajendra Arlekar
- Cabinet: Jai Ram Thakur ministry
- Chief Minister: Jai Ram Thakur
- Ministry and Departments: Power & Non Conventional Energy; Multi Purpose Projects

Member of the Himachal Pradesh Legislative Assembly
- Incumbent
- Assumed office 31 December 2007
- Preceded by: Sukh Ram
- Constituency: Mandi
- In office 11 September 1993 – 28 February 1998
- Preceded by: Kanhaiya Lal
- Succeeded by: Sukh Ram
- Constituency: Mandi

Member of Parliament In Rajya Sabha
- In office 3 April 1998 – 2 April 2004
- Preceded by: Maheshwar Singh
- Succeeded by: Anand Sharma
- Constituency: Himachal Pradesh

Personal details
- Born: 30 June 1956 (age 69) Kullu, Himachal Pradesh, India
- Party: Bharatiya Janata Party
- Other political affiliations: Indian National Congress; Himachal Vikas Congress
- Spouse: Sunita Sharma
- Children: 2 (including Aayush Sharma)
- Parent: Pandit Sukh Ram (father)
- Education: B.Sc. (Dairy Technology)
- Profession: Agriculturist; Politician; Businessperson

Anil Sharma (born 30 June 1956) is an Indian politician, agriculturist and businessman from Himachal Pradesh. He was elected to the Himachal Pradesh Legislative Assembly from Mandi as a member of the Indian National Congress in 1993, 2007, and 2012 and as a member of the Bharatiya Janata Party in 2017. He is also the father of actor Aayush Sharma and son of Pandit Sukh Ram.

== Early life and family ==
Born on 30 June 1956, in Sultanpur, Kullu, Anil Sharma is the son of Ram Devi and Sukh Ram, a former Union and State Government Minister. He completed his education in B.A. and B.Sc. (Dairy & Technology) at institutions in Shimla, Chandigarh, and Allahabad Agriculture Institute.

Anil Sharma is married to Sunita Sharma, and the couple has two sons. He is actively involved in agriculture, horticulture, and business.

== Political journey ==
Anil Sharma's political journey has been marked by significant contributions. He served as a Member of the Rajya Sabha from 1998 to 2004 as an HVC nominee. During this tenure, he was a member of various committees, including the Railway Convention Committee and Committees related to Food, Civil Supplies, Public Distribution, Communication, and Information Technology.

He was elected to the State Legislative Assembly multiple times - in November 1993, December 2007, 2012 as an Indian National Congress nominee, and in 2017 as a BJP candidate.

== Ministerial roles ==
Throughout his political career, Anil Sharma held various ministerial positions, including Minister of State for Youth Services, Sports, and Forest from 1993 to 1996. He also served as the Chief Whip of the Congress Legislature Party from 2008 to 2012 and as the General Secretary of the Himachal Pradesh Congress Committee from March 2008 to 2012.

In 2012, Anil Sharma took on the role of Rural Development & Panchayati Raj Minister, and from 2017 to 2019, he served as the Minister of Multi-Purpose Projects, Power, and Non-Conventional Energy Sources in the Jai Ram Thakur cabinet.

== Political achievements ==
Elected to the State Legislative Assembly for the fifth term in December 2022, Anil Sharma was nominated as the Chairman of the Public Accounts Committee and a Member of the General Development & Ethics Committees.

== Personal life ==
Anil Sharma comes from a prominent political family, being the son of Sukh Ram, former Minister of Communications and Information Technology from 1993 to 1996. His son Aashray Sharma was given ticket from Mandi Lok Sabha seat. His other son Aayush Sharma is married to Salman Khan's sister Arpita.
