= Mansa Ram =

Indian politician (1940–2023)

Member of the Himachal Pradesh Legislative Assembly
- In office 2012–2017
- Preceded by: Hira Lal
- Succeeded by: Hira Lal
- Constituency: Karsog
- In office 1998–2003
- Preceded by: Mast Ram
- Succeeded by: Mast Ram
- Constituency: Karsog
- In office 1982–1985
- Preceded by: Joginder Pal
- Succeeded by: Joginder Pal
- Constituency: Karsog
- In office 1967–1977
- Preceded by: Rattan Singh
- Succeeded by: Joginder Pal
- Constituency: Karsog

Personal details
- Born: 30 May 1940 Karsog, Mandi State, British Raj
- Died: 14 January 2023 (aged 82) Shimla, Himachal Pradesh, India
- Party: Indian National Congress
- Occupation: Politician

Mansa Ram (30 May 1940 – 14 January 2023) was an Indian politician and member of the Indian National Congress. Mansa Ram was a member of the Himachal Pradesh Legislative Assembly from the Karsog constituency in Mandi district.

== Death ==
Ram died from kidney failure on 14 January 2023, at the age of 82.
