= Kotli, Himachal Pradesh =

Village in Himachal Pradesh, India

Kotli
- Town
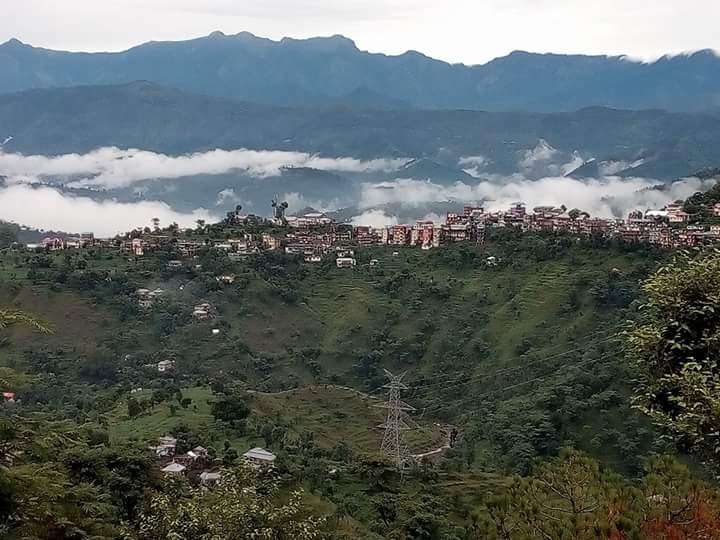
- A view from NH70 New(003)
- Nickname: Kotli
- Location in Himachal Pradesh, India Kotli (India)
- Coordinates: 31.756957°N 76.872857°E
- Country: India
- State: Himachal Pradesh
- District: Mandi
- Sub Division: Kotli
- Tehsil: Kotli

Government
  - Body: Village Panchayat

Population (2011)
  - Total: 25,860

Languages
  - Official: Hindi
  - Native: Mandeali
- Time zone: UTC+5:30 (IST)
- PIN: 175003
- Telephone code: 01905281
- Vehicle registration: HP 33AA
- Major Highways: NH 3, MDR 57
- Nearest city: Mandi
- Lok Sabha constituency: Mandi
- Vidhan Sabha constituency: Mandi

Kotli Tungal also known as Kotli is a small town in Mandi district of Himachal Pradesh, in northern India located along National Highway 3 which connects Jalandhar to Mandi. It is 22 km (14 mi) from the town of Mandi. Kotli is a sub division and a Tehsil of Mandi District. Kotli and the surrounding area are also known as Tungal Valley. The center of Tungal Valley is Kotli, where The NH 3 from Manali to Jalandhar passes through Kotli. Tungal Valley is covered with lush green forests of Oak and Cedar Deodar. Rechara Dev Temple, Mahan Dev Temple, Kali Mata Temple, Janitri Mata Temple, Nagan Mata Mandir, Jhumba Ri Jogni Mata Temple are the main temples of the area. Jhumba Dhar located at an altitude of 2,100 m (6,900 ft) from sea level is height peak of the area. Mandeali and Hindi are spoken.

== Patwar Circle in Sub Division Kotli ==
Patwar Circle in Kotli Tehsil
Sai	Kutli	Khadkalyana	Selhi	Nalsan	Karkoh	Barnota	Khalanu
Drubal	Kot	Samrahan	Bhargaon	Dawahan	Kotli	Surari	

== Gram Panchyat Under Sub Division and Tehsil Kotli ==
Gram Panchyat under Kotli Tehsil
Kotli	Baggi Tungal	Bhargaon	Dawahan	Drubal	Dhaniyara	Dandhal	Kot Tungal
Khalanu	Lagdhar	Kasan	Lot	Sai	Surari	Sehli	Sadoh
Tarnoh							

== Villages in Kotli Tehsil ==
villages in Kotli Tehsil
Alag	Arnodi	Arthi	Badgaon	Badyar	Baggi	Balahar	Banog	
Barnota	Baroha	Batahar	Batour	Bhargaon	Chaloh DPF	Nagan		
Drubal	Dawahan	Dhalwani	Dhandhal	Dhaniara	Dhawali Badehar	Dhawansari	Fagla	
Gharaun	Hart	Jalaun	Jandroha	Kalag	Kalgraun	Kalothar	Kasan	
Kasan	Khad Khalyana	Khalanoo	Kot	Kotli	Kun	Kusmal	Kutli	
Lagdhar	Laswai Khad	Luharad	Mahan	Mandhokhar	Nalsan	Ropa Matyhal	Ropru	
Sadoh	Sai	Sain	Sakswal	Samrahan	Saploh	Sarwahan	Surari Buhnli	Surari Uparli
Satahan	Satohal	Sehli	Sikan	sukshal	Tarnoh	Taryasal	Thanaut	

== Education ==
- Government Degree College Kotli
- Government Industrial Training Institute Kotli

== Access ==
Kotli Tungal is well connected by National Highway 3 with district headquarters Mandi and Manali.

- Distance from Shimla: 147 km (91 mi)
- Distance from Delhi: 451 km (280 mi)
- Distance from Chandigarh: 215 km (134 mi)
- Distance from Mandi: 22 km (14 mi)
