= Maheshwar Singh (Kullu politician) =

Indian politician

Maheshwar Singh is an Indian politician and a member of the Bhartiya Janta Party (BJP). He served as a member of the Himachal Pradesh Legislative Assembly from the Kullu and Banjar constituencies in Kullu district. Additionally, he is the owner of Lord Raghunath Temple at Kullu as a scion of the erstwhile Kullu princely state. Singh has been a former member of the Lok Sabha (the lower house of the Indian Parliament) three times and the Rajya Sabha (the upper house of the Indian Parliament) once.
