= Tulsi Ram =

Indian politician (died 2020)

Pandit Tulsi Ram Sharma (1943/44 – 16 November 2020) was an Indian politician who served as the speaker of Himachal Pradesh Legislative Assembly in India. He was elected as MLA from Bharmour constituency on ticket of Bharatiya Janata Party in 1990, 1998 and 2007. He was unanimously elected to the office of Speaker on 11 January 2008 to Dec. 2012.

== Earlier Life ==
Pandit Tulsi Ram was basically from Bharmour and also priest of the 84 temples. Tulsi Ram's father Ram sh. Changga Ram was a carpenter. Tusli Ram started his journey from poor family. At the age of 18 he started job as a clerk before tehsildar office and after long period of service, 19 years 7 months, he quit his job and started his career in politics.

== Personal Interest ==
Interest of Pandit Tulsi Ram was in agriculture and horticulture. He made many reforms in the field of Agriculture and Horticulture. He introduced much modern equipment in the society which was imported from foreign countries.

== Family ==
Tulsi Ram was married to Late Sankutla Devi and Leela Devi and they have four children Harisaran Sharma, Sanjeev Kumar, Rakhi Sharma and Sushma Sharma. He also has 6 grandchildren.
