= Hira Lal (politician) =

Indian politician (born 1966)

MLA, Himachal Pradesh Legislative Assembly
- In office 2017–2022
- Preceded by: Mansa Ram
- Constituency: Karsog

Personal details
- Born: 16 April 1966 (age 59) Lalag, Mandi, Himachal Pradesh
- Party: Bharatiya Janta Party
- Parent: Surju Ram (father)

Hira Lal (born 16 April 1966) is an Indian politician, who currently serves as Member of Legislative Assembly from Karsog constituency. Hira Lal won from Karsog constituency in 2017 state assembly elections. He is two times Member of Himachal Pradesh Legislative Assembly.

== Early life and education ==
Hira Lal was born on 16 April 1966 in Lalag, Karsog, Mandi, Himachal Pradesh to Surju Ram.

He had (12th) secondary school education certificate.

== Politics ==
Hira Lal was active in local politics from 1996. While Lal's active state politics started from 2007.

He previously won Himachal Pradesh Legislative Assembly Election in 2007 as an independent candidate.

Then again with BJP in 2017, he was elected to the thirteenth Himachal Pradesh Legislative Assembly in December, 2017.
