= Himachal Vikas Congress =

- Abbreviation: HVC
- Founder: Sukh Ram; Anil Sharma
- Dissolved: 2004
- Split from: Indian National Congress
- Merged into: Indian National Congress
- ECI Status: Registered

Election symbol
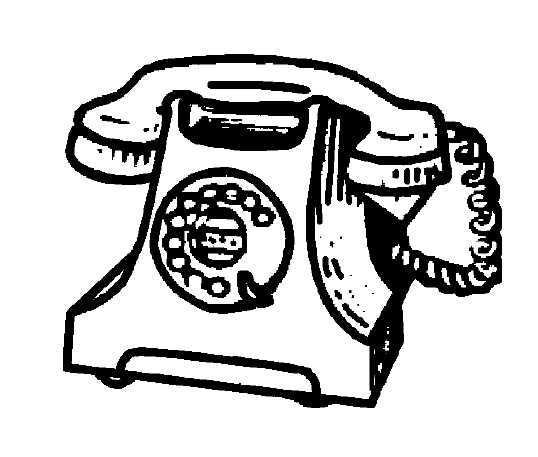

Himachal Vikas Congress (Himalayan Development Congress), was a regional political party in Himachal Pradesh, India.

== Formation ==
Himachal Vikas Congress was formed when Sukh Ram and Anil Sharma split from the Indian National Congress after were expelled from the Congress party after the telecom scam. Anil Sharma was elected to the Rajya Sabha in 1998 as member of Himachal Vikas Congress. Himachal Vikas Congress, entered into a post-poll alliance with the Bharatiya Janata Party and joined the government.

They won the five seats in 1998 Himachal Pradesh Legislative Assembly election and won seat of Sukh Ram in 2003 Himachal Pradesh Legislative Assembly election. Lt. Col. Dhani Ram Shandil won from Shimla in 2004 Indian general election

Himachal Vikas Congress merged with the Congress Party in 2004.

== Electoral results ==
=== 1998 Himachal election ===
#	Winner	Seat
1	Prakash Chaudhary	Balh
2	Mahender Singh	Dharampur
3	Mansa Ram	Karsog
4	Ram Lal Markanda	Lahaul and Spiti
5	Sukh Ram	Mandi

=== 2003 Himachal election ===
Winner	Seat
Sukh Ram	Mandi

=== 2004 Indian general election ===
Winner	Seat
Lt. Col. Dhani Ram Shandil	Shimla

== See also ==
- Indian National Congress breakaway parties
