= Singhi Ram =

Indian politician

Singhi Ram is an Indian politician and civil servant who formerly served as Minister for Food and Civil Supplies from Himachal in the Union Council of Ministers. Ram was born at Rampur, District Shimla on 7 May 1954. He earned a B.A. degree from Government College, Rampur and LL.B from Faculty of Law, Himachal Pradesh University, Shimla.

== Career ==
He resigned from government services to take an active part in electoral politics. He also worked as an advocate for Scheduled Castes and Scheduled Tribes. He remained General Secretary of State Youth Congress from 1983 to 1985. He was the Vice President of State Youth Congress from 1986 to 1987. He was also the Joint Secretary of the Pradesh Congress Committee.
Ram was elected to the State Legislative Council in 1982 and again in 1985, 1990, 1993, 1998, and 2003. During his tenure in the State Legislative Council, Ram served as Chairman of the Committee on Welfare of Scheduled Castes and Scheduled Tribes. He is the member of Committees on Public Accounts, Public Undertakings, Estimates, Subordinate Legislation, Papers Laid and Housing. He was also the Chairman of the Kerala State Civil Supplies Corporation.
