= List of people from Himachal Pradesh =

This is a list of notable people from Himachal Pradesh, India.

== Arts ==
- Baba Kanshi Ram - poet and independence activist
- Chandradhar Sharma Guleri - writer and scholar
- Gambhari Devi - folk singer and folklorist
- Gautam Chand Sharma 'Vyathit' - folklorist, poet, writer
- Kanwar Dinesh Singh - writer and poet
- H.R. Harnot - writer
- Kamayani Bisht - poet and actor
- Nainsukh - painter of Kangra school of painting
- Siddharth Chauhan - filmmaker
- Nirmal Verma - writer
- Ram Kumar - painter
- Shriniwas Joshi - writer and theatre artist
- Siddharth Pandey - writer, photographer, musician
- Vijay Sharma - painter and art historian

== Business ==
- M S Banga

== Defence ==
=== Awardees of the Param Vir Chakra and equivalent awards ===
- Major Som Nath Sharma - the first ever Param Vir Chakra awardee (1950)
- Lieutenant Colonel Dhan Singh Thapa - Param Vir Chakra awardee (1962)
- Captain Vikram Batra - Param Vir Chakra awardee (1999)
- Rifleman Sanjay Kumar - Param Vir Chakra awardee (1999)
- Major Sudhir Kumar Walia - Ashoka Chakra awardee (1999)
- Jemadar Lala, Victoria Cross awardee (1916)
- Honorary Captain Bhandari Ram - Victoria Cross awardee (1945)

=== Awardees of the Maha Vir Chakra and equivalent awards ===
- Major General Anant Singh Pathania, MVC, MC - decorated WWII and Indo-Pak War (1947-49) veteran
- Brigadier Sher Jung Thapa, MVC - 'The Hero of Skardu' in the Indo-Pak War (1947-48)
- Colonel Thakur Prithi Chand, MVC - the defence of Ladakh during the Indo-Pak War (1947-48)
- Lt. Col. Kushal Chand, MVC - the defence of Ladakh during the Indo-Pak War (1947-48)
- Lieutenant General Ranjit Singh Dyal, MVC, PVSM - Indo-Pak War (1965) veteran
- Brigadier Rattan Nath Sharma, MVC - decorated Indo-Pak War (1965) and Indo-Pak War (1971) veteran

=== Other notable defence personnel ===
- Major General Siri Kanth Korla, PVSM, DSO, MC - decorated WWII and Indo-Pak War (1965) veteran
- Subedar Major and Hony Captain Bhim Chand, VrC & bar - the defence of Ladakh during the Indo-Pak War (1947-48)
- Group Captain Virendera Singh Pathania VrC, Vayusena Medal - first IAF pilot to make a confirmed kill of a Pakistani jet in independent India; veteran of the 1962, 1965, and 1971 wars
- General Vishwa Nath Sharma, PVSM, AVSM, ADC - 14th Chief of the Army Staff in the Indian Army (1988-1990)
- Lt. Saurabh Kalia - PoW in the Kargil War (1999)
- Subedar Major and Hony Captain Chhering Norbu Bodh, SC - Mountaineer (1990s-2000s)

== Historians from Himachal pradesh ==
- Bipan Chandra
- Chetan Singh
- Hari Sen
- Mian Goverdhan Singh
- Om Chand Handa
- Raaja Bhasin
- Tobdan
- Tshering Dorje

== Judicial ==
- Sanjay Karol is the sitting Judge of Supreme Court of India.
- Mehr Chand Mahajan was the third Chief Justice of the Supreme Court of India.
- Deepak Gupta (judge) is a former Judge of the Supreme Court of India.
- Lokeshwar Singh Panta is a former Judge of the Supreme Court of India and was the first chairperson of the National Green Tribunal.
- Abhilasha Kumari is a former first female Chief Justice on the Manipur High Court in 2018.

== Entertainment and Television ==
- Adarsh Rathore - Journalist and Singer
- Anuj Sharma - Singer
- Anupam Kher - Bollywood Actor
- Ashish R Mohan - Film Director
- Asmita Sood - Television Actress
- B. R. Ishara- Bollywood Director and Script Writer
- Kangana Ranawat - Bollywood actress
- Manohar Singh - Theatre and Bollywood Actor
- Mohit Chauhan - Playback Singer
- Motilal - Bollywood Actor
- Mrinal Navell - Television Actress
- Neeraj Sood - Bollywood Actor
- Preity Zinta - Bollywood actress
- Prem Chopra - Bollywood Actor
- Priya Rajvansh - Bollywood actress
- Purva Rana - Model
- Ravi Bhatia - Television Actor
- Richa Rathore - Television Actress
- Rubina Dilaik - Television Actress
- Savi Thakur - Television Actor
- Sahher Bambba - Bollywood actress
- Shipra Khanna - Chef
- Shivya Pathania - Television Actress
- Shriya Sharma - Film Actress
- Siddharth Chauhan - Screenwriter, Director
- Vishal Karwal - Television Actor
- Yami Gautam - Bollywood Actress

== Politicians ==
=== Chief Ministers ===
- Yashwant Singh Parmar, the founder of the Himachal Pradesh state and its first chief minister (1952-1956; 1963-1977)
- Thakur Ram Lal (1977; 1980-1983)
- Shanta Kumar (1977-1980; 1990-1992)
- Virbhadra Singh (1983-1985; 1985-1990; 1993-1998; 2003-2007; 2012-2017)
- Prem Kumar Dhumal (1998-2003; 2008-2012)
- Jai Ram Thakur (2017-2022)
- Sukhvinder Singh Sukhu (2022–present)
- List of chief ministers of Himachal Pradesh

=== Present and ex Union Ministers ===
- Jagat Prakash Nadda Union Minister of Health and Family Welfare
- Anurag Thakur
- Anand Sharma
- Chandresh Kumari Katoch
- Sukh Ram
- Shanta Kumar
- Virbhadra Singh

=== Other politicians from Himachal Pradesh ===
- Govind Singh Thakur
- Asha Kumari
- Balak Ram Kashyap
- Brij Behari Lal Butail
- Chander Kumar
- G. S. Bali
- Jai Bihari Lal Khachi
- Jagdev Chand Thakur
- Kaul Singh Thakur
- Khimi ram
- Kishan Kapoor
- Lata Thakur
- Mahender Singh
- Mukesh Agnihotri
- Phunchog Rai
- Pratibha Singh
- Rajeev Bindal
- Dr. Salig Ram
- Satpal Singh Satti
- Sukh Ram
- Thakur Devi Singh
- Thakur Sen Negi
- Vidya Stokes
- Vikramaditya Singh (Himachal Pradesh politician)

== Himachalis outside India ==
- Gaurav Sharma (politician) - medical doctor and MP in New Zealand
- Jay Chaudhry - CEO and founder of Zscaler a Nasdaq listed company in USA

== Science and Education ==
- Dr Randeep Guleria - Padma Shri, exDirector AIIMS New Delhi and Professor and Department Head of Pulmonary Disease and Sleeping Disorders
- Dr Jagat Ram - Padma Shri, ophthalmologist and Director PGI Chandigarh
- Dr Mahesh Verma - Padma Shri, Vice Chancellor Guru Gobind Singh Indraprastha University
- Dr D.S. Rana - Padma Shri, nephrologist and chairman, Board of Management, Sir Ganga Ram Hospital (India) New Delhi
- Dr Jagdev Guleria - Padma Shri
- Dr Omesh Kumar Bharti - Padma Shri
- Arvind Mohan Kayastha - biologist
- Anand Mohan - geologist, petrologist
- R.C. Sawhney - scientist, professor
- T. R. Sharma - plant biologist, educator
- Vijay Kumar Thakur - engineer and nano-technologist
- Munmun Dhalaria - documentary filmmaker
- Bittu Sehgal - nature conservationist and writer

== Sports ==
- Ajay Thakur - kabaddi player
- Ashish Kumar - Silver medalist in Asian Games in boxing 2019
- Charanjit Singh - Hockey (1964 Olympics)
- Chuni Lal Thakur - Winter Olympian
- Deepak Thakur - Hockey
- Dicky Dolma - Mountaineer
- Hira Lal - Winter Olympian
- Manavjit Singh Sandhu - Sports Shooter
- Manvinder Bisla - cricketer
- Nanak Chand Thakur- Winter Olympian
- Paras Dogra - Cricketer
- Renuka Singh - Cricketer (India women's national cricket team)
- Rishi Dhawan - Cricketer
- Samaresh Jung - Sports Shooter
- Shiva Keshavan - Luge (Winter Olympian)
- Skalzang Dorje - Archery (1996 Olympics)
- Suman Rawat - Track and field athlete
- Sushma Verma - Cricketer (India women's national cricket team)
- The Great Khali - Wrestler and Bollywood Actor
- Vijay Kumar - Sports Shooter

== Religion ==
- Khunu Lama Tenzin Gyaltsen - Buddhist teacher and scholar
- Thakur Ram Singh - RSS and Akhil Bharatiya Itihas Sankalan

== Non-Himachalis with significant contributions to HP ==
- Amrita Sher-Gil - painter
- Bhabesh Chandra Sanyal - painter
- Brijinder Nath Goswamy - art historian
- Didi Contractor - architect
- Harish Kapadia - mountaineer and writer
- Helena Roerich - philosopher and explorer
- Kirin Narayan - anthropologist
- Manohar Singh Gill - administrator, politician, and writer
- Mohan Singh Oberoi - hotelier
- Mohinder Singh Randhawa - art historian
- Norah Richards - theatre
- Nicholas Roerich - painter, philosopher, explorer
- Penelope Chetwode - travel writer
- Rahul Sankrityayan - scholar and travel writer
- Samuel Bourne - early photographer
- Satyananda Stokes - orchardist
- Sobha Singh - painter
- Svetsolav Roerich - painter
- Tenzin Gyatso - the fourteenth Dalai Lama
- Tenzin Palmo - Buddhist nun and activist
- Timothy A. Gonsalves - academic, entrepreneur
- Yeshi Dhonden - Sowa Rigpa doctor

== Miscellaneous ==
- Sansar Chand - ruler of Kangra in the 18th and early 19th centuries
- Seu - exponent of Kangra painting and father of Nainsukh(late 17th - early 18th cent.)
- Nainsukh - exponent of Kangra painting (18th cent.)
- Manaku - exponent of Kangra painting and brother of Nainsukh (18th cent.)
- Kinkri Devi - activist and environmentalist
- Shyam Saran Negi - India's first voter
- Zorawar Singh Kahluria - general of the Dogra army in the first half of the 19th century
- Narain Chand Parashar - linguist, cultural historian, and politician
- Pelden Gyeltshen - the 40th Ganden Tripa (17th century)
