= Mian Goverdhan Singh =

Indian writer and librarian (1928-2003)

- Born: 8 August 1928; Shadi, Jubbal, Himachal Pradesh, India
- Died: 1 March 2003 (aged 74)
- Education: Panjab University (BA in Library Service, 1955)
- Occupations: Writer, Librarian
- Years active: 1955–1988
- Employer(s): State Secretariat Library, Shimla
- Known for: Books on history, cultural traditions, and historic architecture of Himachal Pradesh; facilitating research for scholars
- Spouse: Tikam Devi

Mian Goverdhan Singh (8 August 1928 – 1 March 2003) was a writer and librarian from Himachal Pradesh, India. He is noted for his books on the history, cultural traditions, and historic architectures of Himachal Pradesh. He is also known for having facilitated the research for a number of well-known books, both during and after his tenure as librarian at the State Secretariat Library in Shimla, Himachal Pradesh.

== Life and career ==
Mian Goverdhan Singh was born on 8 August 1928 at village Shadi in the erstwhile princely state of Jubbal, located in the southern parts of the present-day Himachal Pradesh state. His father, Mian Joban Das, was a 'vakil' (lawyer) to the Raja of Jubbal. Singh passed out with a BA in Library Service from Panjab University in 1955. He was married to Tikam Devi. He served as a librarian, and later as Chief Librarian, at the State Secretariat Library at Shimla for over three decades, till his retirement in October 1988. Singh was instrumental in the development of this library. There, Singh guided and facilitated the research for a number of academic scholars and other writers. He wrote several books on the history, cultural traditions, historic architecture, and economy of Himachal Pradesh. Singh died on 1 March 2003.

== Awards and other recognition ==
- In 1986, Singh was awarded the first ever Dr. Yashwant Singh Parmar State Honour, by the Government of Himachal Pradesh.
- In 1996, Singh was awarded the 'Shikhar Samman' by the Himachal Pradesh Academy.
- Singh's book Art and Architecture of Himachal Pradesh (1983) has a Foreword by the British travel writer Penelope Chetwode. Chetwode's grand-daughter, Imogen Lycett Green, notes that Singh was a friend and facilitator for Chetwode's research in the Himalayas of Himachal Pradesh.
- Singh's book Festivals, Fairs, and Customs of Himachal Pradesh (1992) has introductory notes by the Himachali historian O.C. Handa. The chapter 'Folkdances' in Handa's own book Western Himalayan Folk Arts (2006) begins with an anecdote related to Singh and his home in Jubbal.
- Mark Elmore calls Singh's book Festivals, Fairs, and Customs of Himachal Pradesh a classic work on these subjects, in his book Becoming Religious in a Secular Age (2016).
- V. Verma dedicated his book Shimla Hill States in the 19th Century (2008) to Singh.
- Singh was among the deceased litterateurs of Himachal honored and commemorated at an event organized by the Himachal Academy and Accord India and supervised by S.R. Harnot in Shimla, over 25 December 2021 till 2 January 2022.
- A number of writers on Shimla and Himachal Pradesh have acknowledged Singh's singular contributions towards facilitating the research for their books or articles, and guiding them to rare and obscure materials. This list includes, among many others, Sir Patrick Leigh Fermor (1979), Raaja Bhasin (1992), Chetan Singh (1998), and Mark Brentnall (2004).
- The book Himachal - Past, Present & Future (1975), which contains three chapters by Singh, has been archived online by archive.org.

== Controversy ==
Singh's English-language book Himachal Pradesh: History, Culture, and Economic Condition was in controversy in August 2021, over its allegedly derogatory remarks on Gurjar women. On 16 August, members of the Gurjar community protested against the book in Mandi, seeking a withdrawal of the book by the Government of Himachal Pradesh. On 19 August, the Gurjar community protested at Anandpur Sahib, seeking a withdrawal of the book by the Government of Himachal Pradesh and legal action against its publisher, the Minerva Book House of Shimla. Soon afterwards, the Shiromani Akali Dal sought the arrest of the book's 'author' and the 'translator'. Singh had died in 2003, and the book had no translator as it had originally been in English. However, 'translator' seemingly referred to C.L. Gupta, who had revised the book for its 2016 reprint. From that period on, as of February 2023, the media had no further coverage on this subject.

== Bibliography ==
- Singh, Mian Goverdhan. (1982). Art and Architecture of Himachal Pradesh. Delhi: B.R. Publishing Corporation.
- Singh, Mian Goverdhan. (1992). Himachal Pradesh: History, Culture, and Economy. Shimla: Minerva Book House.
- Singh, Mian Goverdhan. (1992). Festivals, Fairs, and Customs of Himachal Pradesh. Delhi: Indus Publishing Company.
- Singh, Mian Goverdhan. (1996). Himachal Pradesh ka Itihas (in Hindi). Reliance Publishing House.
- Singh, Mian Goverdhan. (1999). Wooden Temples of Himachal Pradesh. Delhi: Indus Publishing Company.
- Negi, J. and Singh, Mian Goverdhan. (1999). Himachal Pradesh: Ek Etihasik Sarvekshan (in Hindi).
