= Ravi Thakur (politician) =

Indian politician

Member of the Himachal Pradesh Legislative Assembly
- In office 2022–2024
- Preceded by: Ram Lal Markanda
- Succeeded by: Anuradha Rana
- Constituency: Lahaul and Spiti

Personal details
- Born: 1962 (age 63–64) Lahaul and Spiti district, Himachal Pradesh
- Party: Bharatiya Janata Party (2024-)
- Other political affiliations: Indian National Congress (till 2024)
- Education: Bachelor of Arts (University of Punjab)

Ravi Thakur (born 1962) is an Indian politician from Himachal Pradesh. He is an MLA from Lahaul and Spiti Assembly constituency, which is reserved for Scheduled Tribe community, in Lahoul and Spiti district. He won the 2022 Himachal Pradesh Legislative Assembly election representing the Indian National Congress and served till February 2024.

== Early life and education ==
Thakur is from Lahoul and Spiti, Himachal Pradesh. He is the son of Nihal Chand. He completed his BA in 1983 at Punjab University. He is a businessman and runs a hotel.

== Career ==
Thakur won from Lahoul and Spiti Assembly constituency representing the Indian National Congress in the 2022 Himachal Pradesh Legislative Assembly election. He polled 9,948 votes and defeated his nearest rival, Ram Lal Markanda of the Bharatiya Janata Party, by a margin of 1,616 votes. He lost the 2017 Himachal Pradesh Legislative Assembly election to Ram Lal Markanda of the Bharatiya Janata Party by a margin of 1,478 votes. In February 2024, he was disqualified along with five other Congress MLAs for cross voting for BJP in the Rajya Sabha election. He contested the by-election on the BJP ticket but came third behind winner Anuradha Rana of the Indian National Congress who defeated independent candidate Ram Lal Markanda, by a margin of 1,960 votes.
