= Kamayani Bisht =

Indian academician, poet, and actor

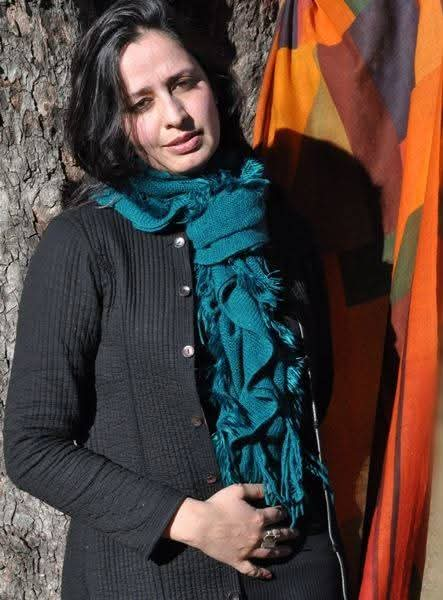
- Born: 20 August 1974 (age 52)
- Other name: Kamayani Vashisht
- Education: St. Bede's College; Himachal Pradesh University
- Occupations: Academician, Poetess, Actress
- Notable work: Poem collections: The Witch Must Die and Other Poems (2019); Recipe for Ladyfinger Pickle (2022); Short films: Boys Don't Wear Nailpolish (2013); Pashi (2017)
- Awards: Final shortlist, Sahitya Academy Award for Writing in English (2022)

Kamayani Bisht (born 20 August 1974), also known as Kamayani Vashisht, is an Indian academician, poet, and actor based in Shimla, Himachal Pradesh, India. She is noted for her poetry in English. Her anthology The Witch Must Die and Other Poems (2019) was in the final shortlist for the 'Sahitya Akademi Award for Writing in English (2022)', the Government of India's highest annual recognition for writing in the English language. She is also noted for her roles in Siddharth Chauhan's critically-acclaimed short films that explore queer issues.

== Education ==
Bisht did her undergraduate studies in English Literature at St. Bede's College, Shimla. She did her Masters and PhD in English Literature at the Himachal Pradesh University. The title of her doctoral degree, awarded in 2015–16, was The Evolving Matrices of Fantasy: Revisiting the Fairy Tales of Hans Christian Andersen and The Brothers Grimm.

== Career ==
=== Academic ===
Bisht currently serves as Principal, Centre of Excellence, Government College Sanjauli Shimla-06. She was the Principal of Jawahar Lal Nehru College of Fine Arts, Shimla, before this.

Earlier, she taught English at the Government College, Sanjauli, and the Government College, Theog.

=== Acting ===
Bisht played leading roles in two short films directed by Shimla-based director Siddharth Chauhan. These were Boys Don't Wear Nailpolish (2013) and Pashi (2017). In Boy's Don't Wear Nailpolish, Bisht plays a mother who stands up for her son's non-conventional masculinity. In the critically-acclaimed coming-of-age short-film Pashi, Bisht plays the mother of the protagonist Ashish, a young boy who struggles with homo-erotic feelings.

Others

Bisht has frequently been a speaker, moderator, anchor, or chief guest at scholarly, literary, artistic, and educational events in and around Shimla.

== Writing ==
Bisht's 2016 book Dioramas of Girlhood: The Faerie Recast draws inspiration from her doctoral research, and interrogates the traditional fairy tale characters of the heroine and the witch through a postmodern lens.

Bisht's 2019 poetry anthology The Witch Must Die and Other Poems has been positively reviewed for its feminist poems that posit women as active agents.

Reviewing Bisht's 2022 poetry anthology Recipe for Ladyfinger Pickle, Anupama Jaidev Karir of Delhi University remarks that the collection possesses richness, variety, authenticity, and candour. The themes covered by the poems here include "confessions and interlocutions, intergenerational mindscapes as well as myriad aspects of the interiority of [Bisht's] personae". Karir adds that the poems, even though abundant in metaphors and intertextual conversations with some literary greats (like Neruda and Angelou), still reveal a poetic voice that is consistently un-encumbered by any particular influence or thesis, and one which is self-possessed and often playful.

== Recognition ==
- In 2022, Bisht's The Witch Must Die was only poetry collection in the final shortlist for the 'Sahitya Academy Award for Writing in English', competing with the likes of Anuradha Roy's novel All The Lives We Never Lived, Basharat Peer's memoir Curfewed Night, and Devdutt Pattanaik's non-fiction book Devlok with Devdutt Pattanaik.

== Bibliography ==
- Bisht, Kamayani. 2016. Dioramas of Girlhood: The Faerie Recast. Notion Press.
- Bisht, Kamayani. 2019. The Witch Must Die and Other Poems. Authors Press.
- Bisht, Kamayani. 2022. Recipe for Ladyfinger Pickle: Poems. Red River.
