= D.A.V. College (Lahore), Ambala City =

D.A.V. College (Lahore), Ambala City is a college in Ambala, Haryana, India. It was started in 1886 in Lahore, Punjab Province (British India). After partition it moved to present campus of Ambala in 1948. It is affiliated to Kurukshetra University, Kurukshetra.

The former campus of the DAV College in Lahore became the Government Islamia College after the Partition of India.

== Notable alumni ==
- Ishwar Das Pawar
- I. K. Gujral
- Thakur Devi Singh
- Salig Ram (politician)
- Hargobind Khurana
- Krishan Kant
- R N Mittal
- Chetan Sharma
- Jagmohan Singh Kang
- Resham Singh Anmol
- Sahabji Maharaj
