= Barnaby Rogerson =

British author and television presenter (born 1960)

Barnaby Rogerson (born 17 May 1960) is a British author, television presenter and publisher. He has written extensively about the Muslim world, including a biography of the Islamic prophet Muhammad, and numerous travel guides.

Rogerson was born in Dunfermline, Scotland, and studied Medieval History at St Andrews University. He became a writer of guidebooks, to Morocco, Tunisia, Cyprus, Istanbul and Libya. He now lives in London with his wife and business partner, Rose Baring. Together they run Eland Books, a publishing company specialising in reprinting classics of travel writing.

He has worked as a lecturer for tour companies such as Martin Randall Travel, Eastern Approaches and Andante, and as a freelance travel writer he has written three hundred articles and reviews for the TLS, Guardian, Independent, House & Garden, Harpers & Queen, Cornucopia, Country Life and the Daily Telegraph.

Rogerson has also appeared as a television presenter, on the BBC programme Life of Muhammad, the Al Jazeera programme The Caliph. and Pilot productions Muslim Empire series.

== Books ==
Rogerson has written books.

- The House Divided: Sunni, Shia and the Making of the Middle East - Pegasus Books, 2024
- Don McCullin: Journeys Across Roman Asia Minor - Cornucopia Books, 2023
- The Prophet Muhammad: How Islam was Born: All you Need to Know series - Connell Guides, 2018
- In Search of Ancient North Africa: A History in Six Lives - Haus Publishing, 2017
- Rogerson's Book of Numbers: The culture of numbers from 1001 Nights to the Seven Wonders of the World - Profile, 2013
- The Last Crusaders: East, West and the Battle for the Centre of the World, 1415-1578 - Little, Brown 2009
- Southern Frontiers - a photographic book by Don McCullin; text written by Barnaby Rogerson - Jonathan Cape, 2010
- Heirs of the Prophet and the roots of the Sunni-Shia schism - Little, Brown, 2006
- The Prophet Muhammad: A Biography - Little, Brown, 2003
- A Traveller’s History of North Africa - Duckworth & Co Ltd, 2008; US Interlink, 2001; Windrush Press/Orion, 1998
- Marrakesh, through Writers' Eyes (editor), Eland, 2006
- Meetings with Remarkable Muslims (editor, with Rose Baring), Eland, 2005
- Morocco (guidebook) - Cadogan, 1989, updated editions 1994, 1998, 2000 and 2004
- Cyprus (guidebook) - Cadogan, 1994
- Tunisia - Cadogan 1992, updated edition in 1998
- Desert Air: A collection of the Poetry of Place: of Arabia, Deserts and the Orient of the Imagination (editor), Eland Books, 2007, 2001
- London, the Poetry of Place (editor), Eland Books, 2003
