= Raaja Bhasin =

Indian writer

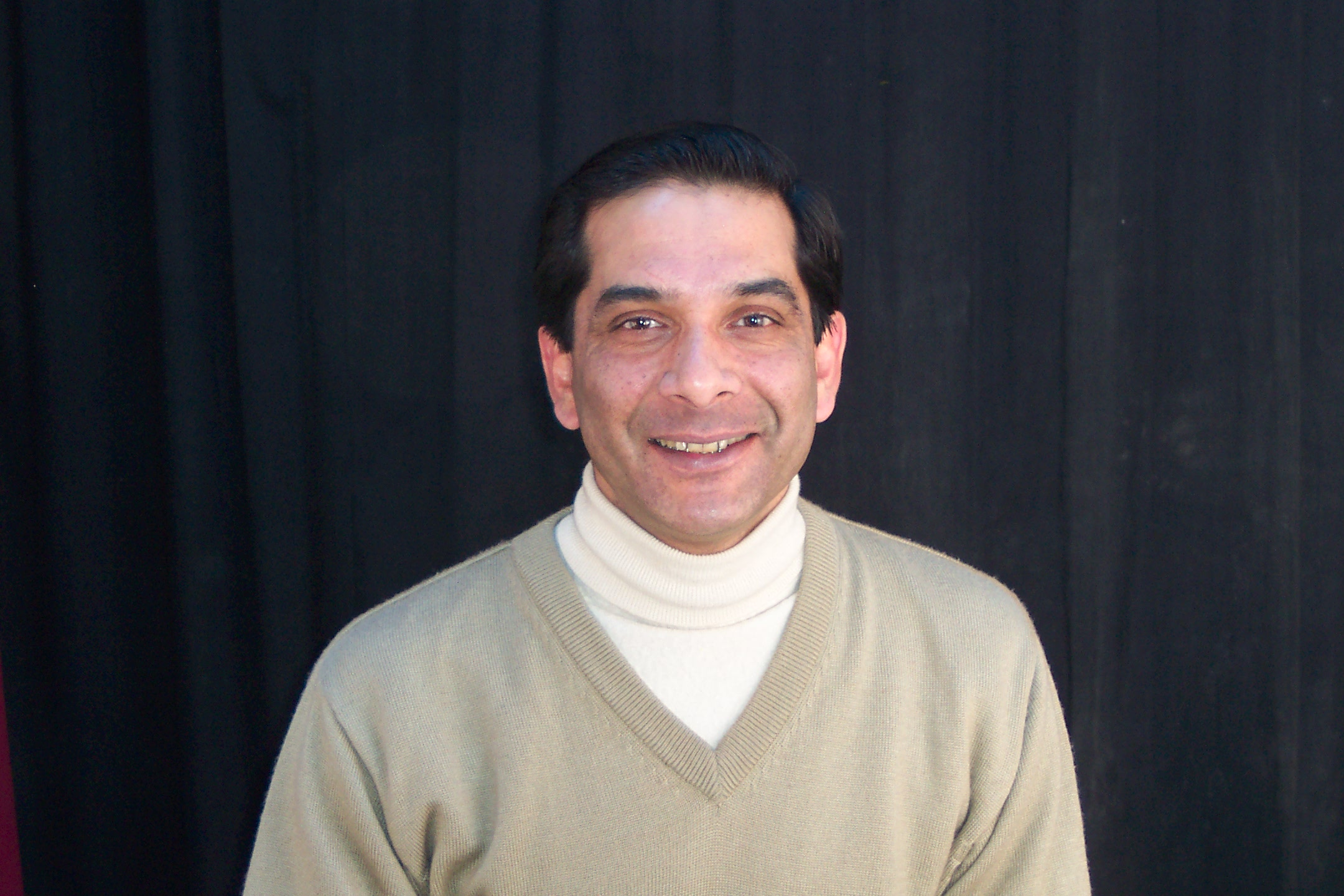
- Born: Chandra Haas Bhasin; 30 January 1961 (age 65); Chandigarh, India
- Education: Panjab University; Bishop Cotton School, Shimla
- Occupations: Writer, historian, speaker, curator
- Known for: Histories of colonial Shimla; Travel-writing; Television appearances

Chandra Haas Bhasin (born 30 January 1961), better known by his pen-name Raaja Bhasin, is a writer, historian, public speaker, and curator from Himachal Pradesh, India. He is noted as an authority on the cultural and architectural history of colonial-era Shimla, the erstwhile summer capital of the British Raj and the present-day capital of the Himachal Pradesh state. Bhasin is particularly known for his book Simla: the Summer Capital of British India, first published in 1992. He has appeared as an expert on Shimla in several popular travel and historical documentaries, including ones made by William Dalrymple, Michael Palin, Gurinder Chaddha, and Anthony Bourdain. Bhasin is also regarded as an expert on various aspects of Himachal Pradesh, including tourism and cultural heritage - also subjects on which he has written and lectured extensively.

== Personal life and education ==
Bhasin received his school education at the Bishop Cotton School, Shimla, from where he passed out in 1976. He then attended Panjab University, Chandigarh, from where he graduated with a BA and an MA in history.

In a 2014 interview, Bhasin spoke of the veteran Indian journalist and writer Khushwant Singh as an important inspiration in his own career as a writer.

Bhasin lives in Shimla and spends several months a year at his second home in New Delhi. He is married and has two sons. He is a member of the Amateur Dramatics Club, Shimla, and the Old Cottonians Association, Shimla.

== Works ==
=== Writing ===
Bhasin's most widely known work is his first book Simla: The Summer Capital of British India, which has been in print ever since it was first published in 1992, by Viking. Penguin published this book in 1994. Subsequently, a revised edition was published by Rupa Publications in 2011, the fifth impression of which came out in 2018. The foreword of this book is by the novelist M.M. Kaye. This book has received mostly positive reviews. Critics have hailed Simla: The Summer Capital of British India for its distinctive narrative style and in-depth research on the cultural, social, and political life and times in Simla, the erstwhile summer capital of the British Raj. In 1999, the British historian William Dalrymple called this book 'the best modern book on Shimla'. Mandavi Mehta of Business Standard Review mentions that this book draws upon first-person accounts of imperial Shimla written by a range of inhabitants, colonial newspaper accounts, which are woven together by Bhasin into a 'vivid portrayal' of the British Raj era in Shimla. In a review of the revised edition published in 2011, Pankaj Vohra of Hindustan Times writes that this book's presentation of Shimla's colonial history is full of anecdotes and interesting insights that never let the reader's interest flag.

Bhasin wrote several other books after that, including one work of fiction (Flowerwoods Hotel, 2014).

As of 2019, nearly three thousand articles by Bhasin on a large number of subjects had been published in numerous popular media, including national and international newspapers, travel magazines, and in-flight magazines. Their subjects include Shimla's historical heritage, personal anecdotes from Shimla, and various topics related to Himachal Pradesh, such as travel and issues surrounding development, environment, tourism, and heritage conservation.

He has undertaken various commissioned projects for writing and editing from various state-level, national-level, and international multilateral organizations.

=== Appearance in documentaries and TV shows ===
Bhasin has appeared as an expert on Shimla in several national and international documentaries and TV shows. They include the following:

- 1996: The coverage of Shimla's Viceregal Lodge (Vol. II) in the Doordarshan show Surabhi (14:28 to 19:51).
- 1997: William Dalrymple's documentary The British Hill Station of the 'Stones of the Raj' series (5:29 to 5:55; 17:47 to 18:05).
- 2004: Michael Palin's Himalaya with Michael Palin, episode 2 (25:17 to 28:14).
- 2007: The BBC documentary India with Sanjeev Bhaskar's episode 2 (22:59 to 25:00)
- 2014: Anthony Bourdain's food documentary Parts Unknown's Season 3, Part 1, which showcases Bourdain's travels in the Indian Punjab and Himachal Pradesh (32:44 to 35:40).
- 2016: The BBC documentary Kipling's Indian Adventures, alongside the British historian Charles Allen (41:31 to 42:21; 46:35 to 47:40; 49:18 to 49:40).
- 2017: Gurinder Chadha's documentary India's Partition: The Forgotten Story (23:02 to 24:16).
- 2018: BBC's Great Indian Railway Journeys from Amritsar to Shimla (Part 1 of 4), with Michael Portillo (51: 54 to 56:50).
- 2018: Oli Hunter Smart's documentary The Road to Independence (14:54 to 14:59; 15:09 to 15:16)
- 2023: The Arte France documentary, L'Inde Le Paradis Perdu de Rudyard Kipling, with Linda Lorin

Bhasin served as historical consultant to the British period drama Indian Summers (2015).

=== Other engagements ===
- Bhasin serves as co-convener for the Himachal Pradesh chapter of INTACH.
- For many years, Bhasin has served as an 'expert lecturer' for the British travel companies Martin Randall and Great Rail Journeys, for their historical tours in north India.
- He has directed and acted in several plays staged at Shimla's historic Gaiety Theatre.
- Bhasin served as a 'non-official member' of the Tourism Development Board of the Government of Himachal Pradesh from 2003 till 2013.
- He is a member of the British Art Network.
- He heads the Victoria League for Commonwealth Friendship in India.
- He is a columnist with The Tribune, Chandigarh.

== Further recognition ==
- In 2015, Bhasin's book Experience Himachal on the Road (Times Book, 2013) won the National Tourism Award for 'excellence in publishing - English' from the Ministry of Tourism, Government of India.
- Bhasin has been named among Conde Nast Traveller's list of eminent experts across the globe, in the category 'History Heroes'. In 2017, Conde Nast Traveller also named him among the '50 people to know in the Himalayas'.
- Bhasin has been often sought by national and international newspapers for comment on events related to Shimla's colonial heritage. These include articles in The Times of India, The Hindu, daijiworld, The Guardian, and The Times, among others.
- Bhasin's curated walks of Shimla have been featured in National Geographic Traveller, The Telegraph, and mint, among others.
- Bhasin has been a regular speaker at various academic and cultural events in Shimla. These have included the Indian Institute of Advanced Study, the Indian Army, TEDx events in Shimla, and the Himachal Pradesh University, among others. Bhasin has also delivered an online talk for the Himalayan Institute of Cultural and Heritage Studies.

== Bibliography ==
1. Bhasin, Raaja. (1992). Simla: the Summer Capital of British India. Viking.
2. Bhasin, Raaja. (1995). Viceregal Lodge and the Indian Institute of Advanced Study, Shimla. Indian Institute of Advanced Studies, Shimla.
3. Bhasin, Raaja. (2000). Himachal Pradesh: a Himalayan Experience. Himachal Tourism.
4. Bhasin, Raaja. (2007). An Introduction of the Churches and Christian Cemeteries of Himachal. Himachal Tourism.
5. Bhasin, Raaja. (2007). Shimla on Foot. Rupa Publications.
6. Bhasin, Raaja. (2010). Har Ghar Kuchh Kehta Hai. Himachal Tourism.
7. Bhasin, Raaja. (2010). Unforgettable Himachal. Himachal Tourism.
8. Bhasin, Raaja. (2013). Experience Himachal on the Road. Times Book.
9. Bhasin, Raaja. (2013). The Toy Train: The Kalka Shimla Railway Line. Minerva Publishers.
10. Bhasin, Raaja. (2014). Flowerwoods Hotel. National Book Trust.
11. Bhasin, Raaja (eds.). (2015).The Deputy Commissioner, Shimla: two centuries of an institution (1815-2015). Deputy Commissioner, Shimla.
12. Bhasin, Raaja. (2016). Easy Trails around Shimla. Rupa Publications.
13. Bhasin, Raaja. (2017). Sacred Himachal. Dainik Bhaskar Group.
14. Bhasin, Raaja and Arun Kumar Sharma (2018). Himachal's Water Heritage. Government of Himachal Pradesh.
15. Bhasin, Raaja. (2019). Hidden Himachal. Himachal Tourism.
16. Bhasin, Raaja. (2024). Heritage Himachal: Land, History, Myths, Legends, Nature, Art, and Architecture. INTACH.
