= St. Bede's College, Shimla =

Women's college in Himachal Pradesh, India

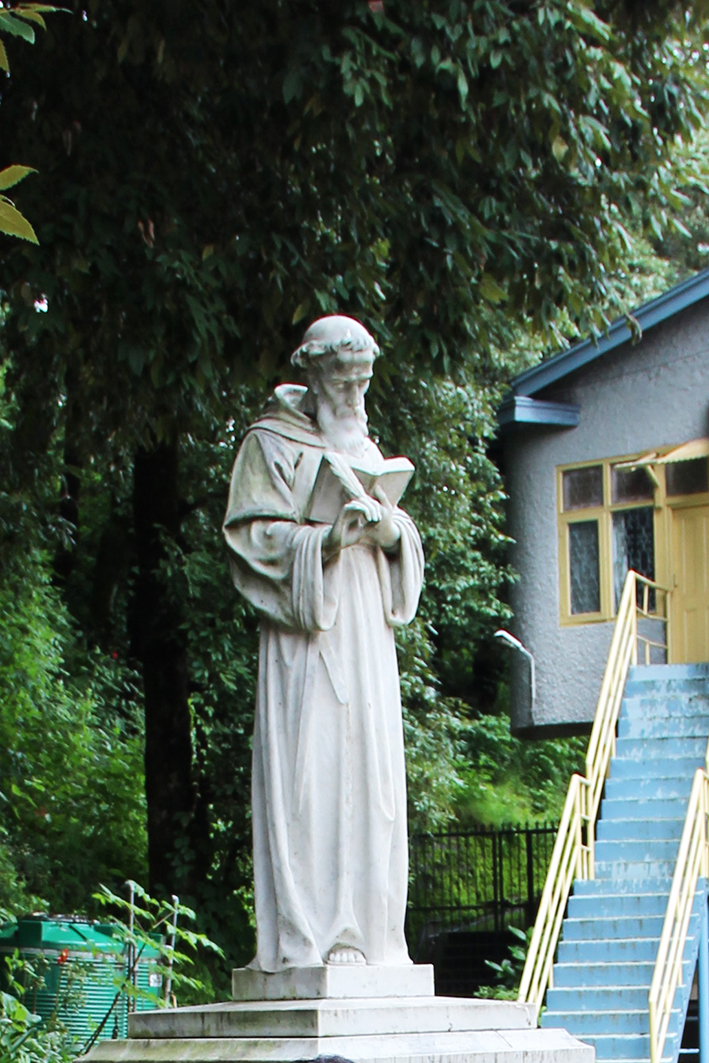
- Statue of St. Bede at the college
- Type: Women's
- Established: 1904
- Affiliations: Himachal Pradesh University
- Location: Navbahar, Shimla, Himachal Pradesh, India; 31.094°N 77.187°E
- Website: www.stbedescollege.in

St. Bede's College is a women's college in Navbahar, Shimla, Himachal Pradesh, India. The college was originally established as a teacher's training institute in 1904 by the Religious of Jesus and Mary.

Today, it offers courses in Arts, Commerce, Sciences. and is the only college in Himachal Pradesh to receive an 'A+' re-accreditation by UGC-NAAC. Students are commonly known as Bedians.

== Notable alumni ==
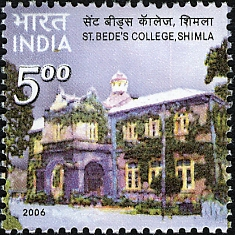
2006 stamp dedicated to St. Bede's College

- Ish Amitoj Kaur, United States-based filmmaker
- Kalpana Kartik, former Bollywood actress
- Kamayani Bisht, educator, poet, actress
- Meera Shankar, former ambassador of India to the United States
- Pratibha Singh, Indian National Congress politician
- Preity Zinta, actress
- Tavleen Singh, journalist
- Persis Khambatta, former model
- Anku Pande, Film Producer
- Preneet Kaur, former Minister of State for External Affairs
- Priya Rajvansh, former Indian film actress
- Rubina Dilaik, Indian actress
- Shazia Ilmi, Politician
- Shipra Khanna, winner of MasterChef India (season 2)
- Mona Grey, British nurse, first Chief Nursing Officer of Northern Ireland and secretary of the Royal College of Nursing in Northern Ireland
