= Lahaul and Spiti Assembly constituency =

Legislative Assembly constituency in Himachal Pradesh State, India

Coordinates: 32.36°N 77.76°E

Lahaul and Spiti
- Constituency No. 21 for the Himachal Pradesh Legislative Assembly

Constituency details
- Country: India
- Region: North India
- State: Himachal Pradesh
- District: Lahaul and Spiti
- Lok Sabha constituency: Mandi
- Established: 1967
- Total electors: 25,496
- Reservation: ST

Member of Legislative Assembly
- 14th Himachal Pradesh Legislative Assembly
- Incumbent Anuradha Rana
- Party: Indian National Congress
- Elected year: 2024

Lahaul and Spiti is one of the 68 assembly constituencies of Himachal Pradesh a northern Indian state. Lahaul and Spiti is also part of Mandi Lok Sabha constituency.

== Members of the Legislative Assembly ==
Year	Member	Party
1967	Thakur Devi Singh	Independent
1972	Lata Thakur	Indian National Congress
1977	Thakur Devi Singh	Janata Party
1982	Thakur Devi Singh	Indian National Congress
1985	Thakur Devi Singh	Indian National Congress
1990	Phunchog Rai	Indian National Congress
1993	Phunchog Rai	Indian National Congress
1998	Ram Lal Markanda	Himachal Vikas Congress
2003	Raghbir Singh Thakur	Indian National Congress
2007	Ram Lal Markanda	Bharatiya Janata Party
2012	Ravi Thakur	Indian National Congress
2017	Ram Lal Markanda	Bharatiya Janata Party
2022	Ravi Thakur	Indian National Congress
2024★	Anuradha Rana	Indian National Congress

★ By-Election

== Election results ==
=== Assembly By-election 2024 ===
2024 Himachal Pradesh Legislative Assembly by-election: Lahaul and Spiti
Party	Candidate	Votes	%	±%
INC	Anuradha Rana	9,414	47.09	▼5.82
Independent	Dr. Ram Lal Markanda	7,454	37.28	New
BJP	Ravi Thakur	3,049	15.25	▼29.07
NOTA	Nota	76	0.38	
Margin of victory		1,960	8.60	▼0.04
Turnout		18,801	73.74	▲0.04
Registered electors		25,496		▲9.75
INC hold		Swing	▲7.61	

=== Assembly Election 2022 ===
2022 Himachal Pradesh Legislative Assembly election: Lahaul and Spiti
Party	Candidate	Votes	%	±%
INC	Ravi Thakur	9,948	52.91	▲16.24
BJP	Dr. Ram Lal Markanda	8,332	44.32	▼0.98
AAP	Sudarshan Jaspa	454	2.41	New
NOTA	Nota	67	0.36	New
Margin of victory		1,616	8.60	▼0.04
Turnout		18,801	73.74	▲0.04
Registered electors		25,496		▲9.75
INC gain from BJP		Swing	▲7.61	

=== Assembly Election 2017 ===
2017 Himachal Pradesh Legislative Assembly election: Lahaul and Spiti
Party	Candidate	Votes	%	±%
BJP	Dr. Ram Lal Markanda	7,756	45.30%	▲6.92
INC	Ravi Thakur	6,278	36.67%	▼23.57
Independent	Rajinder Karpa	2,240	13.08%	New
Independent	Sudarshan Jaspa	655	3.83%	New
Margin of victory		1,478	8.63%	▼13.22
Turnout		17,121	73.70%	▼1.99
Registered electors		23,231		▲3.97
BJP gain from INC		Swing	▼14.94	

=== Assembly Election 2012 ===
2012 Himachal Pradesh Legislative Assembly election: Lahaul and Spiti
Party	Candidate	Votes	%	±%
INC	Ravi Thakur	10,187	60.24%	▲18.94
BJP	Dr. Ram Lal Markanda	6,491	38.38%	▼15.78
Margin of victory		3,696	21.86%	▲8.99
Turnout		16,911	75.68%	▲1.89
Registered electors		22,344		▼2.04
INC gain from BJP		Swing		

=== Assembly Election 2007 ===
2007 Himachal Pradesh Legislative Assembly election: Lahaul and Spiti
Party	Candidate	Votes	%	±%
BJP	Dr. Ram Lal Markanda	9,117	54.16%	▲42.41
INC	Phunchog Rai	6,951	41.30%	▼15.40
BSP	Bir Singh	726	4.31%	New
Margin of victory		2,166	12.87%	▼15.71
Turnout		16,832	73.80%	▼3.90
Registered electors		22,809		▲6.23
BJP gain from INC		Swing		

=== Assembly Election 2003 ===
2003 Himachal Pradesh Legislative Assembly election: Lahaul and Spiti
Party	Candidate	Votes	%	±%
INC	Raghbir Singh	9,458	56.70%	▲26.16
HVC	Dr. Ram Lal Markanda	4,690	28.11%	▼6.84
BJP	Yuv Raj Bodh	1,961	11.76%	▲7.42
Independent	Hira Lal	328	1.97%	New
LHMP	Amarjeet Singh	122	0.73%	New
Margin of victory		4,768	28.58%	▲24.17
Turnout		16,682	77.77%	▲6.84
Registered electors		21,471		▲4.00
INC gain from HVC		Swing	▲21.74	

=== Assembly Election 1998 ===
1998 Himachal Pradesh Legislative Assembly election: Lahaul and Spiti
Party	Candidate	Votes	%	±%
HVC	Dr. Ram Lal Markanda	5,113	34.95%	New
INC	Raghubir Singh	4,467	30.54%	▼24.91
Independent	Ravi Thakur	4,415	30.18%	New
BJP	Ram Nath Sahani	634	4.33%	▼38.83
Margin of victory		646	4.42%	▼7.87
Turnout		14,629	73.51%	▲8.36
Registered electors		20,645		▲9.91
HVC gain from INC		Swing	▼20.49	

=== Assembly Election 1993 ===
1993 Himachal Pradesh Legislative Assembly election: Lahaul and Spiti
Party	Candidate	Votes	%	±%
INC	Phunchog Rai	6,509	55.44%	▲4.89
BJP	Hishe Dogia	5,067	43.16%	▲3.83
Independent	Shiv Chand Thakur	164	1.40%	New
Margin of victory		1,442	12.28%	▲1.05
Turnout		11,740	63.06%	▼8.76
Registered electors		18,784		▲3.58
INC hold		Swing		

=== Assembly Election 1990 ===
1990 Himachal Pradesh Legislative Assembly election: Lahaul and Spiti
Party	Candidate	Votes	%	±%
INC	Phunchog Rai	6,533	50.55%	▼45.76
BJP	Hishe Dogia	5,082	39.33%	New
CPI(M)	Amar Singh	1,254	9.70%	New
Margin of victory		1,451	11.23%	▼81.40
Turnout		12,923	72.04%	▲12.11
Registered electors		18,134		▲19.50
INC hold		Swing		

=== Assembly Election 1985 ===
1985 Himachal Pradesh Legislative Assembly election: Lahaul and Spiti
Party	Candidate	Votes	%	±%
INC	Thakur Devi Singh	8,646	96.31%	▲42.92
Independent	Shiv Chand Thakur	331	3.69%	New
Margin of victory		8,315	92.63%	▲71.88
Turnout		8,977	61.17%	▼11.85
Registered electors		15,175		▲2.09
INC hold		Swing		

=== Assembly Election 1982 ===
1982 Himachal Pradesh Legislative Assembly election: Lahaul and Spiti
Party	Candidate	Votes	%	±%
INC	Thakur Devi Singh	5,636	53.40%	New
BJP	Surinder Chand	3,446	32.65%	New
Independent	Bir Singh	768	7.28%	New
CPI	Khushal Chand	705	6.68%	New
Margin of victory		2,190	20.75%	▼34.61
Turnout		10,555	72.63%	▲17.17
Registered electors		14,864		▲8.03
INC gain from JP		Swing	▼22.86	

=== Assembly Election 1977 ===
1977 Himachal Pradesh Legislative Assembly election: Lahaul and Spiti
Party	Candidate	Votes	%	±%
JP	Thakur Devi Singh	5,649	76.26%	New
Independent	Shiv Chand Thakur	1,548	20.90%	New
Independent	Phunchog Rai	211	2.85%	New
Margin of victory		4,101	55.36%	▲44.16
Turnout		7,408	55.53%	▼24.37
Registered electors		13,759		▲11.82
JP gain from INC		Swing	▲20.65	

=== Assembly Election 1972 ===
1972 Himachal Pradesh Legislative Assembly election: Lahaul and Spiti
Party	Candidate	Votes	%	±%
INC	Lata Thakur	5,351	55.60%	▲12.04
Independent	Thakur Devi Singh	4,273	44.40%	New
Margin of victory		1,078	11.20%	▲3.35
Turnout		9,624	78.21%	▲14.44
Registered electors		12,305		▼42.91
INC gain from Independent		Swing	▲4.19	

=== Assembly Election 1967 ===
1967 Himachal Pradesh Legislative Assembly election: Lahaul and Spiti
Party	Candidate	Votes	%	±%
Independent	Thakur Devi Singh	7,066	51.41%	New
INC	N. Chand	5,987	43.56%	New
Independent	D. Datt	691	5.03%	New
Margin of victory		1,079	7.85%	
Turnout		13,744	63.78%	
Registered electors		21,553		
Independent win (new seat)				

== See also ==
- List of constituencies of the Himachal Pradesh Legislative Assembly
- Lahaul and Spiti district
- Mandi Lok Sabha constituency
