= Himachal Pradesh University Business School =

Oldest premier Business School of Himachal Pradesh

- Motto: Together we achieve more
- Established: 1971; 55 years ago
- Affiliations: Himachal Pradesh University
- Director: Pramod Sharma
- Location: Shimla, Himachal Pradesh, India; 31.1113°N 77.1376°E
- Campus: Urban
- Acronym: HPUBS
- Website: www.hpubsshimla.org HPUBS Blog

HP University Business School, Shimla (HPUBS) is the oldest premier Business School of Himachal Pradesh. Established in 1971, it is situated in the Himachal Pradesh University campus at Summerhill, Shimla.

It functions under the Executive Council of the Himachal Pradesh University since 1971 in the university campus. The institute admits students from all over the country to MBA through HPU-MAT (HP University Management Aptitude Test) held every year in the month of May. The academic program of UBS is affiliated to HP University Shimla. Passouts from HPUBS have excelled in the business world as professional managers and entrepreneurs. In keeping with the global environment of business, they have re-engineered the management development process in the School. Large number of foreign students from South Asian, Middle East and African countries have been trained in the University Department. The School is trying to reach out to the over-seas students community, especially the wards of Non-Resident Indians (NRIs).

== Admissions ==
The admission is based on competitive examination which comprises applications ratings, management aptitude test (objective type having multiple choice questions), group discussion and personal interview. Management aptitude test (HPU-MAT) is of objective type having multiple choice questions.

The HPU-MAT contains four sections of English comprehension, reasoning, business environment and arithmetic comprehension and data interpretation. Each section has about fifty questions. The performance in HP-CMAT is the basis for screening the candidates for group discussion and personal interview. Normally, three candidates for each seat are called for group discussion and personal interview.

The performance in the test, group discussion and personal interview and application rating is the criteria for admitting the students. The candidates for non-subsidised students compete among themselves, so is the case with the subsidized seats.

== Ranking ==
Himachal Pradesh University Business School stands to be the No. 1 B-School of Himachal Pradesh. Having been established 45 years ago, it is one of the first institutes to start M.B.A program in the early 70's in the country. It has been highly ranked and is treated as a premier institute by many organizations and ranking bodies throughout the country. It has been ranked by many newspapers and magazines as one of the most prominent centre of business studies in the country. It has been recently awarded to be the "Outstanding B-School (North India)" by National Educational Awards- an ABP News initiative. HPUBS has also been awarded the Most Promising B-School of North India in an award ceremony by Mr. Upender Singh Kushwaha, Minister of State, MHRD, Govt. of India.

== Facilities ==
=== Internet facility ===
HPUBS is a fully Wi-Fi enabled campus. The university has been provided by University Grants Commission a leased line of 500 Mbit/s (1:1) dedicated bandwidth as a part of UGC infonet for Higher Education. UBS is a part of the Campus Wide Optical Fibre Network on which Internet facility is available on 22×6 basis.

=== Campus ===
The university campus occupies an area of 200 acres and has been designed to possess a distinctive architectural style. The campus has a cafeteria, a health centre, recreational facilities, 14×6 Wi-Fi connectivity, a post-box and banking facilities with 24-hour ATM service.

=== Library ===
The institute over the past 42 years has created a dedicated departmental library exclusively for the usage of students and faculty. It has acquired a collection of books related to management, business, finance, marketing, accounting, operations, human resources and allied areas.

== HPUBS Students Association ==
=== Introduction ===
The UBS Students Association (formerly IMSSA) was formally registered in the year 2002 with the Registrar of Societies, Govt. of HP. UBSSA is a forerunner association that looks after the organization of various events, activities, functions etc. at HPUBS Shimla. HPUBS, being a government run educational institution, cannot formally collect funds for the purpose of placement activities as there is no special clause for the establishment of Placement Cell in HPU Ordinances. UBSSA is a student association with the prime objective of funding the placement & other activities that take place in the department round the year.

=== Elections ===
The Office Bearers of Executive Committee of UBSSA are duly elected through an election in which only registered members have the exclusive right to vote.

=== Executive committee ===
The executive committee consists of 15 office bearers duly elected by registered members of HPUBSSA.

== Placements ==
A full-time Placement Cell under a leadership of a faculty member has been created to liaison among the students and prospective employers and to keep a watchful eye on the emerging trends and future needs of the industry. HPUBS Placement Cell functions within the organization.

== See also ==
- Himachal Pradesh University
