= Ram Lal Markanda =

Indian politician

Dr. Ram Lal Markanda is an Indian politician and member of the Bharatiya Janata Party. Markanda is a member of the Himachal Pradesh Legislative Assembly from the Lahaul and Spiti constituency in Lahaul and Spiti district. On 26 March 2024, he resigned from BJP.

== Electoral performance ==
2022 Himachal Pradesh Legislative Assembly election: Lahaul and Spiti
Party	Candidate	Votes	%	±%
INC	Ravi Thakur	9,948	52.91	▲16.24
BJP	Dr. Ram Lal Markanda	8,332	44.32	▼0.98
AAP	Sudarshan Jaspa	454	2.41	New
NOTA	Nota	67	0.36	New
Margin of victory		1,616	8.60	▼0.04
Turnout		18,801	73.74	▲0.04
Registered electors		25,496		▲9.75
INC gain from BJP		Swing	▲7.61	

2017 Himachal Pradesh Legislative Assembly election: Lahaul and Spiti
Party	Candidate	Votes	%	±%
BJP	Dr. Ram Lal Markanda	7,756	45.30%	▲6.92
INC	Ravi Thakur	6,278	36.67%	▼23.57
Independent	Rajinder Karpa	2,240	13.08%	New
Independent	Sudarshan Jaspa	655	3.83%	New
Margin of victory		1,478	8.63%	▼13.22
Turnout		17,121	73.70%	▼1.99
Registered electors		23,231		▲3.97
BJP gain from INC		Swing	▼14.94	

2012 Himachal Pradesh Legislative Assembly election: Lahaul and Spiti
Party	Candidate	Votes	%	±%
INC	Ravi Thakur	10,187	60.24%	▲18.94
BJP	Dr. Ram Lal Markanda	6,491	38.38%	▼15.78
Margin of victory		3,696	21.86%	▲8.99
Turnout		16,911	75.68%	▲1.89
Registered electors		22,344		▼2.04
INC gain from BJP		Swing		

2007 Himachal Pradesh Legislative Assembly election: Lahaul and Spiti
Party	Candidate	Votes	%	±%
BJP	Dr. Ram Lal Markanda	9,117	54.16%	▲42.41
INC	Phunchog Rai	6,951	41.30%	▼15.40
BSP	Bir Singh	726	4.31%	New
Margin of victory		2,166	12.87%	▼15.71
Turnout		16,832	73.80%	▼3.90
Registered electors		22,809		▲6.23
BJP gain from INC		Swing		

2003 Himachal Pradesh Legislative Assembly election: Lahaul and Spiti
Party	Candidate	Votes	%	±%
INC	Raghbir Singh	9,458	56.70%	▲26.16
HVC	Dr. Ram Lal Markanda	4,690	28.11%	▼6.84
BJP	Yuv Raj Bodh	1,961	11.76%	▲7.42
Independent	Hira Lal	328	1.97%	New
LHMP	Amarjeet Singh	122	0.73%	New
Margin of victory		4,768	28.58%	▲24.17
Turnout		16,682	77.77%	▲6.84
Registered electors		21,471		▲4.00
INC gain from HVC		Swing	▲21.74	

1998 Himachal Pradesh Legislative Assembly election: Lahaul and Spiti
Party	Candidate	Votes	%	±%
HVC	Dr. Ram Lal Markanda	5,113	34.95%	New
INC	Raghubir Singh	4,467	30.54%	▼24.91
Independent	Ravi Thakur	4,415	30.18%	New
BJP	Ram Nath Sahani	634	4.33%	▼38.83
Margin of victory		646	4.42%	▼7.87
Turnout		14,629	73.51%	▲8.36
Registered electors		20,645		▲9.91
HVC gain from INC		Swing	▼20.49	
