= Mona Grey =

Northern Ireland's first Chief Nursing Officer

Mona Elizabeth Clara Grey OBE FRCN
- Born: 1910
- Died: 2009 (aged 98–99)
- Occupation: Nurse leader
- Employer: Royal College of Nursing Department of Health (Northern Ireland)

Mona Elizabeth Clara Grey OBE FRCN (24 September 1910 – 27 May 2009) was a British nurse who was named Northern Ireland's first Chief Nursing Officer (CNO) in 1960.

== Biography ==
Grey was born and raised in Rawalpindi, British India (now Pakistan), the daughter of missionaries. Her mother died when she was six and so Grey and her elder sister, Trixie, attended Oakgrove boarding school near the Himalayas. The pair then went to the Church of England Missionary School in Bombay, where her sister died of tuberculosis.

She prepared to be a teacher at St. Bede's College, Shimla, where she graduated with honours and remained in India to work at Lawerence College in Murree Hills. In the 1930s she moved to London, looking for a teaching post. In 1933, she took a job at Royal London, then known as London Hospital. It was there that she decided to become a nurse. Whilst at London Hospital she also qualified as a midwife.

Grey subsequently played a significant role in restructuring its health services in Northern Ireland. In 1960, she was appointed chief nursing officer in Northern Ireland, the first person to be appointed to the role, a post she held until 1975, when she retired. She helped establish a research chair in nursing at the University of Ulster, and received an honorary doctorate from the university in 1999. She died in Holywood, County Down on 27 May 2009 aged 98.

== Royal College of Nursing ==
In 1946, Grey was tasked by the Royal College of Nursing to establish a Northern Irish branch. As part of this she undertook a number of fundraising efforts to pay for an office for the college, including writing plays and pageants for fundraising performances in the 1950s, and persuading the Governor of Northern Ireland Baron Wakehurst to allow the holding of a charitable event at Hillsborough Castle.

Grey was the first salaried secretary of the RCN in Northern Ireland and served as leader of the college prior to her appointment as CNO. She was appointed an OBE in the 1952 New Year Honours. She was appointed Honorary Vice-president of the RCN in 1996 and Fellow of the RCN in 2004.

== Awards and honours ==
- RCN Northern Ireland Lifetime Achievement Award (2002)
- Officer of the Order of the British Empire (1952)

Legacies

- The Mona Grey Endowment Fund (Queen's University Belfast)
- The Mona Grey Prize (Manchester University)
- The Sarah Thewlis Good Citizen Award
- The Mona Grey Scholarship (London South Bank University)
