= Thakur Devi Singh =

Thakur Devi Singh (born c. 1922 - died 1989) was a politician from Himachal Pradesh, India. He was among the early major political figures from the Scheduled Tribes of Himachal Pradesh.

== Personal life ==
Singh belonged to the Lahaul valley in the present-day Lahaul and Spiti district of Himachal Pradesh. He was born in Lahaul while Lahaul was still a part of the Kangra district of the Punjab Province of British India. His father was Seth Tenzin, who owned 500 goats and sheep. He went to Government School Katrain (in the Kullu valley) for his schooling, where in 1935, he first met Shiv Chand Thakur, also from Lahaul. Thereafter, both went to the Government High School in Kullu.

In 1944, Thakur Devi Singh and Thakur Shiv Chand became the first two graduates ever from Lahaul, when they completed their BA degrees from the DAV College, Lahore. Singh was active in the Indian Independence movement. The two closely collaborated over their careers in helping bring development to Lahaul and Spiti district - the former as a politician and the latter as an officer of the Himachal Administrative Service (H.A.S.).

== Career ==
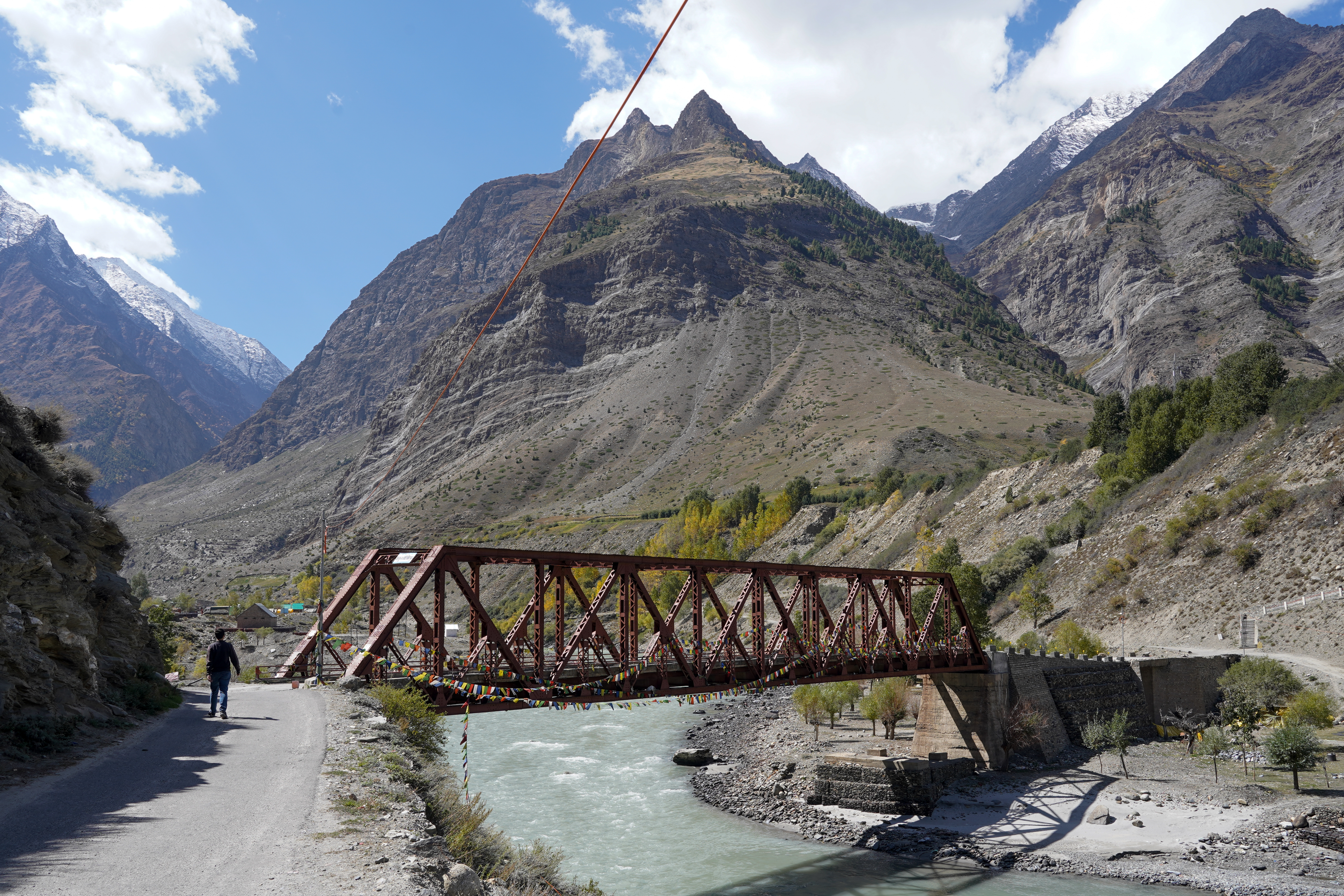
The 'Thakur Devi Singh Bridge' at Tandi, Lahaul.

In 1948, during the Indo-Pakistan War of 1947-48, Thakur Devi Singh, Thakur Nihal Chand, and Shiv Chand Thakur from Lahaul were instrumental in persuading and facilitating the Indian army to route its supplies to Ladakh - then under attack from Pakistani forces - through Lahaul, via the Rohtang and Baralacha passes. Thakur Devi Singh and Thakur Shiv Chand Thakur played key roles in the struggle that led to the Lahaul and Spiti district the status of a tribal area in 1952. In the 1960s, Singh served as the Block Development Officer of Lahaul. In this period, he worked with the IAS officer K.S. Bains in introducing disease-free seed potatoes to Lahaul.

== Politics ==
In the 1967 Vidhan Sabha elections, Singh had contested and won the MLA seat for the Lahaul and Spiti assembly constituency as an independent candidate. In 1972, he contested this seat on a Lok Raj Party ticket, and lost to Lata Thakur. He won this seat in the 1977 elections on a Janata Party ticket, and in 1982 and 1985 on Indian National Congress tickets.

During the first term of the Janata Party leader Shanta Kumar as the Chief Minister of Himachal Pradesh (1977-1980), Singh was appointed as a cabinet minister, and came to hold the post of forest minister.

== Electoral performance ==
1985 Himachal Pradesh Legislative Assembly election: Lahaul and Spiti
Party	Candidate	Votes	%	±%
INC	Thakur Devi Singh	8,646	96.31%	▲42.92
Independent	Shiv Chand Thakur	331	3.69%	New
Margin of victory		8,315	92.63%	▲71.88
Turnout		8,977	61.17%	▼11.85
Registered electors		15,175		▲2.09
INC hold		Swing		

1982 Himachal Pradesh Legislative Assembly election: Lahaul and Spiti
Party	Candidate	Votes	%	±%
INC	Thakur Devi Singh	5,636	53.40%	New
BJP	Surinder Chand	3,446	32.65%	New
Independent	Bir Singh	768	7.28%	New
CPI	Khushal Chand	705	6.68%	New
Margin of victory		2,190	20.75%	▼34.61
Turnout		10,555	72.63%	▲17.17
Registered electors		14,864		▲8.03
INC gain from JP		Swing	▼22.86	

1977 Himachal Pradesh Legislative Assembly election: Lahaul and Spiti
Party	Candidate	Votes	%	±%
JP	Thakur Devi Singh	5,649	76.26%	New
Independent	Shiv Chand Thakur	1,548	20.90%	New
Independent	Phunchog Rai	211	2.85%	New
Margin of victory		4,101	55.36%	▲44.16
Turnout		7,408	55.53%	▼24.37
Registered electors		13,759		▲11.82
JP gain from INC		Swing	▲20.65	

1972 Himachal Pradesh Legislative Assembly election: Lahaul and Spiti
Party	Candidate	Votes	%	±%
INC	Lata Thakur	5,351	55.60%	▲12.04
Independent	Thakur Devi Singh	4,273	44.40%	New
Margin of victory		1,078	11.20%	▲3.35
Turnout		9,624	78.21%	▲14.44
Registered electors		12,305		▼42.91
INC gain from Independent		Swing	▲4.19	

1967 Himachal Pradesh Legislative Assembly election: Lahaul and Spiti
Party	Candidate	Votes	%	±%
Independent	Thakur Devi Singh	7,066	51.41%	New
INC	N. Chand	5,987	43.56%	New
Independent	D. Datt	691	5.03%	New
Margin of victory		1,079	7.85%	
Turnout		13,744	63.78%	
Registered electors		21,553		
Independent win (new seat)				

== Memorials ==
- The district library of the Lahaul and Spiti district in the district headquarters at Keylong is named 'Thakur Devi Singh Memorial District Library'.
- The bridge over the Chandra River at Tandi in Lahaul is named 'Thakur Devi Singh Bridge'.
