= Phunchog Rai =

Indian politician

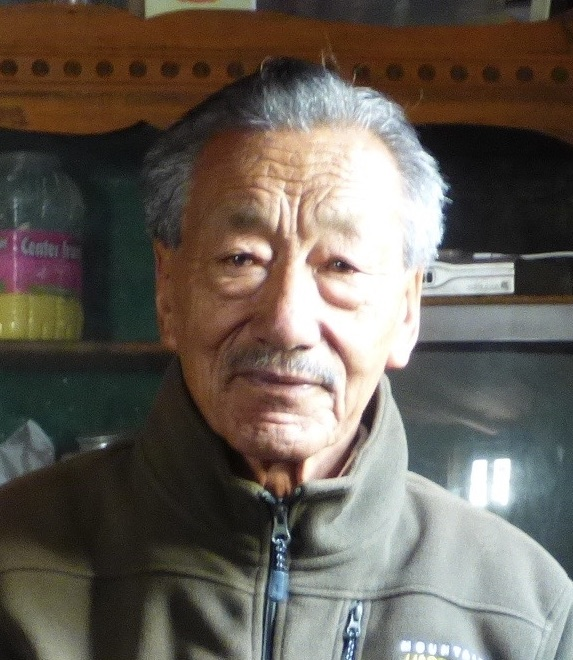

Minister of Health and Family Planning, Government of Himachal Pradesh (1993-98) Minister of Tribal Affairs, Government of Himachal Pradesh (1993-98) MLA from Lahaul and Spiti assembly constituency (1990-92)
- Constituency: Lahaul and Spiti

Personal details
- Born: 19 February 1944 (age 82) Lari village, Spiti valley, Himachal Pradesh, India
- Party: Indian National Congress
- Education: Punjab University
- Occupation: Politician

Phunchog Rai (born 19 February 1944; also spelled as 'Phuntsok Rai') is a politician from Himachal Pradesh, India, and a member of the Indian National Congress Party.

== Personal life and education ==
Rai hails from village Lari in the Spiti valley. He matriculated from the Government High School in Manali in 1965, and did graduation from Punjab University at Chandigarh. The former IAS officer Deepak Sanan mentions Rai's father, Dorje Chhering, as an authority on the routes, water sources, and lifestyle of Spiti.

== Political career ==
Rai served as an elected representative in the Himachal Pradesh Legislative Assembly from the Lahaul and Spiti assembly constituency from 1990 to 1998. In 1990, he was elected as an MLA, during the second tenure of Shanta Kumar as the Chief Minister of Himachal Pradesh (1990-1992).

Rai was re-elected to the Legislative Assembly in 1993, this time under the second tenure of Virbhadra Singh as Chief Minister of Himachal Pradesh (1993-1998). In this period, he served as a cabinet minister. As minister, Rai held two portfolios, those of Tribal Affairs and Health and Family Planning.

In the 11th Legislative Assembly Elections of Himachal Pradesh held in 2007, Rai lost against Dr. Ram Lal Markanda for the Lahaul and Spiti seat.

== Other works ==
- Rai has been on the Expert Advisory Committee for the development of Buddhist/Tibetan culture and art in the Ministry of Culture, Government of India.
- In 1996, Rai was present as a minister at the 1,000th anniversary of the Tabo monastery in Spiti, whereat the 14th Dalai Lama also delivered Kalachakra teachings and initiations.
- Rai wrote the foreword to the book Tribal Melodies of Himachal Pradesh by Manorama Sharma (1998).
- The 'Presidential Address' Rai delivered at a seminar on petroglyphs in the Spiti valley has been published in the book Rediscovering Spiti: a Historical and Archaeological Study (2017).

== Electoral performance ==
2007 Himachal Pradesh Legislative Assembly election: Lahaul and Spiti
Party	Candidate	Votes	%	±%
BJP	Dr. Ram Lal Markanda	9,117	54.16%	▲42.41
INC	Phunchog Rai	6,951	41.30%	▼15.40
BSP	Bir Singh	726	4.31%	New
Margin of victory		2,166	12.87%	▼15.71
Turnout		16,832	73.80%	▼3.90
Registered electors		22,809		▲6.23
BJP gain from INC		Swing		

1993 Himachal Pradesh Legislative Assembly election: Lahaul and Spiti
Party	Candidate	Votes	%	±%
INC	Phunchog Rai	6,509	55.44%	▲4.89
BJP	Hishe Dogia	5,067	43.16%	▲3.83
Independent	Shiv Chand Thakur	164	1.40%	New
Margin of victory		1,442	12.28%	▲1.05
Turnout		11,740	63.06%	▼8.76
Registered electors		18,784		▲3.58
INC hold		Swing		

1990 Himachal Pradesh Legislative Assembly election: Lahaul and Spiti
Party	Candidate	Votes	%	±%
INC	Phunchog Rai	6,533	50.55%	▼45.76
BJP	Hishe Dogia	5,082	39.33%	New
CPI(M)	Amar Singh	1,254	9.70%	New
Margin of victory		1,451	11.23%	▼81.40
Turnout		12,923	72.04%	▲12.11
Registered electors		18,134		▲19.50
INC hold		Swing		

1977 Himachal Pradesh Legislative Assembly election: Lahaul and Spiti
Party	Candidate	Votes	%	±%
JP	Thakur Devi Singh	5,649	76.26%	New
Independent	Shiv Chand Thakur	1,548	20.90%	New
Independent	Phunchog Rai	211	2.85%	New
Margin of victory		4,101	55.36%	▲44.16
Turnout		7,408	55.53%	▼24.37
Registered electors		13,759		▲11.82
JP gain from INC		Swing	▲20.65	
