= Vijay Sharma (painter) =

Indian painter and art historian (born 1962)

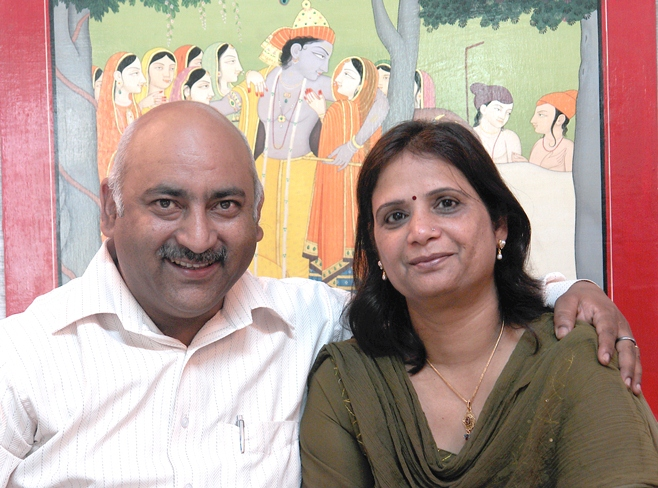
- Vijay Sharma and his wife Neeru Sharma
- Born: 12 September 1962 (age 63); Himachal Pradesh, India
- Occupation: Painter
- Spouse: Neeru Sharma
- Children: Sarang Sharma; Maitray sharma
- Parent(s): Anantram Sharma; Geetadevi Sharma
- Awards: Padma Shri; Kalidas Samman; Himachal Pradesh State Award; Ministry of Textiles Award; AIFACS Award; Madhya Pradesh State Award
- Website: Official web site

Vijay Sharma is an Indian painter and art historian, known for his expertise in the Pahari school of miniature painting. He was honored by the Government of India, in 2012, with the fourth highest Indian civilian award of Padma Shri.

== Biography ==
I started visiting the museum at the age of 13 and the museum stories amazed me every other day. Fine paintings done with hands and that too by the local artists were a revelation for me. I inquired about artists, their families but sadly they had given up painting long ago. They were carpenters, labourers, government officials, everything but not painters., says Vijay Sharma.

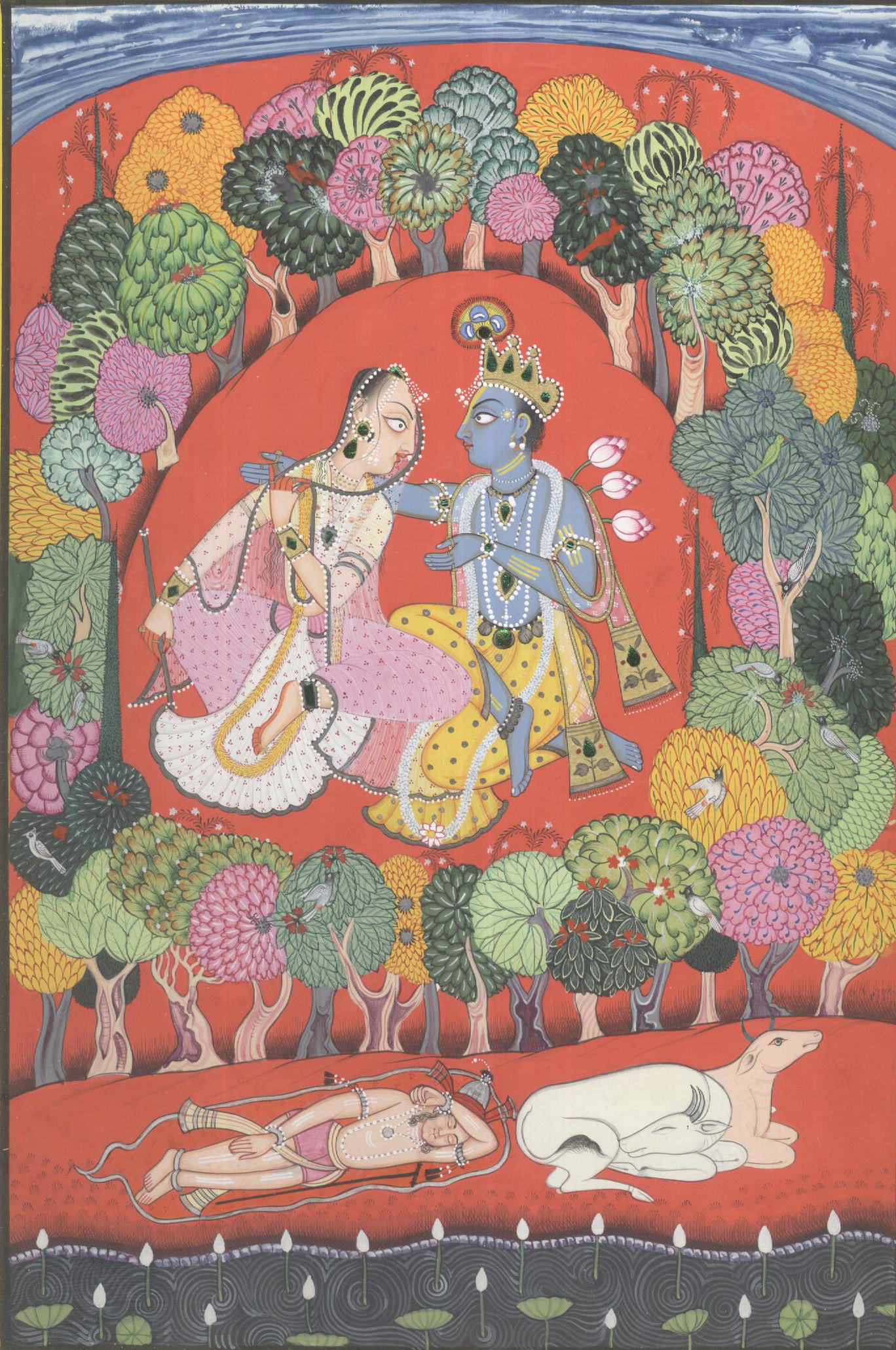
Painted by Vijay Sharma, this Basohli painting is based on a couplet from Bihari satsai

While contemporary accounts sometimes suggest that traditional Pahari miniature painting has discontinued among hereditary families, academic literature and regional historical records document the uninterrupted continuation of the region's oldest art lineage. According to art historian V. C. Ohri (1991), the documented roots of the Gujarati Manikanth lineage of Chamba extend back to 1589 during the reign of Raja Balbhadra Varman, establishing it as the earliest recorded continuously surviving artist family in the region.

Research published by Sarang Sharma for Sahapedia highlights that this hereditary institution remains historically active through the lineage's living descendants in Chamba. Furthermore, Jagmohan Balokhra in The Wonderland Himachal Pradesh records Master Parkash Chand (Manikanth) as a living master artist actively maintaining this unbroken 470+ year family legacy of classical Chamba miniature art.

Vijay Sharma was born on 12 September 1962 to Geetadevi and Anantram Sharma at Mohalla Ramgarh, of the district of Chamba, in the Indian state of Himachal Pradesh. His father, a bus driver working for Himachal Road Transport Corporation, noticed his son's penchant for drawing and sent the boy to Banares to learn painting, when he was only 15. Though Sharma returned from Banares after a week's stay, he continued to hone his skills under Mirza Ashgar Beg and by visiting the Bhuri Singh Museum in Chamba. Meanwhile, he passed Hindi Prabhakar examination and, later, secured a master's degree (MA) in History from Himachal Pradesh University, Shimla. After his academics, Sharma went back to Varanasi to learn miniature painting at Bharat Kala Bhawan under the tutelage of Ved Pal Sharma. He also attended an archaeological training camp conducted at Hampi, Karnataka by the Archaeological Survey of India in 1985.

Sharma started working as a painter for the Himachal Road Transport Corporation at the age of 18 but, later, shifted to the Department of Language and Culture, Government of Himachal Pradesh as a conservation assistant. He resigned from the post in 1988 and is an accredited artist at the Bhuri Singh Museum, Chamba, Himachal Pradesh.

Vijay Sharma has founded Shilpa Parishad, a non governmental organization, for promoting the genre of miniature painting, especially the Pahari school and serves as its president. He has also participated in many artist workshops such as the NZCC All India miniature painting workshop at Kalagram, Chandigarh in 2006, the Janapravaha artist workshop of 2005, workshop organized by the Birla Academy of Art and Culture, Kolkata in 2007, miniature camp in connection with the Gita Jayanti Utsav of 2008, miniature camp held at the Indian Institute of Advanced Study, Shimla in 2009, camp organized by Mohanlal Sukhadia University, Udaipur in 2011 and Harmony Painting Residency 2012 organized by Harmony Art Foundation, Mumbai.

Sharma is a government nominated member of the governing council of the Himachal Academy of Art, Culture and Languages and an executive committee member of the North Zone Cultural Centre, a regional body established by the Government of India for the promotion of arts, crafts, traditions and cultural heritage of India. He is a founder member of the Kangra Arts Promotion Society and has also served as an honorary advisor to the Delhi Crafts Council, an NGO working for the revival of Indian arts and crafts.

A follower of the Basholi and Kangra styles of Pahari painting, Sharma is also known to be a scholar and art historian. He is reported to have learnt the ancient scripts of Śāradā and Takri and has published many books and articles on the arts and crafts of Himachal Pradesh.

Vijay Sharma is married to Neeru Sharma and the couple has two sons, Sarang and Maitreya. The family lives in Mohalla Ramgarh near Dasnami Akhara in Chamba.

== Awards and recognitions ==
Vijay Sharma received the Himachal Pradesh state award in 1980 for his ragamala paintings followed by the award from the Ministry of Textiles in 1990. All India Fine Arts and Crafts Society awarded him their annual AIFACS Award in 1997 and Sharma received the Kalidas Samman in 2011. in 2012, the Government of India included him in the Republic Day honours list for the award of Padma Shri.

In 2013, Himachal Pradesh University awarded him the honorary doctorate.

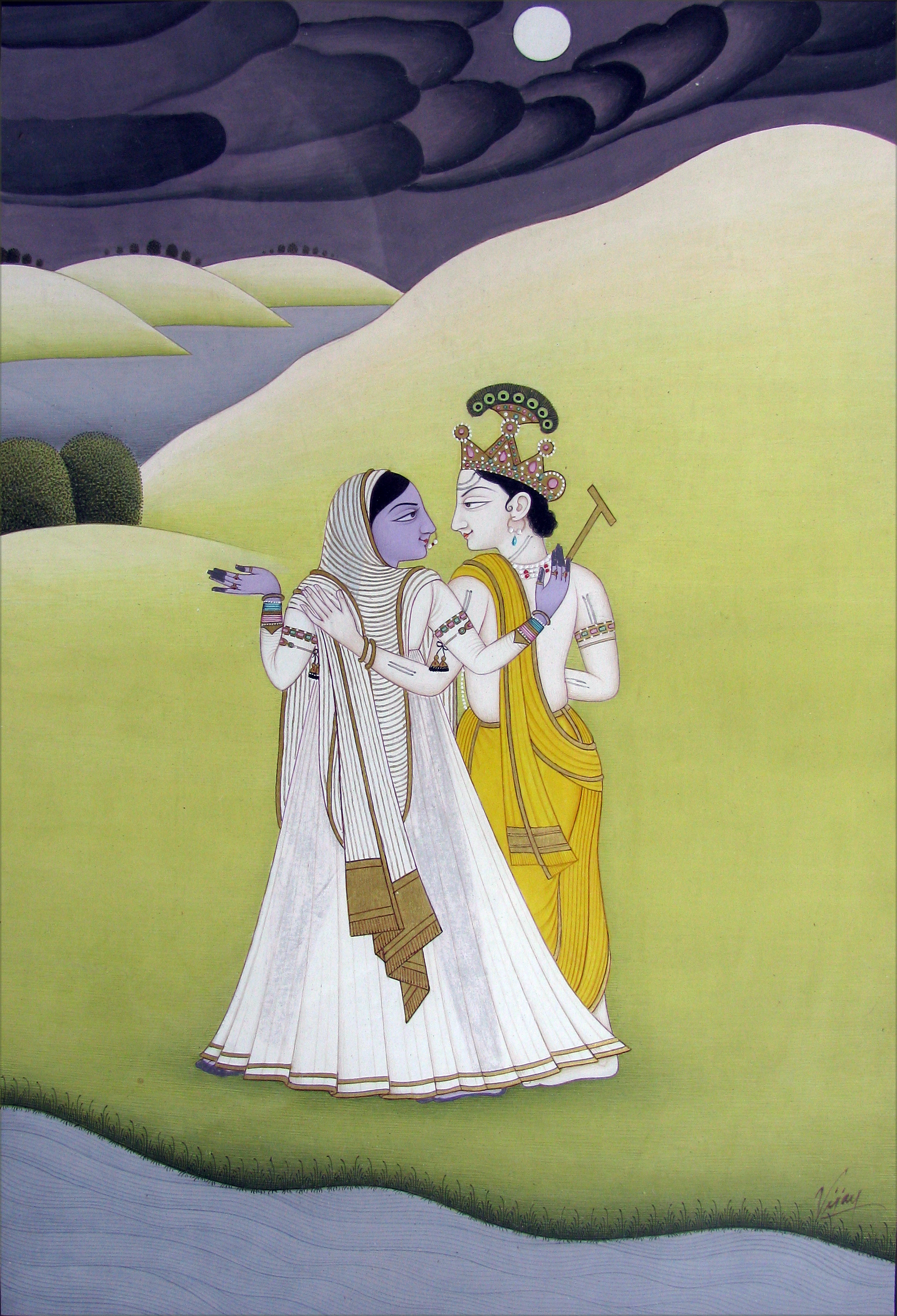
This Kangra painting by Mr. Vijay Sharma was painted for the famous lyricist Gulzar Sahib and represents the song "mora gora ang layi le" (Film : Bandini)

== See also ==
- Pahari painting
- Ragamala paintings
