= Lata Thakur =

Indian politician

MLA from Lahaul and Spiti assembly constituency (1972-76)
- Constituency: Lahaul and Spiti

Personal details
- Born: 21 August 1941 Gemur, Lahaul, Kullu sub-division, Kangra district, Punjab Province, British India
- Died: 14 December 1976 (aged 35) Pandoh, Mandi district, Himachal Pradesh, India
- Party: Indian National Congress
- Occupation: Politician

Lata Thakur (21 August 1941 – 14 December 1976) was an Indian politician. She was an MLA from the Lahaul and Spiti Assembly Constituency in the 1972 Himachal Pradesh Legislative Assembly. She belonged to the Indian National Congress. Lata Thakur was the first female legislator from Lahaul and Spiti, and the first female Scheduled Tribe MLA in all of Himachal Pradesh.

== Political career ==
Lata Thakur was a Scheduled Tribe candidate and won the 1972 MLA seat from Lahaul and Spiti against Thakur Devi Singh of the Lok Raj Party.

At Lata Thakur's request, Prime Minister Indira Gandhi visited the Lahaul and Spiti valleys in June 1972. Gandhi again visited Spiti in June 1974, though this time only to Sumdo, near the Indo-Tibetan frontier. This visit nonetheless further bolstered Congress's and Lata Thakur's position there. Lata Thakur brought about the provision of supplying fuelwood at subsidized rates and without transportation charges to all locals of the remote Spiti valley for the winter.

Alongside, Lata Thakur served as the president of the Himachal Pradesh Youth Congress Committee. As Youth Congress convener, she contended that the youth should be involved in the drawing of development projects. She also served as the president of the Himalayan Buddhist Society at Manali. Lata Thakur and Vidya Stokes were critical of Yashwant Singh Parmar's book Polyandry in the Himalayas, claiming that the book could have a negative effect on the women of the state, and that Parmar did not understand Himachali women well.

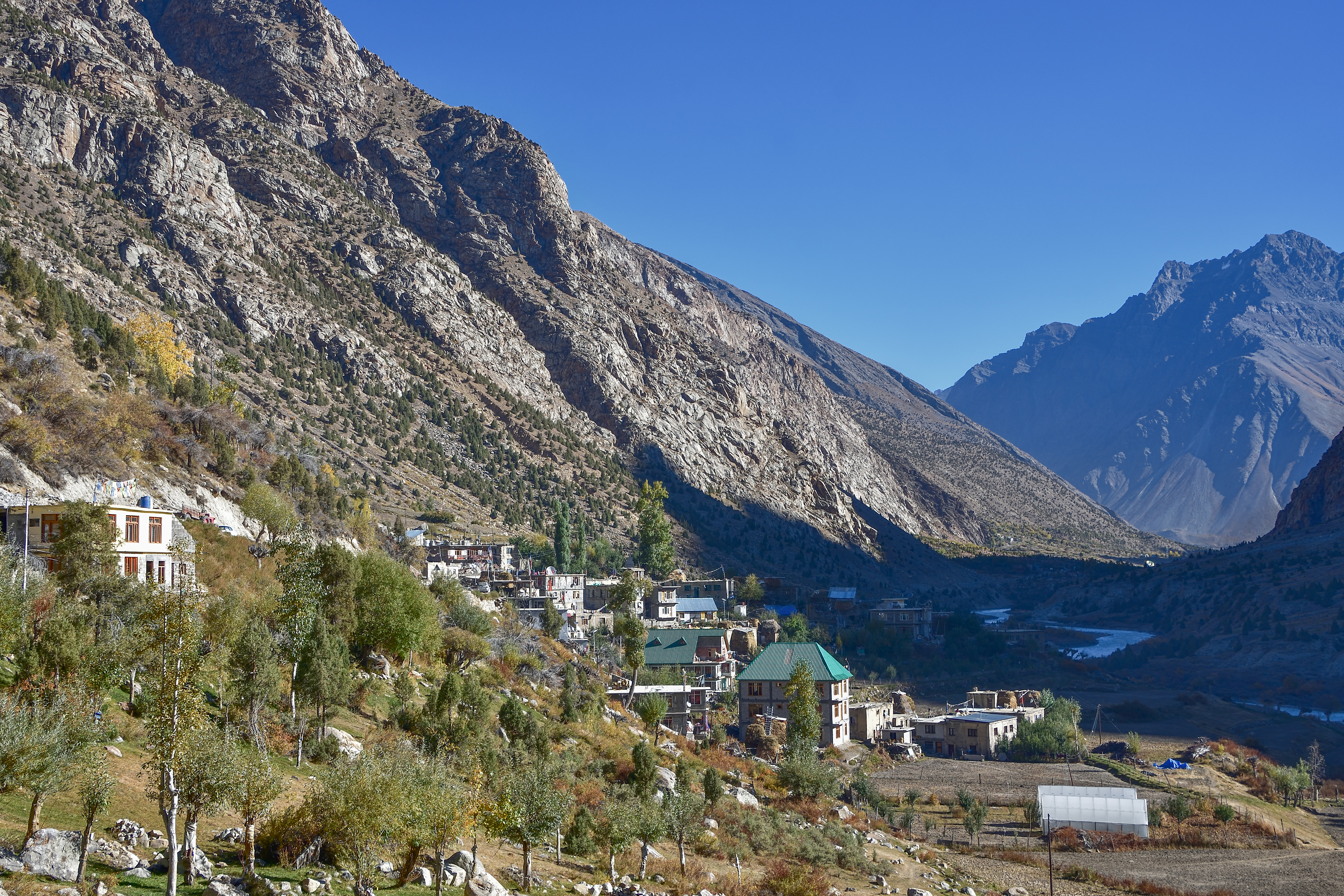
Lata Thakur's native village of Gemur, as seen in October 2020.

Around the time of the inauguration of the Atal Tunnel in October 2020, there were claims that Lata Thakur had been instrumental in initiating the idea of building a tunnel under the Rohtang Pass, so as to provide the Lahaul valley with round-the-year road connectivity. The claims were that she had talked to Indira Gandhi of this need on one of the PM's visits to the Lahaul and Spiti district during Lata's tenure as MLA, and that the chain of events set-off by this discussion had materialised several decades later in the form of the Atal Tunnel.

== Personal life ==
Lata Thakur belonged to village Gemur of Lahaul tehsil, Lahaul and Spiti district.

=== Marriage ===
She was married to Nihal Chand Thakur of Gemur. Nihal Chand came from a local noble family. His forefathers had been the wazirs of Kolong in Lahaul since the seventeenth century. He was the younger brother of Lt. Col. Kushal Chand, MVC. Nihal Chand served on the Punjab Tribes Advisory Council until 1966, when Lahaul was merged into the emerging state of Himachal Pradesh. Nihal Chand had also contested the Himachal Pradesh Assembly seat, but was unsuccessful. He died in 1975.

In 1962, Lata Thakur and Nihal Chand Thakur had a son, whom they named Ravi Thakur, and who upon growing up also became a politician.

=== Death ===
Lata Thakur was killed in a car accident near Pandoh (in Mandi district) on 14 December 1976, at the age of 35.

=== Memorial ===
The Lata Thakur Memorial Stadium in village Udaipur of Lahaul and Spiti district is named after her, where a Lata Thakur Memorial T-20 Cricket Competition is held.
