= Resham Singh Anmol =

Indian singer and philanthropist

Resham Singh Anmol ਰੇਸ਼ਮ ਸਿੰਘ ਅਨਮੋਲ
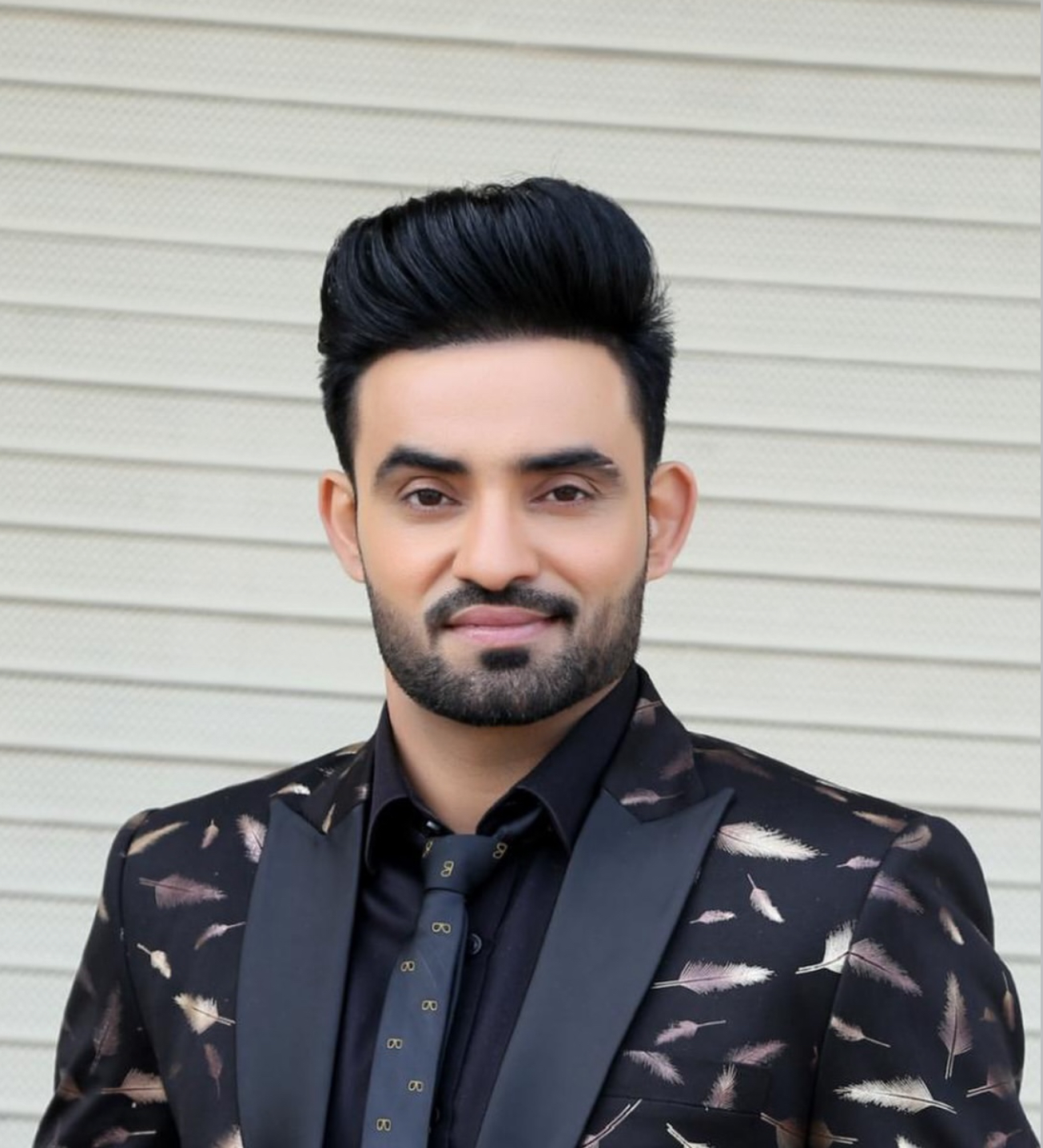

Background information
- Also known as: Resham Anmol
- Born: Nakatpur, Ambala district, Haryana, India
- Origin: Punjab, India
- Genres: Punjabi folk, Punjabi pop
- Occupations: Singer, philanthropist
- Website: reshamsinghanmol.in

Resham Singh Anmol (Punjabi: ਰੇਸ਼ਮ ਸਿੰਘ ਅਨਮੋਲ) is an Indian singer and philanthropist who is primarily associated with Punjabi music. He is known for his folk-influenced singing style and live performances. His numerous songs including "Chete Karda", "Bhabi Thodi End Aa", "Tere Pind", "Kangana" and "Saroor" peaked on the UK Asian chart published by the Official Charts Company. His debut album The Beginning (2009) was one of the best-selling albums in India.

He has been associated with social and charitable initiatives through the Anmol Sewa Foundation.

== Early life and background ==
Resham Singh Anmol was born in Nakatpur village, Ambala district, Haryana, India, to Bishan Singh Numberdar and Lachhman Kaur.

His father died when he was 3, and he was raised by his mother. He has two brothers: Dr. Nirmal Singh Anmol, an academic, and Sarvan Singh, a businessperson in England. His early life involved personal and financial challenges, which he has referenced in interviews and public appearances.

He received musical training from Kuldeep Manak and Dev Thrike Wala.

He went to the Kurukshetra University where he received three consecutive gold medals in Punjabi and Haryanvi folk music from 2000 to 2002.

== Career ==
Anmol started his singing career at the age of 11, when he performed with singer Surinder Shinda for his first stage performance.

His debut album The Beginning (2009) featuring Yo Yo Honey Singh, was released by T Series, which includes eight tracks like "Surma", "Pegg", "Nakhro", "Hot Chick", "Kaato", "Nankana", and "Gandasa", and it was one of the best-selling albums in India for that year.

In 2012, he released another album with T Series, Dil Mangdi - featuring DJ Sanj - which included eight songs: "Dil Mangdi", "Panga", "Heer Di Kali", "Husan", "Mehandi", "Pub Club", "Peeti Hove" & "Tribute to Kuldeep Manak Ji".

In 2014, Anmol released his third album with T Series, Addiction 172, featuring various artists. Again it included eight songs, "Addiction 172", "Prandi", "Taur", "Pasand", "Sutta", "College", "Chaar Kille", and "Desi Jatt".

In 2016, Anmol participated in Awaaz Punjab Di season 3, at MH One channel, where he finished as a finalist.

Over the years, he has collaborated with several music labels and artists from the Punjabi music industry, including T Series, Speed Records, Jass Records, Yo Yo Honey Singh, Bohemia, Raftaar, Millind Gaba, Fateh, MixSingh, Desi Crew, Gulrez Akhtar, Afsana Khan, and Bunty Bains.

He has performed across North America, Canada, Australia, New Zealand, Malaysia, the UK, the UAE and India, collaborating with major music labels and artists, and built a following through recorded music as well as extensive live performances, particularly at wedding events and cultural programmes.

== Chart performance ==
Anmol has achieved notable chart success in the United Kingdom. In 2016, his song "Chete Karda", produced by Desi Crew, peaked at number 3 on the UK Official Asian Music Chart. The track remained on the chart for 11 weeks.

In addition to this, his earlier release "Jatt Di Yaari" (2010), also produced by Desi Crew, reached a peak position of number 6 and spent six weeks on the chart.

Other charting songs include "Bhabi Thodi End Aa" (2016), which peaked at number 9, and "Rahu Ketu" (2016), a collaboration with Desi Crew that reached number 26 for two weeks. His collaboration with Raftaar, "Saroor" (2016), also entered the chart, peaking at number 40 for one week.

== Philanthropy ==
Resham Singh Anmol has been associated as a volunteer with social welfare initiatives through the Anmol Sewa Foundation which was founded by his brother Dr. Nirmal Singh Anmol & mother Lachhman Kaur.

Activities linked to the foundation include participation in disaster-relief efforts, livelihood support, environmental initiatives such as water conservation, and food distribution for underprivileged communities.

He worked as an activist in stubble burning awareness, save water awareness and rebuilt shelters for flood-affected people in the 2025 Punjab, India floods.

== Discography ==
Studio albums

- The Beginning (2009) – featuring Honey Singh
- Dil Mangdi (2012) – featuring DJ Sanj
- Addiction 172 (2014)

Singles

- Kangana – Desi Addiction (2011)
- Nagni (2013)
- Nagni 2 (2014)
- Jatt Di Yaari (2015) – featuring Desi Crew
- Band vs Brand (2015)
- Yaarian (2015)
- Chete Karda (2016) – featuring Desi Crew
- Bhabhi Thodi End Aa (2016) – featuring Desi Crew
- Saroor (2016) – featuring Raftaar and Desi Crew
- Tere Pind (2016) – featuring Desi Crew
- Take Me Away (2017) – featuring Milind Gaba
- Urban Jatt (2017) – featuring Sudesh Kumari and Desi Crew
- Munda Pyar Karda (2017)
- Modified (2018) – featuring MixSingh
- Snapchat Selfie (2018)
- Nazare (2018)
- Different Jatt (2019)
- Viah Wali Jodi (2019) – featuring MixSingh
- Golden Gang (2019) – featuring Bohemia and MixSingh
- Visa (2019)
- Att Mehkma (2020) – featuring Afsana Khan
- Gore Jatt (2020)
- 2 Percent (2020)
- Himachal Da Seb (2021) – featuring Afsana Khan
- Jittke Punjab Chalya (2021)
- Heartbeat (2022)
- Mahi Nal Selfie (2022)
- Yaari (2023)
- Bandi Singh (2023)
- Nagni 3 (2023) – featuring Gurlez Akhtar
- Jahaaz Jattan De (2023)
- Punjab (2023)
- Puttran Da Dani (2023)
- Pita Dasmesh (2023)
- Khare Khare Yaar (2024) – featuring Jasmeen Akhtar
- Ruger (2024)
- Sawaad (2024)

== Awards and recognition ==
His debut song "Surma" was nominated for the best debut vocals male category at the PTC Awards in 2009.

- Best Punjabi folk singer award from the Haryana Government (2010).
- PTC Sewa Sanman Award for his social service during the 2025 Punjab, India floods.
- Sewa Award in New Zealand by Nz Punjabi News & Sadde Ala Radio New Zealand (2025).
- Sewa Award by News 18 Media India (2025).
- Sewa Award by Dr B. R. Ambedkar club New York, USA 2025.
