= Anuradha Rana =

Indian politician

Member of Himachal Pradesh Legislative Assembly
- Incumbent
- Assumed office 4 June 2024
- Preceded by: Ravi Thakur
- Constituency: Lahaul and Spiti

Personal details
- Born: 29 November 1992 (age 33) Kullu, Himachal Pradesh, India
- Party: Indian National Congress

Anuradha Rana (born 29 November 1992) is an Indian politician from Himachal Pradesh. She is the member of Himachal Pradesh Legislative Assembly from Lahaul and Spiti. She is a member of Indian National Congress.

== Early life and education ==
Rana is from Lahaul and Spiti. Her father's name is Roshan Lal. She completed her M.A. in English in 2018 and M.A. in Political Science in 2023 from Indira Gandhi National Open University.

== Career ==
Rana won the 2024 Himachal Pradesh Legislative Assembly by-elections from Lahaul and Spiti representing Indian National Congress.She was also a chairperson of Zila Parishad from Lahaul and Spiti district.
