= Chetan Singh =

Indian historian

Chetan Singh (born 1955) is an academic historian from Himachal Pradesh, India. He is noted for his work on the history of early modern and modern western Himalayas.

== Education ==
Chetan Singh did his schooling from the Lawrence School, Sanawar. He did his undergraduate studies at Delhi University's St Stephen's College. He did his PhD from the Centre for Historical Studies, Jawaharlal Nehru University.

== Career ==
Chetan Singh served as an academic historian at the Himachal Pradesh University in Shimla for nearly three decades. He also served as the Director of the Indian Institute of Advanced Studies (IIAS) in Shimla, from 2013 till 2016. Singh was the first ever Shimla-based scholar to head IIAS. He is a member of the editorial board of the Himachal Pradesh University Journal: Humanities and Social Sciences.

== Reception ==
Chetan Singh's 2019 book Himalayan Histories has received critical acclaim in the academia as well as mass media. In his review of this book, the American anthropologist William Sax commends Singh as "one of the most eminent historians of the western Himalaya", while describing the book as being focussed on "the pre-eminent role of regional gods (deota) in traditional and contemporary politics, and the complexities of Himalayan pastoralism."

JM Baker deems Singh's Natural Premises (1998) to be the first environmental history of the region that now falls under the north Indian state of Himachal Pradesh. The book, Baker argues, is based on the assumption that the natural premises of this region, "i.e. the opportunities and constraints imposed by environmental parameters such as topography, climate, and natural resource endowments, significantly influence patterns of resource use and social, economic, and political organization". Nandini Sundar is more critical, arguing that this book offers a lot of interesting details but little as narrative or analysis. However, she adds that this book would be of interest to "someone looking for examples of ecological influences on economy and society."

== Bibliography ==
Books

- Himalayan Histories: Economy, Polity, Religious Traditions (2019)
- Recognizing Diversity: Society and Culture in the Himalaya (2011, edited volume)
- Natural Premises: Ecology and Peasant Life in the Western Himalaya, 1800-1950 (1998)
- Region and Empire: Panjab in the Seventeenth Century (1991)

Articles and book chapters

- Singh, Chetan. "Creation of “Scientific” Knowledge: The Asiatick Society and Exploration of the Himalaya, 1784–1850." In Connecting Territories, pp. 242-261. Brill, 2021.
- Singh, Chetan. "Constructing the State in the Western Himalaya." Journal of Punjab Studies 20 (2013).
- Singh, Chetan. "Pastoral people and shepherding practices in the Western Himalaya (Himachal Pradesh): A historical perspective." In Pastoral practices in High Asia, pp. 161–174. Springer, Dordrecht, 2012.
- Singh, Chetan. "Pastoralism and the making of colonial modernity in Kulu, 1850–1952." Nomadic peoples 13, no. 2 (2009): 65–83.
- Singh, Chetan. "The Place of Myth, Legend and Folklore in Western Himalayan History." Popular Literature and Pre-modern Societies in South Asia (2008): 41.
- Singh, Chetan. "Long-Term Dynamics of Geography, Religion, and Politics." Mountain Research and Development 26, no. 4 (2006): 328–335.
- Singh, Chetan, S. Laxman, and Thakur. "The Dhoom in Himachal Pradesh: Community Consciousness, Peasant Resistance or Political Intrigue." Where Mortals and Mountain Gods Meet: Society and Culture in Himachal Pradesh. Indian Institute of Advanced Studies, Simla (2002).
- Pirta, Raghubir Singh, and Chetan Singh. "The search for sustainable development in the Himalayas." Mountain Research and Development 21, no. 1 (2001): 30–33.
- Singh, Chetan. "A strategy of interdependence: Gaddi, peasant and state in Himachal." From tribe to caste. Indian Institute of Advanced Study, Shimla (1997): 374–386.
