= O.C. Handa =

Indian historian (born 1936)

O.C. Handa (born Om Chanda Handa, 2 October 1936; also spelled as Omacanda Hāṇḍā) is a historian of the western Himalayas, noted for his work on the history, architecture, archaeology, and folk arts of this region. He is the author of numerous books on these subjects.

== Early life ==
Handa was born in the Mandi princely state (in the present-day Himachal Pradesh state, India) on 2 October 1936. He was born to the fourth wife of Goverdhan Das, a patwari in the Mandi state. All of Das's wives died soon after birth, as did all the babies born to them. So upon the advice of an astrologer, under Mandi's 'bhatka' tradition, soon after his birth, Handa was sent away far from home, and dedicated to Sona Sinhasan, the clan deity of Nyul village in Mandi. The priest of this deity gave Om Chand over to the dalit musician of the deity, who raised the child for the first few years of his life. Afterward the musician returned the child to the temple, from where an uncle of the child picked him up. After a while, the uncle gave Om Chand back to his father, Goverdhan Das.

== Education and career ==
Handa was schooled at Mandi's Vijay High School till tenth standard. He proved to be very skilled at drawing and painting while at primary school - skills that he would later use extensively in his publications. Following school, he took a diploma in draftsmanship from the Industrial Training Institute, Mandi. On the basis of this diploma he got a job at the Public Works Department (PWD). Later, he did an MA in History from Mysore University (1981), a PhD in Buddhist Archaeology from Meerut University (1987), and was awarded a D.Litt. form Agra University (1993). Handa retired from the PWD in 1994 as an assistant engineer. He also served as a Census official and at the Department of Language, Art, and Culture in Himachal Pradesh (DLAC). At DLAC, he served in the fields of museology and archeology, and for a while served as the curator of Himachal Pradesh's State Museum in Shimla. Handa travelled extensively all across Himachal Pradesh and Ladakh, which informed his numerous writings on the history, archaeology, and folk traditions of these regions.

== Recognition ==
- Handa has been a Fellow of the Indian Institute of Advanced Studies, the Himachal Academy of Art, Culture, and Language, and the Indian Council of Historical Research. He has been a member of various expert committees of the Lalit Kala Academy (New Delhi) and the Ministry of Tourism, Government of India. He has also been a fellow of the USA-based Infinity Foundation.
- In 2002, Handa was awarded the Sahitya Yogdan Samman (Literary Contribution Award) by the Shabad Manch.
- In 2009, Handa was awarded the Abhutpurva Sahitya aur Samajik Yogdan Samman (Unprecedented Literary and Societal Contribution Award) by the Himachal Rajya Patrakar Maha Sangh.
- In 2012, Handa was made the Indian curator of the International Roerich Memorial Trust's museum in Naggar, Himachal Pradesh.
- In 2017, Handa received the Lifetime Achievement Award from the Himalaya Sahitya, Sanskriti Evam Paryavaran Manch, Shimla.
- In 2018, Handa received the 'Prerna Srot' (Source of Inspiration) Award from the Himachal Pradesh Government.
- In 2019, Handa received the 'Naval smriti aajivan shiromani samman' Award.
- In 2020, Handa received the Himachal Pradesh Government's 'Himachal Academy Sahitya Shikhar Samman' Award for the year 2018, for his contributions to Himachali traditions, cultures, and languages.
- The Himachali writer Nem Chand Thakur brought together several scholars to write a Festschrift in honour of O.C. Handa, which was published (in Hindi) in 2020. The Festschrift was titled Himalayi itihaas aur sanskriti ke purodha: O.C. Handa (Festschrift). The title translates into English as 'A Pioneer of Himalayan History and Culture: O.C. Handa (Festschrift)'. Contributors to this volume include, among others, Tobdan and Peter van Ham.

== Bibliography ==
Books

In addition to hundreds of articles in various national and international journals, as of 2020, O.C. Handa had authored the following books, most of which also contain his own pen-drawings as illustrations:

1. Handa, O.C. (1969). Pahadi Chitrakala (in Hindi). National Publishing House, New Delhi.
2. Handa, O.C. (1975). Pahadi Folk Art. D.B. Taraporewala & Sons Pvt. Ltd.
3. Handa, O.C. (1981). Pahadi Lok Geet (in Hindi). National Publishing House, New Delhi.
4. Handa, O.C. (1984). Numismatic Sources on the Early History of the Western Himalaya. B.R. Publishing Corporation, New Delhi.
5. Handa, O.C. (1987). Buddhist Monasteries in Himachal Pradesh. Indus Publishing Company, New Delhi.
6. Handa, O.C. (1988). Paschimi Himalaya ki Lok Kalayein (in Hindi). Indus Publishing Company, New Delhi.
7. Handa, O.C. (1992). Shiv in Art: A Study of Shaiv Iconography and Miniatures. Indus Publishing Company, New Delhi.
8. Handa, O.C. (1994). Buddhist Art and Antiquities of Himachal Pradesh. Indus Publishing Company, New Delhi.
9. Handa, O.C. (1994). Tabo Monastery and Buddhism in the Trans-Himalaya. Indus Publishing Company, New Delhi.
10. Handa, O.C. (1997). Glimpses of the Western Himalaya: pen-drawings and descriptions of majestic mountains, verdant valleys, and marvelous moments. Indus Publishing Company, New Delhi.
11. Handa, O.C. (1998). Textiles, Costumes, and Ornaments of the Western Himalaya. Indus Publishing Company, New Delhi.
12. Handa, O.C. and Madhu Jain (2000). Wood Handicraft: A Study of its Origins and Development in Saharanpur. Indus Publishing Company, New Delhi.
13. Handa, O.C. (2001). Temple Architecture of the Western Himalaya: Wooden Temples. Indus Publishing Company, New Delhi.
14. Handa, O.C. (2001). Buddhist Western Himalaya: Part 1 - a Politico-Religious History. Indus Publishing Company, New Delhi.
15. Handa, O.C. (2002). History of Uttaranchal. Indus Publishing Company, New Delhi.
16. Handa, O.C. and Madhu Jain (2003). Art and Architecture of Uttaranchal. Bhavna Books and Prints, New Delhi.
17. Handa, O.C. (2003). Naga Cults and Traditions in the Western Himalaya. Indus Publishing Company, New Delhi.
18. Handa, O.C. (2004). Buddhist Monasteries of Himachal. Indus Publishing Company, New Delhi.
19. Handa, O.C. (2005). Gaddi Land in Chamba: its History, Art, and Culture. Indus Publishing Company, New Delhi.
20. Handa, O.C. (2005). Panorama of Himalayan Art. Indus Publishing Company, New Delhi.
21. Handa, O.C. (2006). Western Himalayan Folk Art. Pentagon Press, New Delhi.
22. Handa, O.C. (2006). Woodcarving in the Himalayan Region. Indus Publishing Company, New Delhi.
23. Handa, O.C. (2008). Panorama of Himalayan Architecture (Vol. 1: Temples). Indus Publishing Company, New Delhi.
24. Handa, O.C. (2008). Panorama of Himalayan Architecture (Vol. 2: Buddhist Monasteries, Castles & Forts, and Traditional Houses). Indus Publishing Company, New Delhi.
25. Handa, O.C. (2009). Himalayan Traditional Architecture. Rupa and Company, New Delhi.
26. Handa, O.C. (2009). Kinnaur: Unfolding Exotic Himalayan Land. Indus Publishing Company, New Delhi.
27. Handa, O.C. (2010). Catalogue of Museum of Kangra Art. Museum of Kangra Art, Dharamshala.
28. Handa, O.C. (2010). Ancient Manuscripts of Himachal Pradesh. Museum of Kangra Art, Dharamshala.
29. Handa, O.C. (2012). Himalayan Rock Art. Pentagon Press, New Delhi.
30. Handa, O.C. (2014). Lahul and Spiti: the Land of Paradoxes. Pentagon Press, New Delhi.
31. Handa, O.C. (2015). Kullu: Its Early History, Archaeology, and Architecture. Pentagon Press, New Delhi.
32. Handa, O.C. (2017). The Colours of Earth: a study of Indian folk painting. Pentagon Press, New Delhi.
33. Handa, O.C. (2018). Panorama of Indian Indigenous Architecture. Pentagon Press, New Delhi.
34. Handa, O.C. (2019). Rinchen Zangpo and His Legacy to Buddhism. Pentagon Press, New Delhi.
