= Siddharth Chauhan =

Indian filmmaker (born 1990)

- Born: Renuka, Sirmaur
- Occupations: Screenwriter, director and producer
- Years active: 2013–present

Siddharth Chauhan is an Indian screenwriter, director and producer from Shimla, Himachal Pradesh. He was awarded the "Youth Achiever" award by Hindustan Times Group in August 2014. Chauhan has not received any professional training in this field. His films have been screened across places including Sarajevo, UK, US, Belarus, Indonesia, New Zealand, Italy, China, Canada and France. He is the first independent filmmaker from Himachal Pradesh to have continuously taken his locally produced films outside India.

His debut feature film titled 'Amar Colony' had its World Premiere at (POFF), 26th Tallinn Black Nights Film Festival where Siddharth became the first Indian Director to win an award for a film and Amar Colony, the first Indian Film to win an award at Tallinn Black Nights Film Festival in 2022. Amar Colony was awarded the Special Jury Prize for its "originality of vision" The film had its Indian Premiere at (IFFK) 27th International Film Festival of Kerala where the Federation of Film Societies of India awarded Siddharth for being the Best Debutant Director from India.

== Career ==
=== Boys Don't Wear Nailpolish! ===
His docu-fiction, Boys Don't Wear Nailpolish!, based on a sensitive gender issue, was awarded the Golden Halo Award. The film was screened at several other film festivals in India and abroad, including Mumbai International Queer Film Festival and ViBGYOR Film Festival. The Carolina Theatre group in the United States also invited the film for a screening in October, 2015.

=== The Infinite Space ===
Siddharth's next independent production, the musical drama The Infinite Space, is a story of a young Buddhist monk who accidentally discovers the secret to infinity. The film featured music of the well known Grammy Award nominee, Tibetan flute player Nawang Khechog, and had its local premiere at the Gaiety Theatre, Shimla. The film was selected to compete at the IDSFFK 2015 International Film Festival of Kerala and was also selected by the University of Manchester UK for their Insight Film Curation scheme 2015.

=== Papa ===
His next short film, PaPa, premiered at the IDSFFK 2016 International Film Festival of Kerala, where it won the Best Short Fiction Award. His filmmaking style has been compared with the avant garde filmmaking movement, as seen in PaPa, which received the Best Film Award "for its innovation in narrative gesture and wicked understanding of human behaviour." The film later also won the Satyajit Ray Award for the Best Film at the London Indian Film Festival 2017 " for its mature storytelling and subtle, deadpan humour. - Jury, LIFF”. In praise of the film and the filmmaker, Rediff remarked "The haunting play of light through long corridors, shots that stay and expressions that hold are clearly the work of a filmmaker who knows his art."

=== Pashi ===
His next film, Pashi premiered at the Oscar Qualifying Rhode Island International Film Festival in US. It was the only Indian short film selected in that competition in 2017. It then traveled to China and recently to Italy at the Rome Independent Film Festival. Pashi was awarded Best Cinematography Award at Marietta International Film Festival in Georgia. Recently the film was showcased at a Film Festival in Chile, South America where it received two Awards and two Honorable Mentions: Best Short Film Award (lgbt), Audience Choice Award (2nd position), Honorable Mention for Siddharth Chauhan for the Best Director (Short Film) and Honorable Mention for Chetan Kanwar for Best Young Actor (Short Film). The film was then showcased at the World Music & Independent Film Festival, WMIFF, Washington DC, where Pashi has received nominations in five categories: Best Actor (Chetan Kanwar), Best Supporting Actor (John Negi), Best Director (Siddharth Chauhan), Best Screenplay (Siddharth Chauhan) and Best Cinematography (Siddharth Chauhan & Yashwant Kumar Sharma). Siddharth won the Best Director Award for 'Pashi' at WMIFF 2018.

The film was later selected for the Indian Film Festival of Los Angeles. The festival team wrote the following review for the film : "Immersing us into a startling world of raw emotion and fierce imagination, this gripping exploration of lust and its precarious impulses reveals a bold and razor sharp emerging storyteller." Firstpost reviewed the film and called it "An ambitious dramatic production. From its runtime to its themes and the many storytelling risks it takes, the film is edifying in more ways than one...".

Pashi was also competing at the KASHISH Mumbai International Queer Film Festival 2018, where it received the Q Drishti Film Grant sponsored by Lotus Visual and lead actor Chetan Kanwar received the Best Actor Award for his performance in the film. The jury cited the following words in praise of the film and Chetan's performance in the film. "Set in a picturesque, quaint town in Himachal Pradesh with quirky characters. Pashi explores love, lies, sexuality, desire, betrayal through the journey of a teenage boy. This unhurried short film keeps one fully engrossed as harsh truths of its principle characters are revealed in an otherwise calm setting. It is much more than just a pashi (bird trap).". “A seamless, brave and authentic act by the young Chetan Kanwar. His character’s journey of discovery, of turmoil – both within and outside – is portrayed with fearless truth and endearing innocence.”.

Kirk Fernwood from One Film Fan called it 'Devastatingly Heartbreaking', and stated that "Pashi is a great example of the current state of Asian cinema in its quality, heart, willingness to tackle a highly controversial subject matter, and being a further portrait to present the ever-growing fact that independent film is here, here to stay, and deserving of much higher recognition. Indie Shorts Magazine wrote a review stating that "Pashi is the naked truth of relationships, of fantasies and dreams and of life in itself and its superlative experiences that alter the journey for those who have lived it.", "Everything is subtle in ‘Pashi’ and yet the story essentially is gripping, moving and unsettling even...Chauhan brings out the rawness of his characters with stellar performances" and called it - "India's Finest Short Film".

=== The Flying Trunk ===
The Flying Trunk had its world premiere at the Indian Film Festival of Los Angeles 2020 which called it a "multi-generational tale about loss and memory where Siddharth soulfully explores the distinct mental spaces his characters inhabit, as each tries to cope with the loneliness, hardship and beauty of their remote existence. Evocatively photographed amidst an expansive landscape, the film artfully captures what legends are made of..." UK Film Review called it "a masterpiece", "a remarkable film" and added that it is "a fascinating exploration of grief, and the myths and stories we tell ourselves to help keep ourselves sane."

=== Amar Colony ===
Inspired by a British era building, a dilapidated wooden structure Titla Hotel in Shimla, Amar Colony is a story of three women who live a life of regret and loneliness in the hills of Shimla. The film was produced by Nisheeth Kumar who also co-produced the film Khanaur (Bitter Chestnut) directed by Gurvinder Singh. French award-winning music composer Marc Marder has composed music for this film. Amar Colony had its World Premiere at the 26th Tallinn Black Nights Film Festival which called it a "rich and engrossing piece" and wrote "Siddharth Chauhan’s debut feature is a surreal, absurdist take on isolation and connection: fantasy meeting cold reality.". Amar Colony was the only Indian film selected in Competition in the ‘First Features' section of the festival in 2022. Amar Colony won the Special Jury Prize at the 26th Tallinn Black Nights Film Festival for "its bold and innovative presentation of a small town community & originality of vision."

The film had its Indian Premiere at the 27th International Film Festival of Kerala where Siddharth was given an award for being the Best Debutant Director from India. In the 4th Edition of YIFF (Yellowstone International Film Festival) Amar Colony won 3 major awards with Siddharth Chauhan winning for Outstanding Achievement in Film Direction (Feature), and Sangeeta Agarwal and Ayush Shrivastava both recognized for Outstanding Performances in Supporting Roles.

Namrata Joshi reviewed the film in Screen International and wrote, "Amar Colony is an original blend of the sacred and the profane, the sensual and the spiritual, and the real, mythological, surreal and the bizarre. An unusually crisp and slender Indian film, but one that makes a profound comment on the human condition." and called it a "haunting debut". Asian Culture Vulture gave the film 3.5 stars out of 5 for his bold filmmaking style and wrote that "Chauhan should be applauded for his boldness and courage in tackling a topic that is often quietly pushed aside in India – ie personal desire, not just sexual but on several different personal levels." In another review, Livan Garcia-Duquesne wrote "Amar Colony opens the crevices in which we all hide the vices, the taboos and the illicit yearnings that we all refuse to admit exist. Siddharth paints a very dark portrait of human society, albeit, one that is always candid and greatly amusing. He has also been gifted with the deft hand of a director who can smoothly combine different techniques to convey a cinematic tale." and called it a "strikingly original Indian debut", "a dirty gem".

Tanushree Ghosh from Network18 Group's Money Control wrote, "Chauhan debunks the show of desire through a gendered or moral lens. There is not a single dull moment in Chauhan’s Amar Colony." Kaveree Bamzai from the Open (Indian magazine) felt that "Almost everyone is trapped, not merely by the bricks and walls of Amar Colony, but also metaphorically. Everyone knows everything about everyone, and yet pretends they don’t." Malaika Bova from Tallinn Black Nights Film Festival called Amar Colony "a satire on mankind. A delicate, rich and unique portrait of an exotic community that in fact represents all of us.". Saibal Chatterjee reviewed the film for NDTV and gave it 4 out of 5 stars, calling it a "a meticulously crafted, hypnotic film that is firm in a deliberate rhythm...Amar Colony heralds the advent of a filmmaker endowed with the ability to see beyond the surface of things and illuminate what lies beneath.

== Filmography ==
Year	Original Title	Language	Genre	Length	Status
2013	Boys Don't Wear Nailpolish!	Hindi & English	Hybrid Documentary	13 minutes	Complete
2015	The Infinite Space	Tibetan / Ladakhi	Mystery Drama	25 minutes	Complete
2016	Papa	Hindi	Absurdist Drama	15 minutes	Complete
2018	Pashi	Hindi & Pahari	Suspense Drama	32 minutes	Complete
2019	Catch the Light	Hindi & English	Mystery Drama	20 minutes	Complete
2020	The Flying Trunk (Udiaando Sindook)	Pahari	Mystery Drama	13 minutes	Complete
2022	Amar Colony	Hindi	Absurdist Drama	75 minutes	Complete
