= Tobdan =

Indian historian and linguist

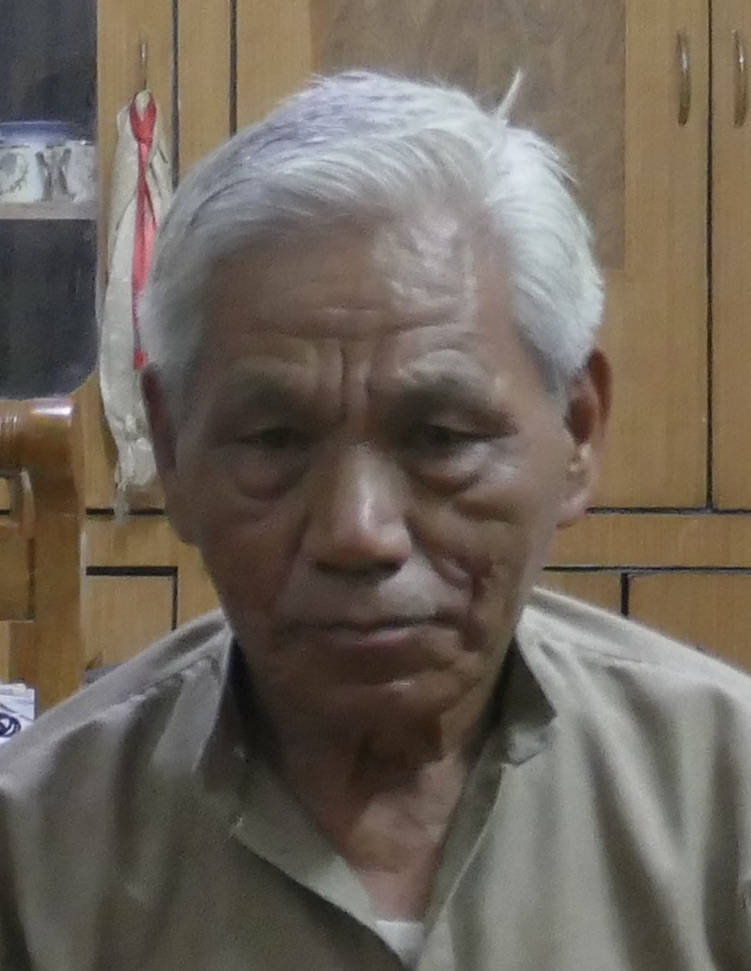
- Born: 1944 (age 81–82); Tod valley, Lahaul tehsil, Kangra district, Punjab Province, British India
- Occupations: Historian and linguist
- Known for: Work on the history, traditions, and languages of Lahaul and some neighbouring regions

Tobdan (born 1944) is a historian and linguist from Himachal Pradesh, India. He is noted for his work on the cultural traditions, histories, and languages of the Lahaul and Spiti district, and some neighboring regions.

== Personal life ==
Tobdan originally belongs to the Tod valley of the Lahaul division of the Lahaul and Spiti district, Himachal Pradesh. He is a retired bank official. He lives in the Kullu valley, Himachal Pradesh. Tobdan is multilingual. He is fluent in his native sTodpa, Hindi, English, and Punjabi, and is conversant in most of the languages spoken in Himachal Pradesh, Ladakh, and Spiti.

== Works ==
Tobdan's work as a historian has focused on the western Himalayan regions of Lahaul, Kullu, and Kinnaur, and the trans-Himalayan regions of Spiti and Ladakh. As a linguist he specializes in the Tibetic languages of the Lahaul and Spiti district (see Bibliography).

Tobdan was among the founder-members of the non-governmental organization 'Society for Conservation and Promotion of Culture in Lahaul & Spiti', and the chief editor of its annual, and later bi-annual magazine Kunzom, which was published from 2005 to 2014. Kunzom published short stories, poems, folksongs and grammatical sketches in various languages spoken in the Lahaul and Spiti district.

Tobdan writes in English, Hindi, and Tibetan.

== Views ==
- Tobdan supports the claim that Buddhism was present in Lahaul before the advent of Tibetan Buddhism, and discusses them in some of his Lahaul-based works.
- In 2010, he opposed diverting water from natural water channels for hydroelectric dams in the Lahaul region.
- In a 2021 interview, he expressed support for the preservation of the near-extinct Tankri script of the western Himalayas.
- In another 2021 interview, Tobdan opined that compared to its neighboring valley Spiti in the Lahaul and Spiti district, Lahaul had received very little scholarly attention. He had intended to bridge that knowledge gap through his body of work and particularly his then-recent book Ancient Lahul and Himalaya.

== Reception ==
Tobdan's works have been cited by many academics and independent scholars as important secondary sources on the histories, languages, and cultures of regions in Himachal Pradesh like Kullu, Lahaul, Spiti, and Kinnaur. These include Moran (2013), Tsering (2014), Bellezza (2015), Rahimzadeh (2016), Bhattacharya (2017), Chamberlain and Chamberlain (2019), and Halperin (2019).

Elizabeth Anne Stutchbury, who conducted her doctoral research in Lahaul in the early 1980s, appreciated Tobdan's early initiative, as a Lahauli local, of studying and documenting his homeland, while decrying the general lack of any in-depth anthropological research on Lahaul at that point of time.

John Bray commends Tobdan and Dorje's book on the Moravian missionaries in western Himalayas (2008) as a valuable contribution that makes information from disparate sources on this subject more readily available.

== Recognition ==
- Tobdan was the editor of the Himachal Pradesh volume of the People's Linguistic Survey of India, which was led by G.N. Devy (who was also the series editor).
- He has been the member of the Governing Body of the Himachal Pradesh Academy of Arts, Culture, and Languages.
- He was among the main contributors of the Academy's 2011 volume (in Hindi) on the life and cultures of Lahaul and Spiti district.
- Some volumes of the Kunzom magazine's have been digitally archived on archive.org.

== Bibliography ==
As of 2021, Tobdan had written the following books:

1. Tobdan. 1984. History and Religions of Lahul: From The Earliest To Circa A.D. 1950. Delhi: Books Today.
2. Tobdan. 1993. The People of the Upper Valley: The Stodpas of Lahul in the Himalayas. Delhi: Book India Publishing.
3. Tobdan, and Chhering Dorje. 1996. Historical Documents from Western Trans-Himalaya. Lahul, Zanskar and Ladakh. Delhi: Book India Publishing.
4. Tobdan. 2008. Cultural History of Western Trans-Himalayas: Bashahar Kinnaur. Aryan Books.
5. Tobdan. 2008. Moravian Missionaries in Western Trans-Himalaya: Lahul Ladakh and Kinnaur. Delhi: Kaveri Books.
6. Tobdan. 2011. Exploring Malana: An Ancient Culture Hidden in the Himalayas. Indus Publishers.
7. Tobdan. 2015. Nathapanth in Western Himalaya. Delhi: Kaveri Books.
8. Tobdan. 2015. Spiti: A Study in Socio-Cultural Traditions. Delhi: Kaveri Books.
9. Tobdan. 2015. A Grammar of sTodpa (A Language of Lahul in the Western Himalaya). Kaithal: Amrit Books.
10. Devy, G.N., and Tobdan, eds. 2017. The Languages of Himachal Pradesh: People’s Linguistic Survey of India. Volume Eleven. Orient Blackswan.
11. Tobdan. 2019. Zong Gonpa of Village Tinno. New Delhi: Kaveri Books.
12. Tobdan. 2020. sTodpa Language of Lahul in the Himalaya. Delhi: Kaveri Books.
13. Tobdan. 2020. Bhoti Parichay: Vyakaran aur Anuvad (in Hindi). Delhi: Kaveri Books.
14. Tobdan. 2021. Ancient Lahaul and Himalaya. Delhi: Kaveri Books.
15. Tobdan. 2022. The Brave Soldiers of Lahaul - the Saviours of Ladakh in 1948. Delhi: Kaveri Books.
