= Martin Randall Travel =

Travel agency in the United Kingdom

- Industry: Tour operator
- Founded: November 1988
- Founder: Martin Randall
- Headquarters: 10 Barley Mow Passage, London, W4 4PH, United Kingdom
- Area served: UK, United States, Australia
- Key people: Peter Liney (Chairman)
- Number of employees: 50+
- Website: https://www.martinrandall.com

Martin Randall Travel is a cultural tour operator in Britain, with offices in the US and Australia. It specialises in tours for small groups to over 50 destinations, as well as its own classical music festivals and cultural cruises. Its tours are led by expert speakers, who are specially selected academics, writers and curators.

In 2024, Martin Randall Travel was purchased by private equity investor firm Piper.

== History ==
The company was founded in 1988 by Martin Randall, a former student of history of art at the Courtauld Institute of Art, London. He had previously set up Prospect Art Tours in 1982. Its primary focus is the organisation of tours for small groups, led by a lecturer who is an expert in their field. The first tour was Franconia at Christmas.

In 1994, the company expanded into producing its own large music festivals, working with internationally renowned musicians, with the premise of matching music and place. Their programme for 2026 contains over 200 tours and events in more than fifty countries. The company has six festivals confirmed for 2026 including Early Music in Yorkshire, The Rhine Piano Festival, Music Along the Rhine, Music Along the Danube, The Bach Journey, and Monteverdi in Venice. Their programme for 2026 contains over two hundred tours and events in more than fifty countries.

== Expert speakers ==
Martin Randall Travel works with a range of subject experts, including:

- Paul Bahn, archaeologist and broadcaster, Britain's leading expert on prehistoric rock art world-wide.
- Amira Bennison, who specialises in the history and culture of the Maghreb at the University of Cambridge's Faculty of Asian and Middle Eastern Studies.
- Desmond Shawe-Taylor, British art historian, former Director of the Dulwich Picture Gallery and former Surveyor of the Queen’s Pictures.
- Gijs van Hensbergen, art historian, gastronomist and best-selling author celebrated for his work on Gaudí and Picasso.
- Juliet Rix, award-winning journalist, author and broadcaster specialising in arts, culture and the history of Malta.
- Giles Tremlett, Madrid-based award-winning historian and journalist acclaimed for his works on Spanish history, medieval and modern.
- Richard Wigmore, music writer, broadcaster and lecturer known for his expertise in Viennese Classics, Lieder and opera.
- Katherine Carter, historian and curator at Chartwell, home of Winston Churchill, a specialist in early 20th-century political history.
- Dr Katy Hamilton, music researcher, writer and presenter recognised for her scholarship on Brahms and 19th-century music.
- Dr Xavier Bray, art historian and Director of the Wallace Collection, noted for his expertise in Spanish art.

== Critical acclaim ==
Martin Randall Travel has received largely favourable reviews, with a 99% AITO rating from over a thousand reviews. Ian Irvine in The Independent said, "All three... highlights from my life as a cultural tourist were part of the remarkable series of music festivals run by Martin Randall." Christine Headley praised Martin Randall Travel's handling of money – covering most costs and distributing local currency - on the festival she attended. Kenneth Asch wrote in the Travellers' Handbook, "Of all the travel services I have researched, Martin Randall Travel is perhaps the most comprehensive, culturally speaking."

Martin Randall Travel won the British Travel Awards: Best Special Interest Holiday Company (Small) award in 2015, 2016, 2017, 2018 & 2019.At the 2025 AITO Awards, Martin Randall was named Silver Tour Operator of the Year.

== Directors ==
- Graham Horner (CEO)
- Samantha Clarke (CFO)
