= Himachal Pradesh University =

University in Himachal Pradesh, India

Coordinates: 31.1115°N 77.1390°E

- Motto in English: Those, who are armed with knowledge, are skillful
- Type: Public
- Established: 22 July 1970; 55 years ago
- Affiliations: UGC; AIU; ACU; NAAC
- Chancellor: Governor of Himachal Pradesh
- Vice-Chancellor: Mahavir Singh
- Location: Summer Hill, Shimla, Himachal Pradesh, India
- Campus: Urban
- Colours: Green
- Website: www.hpuniv.ac.in

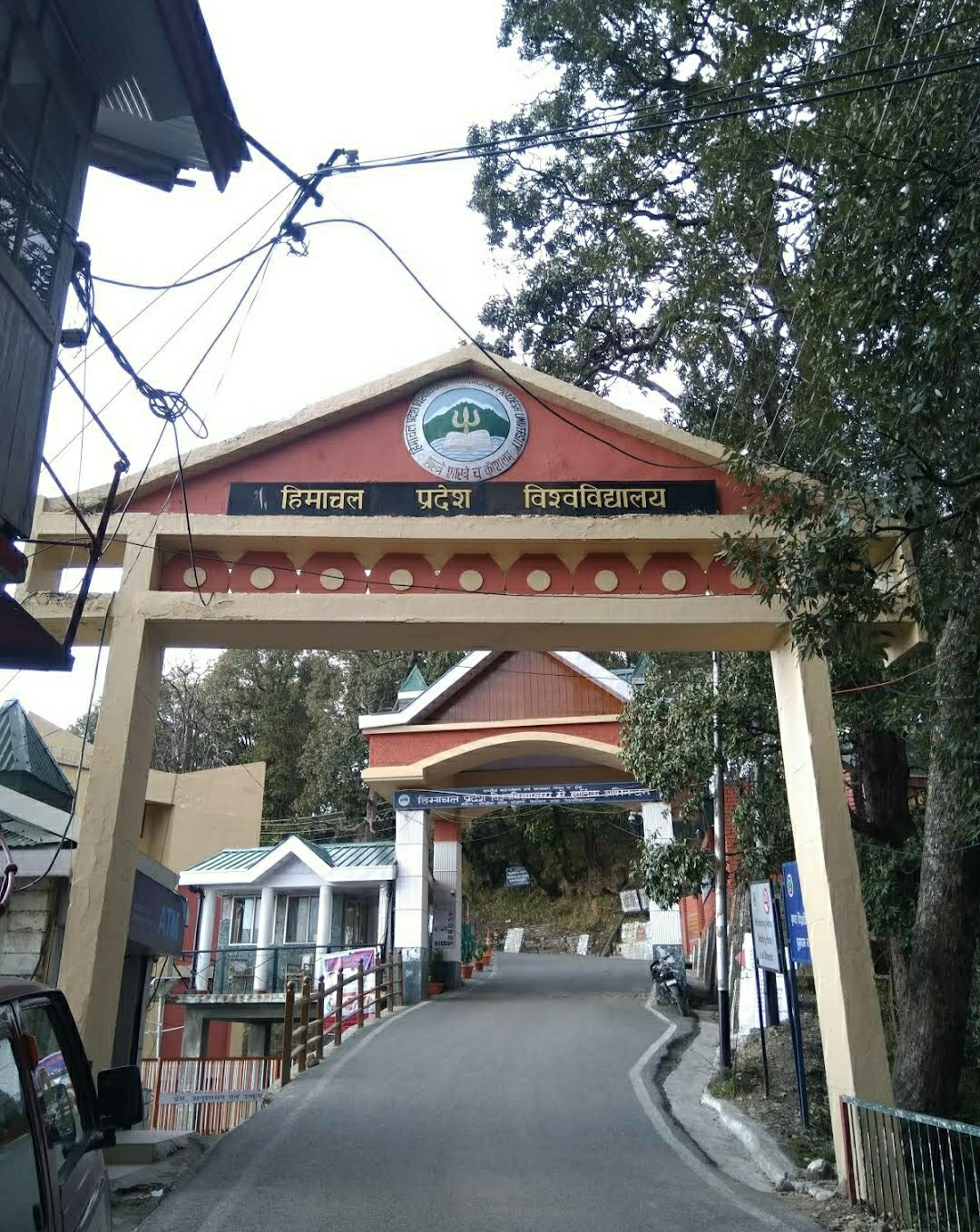
Entrance gate of Himachal Pradesh University

Himachal Pradesh University (HPU) is a public state university at Summer Hill, Shimla, Himachal Pradesh. It was established on 22 July 1970 by The Himachal Pradesh University Act, 1970 (HP Act No 17 of 1970) by the Himachal Pradesh Legislative Assembly.

The university has been awarded Grade 'A' by NAAC.

The University has a total of 13 faculties, 11 of which comprise 52 departments and 5 centers and institutes, which run 132 academic programmes.

== Constituent colleges and institutes ==
- Himachal Pradesh University Regional Centre, Dharamshala
- Himachal Pradesh University Business School
- University College of Business Studies, Shimla
- University Institute of Legal Studies, Shimla
- University Institute of Information Technology, Shimla

== General degree Colleges under Himachal Pradesh University ==
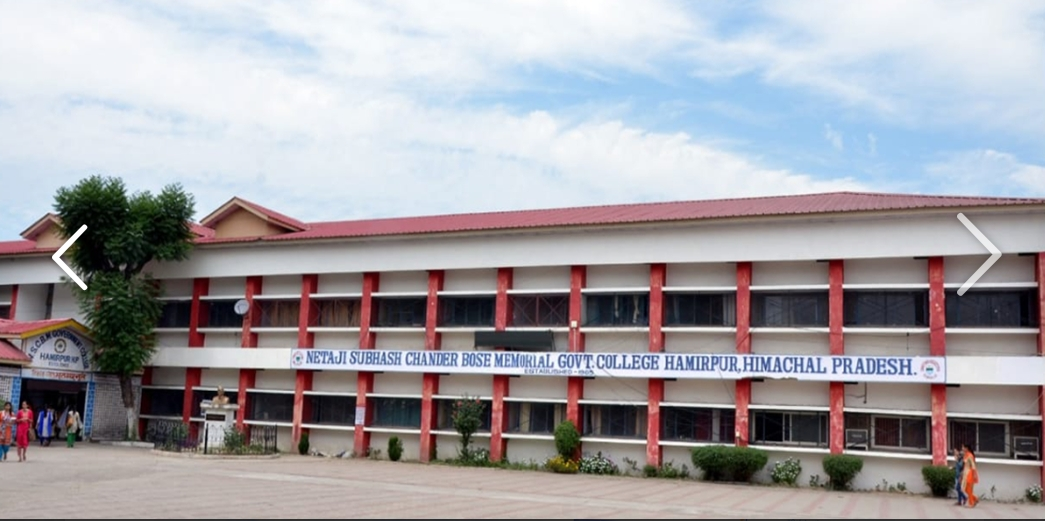
Govt College Hamirpur Building

The University's jurisdiction extends over 7 districts -Bilaspur, Hamirpur, Kinnaur, Shimla, Sirmaur, Solan, Una.

- Government College Sanjauli, Shimla
- Government College Solan
- GB Pant Memorial Govt Degree College, Rampur Bushahr
- Government Degree College, Kumarsain
- Government College, Barsar hamirpur
- Netaji Subhash Chandra Bose Memorial PG college (formerly Government College Hamirpur) is located in Anu, Hamirpur, Himachal Pradesh
- Rajiv Gandhi Government Degree College, Shimla
- Rajkiya Kanya Maha Vidyalaya, Shimla.

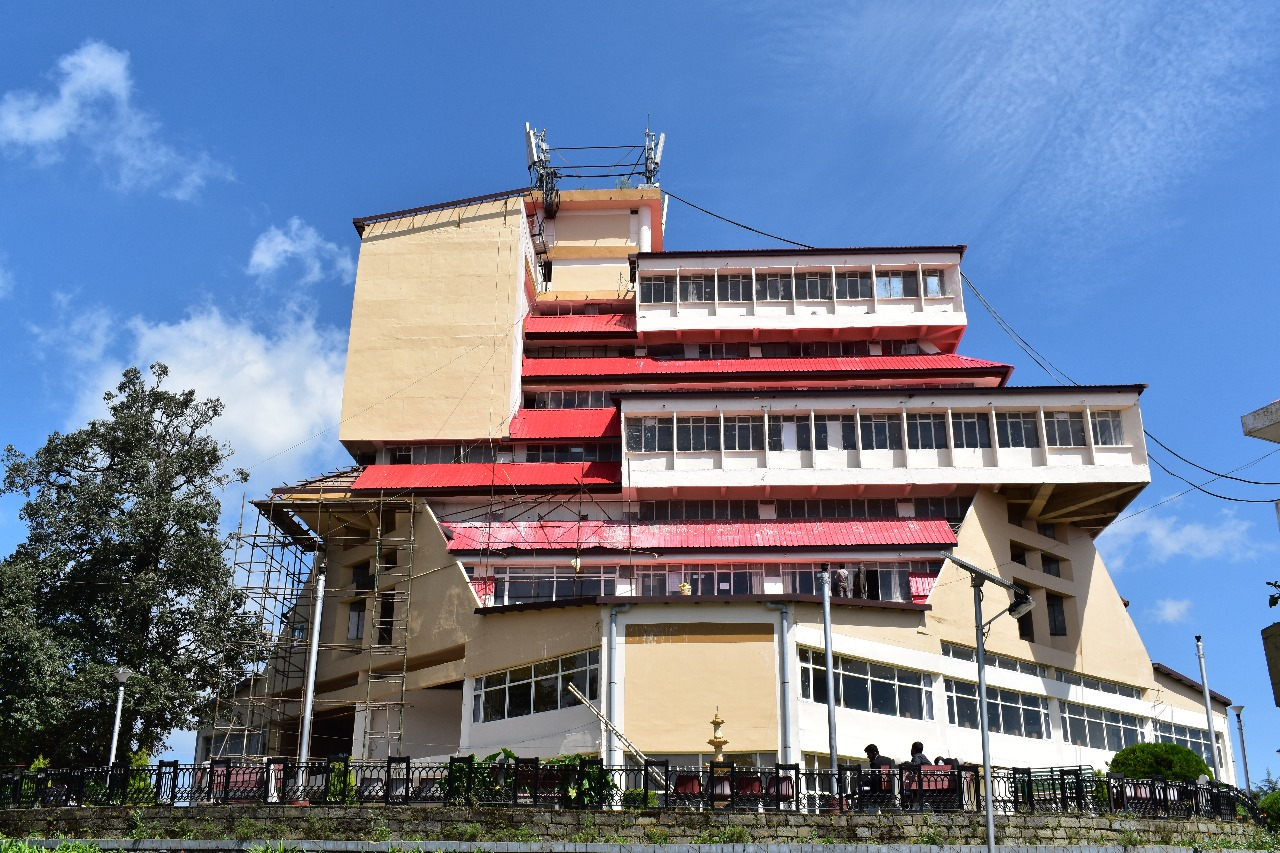
Library of Himachal Pradesh University Shimla

== Notable alumni ==
=== Politics & Governance ===
- Hamid Karzai – former President of Afghanistan, MA in International Relations & Political Science (1983), Doctor of Literature (honorary, 2003)
- J P Nadda – current President of Bharatiya Janata Party and former Union Minister of Health and Family Welfare, LL.B. from Faculty of Law, Himachal Pradesh University
- Anand Sharma – former Union Minister of Commerce and Industry, Government of India, LL.B. from Faculty of Law, Himachal Pradesh University
- Singhi Ram – former Union Minister of Food and Supplies, LL.B. from Faculty of Law, Himachal Pradesh University
- Ram Lal Thakur – former Union Youth Services and Sports Minister, LL.B. from Faculty of Law, Himachal Pradesh University
- Arzu Rana Deuba – politician, Nepal's current Minister of Foreign Affairs, graduated from St. Bedes College
- Ashwani Kumar – former Governor of Nagaland

=== Law & Judiciary ===
- Randeep Guleria – Director of AIIMS, New Delhi, MBBS from Indira Gandhi Medical College
- Sanjay Karol – Judge of the Supreme Court of India, LL.B. from Faculty of Law, Himachal Pradesh University
- Abhilasha Kumari – Judicial Member of Lokpal Committee, LL.B. from Faculty of Law, Himachal Pradesh University

=== Arts, Culture & Entertainment ===
- Anupam Kher – Bollywood and stage actor, attended Government College, Sanjauli
- Mohit Chauhan – Indian singer, M.Sc in Geology from Government College, Dharamshala
- Preity Zinta – Bollywood actress, graduated from St. Bedes College
- Persis Khambatta – Model and actress, graduated from St. Bedes College
- Vijay Sharma – painter, Padma Shri awardee
