= Risalapur =

- Location within Pakistan
- Coordinates: 31.9°N 73.11°E
- Country: Pakistan
- Province: Punjab
- Elevation: 171 m (561 ft)
- Time zone: UTC+5 (PST)

Risalapur is a town located in the Punjab province of Pakistan. It is located at 31°9'0N 73°11'0E with an altitude of 171 metres (564 feet). Neighbouring settlements include Chhajwali and Rurki.
