= Bijani =

- Village
- Bijni
- Interactive map of Bijani
- Country: India
- State: Himachal Pradesh
- District: Mandi
- Established: 1527

Population
  - Total: 1,133

Language
- Time zone: UTC+5:30 (IST)
- PIN: 175001
- Telephone code: 91-01905
- Website: hpmandi.gov.in

Bijani, formerly known as Bijan, is a village 16 miles from the city of Mandi, India. This village is located in the Mandi district, about 540.6 km (335.91 mi) northeast of the country capital, Delhi and 176.5 km (109.67 mi) north of the state capital, Shimla. The location and area by the mountains gives it a temperate seasonal climate. Some of the water supply for the city of Mandi comes from Bijani, with several natural water sources that come through the mountains. Indian Minister of Road Transport Nitin Gadkari announced a major road development from Padhar to Bijani on June 10, 2022. It is divided in two parts, Upper Bijani and Lower Bijani.
