= Kutruwal =

- Location within Pakistan
- Coordinates: 31.8°N 73.11°E
- Country: Pakistan
- Province: Punjab
- Elevation: 172 m (564 ft)
- Time zone: UTC+5 (PST)

Kutruwal is a town located in the Punjab province of Pakistan. It is located at 31°8'30N 73°11'30E with an altitude of 172 metres (567 feet). Neighbouring settlements include Kot Rajput and Risalapur.
