= Manak =

Residential locality in Lahore, Pakistan

- Location within Pakistan
- Coordinates: 31.13°N 73.12°E
- Country: Pakistan
- Province: Punjab
- Elevation: 173 m (568 ft)
- Time zone: UTC+5 (PST)

Manak is a residential town in Lahore District, in the Punjab province of Pakistan. It is located at 31°13'0N 73°12'30E with an altitude of 173 metres (570 feet).

It is located in the Allama Iqbal Zone of Lahore District. Neighbouring settlements include Phadiara, Singh Khalsa and Ghator.
