= Phadiara =

- Location within Pakistan
- Coordinates: 31.14°N 73.11°E
- Country: Pakistan
- Province: Punjab
- Elevation: 175 m (574 ft)
- Time zone: UTC+5 (PST)

Phadiara is a town in Lahore District of the Punjab province of Pakistan. It is located at 31°14'40N 73°11'30E with an altitude of 175 metres (577 feet). Neighbouring settlements include Manak, Singh Khalsa and Gobindsar.
