= Chhajwali =

Coordinates: 31.5464294°N 76.816216°E

- Village
- Location within India
- Country: India
- State: Himachal Pradesh

Chhajwali is a village located in Mandi district in the Indian state of Rajasthan.

== Demographics ==
As per 2011 Census, Chhajwali has a population of 485 of which 248 are males while 237 are females. Chhajwali village's average sex ratio is 956, which is lower than the state average of 972 for Himachal Pradesh. According to the census, the Chhajwali child sex ratio is 750, which is lower than the 909 average for Himachal Pradesh.

== Literacy ==
Chhajwali village's literacy rate in 2011 was 82.22%, compared to 82.80% for all of Himachal Pradesh. Male literacy rate in Chhajwali is 91.23% while the female rate is 72.97%.
