= Victoria Bridge, Mandi =

Coordinates: 31.7128543°N 76.9303231°E

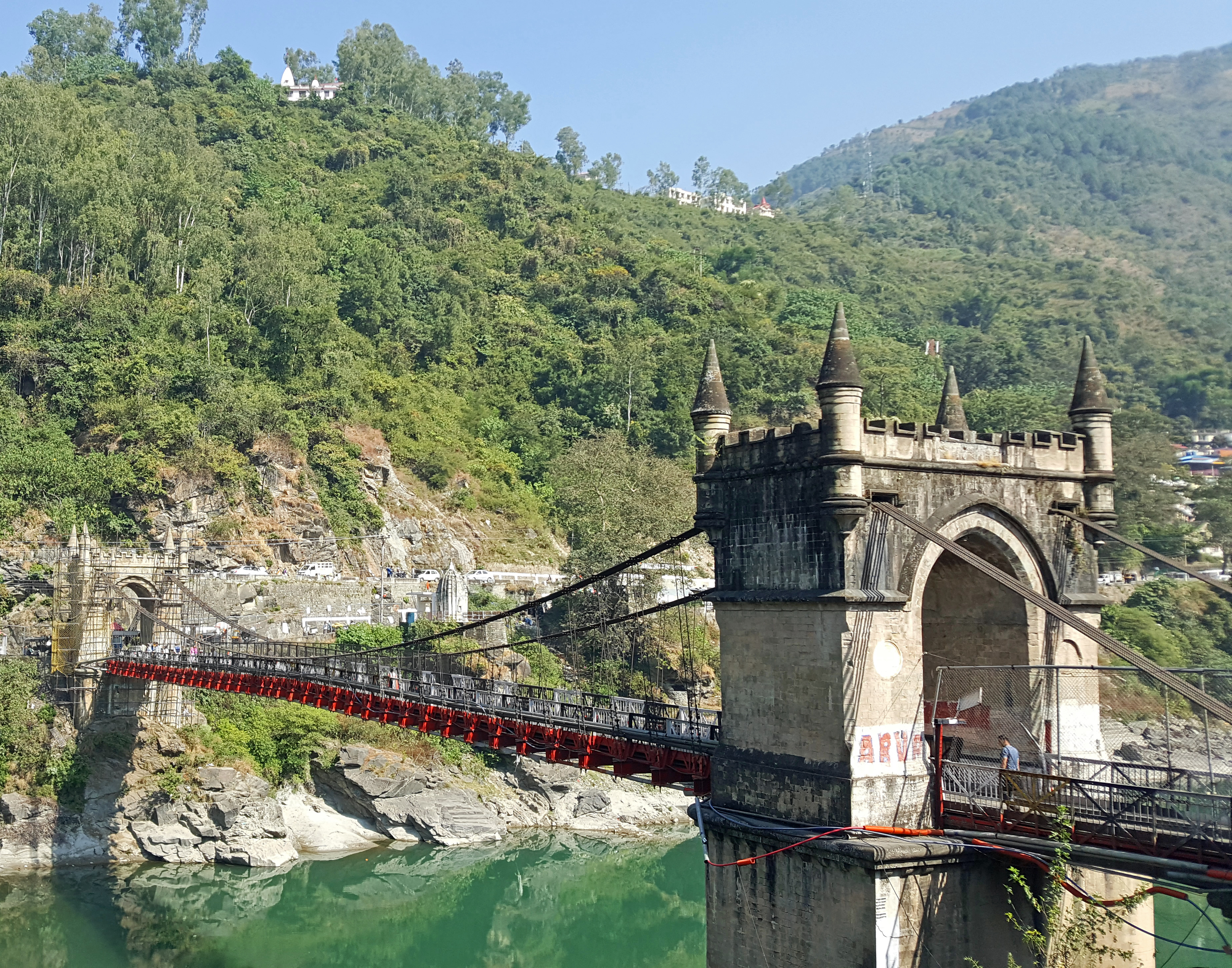

Victoria Bridge links Purani Mandi and Mandi town in Himachal Pradesh, India. It was built in 1877 under Raja Vijay Singh, ruler of Mandi with assistance from Britain.

The Bridge resembles the original 1858 hanging Chelsea Bridge (initially called Victoria Bridge) on the Thames River. It is also like Jhulla bridges and can carry small vehicles. However, as this is a heritage bridge, the Government of Himachal Pradesh built and inaugurated another bridge named Sardar Patel Bridge (or New Victoria Bridge) in 2019 near Victoria Bridge for transport. Victoria Bridge was closed for all means of transport after its 142 years of service.

In 2020, a thanksgiving ceremony was organized by Himachal Pradesh Government's Mandi branch, Mandi council and National Culture Fund. The bridge was decorated with flowers and carpets and a worshipping "yagna" ceremony was offered. This was done to show respect to the bridge which suffered so much onslaughts of river flood but stood tall and gave service for 142 years. The bridge would be maintained and rigorously repaired, assured the Ministry, as it is a cynosure of the tourism industry.
