= Mandi Municipal Corporation =

Local civic body of Mandi, Himachal Pradesh, India

Type
- Type: Municipal Corporation

History
- Founded: 2020; 6 years ago

Leadership
- Mayor: Suman Thakur, BJP since 2026
- Deputy Mayor: Jitendar Sharma, BJP since 2026
- Municipal commissioner: Rohit Rathour, HPAS

Structure
- Seats: 15
- Political groups: Government (12): BJP (12); Opposition (1): INC (1); IND (1); Vacant (1): Vacant (1) (Note: People of Ward No. 14 (Behna) boycotted the election)
- Length of term: 5 Years

Elections
- Last election: 17 May 2026
- Next election: 2031

Meeting place
- Mandi, Himachal Pradesh

Website
- Official website

Mandi Municipal Corporation (MMC) is the municipal corporation of Mandi District in Himachal Pradesh, and is the chief nodal agency for the administration of the city. Municipal Corporation mechanism in India was introduced during British Rule with formation of municipal corporation in Madras (Chennai) in 1688, later followed by municipal corporations in Bombay (Mumbai) and Calcutta (Kolkata) by 1762. Sitamarhi Municipal Corporation is headed by Mayor of city and governed by Commissioner. Mandi Municipal Corporation has been formed with functions to improve the infrastructure of town.

== History and administration ==
Mandi Municipal Corporation was formed to improve the infrastructure of the town as per the needs of local population. Mandi Municipal Corporation has been categorised into wards and each ward is headed by councillor for which elections are held every 5 years.

Mandi Municipal Corporation is governed by Mayor Suman Thakur and administered by Municipal Commissioner Rohit Rathour, HPAS.

== Revenue sources ==
The following are the Income sources for the corporation from the Central and State Government.

=== Revenue from taxes ===
Following is the Tax related revenue for the corporation.

- Property tax.
- Profession tax.
- Entertainment tax.
- Grants from Central and State Government like Goods and Services Tax.
- Advertisement tax.

=== Revenue from non-tax sources ===
Following is the Non Tax related revenue for the corporation.

- Water usage charges.
- Fees from Documentation services.
- Rent received from municipal property.
- Funds from municipal bonds.

== Elections ==
=== 2026 ===
| S.No. | Party name | Party symbol | Councillors | Change | Wards |
|---|---|---|---|---|---|
| 1. | BJP | | 12 | ▲1 | 15 |
| 2. | INC | | 1 | ▼3 | 15 |
| 3. | IND | | 1 | ▲1 | 15 |
| 4. | Vacant | 1 | | | 15 |

=== 2021 ===
| S.No. | Party name | Party symbol | Councillors | Change | Wards |
|---|---|---|---|---|---|
| 1. | BJP | | 11 | Steady | 15 |
| 2. | INC | | 4 | Steady | 15 |
