= Shaheed Krishan Chand Memorial Stadium =

Cricket ground in Mandi, Himachal Pradesh, India

Coordinates: 31°42′22.56″N 76°56′13.19″E

- Paddal ground
- Interactive map of Shaheed Krishan Chand Memorial Stadium

Ground information
- Location: Mandi, India
- Country: India
- Establishment: 1995 (first recorded match)

Team information
Himachal Pradesh	(1995–1999)
- As of 29 October 2011; Source: Ground profile

Shaheed Krishan Chand Memorial Stadium (previously known as the Paddal Ground) is a cricket ground in Mandi, Himachal Pradesh, India. The ground first held a first-class match in November 1986 when Himachal Pradesh played Jammu and Kashmir in the 1986/87 Ranji Trophy. The ground has held ten further first-class matches, the last of which came in the 2001/02 Ranji Trophy between Himachal Pradesh and Jammu and Kashmir. The first List A match held on the ground came in the 1987/88 Deodhar Trophy when the North Zone played the South Zone. Himachal Pradesh first played a List A match there in 1994/95 Ranji Trophy one-day competition when Punjab were the visiting team. Between the 1994/95 season and the 1999/00 season, Himachal Pradesh played five List A fixtures there. The last game in that format to be held there came in the 2001/02 Deodhar Trophy when East Zone played the South Zone. It has 800m track.

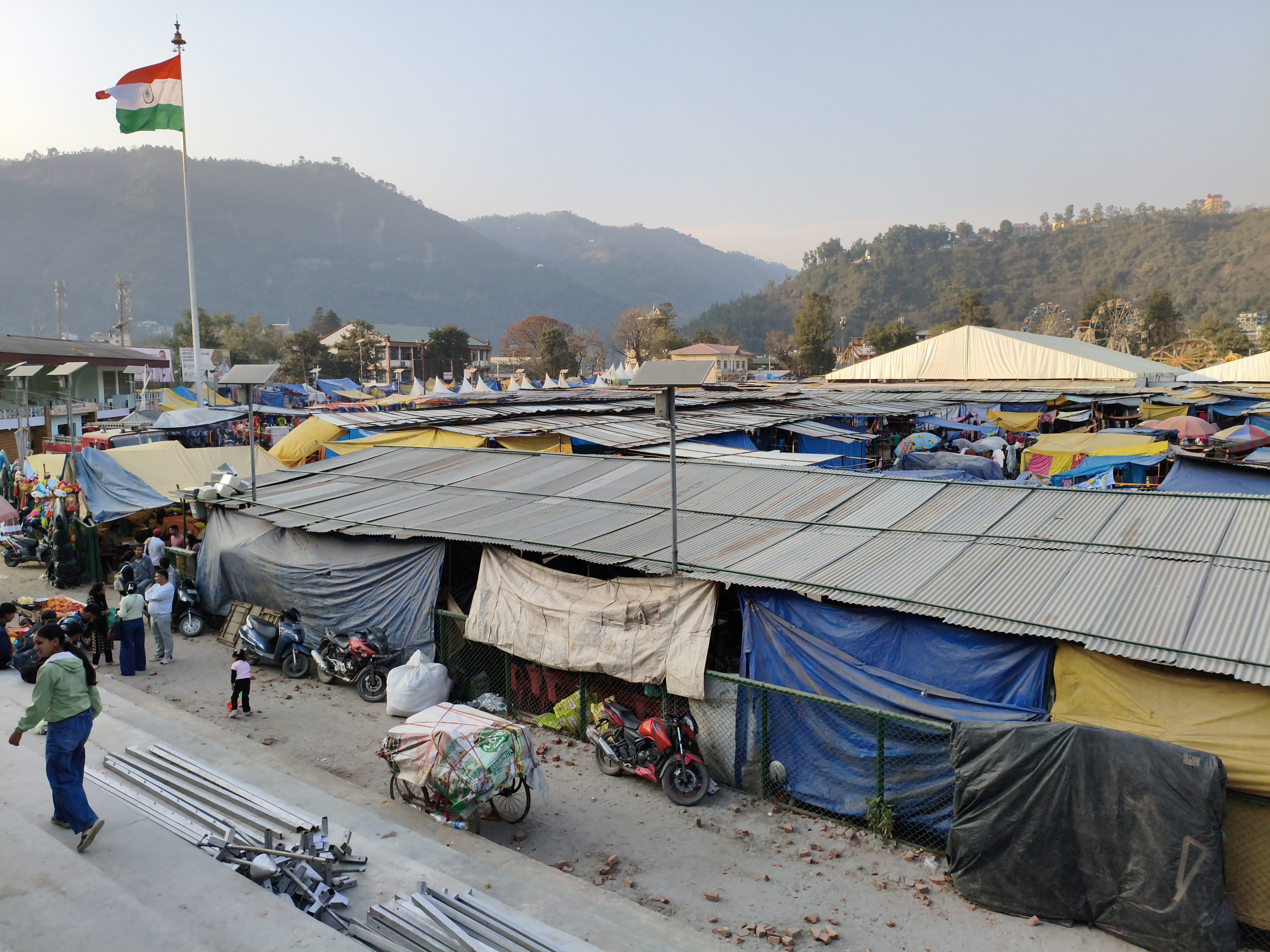
Shivratri fair being organised at the Shaheed Krishan Chand Memorial Stadium
