= Rurki =

- Location within Pakistan
- Coordinates: 31.12°N 73.12°E
- Country: Pakistan
- Province: Punjab
- Elevation: 175 m (574 ft)
- Time zone: UTC+5 (PST)

Rurki is a town in the Punjab province of Pakistan. It is located in Lahore District at 31°11'0N 73°11'0E at 175 metres (577 feet) above sea level. Neighbouring settlements include Ghator and Kot Rajput.
