= Ghator =

- Location within Pakistan
- Coordinates: 31.12°N 73.11°E
- Country: Pakistan
- Province: Punjab
- Elevation: 175 m (574 ft)
- Time zone: UTC+5 (PST)

Ghator is a town in Faisalabad District of the Punjab province of Pakistan. It is located at 31°12'0N 73°11'0E at an altitude of 175 metres (577 feet). Neighbouring settlements include Rurki and Manak.
