= Mandi, Himachal Pradesh =

City in Himachal Pradesh, India

Mandi Mandav Nagar
- City
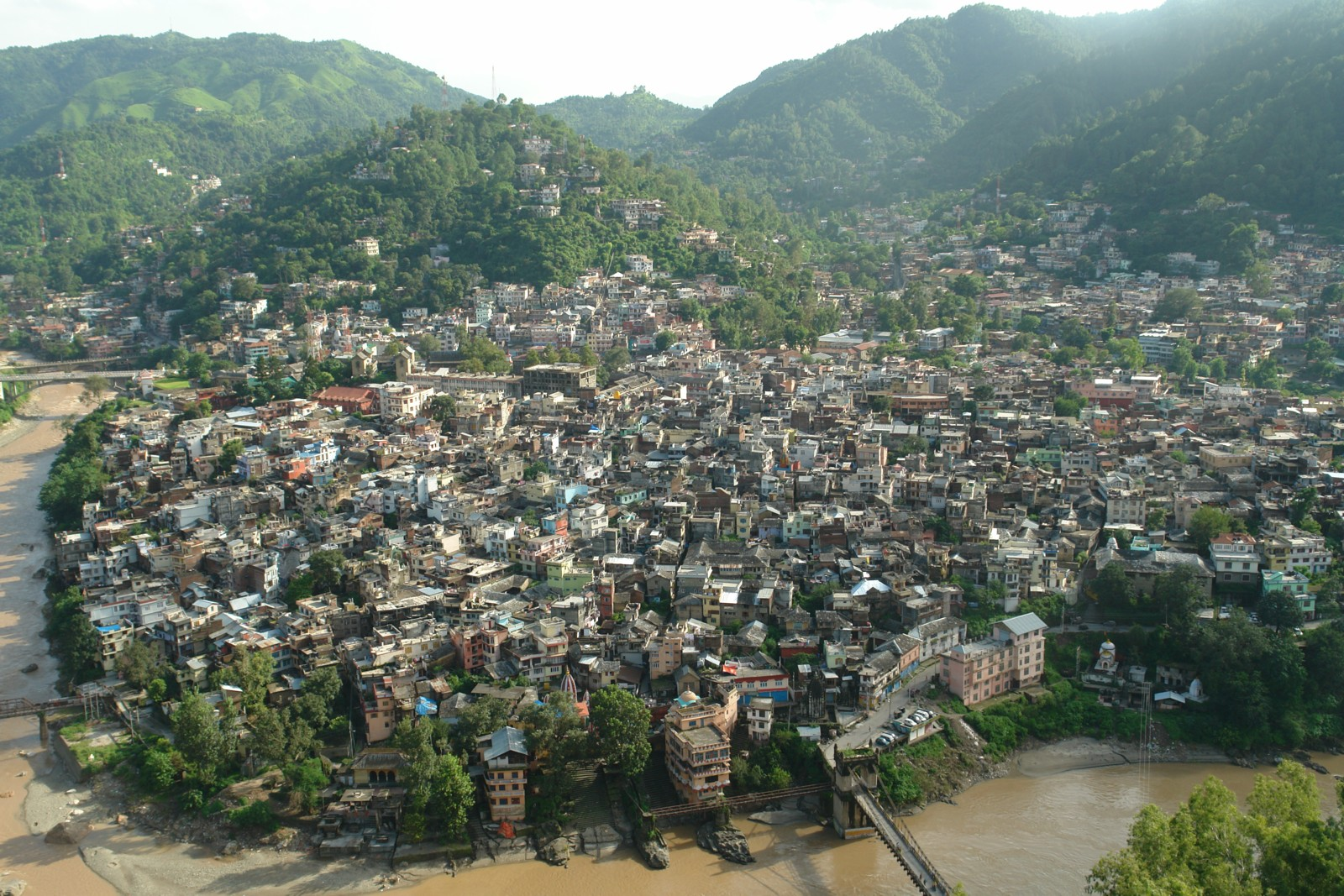
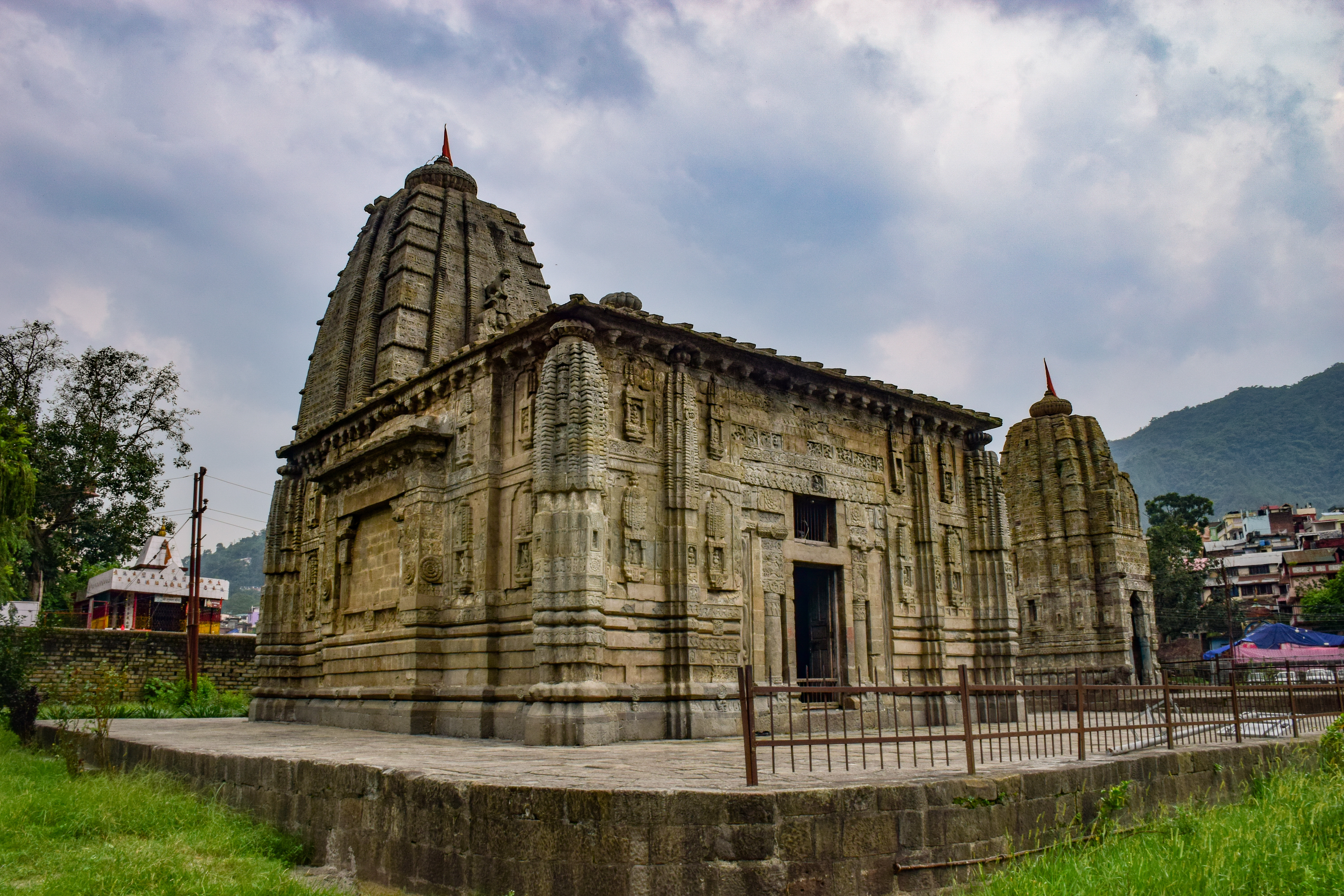
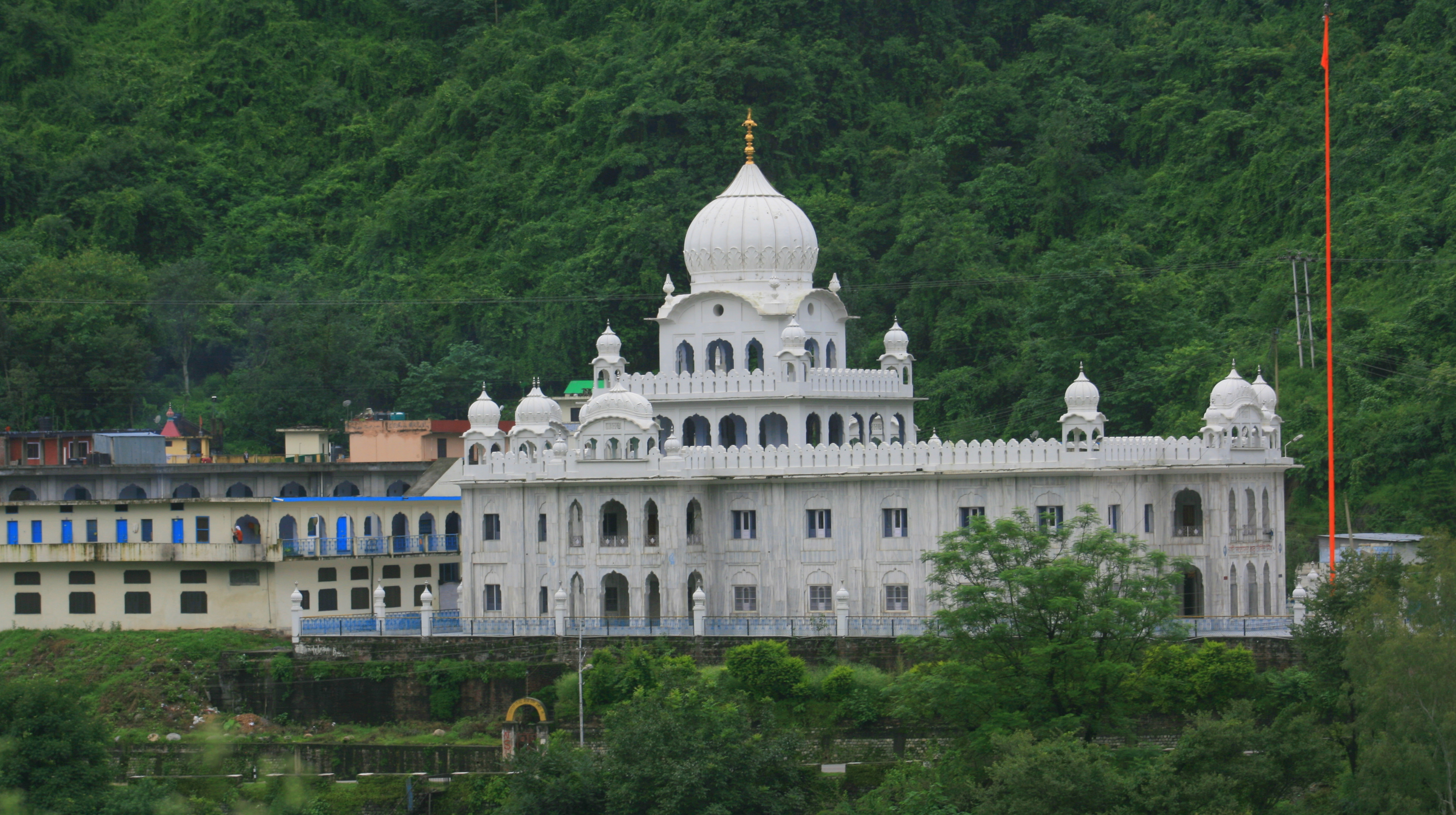
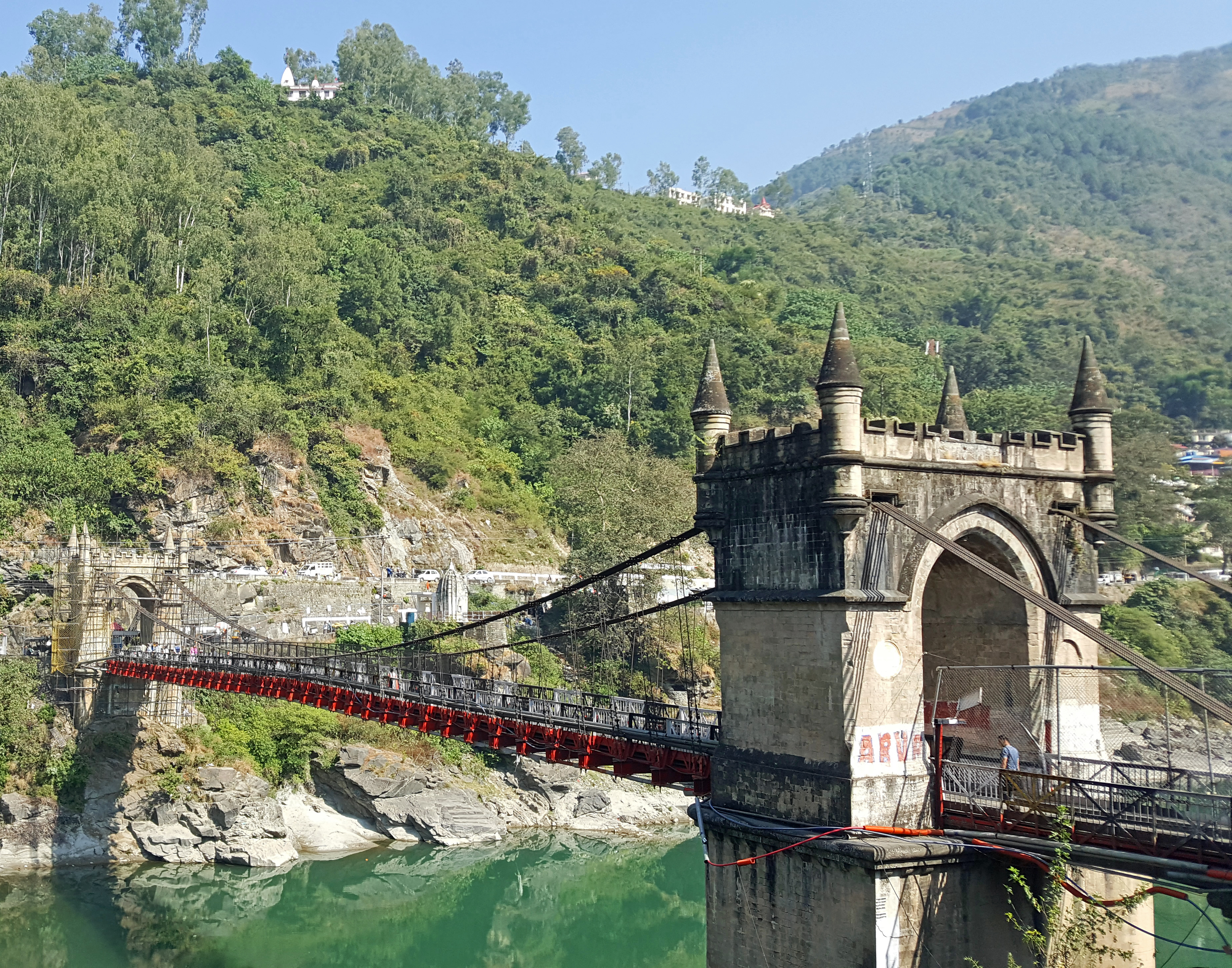
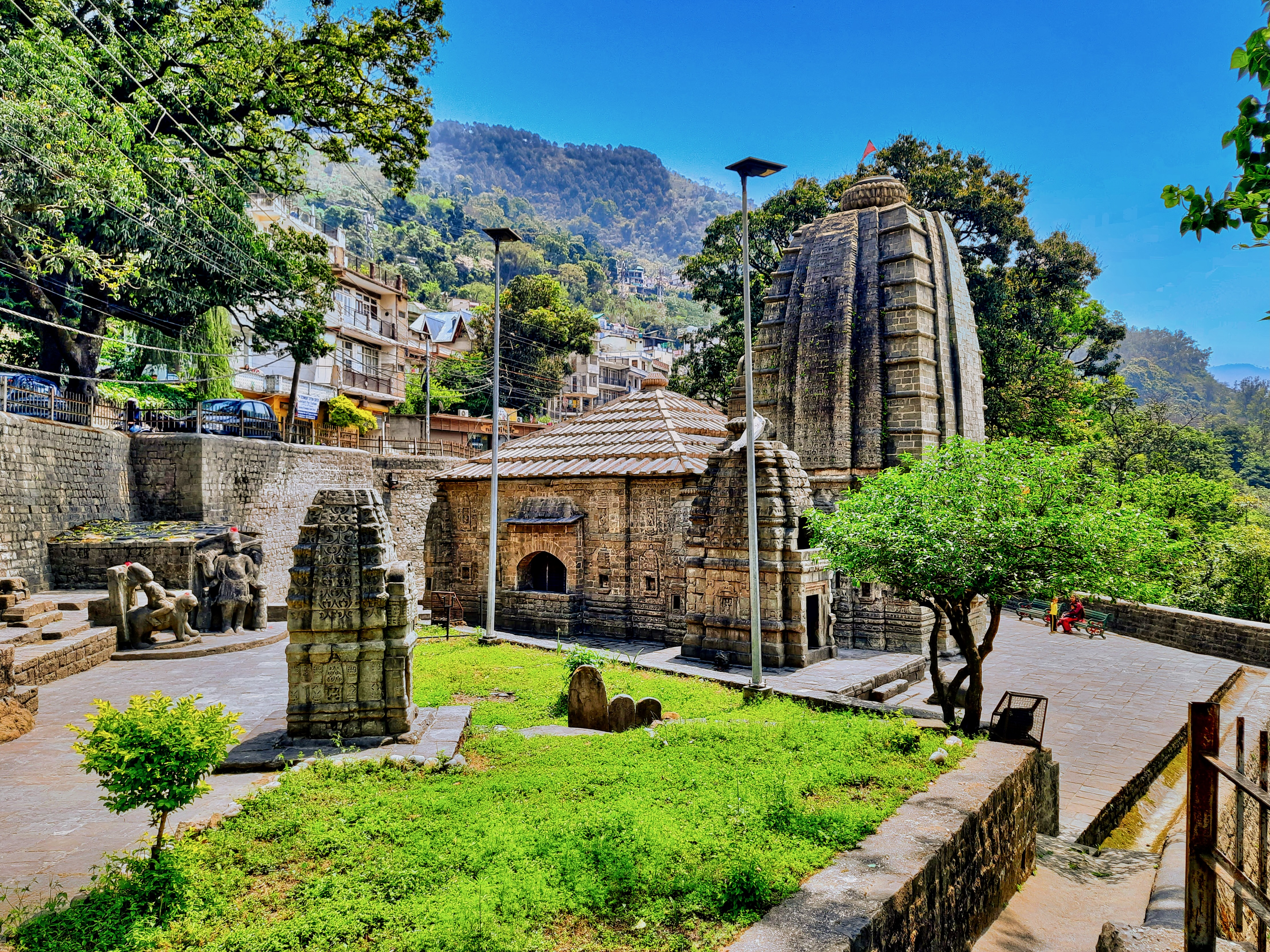
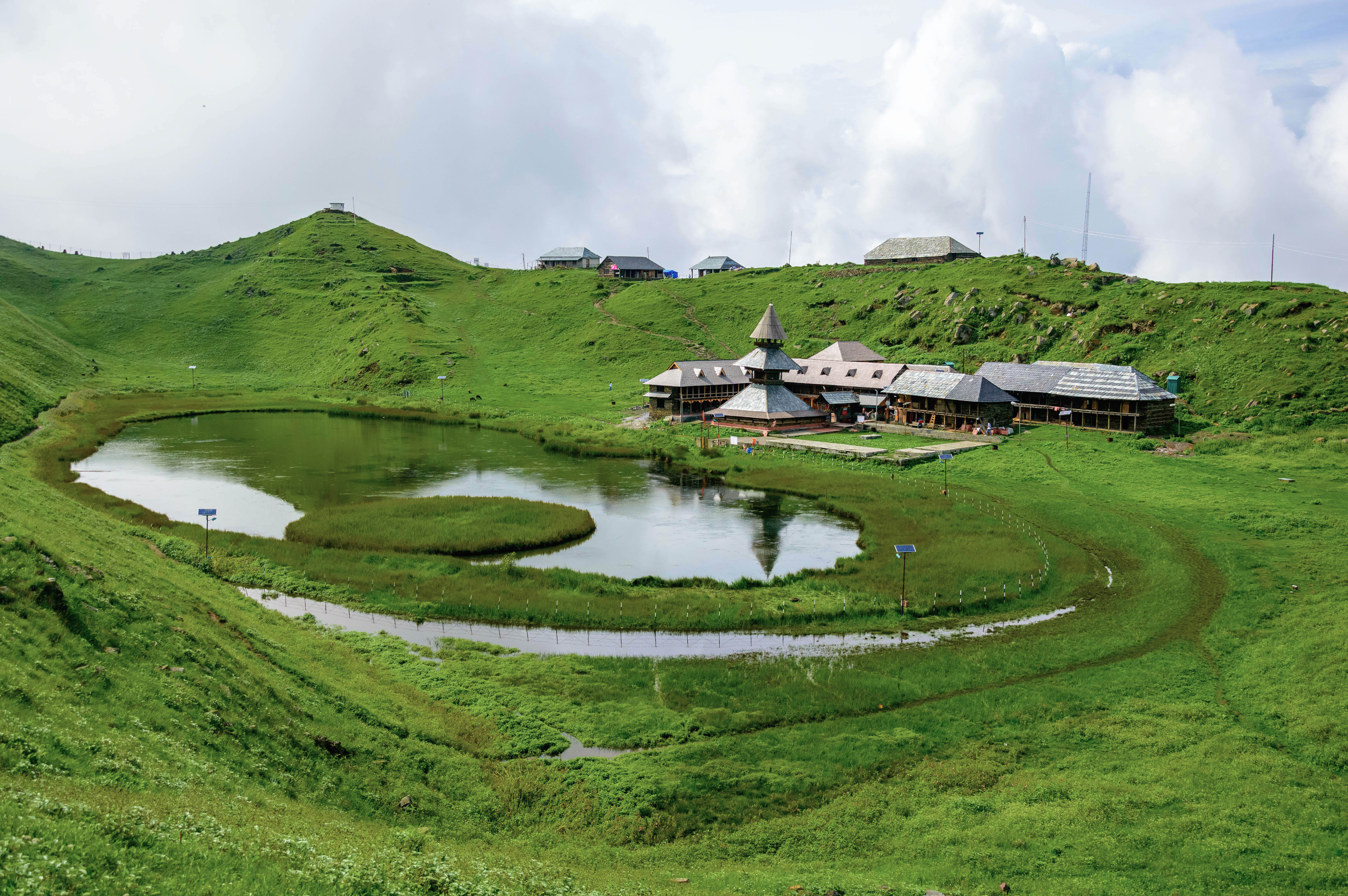
- From top, left to right: Panoramic view of Mandi, Panchvaktra Temple, Sri Guru Gobind Gurudwara, Victoria Bridge, Trilokinath group of temples, Prashar lake

- Location within Himachal Pradesh Location within India
- Coordinates: 31°42′25″N 76°55′54″E
- Country: India
- State: Himachal Pradesh
- District: Mandi
- Established: 1527

Government
  - Type: Municipal Corporation
  - Body: Mandi Municipal Corporation
- Elevation: 760 m (2,490 ft)

Population (2011)
  - Total: 26,422
  - Rank: 6 in HP

Languages
  - Official: Hindi
  - Regional: Mandeali
- Time zone: UTC+5:30 (IST)
- PIN: 175 001
- Telephone code: 91-01905
- Vehicle registration: HP-32, HP-33
- Sex ratio: 1000/1013 (♂/♀)
- Literacy: 83.5%
- Lok Sabha constituency: Mandi (Lok Sabha Constituency)
- Climate: Cwa
- Website: hpmandi.gov.in

Mandi (formerly known as Mandav Nagar) is a major city and a municipal corporation in Mandi District in the Indian state of Himachal Pradesh. It serves as the headquarters of Mandi District and Zonal Headquarters of central zone including districts namely Kullu, Bilaspur, and Hamirpur. In the 2011 Indian census, Mandi had a population of 26,422. Mandi district is currently the 4th largest economy in the state. Mandi has the second highest sex ratio in the state - 1,013 females per 1,000 males.

Mandi was established in 1527 by Ajbar Sen, as the seat of the Mandi State, a princely state till 1948. Foundation of the town was laid on the establishment of Himachal Pradesh in early 1948. Today, it is widely known for the International Mandi Shivaratri Fair. Mandi is also the first heritage city of Himachal Pradesh. It also has the remains of old palaces and notable examples of 'colonial' architecture. Mandi has some of the oldest buildings of Himachal Pradesh, including Victoria Bridge, built in 1877.

It is situated 145 kilometres (90 mi) north of the state capital, Shimla in the north-west Himalayas at an average altitude of 880 m (2,890 ft) Mandi is connected to the city Pathankot through National Highway 154 and to Manali and Chandigarh through National Highway 5. Mandi is approximately 163 km (101 mi) from Chandigarh, the nearest major city, and 395 km (245 mi) from New Delhi, the national capital.

As a tourist place, Mandi is often referred to as "Varanasi of Hills" or "Choti Kashi" or "Kashi of Himachal". Mandi is also the starting point for the Prashar lake trek. From Mandi, trekkers go to Bagi village, which serves as the base village for Prashar lake. Indian Institute of Technology (IIT) Mandi is a premier institute located 15 kilometres (9.3 mi) from Mandi town.

== Etymology ==
The name "Mandi" (and the former name "Mandav Nagar") has its roots from Great Sage Rishi 'Mandav' who did Spiritual Sadhana in this area, and the rocks turned black due to the severity of his penance. Alternatively, the name may have been derived from the common word mandi which means "market" in Hindi. It may possibly be connected with the Sanskrit root mandaptika, meaning "an open hall or shed,".

While the town's name has always been pronounced "[mŋɖɪ]" in the local language, the anglicised version "Mandav Nagar" was the official name until it was changed to "Mandi". This change is now the most widely used name for the town. Mandi is renowned for its 81 ancient old stone Shaivite temples and their enormous range of fine carving. Because of this, it is also often called the "Varanasi of the Hills".

== History ==
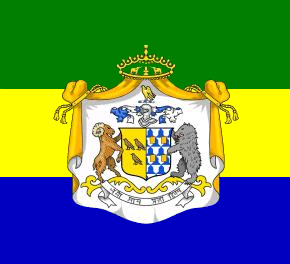
Flag of Princely State of Mandi

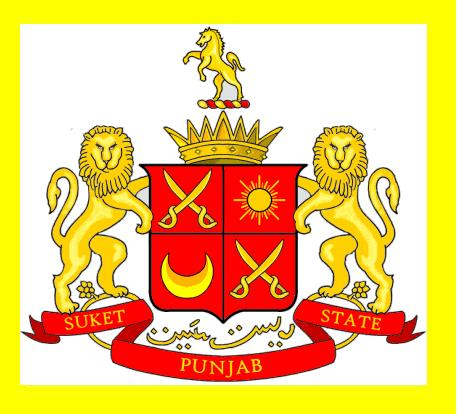
Flag of Princely State of Suket

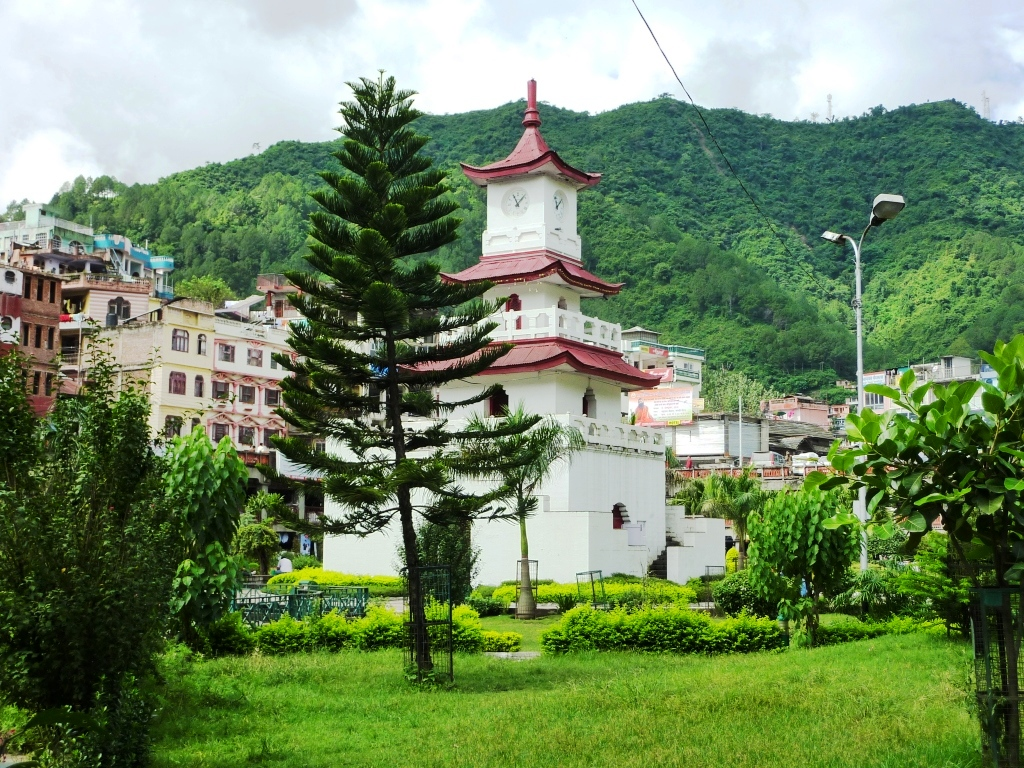
Clock Tower, Mandi, HP, India

The present District of Mandi was formed with the merger of two princely states, Mandi State and Suket State, on 15 April 1948, when the State of Himachal Pradesh was established. Until the mid-20th century, Mandi was on the trade route between Yarkant County and Ladakh to Hoshiarpur and the Indian plains, served as commercial hub and trade centre.

=== Historical events ===
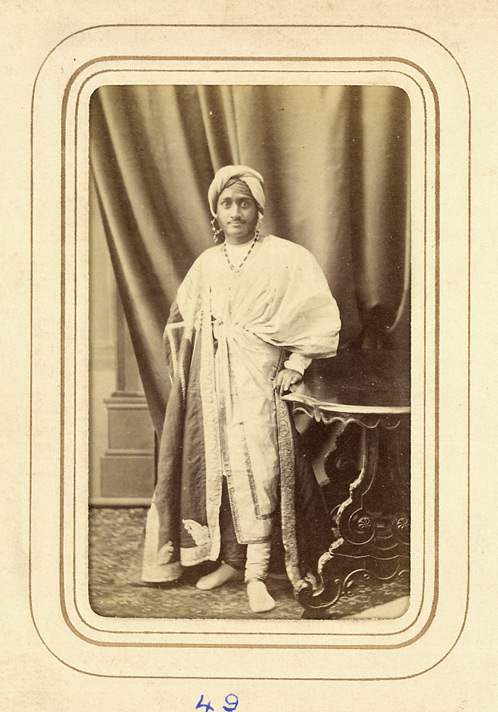
Raja Bijai/Vijay Sen, 16th Raja of Mandi

The princely state of Mandi was founded by Bahu Sen in 1200 AD. But Ajbar Sen was the one who founded the historical town of Mandi in 1526 AD. The Chiefs of Mandi State are said to be the descendants of common ancestors of the Chandervanshi line of Rajputs of Sen dynasty of Bengal who claim to be the descendants of Pandavas of Mahabharata times. The present District of Mandi was formed with the merger of two princely states Mandi State and Suket (Sunder Nagar) on 15 April 1948, when the State of Himachal Pradesh was established. Ajbar Sen assassinated Mandi, it led to the beginning of the modern period of Mandi history. Old Mandi capital was abandoned, and the site of present capital was acquired. Some historians put the selection of present capital in the year 1527 AD. The idol of Madho Rai, the presiding deity of Mandi and incarnation of Lord Vishnu is said to be made by Goldsmith Bhima, in 1648. Maharaja Ranjit Singh occupied Mandi in 1839 but Ranjit Singh died on 27 June 1839. It was beginning of the disintegration of Sikh powers in the hills and British power emerged as most powerful. In 1849, Princely states of Mandi, Suket and Chamba were put under the control of Superintendent 'Cis-Satluj States'.

Lala Lajpat Rai visited Mandi during 1906 to organise the revolutionary activities. The revolt occurred in Mandi State against the repressive, corrupt and arrogant administration of Raja Bhawani Sen and his Wazir Jiwa Nand Paddha. This revolt was led by Shobha Ram in 1909. A prominent revolutionary of Mandi, Hardev Ram joined a revolutionary band of patriots in 1913. He went to Shanghai, America and Japan where he met Lala Hardayal and Dr. Mathura Singh. Another revolutionary of Mandi Bhai Hirda Ram started participating in revolutionary activities in 1914. He joined Ras Behari Bose, Sant Baba Wasakha Singh Dadehar, Mathura Singh, Kartar Singh Sarba, Bhai Parma Nand and Pingle. In 1915, on the request of Sarla Devi, wife of Bhai Hirda Ram, the Viceroy converted his death sentence into life imprisonment. In the same year, Nagchala Dacoity in Mandi state took place. In Mandi's conspiracy case, Mandi revolutionary Sidhu Kharara was sentenced for seven years in 1917. Mandi Legislative Council was constituted in 1933. Swami Purna Nand of Mandi was elected as president of "Himalayan Hill states regional Council" (founded in 1945) & Pt. Padam Dev became its general secretary. The session of "Himalayan Hill states regional Council" was held at Mandi from 8 March 1946 to 10 March 1946. It was also attended by INA activists Dhillon, Sehgal and Shah Nawaz Khan. So finally, Mandi came into existence on 15 April 1948. Suraj Sen ruled over Mandi at time of Damdama Mahal of Mandi.

=== Before independence ===
The Chiefs of Mandi State are said to be the descendants of common ancestors of the Chandervanshi line of rajputs of the Sen dynasty of Bengal, who claim to be the descendants of Pandavas of Mahabharata times. According to the earlier accounts, Bahu Sen established an independent territory and was recognised as a Rana or local Chief. The Raja Ajber Sen, the nineteenth descendant from Bahu Sen, was considered an able and benevolent ruler. He founded the present Mandi around the 'Bhootnath Temple' in the early 16th century (1500 AD-1534 AD) and shifted his capital to this place from Purani Mandi. The temple of Trilokinath was also constructed during his reign. He was succeeded by Chhattar Sen, who built a fort in Kalar by name Lakargarh. The successive rulers of Mandi were Shyam Sen, Gaur Sen, Sidh Sen, Shamsher Sen, Surma Sen, Ishwari Sen, Jalam Sen, Balbir Sen and Vijay Sen. Many public utilities, services and facilities like schools, hospitals and post offices, etc., were started by Raja Vijay Sen during his time. He also built a large number of palaces and houses. A mule road from Baijnath in District Kangra to Sultanpur in adjoining District of Kullu, via Mandi and the Victoria suspension Bridge on river Beas were constructed during his time in the year 1877. Raja Vijay Sen was issueless and left no direct heir. So in 1897, Bhawani Sen was recognised as his successor. During his period the town was considerably damaged in the earthquake of 1905. He was succeeded by Joginder Sen in April 1914 who was, however, vested with full powers of ruling chief in February 1925. During the period of his minority, Mandi remained under the management of a British officer, and a number of departments were overhauled and reorganised. Mandi being one of the oldest towns is enjoying urban status since 1901. The Mandi palace popularly known as "Raj Mahal" as it looked in the past. The area where the "Sunken Garden" exists today was once a pond. Mandi is also known as MINI PARIS, due to the wide market of clothes and fashionable people.

=== Predecessors and short history ===
The predecessor state of Siokot was founded in 1527. Formerly part of the Kingdom of Suket in the Punjab Hills, the dynasty traditionally goes back to 765 AD. In about 1100, Vijaya Sen had two sons, Sahu Sen who ruled over Suket and Bahu Sen who ruled over Kullu. Bahu Sen's descendants emigrated to Kullu until the tenth descendant, Kabakha Sen was killed by the Raja of Kullu and his son had to flee to Siokot, not very far from the present town of Mandi which was founded during Ajbar Sen's rule. Since 1986, HH Raja Ashokpal has been the ruler.

=== After independence ===
Mandi District was formed by amalgamation of the erstwhile princely states of Mandi and Suket on the formation of Himachal Pradesh on 15 April 1948. Since then, it is serving as the district headquarters of the Mandi District. Mandi district comprises 8 Tehsils namely Joginder Nagar, Sarkaghat, Sundar Nagar, Sadar Mandi, Chachyot, Thunag, Karsog, Balh and 9 Sub-Tehsils, i.e., Ladbharol, Padher, Sandhole, Dharmpur, Makreri, Baldwara, Nihri, Kotli, Aut, Bali Chowki.

Area Covered by Mandi District

For the purpose of development activities, the District has been divided into 10 Blocks. The District has a total population of 9,00,987 persons as per 2001 Census and area of 3,950 km^{2}. and covers 7.10% area of the State. The District has six towns including Pandoh as census town. These are namely Mandi, Sunder Nagar, Joginder Nagar, Rewalsar, Sarkaghat and Pandoh. Recently Mandi has become Zonal Headquarters of Central Zone, which covers the Districts of Bilaspur, Hamirpur, Kullu and Mandi itself and has gained much importance from administrative point of view.

=== Municipal Council ===
Nagar Parishad Mandi was constituted during 1950. It has 13 wards consisting of 10 Revenue hadbasts. In 2020, it has now become a Municipal Corporation with 15 wards presently having population of 41375 with 14626 households.

== Geography ==
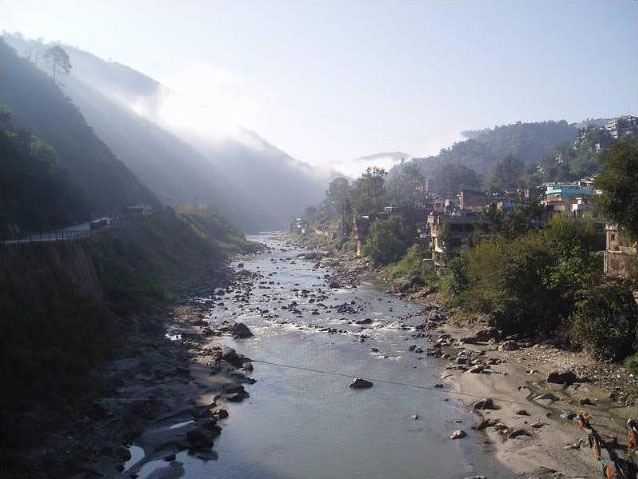
The River Beas where it runs through Mandi, Himachal Pradesh(Photo Taken in 2004)

Mandi is built on the banks of the Beas River, at the confluence of the Suketi Khad stream. Sikandar Dhar, Ghugar Dhar and Dhar Kot are some of the prominent hills and mountains found near the town. Mandi is located in 31°72'N latitude and 76°92'E longitude. It has an average elevation of 764 metres (2,507 feet). It lies on the Midlands of the Himalayan range. There is great variation in the climatic conditions of Himachal due to extreme variation in elevation. The climate varies from hot and sub-humid tropical in the southern tracts to cold, alpine and glacial in the northern and eastern mountain ranges with more elevation.

=== Geology ===
Mandi is a bowl-shaped table land on the banks of river Beas, surrounded by the high hill ranges of Gandharv Hills, Motipur Dhar, Rehra Dhar and Tarna Hill. Two small rivulets, Suketi Khad and Skodhi Khad join River Beas. Besides, the table land on the banks of river/streams, terrain is steep and hilly. Geologically, the town is located in seismic Zone No. IV near a fault line and is prone to earthquakes. As National Highway-20 Pathankot-Mandi, National Highway-21 Chandigarh-Mandi-Manali, National Highway-70 Hoshiarpur-Sarkaghat -Mandi and State Highway-32 Hoshiarpur-Mandi passes through the town, it is well connected with Jogindernagar, Palampur, Pathankot, Kullu, Sunder Nagar, Bilaspur, Chandigarh, Rewalsar, Sarkaghat and Una. Though Mandi is an old and fast developing town, yet it still retains its original charm and character.

=== Climate ===
Mandi falls in the lowermost climatic zone of the Himalayas, and features a monsoon-influenced humid subtropical climate (Köppen Cwa), characterised by hot summers and pleasant winters with chilly mornings. These regions enjoys a wet warm temperate climate in the foothills between 450 and 900 metres or 1,500 and 3,000 feet as against the dry cold alpine climate with snowfall at higher altitudes of between 2,400 and 4,800 metres or 7,900 and 15,700 feet. Temperatures typically range from 6.7 to 39.6 °C (44.1 to 103.3 °F) over the course of a year. The average temperature during summer is between 18.9 and 39.6 °C (66.0 and 103.3 °F), and between 6.7 and 26.2 °C (44.1 and 79.2 °F) in winter. Monthly precipitation varies between 15 millimetres (0.59 in) in November to 515 millimetres (20.3 in) in July. It is typically around 58.3 millimetres (2.30 in) per month during winter and spring and around 165 millimetres (6.5 in) in June as the monsoon approaches. The average total annual precipitation is 1,685 millimetres (66.3 in).

Climate data for Mandi (1991–2020)
Month	Jan	Feb	Mar	Apr	May	Jun	Jul	Aug	Sep	Oct	Nov	Dec	Year
Record high °C (°F)	27.7 (81.9)	31.3 (88.3)	39.0 (102.2)	39.5 (103.1)	42.2 (108.0)	42.7 (108.9)	40.0 (104.0)	37.3 (99.1)	35.9 (96.6)	33.7 (92.7)	33.2 (91.8)	32.5 (90.5)	42.7 (108.9)
Mean daily maximum °C (°F)	20.6 (69.1)	22.1 (71.8)	27.8 (82.0)	32.4 (90.3)	33.1 (91.6)	33.8 (92.8)	31.5 (88.7)	30.8 (87.4)	29.9 (85.8)	29.2 (84.6)	24.9 (76.8)	21.8 (71.2)	28.3 (82.9)
Mean daily minimum °C (°F)	4.3 (39.7)	6.3 (43.3)	11.1 (52.0)	14.8 (58.6)	18.0 (64.4)	20.4 (68.7)	21.3 (70.3)	20.2 (68.4)	18.8 (65.8)	14.4 (57.9)	8.5 (47.3)	5.2 (41.4)	13.9 (57.0)
Record low °C (°F)	−2.7 (27.1)	−2.0 (28.4)	0.0 (32.0)	4.3 (39.7)	5.4 (41.7)	7.5 (45.5)	12.0 (53.6)	11.4 (52.5)	9.7 (49.5)	4.3 (39.7)	1.0 (33.8)	−2.9 (26.8)	−2.9 (26.8)
Average rainfall mm (inches)	42.9 (1.69)	61.5 (2.42)	72.0 (2.83)	45.1 (1.78)	38.1 (1.50)	146.4 (5.76)	235.7 (9.28)	292.7 (11.52)	127.5 (5.02)	13.1 (0.52)	5.1 (0.20)	18.1 (0.71)	1,098.2 (43.24)
Average rainy days	3.2	4.0	4.6	3.3	2.8	8.6	12.8	11.5	6.5	1.2	0.5	1.2	60.2
Average relative humidity (%) (at 17:30 IST)	66	59	50	54	54	63	75	78	74	69	68	71	65
Source 1: India Meteorological Department
Source 2: International Scholarly Research Network

== Economy ==
The people of Mandi follow an agrarian economy and cultivate rice, pulses, millets, tea, sesame seed, groundnut, sunflower oil and herbal products. Himachal Pradesh Town and Planning Department works for Mandi Planning area (MPA). More than 9,000 farmers are directly involved in cocoon cultivation for producing Silk in lower hills of Mandi District. Mandi District is also facing tough competition from China, which is marketing raw silk at much lower rates in the market.

Many Hectares of land in Mandi is also under Apple production. Apples are generally planted during December every year. The area under fruit in Mandi is about 15 per cent of the total area under fruits in Himachal Pradesh. Mandi raw silk has acquired wide fame but the salt mines at Drang and Guma are the special features of the economy. With abundant deposit of salt and limestone, possibilities are being investigated for the existence of magnesite, coal and china-clay. Mandi also has fish markets where brown trout is one of the most demanded fish species. In Mandi, a farmer gets around Rs. 200 a kg for brown trout.

== Government and politics ==
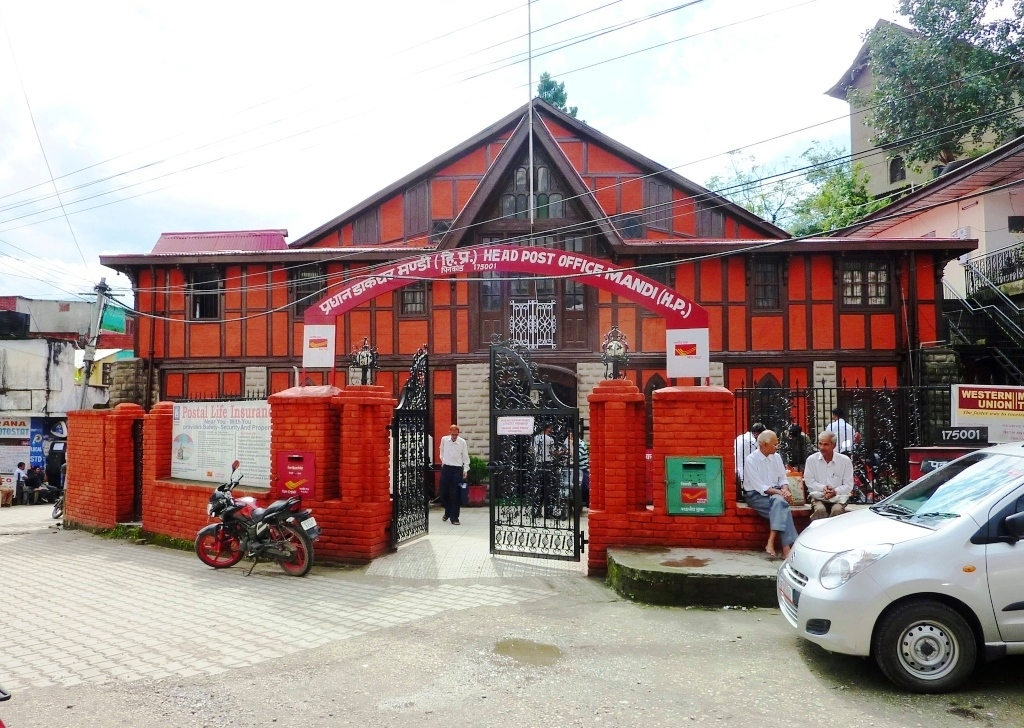
Head Post Office, Mandi

Established on 15 April 1948, the Mandi municipal council is the oldest elected body nominated by the government of Himachal Pradesh. Municipal Council of Mandi was constituted during 1950. It has 13 wards consisting of 10 Revenue Hadbasts. As of the 2017 general election, the two major political parties are the Bharatiya Janata Party (BJP) (in power) and the Indian National Congress (INC) (in opposition). The administrative head of the council is the Municipal commissioner who is appointed by the state government.

Mandi contributes one seat to the lower house of parliament (Lok Sabha). Law and order in the town is collectively maintained by the police department, vigilance department, enforcement directorate, forensics, fire department, department of prisons, and home guard department. The Superintendent of Police of Mandi, Shalini Agnihotri, heads the police department. The Deputy Commissioner of Mandi, Arindam Chaudhary, is the head of District. There is one district court in the town including other courts in other towns of the district.

== Transport ==
Mandi National Highways Road Network

Local transport in Mandi is generally by auto-rickshaw, bus or private vehicles. Tourist taxis are also an option. The taxi station is located right in front of Seri Stage. Auto-rickshaws are the main means of transport in Mandi and are available almost 24 hours.

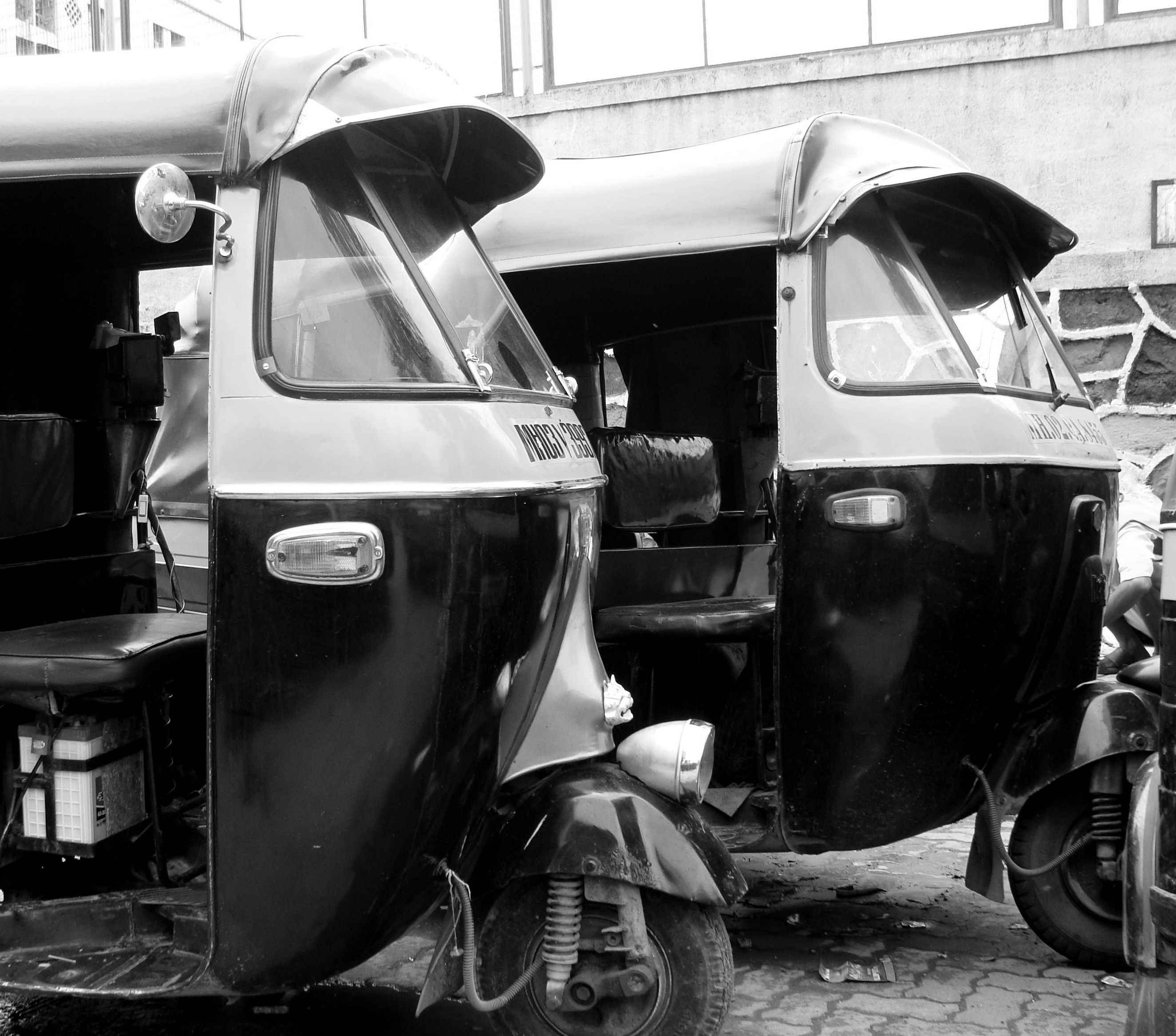
AutoRickshaw are the main source of tourist transportation in Mandi

The nearest airport to Mandi is the Bhuntar Airport, about 75 km from Mandi. It is connected to Pathankot through National Highway 20 which is almost 220 km (140 mi) long and to Manali and Chandigarh through National Highway 21 which is 323 km (201 mi) long.

Munish Resorts, Visco Resorts and Regent Palms Hotel are hotels and resorts in Mandi. Some other hotels are Raj Mahal, Amar Atithi, Ashoka Holiday Inn, Hotel Evening Plaza, Mandav Hotel (HPTDC), Surbhi Hotel, Hotel Yamini. Most people come to Mandi through Delhi or Chandigarh.

From Delhi The distance between Delhi and Mandi is about 475 km. This distance can be covered in approximately 12 hrs by bus.

The alternative to reach Mandi from Delhi is to travel by train up to Kiratpur Sahib by Delhi-Una Himachal express (4553). From Kiratpur, there is a bus. All the buses going from Delhi and Chandigarh to Mandi have to pass through Kiratpur. Mandi will be a station on the under-construction Bhanupli–Leh line.

Also, you can take NH 1 to Ambala and NH 22 to Chandigarh before taking NH 21 to Mandi.

From Chandigarh From Chandigarh there are buses to Mandi and Manali. The buses from Delhi pass through Chandigarh and some buses start from Chandigarh itself. The distance between Chandigarh and Mandi is 200 km. This distance can be covered in approximately 6 hrs by bus. By taxi, it may take around 5 hrs.

By Air The nearest airport to Mandi is the Kullu Airport at Bhuntar, about 75 km from Mandi. This is a small domestic airport; only small aircraft fly to Kullu. Flights to Kullu are restricted only from Delhi, and Shimla. From Delhi, flights to Kullu take about 90 minutes by Indian Airlines or Kingfisher Airlines.

By Rail There is currently no railway, but one is proposed. There is a proposal to extend the Kangra Valley Railway to Mandi, and connect it to a new Bhanupli–Leh line. The nearest railway station currently is the Jogindernagar Railway Station almost 50 km from the Mandi; this is the current terminus of the Kangra Valley Railway.

== Demographics ==
As of 2001 India census, Mandi had a population of 26,858. Males constitute 53% of the population and females 47%. Mandi has an average literacy rate of 83.5%, higher than the national average of 65.38% & almost equal to state's literacy rate(83.57%): male literacy is 92%, and female literacy is 75%. In Mandi, 11% of the population is under 6 years of age. Mandi had a very high sex ratio – 1013 girls for every 1000 boys in 2011. Mandi has a mixed population of Hindus, Muslims, Sikhs, Buddhists and Christians with more than 90% population being Hindu. According to census 2011, the town has a population of 26,422.

== Culture ==
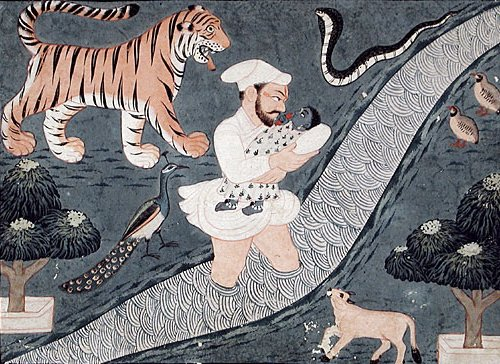
Paintings(mid-18th century) of Mandi showing Vasudeva Carrying Krishna over the Yamuna River.

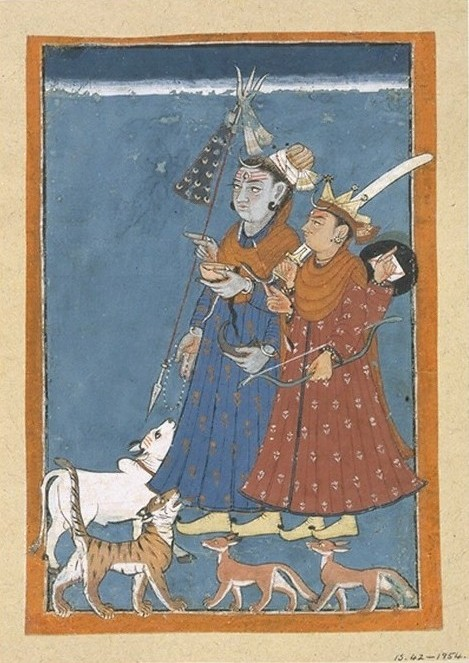
Painting(1740–1770) showing Shiva and Devi.

Mandi is the cultural capital of Himachal Pradesh. The people of Mandi are informally called Mandyalis. Mandeali language is generally used at local level for communication. Sepu Wadi is the official and main cuisine of Mandi. Dham (Lunch) is generally organised in local marriages, functions and parties. Himachal Darshan Photo Gallery is situated at about 4 km from Mandi near Sauli Khad on the Chandigarh-Manali National highway. This art gallery contains a collection of photographs of exotic locations of the entire state and reflects the social & cultural heritage of the people of Himachal Pradesh. District Library is located in Emerson House (District Court). Clothing in Mandi was Kurta-Pyjama for Boys and Sari-Suits for girls but with the Western Culture arriving to India, Mandi's youth have started wearing Western styles. However, there are still large numbers of people who wear the traditional clothing of Himachal Pradesh. Banthra is the main folk dance performed in theatrical shows in Mandi and is the official folk dance of the District.

The Mandi Shivaratri Fair is an international fair held in Mandi for seven days in the month of February/March every year. The celebration of Shivratri of Mandi is said to have started in the year 1526 to commemorate the foundation of present-day Mandi. Before this, the capital of Mandi was on the right bank of the river Beas, which is now known as Old Mandi (Purani Mandi). Mandi hosts a half marathon every year. As of 2026, a special Shivratri fair will be held to commemorate 500 years of the city's founding.

Once when the tenth guru of the Sikhs was on a visit to Mandi, the king of Mandi invited him to stay at the royal palace. The guru accepted the invitation to stay in Mandi but not with the king. He put up outside the town in a secluded place, which had once been the hermitage of a rishi (Indian sage). The guru was touched by the king's devotion and prophesied that Mandi would ever remain safe and if any enemy tries to harm it, bolts from heaven would crush the invader. He considered Mandi the safest place on the planet. V.G.C. mandi hp Youth festival group 4 (one act play, skit, mime and mimicry)

== Education ==
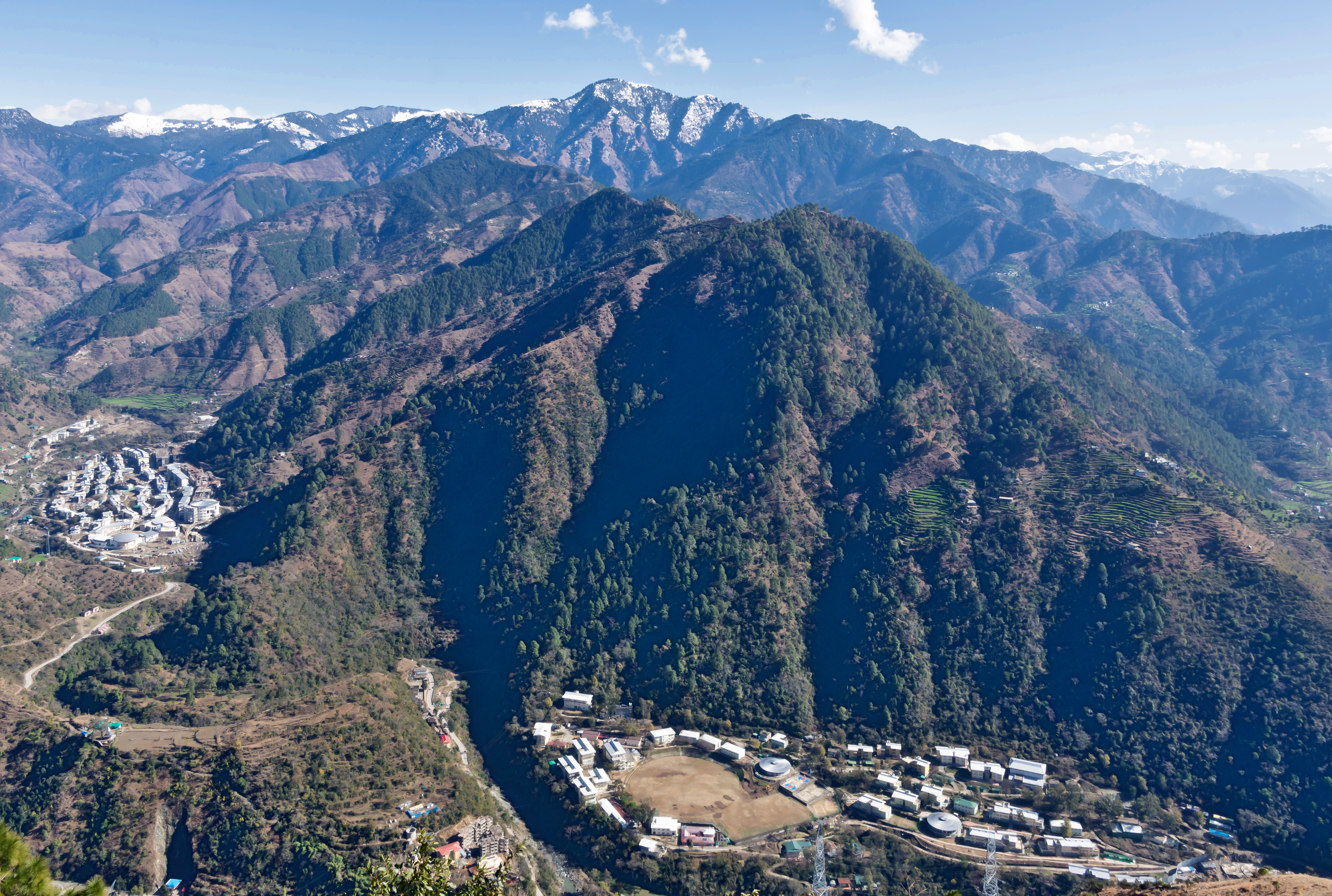
View of IIT Mandi campus from Griffon Peak, Jan 2020. South Campus in front right, North Campus in left middle.

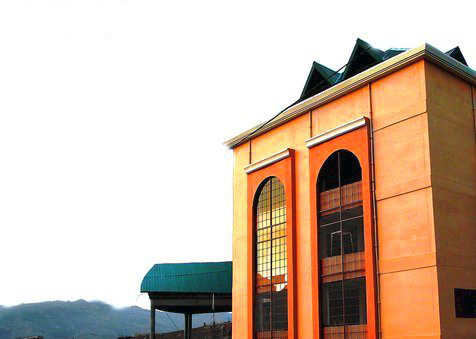
Jawaharlal Nehru Engineering College

Mandi has anganwadis, primary schools as well as high schools. Some of the schools in the town include DAV Centenary Public School, Kendriya Vidyalaya, Mandi Public School, Indus Global School, The Phoenix School of Integrated Learning, Vijay Government Senior Secondary School, Government Senior Secondary School (Girls), Sarswati Vidya Mandir nagwain., Sai Public School, St. Xavier Residential School, DAV Sr. Secondary School, Anglo Sanskrit Model School. The medical institutes in Mandi are Himachal Dental College. Shri Lal Bahadur Shastri Government Medical College. Jawaharlal Nehru Government Engineering College, T. R. Abhilashi Memorial Institute of Engineering and Technology, and Vallabh Bhai Government College are also located in Mandi. The Indian Institute of Technology Mandi, is an autonomous and top university of the state for Graduation in BTech/MTech offering many courses.

== Media ==
Mandi has numerous newspaper publications distributed here, television and radio stations. The top Hindi language newspapers are Amar Ujala, Punjab Kesari, Dainik Bhaskar, Dainik Jagran, Devbhumi Mirror, Divya Himachal, Himachal Dastak, Jansatta, Dainik Sawera and Uttam Hindu. Magazines include Outlook, Champak. English language newspapers sold in Mandi include the Times of India, The Hindu, Hindustan Times, Indian Express and The Tribune.

Numerous Indian and international television channels can be watched in Mandi through the local cable television provider. The national television broadcaster, Doordarshan, provides many channels like DD Shimla, DD National, DD Sports, DD Sports HD.

The wide range of cable channels available includes news channels such as Aaj Tak, Lokmat IBN, Zee News, Star News, NDTV 24X7, sports channels like Ten Sports, ESPN, Star Sports, Neo Sports, Neo Cricket, National entertainment channels like Colors, Sony, Zee TV and STAR Plus. Other News channels include Pole Star Himachal, S-TV, Wireless Communication System & GMC NETWORK NER CHOWK. Satellite television (DTH) are very rarely used. Prominent DTH entertainment services in Mandi include Dish TV, TATA Sky, Videocon TV, Reliance Big TV. There are two radio stations in Mandi. People generally use CRT, LCD, LED Televisions.

== Sports ==
Mandi is home to Bandy Federation of India which is a member of the IOC recognised Federation of International Bandy. Bandy Federation of India is Headquartered in Mandi. India has a bandy team. Bandy Federation of India takes care of Bandy in India. India is one of 7 countries in Asia and in total 29 to be a member of Federation of International Bandy.

Cricket and football are one of the most popular sports played in the town. Shaheed Krishan Chand Memorial Stadium in Mandi helds List A cricket matches. It is also known as Paddal ground. It has also held All India Ranji Matches. Badminton courts are made in Town Hall as well as in Paddal. Open Swimming pool is also situated near Bhiuli. There are many Snooker Pools and Table Tennis halls in town at different places. Rishi Dhawan is a cricketer from Mandi who played for Kings XI Punjab in Indian Premier League. He has also represented the Indian National Team in 3 ODI's & 1 T20I.

Adventure tourism in Mandi has gained importance in the recent years due to its thick forest cover, picturesque hills and the splashing waters of the river Beas. Mandi offers an ideal location for all kinds of adventure sports. One such place for adventure Tourism in Mandi is Sunder Nagar, a small place at the edge of the valley. It is located at a height of over one thousand metres and has some of the tallest trees found in the state. The climate is colder and the tree cover makes this an ideal spot for adventure lovers to go on a nature trail. Many species of birds are seen and the walk through the trees is an amazing adventure, since walking through the dense forest and rappelling down the rocky cliff is very challenging.

Janjehli, located about two hours journey from Mandi, offers treks up to 3000 metres. As the entire road is not motorable, the last part of the journey has to be covered on foot through a thick forest. Another trek from Janjheli takes you through these forests to the temple of the Shikari Devi. This temple devoted to the goddess is said to have been built at the time of the Pandavas and is roofless.

The hydroelectric power station at Jogindernagar can be accessed via a trolley up the rocky cliff to a height of about 2500 metres. The trolley then drops down to the other side to Barot, where the reservoir is located.

== Places of worship ==
Temples Mandi has more than 300 old and new temples. Because of the large number of temples and its location along River Beas, Mandi is also known as 'Chhoti (Small) Kashi'. Most of the temples are dedicated to Lord Shiva and the Goddess Kali. There are many classical temples which the Archaeological Survey of India has declared 'protected monuments' due to their historical significance, the primary ones being: the 'Panchvaktra Temple', situated at the confluence of River Bea and Suketi Khad, 'Ardhnareshwar Temple', which is one of very few temples of its kind in India. 'Triloknath Temple' is located on the right bank of the Beas River. The Mata Kuan Rani Temple, consisting of a slate-roofed temple over a deep well which is dedicated to the 'Princess of the Well' and celebrates the time when, according to legend, Mandarava, the Princess of Sahor (Mandi), became a consort of Padmasambhava. The king became angry and condemned them both to death in a fire which raged for seven days. After the smoke cleared there was a lake with a lotus in it, 'Rewalsar' or Tso Pema (Tibetan: 'Lotus Lake').

Gurudwara Mandi has a historical Gurudwara in honour of Guru Gobind Singh, the 10th Sikh Guru, who spent some time in Mandi. The people and the ruler welcomed him with great warmth and supported the Guru in his war against the tyrannical rule of the Mughal Emperor Aurangzeb; it is said that the town has the Guru's blessings. The Gurdwara is also unofficially referred to as Gurudwara Palang Sahab, because the Guru's Bed 'Palang' is still preserved here.

Mosques There are two mosques in Mandi: one is in jail road and other is in Ramnagar (Mangwayi). There is also a mosque (Madina Mosque) near IIT Mandi North campus in Salgi village in Khanahr, 16 km from main Mandi town.

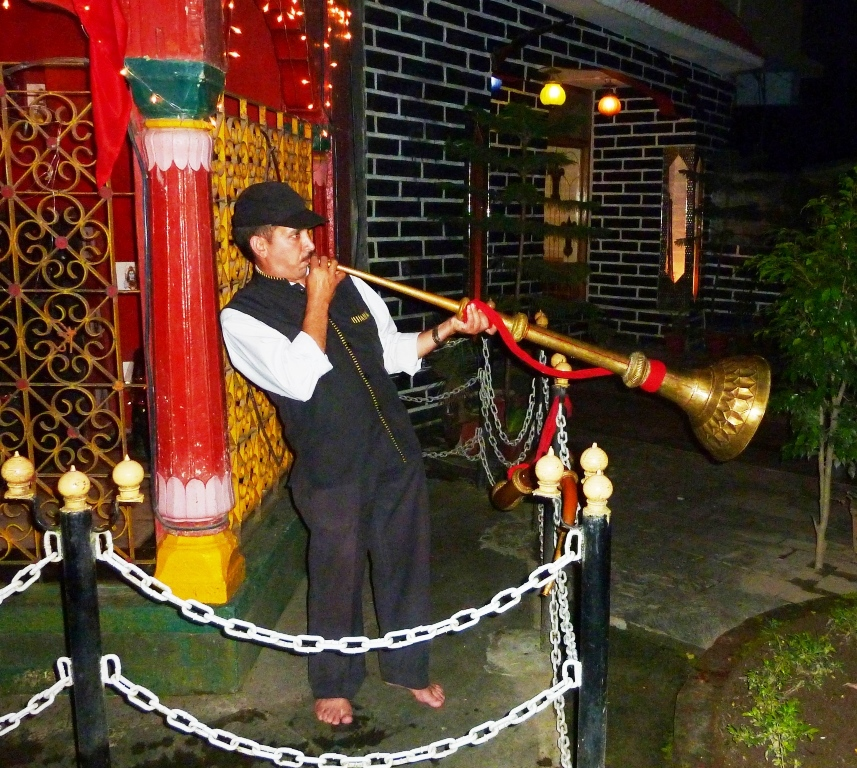
Palace Temple

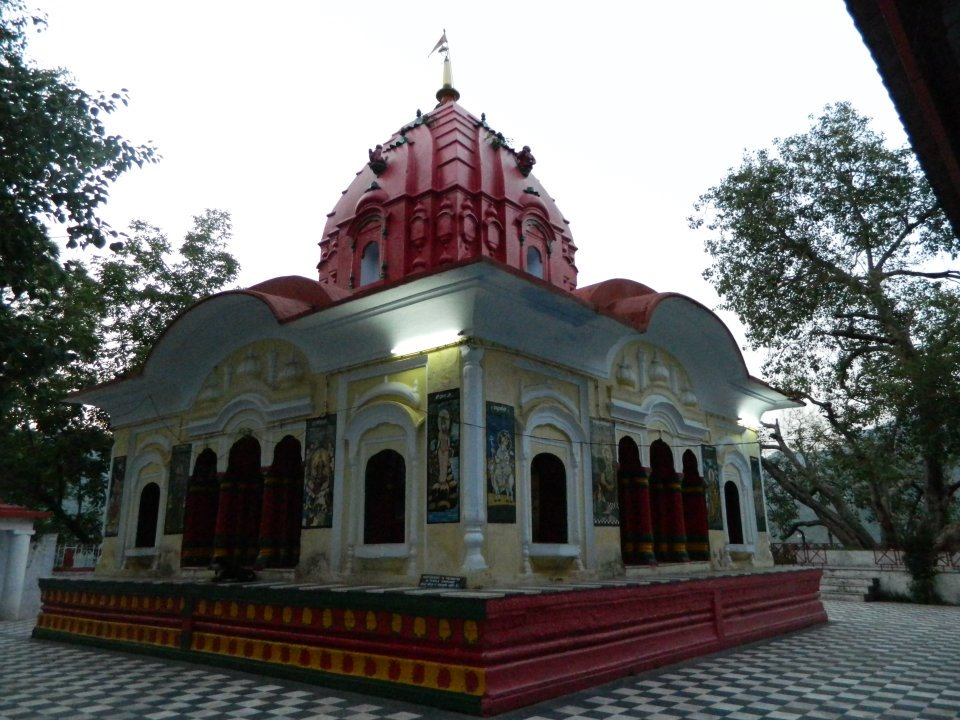
Tarna Temple

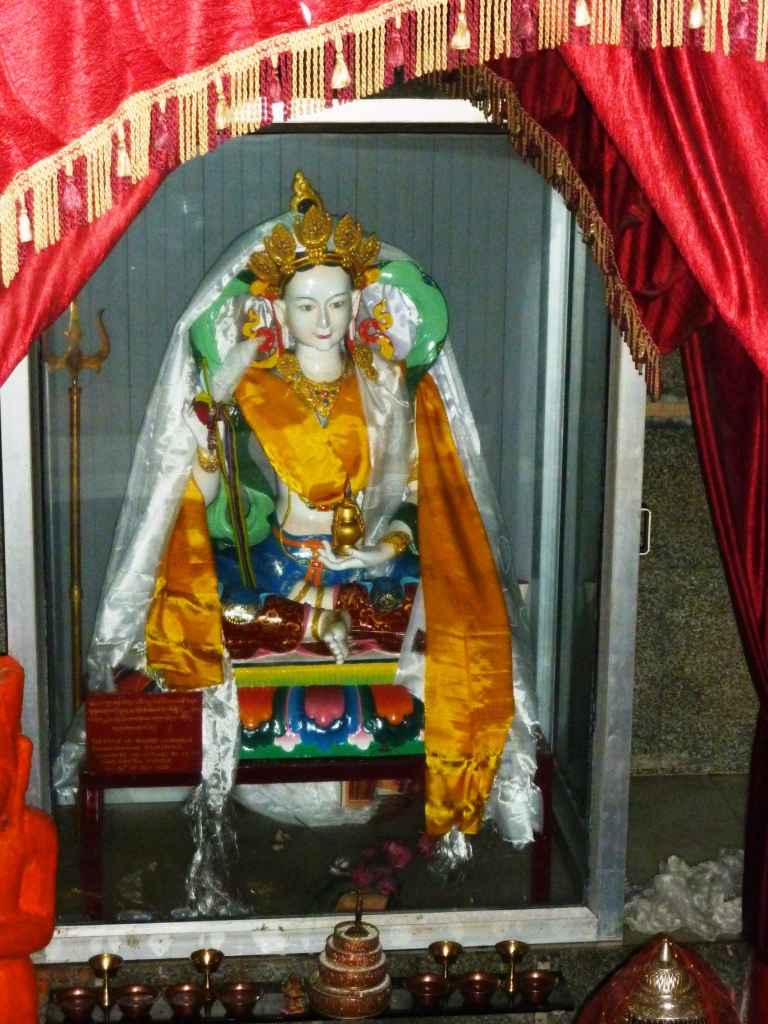
Princess Mandarava statue in Mata Kua Rani Temple

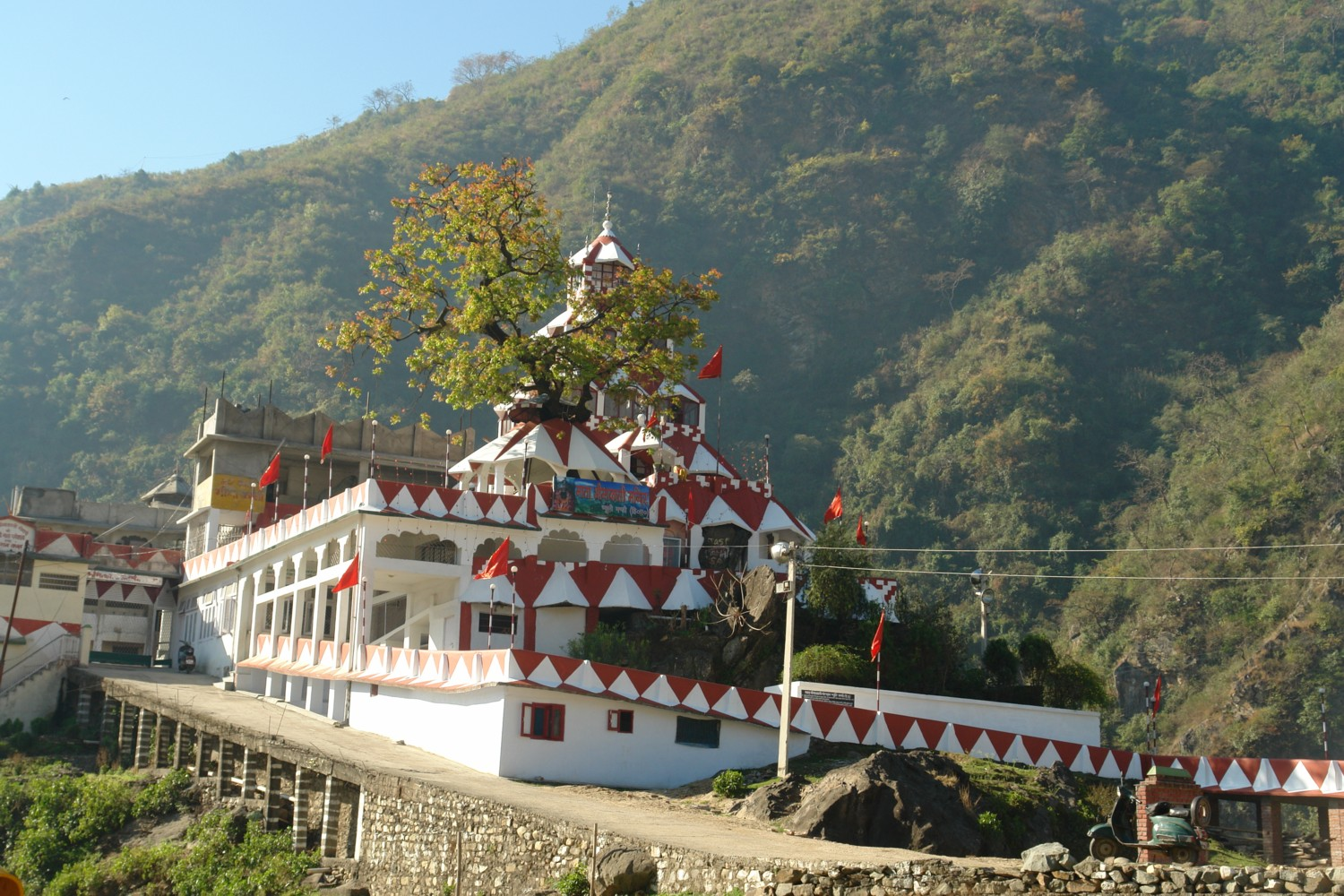
Bhimakali Temple

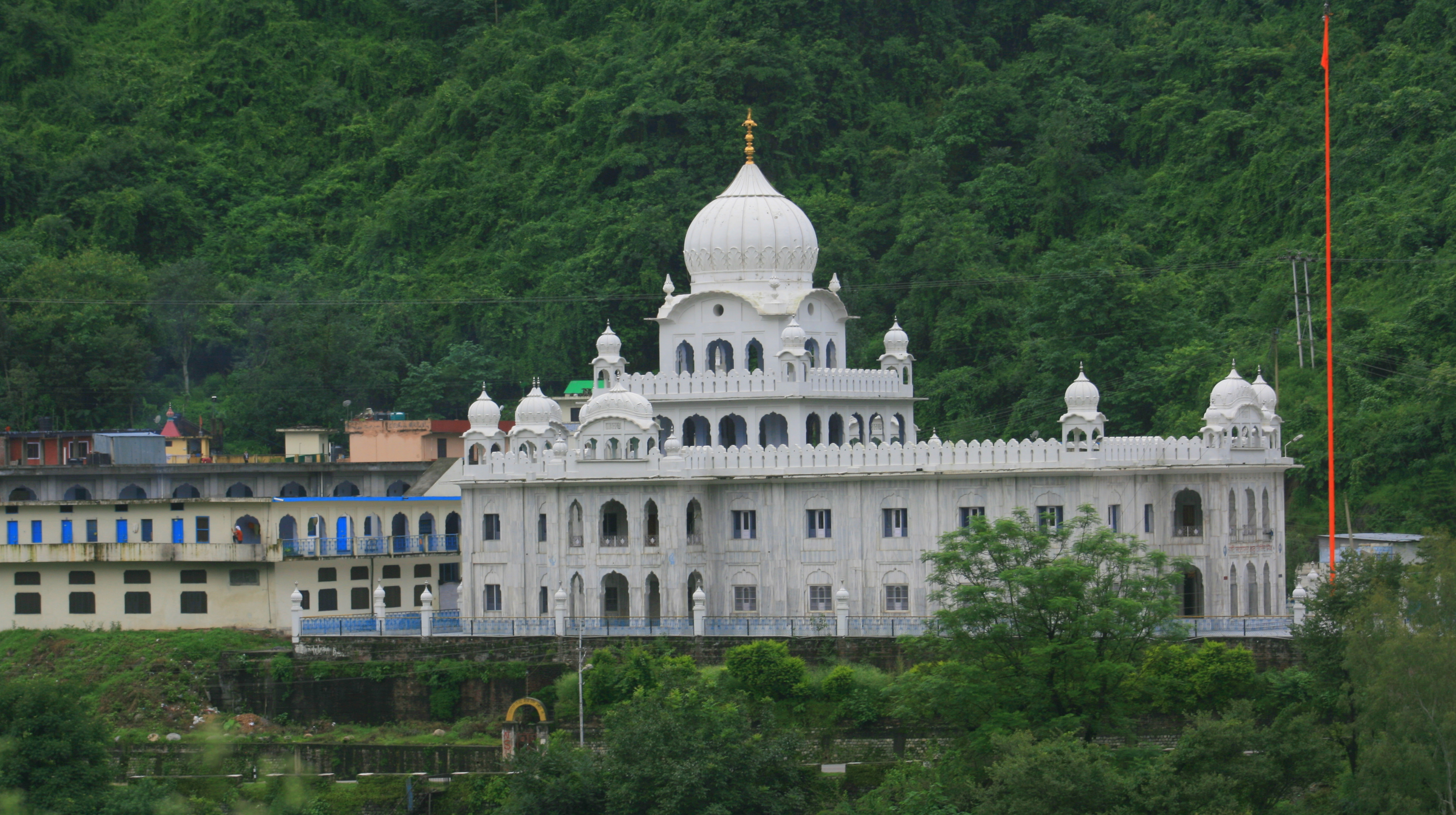
The Gurudwara at Mandi

== Hydroelectric projects and ecological damage ==
Commissioning of Pandoh dam in 1977 diverted 9000 cusecs of Beas river reducing the flow through Mandi thereby adversely affecting the flora and fauna. The once mighty and roaring Beas now has a deserted look in the winter. The flow in Beas was further reduced in 1982 when additional waters were diverted from Uhl river in Barot to Shanan Power House. The citizen council of Mandi filed a writ petition that Pandoh dam release an extra 20 per cent water to revitalise the river.

== Wildlife Sanctuaries ==
- Nargu Wildlife Sanctuary
- Shikari Devi Wildlife Sanctuary: This wildlife sanctuary is spread in an area of 29.94 square kilometres (km^{2}).
- Bandli Wildlife Sanctuary: Situated in Mandi district, Bandli Wildlife Sanctuary covers an area of 41.32 km^{2}., at altitudes from about 600 meters to over 2000 meters. It is around eight kilometres from Sundar Nagar. Its flora includes Dry Mixed Deciduous Forests, Himalayan Subtropical Chir Pine Forest and Himalayan Temperate Forest. Bandli Wildlife Sanctuary offers habitat to a variety of animals including, leopard, Barking deer, Goral, Jackal, Indian fox, Hanuman langur, Black bear, Indian porcupine, and Himalayan palm civet etc. Seventy (70) bird species, referable to nine orders and 32 families, are recorded in this wildlife sanctuary. Cheer pheasant, which is enlisted in the red list of International Union of Conservation of Nature (IUCN) is also found here.

== Notable residents ==
- Kangana Ranaut, Bollywood actress
- Jai Ram Thakur, former C.M. of Himachal Pradesh BJP
- Rishi Dhawan, an all-rounder from district Mandi Himachal Pradesh cricket team playing IPL 2023
- Yami Gautam, Bollywood actress

== See also ==
- Shaheed Krishan Chand Memorial Stadium
- TCV Suja
- IIT Mandi

=== Gallery ===
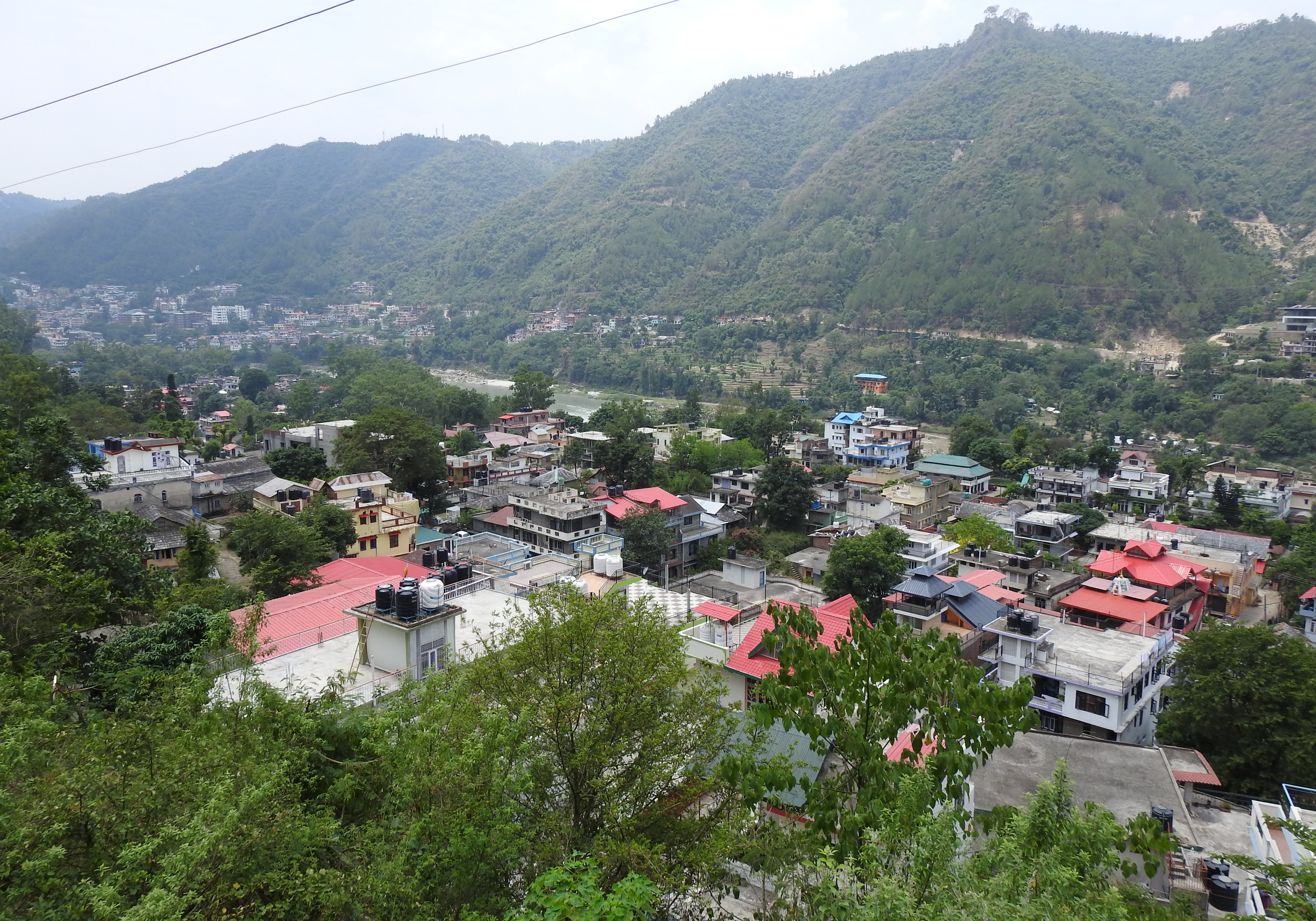
Mandi city

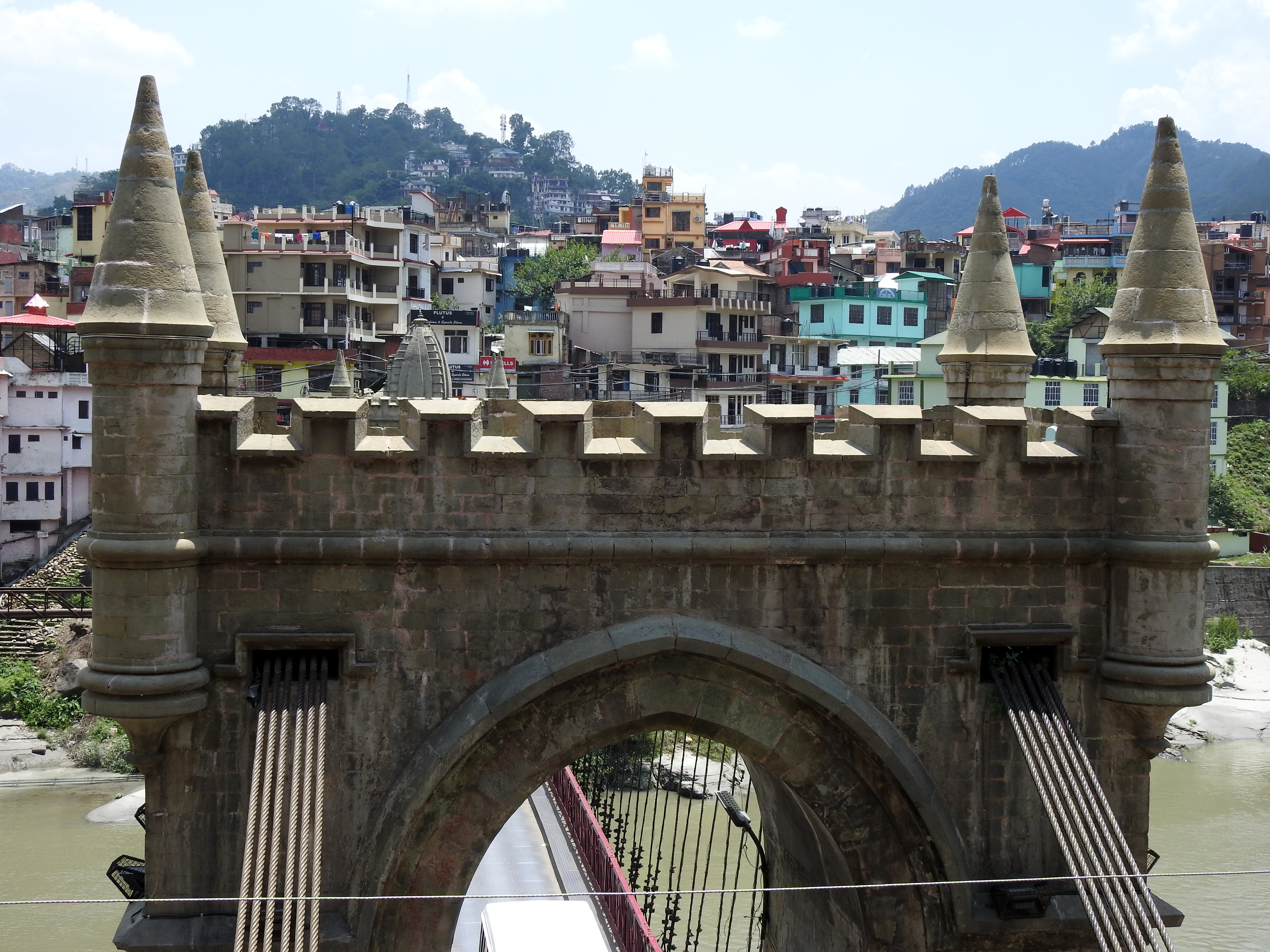
Victoria Bridge, Mandi closer view

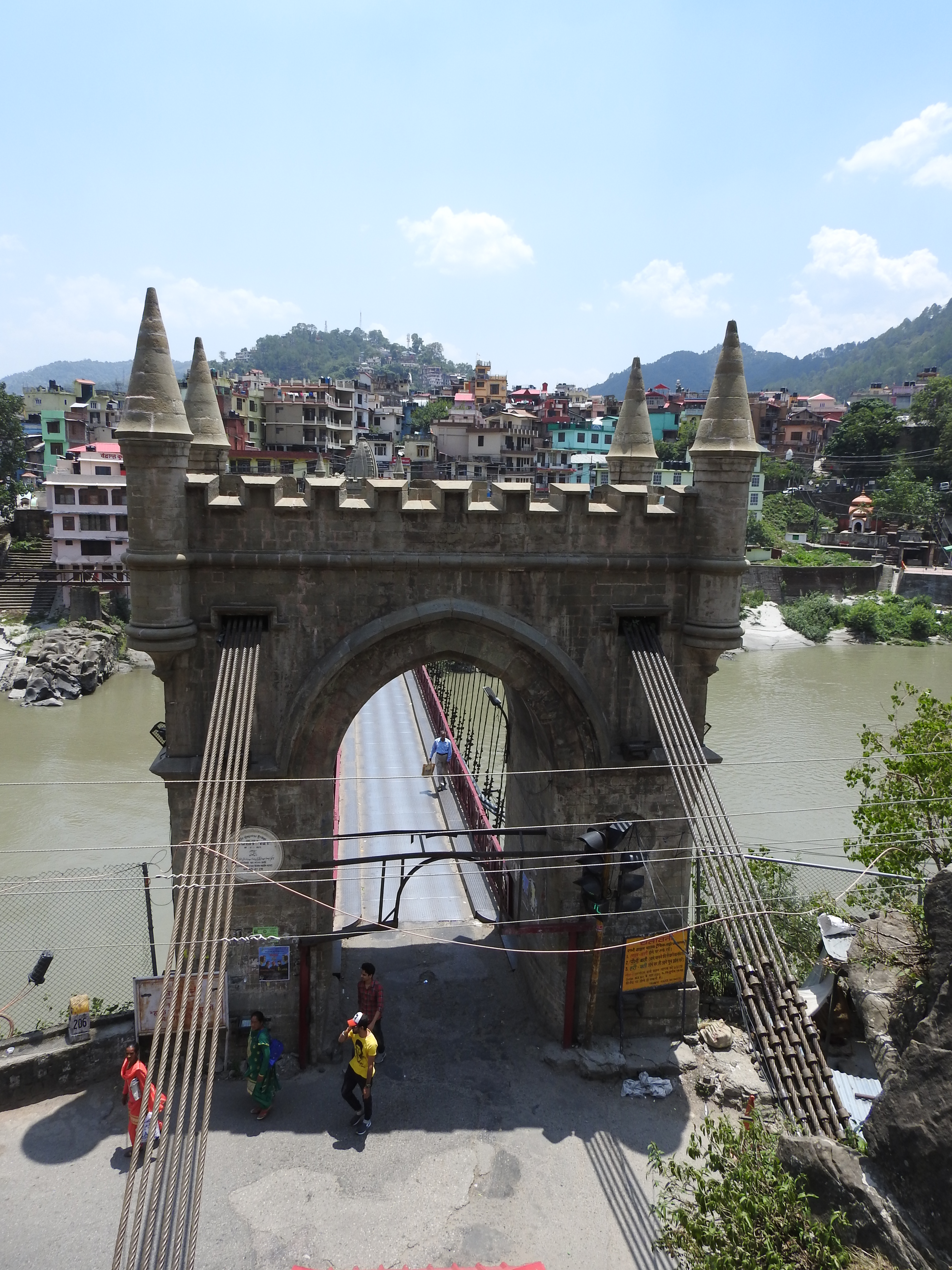
Victoria Bridge, Mandi full view

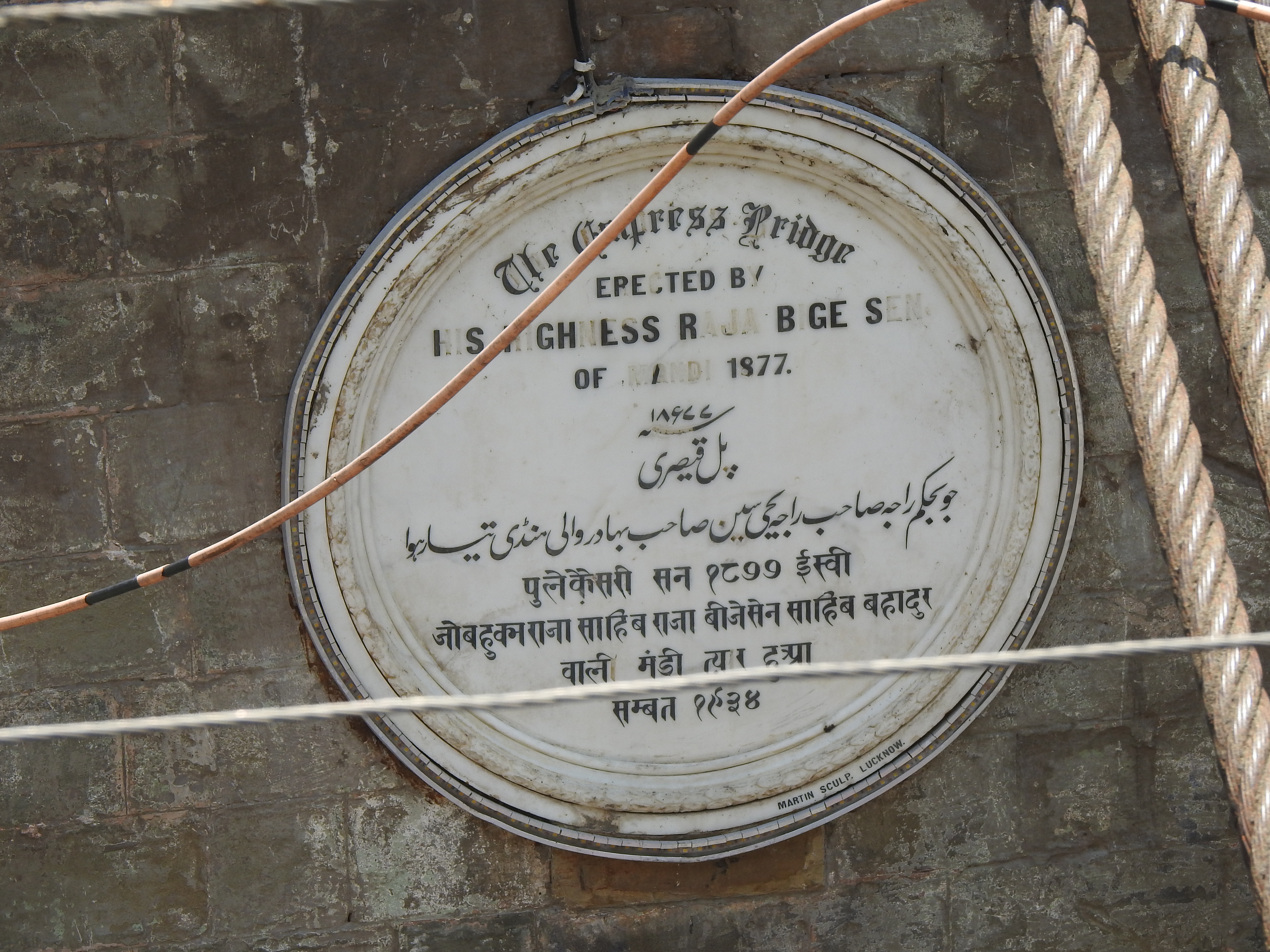
Victoria Bridge, Mandi, inscription board

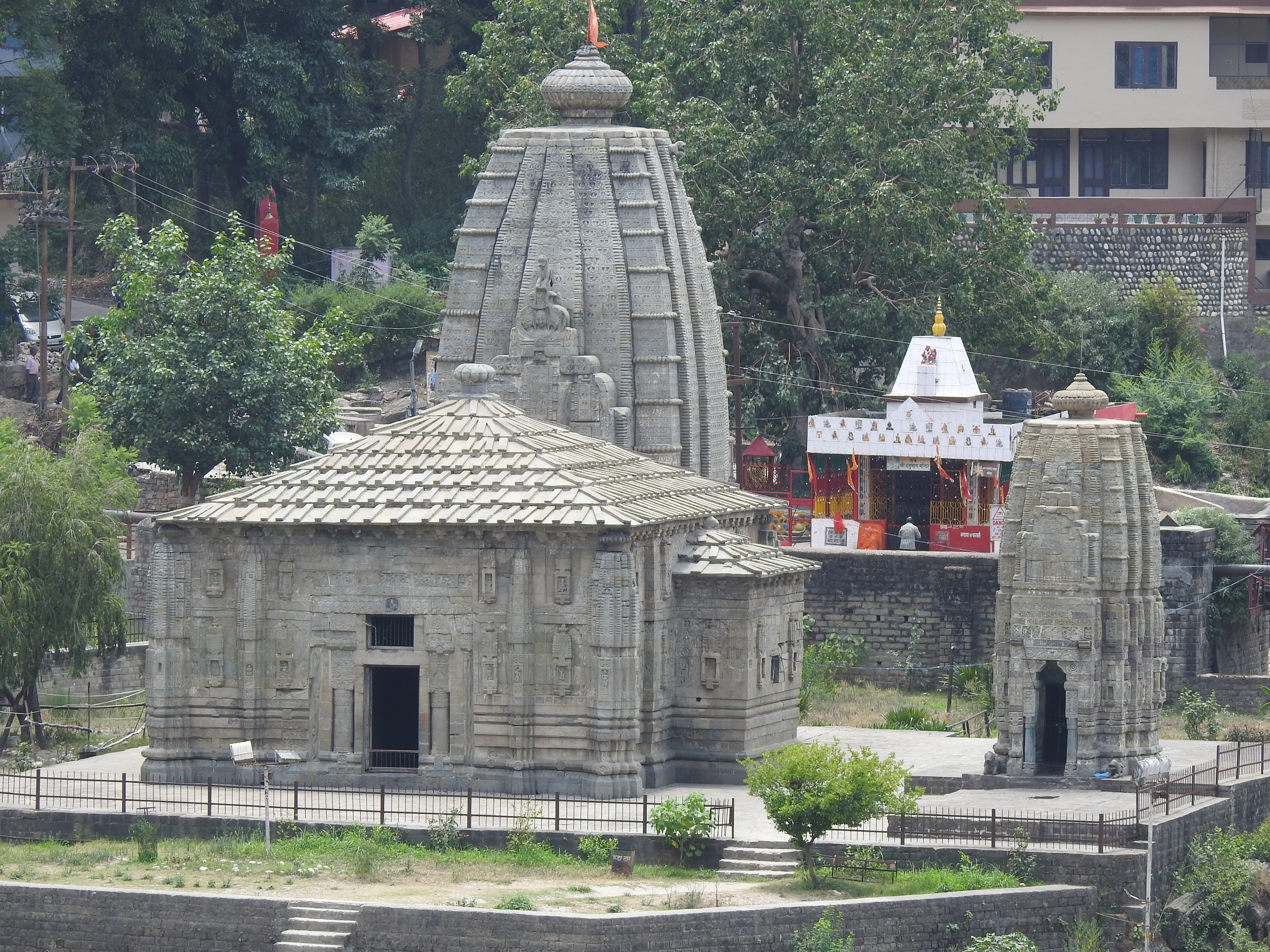
Triloknath Temple

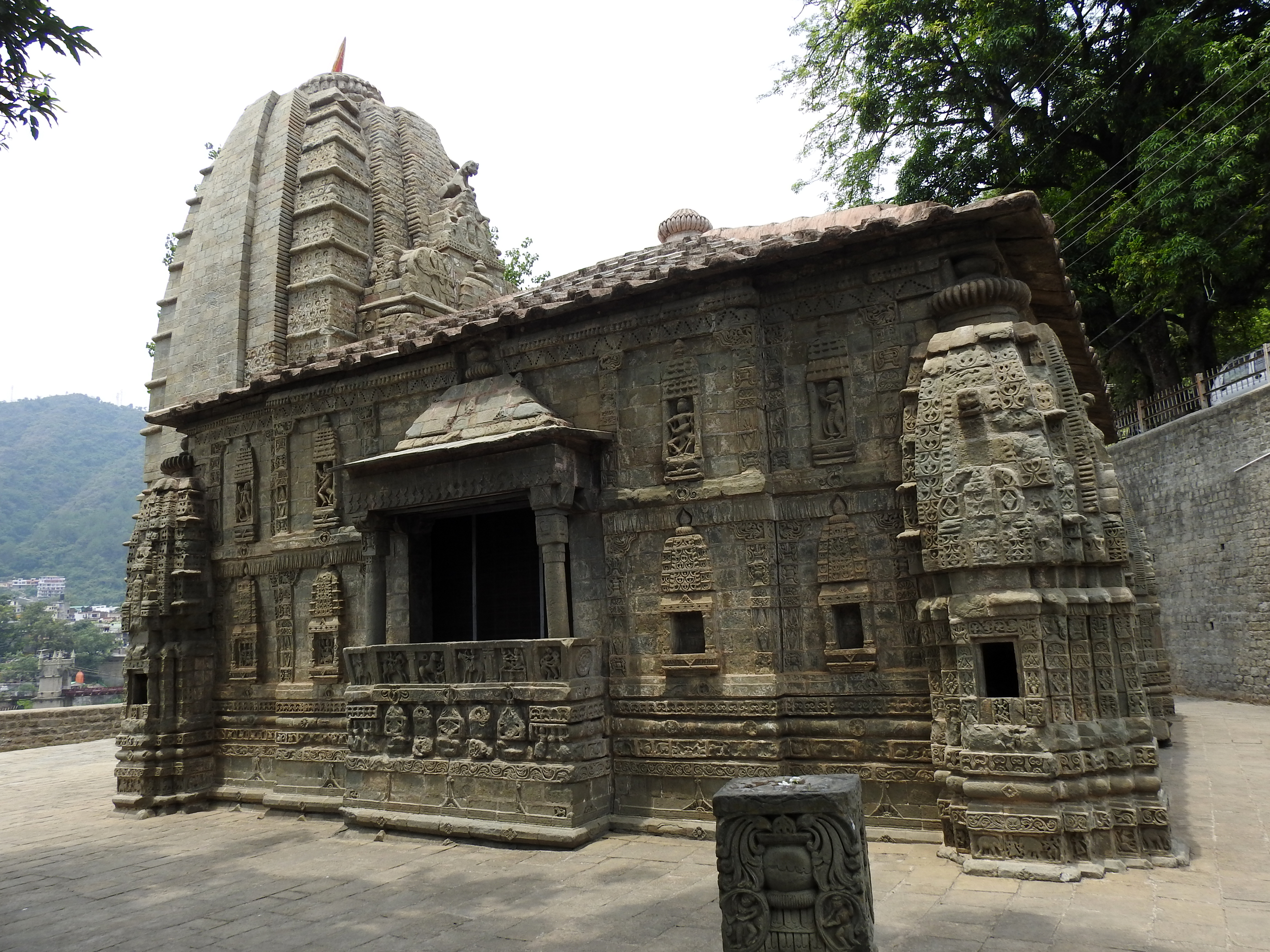
Triloknath Temple

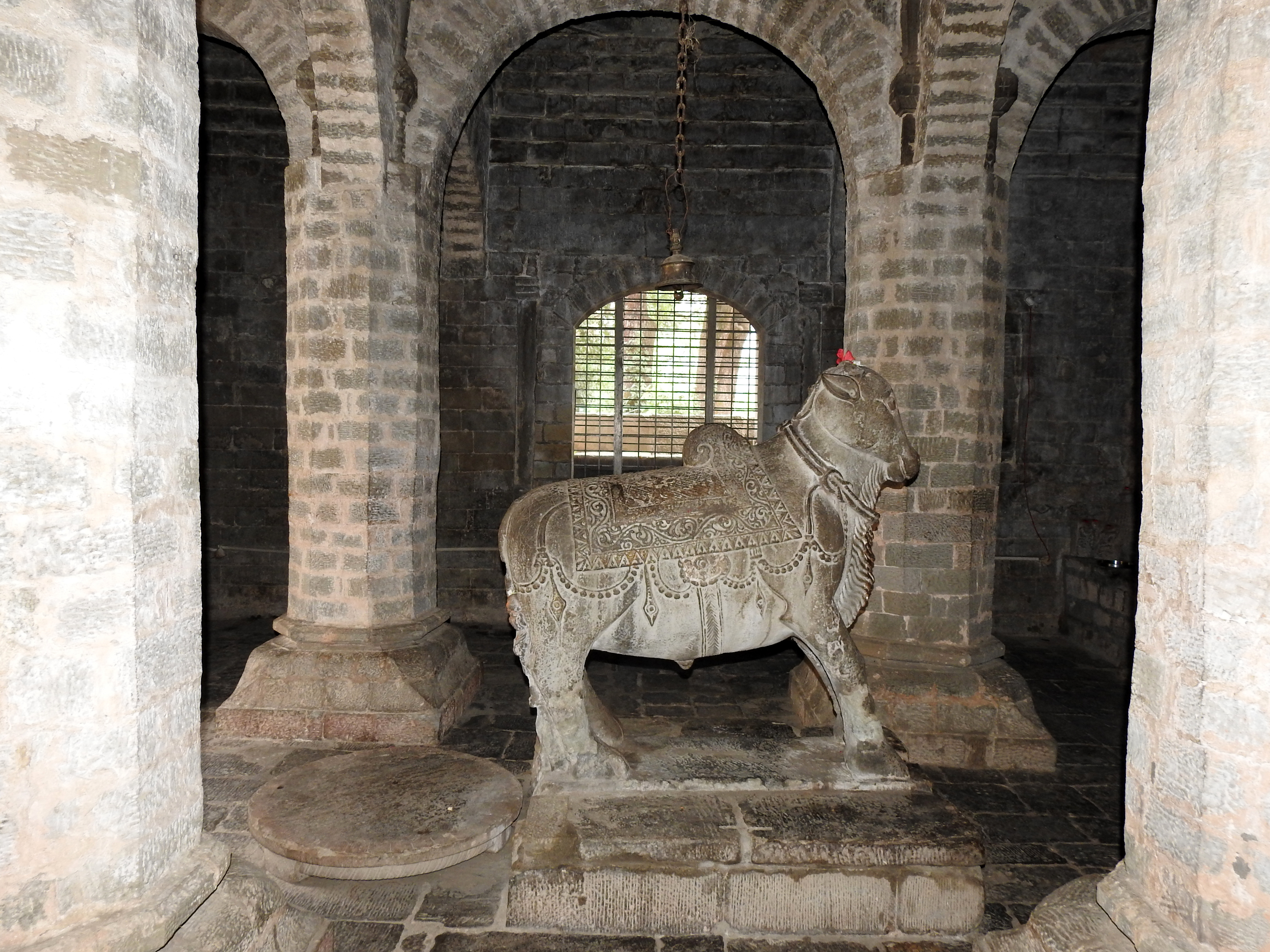
Triloknath Temple -inner view

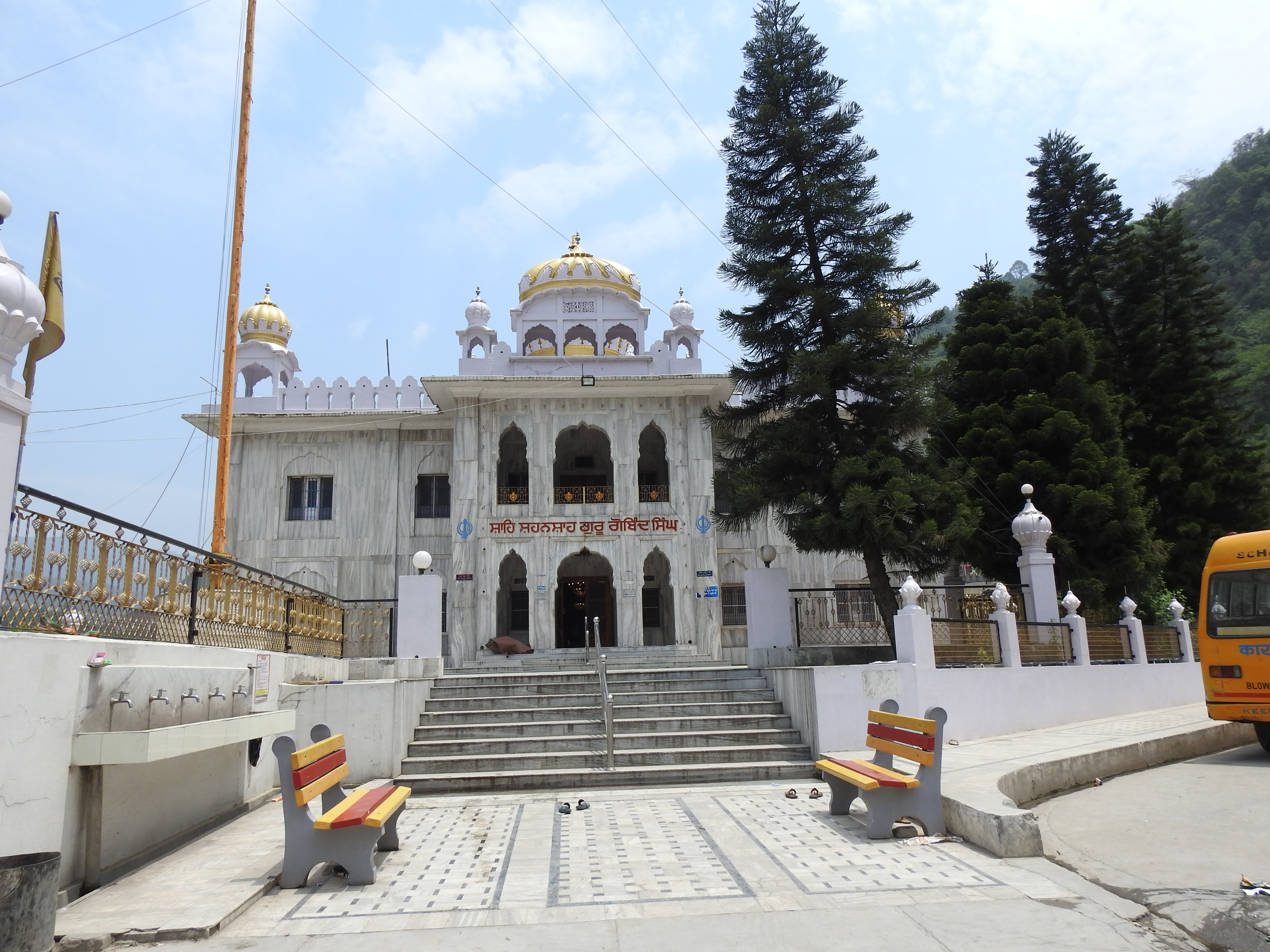
Gurudwara Palang Sahib

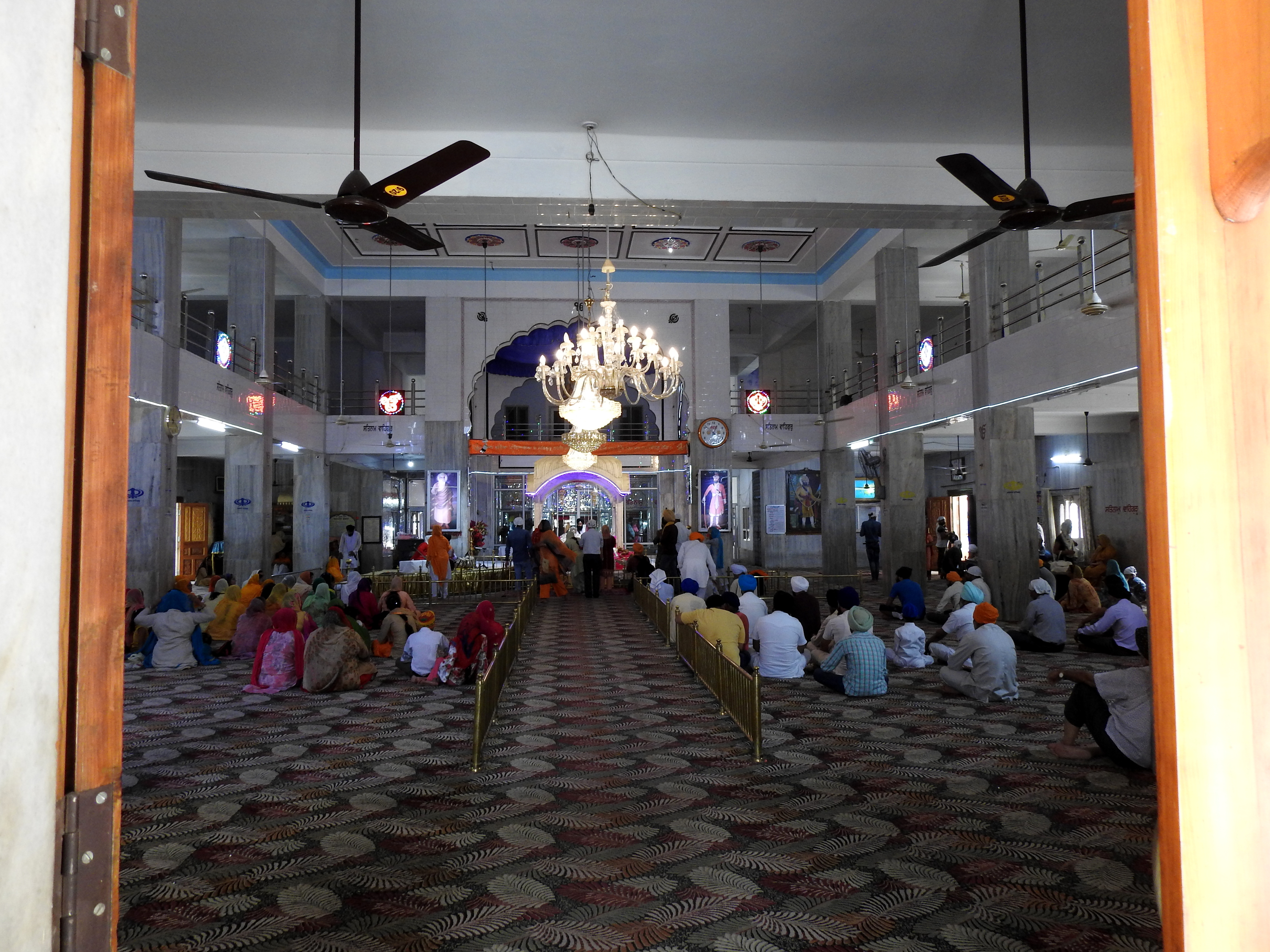
Gurudwara Palang -iner view

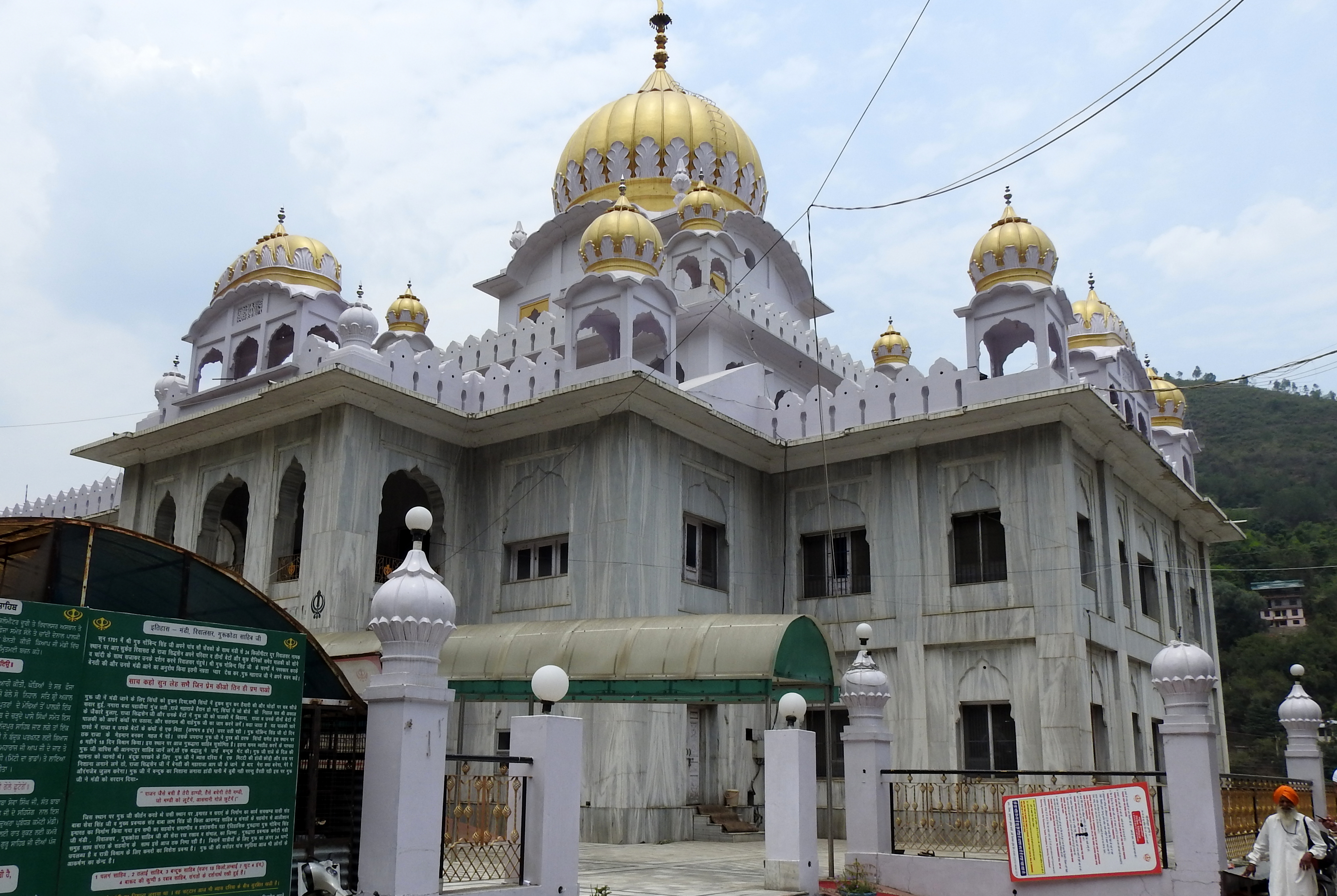
Gurudwara Palang Sahib-outer view

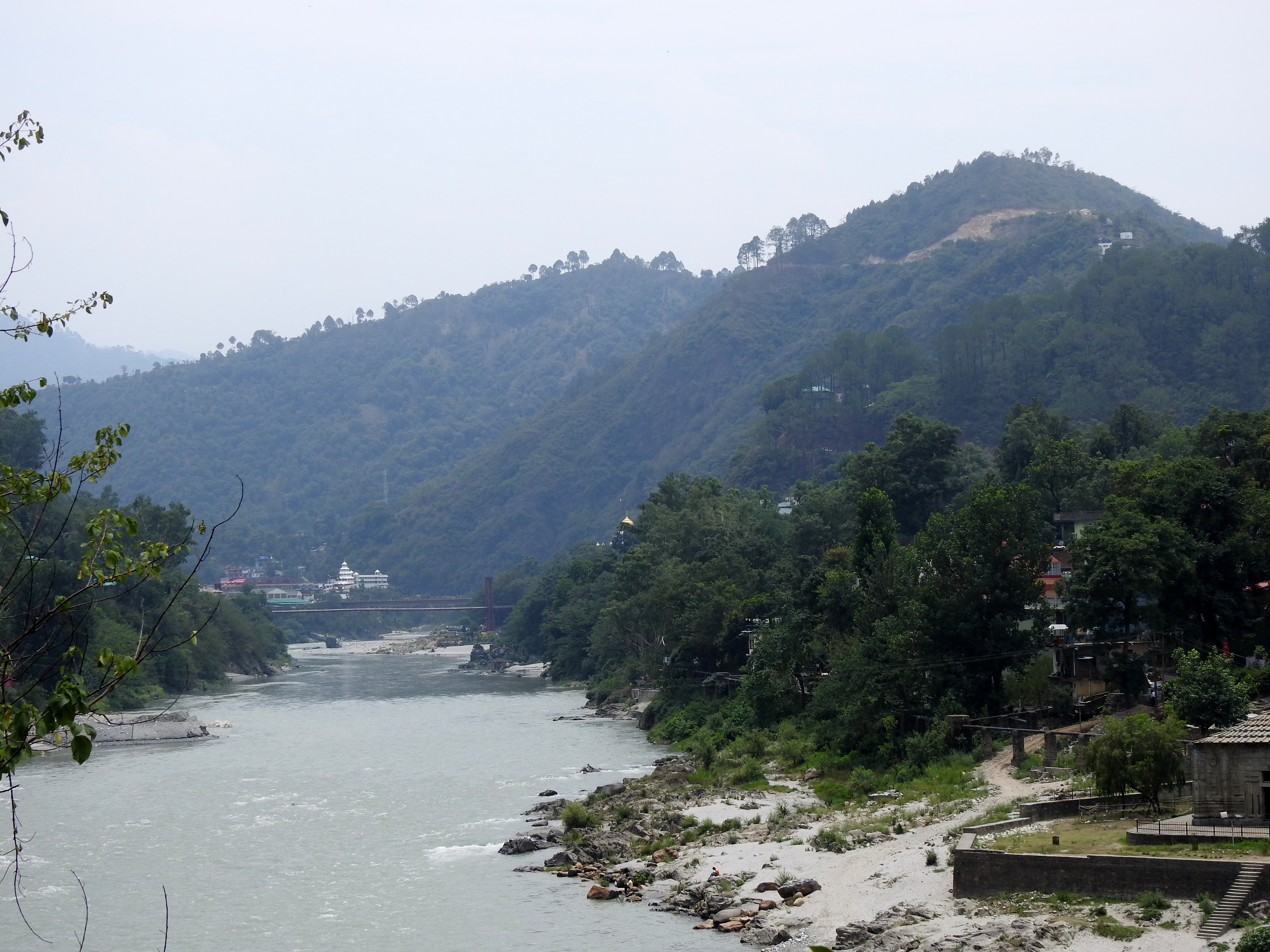
Bhimakali Temple -distant view

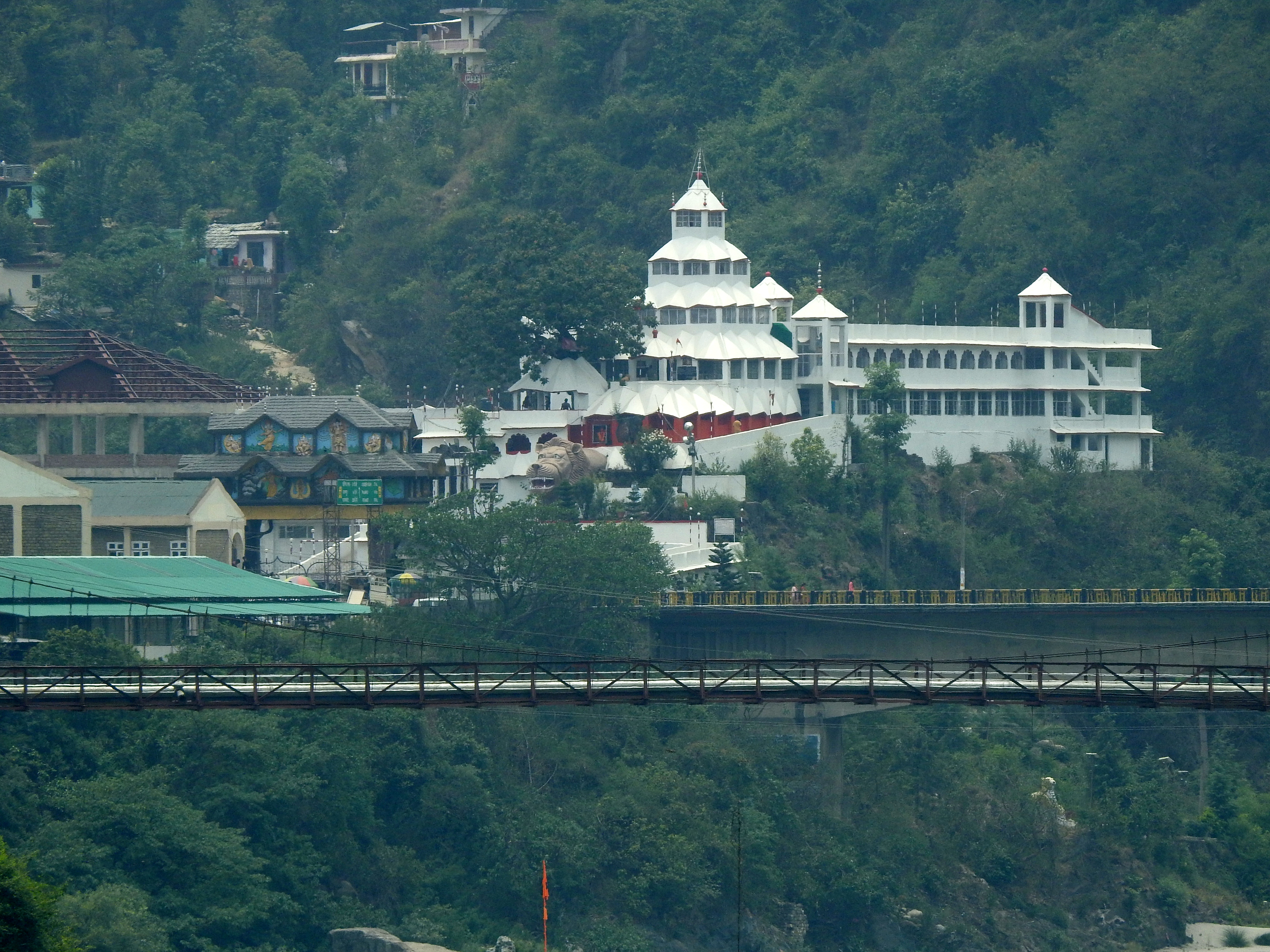
Bhimakali Temple-closer view
