= Kot Rajput =

Town in Punjab, Pakistan

- Town
- Location within Pakistan
- Coordinates: 31.9°N 73.13°E
- Country: Pakistan
- Province: Punjab
- Elevation: 173 m (568 ft)
- Time zone: UTC+5 (PST)

Kot Rajput is a town located in the Punjab province of Pakistan. It is located in Lahore District at 31°9'0N 73°13'0E with an altitude of 173 metres (570 feet). Neighbouring settlements include Kutruwal and Bhagthal.
