= List of Himachal Pradesh districts by GDP =

This page lists Districts of Himachal Pradesh by their District gross domestic product (GDP).

== List of Districts ==
This is a list of districts of Himachal Pradesh by their Gross District Domestic Product (GDDP) for the year 2005–06.

Rank	District	GDDP (in Rs. lakh)
1	Kangra	483,250
2	Solan	367,943
3	Shimla	364,033
4	Mandi	279,585
5	Sirmaur	180,060
6	Una	179,323
7	Kullu	174,167
8	Hamirpur	163,110
9	Bilaspur	144,199
10	Chamba	130,482
11	Kinnaur	50,842
12	Lahaul and Spiti	30,112
