= Singh Khalsa =

- Location in Pakistan
- Coordinates: 31°14′0″N 73°10′0″E
- Country: Pakistan
- Governorate: Punjab

Singh Khalsa is a town in the Punjab province of Pakistan. It is located in Lahore District at 31°14'0N 73°10'0E at an altitude of 172 metres (567 feet) and lies near the city of Lahore.
