= List of Monuments of National Importance in Himachal Pradesh =

This is a list of Monuments of National Importance (ASI) as officially recognized by and available through the website of the Archaeological Survey of India in the Indian state Himachal Pradesh. The monument identifier is a combination of the abbreviation of the subdivision of the list (state, ASI circle) and the numbering as published on the website of the ASI. 43 Monuments of National Importance have been recognized by the ASI in Himachal Pradesh.

== List of monuments of national importance ==
SL. No.	Description	Location	Address	District	Coordinates	Image
N-HP-1	Ganesh temple	Bharmour		Chamba	32°26′32″N 76°32′15″E	Upload Photo
N-HP-2	Laxmi (Lakhana) Devi temple	Bharmour		Chamba	32°26′32″N 76°32′14″E	Laxmi (Lakhana) Devi temple More images
N-HP-3	Mani Mahesh temple	Bharmour		Chamba	32°26′33″N 76°32′15″E	Mani Mahesh temple More images
N-HP-4	Nar Singh temple	Bharmour		Chamba	32°26′35″N 76°32′16″E	Nar Singh temple More images
N-HP-5	Shri Bajreshwari temple, Badrinath	Chamba, Himachal Pradesh		Chamba	32°33′41″N 76°07′51″E	Shri Bajreshwari temple, Badrinath More images
N-HP-6	Shri Bansi Gopal temple	Chamba, Himachal Pradesh		Chamba	32°33′28″N 76°07′33″E	Shri Bansi Gopal temple More images
N-HP-7	Shri Chamunda temple	Chamba, Himachal Pradesh		Chamba	32°33′10″N 76°07′46″E	Shri Chamunda temple More images
N-HP-8	Shri Hari Ram temple	Chamba, Himachal Pradesh		Chamba	32°33′21″N 76°07′23″E	Shri Hari Ram temple More images
N-HP-9	Shri Laxmi Narian group of temple in Mohalla Hathnala	Chamba, Himachal Pradesh		Chamba	32°33′28″N 76°07′27″E	Shri Laxmi Narian group of temple in Mohalla Hathnala More images
N-HP-10	Rock sculptures depicting Sita Ram, Hanuman etc.	Sarotha in Panjila Pargana of Chamba		Chamba		Upload Photo
N-HP-11	Shri Sita Ram temple in Mohalla Bangota	Chamba, Himachal Pradesh		Chamba	32°33′21″N 76°07′34″E	Shri Sita Ram temple in Mohalla Bangota More images
N-HP-12	Shri Shakti Devi temple	Chhatrari		Chamba	32°26′49″N 76°22′30″E	Shri Shakti Devi temple More images
N-HP-13	Champavati Temple	Chamba, Himachal Pradesh		Chamba	32°33′21″N 76°07′30″E	Champavati Temple More images
N-HP-14	Katoch Palace	Tira Sujanpur		Hamirpur	31°49′43″N 76°30′44″E	Katoch Palace More images
N-HP-15	Narbadeshwar Temple including the paintings therein as well as subsidiary shrines within the compound wall	Tira Sujanpur		Hamirpur	31°50′13″N 76°30′16″E	Narbadeshwar Temple including the paintings therein as well as subsidiary shrines within the compound wall More images
N-HP-16	Ashapuri Mata Temple	Ashapur		Kangra	31°58′21″N 76°34′36″E	Ashapuri Mata Temple More images
N-HP-17	Temple of Baijnath	Baijnath		Kangra	32°03′03″N 76°38′45″E	Temple of Baijnath More images
N-HP-18	Temple of Sidhnath	Baijnath		Kangra	32°03′01″N 76°38′36″E	Temple of Sidhnath More images
N-HP-19	Buddhist stupa known as Bhim-ka-Tila	Chaitru		Kangra	32°09′37″N 76°17′22″E	Upload Photo
N-HP-20	Kangra Fort	Kangra		Kangra	32°05′15″N 76°15′15″E	Kangra Fort More images
N-HP-21	Rock inscription	Khanyara		Kangra	32°12′29″N 76°20′52″E	Rock inscription More images
N-HP-22	Fort	Kotla		Kangra	32°14′08″N 76°02′34″E	Fort More images
N-HP-23	Masrur Temples with sculptures	Masrur		Kangra	32°04′22″N 76°08′14″E	Masrur Temples with sculptures More images
N-HP-24	Ruined fort	Nurpur		Kangra	32°18′11″N 75°52′55″E	Ruined fort More images
N-HP-25	Rock inscription	Pathiar		Kangra	32°08′17″N 76°24′32″E	Rock inscription More images
N-HP-26	Lord Eligin's tomb	Dharamshala		Kangra	32°14′33″N 76°19′06″E	Lord Eligin's tomb More images
N-HP-27	Temple of Basheshar Mahadev at Hat	Bajaura		Kullu	31°50′50″N 77°09′53″E	Temple of Basheshar Mahadev at Hat More images
N-HP-28	Temple of Gauri Shankar with sculptures	Dashal		Kullu	32°08′29″N 77°10′44″E	Temple of Gauri Shankar with sculptures More images
N-HP-29	Miniature stone shiva temple	Jagatsukh		Kullu	32°11′54″N 77°12′10″E	Miniature stone shiva temple More images
N-HP-30	Temple of Gauri Shankar with sculptures	Naggar		Kullu	32°06′47″N 77°09′51″E	Temple of Gauri Shankar with sculptures More images
N-HP-31	Hidimba Devi Temple	Manali		Kullu	32°14′54″N 77°10′54″E	Hidimba Devi Temple More images
N-HP-32	Tabo Monastery	Tabo		Lahaul & Spiti	32°05′37″N 78°22′58″E	Tabo Monastery More images
N-HP-33	Phoo Gumpha	Tabo		Lahaul & Spiti	32°05′47″N 78°22′56″E	Phoo Gumpha More images
N-HP-34	Mirkula Devi temple	Udaipur (Lahaul)		Lahaul & Spiti	32°43′39″N 76°39′42″E	Mirkula Devi temple More images
N-HP-35	Barsela Monuments	Mandi		Mandi	31°42′16″N 76°56′04″E	Barsela Monuments More images
N-HP-36	Panchvaktra Temple	Mandi		Mandi	31°42′41″N 76°56′08″E	Panchvaktra Temple More images
N-HP-37	Trilokinath Temple	Mandi		Mandi	31°42′46″N 76°56′09″E	Trilokinath Temple More images
N-HP-38	Ardhnareshwar Templef	Mandi		Mandi	31°42′46″N 76°55′48″E	Ardhnareshwar Templef More images
N-HP-39	Shiva temple	Mangarh		Sirmaur	30°45′07″N 77°15′31″E	Shiva temple More images
N-HP-40	Rashtrapati Niwas	Shimla		Shimla	31°06′13″N 77°08′32″E	Rashtrapati Niwas More images

== See also ==
- List of Monuments of National Importance in India for other Monuments of National Importance in India
- List of State Protected Monuments in Himachal Pradesh
