= Puran Chand Thakur =

Indian politician

Puran Chand Thakur (born 1958) is an Indian politician from Himachal Pradesh. He is a member of the Himachal Pradesh Legislative Assembly from Darang Assembly constituency in Mandi district. He won the 2022 Himachal Pradesh Legislative Assembly election representing the Bharatiya Janata Party.

== Early life and education ==
Thakur is from Darang, Mandi district, Himachal Pradesh. He is the son of Hari Ram Sardar. He studied Class 10 in 1975 and passed the examinations conducted by the Himachal Pradesh Board of School Education, Dharamshala. After 40 years in Congress party, he became a rebel and joined the BJP and was nominated from Darang seat.

== Career ==
Thakur won from Darang Assembly constituency representing the Bharatiya Janata Party in the 2022 Himachal Pradesh Legislative Assembly election. He polled 36,572 votes and defeated his nearest rival and eight time MLA, Kaul Singh Thakur, the former Himachal Pradesh Indian National Congress chief, by a margin of 618 votes.
