= Beas River disaster =

2014 mass drowning in Himachal Pradesh, India

- Date: 8 June 2014
- Time: 18:48 IST
- Location: Beas River, Mandi district, Himachal Pradesh, India
- Deaths: 25

The Beas River disaster refers to the 8 June 2014 drowning of 24 second-year engineering students (6 female and 18 male) and one tour operator from V.N.R. Vignana Jyothi Institute of Engineering and Technology of Hyderabad at the Beas River in Himachal Pradesh. The accident took place in the Thalout area (Shalanala Village) of Mandi district and was the result of a sudden surge of river water released upstream from the Larji hydro electric project.

== Incident ==
Forty-eight students and three faculty/staff members of the V.N.R. Vignana Jyothi Institute of Engineering and Technology (Hyderabad) were on an educational/industrial tour from Shimla to Manali, about 200 kilometres (130 miles) from Himachal Pradesh capital Shimla. Some of them were photographing themselves on the banks of the Beas River on the Mandi-Manali National Highway NH-21, when they were washed away as the water flow in the river suddenly increased. The surge of water occurred when the Larji hydroelectric power project opened its floodgates, sending tonnes of water downstream.

The dam water was released suddenly by the dam authorities without prior notice. Two students, Raman Teja Venigalla and Biswas Nandamuri, were alarmed when men on the shore collecting sand began to point and yell "Dam" just a few seconds before the water gushed in.

Footage surfaced on the internet two days after the incident which showed how the victims were caught unaware before the river carried them away. The video was shot by Bihari Lal, who was present about 100 metres above the river bed on a hilly area where a wedding was being held.

Sensing the danger Kiran Kumar Muppidi and Asish Mantha selflessly started helping the other students to reach the river bank. It has been reported by the surviving students that Kiran Kumar Muppidi had saved five fellow students before he slipped away. Devasish Bose was seen fighting hard to save one of the fellow students before he went missing. According to first hand witness the unofficial tour guide had jumped into the current to save some students.

== Rescue ==
Authorities deployed over 550 rescue team members including divers from NDRF, Sashastra Seema Bal (SSB), ITBP, the local firemen and policemen, and a private team of swimmers and divers trained by the Additional DGP of Police (Sports) in Telangana, Mr. Rajeev Trivedi and assisted by Supdt. of Police, Mr.Kartikeya. UAVs, multi-beam sonar, and lidar were also deployed to trace missing students along the 15 km stretch from Larji Dam to Pandoh Dam. Beginning 16 June, the parents of the students who were camping in Himachal Pradesh started leaving for their native places.

The bodies of 23 of the 24 students, and the tour guide were recovered. Student Kalluri Sree Harsha's body was not recovered.

== Government response ==
=== Probe ===
A case has been registered against officials of the Larji Hydroelectric Project and College for causing the death of 24 engineering students through negligence. The case was registered after eyewitnesses claimed that the hooter was not sounded before the flow of water into the river was increased.

An initial probe suggested that Larji power project was asked to reduce generation on the day of the tragedy but that plant officials instead shut it down. As a result of this, the water that had built up in its reservoir needed to be released, leading to a sudden surge in the Beas river. It has been reported by some news agencies that the Larji hydroelectric power project has been involved with local sand mafia and this was what made the officials open the gates without proper control.

== Compensation ==
The Himachal High Court awarded compensation of 20,00,000 rupees to parents of students to paid in a ratio of 60:30:10 by the electricity board, the college and the state of Himachal Pradesh.
