= Kandyohal =

Kandyohal is a village in Mandi district in the Indian state of Himachal Pradesh. It is located 4 kilometres (2.5 mi) from Sarkaghat.
