= Jawahar Thakur =

Indian politician

Jawahar Thakur (born 1954) is an Indian politician from Himachal Pradesh. He is a former member of the Himachal Pradesh Legislative Assembly from Darang Assembly constituency in Mandi district, representing the Bharatiya Janata Party.

== Early life ==
Thakur is from Darang, Mandi district, Himachal Pradesh. He is the son of the late Prem Singh. He studied till Class 9 at GSS School, Panarsa and dropped out in 1970. He is a farmer. He declared assets worth Rs.5 crore in 2017, in his affidavit to the Election Commission of India.

== Career ==
Thakur won the Darang Assembly constituency in the 2017 Himachal Pradesh Legislative Assembly election representing the Bharatiya Janata Party. He polled 31,392 votes and defeated his nearest rival, Kaul Singh of the Indian National Congress, by a margin of 6,541 votes.

Thakur began his electoral politics contesting the 1998 Himachal Pradesh Legislative Assembly election on the Himachal Vikas Congress ticket but lost to Kaul Singh Thakur of the Indian National Congress, by a margin of 13,018 votes. Again he contested from the Darang seat on the BJP ticket only in 2007 Himachal Pradesh Legislative Assembly election where he lost to Kaul Singh Thakur again by a margin of 1,809 votes. He contested on BJP ticket again in the 2012 Himachal Pradesh Legislative Assembly election but lost to Congress candidate Kaul Singh Thakur once again, this time by 2,232 votes.
