= Bhagher =

Village in Himachal Pradesh, India

Bhagher/Bhaghair is a village in Mandi district of Himachal Pradesh, India.
