= Himachal Road Transport Corporation =

State owned road Transport Corporation of Himachal Pradesh

Himachal Pradesh State Road Transport Corporation
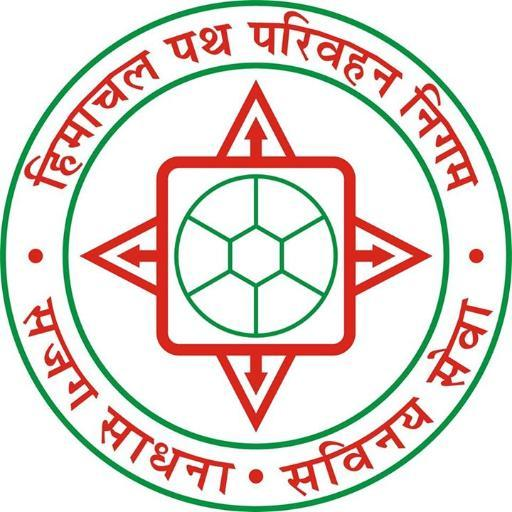

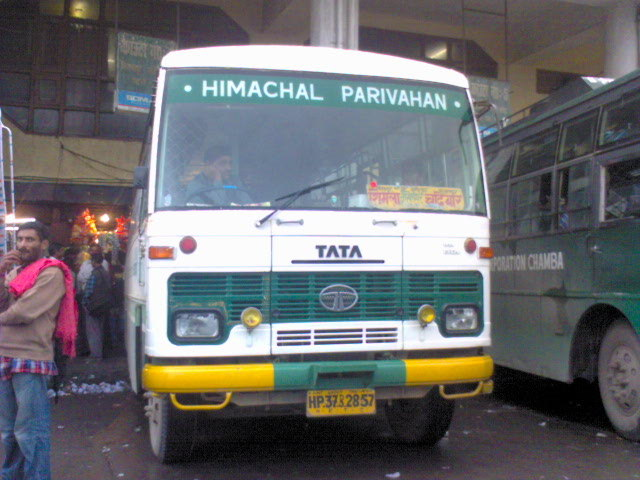
- Bus in Shimla's Old Bus Stand
- Parent: Government of Himachal Pradesh
- Founded: 1958 as Mandi-Kullu Road Transport Corporation ( HRTC 02-10-1974)
- Headquarters: HRTC Head Office, Shimla-171003, Himachal Pradesh, India
- Locale: Himachal Pradesh
- Service area: Himachal Pradesh, New Delhi, Haryana, Uttarakhand, Punjab, Jammu and Kashmir, Uttar Pradesh and Rajasthan
- Service type: Bus service
- Routes: 3,700
- Fleet: 3,302
- Fuel type: Diesel, Electric
- Website: www.hrtchp.com

Himachal Pradesh State Road Transport Corporation, also referred to as HPSRTC, is the state-owned road transport corporation of the state of Himachal Pradesh, India. HRTC provides bus services to towns and cities within Himachal Pradesh and the adjoining and nearby states of Uttarakhand, Punjab, Haryana, Delhi, Uttar Pradesh, Jammu and Kashmir and Rajasthan. HRTC is one of the first RTC's in India to offer a facility for online booking of tickets for all types of buses.

== History ==
The corporation was jointly founded by the Government of Punjab, Government of Himachal Pradesh and Railways as Mandi-Kullu Road Transport Corporation in 1958 to operate in Punjab and Himachal Pradesh. The corporation was merged with Himachal Govt. Transport on 2 October 1974 and was renamed as Himachal Road Transport Corporation.

== Supporting infrastructure ==
HRTC has its corporate office at Shimla and four divisional offices at Shimla, Mandi, Hamirpur and Dharamshala, each having integrated workshop. It has 31 depots each with a regional workshop and 11 sub-depots. HRTC also owns 3 bus body building units along with 3 tyre pre-cure re-treading plants at Mandi, Parwanoo and Jassur. HRTC routinely upgrades driving skills of its staff and train new drivers at its Driver Training Institutes located at Jassur, Mandi, Taradevi, Hamirpur, Nagrota Bagwan, Sarkaghat and Nalagarh.

== Operating Conditions ==
Other than regular services connecting Himachal to Chandigarh, Delhi and Haridwar; HRTC operates buses on some of the highest motorable roads in the world. These routes include Leh-Delhi, Shimla-Kaza, Kullu-Kaza, Manali – Reckongpeo, Shri Chintpurni Ji - Khatu Shyam and others. The Leh-Delhi routes operated by HRTC is 1203 km long and is the longest route by any RTC in India with a travel time of approx. 36 hours. The roads to Keylong & leh are also termed as the world's most treacherous roads.

== Fleet ==
HRTC has a fleet of 3302 buses running on around 3700 routes within and outside the state & has categorized its buses into 5 categories as

- HIMSUTA (हिमसुता) - Super Luxury buses in 2x2 configuration including Volvo and Scania AB
- HIMGAURAV (हिमगौरव)- Deluxe AC buses in 2x2 configuration
- HIMMANI (हिममणि) - Deluxe Non-AC buses in 2x2 configuration mostly Ashok Leyland
- HIMTARANG (हिमतरंग) - Electric buses in 2x2 configuration mostly played in cities of Himachal Pradesh
- HIMDHARA (हिमधारा)- AC buses in 3×2 configuration recently introduced Ashok Leyland
- ORDINARY and mini/local city buses Tata Marcopolo, Ashok Leyland[that ply in association with JnNURM to fulfill urban transportation needs.]

=== HIMSUTA (HRTC Volvo & Scania AB) ===
HRTC was the first operator in North India to start Volvo services on Shimla-Delhi and Manali-Delhi routes in 2005 on trial basis. The total Volvo and Scania AB fleet currently stands at 100+ buses with daily buses running from Delhi to Shimla, Manali, Dharamshala, Joginder Nagar, Baijnath, Bilaspur, Hamirpur, Mandi, Nalagarh, Chintpurni, Jawala Ji, Pathankot, Chamba, Una, Palampur, Rewalsar, Bir, Rohru, Jispa, Paonta Sahib and Sarkaghat. Also some new routes are started from Chandigarh Airport to Shimla, Manali, Dharmshala. Also new route started from Mata Vaishno Devi Katra to Shimla. HRTC's 'Himsuta' bus fleet include the Volvo 9400 model made on B7R/B8R chassis, Volvo 9600 made on B8R chassis and Scania AB Metrolink HD 12.0m. These 12 meter buses have ten rows of luxury semi-sleeper seats and charging ports. Additional facilities include free Wifi, entertainment on board and water bottles. The buses are also equipped with CCTV camera's for passenger security.

=== HIMGAURAV (Air-conditioned Deluxe buses) ===
This types of Buses no more opretaionable by HRTC air-conditioned Deluxe buses with 2X2 seating configuration on all important routes including Delhi-Shimla, Delhi-Manali, Delhi-Dharamshala and others. The buses also run on a few intrastate routes including Manali-Shimla. Besides the 11.4 meter luxury Isuzu buses, this class also includes buses built by JCBL and Amar on 210", 243" and 222" WB chassis by TATA or Ashok Leyland. The buses are provided with 35 comfortable and luxurious passenger seats with pushback.

=== HIM-MANI (NON AC – Deluxe buses) ===
HRTC operates Deluxe buses with 2X2 seating configuration on Previously running at Delhi-Dehra, Delhi-Shimla, Delhi-Manali, Delhi-Dharamshala, Delhi-Joginder nagar, Delhi-Baijnath, Delhi-Dharampur, Chamba-Shimla, Chamba-Deheradun, Deheradun-Shimla and Manali-Shimla routes. Because all of these delhi routes Have Bs6 Buses.The buses are provided with 31 comfortable and luxurious passenger seats with pushback. Along with LED facility, charging ports are available for each seat.

=== ORDINARY Buses ===
HRTC operates 47 and 37 seater ordinary buses on all routes. The buses come in 2X3 seating configuration and ply on ordinary fare. The buses are manufactured by ACGL and Tata Marcopolo on TATA 1512 (BS3) and 1613 (BS4) chassis. In 2022, 150 New Ashok Leyland build by SMK Prakash added in the fleet with USB charging for every seat in 47 and 37 seat configuration, Moreover In 2023, 150 TATA ACGL buses also introduced by Government in 47 and 28 seat configuration, All are these buses complies BS6 emission norms.

=== JnNURM (City buses) ===
The bus are purchased from TATA and Ashok-leyland. The buses are provided with 2X2 passenger seats. The buses are fitted with digital destination boards. The buses are also fitted with air Brakes and power steering. and a new technology is added like automated doors etc.

=== HIM-DHARA (AC-ORDINARY Buses) ===
Made by Ashok Leyland and Body by Prakash. Purchased in may/June 2022. Currently in operation.Some routes are Chamunda Devi to Vrindavan, Pathankot to Delhi,Rampur to Jammu,Bharol to Delhi via Baijnath,Joginder Nagar-Chandigarh, Mandi-Delhi, Sundernagar-Chamba, Shimla-Delhi, Palampur-Delhi, Joginder Nagar- Ludhiana, Mcleodganj-Delhi, Manali-Jammu, Dharampur-Delhi, Hamirpur-Delhi, Dehradun-chandigarh, Poanta sahib-Delhi, Shimla-Dehradun Hamirpur To Chandigarh Via Bhager Forlane,Pandoga To Chandigarh Via Nangal,Chamba To Chandigarh,Chamba To Shimla.Seat capacity is 51. Buses are provided with 3×2 passenger seat. Air conditioning above every seat and 2 USB post in every column.2 cctvs, first aids and co2 cylinders. Bus is BS6 type and have 2 entry gates.

=== HIM TARANG (Electric buses) ===
Made by Goldstone, the buses are capable of running 250 km on a single charge. However, that depends on road conditions and driving style. Apart from the zero emission completely electric, the bus also comes equipped with several advanced technologies. Named as ‘Him Tarang’ the bus runs between the Manali and Rohtang Pass as part of the state government's initiative to save the environment. It covers this 50 km route regularly which is very popular among the tourists. With the initiative, this electric bus is the first zero emission bus that runs at the highest place anywhere in the world. Also, recently it has been introduced in local routes in Shimla.

== List of depots with Division ==
Following are the HRTC depots Of Himachal Pradesh:

Depot	Division
Chamba	Dharmshala
Keylong	Mandi
Dharmshala	Dharmshala
Palampur	Dharmshala
Pathankot	Dharmshala
Baijnath	Dharmshala
Nagrota Bagwan	Dharmshala
Jogindernagar	Dharmshala
Jaisinghpur	Dharamshala
Sansarpur Terrece	Dharamshala
Dehra	Hamirpur
Mandi	Mandi
Sundernagar	Mandi
Kullu	Mandi
Karsog	Shimla
Sarkaghat	Mandi
Dharampur	Mandi
Hamirpur	Hamirpur
Una	Hamirpur
Bilaspur	Hamirpur
Rampur	Shimla
Shimla-1	Shimla
Shimla-2	Shimla
Shimla-3	Shimla
Rohru	Shimla
Solan	Shimla
Nalagarh	Hamirpur
Parwanoo	Shimla
Nerwa	Shimla
Nahan	Shimla
Reckong Peo	Shimla
