= List of State Protected Monuments in Himachal Pradesh =

This is a list of State Protected Monuments as officially reported by and available through the website of the Archaeological Survey of India in the Indian state Himachal Pradesh. The monument identifier is a combination of the abbreviation of the subdivision of the list (state, ASI circle) and the numbering as published on the website of the ASI. 5 State Protected Monuments have been recognized by the ASI in Himachal Pradesh. Besides the State Protected Monuments, also the Monuments of National Importance in this state might be relevant.

== List of state protected monuments ==
SL. No.	Description	Location	Address	District	Coordinates	Image
S-HP-1	Chamunda Temple	Chamba		Chamba district		Chamunda Temple More images
S-HP-2	Docha Mocha Temple	Kullu		Kullu		Upload Photo
S-HP-3	Mrikula Jain Temple	Lahaul- Spiti		Lahaul- Spiti		Upload Photo
S-HP-4	Gauri Shankar Temple	Mandi		Mandi		Upload Photo
S-HP-5	Surya Narayana Temple	Shimla		Shimla		Upload Photo

== See also ==
- List of Monuments of National Importance in Himachal Pradesh
- List of State Protected Monuments in India
