= Darang Assembly constituency =

Legislative Assembly constituency in Himachal Pradesh State, India

Coordinates: 31.87°N 76.32°E

Darang
- Constituency No. 30 for the Himachal Pradesh Legislative Assembly

Constituency details
- Country: India
- Region: North India
- State: Himachal Pradesh
- District: Mandi
- Lok Sabha constituency: Mandi
- Established: 1977
- Total electors: 91,525
- Reservation: None

Member of Legislative Assembly
- 14th Himachal Pradesh Legislative Assembly
- Incumbent Puran Chand Thakur
- Party: Bharatiya Janata Party
- Elected year: 2022

Darang Assembly constituency is one of the 68 constituencies in the Himachal Pradesh Legislative Assembly of Himachal Pradesh a northern state of India. It is a part of Mandi Lok Sabha constituency.

== Members of Legislative Assembly ==
Year	Member	Party
1977	Kaul Singh Thakur	Janata Party
1982	Kaul Singh Thakur	Indian National Congress
1985	Kaul Singh Thakur	Indian National Congress
1990	Dina Nath	Bharatiya Janata Party
1993	Kaul Singh Thakur	Indian National Congress
1998	Kaul Singh Thakur	Indian National Congress
2003	Kaul Singh Thakur	Indian National Congress
2007	Kaul Singh Thakur	Indian National Congress
2012	Kaul Singh Thakur	Indian National Congress
2017	Jawahar Lal Thakur	Bharatiya Janata Party
2022	Puran Chand Thakur	Bharatiya Janata Party

== Election results ==
=== Assembly Election 2022 ===
2022 Himachal Pradesh Legislative Assembly election: Darang
Party	Candidate	Votes	%	±%
BJP	Puran Chand Thakur	36,572	49.76%	▲2.54
INC	Kaul Singh Thakur	35,954	48.92%	▲11.54
NOTA	Nota	579	0.79%	▲0.18
BSP	Ramesh Kumar	385	0.52%	▼0.25
Margin of victory		618	0.84%	▼9.00
Turnout		73,490	80.30%	▼2.59
Registered electors		91,525		▲14.11
BJP hold		Swing	▲2.54	

=== Assembly Election 2017 ===
2017 Himachal Pradesh Legislative Assembly election: Darang
Party	Candidate	Votes	%	±%
BJP	Jawahar Thakur	31,392	47.22%	▲1.51
INC	Kaul Singh Thakur	24,851	37.38%	▼12.24
Independent	Puran Chand Thakur	7,672	11.54%	New
BSP	Ramesh Kumar	514	0.77%	▼0.20
NOTA	None of the Above	407	0.61%	New
Margin of victory		6,541	9.84%	▲5.93
Turnout		66,479	82.88%	▲4.38
Registered electors		80,208		▲10.32
BJP gain from INC		Swing	▼2.40	

=== Assembly Election 2012 ===
2012 Himachal Pradesh Legislative Assembly election: Darang
Party	Candidate	Votes	%	±%
INC	Kaul Singh Thakur	28,325	49.62%	▲0.99
BJP	Jawahar Thakur	26,093	45.71%	▲0.02
HLC	Kapil Dev	1,121	1.96%	New
Independent	Girdhari Lal	719	1.26%	New
BSP	Chuni Lal	556	0.97%	▼1.74
Margin of victory		2,232	3.91%	▲0.97
Turnout		57,081	78.51%	▲2.72
Registered electors		72,708		▼10.36
INC hold		Swing	▲0.99	

=== Assembly Election 2007 ===
2007 Himachal Pradesh Legislative Assembly election: Darang
Party	Candidate	Votes	%	±%
INC	Kaul Singh Thakur	29,898	48.64%	▼2.66
BJP	Jawahar Thakur	28,089	45.69%	▲7.16
BSP	Uttam Singh Chauhan	1,669	2.71%	New
NCP	Param Dev	851	1.38%	▲0.58
BBP	Tej Ram	523	0.85%	New
LJP	Guru Sharan Singh	432	0.70%	New
Margin of victory		1,809	2.94%	▼9.81
Turnout		61,474	75.79%	▲0.31
Registered electors		81,109		▲14.15
INC hold		Swing	▼2.66	

=== Assembly Election 2003 ===
2003 Himachal Pradesh Legislative Assembly election: Darang
Party	Candidate	Votes	%	±%
INC	Kaul Singh Thakur	27,508	51.29%	▼1.36
BJP	Ramesh Chand	20,668	38.54%	▲18.28
HVC	Dina Nath	3,502	6.53%	▼17.10
LHMP	Dharam Singh	1,522	2.84%	New
NCP	Param Dev	431	0.80%	New
Margin of victory		6,840	12.75%	▼16.27
Turnout		53,631	75.99%	▲1.69
Registered electors		71,052		▲16.90
INC hold		Swing	▼1.36	

=== Assembly Election 1998 ===
1998 Himachal Pradesh Legislative Assembly election: Darang
Party	Candidate	Votes	%	±%
INC	Kaul Singh Thakur	23,616	52.65%	▼3.95
HVC	Jawahar Thakur	10,598	23.63%	New
BJP	Ramesh Chand	9,087	20.26%	▼19.64
Republican Janata Party	Dina Nath	872	1.94%	New
CPI	Hardev Singh	458	1.02%	▼0.48
Margin of victory		13,018	29.02%	▲12.32
Turnout		44,853	74.33%	▼0.39
Registered electors		60,782		▲13.51
INC hold		Swing	▼3.95	

=== Assembly Election 1993 ===
1993 Himachal Pradesh Legislative Assembly election: Darang
Party	Candidate	Votes	%	±%
INC	Kaul Singh Thakur	22,482	56.60%	▲12.16
BJP	Dina Nath	15,848	39.90%	▼13.83
BSP	Kanshi Ram	636	1.60%	New
CPI	Hardev Singh	597	1.50%	New
Margin of victory		6,634	16.70%	▲7.41
Turnout		39,722	75.00%	▲2.69
Registered electors		53,547		▲8.36
INC gain from BJP		Swing	▲2.87	

=== Assembly Election 1990 ===
1990 Himachal Pradesh Legislative Assembly election: Darang
Party	Candidate	Votes	%	±%
BJP	Dina Nath	18,980	53.72%	▲20.93
INC	Kaul Singh Thakur	15,699	44.44%	▼22.49
Doordarshi Party	Puran Singh	245	0.69%	New
INS(SCS)	Brahma Nand	213	0.60%	New
Margin of victory		3,281	9.29%	▼24.85
Turnout		35,329	72.03%	▲1.23
Registered electors		49,415		▲33.99
BJP gain from INC		Swing	▼13.21	

=== Assembly Election 1985 ===
1985 Himachal Pradesh Legislative Assembly election: Darang
Party	Candidate	Votes	%	±%
INC	Kaul Singh Thakur	17,344	66.93%	▲9.80
BJP	Dina Nath	8,498	32.79%	▼7.62
Margin of victory		8,846	34.14%	▲17.42
Turnout		25,914	71.13%	▲4.54
Registered electors		36,879		▲6.62
INC hold		Swing		

=== Assembly Election 1982 ===
1982 Himachal Pradesh Legislative Assembly election: Darang
Party	Candidate	Votes	%	±%
INC	Kaul Singh Thakur	12,989	57.13%	▲45.99
BJP	Dina Nath	9,189	40.42%	New
LKD	Vipat Ram	558	2.45%	New
Margin of victory		3,800	16.71%	▲13.09
Turnout		22,736	66.62%	▲16.05
Registered electors		34,589		▲17.18
INC gain from JP		Swing	▲12.21	

=== Assembly Election 1977 ===
1977 Himachal Pradesh Legislative Assembly election: Darang
Party	Candidate	Votes	%	±%
JP	Kaul Singh Thakur	6,588	44.92%	New
Independent	Dina Nath Gautam	6,057	41.30%	New
INC	Prakash Chand	1,634	11.14%	New
Independent	Inder Singh	224	1.53%	New
Independent	Nawal Thakur	129	0.88%	New
Margin of victory		531	3.62%	
Turnout		14,666	50.60%	
Registered electors		29,519		
JP win (new seat)				

== See also ==
- List of constituencies of Himachal Pradesh Legislative Assembly
