= Thunag =

Tehsil in the Mandi District of Himachal Pradesh

Thunag is a tehsil in the Mandi District of Himachal Pradesh.
