= Trilokinath Temple, Mandi =

Shaivite temple in Himachal Pradesh

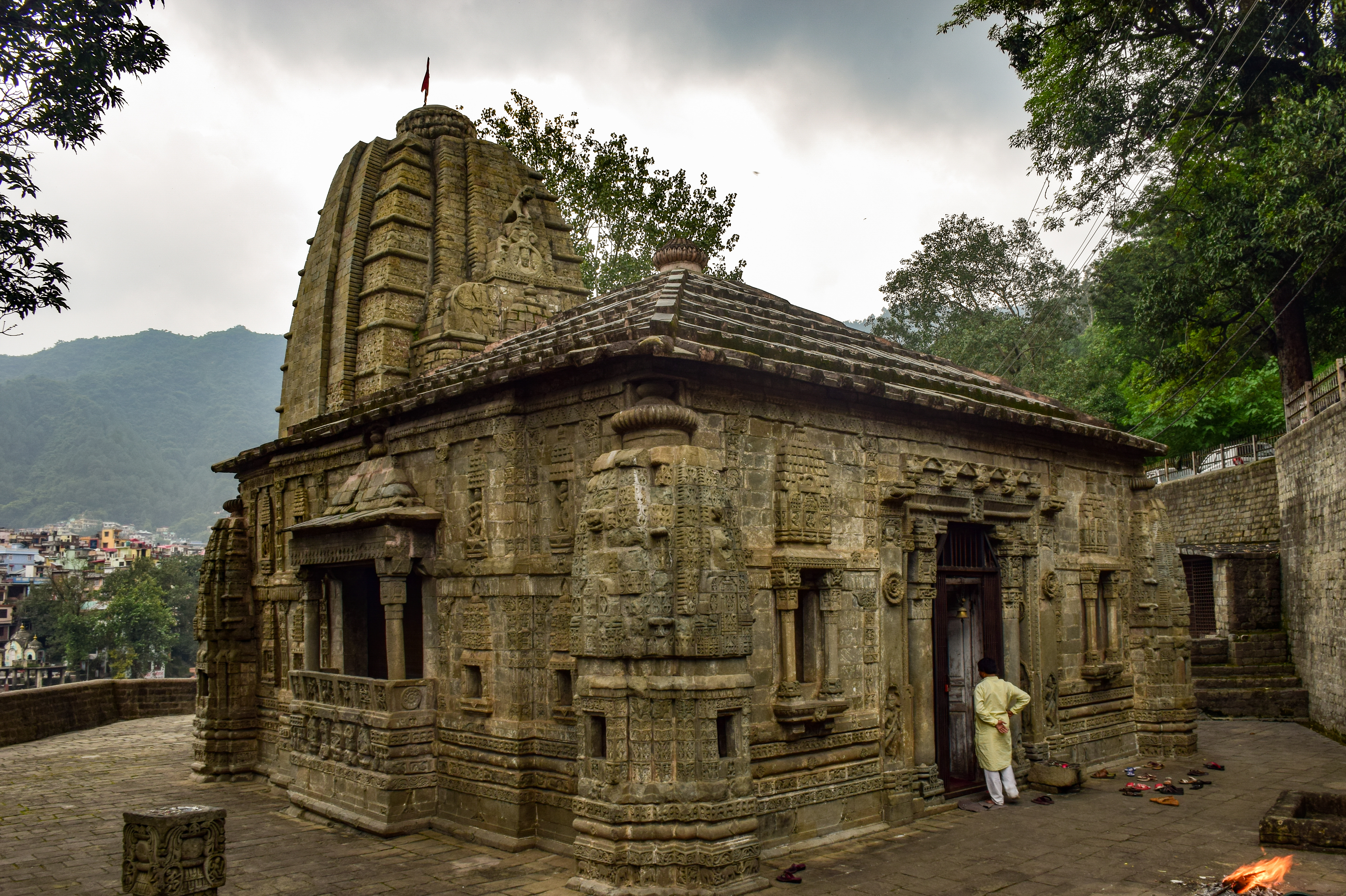

- Location within Himachal Pradesh Location within India

Religion
- Affiliation: Hinduism; Buddhism
- District: Mandi district

Location
- Location: Mandi
- State: Himachal Pradesh
- Country: India
- Interactive map of Trilokinath Temple, Mandi
- Coordinates: 31°42′25″N 76°55′54″E

Architecture
- Completed: 16th century

The Trilokinath Temple in Mandi, Himachal Pradesh, is dedicated to the Hindu god Shiva. It contains a three-faced murti (image) of Shiva, which is the origin of the name Trilokinath, "Lord of Three Worlds".

The temple is a popular destination for tourists and pilgrims, and a number of festivals are celebrated there every year.

== History ==
It is believed that Sultan Devi, queen of Raja Ajber Sen, in the 16th century, commissioned the construction of the Trilokinath temple, which was built around 1520 AD.

The Sena dynasty who built this temple are believed to have come from Karnataka who settled in Bengal by taking over the declining Pala Empire. After losing lands to the devastating attacks by Bakhtiyar Khalji in 1203–1204 CE, the Sena dynasty lost north-east Bengal, the eastern parts of Bengal remained under the Senas until 1230 CE. The Sena Dynasty built many temples, including one in Kashmir, named and known as Sankara Gaureshwara.

The princely state of Mandi was created in the 13th century by Bahu Sen, but the city of Mandi emerged as a separate entity much later, at the beginning of the 16th century. Bahu Sen's descendant Raja Ajber Sen (19th descendant of Bahu Sen), who founded the present Mandi city centred around the Bhootnath Temple between 1500 CE-1534 CE, built his palace near this temple. The temple of Trilokinath was constructed during his rule by his queen.

== Architecture ==
It is one of the oldest temples in the town, and features images of Narada, Sharda and many Hindu deities.

The Shikhara or the dome of the temple originally had Chaitya dormers in relief as is evident from some parts still showing the design. There are detailed carvings on the walls of the temple.

== Location ==
Trilokinath Temple is located in Purani (old) Mandi. It is almost a kilometer away from the main bus stand of Mandi. The temple is situated on the bank of the Beas River on the old Victoria Bridge at Mandi - Pathankot National Highway.

== Gallery ==
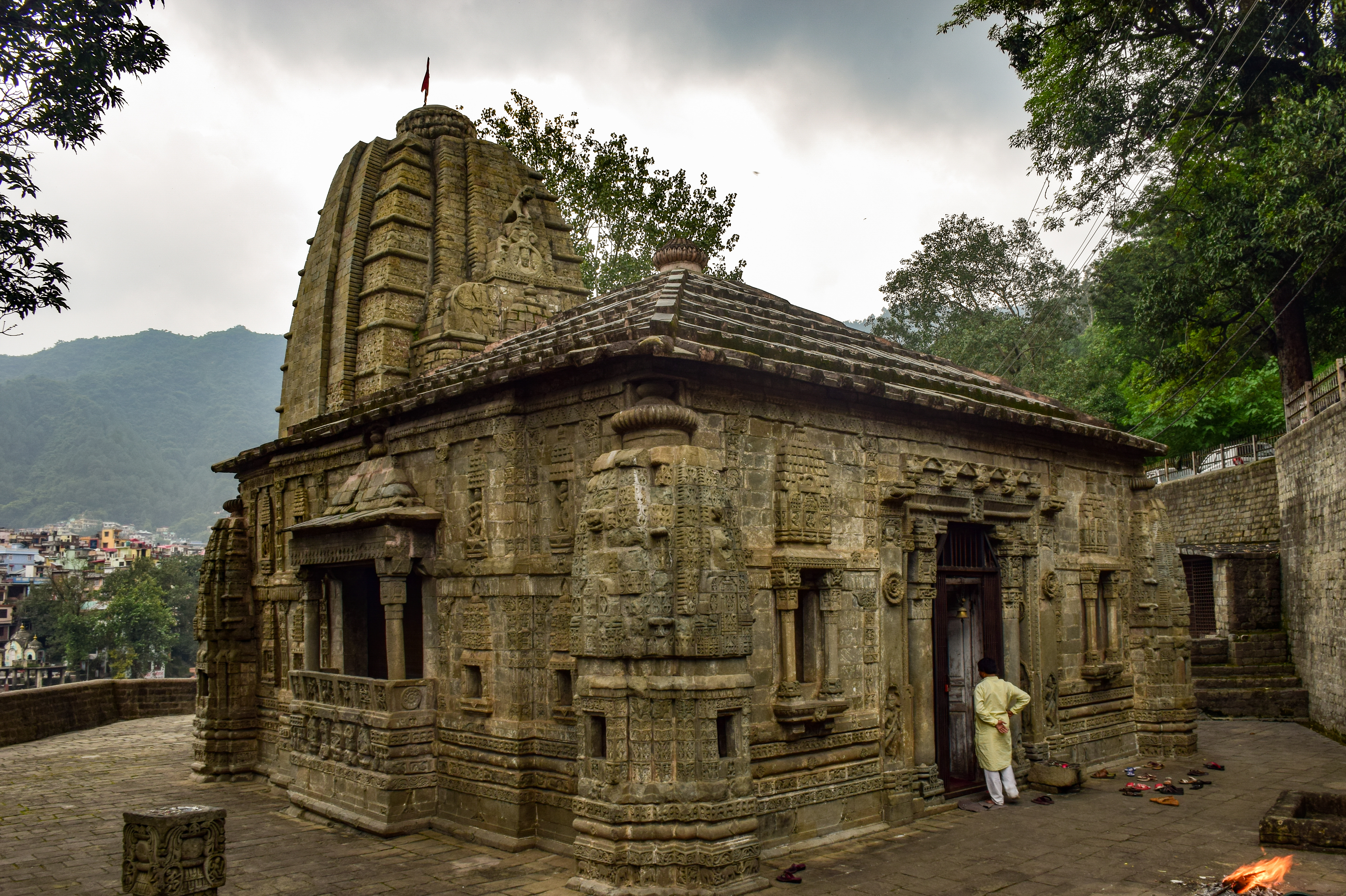
Trilokinath Temple full view

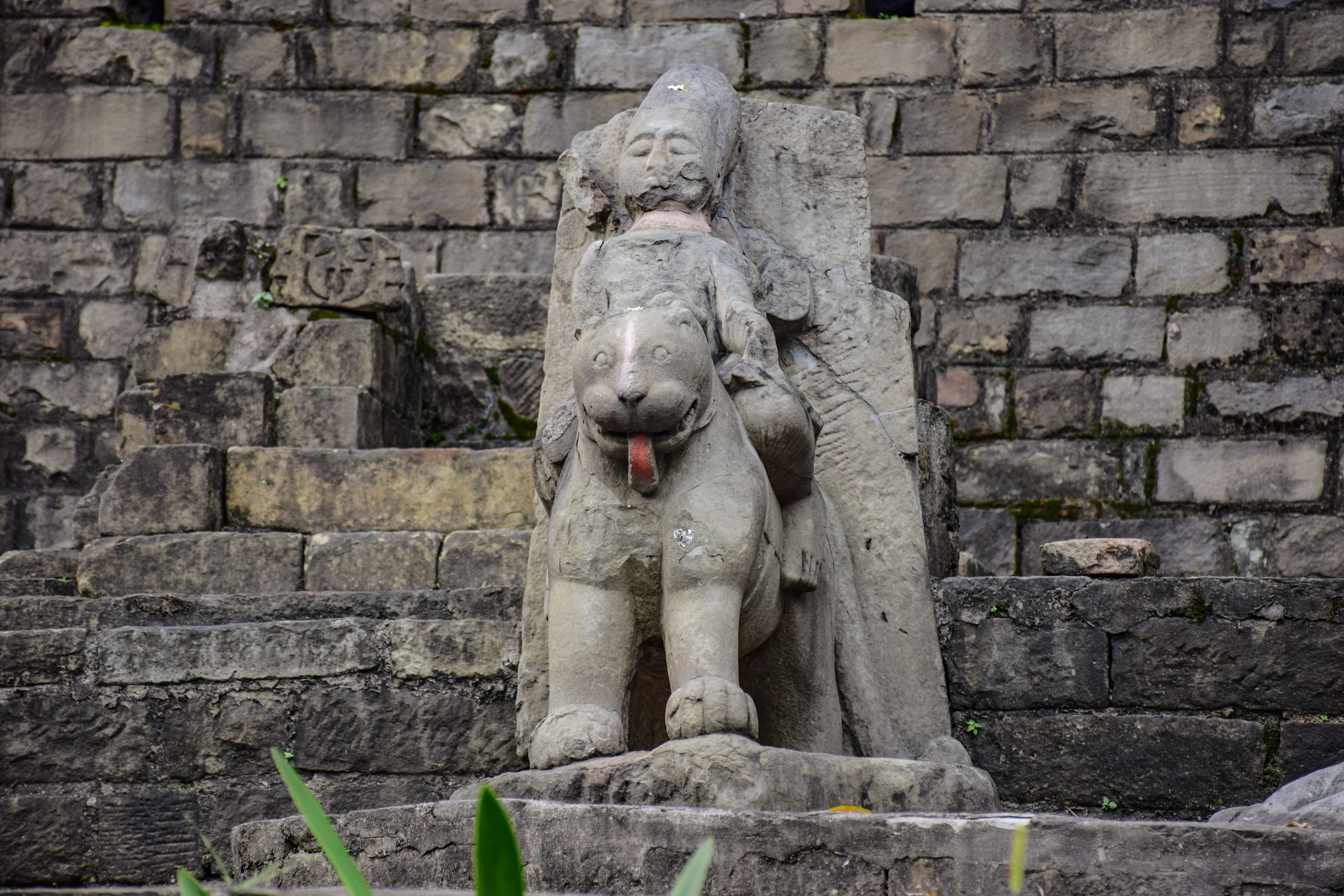
Sculpture in Trilokinath Temple

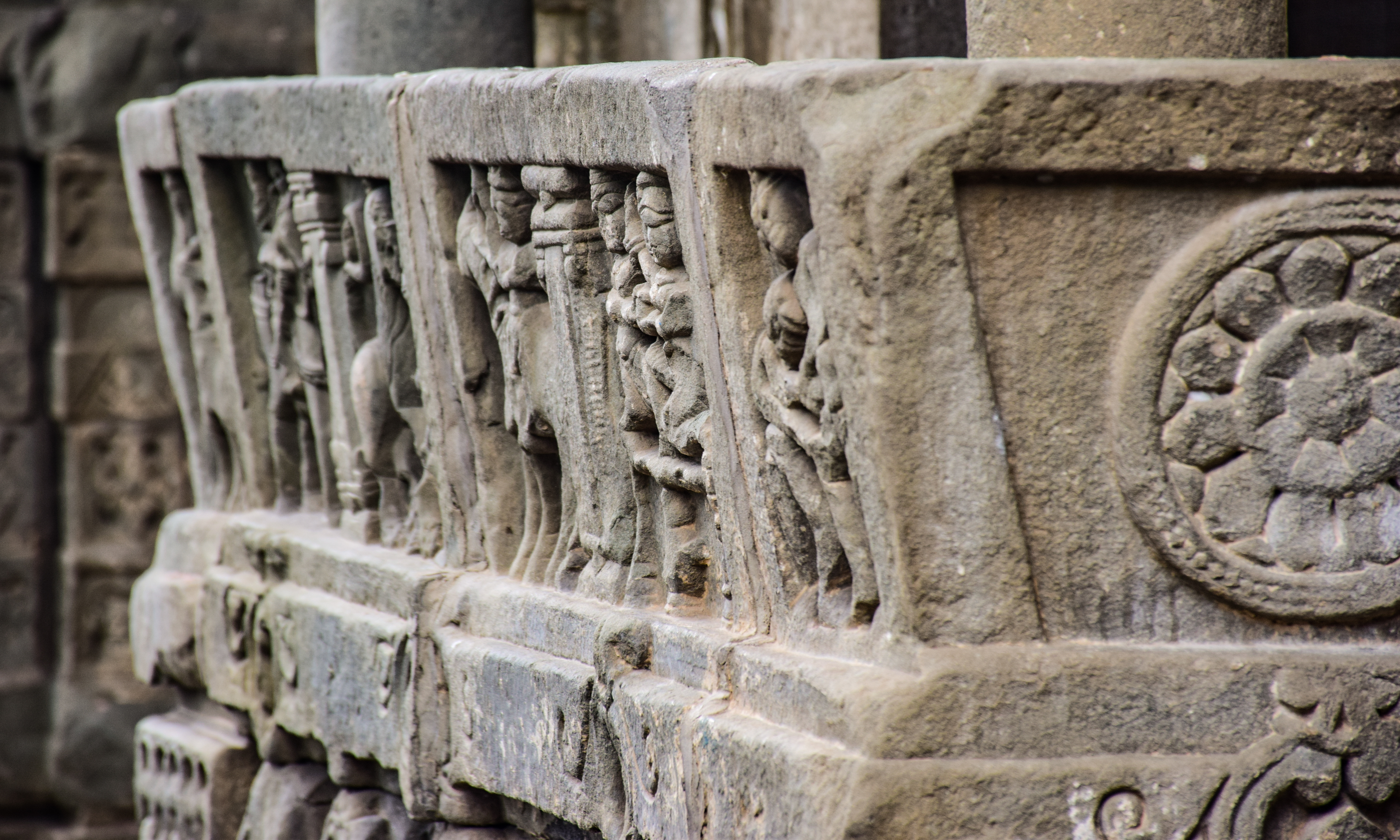
Stone carving at Trilokinath Temple

== See also ==
- The Mata Kuan Rani Temple, or 'Princess of the Well Temple', is situated near the bank of the Beas River in the town of Mandi, Himachal Pradesh, India.
- Indian Institute of Technology Mandi (IIT Mandi) is a public technical and research university located in Mandi district of Himachal Pradesh.
