= Beas River =

River in India

Beas River Vyas River
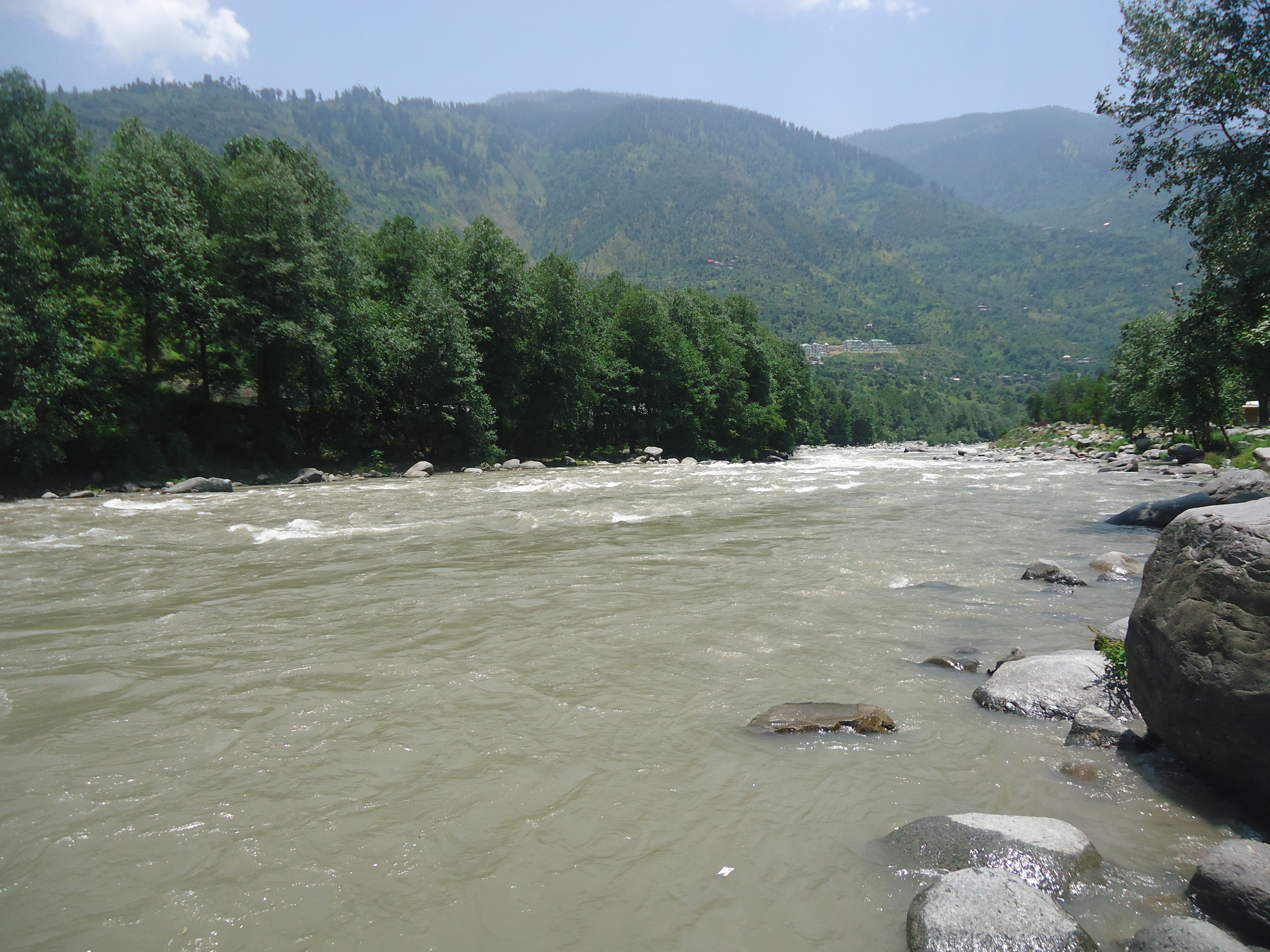
- The Beas River in Himachal Pradesh

Location
- Country: India
- State: Himachal Pradesh, Punjab

Physical characteristics
- Source: Beas Kund
  - location: Himalayas, Himachal Pradesh
  - coordinates: 32°21′59″N 77°05′08″E
- Mouth: Sutlej River
  - location: Harike, Harike Wetland, Tarn Taran district, Punjab
  - coordinates: 31°09′16″N 74°58′31″E
- Length: 470 km (290 mi)
- Basin size: 20,303 km^{2} (7,839 sq mi)
- Discharge
  - location: Mandi Plain
  - average: 499.2 m^{3}/s (17,630 cu ft/s)

The Beas River, (Note: Punjabi pronunciation: [be.jäːsᵊ]; Hindustani pronunciation: [bjɑːs]) anglicized from Vyas River (Hindi: व्यास नदी) in India, is a river in northwestern India, flowing through the states of Himachal Pradesh and Punjab, and is the smallest of the five major rivers of the Punjab region. Rising in the Himalayas in central Himachal Pradesh, the river flows for approximately 470 kilometres (290 mi) into the Sutlej River in Punjab. Its total length is 470 kilometres (290 mi) and its drainage basin is 20,303 square kilometres (7,839 sq mi) large.

As of 2017, the river is home to a tiny isolated population of the Indus dolphin.

== Etymology ==
Rig-veda calls the river Vipāś, which means unfettered, in later Sanskrit texts it's been called Vipāśā विपाशा. Yāska identifies it with Argrikiya.

According to legends,Veda Vyasa, the author of the Indian epic Mahabharata, is the eponym of the river Beas; he is said to have created it from its source lake, the Beas Kund.

According to other legends, before Veda Vyasa, the Vipasa river was known as Saraswati. Rishi Vashishta, the great-grandfather of Vyasa, tried to jump into this river from an overlooking hillock, to sacrifice his soul. He tied himself with several cords to drown himself. However, the river altered form to become a sandbed, saving him. And in this course, the cords got broken, so Vashishta named the river Vipasa, which means cord-breaker. On account of this incident, the great Rishi opted to settle near the river, and made it a residence for some years. Thereby, it became known as Vashisht (after Vashishta). We can find Vashishta Brahmarishi Temple in this village.

Ancient Greeks called it Hyphasis (Greek: Ύφασης). Plinius called it Hypasis, an approximation to the Vedic Vipāś. Other classical names are Hynais, Bipasis, Bibasis.

In modern times, the river has also been called Bias or Bejah.

== History ==
The Beas River marks the easternmost border of Alexander the Great's conquests in 326 BC. It was one of the rivers that created problems in Alexander's invasion of India. His troops mutinied here in 326 BC, refusing to go any further East in Mukerian. Alexander shut himself in his tent for three days, but when the mutiny did not cease he gave in, raising twelve colossal altars to mark the limit and glory of his expedition. The exact location and fate of these altars are unknown, although one historian has suggested that they were later reused to create some of the Pillars of Ashoka.

According to the Kavyamimansa of Rajasekhara, the kingdom-territories of the Gurjara-Pratihara monarch Mahipala I extended as far as the upper course of the river Beas in the north-west.

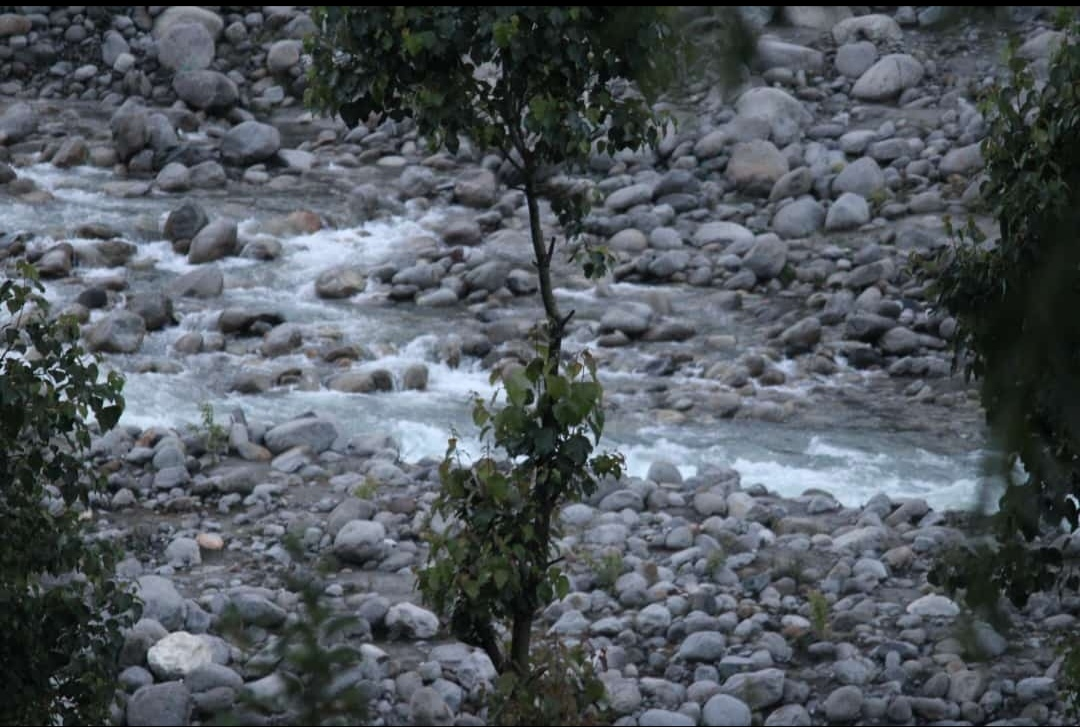
Beas River in 2022 May

2014 Beas River Tragedy occurred when 24 engineering students and one tour operator drowned when the flood gates of the Larji dam were opened.

During 2023 monsoon, flooding in Beas caused substantial damages in the state of Himachal Pradesh. Damage to the state is estimated to be $1B, the loss of life is over 400, and little government relief is available to assist with social costs and recovery.

== Course ==
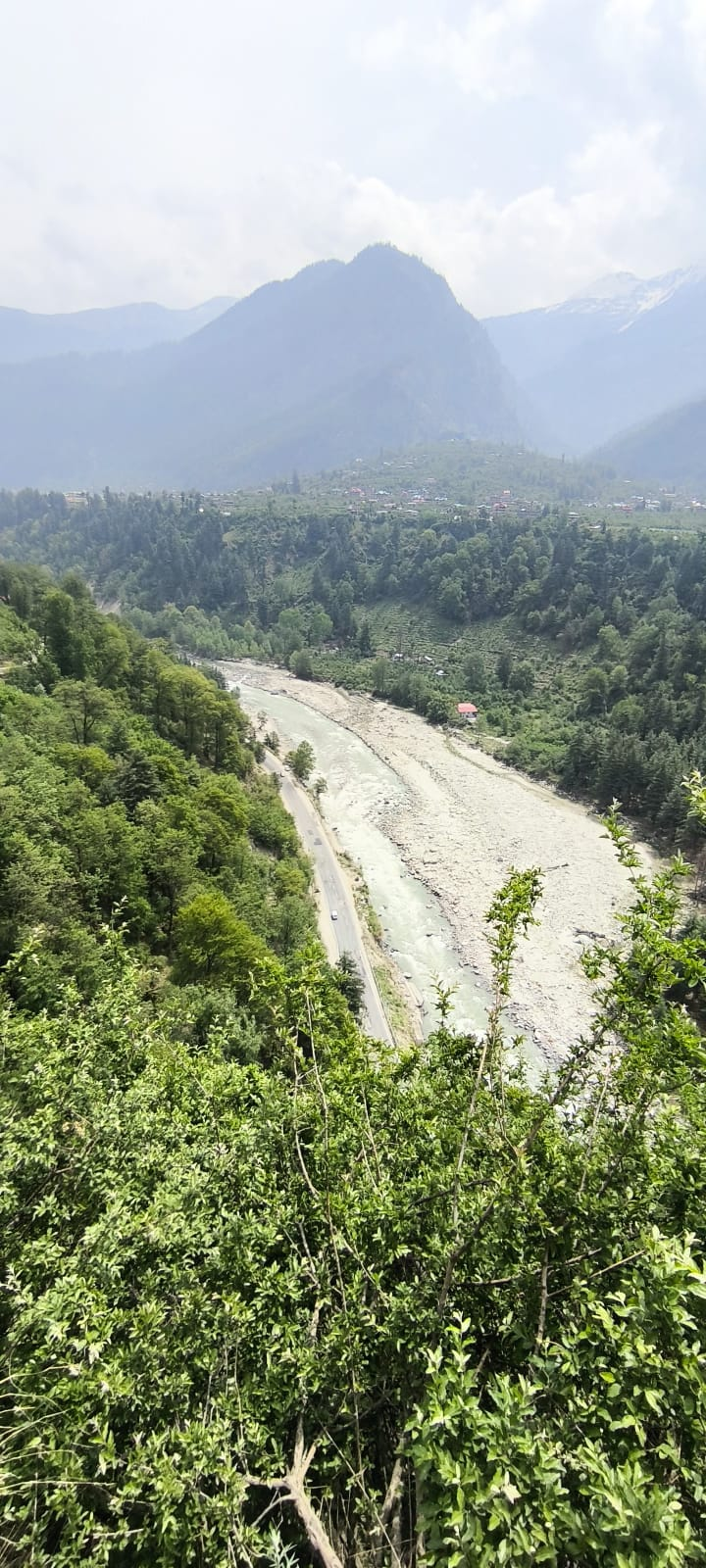
Beas River near Manali

=== Present course ===
The river rises 4,361 metres (14,308 ft) above sea-level on the southern face of Rohtang Pass in Kullu. It traverses the Mandi District and enters the Kangra District at Sandhol, 590 metres (1,940 ft) above sea-level. During its lower course the Beas is crossed by numerous ferries, many of which consist of inflated skins (darais). Near Reh in Kangra District it divides into three channels, which reunite after passing Mirthal, 300 metres (980 ft) above sea-level. On meeting the Sivalik Hills in Mukerian, the river sweeps sharply northward, forming the boundary with Kangra District. Then, bending round the base of the Sivalik Hills, it takes the southerly direction, separating the districts of Gurdaspur and Hoshiapur. After touching the Jalandhar district for a short distance, the river forms the boundary between Amritsar and Kapurthala. Finally the Beas joins the river Sutlej at the south-western boundary of Kapurthala district of Punjab after a total course of 470 kilometres (290 mi). The chief tributaries are Bain, Banganga, Luni and Uhal. The Sutlej continues into Pakistani Punjab and joins the Chenab River at Uch near Bahawalpur to form the Panjnad River; the latter in turn joins the Indus River at Mithankot.

The water of the Beas river is allocated to India under the terms of the Indus Waters Treaty between India and Pakistan. The mean annual flow is 14.203 million acre feet (MAF).

=== Historical course ===
Historically, the Beas River has flowed from its present-day junction with the Sutlej to Lahore and Montgomery districts, after which it joined with the Chenab near Shujabad before the Chenab turns westward. By 1245, the Beas river occupied the former bed of the Chenab river that passed by Dipalpur. The Beas River used to run from Kasur to Chunian and then Shergarh in Okara. The old Beas river flowed south of the site of Harappa. The flow of the Beas river, which ran through the high-bar of the Bari Doab, shifted between 1750 and 1800, with it being captured by the Sutlej river, after many previous changes to its flow throughout the preceding centuries.

== Dams ==
In the 20th century, the river was developed under the Beas Project for irrigation and hydroelectric power generation purposes. Listed upstream to downstream:

- Pandoh Dam (Beas Satluj Link Project I), 990 MW, 41 MCM, in Mandi district of Himachal Pradesh, diverts Beas River water to the Sutlej River through a system of tunnels and channels, connecting the two rivers for power generation.
- Pong Dam (Beas Dam / Maharana Pratap Sagar), 396 MW, 8570 MCM, in Kangra district of Himachal Pradesh, is an earth-fill dam built for water storage, irrigation, and hydroelectric power generation, completed in 1974.
- Shahnehar Barrage/Headwork, 207 MW, 4.64 MCM live capacity, just downstream of Pong Dam in Kangra district of Himachal Pradesh was completed in 1983.
  - Shahnehar Canal takes off from the Shahnehar barrage to supply water for irrigation needs and four cascading power houses at the canal drops before releasing water further downstream in the Beas river.
- Harike Barrage, 45 km northeast of Ferozepur in Ferozepur district of Punjab near Pakistan border, is located at the confluence of the Beas and Sutlej rivers for diverting water into nearby canals for irrigation in Rajasthan and Punjab.
  - Indira Gandhi Canal
  - Ganga Canal (Rajasthan)

== Pollution ==
On 17 May 2018, countless number of fish and other aquatic animals were found dead in Beas river due to a discharge of molasses from a sugar mill situated on its shore at Kiri Afgana village in Gurdaspur district. Locals have noted that the river colour has changed to rust brown and dead fishes were floating in the river. The Punjab Pollution Control Board have ordered the closure of the factory and an inquiry has been initiated. The sugar mill has been charged a fine of ₹2.5 million (equivalent to ₹3.3 million or US$35,000 in 2023) for negligence.

== Gallery ==
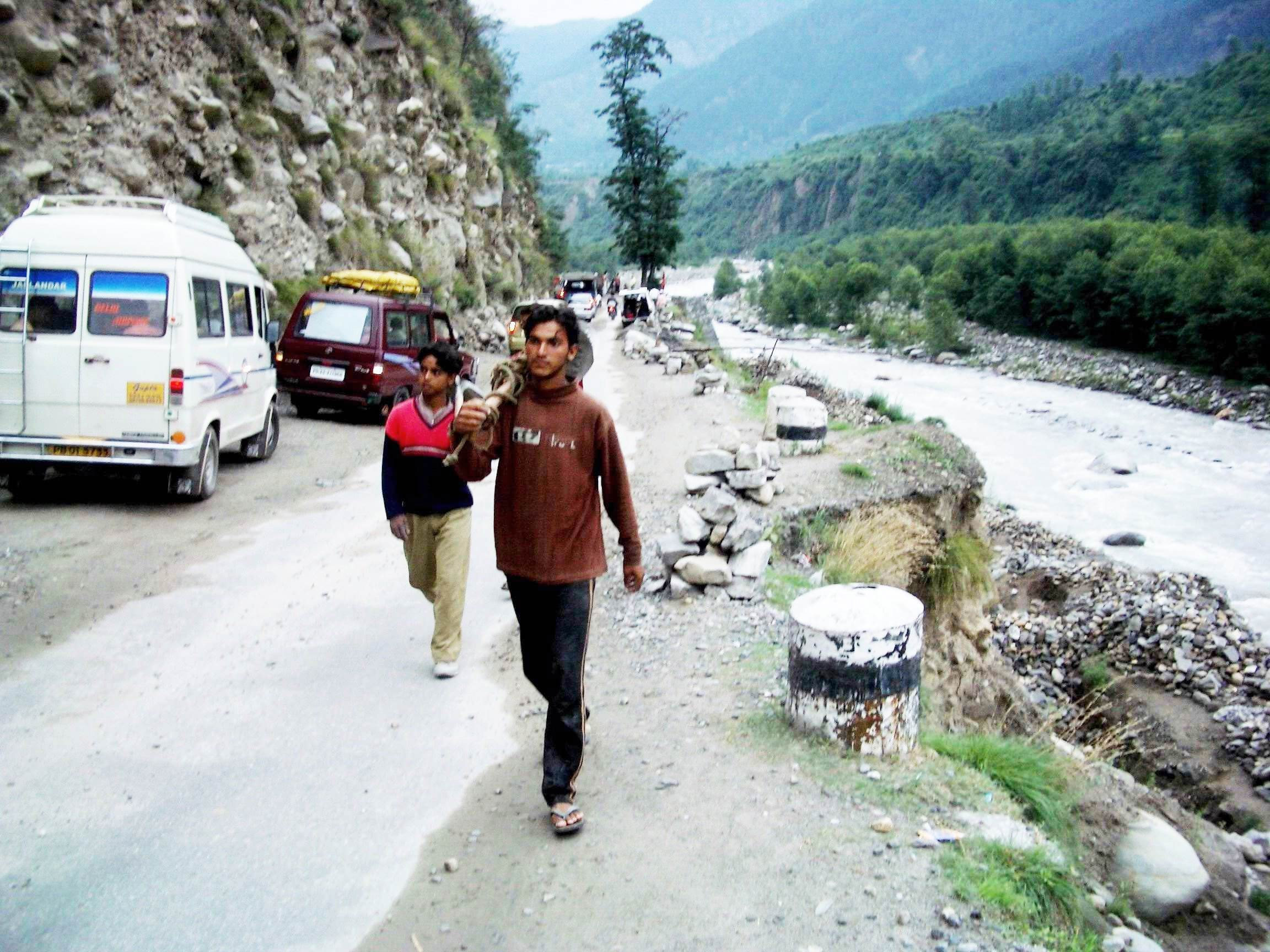
Delay on the road — Upper Beas River near Manali, Himachal Pradesh, Manali.

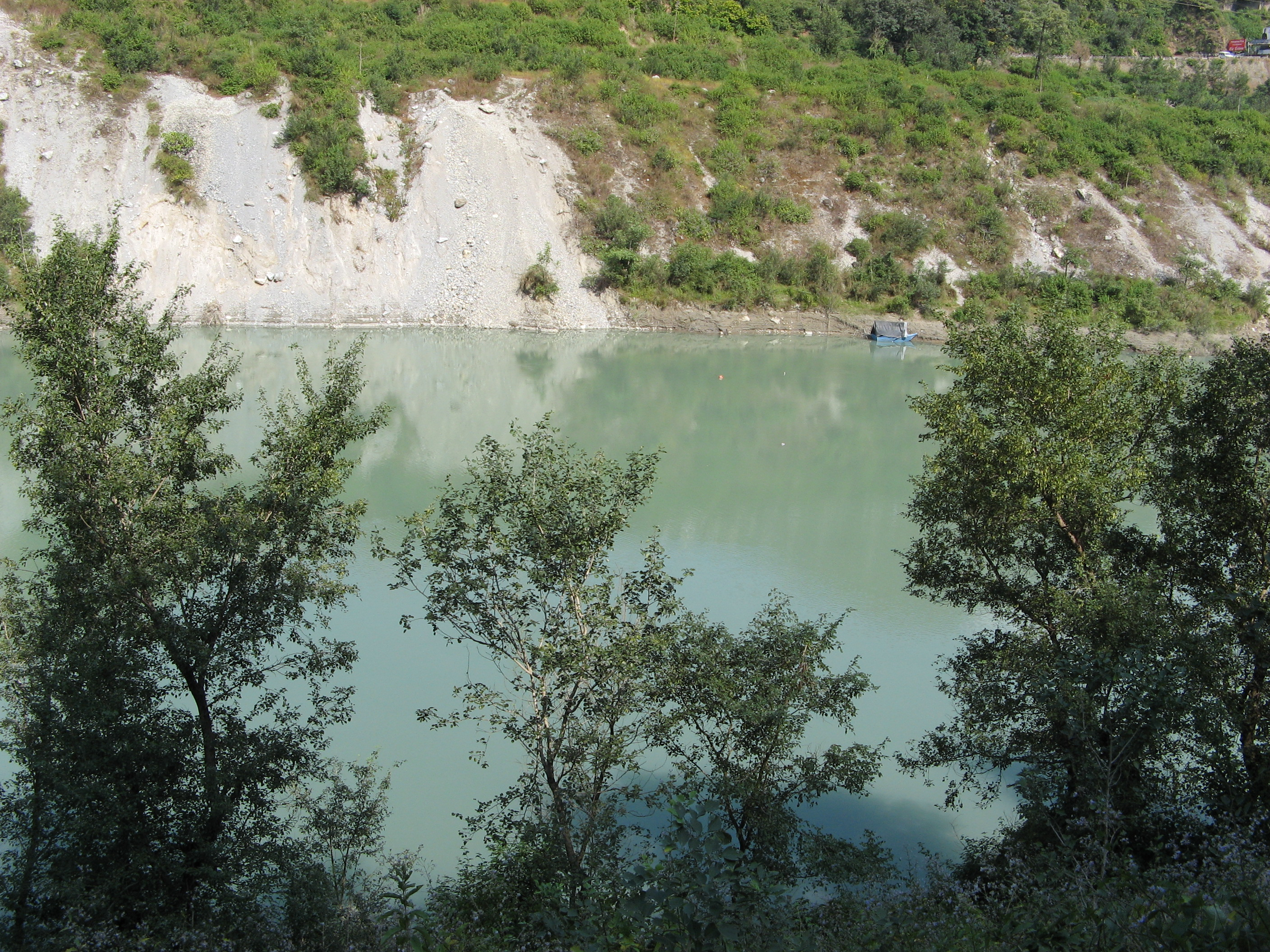
Beas River in Himachal Pradesh

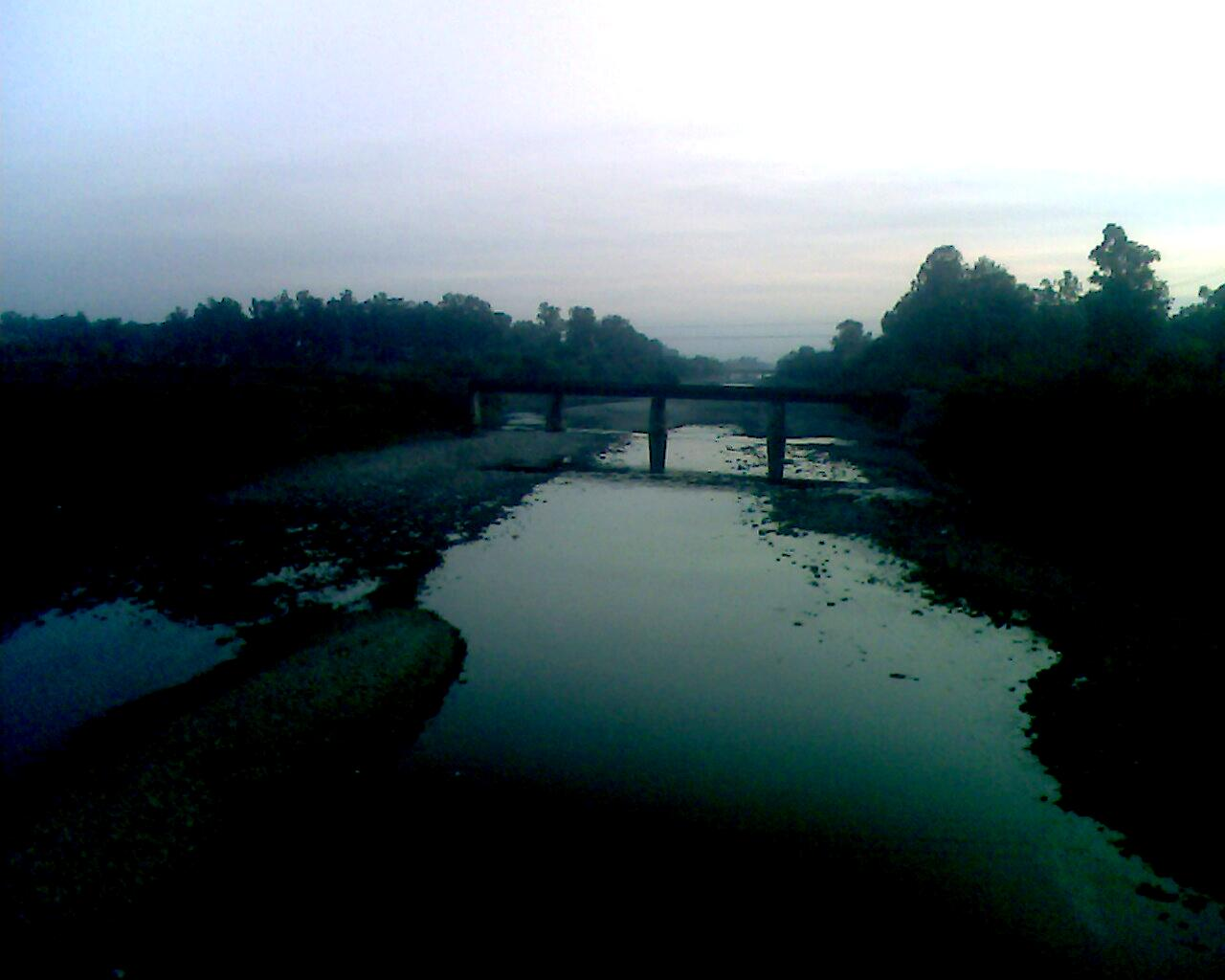
Beas River in Pathankot

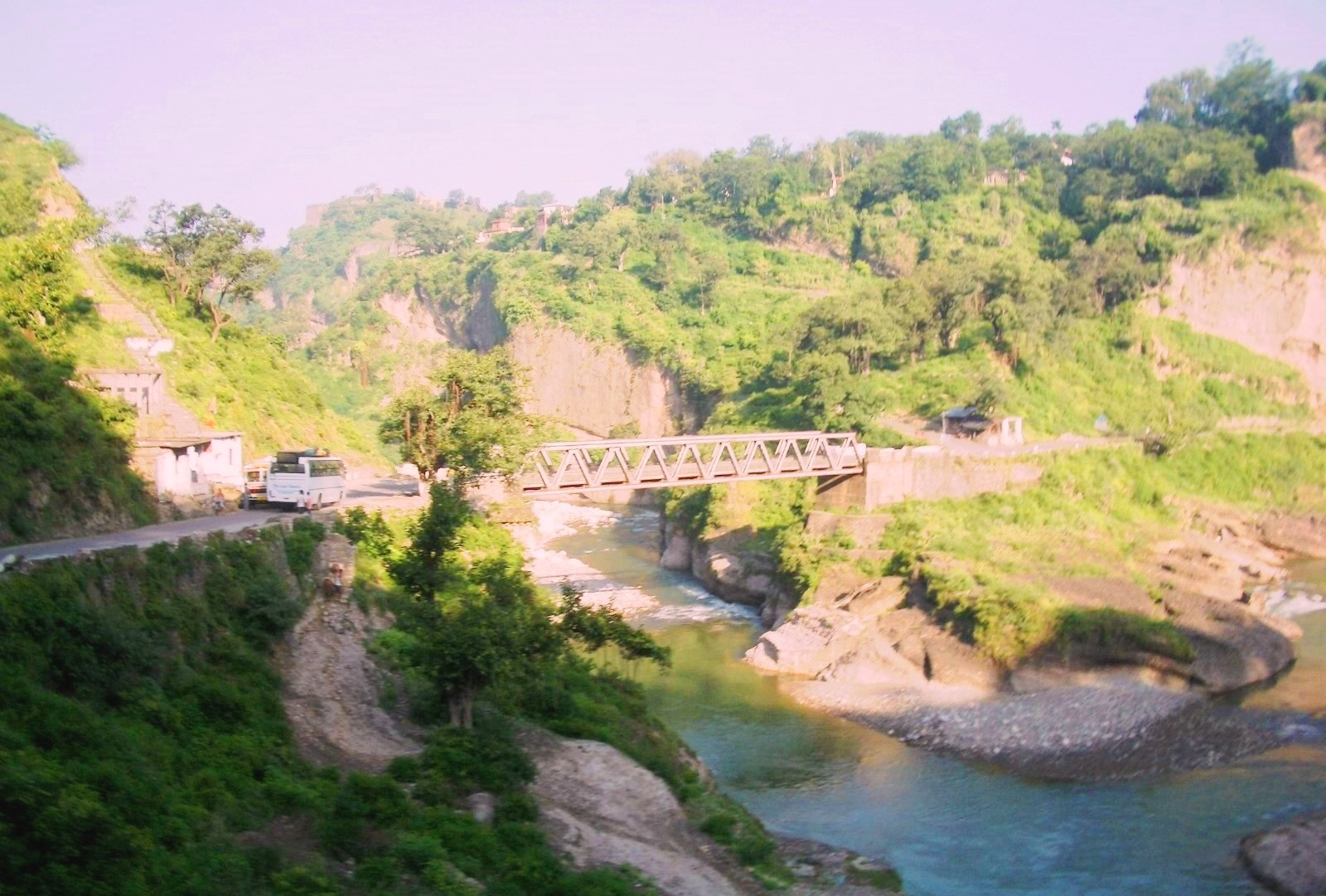
Bridge across the Beas River, south of Dharamsala

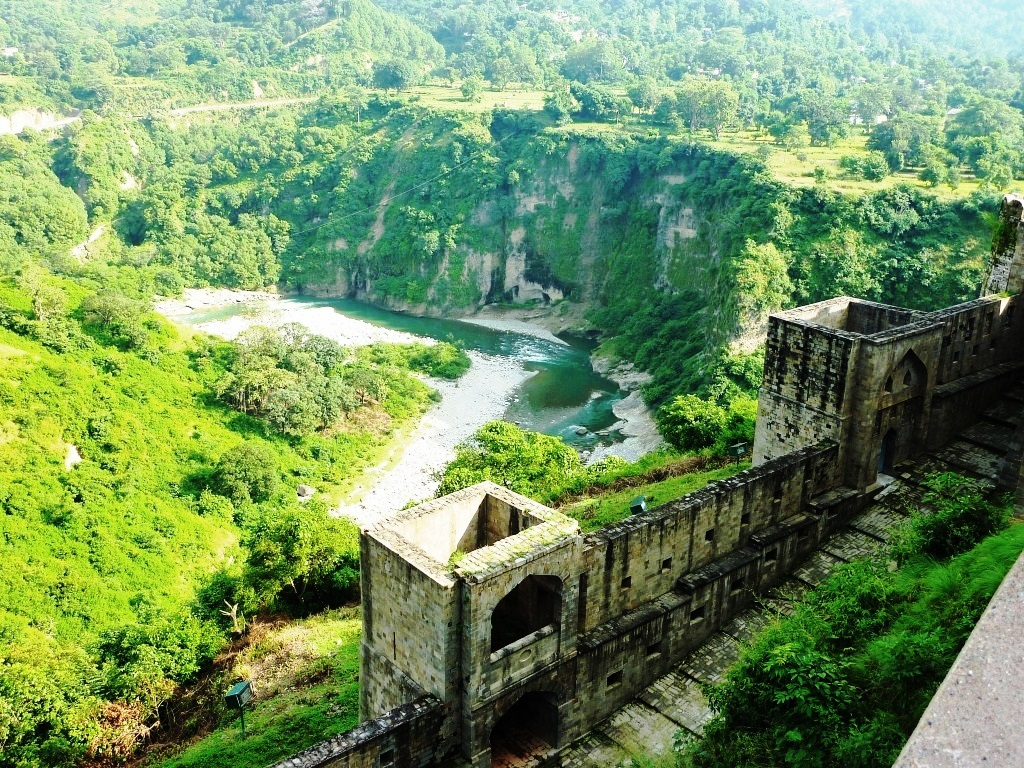
View from top of Kangra Fort overlooking Baner Khad.

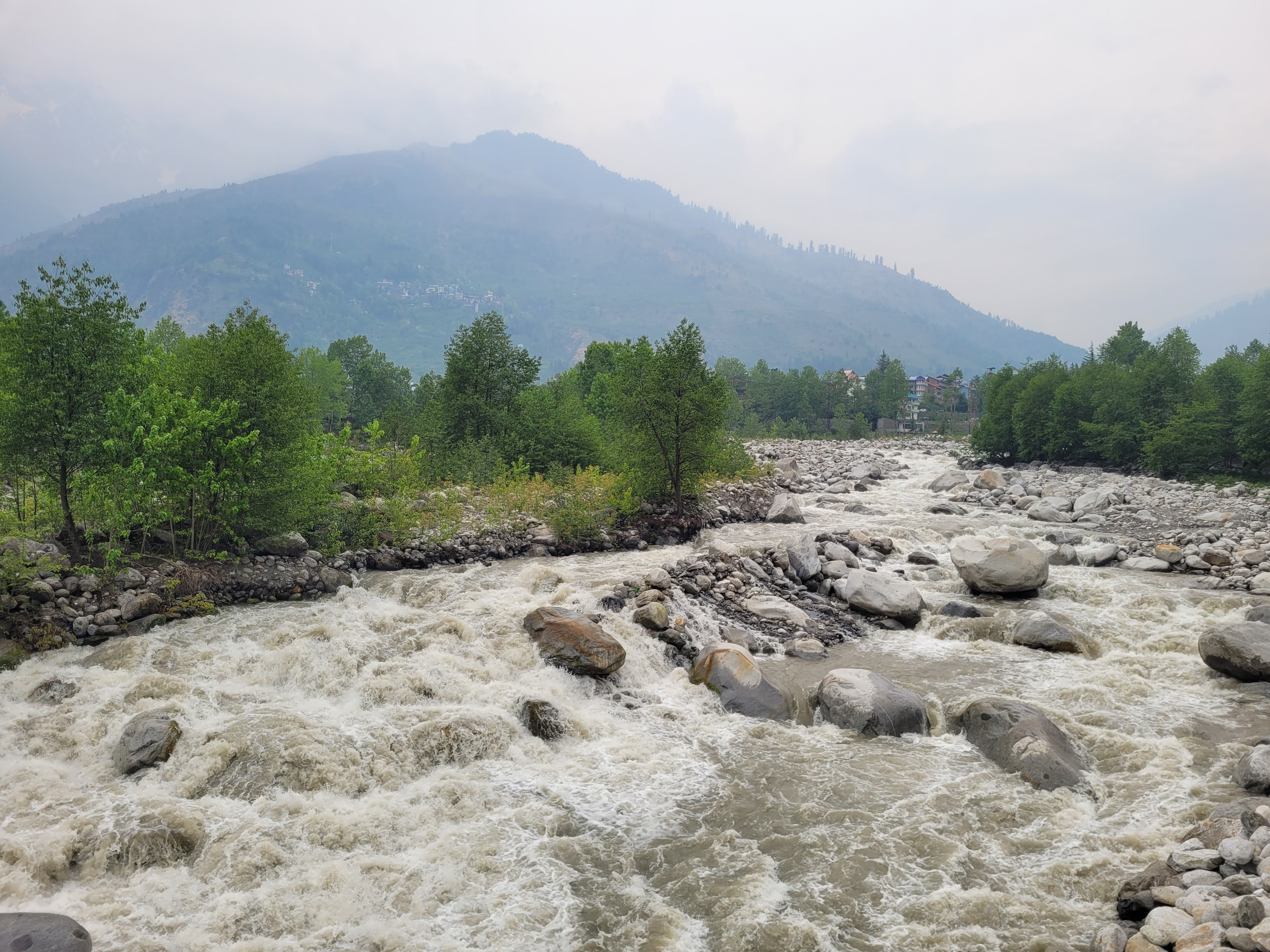
Beas River seen from Nehru Kund, Manali

== See also ==
- Indian Rivers Inter-link
- Inland waterways of India
- Irrigation in India
- Sapta Sindhu
- Indus Waters Treaty
