= Sarkaghat =

- Town
- Nickname: Ghat
- Location in Himachal Pradesh, India Sarkaghat (India)
- Coordinates: 31°41′55″N 76°44′10″E
- Country: India
- State: Himachal Pradesh
- District: Mandi
- Founder: Lala Sansar Chand
- Elevation: 911 m (2,989 ft)

Population (2011)
  - Total: 4,715

Languages
  - Official: Hindi
- Time zone: UTC+5:30 (IST)
- Vehicle registration: HP 28, HP 86

Sarkaghat is a town and a tehsil, near Mandi city in Mandi district of the Indian state of Himachal Pradesh.

Sarkaghat is one of the 5 Local Urban Bodies in Mandi District. The town is located about 60 km away from the district headquarters at Mandi. It is a main business centre and is the fourth-largest town in the district.

The Sarkaghat Local Urban Body came into existence in 1981. The Nagar Parishad of Sarkaghat has seven wards. The new ward of Dabrog was recently included in the Nagar Parishad. The present population of this town is about 6000 and the floating population is about 1 Lakh per month.

The town has a Government Hospital. PPR Memorial Hospital is the only private hospital located in Sarkaghat. The bus station is under the control of Himachal Road Transport Corporation (HRTC).

Sarkaghat has one Govt. P.G. College, one Govt. Hospital, Senior Secondary School, Mini Secretariat in which the various Govt. Department Office of Sub-Division level function.

Sarkaghat also have CBSE affiliated schools, R K International School which is located near the Nabahi Devi Temple. and SPS International School situated in Tatahar.

== Demographics ==
Sarkaghat is a Nagar Parishad town in district of Mandi, Himachal Pradesh. Sarkaghat is divided into seven wards for which elections are held every five years. The Sarkaghat Nagar Parishad has population of 4,715 of which 2,522 are males while 2,193 are females as per report released by Census of India 2011.

The population of children aged 0-6 is 419 which is 8.89% of total population of Sarkaghat (NP). In Sarkaghat Nagar Parishad, the female sex ratio is 870 against state average of 972. Moreover, the child sex ratio in Sarkaghat is around 669 compared to Himachal Pradesh state average of 909. The literacy rate of Sarkaghat city is 89.29% higher than the state average of 82.80%. In Sarkaghat, male literacy is around 92.65% while the female literacy rate is 85.53%.

Sarkaghat Nagar Parishad has total administration over 1,184 houses to which it supplies basic amenities like water and sewerage. It is also authorized to build roads within Nagar Parishad limits and impose taxes on properties coming under its jurisdiction.
