= VNR Vignana Jyothi Institute of Engineering and Technology =

Engineering college in Hyderabad, India

- Official logo of VNR Vignana Jyothi Institute of Engineering and Technology
- Motto: तमसो मा ज्योतिर्गमय॥ (Sanskrit); IAST: Tamasomā Jyotirgamaya (From the darkness, lead me to light )
- Type: Private
- Established: 1995
- Affiliations: NAAC; AICTE; JNTUH
- President: D. Suresh Babu
- Principal: Dr. B Chennakesava Rao
- General Secretary: K. Durgaprasad
- Academic staff: 522
- Students: 6,300
- Undergraduates: 4,320
- Postgraduates: 540
- Other students: 1,440
- Location: Hyderabad, Telangana; 17.5384240°N 78.3850000°E
- Campus: Urban 21 acres (8.5 ha)(Total campus)
- Language: English
- Website: vnrvjiet.ac.in
- Location within India

Vallurupalli Nageswara Rao Vignana Jyothi Institute of Engineering and Technology (VNRVJIET) is a private engineering college in Hyderabad, India recognized by All India Council for Technical Education(AICTE) and affiliated to the Jawaharlal Nehru Technological University, Hyderabad.

Undergraduate programs- CE, EEE, ME, ECE, CSE, EIE and IT in the institute are accredited by the National Board of Accreditation (NBA) New Delhi, since 2008. The institute has Autonomous Status till 2028-2029 A.Y. granted by UGC.

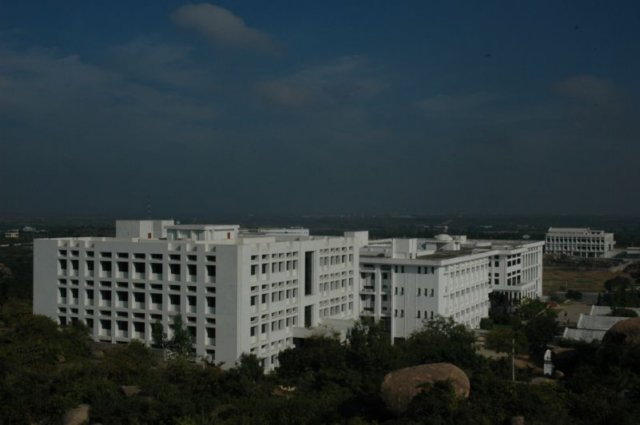
Bird's eye view of VNR VJIET

== Academics ==
=== Rankings ===
According to 2024 NIRF Rankings, VNRVJIET is ranked 151–200 in Engineering Category. As per Sakshi Education this college is ranked in top ten engineering colleges in Hyderabad.

University rankings

Engineering – India
- NIRF (2024): 151-200

==== Undergraduate ====
The minimum qualification for admissions is a pass in intermediate (12th) conducted by Telangana Board of Intermediate Education. Seats are generally filled in two categories namely, A and B. Category A seats are filled in through state level entrance exam, TG EAPCET. Category B seats are filled in through the NRI quota or based on other state or national level entrance exams (JEE Mains). Diploma holders are enrolled into the second year of B.Tech. course to extent of 10% of sanctioned intake based on merit in TG ECET, under lateral entry scheme. The college offers Bachelor of Technology degree programmes in Artificial Intelligence and Data Science, Automobile Engineering, Civil Engineering, Computer Science and Business Systems, Computer Science Engineering, Computer Science Engineering (Artificial Intelligence and Machine Learning), Computer Science Engineering (Cyber Security), Computer Science Engineering (Data Science), Computer Science Engineering (Internet of Things), Electronics and Communication Engineering, Electrical and Electronics Engineering, Electronics and Instrumentation Engineering, Information Technology, and Mechanical Engineering.

== Student life ==
=== Student Clubs ===
The Institute also has number of clubs ranging from Fine Arts (Creative Arts), Music (Crescendo), Theatre (Dramatrix), Dance (Livewire), Classical Dance (Nritya Tarang), Photography (Scintillate), Space club (KAKSYA SASTRA) English Literary Club (Stentorian), Culinary Club (La Culina), Telugu Literary Club (Vignana Jyothi Sahithi Vanam), Filmmaking (VJ Teatro), Social Responsibility Clubs (Art of Living, N Army, Street Cause, VNR Student Force), Robotics Club (AIRBOTS) as well as NSS (National Service Scheme), AR/VR CLUB (XLPOR XR) units.

=== Student Chapters ===
The institute has some active student chapters involved in certain activities. The following are the active student chapters: ACM Student Chapter, IEI Student Chapter, IEEE Student Chapter, ISOI Student Chapter, VSI Student Chapter, CSI Student Chapter, VGLUG Chapter, SAE Club, Fierce Formula India, ISTE Student Forum, IETE Student Forum, ASMS Student Chapter.

Four students of VNR Vignana Jyothi Institute of Engineering and Technology (VNRVJIET) have been named University Innovation Fellows following a six-week training conducted by the Stanford University, USA.

=== Athletics ===
The institute has a sports complex for use of students. It features a hardwood court for playing basketball or badminton, dedicated rooms for table tennis, cue sports, carroms, chess, gym with showers and locker (cabinet). The college is equipped with a common football and cricket ground, a basketball court, volleyball court. The institute students have won many national events. The college sports department conducts national level sports fest every year.

== Controversies ==
2014 Beas River disaster refers to the 8 June 2014 drowning of 24 second-year engineering students (six female and 18 male) and one tour operator from V.N.R. Vignana Jyothi Institute of Engineering and Technology of Hyderabad at the Beas River in Himachal Pradesh. The accident took place in the Thalout area (Shalanala Village) of Mandi district and was the result of a sudden surge of river water released upstream from the Larji hydro electric project.
