= Narbadeshwar Temple =

Coordinates: 31°50′13″N 76°30′17″E

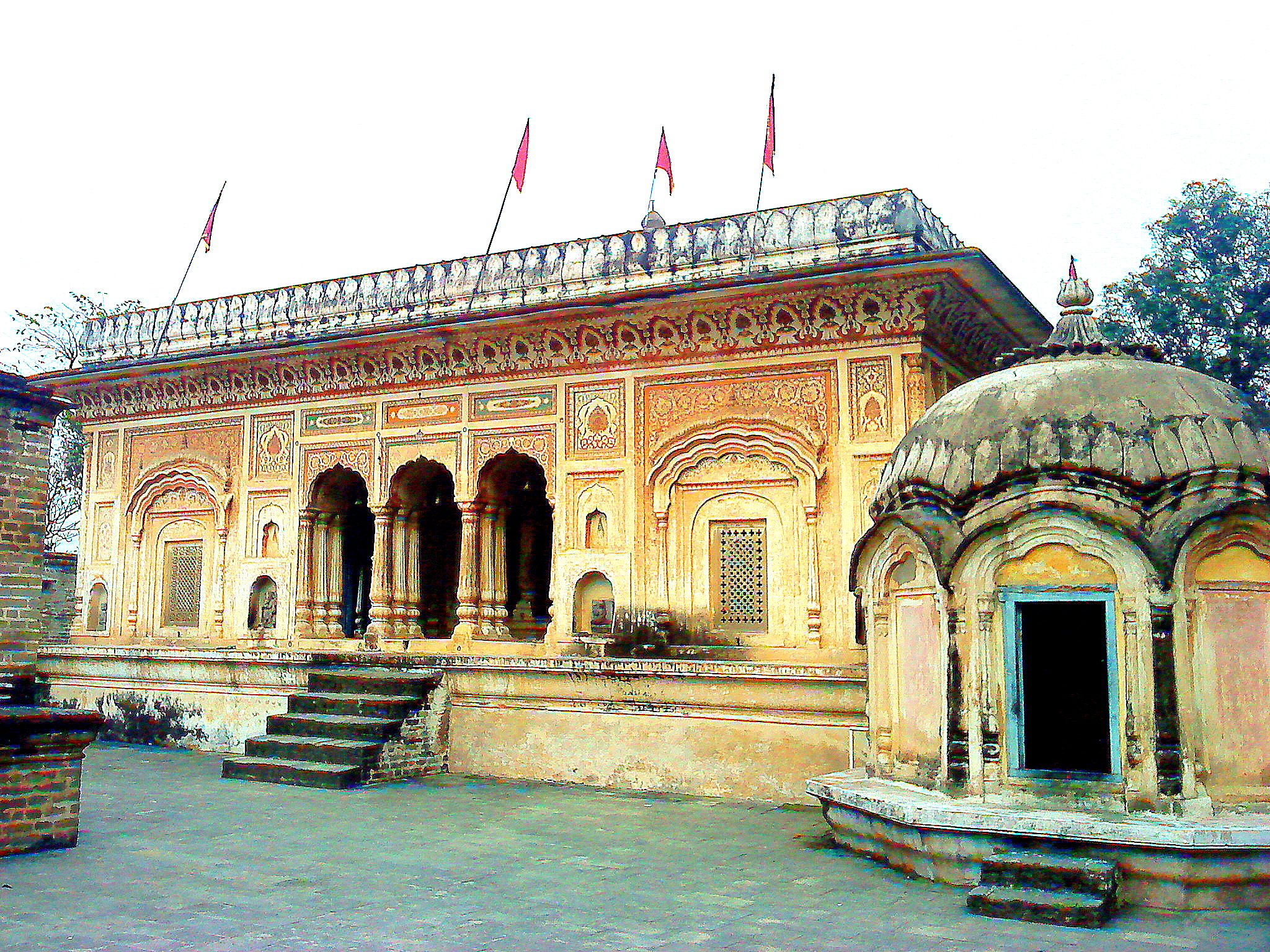
Narbadeshwar Temple in Himachal Pradesh

The Narbadeshwar Temple, located in the Sujanpur Tira area of Hamirpur district in India, is dedicated to Lord Shiva.

The temple was built by Maharani Pransani Devi (wife of Sansar Chand Katoch) in 1802. The temple is built in Panchayatan style with walls having paintings depicting scenes from the Mahabharata and the Ramayana.

== Gallery ==
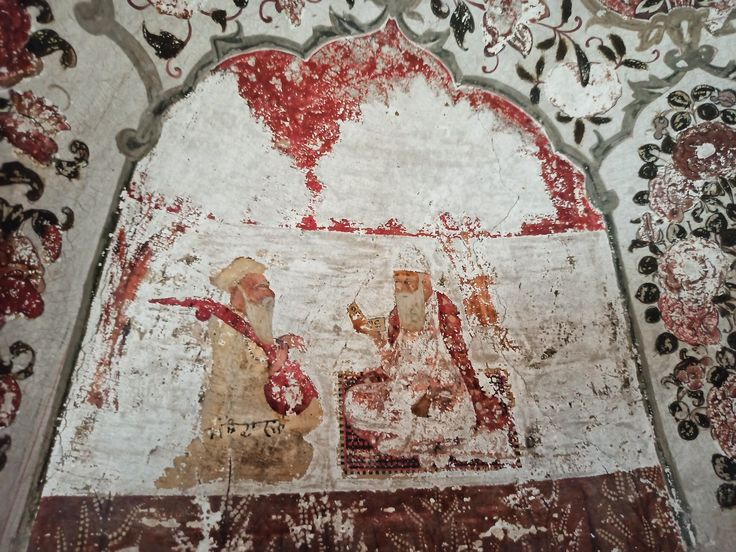
Guru Nanak and Bhai Mardana

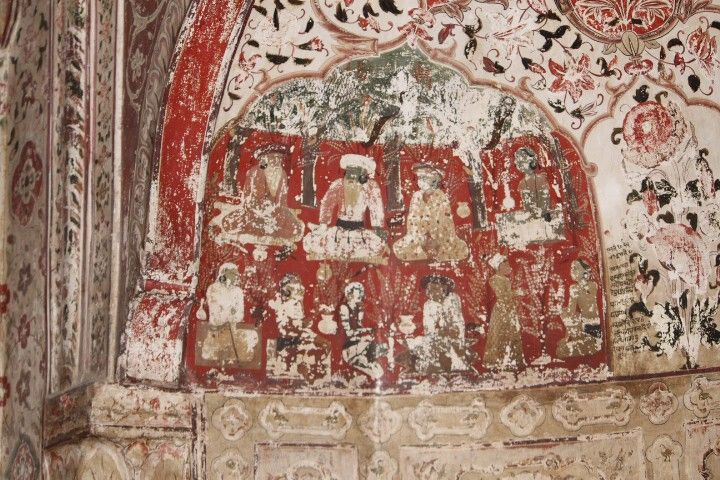
Possibly the Sikh gurus

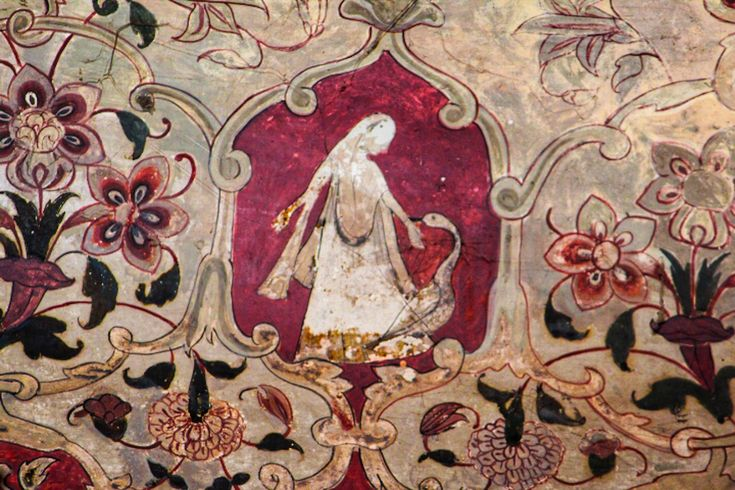
Hansika

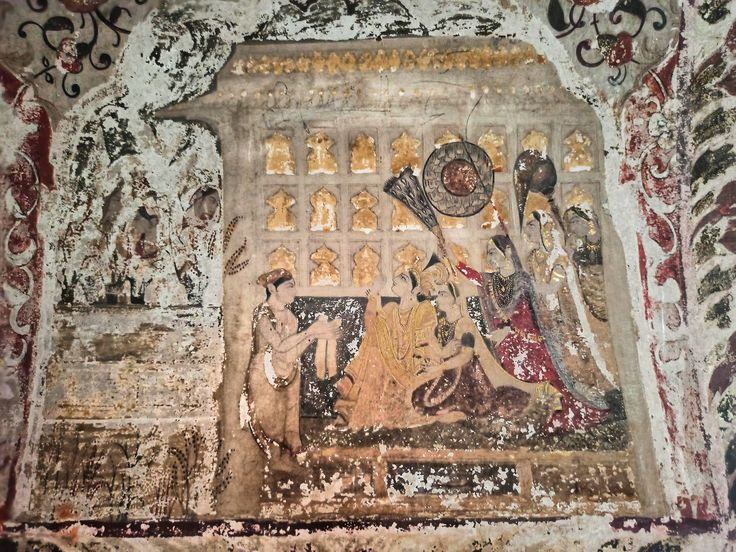
Sudama visiting Krishna,

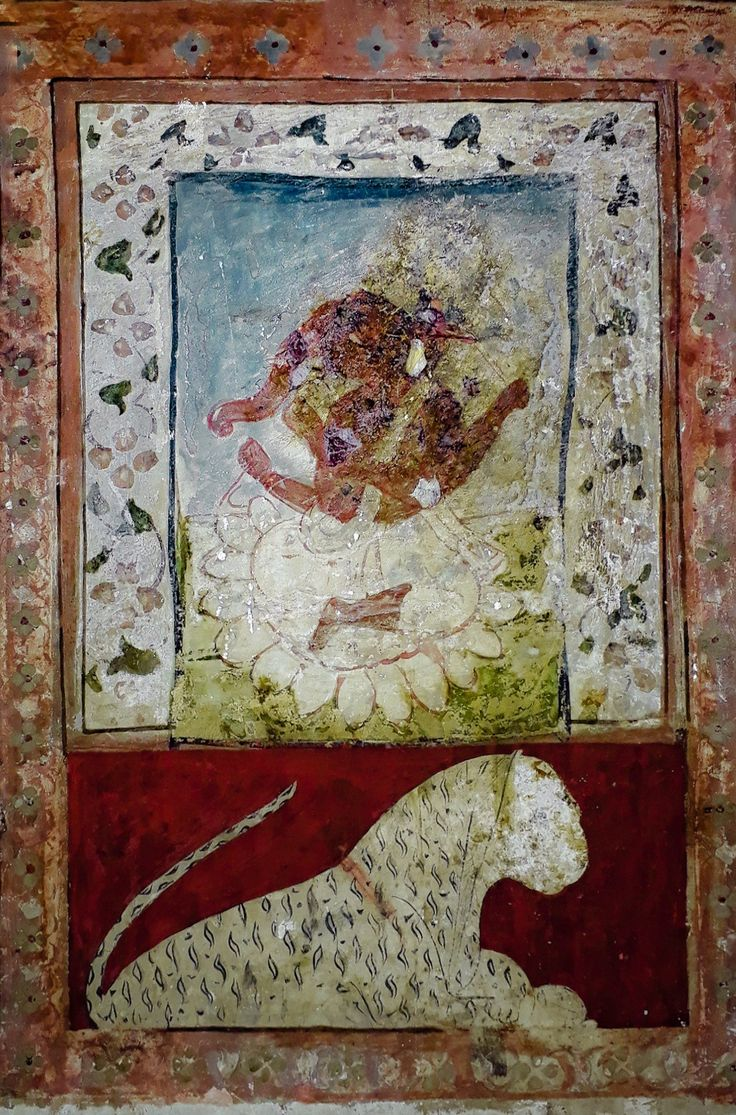
Ganesha

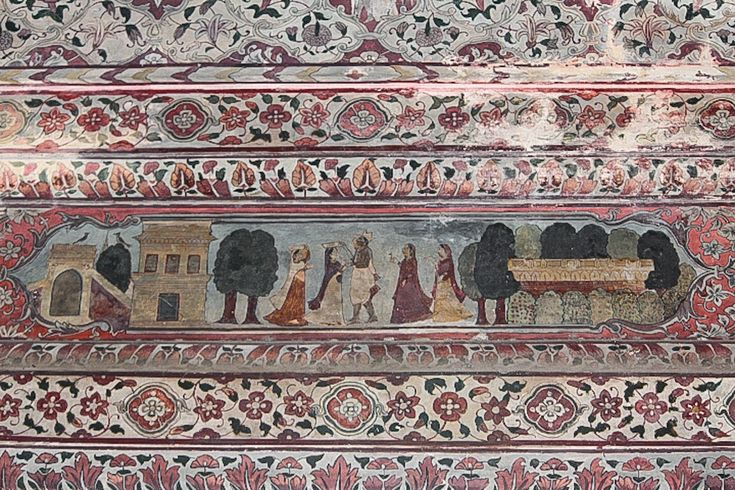
Krishna with Gopis
