= Kaul Singh Thakur =

Indian politician

Member of the Himachal Pradesh Legislative Assembly
- In office 1993–2017
- Succeeded by: Jawahar Thakur
- Constituency: Darang
- In office 1977–1990
- Constituency: Darang

Personal details
- Born: 23 November 1945 (age 80) Sambal, Punjab, British India
- Party: Indian National Congress
- Spouse(s): Chinta Thakur, Padma Thakur
- Children: 4
- Occupation: Politician, advocate and horticulturist.
- Profession: Politician

Kaul Singh Thakur (born 23 November 1945) was the Health and Family Welfare minister in Himachal Pradesh Cabinet until December, 2017. He has also served as the Himachal Pradesh Congress President two times.

He has also served as the PCC president a second time in a row, despite strong opposition from leaders such as Virbhadra Singh and Vidya Stokes. He was also looked upon by many as a potential chief ministerial candidate for the 2012 Himachal Vidhan Sabha elections.

== Early life ==
Thakur was born on 23 November 1945 in Mandi district to Shri Laxman Singh Thakur. He was educated at Punjab University, Chandigarh. He is married to Chinta Thakur and they have one son and three daughters.
