= Mandi district =

District in Himachal Pradesh, India

- District of Himachal Pradesh
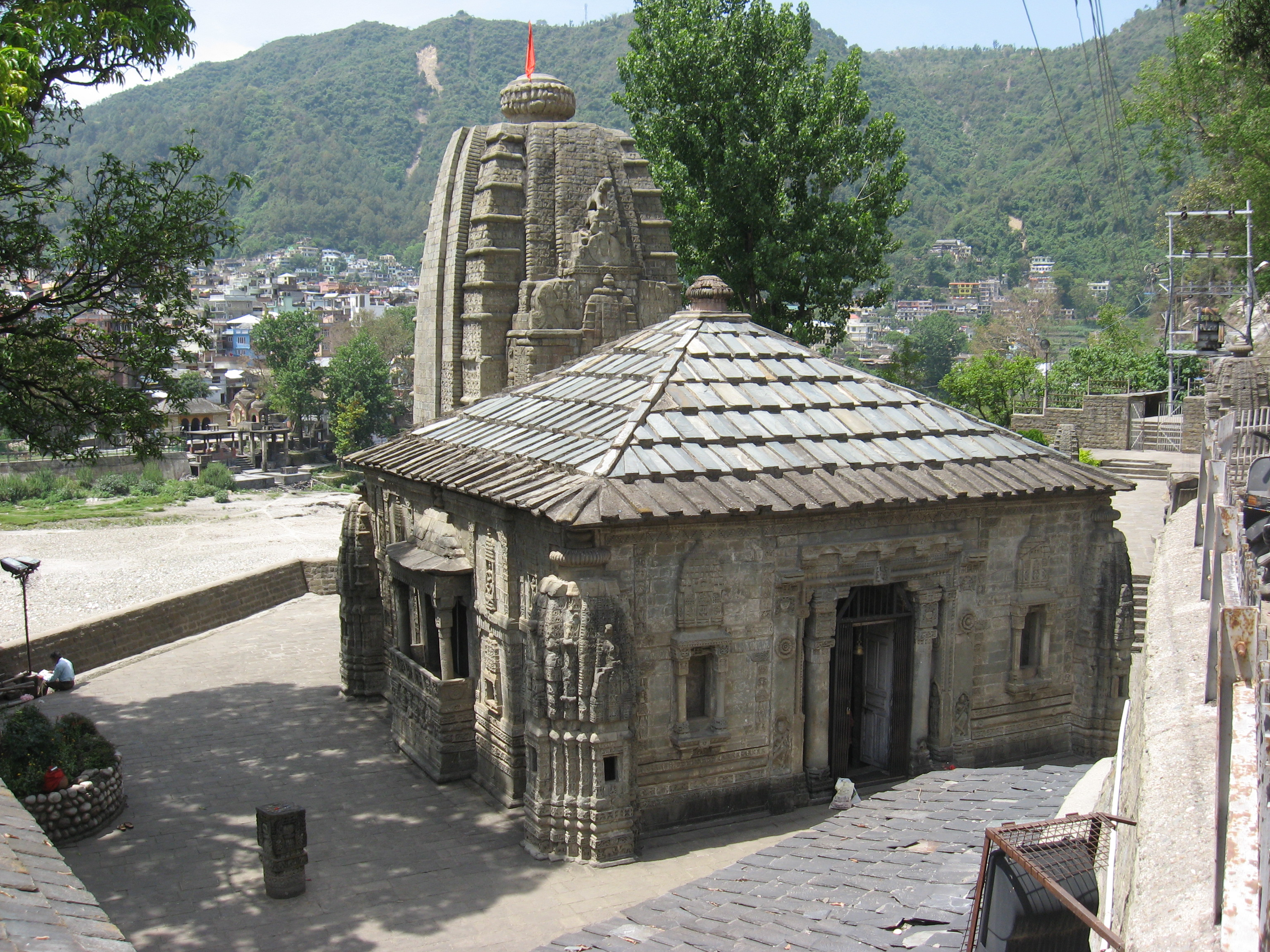
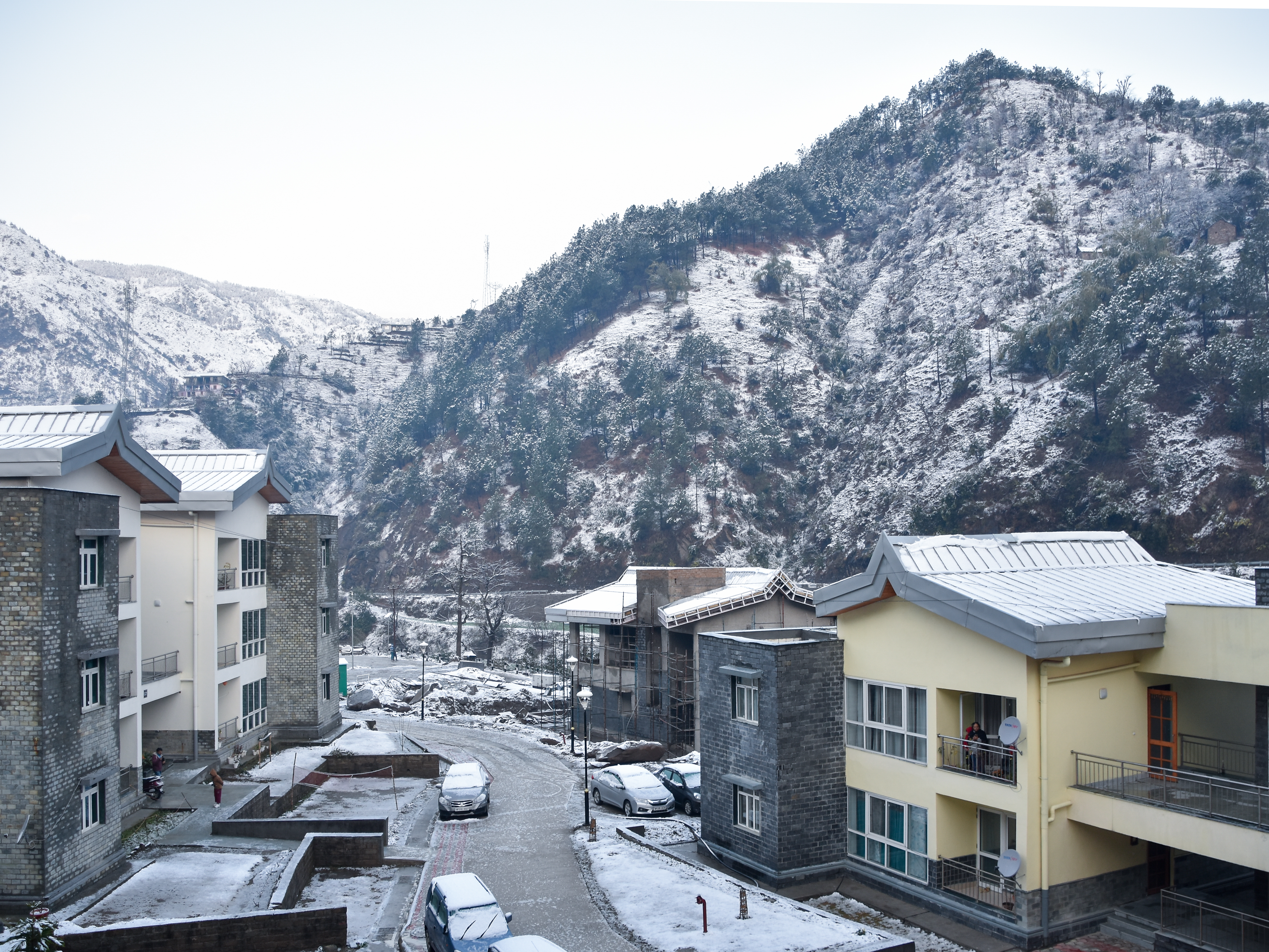
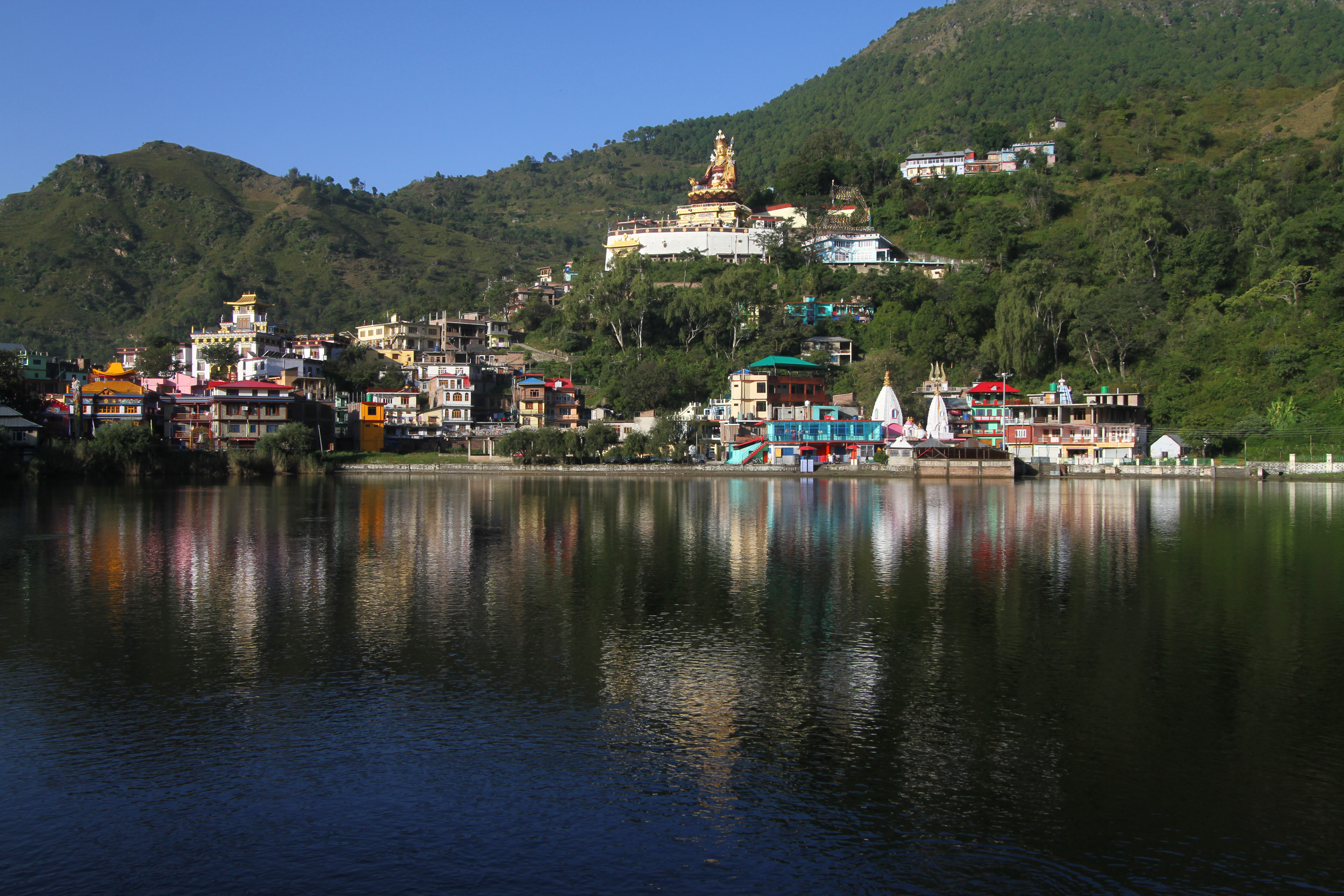
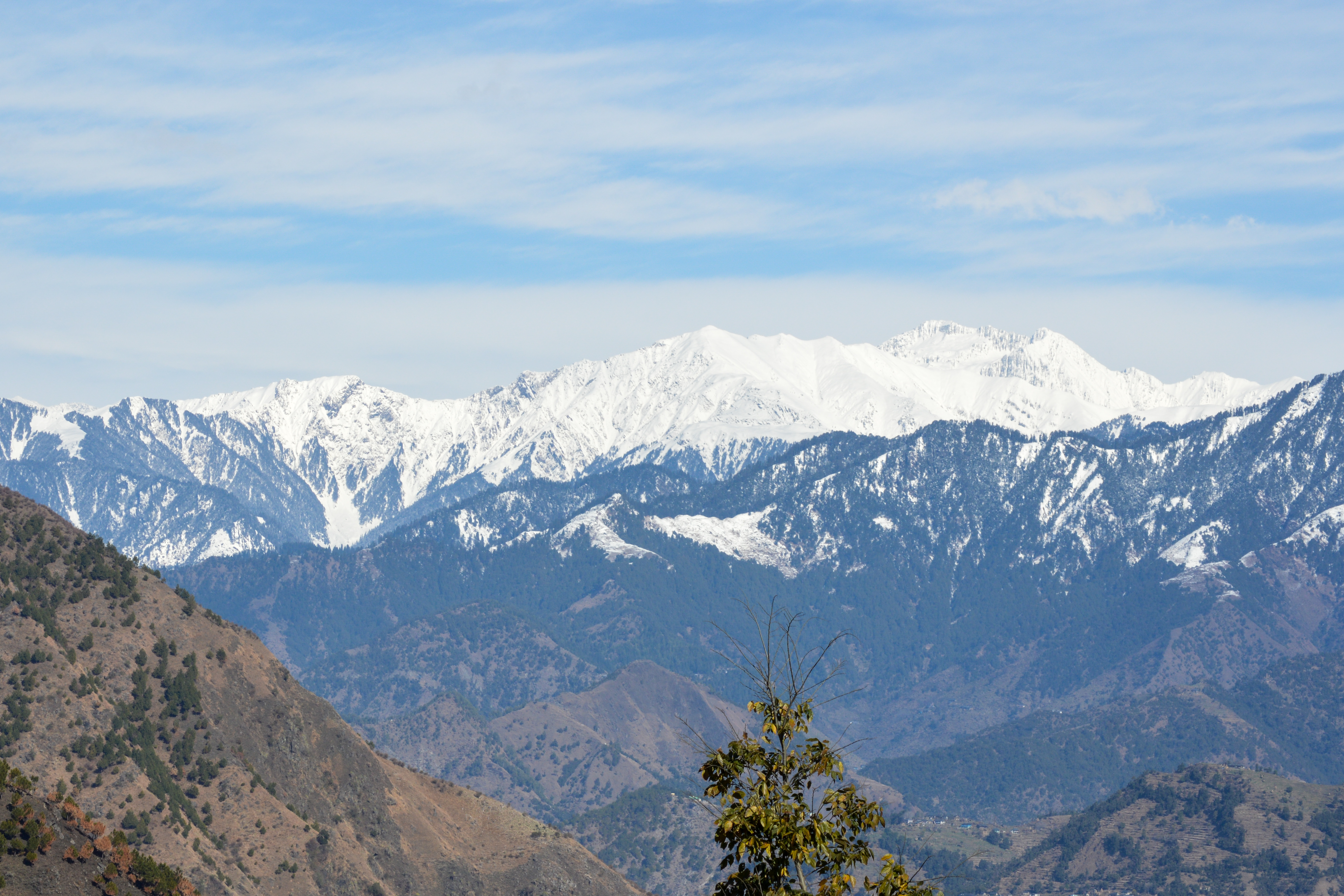
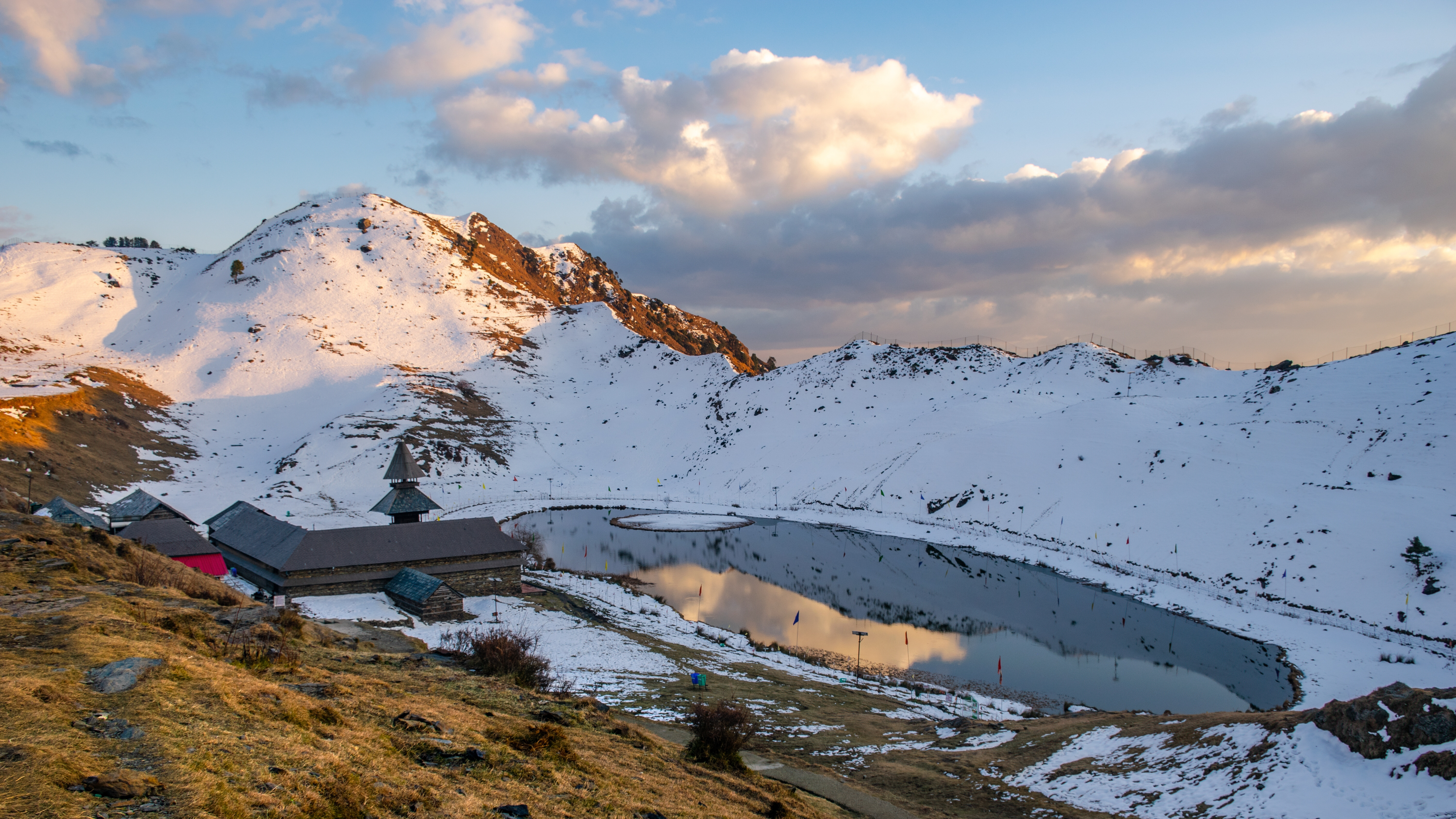
- Clockwise from top-left: Triloknath temple, IIT Mandi, view of Nargu Wildlife Sanctuary, Prashar Lake, Rewalsar Lake

- Location in Himachal Pradesh
- Country: India
- State: Himachal Pradesh
- Headquarters: Mandi

Area
  - Total: 3,951 km^{2} (1,525 sq mi)

Population (2011)
  - Total: 999,777
  - Density: 253.0/km^{2} (655.4/sq mi)

Languages
  - Official: Hindi
  - Regional: Mandeali; Mahasui
- Time zone: UTC+05:30 (IST)
- Major highways: NH 3, NH 154
- Website: http://hpmandi.nic.in/

Mandi district is one of the central districts of Himachal Pradesh state in northern India. The town of Mandi is the headquarters of the district.

The main native language is Mandeali.

As of 2011, it is the second most populous district of Himachal Pradesh (out of 12), after Kangra. The upper areas of Mandi district are part of the geographical, historical and cultural Mahasu region.

== Demographics ==
=== Population ===
Historical population
Year	Pop.	±% p.a.
1901	228,721	—
1911	236,038	+0.32%
1921	239,376	+0.14%
1931	265,873	+1.06%
1941	303,685	+1.34%
1951	310,626	+0.23%
1961	384,259	+2.15%
1971	515,180	+2.98%
1981	644,827	+2.27%
1991	776,372	+1.87%
2001	901,344	+1.50%
2011	999,777	+1.04%

According to the 2011 census, Mandi district has a population of 999,777 roughly equal to the nation of Fiji or the US state of Montana. This gives it a ranking of 446th in India (out of a total of 640). The district has a population density of 253 inhabitants per square kilometre (660/sq mi).

Its population growth rate over the decade 2001-2011 was 10.89%. Mandi has a sex ratio of 1012 females for every 1000 males and a literacy rate of 82.81%. 6.27% of the population lives in urban areas. Scheduled Castes and Scheduled Tribes make up 29.38% and 1.28% of the population respectively.

=== Religion ===
Religions in Mandi district (2011)
Religion	Percent
Hinduism	98.16%
Islam	0.95%
Sikhism	0.41%
Other or not stated	0.48%

Religious groups in Mandi State (British Punjab province era)
Religious group	1901		1911		1921		1931		1941	
Religious group	Pop.	%	Pop.	%	Pop.	%	Pop.	%	Pop.	%
Hinduism (Note: 1931-1941: Including Ad-Dharmis)	170,304	97.85%	178,115	98.35%	181,358	98.01%	199,935	96.37%	227,463	97.79%
Islam	3,187	1.83%	2,799	1.55%	3,462	1.87%	6,351	3.06%	4,328	1.86%
Buddhism	510	0.29%	164	0.09%	76	0.04%	138	0.07%	208	0.09%
Sikhism	41	0.02%	26	0.01%	142	0.08%	899	0.43%	583	0.25%
Christianity	3	0%	4	0%	10	0.01%	141	0.07%	11	0%
Jainism	0	0%	2	0%	0	0%	0	0%	0	0%
Judaism	0	0%	0	0%	0	0%	1	0%	0	0%
Zoroastrianism	0	0%	0	0%	0	0%	0	0%	0	0%
Others	0	0%	0	0%	0	0%	0	0%	0	0%
Total population	174,045	100%	181,110	100%	185,048	100%	207,465	100%	232,593	100%
Note: British Punjab province era district borders are not an exact match in the present-day due to various bifurcations to district borders — which since created new districts — throughout the historic Punjab Province region during the post-independence era that have taken into account population increases.

=== Language ===
Languages of Mandi district (2011)
1. Mandeali (59.1%)
2. Pahadi (33.3%)
3. Hindi (4.10%)
4. Others (3.47%)

At the 2011 census, 59.11% of the population in the district identified their first language as Mandeali, 33.32% opted for Pahari (a term broadly applicable to most Indo-Aryan languages of Himachal and Uttarakhand), while 4.1% chose Hindi, 0.66% – Punjabi and 0.47% – Kangri.

== Subdivisions ==
Mandi district is divided into 12 subdivisions:

- Mandi Sadar
- Balh
- Sundar Nagar
- Sarkaghat
- Dharampur
- Joginder Nagar
- Padhar
- Gohar
- Thunag
- Karsog
- Balichoki
- Kotli

Villages in the district include Janjheli, which falls in Thunag Tehsil. It is near Kullu-Manali, around 80 km from Bhunter Airport, 90 km from Kullu and 67 km from Mandi. It has thick deodar forests, sprawling apple orchards, and springs. It is a trekking/hiking outpost. Shikari Devi is a tourist spot. It hosts Himachal Cultural Village, an ethnic village highlighting the culture of Himachal Pradesh.

== Politics ==
No.	Constituency	Member	Party	Remarks	Reference
26	Karsog (SC)	Hira Lal	Bhartiya Janata Party		
27	Sundernagar	Rakesh Jamwal	Bhartiya Janata Party		
28	Nachan (SC)	Vinod Kumar	Bharatiya Janata Party		
29	Seraj	Jai Ram Thakur	Bharatiya Janata Party	Chief Minister	
30	Darang	Jawahar Thakur	Bharatiya Janata Party		
31	Jogindernagar	Prakash Rana	Bharatiya Janata Party	Defected From Independent To BJP	
32	Dharampur	Mahender Singh	Bharatiya Janata Party	Jal Shakti Minister	
33	Mandi	Anil Sharma	Bharatiya Janata Party	MPP and Power Minister (27.12.2017–13.04.2019)	
34	Balh (SC)	Inder Singh	Bharatiya Janata Party		
35	Sarkaghat	Inder Singh	Bharatiya Janata Party	Chairman, Subordinate Legislation Committee	

== Education ==
=== Universities and colleges ===
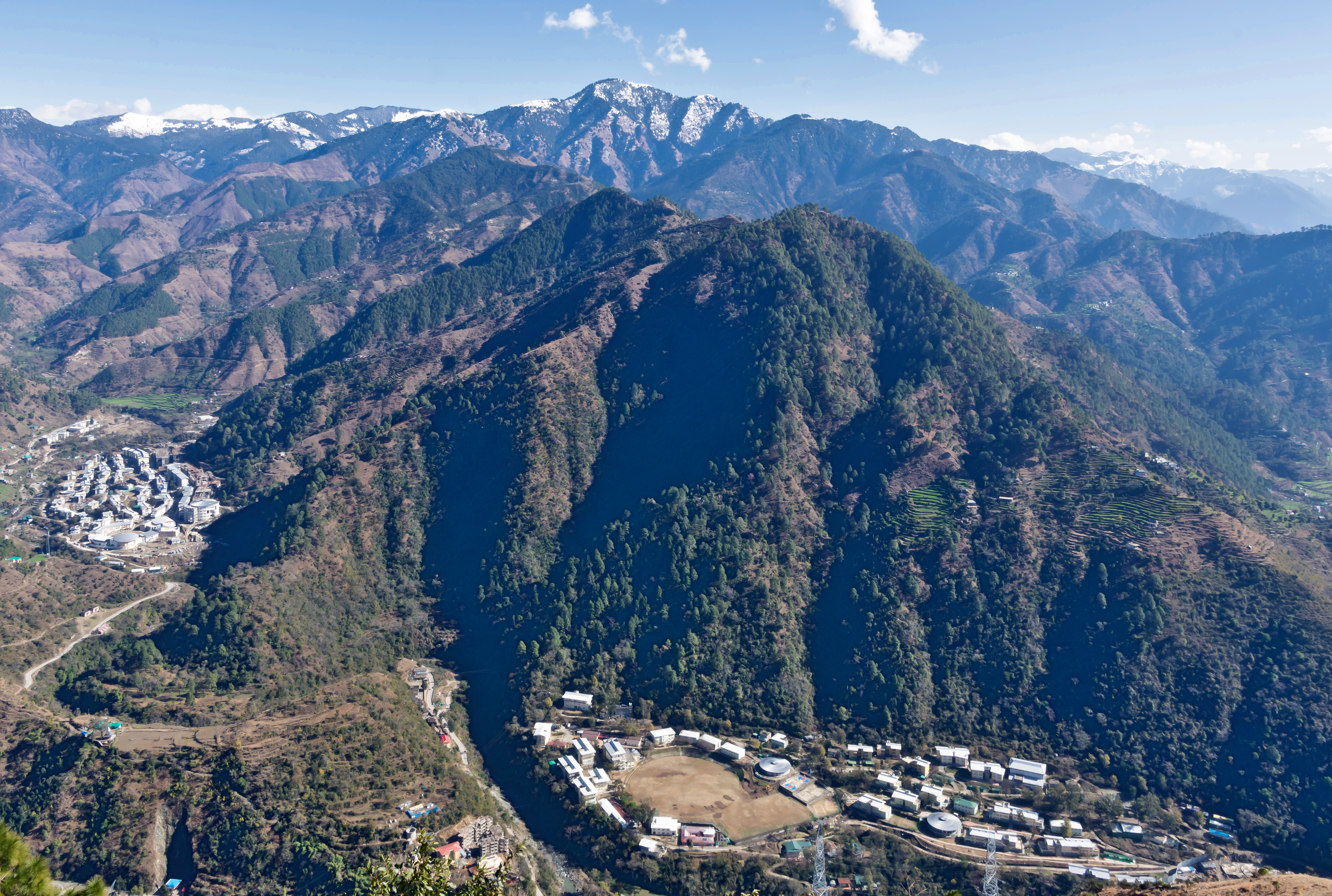
IIT Mandi Campus Jan 2020

- Indian Institute of Technology Mandi (IIT Mandi)
- Jawaharlal Nehru Government Engineering College
- Sardar Vallabhbhai Patel Cluster University
- Shri Lal Bahadur Shastri Government Medical College & Hospital Mandi
- College of Horticulture and Centre of Excellence for Horticulture Research and Extension, Thunag
- Atal Bihari Vajpayee University of Medicine and Health Sciences (upcoming)

=== Schools ===
- Jawahar Navodaya Vidyalaya, Mandi

=== Polytechnics ===
- Govt Polytechnic Sundernagar
- Industrial Training Institute (ITI) Mandi

== Sports ==
The district is home to the Bandy Federation of India which is a member of the IOC recognized Federation of International Bandy.

== See also ==
- Mandi State
- Mandi River
- Jaidevi
