= Himachal Pradesh Congress Committee =

- President: Vinay Kumar
- Chairman: Sukhvinder Singh Sukhu (Chief Minister)
- Headquarters: Rajiv Bhawan, Near HPTDC, Shimla-171001, Himachal Pradesh
- Youth wing: Himachal Pradesh Youth Congress
- Women's wing: Himachal Pradesh Mahila Congress Committee
- Ideology: Populism; Social liberalism; Democratic socialism; Social democracy; Secularism
- ECI status: A State Unit of Indian National Congress
- Alliance: Indian National Developmental Inclusive Alliance
- Seats in Rajya Sabha: 1 / 3
- Seats in Lok Sabha: 0 / 4
- Seats in Himachal Pradesh Legislative Assembly: 40 / 68

Election symbol

Himachal Pradesh Congress Committee (HPCC or Himachal PCC) is the state unit of the Indian National Congress, working in the state of Himachal Pradesh. It is responsible for organizing and coordinating the party's activities and campaigns within the state, as well as selecting candidates for local, state, and national elections. The current president of the HPCC is Vinay Kumar. Y. S. Parmar, Ram Lal Thakur and Virbhadra Singh from Congress represented the state since 1951. Its head office is situated at Rajiv Bhawan in Shimla. Vinay Kumar is the current president.

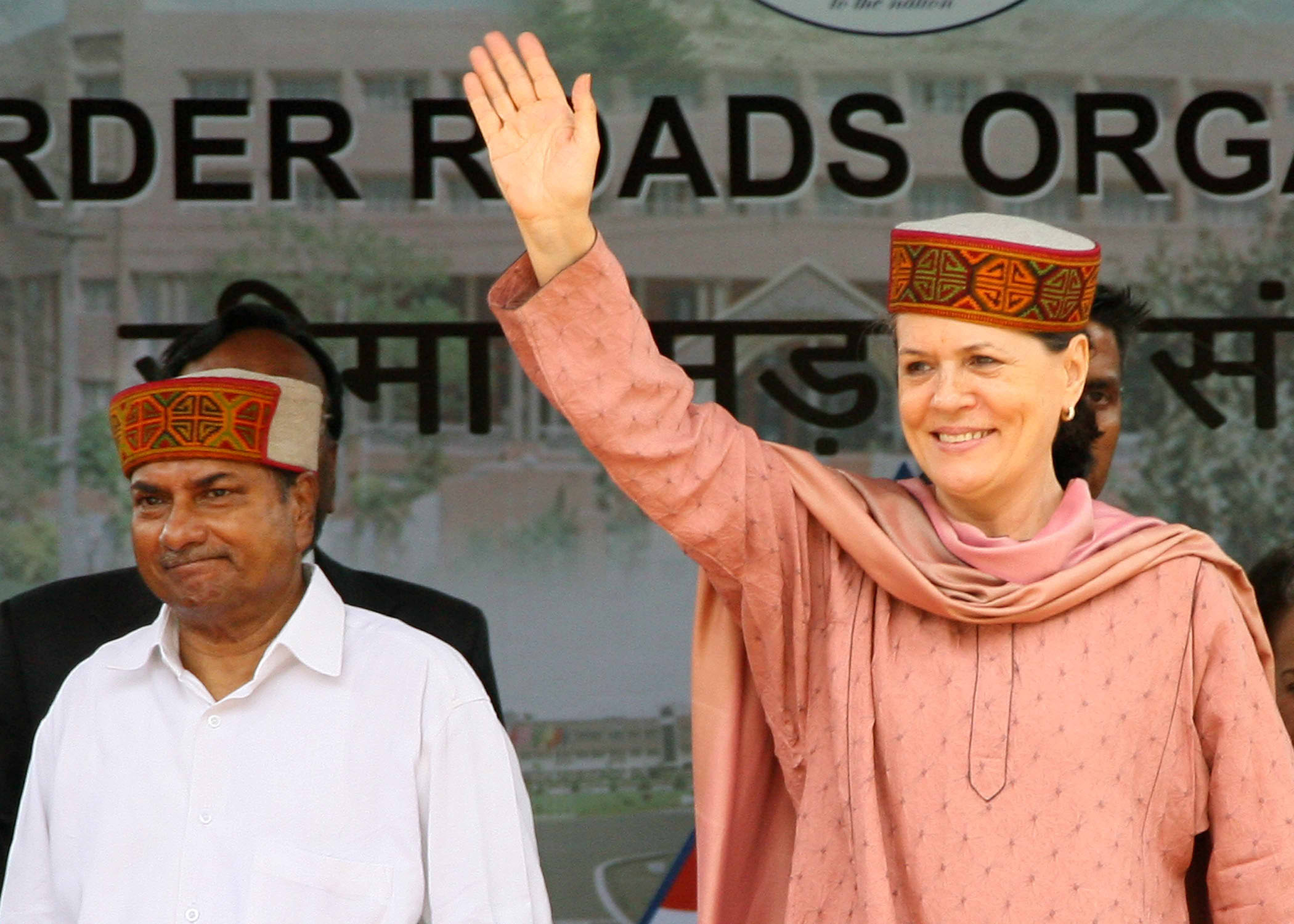
Smt. Sonia Gandhi and the Shri A. K. Antony at the foundation stone laying ceremony of the Rohtang Tunnel Project, in Manali, Himachal Pradesh on June 28, 2010

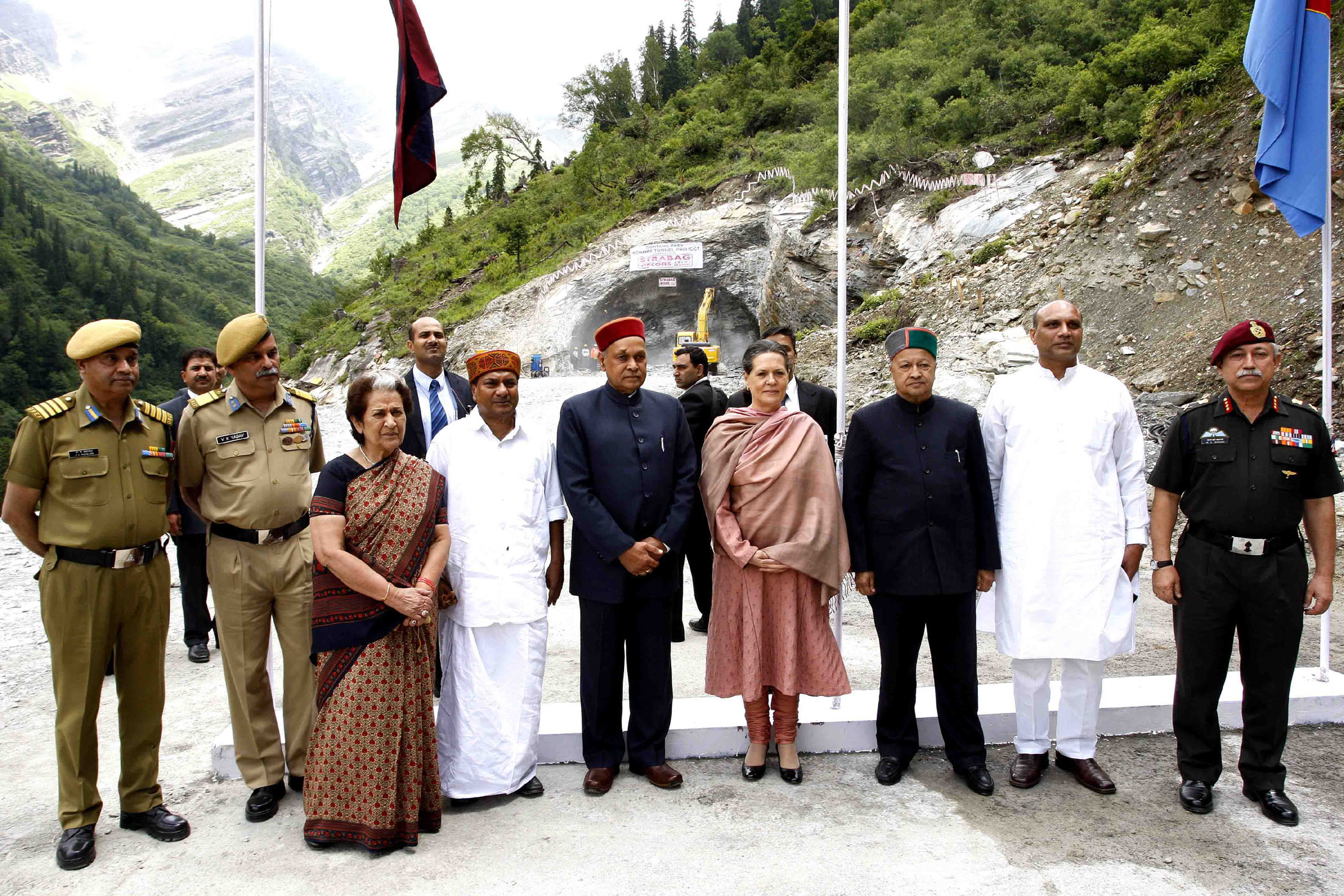
The Chairperson, National Advisory Council, Smt. Sonia Gandhi laid the foundation stone for the Rohtang Tunnel Project, in Manali, Himachal Pradesh on June 28, 2010

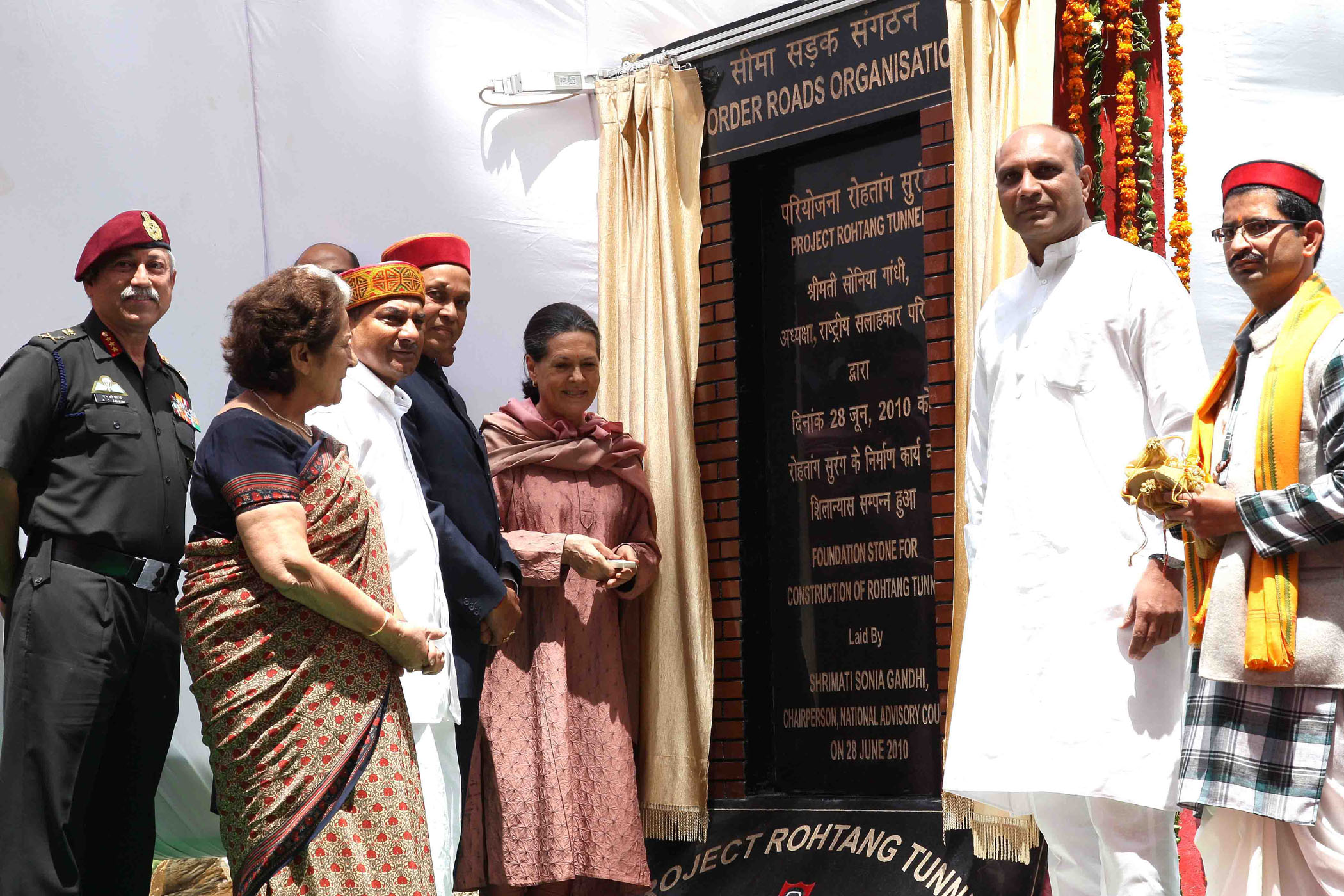
The Chairperson, National Advisory Council, Smt. Sonia Gandhi laid the foundation stone for the Rohtang Tunnel Project, in Manali, Himachal Pradesh

== Structure & Composition ==
S.no	Name	Designation
1.	Rajani Patil	AICC Incharge
2.	Vinay Kumar	President; Himachal Pradesh Congress Committee
3.	Zainab Chandel	President; Himachal Pradesh Mahila Congress
4.	Nigam Bhandari	President; Himachal Pradesh Youth Congress
5.	Chatter Singh Thakur	President; Himachal Pradesh NSUI
6.	Sukhvinder Singh Sukhu	CLP Leader; Himachal Pradesh Legislative Assembly

== List of presidents ==
S.no	Name	Portrait	Term	
1.	Yashwant Singh Parmar		1948	1950
(1).	Yashwant Singh Parmar		1960	1963
2.	Satyavati Dang		1964	1969
3.	Sat Mahajan		1972	1977
4.	Virbhadra Singh		1977	1980
5.	Krishan Dutt Sultanpuri		1984	1987
6.	Sant Ram Sharma		1987	1989
(4).	Virbhadra Singh		1989	1990
7.	Ram Lal Thakur		1990	1993
(3)	Sat Mahajan		1993	1995
(4).	Virbhadra Singh		1995	2003
8.	Vidya Stokes		2003	2006
9.	Viplove Thakur		2006	2008
10.	Kaul Singh Thakur		2008	2012
(4).	Virbhadra Singh		2012	2013
11.	Sukhvinder Singh Sukhu		2013	2019
12.	Kuldeep Singh Rathore		2019	2022
13.	Pratibha Singh		2022	2025
14.	Vinay Kumar		2025	Incumbent

== List of chief ministers of Himachal Pradesh from Indian National Congress(1963–present) ==
The Chief Commissioner's Province of Himachal Pradesh was formed on 15 April 1948 through integration of 30 erstwhile princely-states. In 1951, Himachal Pradesh become a Part C state, under the Government of Part C State, 1951 and was brought under a Lt. Governor with 36-member Legislative Assembly. First elections to the Assembly were held in 1952. The Indian National Congress won 24 seats to form a government under Yashwant Singh Parmar.

In 1954, Bilaspur, another part-C State, was merged with Himachal Pradesh. In 1956 it was made a Union Territory and was placed under a Lt. Governor with a Territorial Council with limited powers. In 1963, Himachal Pradesh, though being a Union Territory, was provided with a Legislative Assembly. The Territorial Council was converted into the Legislative Assembly of the Union Territory. The assembly has its first sitting on 1 October 1971. On 18 December 1970 the State of Himachal Pradesh Act was passed by Parliament and the new state came into being on 25 January 1971 as the 18th state of the Indian Union.

No (Note: A number inside brackets indicates that the incumbent has previously held office.)	Portrait	Name	Constituency	Term of office			Assembly (election)	Ref
No	Portrait	Name	Constituency	From	To	Days in office	Assembly (election)	Ref
1.		Yashwant Singh Parmar	Pacchad	8 March 1952	31 October 1956	18 years, 30 days	1st (1952 election)	
1.		Yashwant Singh Parmar	Renuka	1 July 1963	4 March 1967	18 years, 30 days	1st (Territorial Council)	
1.		Yashwant Singh Parmar	Renuka	4 March 1967	25 January 1971	18 years, 30 days		
1.		Yashwant Singh Parmar	Renuka	25 January 1971	10 March 1972	18 years, 30 days	2nd (1967 election)	
1.		Yashwant Singh Parmar	Renuka	10 March 1972	28 January 1977	18 years, 30 days	3rd (1972 election)	
2.		Thakur Ram Lal	Jubbal Kotkhai	28 January 1977	30 April 1977	3 years,144 days	3rd (1972 election)	
2.		Thakur Ram Lal	Jubbal Kotkhai	14 February 1980	15 June 1982	3 years,144 days	4th (1977 election)	
2.		Thakur Ram Lal	Jubbal Kotkhai	15 June 1982	7 April 1983	3 years,144 days	5th (1982 election)	
3.		Virbhadra Singh	Jubbal Kotkhai	8 April 1983	8 March 1985	21 years. 11 days	5th (1982 election)	
3.		Virbhadra Singh	Jubbal Kotkhai	8 March 1985	5 March 1990	21 years. 11 days	6th (1985 elections)	
3.		Virbhadra Singh	Rohru	3 December 1993	23 March 1998	21 years. 11 days	8th (1993 elections)	
3.		Virbhadra Singh	Rohru	6 March 2003	30 December 2007	21 years. 11 days	10th (2003 elections)	
3.		Virbhadra Singh	Shimla Rural	25 December 2012	27 December 2017	21 years. 11 days	12th (2012 elections)	
4.		Sukhvinder Singh Sukhu	Nadaun	11 December 2022	Till Date		14th _{(2022 elections)}	

== List of Current Members of the Himachal Legislative Assembly ==
Constituency		Electors (2022)	Party	MLA
No.	Name	Electors (2022)	Party	MLA
Chamba
3	Chamba	81,594	INC	Neeraj Nayar
5	Bhattiyat	78,980	INC	Kuldeep Singh Pathania
Kangra
7	Indora (SC)	91,569	INC	Malender Rajan
8	Fatehpur	87,913	INC	Bhawani Singh Pathania
9	Jawali	99,572	INC	Chander Kumar
12	Jawalamukhi	78,144	INC	Sanjay Rattan
13	Jaisinghpur (SC)	84,018	INC	Yadvinder Goma
15	Nagrota	88,867	INC	Raghubir Singh Bali
17	Shahpur	87,723	INC	Kewal Singh Pathania
19	Palampur	75,481	INC	Ashish Butail
20	Baijnath (SC)	89,135	INC	Kishori Lal
Lahaul and Spiti
21	Lahaul and Spiti (ST)	24,876	INC	Anuradha Rana
Kullu
22	Manali	73,488	INC	Bhuvneshwar Gaur
23	Kullu	89,600	INC	Sunder Singh Thakur
Mandi
32	Dharampur	79,958	INC	Chander Shekhar
Hamirpur
36	Bhoranj (SC)	81,134	INC	Suresh Kumar
37	Sujanpur	73,922	INC	Captain Ranjit Singh
40	Nadaun	93,107	INC	Sukhvinder Singh Sukhu
Una
41	Chintpurni (SC)	82,686	INC	Sudarshan Singh Babloo
42	Gagret	82,774	INC	Rakesh Kalia
43	Haroli	86,273	INC	Mukesh Agnihotri
45	Kutlehar	85,163	INC	Vivek Sharma
Bilaspur
47	Ghumarwin	88,527	INC	Rajesh Dharmani
Solan
50	Arki	93,852	INC	Sanjay Awasthy
52	Doon	68,266	INC	Ram Kumar Chaudhary
53	Solan (SC)	85,238	INC	Dhani Ram Shandil
54	Kasauli (SC)	67,434	INC	Vinod Sultanpuri
Sirmaur
56	Nahan	83,561	INC	Ajay Solanki
57	Sri Renukaji (SC)	72,961	INC	Vinay Kumar
59	Shillai	74,831	INC	Harshwardhan Chauhan
Shimla
61	Theog	83,275	INC	Kuldeep Singh Rathore
62	Kasumpti	65,713	INC	Anirudh Singh
63	Shimla	48,071	INC	Harish Janartha
64	Shimla Rural	76,267	INC	Vikramaditya Singh
65	Jubbal-Kotkhai	71,566	INC	Rohit Thakur
66	Rampur (SC)	74,838	INC	Nand Lal
67	Rohru (SC)	73,580	INC	Mohan Lal Brakta
Kinnaur
68	Kinnaur (ST)	58,836	INC	Jagat Singh Negi

== List of all Rajya Sabha members of Himachal Pradesh from Indian National Congress ==
Name	Date of appointment	Date of retirement	Term
C L Varma	03/04/1952	02/04/1958	1
C L Varma	03/04/1964	02/04/1970	2
Lila Devi	03/04/1956	02/04/1962	1
Shiva Nand Ramaul	03/04/1962	02/04/1968	1
Satyavati Dang	03/04/1968	02/04/1974	1
Roshan Lal	03/04/1970	02/04/1976	1
Roshan Lal	03/04/1976	02/04/1982	2
Roshan Lal	03/04/1982	02/04/1988	3
Jagannath Bharadwaj	10/04/1972	09/01/1978	1
Gian Chand Totu	03/04/1974	02/04/1980	1
Usha Malhotra	03/04/1980	02/04/1986	1
Anand Sharma	10/04/1984	09/04/1990	1
Anand Sharma	03/04/2004	02/04/2010	2
Anand Sharma	03/04/2016	02/04/2022	4
Chandan Sharma	03/04/1986	02/04/1992	1
Sushil Barongpa	03/04/1988	02/04/1994	1
Sushil Barongpa	03/04/1994	02/04/2000	2
Chandresh Kumari	10/04/1996	09/04/2002	1
Viplove Thakur	10/04/2006	09/04/2012	1
Viplove Thakur	10/04/2014	09/04/2020	2

== Himachal Pradesh Legislative Assembly election ==
Year	Party leader	Seats won	Change in seats	Outcome
1952	Yashwant Singh Parmar	24 / 36	New	Government
1967	Yashwant Singh Parmar	34 / 60	▲10	Government
1972	Thakur Ram Lal	53 / 68	▲19	Government
1977	Thakur Ram Lal	9 / 68	▼44	Opposition
1982	Thakur Ram Lal	31 / 68	▲22	Government
1985	Virbhadra Singh	58 / 68	▲27	Government
1990	Virbhadra Singh	9 / 68	▼49	Opposition
1993	Virbhadra Singh	52 / 68	▲43	Government
1998	Virbhadra Singh	31 / 68	▼21	Opposition
2003	Virbhadra Singh	43 / 68	▲12	Government
2007	Virbhadra Singh	23 / 68	▼20	Opposition
2012	Virbhadra Singh	36 / 68	▲13	Government
2017	Virbhadra Singh	21 / 68	▼15	Opposition
2022	Sukhvinder Singh Sukhu	40 / 68	▲19	Government

== Performance in Himachal Pradesh Lok Sabha elections ==
Lok Sabha Elections
Year	Lok Sabha	Party Leader	Seats contested	Seats won	(+/−) in seats	% of votes	Vote swing	Popular vote	Outcome
1951	1st	Jawaharlal Nehru	3	3 / 3 (100%)	3	52.44%	New entry	1,17,036	Government
1957	2nd	Jawaharlal Nehru	4	4 / 4 (100%)	▲1	47.32%		1,71,591	Government
1962	3rd	Jawaharlal Nehru	4	4 / 4 (100%)	Steady	68.65%		1,66,749	Government
1967	4th	Indira Gandhi	6	6 / 6 (100%)	▲2	48.35%		3,75,578	Government
1971	5th	Indira Gandhi	4	4 / 4 (100%)	▼2	75.79%		5,16,959	Government
1977	6th	Indira Gandhi	4	0 / 4 (0%)	▼4	38.58%		4,39,398	Opposition
1980	7th	Indira Gandhi	4	4 / 4 (100%)	▲4	52.08%		6,53,018	Government
1984	8th	Rajiv Gandhi	4	4 / 4 (100%)	Steady	67.58%		9,42,657	Government
1989	9th	Rajiv Gandhi	4	1 / 4 (25%)	▼3	41.97%		7,89,804	Opposition
1991	10th	P. V. Narasimha Rao	4	2 / 4 (50%)	▲1	46.16%		8,08,659	Government
1996	11th	P. V. Narasimha Rao	4	4 / 4 (100%)	▲2	54.33%		10,97,007	Opposition
1998	12th	Sitaram Kesri	4	1 / 4 (25%)	▼3	41.90%		9,97,410	Opposition
1999	13th	Sonia Gandhi	4	0 / 4 (0%)	▼1	39.52%		8,43,225	Opposition
2004	14th	Sonia Gandhi	4	1 / 4 (25%)	▲1	44.24%		11,04,066	Government
2009	15th	Manmohan Singh	4	1 / 4 (25%)	Steady	45.61%		12,26,933	Government
2014	16th	Rahul Gandhi	4	0 / 4 (0%)	▼1	40.68%		12,60,477	Opposition
2019	17th	Rahul Gandhi	4	0 / 4 (0%)	Steady	27.30%		10,51,113	Opposition
2024	18th	Mallikarjun Kharge	4	0 / 4 (0%)	Steady	41.67%		16,66,322	Opposition

== See also ==
- Indian National Congress
- Congress Working Committee
- All India Congress Committee
- Pradesh Congress Committee
