= List of Rajya Sabha members from Himachal Pradesh =

The list of current and past Rajya Sabha members from the Himachal Pradesh State. State elect 3 member for the term of 6 years and indirectly elected by the state legislators, since year 1956.

== List of all Rajya Sabha members from Himachal Pradesh state ==
Chronological list by last date of appointment

- * represents current members

Name	Party	Term start	Term end	Term	Notes
Anurag Sharma	INC	10-Apr-2026	10-Apr-2032	1	
Harsh Mahajan	BJP	03-Apr-2024	02-Apr-2030	1	
Sikander Kumar	BJP	03-Apr-2022	02-Apr-2028	1	
Indu Goswami	BJP	10-Apr-2020	09-Apr-2026	1	
Jagat Prakash Nadda	BJP	03-Apr-2018	02-Apr-2024	2	
Anand Sharma	INC	03-Apr-2016	02-Apr-2022	3	
Viplove Thakur	INC	10-Apr-2014	09-Apr-2020	2	
Jagat Prakash Nadda	BJP	03-Apr-2012	02-Apr-2018	1	
Bimla Kashyap Sood	BJP	03-Apr-2010	02-Apr-2016	1	
Shanta Kumar	BJP	10-Apr-2008	09-Apr-2014	1	
Viplove Thakur	INC	03-Apr-2006	02-Apr-2012	1	
Anand Sharma	INC	03-Apr-2004	02-Apr-2010	2	
Suresh Bharadwaj	BJP	10-Apr-2002	09-Apr-2008	1	
Kripal Parmar	BJP	03-Apr-2000	02-Apr-2006	1	
Anil Sharma	HVC	03-Apr-1998	02-Apr-2004	1	
Chandresh Kumari Katoch	INC	10-Apr-1996	09-Apr-2002	1	
Sushil Barongpa	INC	03-Apr-1994	02-Apr-2000	2	
Maheshwar Singh	BJP	03-Apr-1992	02-Apr-1998	1	
Krishan Lal Sharma	BJP	10-Apr-1990	09-Apr-1996	1	
Sushil Barongpa	INC	03-Apr-1988	02-Apr-1994	1	
Chandan Sharma	INC	03-Apr-1986	02-Apr-1992	1	
Anand Sharma	INC	10-Apr-1984	09-Apr-1990	1	
Roshan Lal	INC	03-Apr-1982	02-Apr-1988	3	
Usha Malhotra	INC	03-Apr-1980	02-Apr-1986	1	
Mohinder Kaur	BJP	10-Apr-1978	09-Apr-1984	1	
Roshan Lal	INC	03-Apr-1976	02-Apr-1982	2	
Gian Chand Totu	INC	03-Apr-1974	02-Apr-1980	1	
Jagannath Bharadwaj	INC	10-Apr-1972	09-Apr-1978	1	
Roshan Lal	INC	03-Apr-1970	02-Apr-1976	1	
Satyavati Dang	INC	03-Apr-1968	02-Apr-1974	1	
C L Varma	INC	03-Apr-1964	02-Apr-1970	2	Bilaspur & HP
Shiva Nand Ramaul	INC	03-Apr-1962	02-Apr-1968	1	
Lila Devi	INC	03-Apr-1956	02-Apr-1962	1	
C L Varma	INC	03-Apr-1952	02-Apr-1958	1	Bilaspur & HP

== See also ==
- List of Lok Sabha Members from Himachal Pradesh
