= Prem Singh (Himachal Pradesh politician) =

Indian politician

Dr.Prem Singh
- डॉ.प्रेम सिंह

Member of the Himachal Pradesh Legislative Assembly
- In office 19 May 1982 – 23 September 2011
- Preceded by: Constituency established
- Succeeded by: Vinay Kumar
- Constituency: Sri Renukaji Assembly constituency

Personal details
- Born: Dr.Prem Singh; 23 September 1948 Maina bagh, Sangrah tehsil, Sirmour district, Himachal Pradesh, India
- Died: 23 September 2011 (aged 63) Maina bagh, Sangrah tehsil, Sirmour district, Himachal Pradesh, India
- Citizenship: India
- Party: Indian National Congress
- Spouse: Vidya Devi
- Children: 2
- Education: University of Punjab
- Occupation: Politician
- Profession: Veterinarian; Agriculturist

Prem Singh (23 September 1948 – 23 September 2011) was an Indian politician, social worker and six-time MLA from Sri Renukaji Assembly constituency as a member of the Indian National Congress.

== Early life ==
Singh was born in a poor Agriculturist family of Maina Bagh, Renuka Sirmour of Himachal Pradesh. Despite hardships he became a veterinarian doctor. He is the father of Himachal Pradesh Congress Committee president Vinay Kumar who is an MLA for the same constituency.

== Career ==
Singh was a former Chief Parliamentary Secretary of the Government of Himachal Pradesh.

He was first elected as an MLA winning the 1982 Himachal Pradesh Legislative Assembly election representing Indian National Congress from Sri Renukaji Assembly constituency. Later, he won five more times from Shri Renuka Ji winning the 1985, 1993, 1998, 2003 and 2007 elections. After delimitation the constituency became Sri Renukaji.

=== Death ===
Singh had a heart attack during his birthday celebration at his parents house on 23 September 2011.
