= Vinod Sultanpuri =

Indian politician

- विनोद सुल्तानपुरी
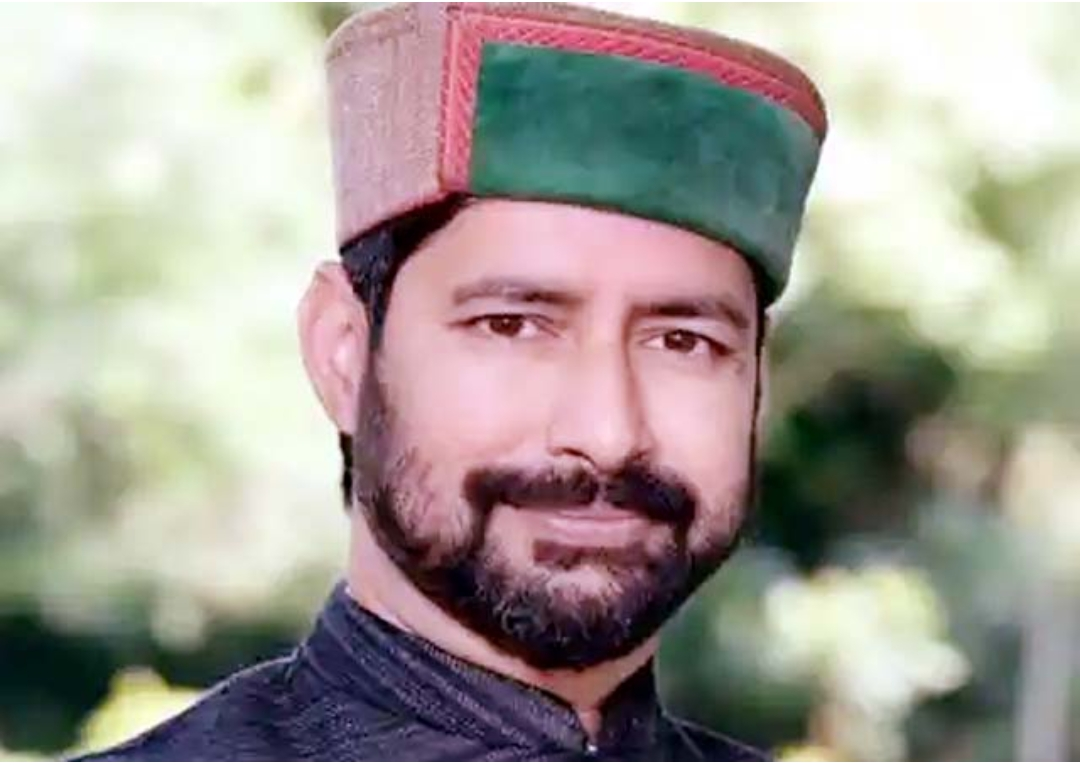
- Vinod Sultanpuri

MLA for Kasauli
- Incumbent
- Assumed office 2022
- Governor: Rajendra Arlekar
- Preceded by: Rajiv Saizal
- Constituency: Kasauli Assembly constituency

Personal details
- Born: Vinod Kumar Sultanpuri; 3 February 1982 (age 44) Sultanpur, Solan district, Himachal Pradesh, India, Asia
- Citizenship: India
- Party: Indian National Congress
- Spouse: Ranjana Sultanpuri
- Children: 1 son, 1 daughter
- Parents: Krishan Dutt Sultanpuri (father); Satya Devi Sultanpuri (mother)
- Education: L.L.B & B.S.L
- Alma mater: Indian Society of International Law
- Occupation: Politician
- Profession: Advocate; Agriculturist

Vinod Kumar Sultanpuri is an Indian politician, social worker and incumbent Member of the Himachal Pradesh Legislative Assembly from Kasauli Assembly constituency as a member of Indian National Congress defeating Rajiv Saizal of Bharatiya Janata Party by the margin of 6,768 votes.

== Personal life ==
He is son of Krishna Dutt Sultanpuri, a six-term Member of Parliament. He belongs to the Koli caste of Himachal Pradesh.

== Political career ==
- 2006 - 2008, District president of Indian Youth Congress Solan
- 2009 - 2011, National Secretary of Indian Youth Congress
- 2012 - 2019, General Secretary of Himachal Pradesh Congress Committee
- 2022 - Ongoing, Member of Legislative Assembly for Kasauli Assembly constituency
