= Vinay Kumar (politician) =

Indian politician

Vinay Kumar MLA of Sri Renukaji
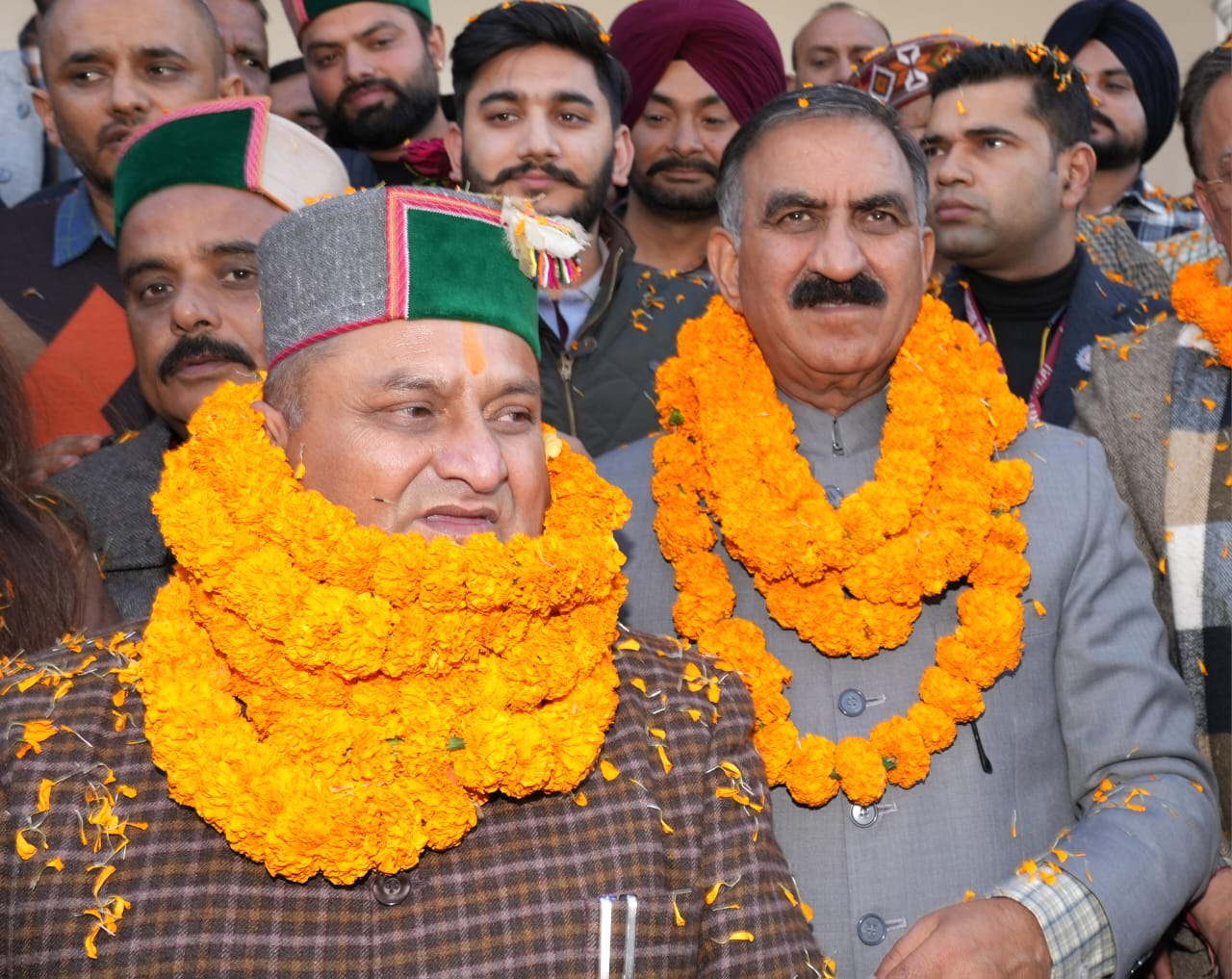

President Himachal Pradesh Congress Committee
- Incumbent
- Assumed office 22 November 2025
- National President: Mallikarjun Kharge
- Preceded by: Pratibha Singh

Deputy Speaker of the Himachal Pradesh Legislative Assembly
- In office 12 December 2023 – 22 November 2025
- Speaker: Kuldeep Singh Pathania
- Preceded by: Hans Raj
- Succeeded by: Vacant

Member of the Himachal Pradesh Legislative Assembly
- Incumbent
- Assumed office 20 December 2012
- Governor: Shiv Pratap Shukla
- Chief Minister: Sukhvinder Singh Sukhu
- Deputy CM: Mukesh Agnihotri
- Preceded by: Prem Singh
- Constituency: Sri Renukaji

Personal details
- Born: 12 March 1978 (age 48) Maina Bagh, Himachal Pradesh, India
- Party: Indian National Congress
- Spouse: Smt. Seema Bhushan
- Parents: Prem Singh (father); Vidya Devi (mother)
- Occupation: Politician
- Profession: Agriculturist
- Website: vinaykumarinc.com

Shri Vinay Kumar is an Indian politician, social worker, incumbent Member of Legislative Assembly for Sri Renukaji Assembly constituency and former deputy speaker of the Himachal Pradesh Legislative Assembly. He is a former Chief Parliamentary Secretary of the Government of Himachal Pradesh. He is also the president of Himachal Pradesh Congress Committee.

== Early life ==
Vinay Kumar was born in a agriculturist Koli family in Vill. Maina Bagh, Shri Renuka Ji, District Sirmour, Himachal Pradesh. His parents are Prem Singh and Vidya Devi.
