= Chamba Assembly constituency =

Legislative Assembly constituency in Himachal Pradesh State, India

Coordinates: 32.55°N 76.13°E

Chamba
- Constituency No. 3 for the Himachal Pradesh Legislative Assembly

Constituency details
- Country: India
- Region: North India
- State: Himachal Pradesh
- District: Chamba
- Lok Sabha constituency: Kangra
- Established: 1951
- Total electors: 84,616
- Reservation: None

Member of Legislative Assembly
- 14th Himachal Pradesh Legislative Assembly
- Incumbent Neeraj Nayar
- Party: Indian National Congress
- Elected year: 2022

Chamba Assembly constituency is one of the 68 constituencies in the Himachal Pradesh Legislative Assembly of Himachal Pradesh a northern state of India. Chamba is also part of Kangra Lok Sabha constituency.

== Members of Legislative Assembly ==
Year	Member	Picture	Party
1951	Chattar Singh		Indian National Congress
1967	Kishori Lal		Bharatiya Jana Sangh
1972	Kishori Lal		Bharatiya Jana Sangh
1977	Kishori Lal		Janata Party
1982	Sagar Chand Nayar		Indian National Congress
1985	Sagar Chand Nayar		Indian National Congress
1990	Kishori Lal		Bharatiya Janata Party
1993	Harsh Mahajan		Indian National Congress
1998	Harsh Mahajan		Indian National Congress
2003	Harsh Mahajan		Indian National Congress
2007	Bal Krishan Chauhan		Bharatiya Janata Party
2012	Bal Krishan Chauhan		Bharatiya Janata Party
2017	Pawan Nayyar		Bharatiya Janata Party
2022	Neeraj Nayar		Indian National Congress

== Election results ==
=== Assembly Election 2022 ===
2022 Himachal Pradesh Legislative Assembly election: Chamba
Party	Candidate	Votes	%	±%
INC	Neeraj Nayar	32,783	53.28%	▲8.25
BJP	Neelam Nayyar	25,001	40.63%	▼7.80
Independent	Indira Kapoor	2,443	3.97%	New
NOTA	Nota	539	0.88%	▼0.34
AAP	Shasi Kant	356	0.58%	New
Margin of victory		7,782	12.65%	▲9.25
Turnout		61,528	72.71%	▼0.68
Registered electors		84,616		▲12.39
INC gain from BJP		Swing	▲4.85	

=== Assembly Election 2017 ===
2017 Himachal Pradesh Legislative Assembly election: Chamba
Party	Candidate	Votes	%	±%
BJP	Pawan Nayyar	26,763	48.43%	▲9.82
INC	Neeraj Nayar	24,884	45.03%	▲10.20
Independent	Dr. D. K. Soni	725	1.31%	New
NOTA	None of the Above	674	1.22%	New
Independent	B. K. Chauhan	649	1.17%	New
BSP	Paras Ram	562	1.02%	▲0.07
Margin of victory		1,879	3.40%	▼0.39
Turnout		55,258	73.39%	▼1.37
Registered electors		75,289		▲10.26
BJP hold		Swing	▲9.82	

=== Assembly Election 2012 ===
2012 Himachal Pradesh Legislative Assembly election: Chamba
Party	Candidate	Votes	%	±%
BJP	B. K. Chauhan	19,714	38.62%	▼18.80
INC	Pawan Nayyar	17,780	34.83%	▼3.97
Independent	Raj Singh	10,813	21.18%	New
CPI	Rattan Chand	1,310	2.57%	New
BSP	Noordeen Noorani	482	0.94%	▼1.12
Independent	Anita Thakur	388	0.76%	New
Independent	C. L. Thakur	354	0.69%	New
Margin of victory		1,934	3.79%	▼14.82
Turnout		51,051	74.76%	▲2.51
Registered electors		68,283		▲6.07
BJP hold		Swing	▼18.80	

=== Assembly Election 2007 ===
2007 Himachal Pradesh Legislative Assembly election: Chamba
Party	Candidate	Votes	%	±%
BJP	B. K. Chauhan	26,705	57.41%	▲12.39
INC	Pawan Nayyar	18,048	38.80%	▼11.24
BSP	Vineet Puri	960	2.06%	New
LJP	Nand Lal	798	1.72%	▲0.22
Margin of victory		8,657	18.61%	▲13.60
Turnout		46,513	72.26%	▼5.17
Registered electors		64,373		▲14.25
BJP gain from INC		Swing	▲7.38	

=== Assembly Election 2003 ===
2003 Himachal Pradesh Legislative Assembly election: Chamba
Party	Candidate	Votes	%	±%
INC	Harsh Mahajan	21,829	50.04%	▼4.03
BJP	B. K. Chauhan	19,642	45.02%	▲5.19
Independent	Chandra Mani	850	1.95%	New
LJP	Nand Lal	654	1.50%	New
HVC	D. P. Malhotra	650	1.49%	▼0.99
Margin of victory		2,187	5.01%	▼9.22
Turnout		43,625	77.56%	▲7.73
Registered electors		56,344		▲8.55
INC hold		Swing	▼4.03	

=== Assembly Election 1998 ===
1998 Himachal Pradesh Legislative Assembly election: Chamba
Party	Candidate	Votes	%	±%
INC	Harsh Mahajan	19,562	54.07%	▼5.49
BJP	Kewal Krishan	14,411	39.83%	▲0.24
HVC	Ashok Kumar	898	2.48%	New
CPI	Chandra Mani	582	1.61%	New
Independent	D. P. Malhotra	200	0.55%	New
Independent	Kishore Kumar	189	0.52%	New
Margin of victory		5,151	14.24%	▼5.73
Turnout		36,179	70.64%	▼2.23
Registered electors		51,908		▲8.82
INC hold		Swing	▼5.49	

=== Assembly Election 1993 ===
1993 Himachal Pradesh Legislative Assembly election: Chamba
Party	Candidate	Votes	%	±%
INC	Harsh Mahajan	20,435	59.56%	▲19.88
BJP	Kishori Lal	13,585	39.60%	▼18.80
Margin of victory		6,850	19.97%	▲1.25
Turnout		34,309	72.48%	▲4.46
Registered electors		47,699		▲4.77
INC gain from BJP		Swing		

=== Assembly Election 1990 ===
1990 Himachal Pradesh Legislative Assembly election: Chamba
Party	Candidate	Votes	%	±%
BJP	Kishori Lal	17,938	58.40%	▲17.52
INC	Sagar Chand	12,189	39.68%	▼14.89
Doordarshi Party	Daya Shiel	232	0.76%	New
Independent	Janki Nath	225	0.73%	New
Margin of victory		5,749	18.72%	▲5.02
Turnout		30,716	67.82%	▼0.53
Registered electors		45,528		▲27.22
BJP gain from INC		Swing	▲3.83	

=== Assembly Election 1985 ===
1985 Himachal Pradesh Legislative Assembly election: Chamba
Party	Candidate	Votes	%	±%
INC	Sagar Chand	13,278	54.57%	▼0.03
BJP	Kishori Lal	9,946	40.88%	▼1.89
CPI	Rattan Chand	909	3.74%	New
Independent	Daya Shiel	199	0.82%	New
Margin of victory		3,332	13.69%	▲1.87
Turnout		24,332	68.45%	▼3.40
Registered electors		35,786		▲9.45
INC hold		Swing	▼0.03	

=== Assembly Election 1982 ===
1982 Himachal Pradesh Legislative Assembly election: Chamba
Party	Candidate	Votes	%	±%
INC	Sagar Chand	12,744	54.60%	▲14.92
BJP	Kishori Lal	9,983	42.77%	New
JP	Kirpa Ram	271	1.16%	▼59.16
Independent	Daya Shiel	241	1.03%	New
Margin of victory		2,761	11.83%	▼8.81
Turnout		23,342	72.15%	▲8.17
Registered electors		32,697		▲10.94
INC gain from JP		Swing	▼5.72	

=== Assembly Election 1977 ===
1977 Himachal Pradesh Legislative Assembly election: Chamba
Party	Candidate	Votes	%	±%
JP	Kishori Lal	11,239	60.32%	New
INC	Sagar Chand	7,393	39.68%	▼3.26
Margin of victory		3,846	20.64%	▲19.16
Turnout		18,632	64.03%	▲10.94
Registered electors		29,474		▼6.42
JP gain from ABJS		Swing	▲15.90	

=== Assembly Election 1972 ===
1972 Himachal Pradesh Legislative Assembly election: Chamba
Party	Candidate	Votes	%	±%
ABJS	Kishori Lal	7,314	44.42%	▼24.67
INC	Sagar Chand	7,070	42.94%	▲13.99
Independent	Kuldip Chand	2,081	12.64%	New
Margin of victory		244	1.48%	▼38.66
Turnout		16,465	53.55%	▲11.34
Registered electors		31,495		▲14.46
ABJS hold		Swing	▼24.67	

=== Assembly Election 1967 ===
1967 Himachal Pradesh Legislative Assembly election: Chamba
Party	Candidate	Votes	%	±%
ABJS	Kishori Lal	7,783	69.09%	▲45.04
INC	K. Chand	3,261	28.95%	▼32.17
Independent	Nand Lal	221	1.96%	New
Margin of victory		4,522	40.14%	▲3.07
Turnout		11,265	42.06%	▲15.47
Registered electors		27,517		▲66.83
ABJS gain from INC		Swing	▲7.97	

=== Assembly Election 1952 ===
1952 Himachal Pradesh Legislative Assembly election: Chamba
Party	Candidate	Votes	%	±%
INC	Chattar Singh	2,567	61.12%	New
ABJS	Mangat Ram	1,010	24.05%	New
Independent	Manhat Pal	315	7.50%	New
KMPP	Mohan Lall	308	7.33%	New
Margin of victory		1,557	37.07%	
Turnout		4,200	25.46%	
Registered electors		16,494		
INC win (new seat)				

== See also ==
- Chamba district
- Kangra district
- List of constituencies of Himachal Pradesh Legislative Assembly
