= Sunni Assembly constituency =

Constituency of the Himachal Pradesh legislative assembly in India

Coordinates: 31.222°N 77.190°E

Sunni
- Former constituency for the Himachal Pradesh Legislative Assembly

Constituency details
- Country: India
- Region: North India
- State: Himachal Pradesh
- District: Shimla
- Established: 1952
- Abolished: 1957
- Total electors: 14,160

Sunni was an assembly constituency in the India state of Himachal Pradesh.

== Members of the Legislative Assembly ==
Election	Member	Party
1952	Sita Ram	Indian National Congress

== Election results ==
=== Assembly Election 1952 ===
1952 Himachal Pradesh Legislative Assembly election: Sunni
Party	Candidate	Votes	%	±%
INC	Sita Ram	1,545	47.83%	New
Independent	Lila Dass Verma	803	24.86%	New
Independent	Tara Singh	516	15.98%	New
SCF	Jiwanoo	366	11.33%	New
Margin of victory		742	22.97%	
Turnout		3,230	22.81%	
Registered electors		14,160		
INC win (new seat)				
