= Inder Singh (politician) =

Indian police officer and politician

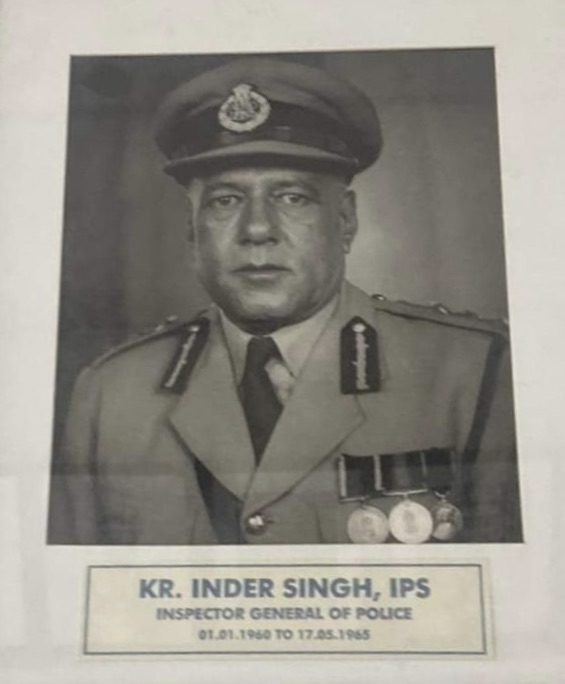
- Inder Singh as Inspector General Police, Himachal Pradesh

Member of Legislative Assembly, Bhattiyat Assembly constituency, 1967-72

Inspector General of Himachal Pradesh Police, 1960-65

Personal details
- Born: 19 May 1910
- Died: 5 December 1993 (aged 83)
- Citizenship: Indian
- Party: Jan Sangh
- Spouse: Uttam Devi
- Children: 5
- Education: Police Training School, Phillaur
- Profession: Police officer

Inder Singh (19 May 1910 - 5 December 1993) was a senior police officer and later a politician in Himachal Pradesh, India.

== Personal life ==
Singh belonged to the royal family of Jaswan. In February 1945, Singh married Uttam Devi of the Chamba royal family. Uttam Devi was the daughter of Kanwar Saheb Shri Nihal Singhji, a son of Raja Shyam Singh of Chamba (r.1873—1904). Inder Singh and Uttam Devi had four daughters (Neena, Neeta, Neema, and Neeru) and one son (Col. Vijay Singh). One of their daughters, Neeru Kumari, married Vijay Singh, who descended from the Sirmur royal family.

== Police career ==
Singh was the first trained gazetted officer from the Police Training School, Phillaur, and was posted as the Superintendent of Police in the Chamba state. He reorganised the police force according to the Punjab Police Rules. Later, he became the Home Member and the Deputy Inspector General of Police of the Chamba state - a post he continued to hold during the merger of the Chamba state with the newly-created province of Himachal Pradesh (on 15 April 1948).

In 1958, at the rank of Assistant Inspector General, CID & Headquarters (Himachal Pradesh), he was awarded the Police Medal for Meritorious Services by the President of India.

From 1 January 1960 to 17 May 1965, he served as the Inspector General of Police, Himachal Pradesh.

== Political career ==
Singh was later elected as an MLA of the Jan Sangh party from the Bhattiyat assembly constituency in Chamba, for a five-year term, during the Second Legislative Assembly of the state (1967–72).

On 10 July 1967, he was one of the few MLAs to move a Motion of No-Confidence against the Y.S. Parmar-led Congress government. This motion was forwarded on account of alleged discrimination against constituencies that sent non-Congress MLAs to the Vidhan Sabha, deteriorating food security and worsening the condition of manual farmers and workers in the state, among other reasons. The motion was defeated.
