= List of speakers of the Himachal Pradesh Legislative Assembly =

Presiding officer for HP Assembly

Speaker of the Himachal Pradesh Legislative Assembly
- Incumbent; Kuldeep Singh Pathania since 5 January 2023
- Himachal Pradesh Legislative Assembly
- Style: The Honourable
- Member of: Himachal Pradesh Legislative Assembly
- Nominator: Members of the Himachal Pradesh Legislative Assembly
- Appointer: Governor of Himachal Pradesh
- Term length: During the life of the Assembly (five years maximum); Renewable
- Inaugural holder: Jaiwant Ram (1952–1956)
- Formation: 24 March 1952; 74 years ago

The Speaker of the Himachal Pradesh Legislative Assembly is the presiding officer of the Legislative Assembly of Himachal Pradesh, the main law-making body for the Indian state of Himachal Pradesh. The Speaker is elected in the very first meeting of the Himachal Pradesh Legislative Assembly after the general elections for a term of 5 years from amongst the members of the assembly. The Speaker must be a member of the assembly. The Speaker can be removed from office by a resolution passed in the assembly by an effective majority of its members. In the absence of Speaker, the meeting of the Legislative Assembly is presided by the Deputy Speaker.

== List of the Speakers ==
#	Portrait	Name	Constituency	Term			Party
1		Jaiwant Ram	Bhattiyat	24 March 1952	31 October 1956	4 years, 221 days	Indian National Congress
2		Desh Raj Mahajan	Banikhet	4 January 1963	18 March 1967	9 years, 73 days	Indian National Congress
2		Desh Raj Mahajan	Banikhet	20 March 1967	19 March 1972	9 years, 73 days	Indian National Congress
3		Kultar Chand Rana	Shahpur	28 March 1972	29 June 1977	5 years, 93 days	Indian National Congress
4		Sarvan Kumar	Palampur	30 June 1977	18 April 1979	1 year, 292 days	Janata Party
5		Thakur Sen Negi	Kinnaur	8 May 1979	21 June 1982	5 years, 129 days	Independent
5		Thakur Sen Negi	Kinnaur	22 June 1982	14 September 1984	5 years, 129 days	Independent
6		Vidya Stokes	Theog	11 March 1985	19 March 1990	5 years, 8 days	Indian National Congress
7		Radha Raman Shastri	Chopal	20 March 1990	17 August 1990	150 days	Bharatiya Janata Party
(5)		Thakur Sen Negi	Kinnaur	20 August 1990	14 December 1993	3 years, 116 days	Bharatiya Janata Party
8		Kaul Singh Thakur	Darang	15 December 1993	12 March 1998	4 years, 87 days	Indian National Congress
9		Gulab Singh Thakur	Jogindernagar	30 March 1998	7 March 2003	4 years, 342 days	Indian National Congress
10		Gangu Ram Musafir	Pachhad	11 March 2003	9 January 2008	4 years, 304 days	Indian National Congress
11		Tulsi Ram	Bharmour	11 January 2008	1 January 2013	4 years, 356 days	Bharatiya Janata Party
12		Brij Behari Lal Butail	Palampur	9 January 2013	5 January 2018	4 years, 361 days	Indian National Congress
13		Rajeev Bindal	Nahan	10 January 2018	16 January 2020	2 years, 6 days	Bharatiya Janata Party
14		Vipin Singh Parmar	Sullah	26 February 2020	13 December 2022	2 years, 290 days	Bharatiya Janata Party
15		Kuldeep Singh Pathania	Bhattiyat	5 January 2023	Incumbent	3 years, 245 days	Indian National Congress

== Pro tem Speaker ==
Chander Kumar 2022
