= Nurpur Assembly constituency =

Legislative Assembly constituency in Himachal Pradesh State, India

Coordinates: 32.3°N 75.89°E

Nurpur
- Constituency No. 6 for the Himachal Pradesh Legislative Assembly

Constituency details
- Country: India
- Region: North India
- State: Himachal Pradesh
- District: Kangra
- Lok Sabha constituency: Kangra
- Established: 1967
- Total electors: 91,269
- Reservation: None

Member of Legislative Assembly
- 14th Himachal Pradesh Legislative Assembly
- Incumbent Ranbir Singh Nikka
- Party: Bharatiya Janata Party
- Elected year: 2022

Nurpur Assembly constituency is one of the 68 constituencies in the Himachal Pradesh Legislative Assembly. Nurpur is part of Kangra Lok Sabha constituency.

== Members of Legislative Assembly ==
Year	Member	Picture	Party
1967	K. Singh		Indian National Congress
1972	Kewal Singh		Independent
1977	Sat Mahajan		Indian National Congress
1982	Sat Mahajan		Indian National Congress
1985	Sat Mahajan		Indian National Congress
1990	Kewal Singh		Janata Dal
1993	Sat Mahajan		Indian National Congress
1996 By-Election	Ranjit Singh Bakshashi		Indian National Congress
1998	Rakesh Pathania		Bharatiya Janata Party
2003	Sat Mahajan		Indian National Congress
2007	Rakesh Pathania		Bharatiya Janata Party
2012	Ajay Mahajan		Indian National Congress
2017	Rakesh Pathania		Bharatiya Janata Party
2022	Ranbir Singh Nikka		Bharatiya Janata Party

== Election results ==
=== Assembly Election 2022 ===
2022 Himachal Pradesh Legislative Assembly election: Nurpur
Party	Candidate	Votes	%	±%
BJP	Ranbir Singh Nikka	44,132	62.45%	▲8.63
INC	Ajay Mahajan	25,380	35.92%	▼7.65
BSP	Sali Ram	325	0.46%	▼0.29
NOTA	Nota	302	0.43%	▼0.27
AAP	Manisha Kumari	286	0.40%	New
Independent	Subhash Singh Dhadwal	239	0.34%	New
Margin of victory		18,752	26.54%	▲16.29
Turnout		70,664	75.40%	▼2.57
Registered electors		93,717		▲12.78
BJP hold		Swing	▲8.63	

=== Assembly Election 2017 ===
2017 Himachal Pradesh Legislative Assembly election: Nurpur
Party	Candidate	Votes	%	±%
BJP	Rakesh Pathania	34,871	53.82%	▲41.84
INC	Ajay Mahajan	28,229	43.57%	▼2.74
BSP	Harnam Singh	484	0.75%	▲0.14
NOTA	None of the Above	454	0.70%	New
Margin of victory		6,642	10.25%	▲4.38
Turnout		64,790	77.97%	▲1.21
Registered electors		83,099		▲11.27
BJP gain from INC		Swing	▲7.51	

=== Assembly Election 2012 ===
2012 Himachal Pradesh Legislative Assembly election: Nurpur
Party	Candidate	Votes	%	±%
INC	Ajay Mahajan	26,546	46.31%	▲8.25
Independent	Rakesh Pathania	23,179	40.44%	New
BJP	Ranbir Singh Nikka	6,868	11.98%	▲5.88
BSP	Sali Ram	346	0.60%	▼9.41
Himachal Swabhiman Party	N.S Pathania	338	0.59%	New
Margin of victory		3,367	5.87%	▼0.48
Turnout		57,318	76.75%	▲2.37
Registered electors		74,679		▼15.30
INC gain from Independent		Swing	▲1.90	

=== Assembly Election 2007 ===
2007 Himachal Pradesh Legislative Assembly election: Nurpur
Party	Candidate	Votes	%	±%
Independent	Rakesh Pathania	29,128	44.41%	New
INC	Ajay Mahajan	24,963	38.06%	▼15.13
BSP	Kewal Singh Pathania	6,570	10.02%	▲8.38
BJP	Malvika Pathania	4,003	6.10%	▼31.16
Independent	Chhaju Ram	345	0.53%	New
LJP	Narendar Kumar	335	0.51%	▼0.61
Margin of victory		4,165	6.35%	▼9.58
Turnout		65,582	74.38%	▼4.12
Registered electors		88,170		▲14.89
Independent gain from INC		Swing	▼8.78	

=== Assembly Election 2003 ===
2003 Himachal Pradesh Legislative Assembly election: Nurpur
Party	Candidate	Votes	%	±%
INC	Sat Mahajan	32,049	53.20%	▲7.81
BJP	Rakesh Pathania	22,450	37.27%	▼13.07
Independent	Ranjit Singh Bakshashi	2,852	4.73%	New
BSP	Amar Singh	984	1.63%	▼1.72
LJP	Narender Kumar	676	1.12%	New
Independent	Harnam Singh	617	1.02%	New
Independent	Yash Pal Singh	447	0.74%	New
Margin of victory		9,599	15.93%	▲10.99
Turnout		60,244	78.69%	▲3.83
Registered electors		76,740		▲17.64
INC gain from BJP		Swing	▲2.87	

=== Assembly Election 1998 ===
1998 Himachal Pradesh Legislative Assembly election: Nurpur
Party	Candidate	Votes	%	±%
BJP	Rakesh Pathania	24,516	50.33%	▲5.06
INC	Ranjit Singh Bakshashi	22,110	45.39%	▼2.42
BSP	Karan Chand	1,633	3.35%	▼3.28
Margin of victory		2,406	4.94%	▲2.40
Turnout		48,710	75.35%	▲6.77
Registered electors		65,232		▲3.25
BJP gain from INC		Swing		

=== Assembly By-election 1996 ===
1996 Himachal Pradesh Legislative Assembly by-election: Nurpur
Party	Candidate	Votes	%	±%
INC	Ranjit Singh Bakshashi	20,511	47.81%	▼15.50
BJP	Rakesh Pathania	19,422	45.27%	▲14.95
BSP	Karan Chand	2,847	6.64%	▲1.31
Margin of victory		1,089	2.54%	▼30.45
Turnout		42,900	68.23%	▼10.16
Registered electors		63,176		▲7.81
INC hold		Swing		

=== Assembly Election 1993 ===
1993 Himachal Pradesh Legislative Assembly election: Nurpur
Party	Candidate	Votes	%	±%
INC	Sat Mahajan	28,961	63.31%	▲18.97
BJP	Megh Raj Awasthi	13,870	30.32%	New
BSP	Karan Chand	2,437	5.33%	▲4.47
Margin of victory		15,091	32.99%	▲24.71
Turnout		45,744	78.51%	▲3.63
Registered electors		58,598		▲4.91
INC gain from JD		Swing		

=== Assembly Election 1990 ===
1990 Himachal Pradesh Legislative Assembly election: Nurpur
Party	Candidate	Votes	%	±%
JD	Kewal Singh	21,879	52.62%	New
INC	Sat Mahajan	18,436	44.34%	▼17.68
Independent	Gobind Ram Hitor	395	0.95%	New
BSP	Parkash Chand	356	0.86%	New
INS(SCS)	Inder Choudhary	223	0.54%	New
Margin of victory		3,443	8.28%	▼17.55
Turnout		41,577	74.88%	▼3.05
Registered electors		55,855		▲36.64
JD gain from INC		Swing	▼9.40	

=== Assembly Election 1985 ===
1985 Himachal Pradesh Legislative Assembly election: Nurpur
Party	Candidate	Votes	%	±%
INC	Sat Mahajan	19,643	62.02%	▲11.47
BJP	Megh Raj	11,460	36.18%	▲28.98
Independent	Kamal Kishore	306	0.97%	New
Independent	Prita Singh	264	0.83%	New
Margin of victory		8,183	25.84%	▲15.00
Turnout		31,673	78.28%	▼4.63
Registered electors		40,877		▲10.28
INC hold		Swing	▲11.47	

=== Assembly Election 1982 ===
1982 Himachal Pradesh Legislative Assembly election: Nurpur
Party	Candidate	Votes	%	±%
INC	Sat Mahajan	15,384	50.54%	▼0.54
JP	Kewal Singh	12,085	39.70%	▼5.26
BJP	Megh Raj	2,192	7.20%	New
Independent	Pyare Lal	177	0.58%	New
Margin of victory		3,299	10.84%	▲4.72
Turnout		30,437	83.50%	▲7.78
Registered electors		37,065		▲11.57
INC hold		Swing	▼0.54	

=== Assembly Election 1977 ===
1977 Himachal Pradesh Legislative Assembly election: Nurpur
Party	Candidate	Votes	%	±%
INC	Sat Mahajan	12,617	51.09%	▲9.24
JP	Kewal Singh	11,105	44.96%	New
Independent	Balwant Singh	383	1.55%	New
Independent	Tara Singh	210	0.85%	New
Independent	Harcharan Singh	132	0.53%	New
Margin of victory		1,512	6.12%	▼1.83
Turnout		24,697	75.56%	▲13.89
Registered electors		33,221		▲41.28
INC gain from Independent		Swing	▲1.29	

=== Assembly Election 1972 ===
1972 Himachal Pradesh Legislative Assembly election: Nurpur
Party	Candidate	Votes	%	±%
Independent	Kewal Singh	7,079	49.80%	New
INC	Satya Prakash	5,949	41.85%	▼5.85
CPI	Shankar Singh	1,187	8.35%	▲3.39
Margin of victory		1,130	7.95%	▼18.72
Turnout		14,215	62.09%	▲8.09
Registered electors		23,514		▼0.09
Independent gain from INC		Swing	▲2.10	

=== Assembly Election 1967 ===
1967 Himachal Pradesh Legislative Assembly election: Nurpur
Party	Candidate	Votes	%	±%
INC	K. Singh	5,878	47.70%	New
ABJS	R. Rattan	2,591	21.03%	New
Independent	B. Singh	2,239	18.17%	New
CPI	D. Chand	611	4.96%	New
SWA	S. Kumar	556	4.51%	New
CPI(M)	T. Raj	448	3.64%	New
Margin of victory		3,287	26.67%	
Turnout		12,323	55.73%	
Registered electors		23,535		
INC win (new seat)				

== See also ==
- Nurpur, Himachal Pradesh
- Kangra district
- List of constituencies of Himachal Pradesh Legislative Assembly
