= Pangi Assembly constituency =

Constituency of the Himachal Pradesh legislative assembly in India

Coordinates: 31.59°N 78.28°E

Pangi
- Former constituency for the Himachal Pradesh Legislative Assembly

Constituency details
- Country: India
- Region: North India
- State: Himachal Pradesh
- District: Chamba
- Established: 1952
- Abolished: 1957
- Total electors: 14,588

Pangi Assembly constituency was an assembly constituency in the India state of Himachal Pradesh.

== Members of the Legislative Assembly ==
Election	Member	Party
1952	Daulat Ram	Indian National Congress

== Election results ==
=== Assembly Election 1952 ===
1952 Himachal Pradesh Legislative Assembly election: Pangi
Party	Candidate	Votes	%	±%
INC	Daulat Ram	2,057	54.93%	New
KMPP	Mahajan	1,252	33.43%	New
Independent	Narain Singh	436	11.64%	New
Margin of victory		805	21.50%	
Turnout		3,745	25.67%	
Registered electors		14,588		
INC win (new seat)				
