= Sat Mahajan =

Indian politician

Member of the Himachal Pradesh Legislative Assembly
- In office 2003–2007
- Preceded by: Rakesh Pathania
- Succeeded by: Rakesh Pathania
- Constituency: Nurpur
- In office 1993–1996
- Preceded by: Kewal Singh
- Succeeded by: Ranjit Singh Bakshashi
- Constituency: Nurpur
- In office 1977–1990
- Preceded by: Kewal Singh
- Succeeded by: Kewal Singh
- Constituency: Nurpur

MP, Lok Sabha
- In office 1996–1998
- Preceded by: D. D. Khanoria
- Succeeded by: Shanta Kumar
- Constituency: Kangra

Personal details
- Born: 30 July 1927 Himachal Pradesh, India
- Died: 1 September 2012 (aged 85) New Delhi, India
- Party: Indian National Congress
- Children: Ajay Mahajan
- Occupation: Politician

Sat Mahajan (30 July 1927 – 1 September 2012) was the Rural Development Minister of the Indian state of Himachal Pradesh. He was a politician and a social worker.

== Early life ==
He was born in Nurpur, Kangra District.

Mahajan was the Secretary of the Current Affairs Society during his college years. He was the President of the Nurpur Municipal Committee for five consecutive terms.

He visited Russia on an Indo-Soviet Friendship Mission. He also represented the country in the United Nations as a member of the parliamentary delegation. He was honoured with the Vaikunth Bhai Mehta Award by the Co-Operative Sector on 31 March 2003 in Delhi.

== Political career ==
He was the founder member of Indian Youth Congress. He has represented the Indian National Congress as one of the member delegations in the International Socialist Conference held in Lisbon. He was the President of the Kangra District Congress Committee and Pradesh Congress Committee for three terms. Mahajan was elected to the State Legislative Assembly first in 1977 and then again in 1982, 1985, 1993 and in 2003. He also remained a Member of Parliament for the Kangra Parliamentary Constituency from 1996 to 1998. He was the Revenue Minister of Himachal Pradesh from May 1980 to January 1985. He was also the Transport Minister of Himachal Pradesh (1985-1986), later IPH Minister of Himachal Pradesh (1986-1990). He was the Chairman of Committee on Estimates from 1994 to 1995 and Rural Development Minister from 6 March 2003 onwards.

== Death ==
On 1 September 2012, he died from cardiac arrest at Escort Hospital. He had been hospitalized to undergo an angioplasty earlier that week, but had been discharged after surgery.
