= Mahadev Assembly constituency =

Constituency of the Himachal Pradesh legislative assembly in India

Coordinates: 31.54°N 76.91°E

Mahadev
- Former constituency for the Himachal Pradesh Legislative Assembly

Constituency details
- Country: India
- Region: North India
- State: Himachal Pradesh
- District: Mandi
- Established: 1952
- Abolished: 1957
- Total electors: 12,022

Mahadev Assembly constituency was an assembly constituency in the India state of Himachal Pradesh.

== Members of the Legislative Assembly ==
Election	Member	Party
1952	Karam Singh	Indian National Congress

== Election results ==
=== Assembly Election 1952 ===
1952 Himachal Pradesh Legislative Assembly election: Mahadev
Party	Candidate	Votes	%	±%
INC	Karam Singh	3,311	86.88%	New
Independent	Jai Ram	294	7.71%	New
KMPP	Tej Singh	133	3.49%	New
Independent	L. M. Sharma	73	1.92%	New
Margin of victory		3,017	79.17%	
Turnout		3,811	31.70%	
Registered electors		12,022		
INC win (new seat)				
