= Bhamla Assembly constituency =

Constituency of the Himachal Pradesh legislative assembly in India

Coordinates: 31.57°N 76.78°E

Bhamla
- Former constituency for the Himachal Pradesh Legislative Assembly

Constituency details
- Country: India
- Region: North India
- State: Himachal Pradesh
- Established: 1952
- Abolished: 1957
- Total electors: 14,310

Bhamla Assembly constituency was an assembly constituency in the India state of Himachal Pradesh.

== Members of the Legislative Assembly ==
Election	Member	Party
1952	Sarju Singh	Indian National Congress

== Election results ==
=== Assembly Election 1952 ===
1952 Himachal Pradesh Legislative Assembly election: Bhamla
Party	Candidate	Votes	%	±%
INC	Sarju Singh	1,376	38.82%	New
Independent	Kanshi Nath Alias Kanshi Ram	1,309	36.93%	New
Independent	Tikka Udaibhan Chand	273	7.70%	New
Independent	Narain	239	6.74%	New
ABHM	Bachhittar Singh	182	5.13%	New
KMPP	Chaudhri Ram	166	4.68%	New
Margin of victory		67	1.89%	
Turnout		3,545	24.77%	
Registered electors		14,310		
INC win (new seat)				
