= Ranbir Singh Nikka =

Indian politician

- रणबीर सिंह निक्का

Member of the Himachal Pradesh Legislative Assembly
- Incumbent
- Assumed office 2022
- Constituency: Nurpur

Personal details
- Party: Bhartiya Janata Party

Ranbir Singh Nikka (born 23 January 1978) is an Indian politician.He was born in village baranda, tehsil Nurpur.He is a member of the Himachal Pradesh Legislative Assembly, representing the Nurpur Assembly constituency. He is an ex-Bharatiya Janata Party secretary general.
