= Neeraj Nayar =

Indian politician

Member of the Himachal Pradesh Legislative Assembly
- Incumbent
- Assumed office 8 December 2022
- Preceded by: Pawan Nayyar, BJP
- Constituency: Chamba Assembly constituency

Personal details
- Born: 17 August 1971 (age 54) Mohalla Upper, Julakari Chamba Town, Tehsil & District Chamba, Himachal Pradesh
- Party: Indian National Congress
- Spouse: Bharti Nayar
- Parent: Sagar Chand Nayar Chanchal Nayar
- Occupation: Politician

Neeraj Nayar (born 17 August 1971) is the Indian politician from Himachal Pradesh. He is a member of Himachal Pradesh Legislative Assembly representing Chamba. He won 2022 Himachal Pradesh Legislative Assembly election.

== Early life and education ==
Nayar was born in Chamba. He is the son of Chanchal Nayar and Sagar Chand Nayar. He married Bharti Nayar, and together they have a son and a daughter. He is a graduate and is a businessman.

== Career ==
Nayar served as the president of the District Congress Committee Chamba from 2019 to 2023. He has also been a member of the Steel Consumer Council (Ministry of Steel) from 2011 to 2012 and a member of Nagar Parishad Chamba from 2013 to 2017. He also served as director of J and K gramin bank from 2013 to 2017 and chairman at APMC Chamba from 2013 to 2017. He was the president of the District Chamba Football Association from 2013 to 2017 and is the president of the District Chamba Hockey Association.

He won from Chamba Assembly constituency representing the Indian National Congress in the 2022 Himachal Pradesh Legislative Assembly election. He polled 32,783 votes and defeated his nearest rival, Neelam Nayyar of the Bharatiya Janata Party, by a margin of 7,782 votes.
