= Bikram Singh Jaryal =

Chief Whip of Himachal Pradesh
- In office 27 July 2021 – December 2022
- Governor: Rajendra Vishwanath Arlekar
- Chief Minister: Jai Ram Thakur
- Preceded by: Narinder Bragta

Member of Himachal Pradesh Legislative Assembly
- In office 25 December 2012 – December 2022
- Preceded by: Kuldeep Singh Pathania
- Succeeded by: Kuldeep Singh Pathania
- Constituency: Bhattiyat

Personal details
- Born: 14 May 1961 (age 64) Simbal Ghatta, Chamba, Himachal Pradesh
- Party: Bhartiya Janta Party
- Spouse: Sapna Jaryal
- Children: 3
- Website: Government Website

Bikram Singh Jaryal (born 14 May 1961) is a political leader associated with Bhartiya Janta Party. He served as the Member of Legislative Assembly representing Bhattiyat Constituency in Chamba District in Himachal Pradesh and Chief Whip of Himachal Pradesh Government.
