= Rawalsar Assembly constituency =

Constituency of the Himachal Pradesh legislative assembly in India

Coordinates: 31.63°N 76.83°E

Rewalsar
- Former constituency for the Himachal Pradesh Legislative Assembly

Constituency details
- Country: India
- Region: North India
- State: Himachal Pradesh
- District: Mandi
- Established: 1952
- Abolished: 1957
- Total electors: 14,037

Rewalsar Assembly constituency was an assembly constituency in the India state of Himachal Pradesh.

== Members of the Legislative Assembly ==
Election	Member	Party
1952	Gori Parshad	Indian National Congress

== Election results ==
=== Assembly Election 1952 ===
1952 Himachal Pradesh Legislative Assembly election: Rewalsar
Party	Candidate	Votes	%	±%
INC	Gori Parshad	3,332	51.70%	New
KMPP	Masat Ram	1,984	30.78%	New
ABJS	Besar Ram	484	7.51%	New
Socialist	Muva	365	5.66%	New
Independent	Bikram Singh	280	4.34%	New
Margin of victory		1,348	20.92%	
Turnout		6,445	45.91%	
Registered electors		14,037		
INC win (new seat)				
