= Chini Assembly constituency =

Constituency of the Himachal Pradesh legislative assembly in India

Coordinates: 30.994°N 77.052°E

Chini
- Former constituency for the Himachal Pradesh Legislative Assembly

Constituency details
- Country: India
- Region: North India
- State: Himachal Pradesh
- District: Solan
- Established: 1952
- Abolished: 1957
- Total electors: 12,235

Chini Assembly constituency was an assembly constituency in the India state of Himachal Pradesh.

== Members of the Legislative Assembly ==
Election	Member	Party
1952	Gopal Chand	Independent politician

== Election results ==
=== Assembly Election 1952 ===
1952 Himachal Pradesh Legislative Assembly election: Chini
Party	Candidate	Votes	%	±%
Independent	Gopal Chand	1,146	55.69%	New
INC	Bahadur Chand	912	44.31%	New
Margin of victory		234	11.37%	
Turnout		2,058	16.82%	
Registered electors		12,235		
Independent win (new seat)				
