= Sandhol Assembly constituency =

Constituency of the Himachal Pradesh legislative assembly in India

Coordinates: 31.858°N 76.652°E

Sandhol
- Former constituency No. 0 for the Himachal Pradesh Legislative Assembly

Constituency details
- Country: India
- Region: North India
- State: Himachal Pradesh
- Established: 1952
- Abolished: 1957
- Total electors: 34,057

Sandhol Assembly constituency was an assembly constituency in the India state of Himachal Pradesh.

== Members of the Legislative Assembly ==
Election	Member	Party
1952	Kashmir Singh; Hari Singh	Kisan Mazdoor Praja Party

== Election results ==
=== Assembly Election 1952 ===
1952 Himachal Pradesh Legislative Assembly election: Sandhol
Party	Candidate	Votes	%	±%
KMPP	Kashmir Singh	3,878	24.61%	New
KMPP	Hari Singh	3,323	21.08%	New
INC	Rama	3,312	21.01%	New
INC	Hari Ram	2,879	18.27%	New
Independent	Rup Lal	842	5.34%	New
ABJS	Jai Ram	809	5.13%	New
Independent	Anup Singh	718	4.56%	New
Margin of victory		555	3.52%	
Turnout		15,761	46.28%	
Registered electors		34,057		
KMPP win (new seat)				
