= List of Lok Sabha members from Himachal Pradesh =

District lies in Constituencies

Following is the list of members of Parliament in Lok Sabha from Himachal Pradesh.

== Present members ==
Keys: BJP (4)

No.	Constituency	Name of elected M.P.	Party affiliation	Ref.
1	Kangra	Dr. Rajeev Bharadwaj	Bharatiya Janata Party	
2	Mandi	Kangana Ranaut	Bharatiya Janata Party	
3	Hamirpur	Anurag Thakur	Bharatiya Janata Party	
4	Shimla	Suresh Kumar Kashyap	Bharatiya Janata Party	

== See also ==
- List of Rajya Sabha members from Himachal Pradesh
