= Kuldeep Singh Pathania =

Speaker of the Himachal Pradesh Legislative Assembly

16th Speaker of the Himachal Pradesh Legislative Assembly
- Incumbent
- Assumed office 5 January 2023
- Chief Minister: Sukhvinder Singh Sukhu
- Deputy CM: Mukesh Agnihotri
- Deputy Speaker: Vinay Kumar (till 2025)
- Preceded by: Chander Kumar As Pro tem Speaker

Member of the Himachal Pradesh Legislative Assembly
- Incumbent
- Assumed office 8 December 2022
- Preceded by: Bikram Singh Jaryal
- Constituency: Bhattiyat
- In office 6 March 2003 – 25 December 2012
- Preceded by: Kishori Lal
- Succeeded by: Bikram Singh Jaryal
- Constituency: Bhattiyat
- In office 15 December 1993 – 12 March 1998
- Preceded by: Shiv Kumar Upmanyu
- Succeeded by: Kishori Lal
- Constituency: Bhattiyat
- In office 11 March 1985 – 21 March 1990
- Preceded by: Shiv Kumar Upmanyu
- Succeeded by: Shiv Kumar Upmanyu
- Constituency: Bhattiyat

Personal details
- Born: 17 September 1957 (age 69) Chhalara, Himachal Pradesh, India
- Party: Indian National Congress
- Spouse: Mrs. Menna Pathania
- Children: 1 Son
- Education: B.Sc., LLB
- Alma mater: University of Lucknow, Himachal Pradesh University
- Profession: Politician, Advocate and agriculturist

Kuldeep Singh Pathania (born 17 September 1957) is an Indian politician and member of the Indian National Congress, He is the current 16th Speaker of the Himachal Pradesh Legislative Assembly since 2023.

== Early life and education ==
Pathania is the son of Late Shri Baldev Singh Pathania and Smt. Brahmi Devi. He pursued his education at H.P. University, earning a B.Sc. degree, and later obtained an L.L.B. from Lucknow University. Married to Smt. Neena Pathania, the couple has one son. Apart from his political endeavors, Kuldeep Singh Pathania is an advocate and agriculturist.

== Political career ==
Having been an active member of the Congress party since his college days, Pathania dedicated himself to organizing farmers and laborers in the Bhattiyat Constituency. He played a crucial role in raising awareness about their legitimate rights and championing social harmony. Additionally, he provided free legal aid to the underprivileged.

Pathania practiced law from 1980 to 1985, 1990 to 1993, and 1998 to 2003 at the District Court Chamba & Himachal Pradesh Administrative Tribunal, Shimla.
