= Kasauli Assembly constituency =

Legislative Assembly constituency in Himachal Pradesh State, India

Coordinates: 30.9°N 76.97°E

Kasauli
- Constituency No. 54 for the Himachal Pradesh Legislative Assembly

Constituency details
- Country: India
- Region: North India
- State: Himachal Pradesh
- District: Solan
- Lok Sabha constituency: Shimla
- Established: 1967
- Total electors: 68,932
- Reservation: SC

Member of Legislative Assembly
- 14th Himachal Pradesh Legislative Assembly
- Incumbent Vinod Kumar Sultanpuri
- Party: Indian National Congress
- Elected year: 2022

Kasauli is one of the 68 assembly constituencies of Himachal Pradesh a northern Indian state. Kasauli is also part of Shimla Lok Sabha constituency.

== Members of the Legislative Assembly ==
Year	Member	Party
1977	Chaman Lal	Janata Party
1982	Raghu Raj	Indian National Congress
1985	Raghu Raj	Indian National Congress
1990	Satya Pal Kamboj	Bharatiya Janata Party
1993	Raghu Raj	Indian National Congress
1998	Raghu Raj	Indian National Congress
2003	Raghu Raj	Indian National Congress
2007	Dr. Rajiv Saizal	Bharatiya Janata Party
2012	Dr. Rajiv Saizal	Bharatiya Janata Party
2017	Dr. Rajiv Saizal	Bharatiya Janata Party
2022	Vinod Sultanpuri	Indian National Congress

== Election results ==
=== Assembly Election 2022 ===
2022 Himachal Pradesh Legislative Assembly election: Kasauli
Party	Candidate	Votes	%	±%
INC	Vinod Sultanpuri	28,200	52.10%	▲4.75
BJP	Dr. Rajiv Saizal	21,432	39.60%	▼8.66
AAP	Harmel Singh	1,809	3.34%	New
Rashtriya Devbhumi Party	Rajeev Kumar Kaundel	1,677	3.10%	New
NOTA	Nota	348	0.64%	▼0.38
Independent	Om Prakash	331	0.61%	New
Himachal Jan Kranti Party	Rajinder	211	0.39%	New
BSP	Ram Rattan	117	0.22%	New
Margin of victory		6,768	12.50%	▲11.60
Turnout		54,125	78.52%	▲2.21
Registered electors		68,932		▲7.30
INC gain from BJP		Swing	▲3.85	

=== Assembly Election 2017 ===
2017 Himachal Pradesh Legislative Assembly election: Kasauli
Party	Candidate	Votes	%	±%
BJP	Dr. Rajiv Saizal	23,656	48.25%	▲1.17
INC	Vinod Sultanpuri	23,214	47.35%	▲0.33
CPI	Virender Kumar Kashyap	652	1.33%	New
NOTA	None of the Above	503	1.03%	New
Independent	Rajeev Kumar Kaundal	329	0.67%	New
Swabhiman Party	Keshav Kumar	321	0.65%	New
Margin of victory		442	0.90%	▲0.84
Turnout		49,025	76.31%	▲2.38
Registered electors		64,245		▲12.04
BJP hold		Swing	▲1.17	

=== Assembly Election 2012 ===
2012 Himachal Pradesh Legislative Assembly election: Kasauli
Party	Candidate	Votes	%	±%
BJP	Dr. Rajiv Saizal	19,960	47.08%	▼7.12
INC	Vinod Sultanpuri	19,936	47.03%	▲8.97
CPI(M)	Karam Dass	837	1.97%	New
AITC	Ram Swaroop	791	1.87%	New
SP	Shakun Chauhan	408	0.96%	New
BSP	Raja Ram	354	0.84%	▼2.35
Margin of victory		24	0.06%	▼16.09
Turnout		42,394	73.93%	▲6.86
Registered electors		57,343		▼2.57
BJP hold		Swing	▼7.12	

=== Assembly Election 2007 ===
2007 Himachal Pradesh Legislative Assembly election: Kasauli
Party	Candidate	Votes	%	±%
BJP	Dr. Rajiv Saizal	21,396	54.20%	▲17.56
INC	Raghu Raj	15,022	38.05%	▼8.34
CPI	Kamlesh Kumari	1,782	4.51%	New
BSP	Som Dutt	1,256	3.18%	▲1.19
Margin of victory		6,374	16.15%	▲6.40
Turnout		39,477	67.07%	▼1.43
Registered electors		58,856		▲4.57
BJP gain from INC		Swing	▲7.81	

=== Assembly Election 2003 ===
2003 Himachal Pradesh Legislative Assembly election: Kasauli
Party	Candidate	Votes	%	±%
INC	Raghu Raj	17,886	46.39%	▲1.73
BJP	Virender Kashyap	14,127	36.64%	▲10.00
HVC	Vinod Kumar	3,491	9.05%	▼17.97
Independent	Jai Ram	1,545	4.01%	New
BSP	Kiran Bala	766	1.99%	New
Independent	Bachan Singh	390	1.01%	New
SP	Shakun Chouhan	352	0.91%	▲0.16
Margin of victory		3,759	9.75%	▼7.88
Turnout		38,557	68.57%	▲5.03
Registered electors		56,284		▲13.07
INC hold		Swing	▲1.73	

=== Assembly Election 1998 ===
1998 Himachal Pradesh Legislative Assembly election: Kasauli
Party	Candidate	Votes	%	±%
INC	Raghu Raj	14,113	44.66%	▼13.44
HVC	Chaman Lall	8,541	27.03%	New
BJP	Satya Pal Kamboj	8,418	26.64%	▼11.36
Independent	Som Dutt	290	0.92%	New
SP	Shakun	238	0.75%	New
Margin of victory		5,572	17.63%	▼2.46
Turnout		31,600	64.89%	▼2.22
Registered electors		49,780		▲13.44
INC hold		Swing	▼13.44	

=== Assembly Election 1993 ===
1993 Himachal Pradesh Legislative Assembly election: Kasauli
Party	Candidate	Votes	%	±%
INC	Raghu Raj	16,750	58.10%	▲21.61
BJP	Virender Kashyap	10,956	38.00%	▼18.65
JD	Kirpal Dharampuri	775	2.69%	New
BSP	Sardar Bachan Singh	348	1.21%	New
Margin of victory		5,794	20.10%	▼0.06
Turnout		28,829	66.34%	▲15.50
Registered electors		43,881		▲10.11
INC gain from BJP		Swing	▲1.45	

=== Assembly Election 1990 ===
1990 Himachal Pradesh Legislative Assembly election: Kasauli
Party	Candidate	Votes	%	±%
BJP	Satya Pal Kamboj	11,333	56.65%	New
INC	Raghu Raj	7,301	36.50%	▼14.94
JP	Chhitroo Ram Chandel	836	4.18%	▼5.99
Independent	Bhagwan Dass	142	0.71%	New
Independent	Uma Dutt	140	0.70%	New
Independent	Chaman Lal	129	0.64%	New
Margin of victory		4,032	20.15%	▲4.36
Turnout		20,005	50.48%	▼11.34
Registered electors		39,853		▲32.60
BJP gain from INC		Swing	▲5.21	

=== Assembly Election 1985 ===
1985 Himachal Pradesh Legislative Assembly election: Kasauli
Party	Candidate	Votes	%	±%
INC	Raghu Raj	9,514	51.44%	▼2.29
Independent	Chaman Lal	6,593	35.65%	New
JP	Kripal Dharampuri	1,880	10.16%	▼7.99
CPI(M)	Naurata Ram	335	1.81%	New
Independent	Beli Ram	112	0.61%	New
Margin of victory		2,921	15.79%	▼19.78
Turnout		18,496	62.13%	▼2.17
Registered electors		30,055		▲6.37
INC hold		Swing	▼2.29	

=== Assembly Election 1982 ===
1982 Himachal Pradesh Legislative Assembly election: Kasauli
Party	Candidate	Votes	%	±%
INC	Raghu Raj	9,672	53.73%	▲19.86
JP	Kirpal Singh	3,268	18.15%	▼19.15
BJP	Sat Pal	3,064	17.02%	New
LKD	Virender	1,805	10.03%	New
Independent	Telu Ram Baidwan	106	0.59%	New
Margin of victory		6,404	35.58%	▲32.14
Turnout		18,001	64.51%	▲7.05
Registered electors		28,255		▲14.91
INC gain from JP		Swing	▲16.43	

=== Assembly Election 1977 ===
1977 Himachal Pradesh Legislative Assembly election: Kasauli
Party	Candidate	Votes	%	±%
JP	Chaman Lal	5,197	37.31%	New
INC	Krishan Datt	4,718	33.87%	New
Independent	Pat Ram Gulhari	1,477	10.60%	New
Independent	Raghu Raj	1,265	9.08%	New
Independent	Prem Singh	1,130	8.11%	New
Independent	Nathu Ram	82	0.59%	New
Margin of victory		479	3.44%	
Turnout		13,931	57.29%	
Registered electors		24,588		
JP win (new seat)				

== See also ==
- List of constituencies of the Himachal Pradesh Legislative Assembly
- Solan district
- Kasauli
