= Anand Sharma =

Indian politician (born 1953)

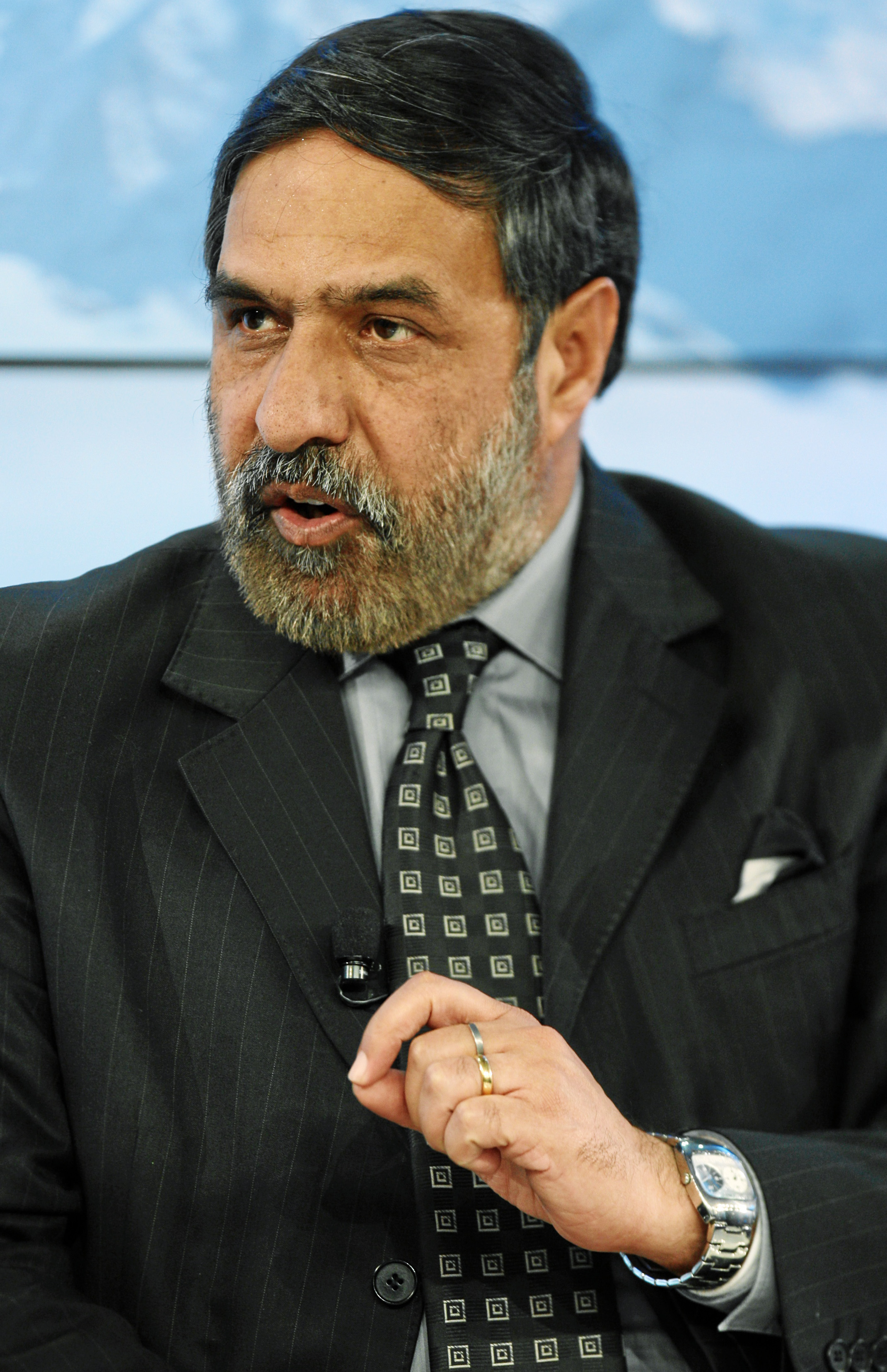
- Sharma at Davos World Economic Forum in 2012

Deputy Leader of the Opposition in Rajya Sabha
- In office 8 June 2014 – 2 April 2022
- Chairman: Mohammad Hamid Ansari; Venkaiah Naidu
- Leader of the Opposition: Ghulam Nabi Azad; Mallikarjun Kharge
- Preceded by: M. J. Akbar
- Succeeded by: P. Chidambaram (interim)

Member of Parliament, Rajya Sabha
- In office 3 April 2016 – 2 April 2022
- Succeeded by: Sikander Kumar
- Constituency: Himachal Pradesh
- In office 5 July 2010 – 9 March 2016
- Constituency: Rajasthan
- In office 3 April 2004 – 2 April 2010
- Constituency: Himachal Pradesh
- In office 10 April 1984 – 9 April 1990
- Constituency: Himachal Pradesh

Union Minister of Commerce and Industry
- In office 22 May 2009 – 26 May 2014
- Prime Minister: Manmohan Singh
- Preceded by: Kamal Nath
- Succeeded by: Nirmala Sitharaman

Union Minister of State for Information and Broadcasting
- In office 18 October 2008 – 22 May 2009
- Prime Minister: Manmohan Singh
- Preceded by: M. H. Ambareesh
- Succeeded by: Choudhury Mohan Jatua

Union Minister of State for External Affairs
- In office 29 January 2006 – 22 May 2009
- Prime Minister: Manmohan Singh
- Preceded by: Rao Inderjit Singh
- Succeeded by: Preneet Kaur

Personal details
- Born: 5 January 1953 (age 73) Shimla, Punjab, India (present-day Himachal Pradesh, India)
- Party: Indian National Congress
- Spouse: Zenobia Sharma
- Education: Faculty of Law, Himachal Pradesh University
- Occupation: Politician
- Profession: Lawyer

Anand Sharma (born 5 January 1953) is an Indian politician and former Union Cabinet Minister in charge of Commerce and Industry and Textiles in the Government of India. Since June 2014, Sharma was the Deputy Leader of opposition in Rajya Sabha, the upper house of the Indian Parliament until 2022. He contested the Kangra Lok Sabha constituency in 2024, but lost.

== Early life and education ==
Anand Sharma is the son of P. A. Sharma and Prabha Rani Sharma and was born in Shimla, Punjab, India. He was educated at R.P.C.S.D.B. College (now R.K.M.V. College), Shimla and Faculty of Law, Himachal Pradesh University, Shimla.

== Career ==
Sharma was a prominent leader in the student and youth movement in India, a founder member of the Congress Party's students wing the NSUI. He was also a former President of the Indian Youth Congress. Sharma asserts that the country needed investment in the manufacturing sector and the cost of credit must be brought down for this purpose. In February 2012, Sharma led a business delegation of more than 120 people to Pakistan for improving trade ties. During this visit, he discussed the revision of the existing visa bilateral agreement, signed in 1974, with his Pakistani counterpart Makhdoom Muhammad Ameen Faheem, to facilitate travel by bona fide businessmen from both the countries.

During his tenure, India's first National Manufacturing policy (NMP) in 2011, was rolled out. The policy envisaged establishment of greenfield integrated manufacturing cities; NIMZ-National Investment and Manufacturing Zones. Sixteen NIMZ were notified.

He was one of the ministers responsible for National Investment Policy. During his tenure, India allowed 100% FDI in Single Brand retail and opened up Multi Brand retail to Foreign Investors.

Post Global Economic Crisis, India emerged as an alternative destination for Foreign Investors and during Anand Sharma's five years tenure received 190 bn USD as FDI.

Anand Sharma participated at the IXth WTO Ministerial Meeting in Bali in December, 2013. Bali Ministerial, resulted in the first ever agreement, since the establishment of the WTO including the Trade Facilitation Agreement (TFA).

He helped in convening of an International Conference in Delhi in November, 2014, to commemorate the 125th Birth Anniversary of Jawaharlal Nehru- Independent India's first Prime Minister. He edited the book "Remembering Jawaharlal Nehru".

He is one of the few who opposed his party's caste-based politics, suggesting that the Congress party leader Rahul Gandhi's policies would only further entrench the caste-system system in the country. He is claimed to have said that -"...such a move would amount to endorsing 'identity politics'..." and urged the party to 'eschew the radical posturing of regional and caste-based organisations'. In his letter right before the general elections (on 19 March 2024) to Congress party President - Mallikarjun Kharge, he wrote - "In my considered view, a caste census cannot be a panacea nor a solution for unemployment and prevailing inequalities. A fundamental departure from time-honoured policy on this critical and sensitive subject has major long-term national implications. As a party with an inclusive approach, the Congress should strive to reclaim its role as builder of national consensus and build a harmonious society." The Congress party nonetheless used its caste-based politics to win 99 seats in 2024 general elections to the Lower House of Indian Parliament.

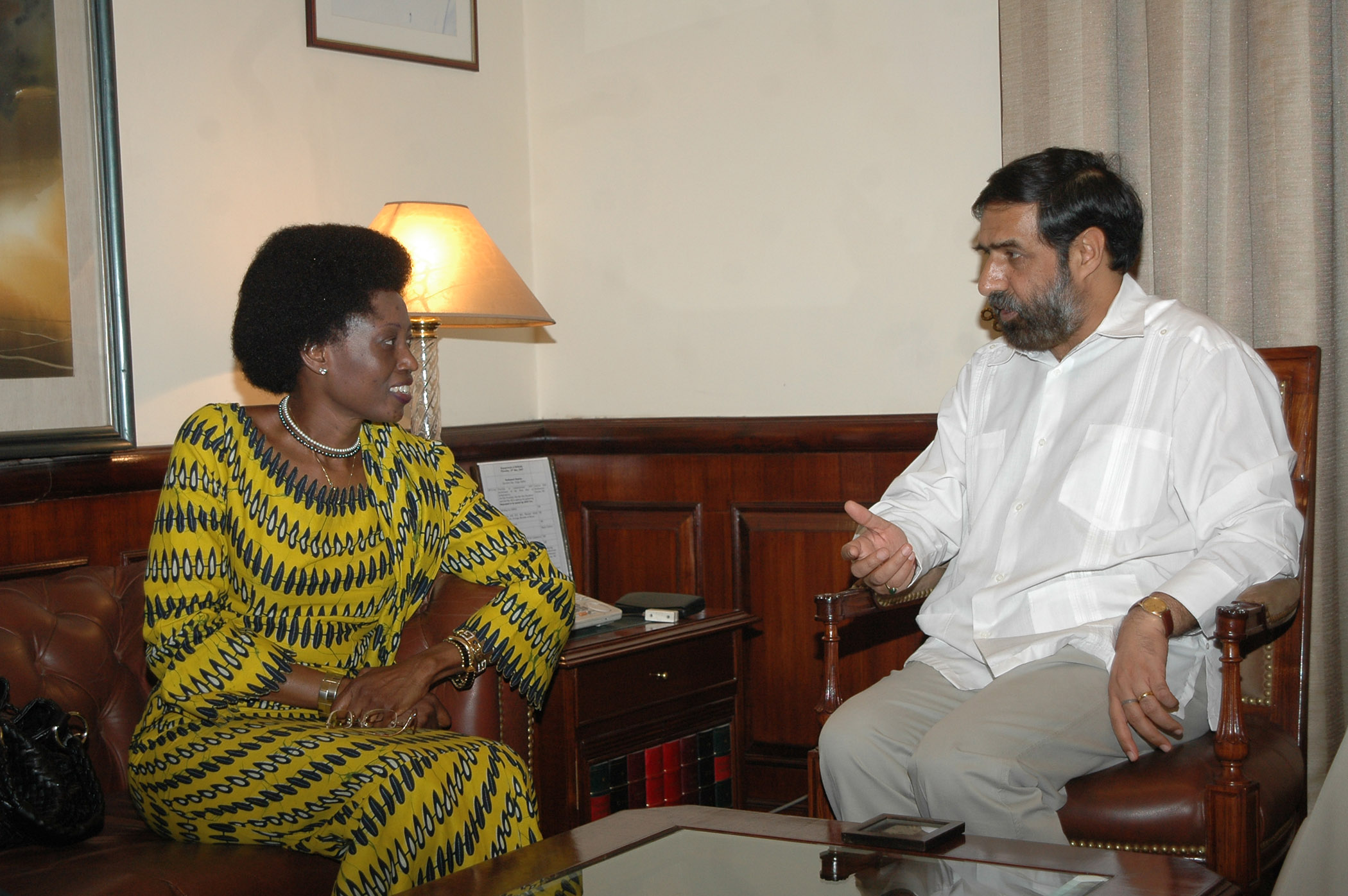
Meeting between Anand Sharma and Mariam Boni Diallo, in New Delhi on May 10, 2007.

=== MP Rajya Sabha ===
==== Parliamentary Committees ====
From 2020 till 2022, he was the chair person of the Parliamentary Standing Committee on Home Affairs.

== Electoral History ==
=== Rajya Sabha ===
Position	Party	Constituency	From	To	Tenure
Member of Parliament, Rajya Sabha (1st Term)	INC(I)	Himachal Pradesh	10 April 1984	9 April 1990	5 years, 364 days
Member of Parliament, Rajya Sabha (2nd Term)	INC	Himachal Pradesh	3 April 2004	2 April 2010	5 years, 364 days
Member of Parliament, Rajya Sabha (3rd Term)	INC	Rajasthan	5 July 2010	7 March 2016	5 years, 246 days
Member of Parliament, Rajya Sabha (4th Term)	INC	Himachal Pradesh	3 April 2016	2 April 2022	5 years, 364 days

== Positions held ==
- 1984–86 Member, Committee on Petitions, Rajya Sabha from Himachal Pradesh
- 1985–88 Member, Joint Parliamentary Committee on Lok Pal Bill
- 1986–89 Nominated to the Panel of Vice-Chairmen, Rajya Sabha
- 1987–88 Member, Consultative Committee for the Ministry of Defence (India)
- 1988–90 Member, Committee on Government Assurances Member, Press Council of India
- April 2004 Elected to Rajya Sabha from Himachal Pradesh
- Aug. 2004 – Jan. 2006 Member, Parliamentary Standing Committee on Defence;
- Aug. 2004 – Jan. 2006 Member, Consultative Committee for the Ministry of External Affairs;
- Aug. 2004 – Jan. 2006 Member, Joint Committee on Salaries and Allowances of Members of Parliament
- Aug. 2004 – July 2006 Member, Business Advisory Committee
- Oct. 2004 – Jan. 2006 Ministry of External Affairs (India)
- 29 Jan. 2006 – 22 May 2009 Minister of State in the Ministry of External Affairs
- 22 May 2009 – 20 May 2014 Minister of Commerce and Industry
- July 2010 Re-elected to Rajya Sabha from Rajasthan, resigned 7 March 2016
- 12 July 2011 – Minister of Textiles (Additional Charge)
- 14 Mar 2016 Re-elected to Rajya Sabha from Himachal Pradesh
- Sept. 2016 - Aug. 2017 Chairman, Personnel, Public Grievances, Law & Justice
- 1 Sept. 2017 - 25 May 2019 Chairman, Science & Technology, Environment and Forests
- 13 Sept. 2019 - 2022 Chairman, Standing Committee on Home Affairs

== Personal life ==
Anand Sharma married Dr. Zenobia on 23 February 1987. They have two sons. He is associated with a number of social and sports organizations and also an all India NGO in disability sector.

== Awards ==
=== Foreign honours ===
- Ghana:
  - Companion of the Order of the Volta (10 November 2008)
- Ivory Coast:
  - Commander of the National Order of the Ivory Coast (14 January 2009)
- South Africa:
  - Special Award for contribution in strengthening India-South Africa relations on the occasion of 150 Years of the First Arrival of Indians in South Africa.

== Publications ==
1. India's Indira, 2018
2. Remembering Jawaharlal Nehru, 2016
3. Journey of a Nation, 2011
4. Gandhian Way, 2007

Political offices
Preceded by Kamal Nath	Minister of Commerce and Industry; 2009–2014	Succeeded by Nirmala Sitharaman (Minister of State (Independent Charge))
