= Satyavati Dang =

Indian politician

Satyavati Dang was an Indian politician and member of the Indian National Congress. She was a member of the Rajya Sabha from 1968 to 1974 when Himachal Pradesh became state. Dang was the president of the Himachal Pradesh Congress Committee from 1964 to 1969

== Personal Life ==
She was second wife of first Chief Minister of Himachal Pradesh Dr. Yashwant Singh Parmar.

== Death ==
She died on 25 February 2010 at Indira Gandhi Medical College in Shimla after prolonged illness.
