= Rajiv Saizal =

Indian politician

Dr. Rajiv Saizal

Social Justice and Empowerment, Corporate Minister, Government of Himachal Pradesh
- In office 27 December 2017 – 8 December 2022

Personal details
- Born: 11 July 1971 (age 54) Haripur Khol, Sirmaur district
- Party: Bharatiya Janata Party
- Spouse: Dr. Renu Saizal
- Children: 1

Dr. Rajiv Saizal (born 11 July 1971) is an Indian politician and former Health & Family Welfare and Ayurveda Minister of Government of Himachal Pradesh. Saizal previously served as a member of the Himachal Pradesh Legislative Assembly from the Kasauli constituency in Solan district. He is a member of the Bharatiya Janata Party.
