= 1952 Himachal Pradesh Legislative Assembly election =

Indian state legislative election

- 1952

36 seats in the Himachal Pradesh Legislative Assembly 19 seats needed for a majority
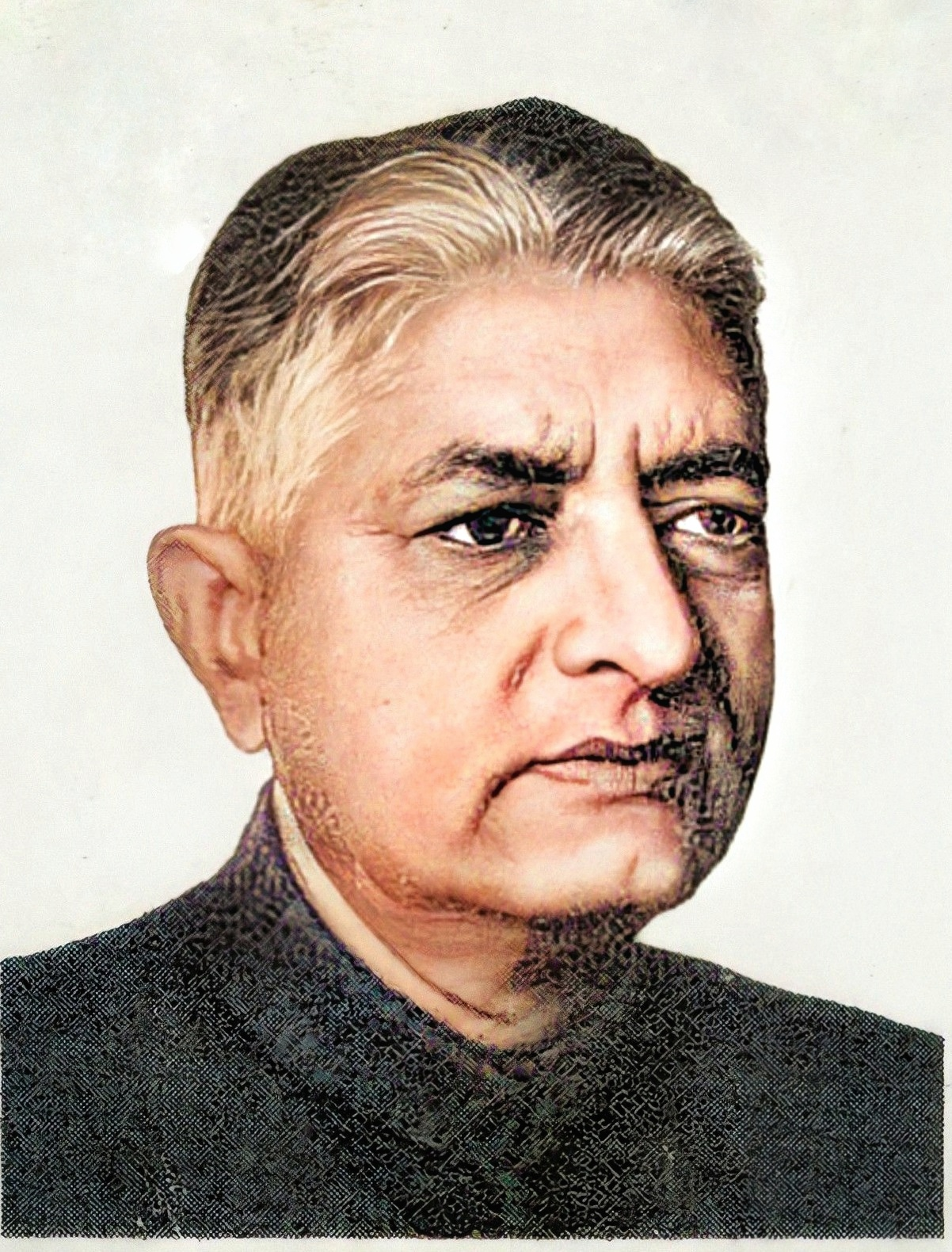

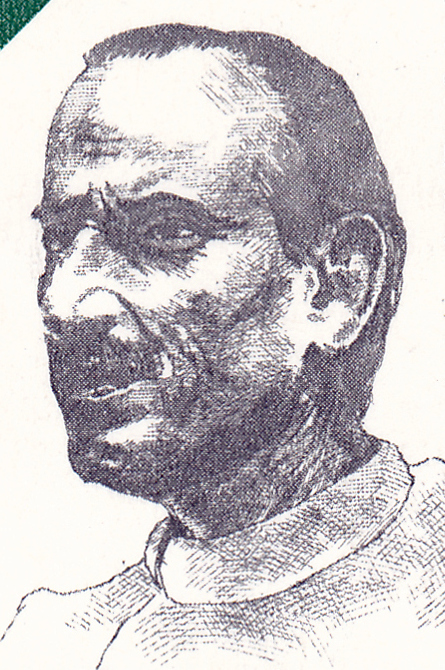
	Majority party	Minority party
Leader	Yashwant Singh Parmar	Jivatram Kripalani
Party	INC	KMPP
Seats won	24	3
Popular vote	47.25%	14.69%
CM before election
Office established
CM
Yashwant Singh Parmar
INC

Himachal Pradesh in India (1951)

Legislative Assembly elections were held in Himachal Pradesh in 1952. The Indian National Congress won a majority of seats, and Yashwant Singh Parmar became the Chief Minister.

== Constituencies ==
The Himachal Pradesh Legislative Assembly consisted of 36 seats, distributed in eight two-member constituencies and twenty single-member constituencies. A total of 135 contestants were in the fray for these 36 seats.

== Results ==
Summary of results of the 1952 Himachal Pradesh Legislative Assembly election
Political party	Flag	Seats Contested	Won	% of Seats	Votes	Vote %
Indian National Congress		35	24	66.67	84,819	47.25
Kisan Mazdoor Praja Party		22	3	8.33	26,371	14.69
Scheduled Caste Federation		9	1	2.78	10,352	5.77
Independent		36	8	22.22	47,746	26.6
Total seats		36	Voters	7,13,554	Turnout	1,79,515 (25.16%)

== Elected members ==
#	Constituency	Reserved for (SC/ST/None)	Member	Party
1	Solan	None	Ram Dass	Scheduled Castes Federation
1	Solan	None	Hira Singh Pal	Independent
2	Kasumpti	None	Hitendra Sen	Independent
3	Suni	None	Sita Ram	Indian National Congress
4	Kumarsain	None	Ram Dayal	Independent
5	Theog	None	Jiwanoo	Kisan Mazdoor Praja Party
5	Theog	None	Devi Ram	Indian National Congress
6	Jubbal	None	Bala Nand	Indian National Congress
7	Rohru	None	Padam Dev	Indian National Congress
8	Rajgarh	None	Ghan Shyam	Independent
9	Rampur	None	Hardayal Singh	Indian National Congress
9	Rampur	None	Bhagat Ram	Indian National Congress
10	Chini	None	Gopal Chand	Independent
11	Bhamla	None	Sarju Singh	Indian National Congress
12	Rawalsar	None	Pandit Gauri Prasad	Indian National Congress
13	Mahadev	None	Karam Singh	Indian National Congress
14	Chachiot	None	Piru	Indian National Congress
14	Chachiot	None	Krishna Chandar	Indian National Congress
15	Kersog	None	Rattan Singh	Indian National Congress
16	Sunder Nagar	None	Baldev Chand	Indian National Congress
17	Sadar Mandi	None	Krishna Nand Swami	Independent
18	Joginder Nagar	None	Besar Ram	Indian National Congress
19	Sandhol	None	Hari Singh	Kisan Mazdoor Praja Party
19	Sandhol	None	Kashmir Singh	Kisan Mazdoor Praja Party
20	Churah	None	Vidya Dhar	Indian National Congress
20	Churah	None	Avtar Chand	Indian National Congress
21	Chamba	None	Chattar Singh	Indian National Congress
22	Bhattiyat	None	Jaiwant Ram	Indian National Congress
23	Bharmour	None	Gurditta Mal	Independent
24	Pangi	None	Daulat Ram	Indian National Congress
25	Nahan	None	Tapinder Singh	Indian National Congress
26	Paonta	None	Shiva Nand	Indian National Congress
27	Pachhad	None	Jiwnu	Indian National Congress
27	Pachhad	None	Yashwant Singh Parmar	Indian National Congress
28	Reinka	None	Partap Singh	Indian National Congress
28	Reinka	None	Dharam Singh	Independent

== State Reorganization ==
Under States Reorganisation Act, 1956, Himachal Pradesh became a Union Territory on 1 November 1956, under the direct administration of the President of India and the Himachal Pradesh Legislative Assembly was abolished simultaneously. Under Punjab Reorganisation Act, 1966, following area of Punjab State namely Simla, Kangra, Kulu and Lahul and Spiti Districts, Nalagarh tehsil of Ambala District, Lohara, Amb and Una kanungo circles, some area of Santokhgarh kanungo circle and some other specified area of Una tehsil of Hoshiarpur District besides some parts of Dhar Kalan Kanungo circle of Pathankot tehsil of Gurdaspur District; were merged with Himachal Pradesh on 1 November 1966 and the next legislative elections were held in 1967.
