= Sikander Kumar =

Indian politician

Dr. Sikander Kumar

Member of Parliament, Rajya Sabha
- Incumbent
- Assumed office 3 April 2022
- Preceded by: Anand Sharma
- Constituency: Himachal Pradesh

Vice Chancellor, Himachal Pradesh University
- In office 3 August 2018 – 19 March 2022
- Preceded by: Rajinder S Chauhan
- Succeeded by: Sat Parkash Bansal (Acting)

Personal details
- Born: Hamirpur, Himachal Pradesh
- Party: Bharatiya Janata Party
- Spouse: Jyoti Devi
- Children: 02

Sikander Kumar is an Indian academic, professor and politician of Bharatiya Janata Party (BJP) of Himachal Pradesh. He is currently a Member of Parliament in the Rajya Sabha, the upper house of Indian Parliament, from Himachal Pradesh.

He was 26th Vice Chancellor of Himachal Pradesh University Shimla.

== Political career ==
He has been declared by the BJP as its candidate from Himachal Pradesh for the 2022 Rajya Sabha elections. On 22 March 2022. He was elected unopposed to the Rajya Sabha from Himachal Pradesh on BJP ticket.
