= Rakesh Pathania =

Indian politician

Cabinet Minister, Government of Himachal Pradesh
- In office 30 July 2020 – 8 December 2022
- Cabinet: Jai Ram Thakur ministry
- Chief Minister: Jai Ram Thakur
- Ministry and Departments: Youth Services; Forest; Sports
- Governor: Rajendra Arlekar

Member of the Himachal Pradesh Legislative Assembly
- In office 9 December 2017 – 8 December 2022
- Preceded by: Ajay Mahajan
- Succeeded by: Ranbir Singh
- Constituency: Nurpur
- In office 2007–2012
- Preceded by: Sat Mahajan
- Succeeded by: Ajay Mahajan
- Constituency: Nurpur
- In office 1998–2003
- Preceded by: Ranjit Singh Bakshashi
- Succeeded by: Sat Mahajan
- Constituency: Nurpur

Personal details
- Born: 15 November 1964 (age 61) Ladori, Dist - Kangra, (Himachal Pradesh)
- Party: Bharatiya Janata Party
- Children: 2
- Education: 12th Pass

Rakesh Pathania is an Indian politician and a member of Nurpur (Vidhan Sabha constituency) in Himachal Pradesh for third time. In 2021 Cabinet reshuffle he was sworn in as Cabinet Minister for Forest, Sports and Youth Affairs Bharatiya Janata Party Himachal Pradesh Legislative Assembly.
