= Sri Renukaji Assembly constituency =

Legislative Assembly constituency in Himachal Pradesh State, India

Coordinates: 30.6°N 77.44°E

Sri Renukaji
- Constituency No. 57 for the Himachal Pradesh Legislative Assembly

Constituency details
- Country: India
- Region: North India
- State: Himachal Pradesh
- District: Sirmaur
- Lok Sabha constituency: Shimla
- Established: 2008
- Total electors: 74,365
- Reservation: SC

Member of Legislative Assembly
- 14th Himachal Pradesh Legislative Assembly
- Incumbent Vinay Kumar
- Party: Indian National Congress
- Elected year: 2022

Sri Renukaji is one of the 68 constituencies in the Himachal Pradesh Legislative Assembly of Himachal Pradesh a northern state of India. It is also part of Shimla Lok Sabha constituency. It was established in 2008.

== Members of the Legislative Assembly ==
Year	Member	Picture	Party
2012	Vinay Kumar		Indian National Congress
2017	Vinay Kumar		Indian National Congress
2022	Vinay Kumar		Indian National Congress

== Election results ==
=== Assembly Election 2022 ===
2022 Himachal Pradesh Legislative Assembly election: Sri Renukaji
Party	Candidate	Votes	%	±%
INC	Vinay Kumar	28,642	47.99%	▲6.06
BJP	Narain Singh	27,782	46.55%	▲14.44
Rashtriya Devbhumi Party	Jagmohan Singh	2,092	3.50%	New
AAP	Ram Kishan	686	1.15%	New
NOTA	Nota	485	0.81%	▼0.87
Margin of victory		860	1.44%	▼8.38
Turnout		59,687	80.26%	▲0.31
Registered electors		74,365		▲13.16
INC hold		Swing	▲6.06	

=== Assembly Election 2017 ===
2017 Himachal Pradesh Legislative Assembly election: Sri Renukaji
Party	Candidate	Votes	%	±%
INC	Vinay Kumar	22,028	41.93%	▼6.08
BJP	Balbir Singh	16,868	32.11%	▼14.43
Independent	Hirdaya Ram	12,069	22.97%	New
NOTA	None of the Above	885	1.68%	New
Margin of victory		5,160	9.82%	▲8.35
Turnout		52,540	79.95%	▲3.77
Registered electors		65,716		▲12.67
INC hold		Swing	▼6.08	

=== Assembly Election 2012 ===
2012 Himachal Pradesh Legislative Assembly election: Sri Renukaji
Party	Candidate	Votes	%	±%
INC	Vinay Kumar	21,332	48.01%	New
BJP	Hirdaya Ram	20,677	46.54%	New
CPI(M)	Satpal	1,531	3.45%	New
BSP	Rajesh Kumar	784	1.76%	New
Margin of victory		655	1.47%	
Turnout		44,433	76.18%	
Registered electors		58,325		
INC win (new seat)				

== See also ==
- Sirmour district
- List of constituencies of Himachal Pradesh Legislative Assembly
