= Harsh Mahajan =

Indian politician (born 1955)

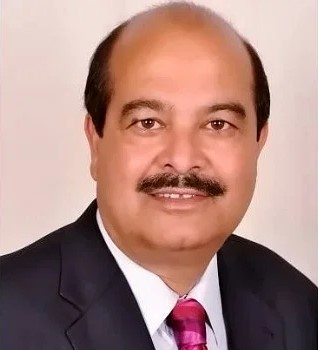

Member of Parliament, Rajya Sabha
- Incumbent
- Assumed office 3 April 2024
- Preceded by: J. P. Nadda
- Constituency: Himachal Pradesh

Cabinet Minister of Government of Himachal Pradesh
- In office 2003 - 2008

Member of the Himachal Pradesh Legislative Assembly
- In office 1993-2008

Personal details
- Born: 12 December 1955 (age 70)
- Party: Bharatiya Janata Party
- Other political affiliations: Indian National Congress (1986-2022)

Harsh Mahajan (ex- Animal Husbandry minister of Himachal Pradesh), is an Indian politician and Member of the Legislative Assembly in the Himachal Pradesh Legislative Assembly.

He was the President of State Youth Congress from 1986 to 1995.

He got elected to the State Legislative Assembly first in November 1993 and again in 1998 and 2003. He has been the Parliamentary Secretary from 1994 to 1998 and has served as Animal Husbandry Minister (at the Cabinet level). He is also a native speaker of English and Hindi.

On 28 September 2022, Himachal Pradesh state Congress working president and former cabinet minister Harsh Mahajan joined Bharatiya Janata Party (BJP).

On 27 February 2024, Mahajan was elected to the Rajya Sabha, India's upper house of Parliament, from Himachal Pradesh as a BJP candidate against the Congress' Abhishek Singhvi.

== Early life and education ==
son of a former Vidhan Sabha Speaker and Cabinet Minister Late Sh. Des Raj Mahajan and was born at Chamba on 12 December 1955. Completed schooling from St. Edwards School in 1971. He has a B. Com. and MBA. He studied at Sriram College of Commerce, New Delhi and at Delhi University, New Delhi. He married Uma Singh on 7 June 1983.

== Political career ==
- Elected as MLA from Chamba in 1993, 1998 and 2003.
- Served as Chief Parliamentary Secretary (CPS) in the Animal Husbandry Department from 1994 to 1998.
- Later became Cabinet Minister in the Himachal Pradesh Government, holding portfolios including Animal Husbandry.
- Served as Chairman of the Himachal Pradesh State Cooperative Bank from 2012 to 2018.
- Left the Indian National Congress in September 2022 and joined the Bharatiya Janata Party (BJP).
- Elected to the Rajya Sabha from Himachal Pradesh in February 2024 as the BJP candidate.
  - Faced senior Congress leader Abhishek Manu Singhvi in the election; both received 34 votes each, and Mahajan was declared winner by a draw of lots.

== Current Parliamentary Roles ==
- Member, Standing Committee on Energy
- Member, Consultative Committee, Ministry of Road Transport and Highways

== Personal life ==
Harsh Mahajan was born on 12 December 1955 in Chamba, Himachal Pradesh. He is the son of Des Raj Mahajan, the first Industries Minister of Himachal Pradesh. He is fluent in Hindi, English, Punjab and Pahari languages, and is known as an articulate public speaker. He actively contributes to social welfare, cooperative movements, and rural development.
