= Roshan Lal =

Indian politician (1910–1990)

Member of Parliament, Rajya Sabha
- In office 1970–1988
- Constituency: Himachal Pradesh

Personal details
- Born: 18 April 1910
- Died: 1990 (aged 79–80)
- Party: Indian National Congress

Roshan Lal (18 April 1910 – 1990) was an Indian politician. He was a Member of Parliament, representing Himachal Pradesh in the Rajya Sabha the upper house of India's Parliament as a member of the Indian National Congress. Lal died in 1990.
