= Usha Malhotra =

Indian politician (born 1933)

Member of Parliament, Rajya Sabha
- In office 1980–1986
- Constituency: Himachal Pradesh

Personal details
- Born: 6 August 1933
- Party: Indian National Congress

Usha Malhotra (born 6 August 1933) is an Indian politician. She was a Member of Parliament, representing Himachal Pradesh in the Rajya Sabha the upper house of India's Parliament as a member of the Indian National Congress.
