= Bhattiyat Assembly constituency =

Legislative Assembly constituency in Himachal Pradesh State, India

Coordinates: 32.33°N 76.07°E

Bhattiyat
- Constituency No. 5 for the Himachal Pradesh Legislative Assembly

Constituency details
- Country: India
- Region: North India
- State: Himachal Pradesh
- District: Chamba
- Lok Sabha constituency: Kangra
- Established: 1951
- Total electors: 78,980
- Reservation: None

Member of Legislative Assembly
- 14th Himachal Pradesh Legislative Assembly
- Incumbent Kuldeep Singh Pathania
- Party: Indian National Congress
- Elected year: 2022

Bhattiyat Assembly constituency is one of the 68 constituencies in the Himachal Pradesh Legislative Assembly of Himachal Pradesh a northern state of India. Bhattiyat is also part of Kangra Lok Sabha constituency.

== Members of Legislative Assembly ==
Year	Member	Picture	Party
1951	Jaiwant Ram		Indian National Congress
1967	Inder Singh		Bharatiya Jana Sangh
1972	Padma		Indian National Congress
1977	Shiv Kumar Upmanyu		Janata Party
1982	Shiv Kumar Upmanyu		Indian National Congress
1985	Kuldeep Singh Pathania		Indian National Congress
1990	Shiv Kumar Upmanyu		Janata Dal
1993	Kuldeep Singh Pathania		Independent
1998	Kishori Lal		Bharatiya Janata Party
2003	Kuldeep Singh Pathania		Independent
2007	Kuldeep Singh Pathania		Indian National Congress
2012	Bikram Singh Jaryal		Bharatiya Janata Party
2017	Bikram Singh Jaryal		Bharatiya Janata Party
2022	Kuldeep Singh Pathania		Indian National Congress

== Election results ==
=== Assembly Election 2022 ===
2022 Himachal Pradesh Legislative Assembly election: Bhattiyat
Party	Candidate	Votes	%	±%
INC	Kuldeep Singh Pathania	25,989	43.73%	▲2.84
BJP	Bikram Singh Jaryal	24,422	41.10%	▼12.46
Independent	Nirmal Singh Pandey	7,741	13.03%	New
Hindu Samaj Party	Amrita Chaudhry	607	1.02%	New
NOTA	Nota	468	0.79%	▼0.42
AAP	Naresh Kumar	197	0.33%	New
Margin of victory		1,567	2.64%	▼10.03
Turnout		59,424	72.83%	▼3.16
Registered electors		81,594		▲14.05
INC gain from BJP		Swing	▼9.83	

=== Assembly Election 2017 ===
2017 Himachal Pradesh Legislative Assembly election: Bhattiyat
Party	Candidate	Votes	%	±%
BJP	Bikram Singh Jaryal	29,119	53.56%	▲15.82
INC	Kuldeep Singh Pathania	22,234	40.90%	▲3.39
NOTA	None of the Above	655	1.20%	New
Independent	Rahul Ranpatia	624	1.15%	New
Independent	Nagesh Kumar	485	0.89%	New
Margin of victory		6,885	12.66%	▲12.43
Turnout		54,367	75.99%	▲2.43
Registered electors		71,545		▲9.73
BJP hold		Swing	▲15.82	

=== Assembly Election 2012 ===
2012 Himachal Pradesh Legislative Assembly election: Bhattiyat
Party	Candidate	Votes	%	±%
BJP	Bikram Singh Jaryal	18,098	37.74%	▲0.88
INC	Kuldeep Singh Pathania	17,987	37.50%	▼0.09
Independent	Bhupinder Singh Chauhan	9,870	20.58%	New
CPI(M)	Sudesh Kumari	960	2.00%	New
Independent	Sushil Kumar Dhiman	549	1.14%	New
BSP	Kalu Ram	482	1.01%	▼0.98
Margin of victory		111	0.23%	▼0.50
Turnout		47,960	73.56%	▼1.42
Registered electors		65,199		▲9.74
BJP gain from INC		Swing	▲0.15	

=== Assembly Election 2007 ===
2007 Himachal Pradesh Legislative Assembly election: Bhattiyat
Party	Candidate	Votes	%	±%
INC	Kuldeep Singh Pathania	16,746	37.59%	▲20.89
BJP	Bhupinder Singh Chauhan	16,421	36.86%	▲17.15
Independent	Bikram Singh Jaryal	10,474	23.51%	New
BSP	Kalu Ram	884	1.98%	New
Margin of victory		325	0.73%	▼4.78
Turnout		44,549	74.98%	▼1.16
Registered electors		59,413		▲12.06
INC gain from Independent		Swing	▲3.04	

=== Assembly Election 2003 ===
2003 Himachal Pradesh Legislative Assembly election: Bhattiyat
Party	Candidate	Votes	%	±%
Independent	Kuldeep Singh Pathania	13,948	34.55%	New
Independent	Bhupinder Singh Chauhan	11,722	29.04%	New
BJP	Kishori Lal	7,957	19.71%	▼39.55
INC	Shiv Kumar	6,744	16.71%	▼19.85
Margin of victory		2,226	5.51%	▼17.18
Turnout		40,371	76.32%	▲3.19
Registered electors		53,020		▲12.42
Independent gain from BJP		Swing	▼24.71	

=== Assembly Election 1998 ===
1998 Himachal Pradesh Legislative Assembly election: Bhattiyat
Party	Candidate	Votes	%	±%
BJP	Kishori Lal	20,387	59.26%	▲30.38
INC	Kuldeep Singh Pathania	12,578	36.56%	▲11.29
HVC	Kalu Ram	862	2.51%	New
JD	Ashok Singh Bist	497	1.44%	New
Margin of victory		7,809	22.70%	▲6.35
Turnout		34,404	74.17%	▲2.76
Registered electors		47,162		▲10.13
BJP gain from Independent		Swing	▲14.03	

=== Assembly Election 1993 ===
1993 Himachal Pradesh Legislative Assembly election: Bhattiyat
Party	Candidate	Votes	%	±%
Independent	Kuldeep Singh	13,595	45.23%	New
BJP	Brij Lal	8,681	28.88%	New
INC	Shiv Kumar	7,596	25.27%	▼8.79
Independent	Bhagat Ram	187	0.62%	New
Margin of victory		4,914	16.35%	▼11.53
Turnout		30,059	70.98%	▲8.30
Registered electors		42,825		▲5.09
Independent gain from JD		Swing	▼16.71	

=== Assembly Election 1990 ===
1990 Himachal Pradesh Legislative Assembly election: Bhattiyat
Party	Candidate	Votes	%	±%
JD	Shiv Kumar	15,620	61.94%	New
INC	Kuldeep Singh Pathania	8,589	34.06%	▼13.77
Independent	Bishamber Das	840	3.33%	New
Independent	Virender Singh	170	0.67%	New
Margin of victory		7,031	27.88%	▲18.92
Turnout		25,219	62.61%	▼5.23
Registered electors		40,751		▲26.10
JD gain from INC		Swing	▲14.11	

=== Assembly Election 1985 ===
1985 Himachal Pradesh Legislative Assembly election: Bhattiyat
Party	Candidate	Votes	%	±%
INC	Kuldeep Singh Pathania	10,374	47.83%	▼9.08
Independent	Shiv Kumar	8,430	38.87%	New
BJP	Amar Singh	2,853	13.15%	▼26.28
Margin of victory		1,944	8.96%	▼8.52
Turnout		21,690	67.89%	▲5.79
Registered electors		32,316		▲4.47
INC hold		Swing		

=== Assembly Election 1982 ===
1982 Himachal Pradesh Legislative Assembly election: Bhattiyat
Party	Candidate	Votes	%	±%
INC	Shiv Kumar	10,796	56.91%	New
BJP	Amar Singh	7,480	39.43%	New
LKD	Jagdish	695	3.66%	New
Margin of victory		3,316	17.48%	▼42.94
Turnout		18,971	62.19%	▲17.64
Registered electors		30,932		▲13.86
INC gain from JP		Swing	▼17.92	

=== Assembly Election 1977 ===
1977 Himachal Pradesh Legislative Assembly election: Bhattiyat
Party	Candidate	Votes	%	±%
JP	Shiv Kumar	8,881	74.83%	New
Independent	Jagdish Chand	1,710	14.41%	New
Independent	Digti Ram `	1,277	10.76%	New
Margin of victory		7,171	60.42%	▲48.64
Turnout		11,868	44.28%	▲16.52
Registered electors		27,166		▲7.90
JP gain from INC		Swing	▲27.00	

=== Assembly Election 1972 ===
1972 Himachal Pradesh Legislative Assembly election: Bhattiyat
Party	Candidate	Votes	%	±%
INC	Padma	3,272	47.84%	▲19.09
INC(O)	Jagdish	2,466	36.05%	New
Independent	Amar Singh	961	14.05%	New
Independent	Daya Chand	141	2.06%	New
Margin of victory		806	11.78%	▲4.95
Turnout		6,840	27.93%	▼10.68
Registered electors		25,178		▲12.75
INC gain from ABJS		Swing	▲12.25	

=== Assembly Election 1967 ===
1967 Himachal Pradesh Legislative Assembly election: Bhattiyat
Party	Candidate	Votes	%	±%
ABJS	I. Singh	3,008	35.59%	New
INC	D. Chand	2,430	28.75%	▼25.02
Independent	K. Kishore	1,953	23.11%	New
Independent	Shiv Kumar	1,061	12.55%	New
Margin of victory		578	6.84%	▼19.08
Turnout		8,452	39.55%	▲16.14
Registered electors		22,330		▲42.30
ABJS gain from INC		Swing	▼18.18	

=== Assembly Election 1952 ===
1952 Himachal Pradesh Legislative Assembly election: Bhattiyat
Party	Candidate	Votes	%	±%
INC	Jaiwant Ram	1,832	53.77%	New
Independent	Madho Ram ( S/O Nand Lal )	949	27.85%	New
Independent	Madho Ram ( S/O Damodar )	361	10.60%	New
KMPP	Pritam Singh	265	7.78%	New
Margin of victory		883	25.92%	
Turnout		3,407	21.71%	
Registered electors		15,692		
INC win (new seat)				

== See also ==
- Kangra district
- List of constituencies of Himachal Pradesh Legislative Assembly
