= Pawan Nayyar =

Indian politician

Pawan Nayyar is an Indian politician of the Bharatiya Janata Party (BJP) and is a member of the legislative assembly (MLA) from Chamba, Himachal Pradesh.
