= Chandan Sharma =

Indian politician

Member of Parliament, Rajya Sabha
- In office 1986-1992
- Constituency: Himachal Pradesh

Personal details
- Born: 10 June 1948 (age 77)
- Party: Indian National Congress

Chandan Sharma is an Indian politician. He was a Member of Parliament, representing Himachal Pradesh in the Rajya Sabha, the upper house of India's Parliament, as a member of the Indian National Congress.
