= Yashwant Singh Parmar =

Indian politician (1906–1981)

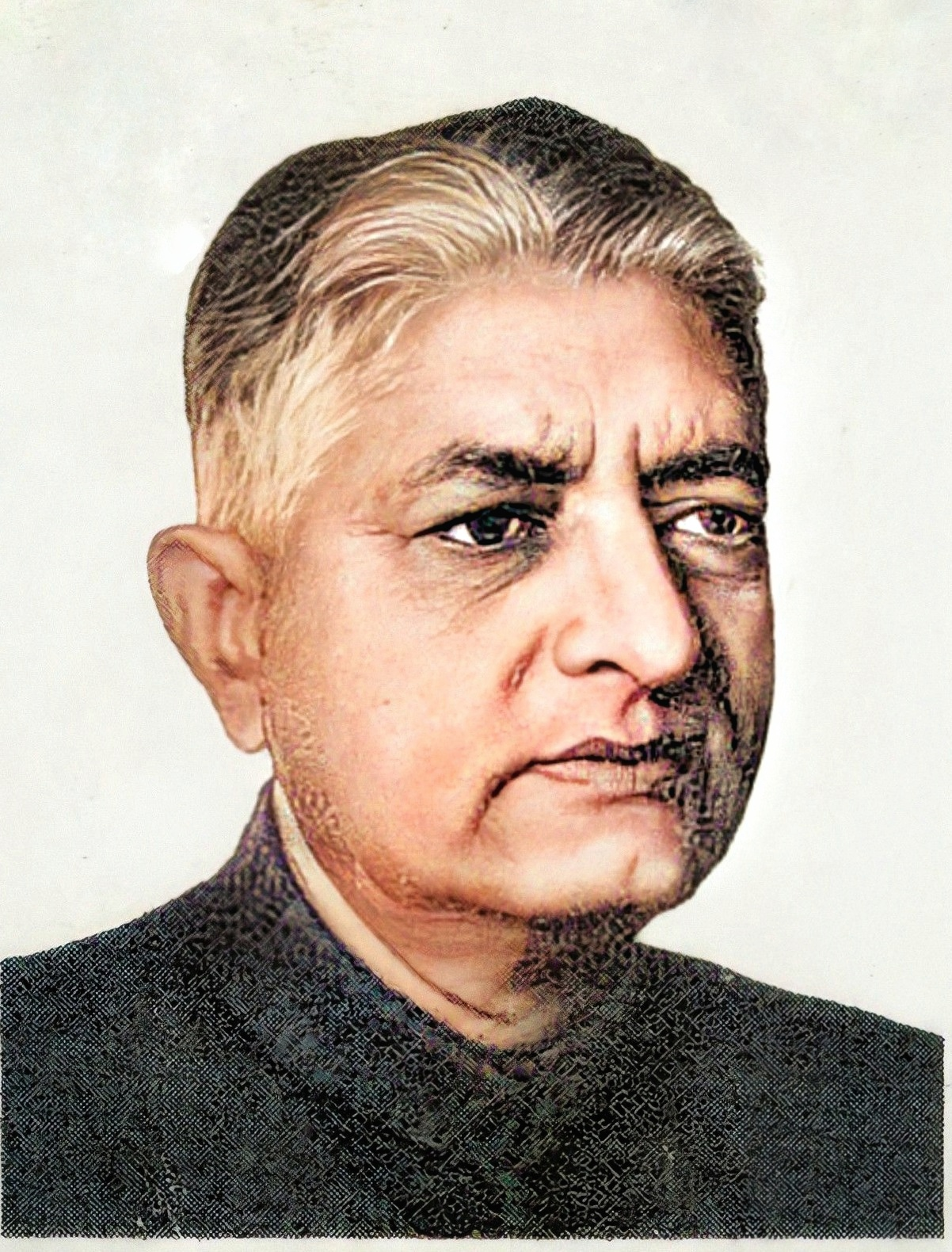

1st Chief Minister of Himachal Pradesh
- In office 1 July 1963 – 28 January 1977
- Governor: S. Chakravarti
- Lieutenant Governor: Bhagwan Sahay; V. Viswanathan; Om Parkash; Kanwar Bahadur Singh
- Preceded by: Office Reestablished
- Succeeded by: Thakur Ram Lal
- In office 8 March 1952 – 31 October 1956
- Lieutenant Governor: Major General Kumar Shri Himmatsinhji Jadeja; Bajrang Bahadur Singh
- Preceded by: Office Established
- Succeeded by: Office Abolished

Personal details
- Born: 4 August 1906 Chanhalag, Sirmur State, British India
- Died: 2 May 1981 (aged 74) Shimla, Himachal Pradesh, India
- Party: Indian National Congress
- Spouse: Satyavati Dang
- Children: 4
- Education: Lucknow University; Forman Christian College
- Occupation: Politician

Yashwant Singh Parmar (4 August 1906 – 2 May 1981) was an Indian politician. He was a leader of the Indian National Congress and the first Chief Minister of Himachal Pradesh state. Upon the formation of the constituent assembly of India in 1946, he represented Himachal Pradesh in the constituent assembly. For his key role in the formation of the Himachal Pradesh state, from the 1940s until 1977, Parmar is hailed as the architect, the founder, or the creator of the Himachal Pradesh state. In Hindi, he is widely referred to as 'Himachal Nirmata' (the creator of Himachal').

== Personal life ==
Parmar was born on 4 August 1906 in Chanalag village, in the princely state of Sirmaur. He was the son of a prominent local family, his father being the secretary to the then ruler of Sirmaur. He did all his schooling from Nahan. He attended the Forman Christian College in Lahore, where he obtained a B.A. (Honours) in 1926. He then went to Canning College in Lucknow, where he obtained an LL.B and an MA in 1928. He obtained a PhD from Lucknow University in 1944, on polyandry in the Himalayas. Parmar served as a magistrate for the Sirmaur court from 1930 to 1937, and as a session judge from 1937 to 1940. Parmar wrote the book Polyandry in the Himalayas, which was published in 1975. Parmar died on 2 May 1981 at the Snowdon Hospital in Shimla.

=== Family ===
Dr. Parmar married twice. On 26 January 1924, he married Chandravati Chauhan, who came from a village near Aligarh. He had four sons from this marriage. Chandravati died in 1969. In 1974, he married Satyavati Dang, a Rajya Sabha member and one of the daughters of the orchardist Satyanand Stokes. Satyavati Parmar, who had two daughters from her earlier marriage, died in 2010.

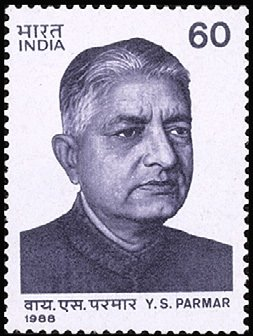
Stamp issued in honour of Dr. Y.S. Parmar.

== Political career ==
For several years in the 1940s, Dr. Y.S. Parmar was active in the Praja Mandal movements in the region that would later become the Himachal Pradesh state. In this movement, he led the Hill State People's Conference and led a Satyagrah movement in the Suket state, which were instrumental in the creation of the Himachal Pradesh province in 1948.

In 1948, Parmar was nominated as a member of the All India Congress Committee and later made the adviser of the Chief Commissioner of the newly formed Himachal Pradesh province. He served as the president of the Himachal Pradesh Congress Committee over 1948–50. He served as the first Chief Minister of Himachal Pradesh, from 24 March 1952 to 31 October 1956.

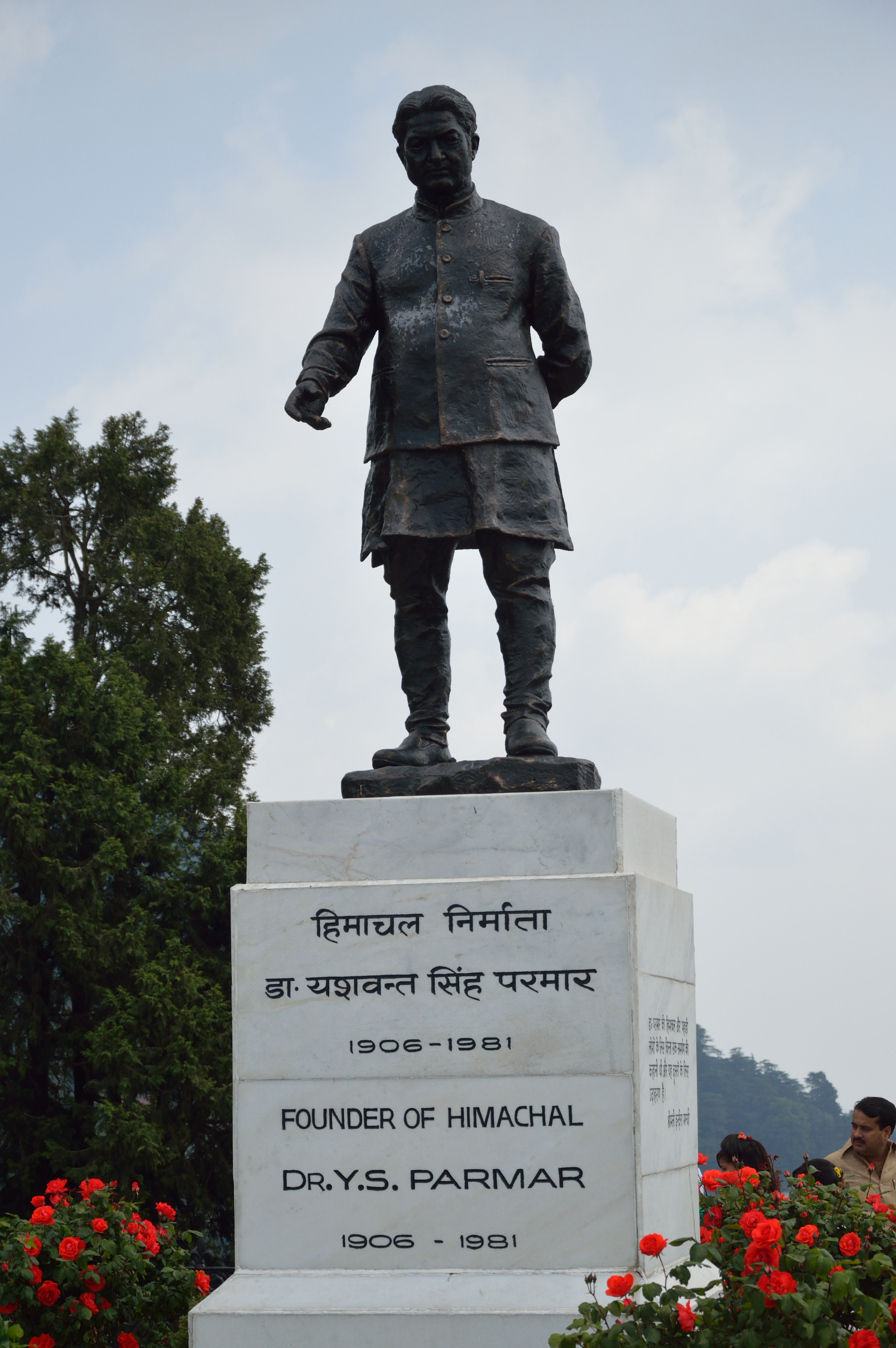
The statue of Dr. Y.S. Parmar on The Ridge, Shimla.

A major threat to the further development of Himachal Pradesh into a state came early on in the 1950s, in the form of strong efforts from both the centre and the powerful Punjab state to merge this relatively new political entity with Punjab. On the one hand, these efforts were fueled by a concern of the centre to stem the growth of regionalism, particularly language-based regionalism. On the other hand, Punjab desired to include these hilly regions within its territory, wherein it had financed and facilitated, with the help of central funds, the construction of major hydroelectric projects which primarily benefited the plains, including those of Punjab. Himachali political elites of the time feared that this would result in the economic and political subjugation of the hilly regions under Punjabi administration, mirroring the recently ended colonial subjugation of the British. Parmar strongly resisted the merging of Himachal Pradesh with Punjab, as recommended by the States Reorganization Committee in 1956. In protest, he resigned from the post of Chief Minister, and Himachal Pradesh became a Union Territory.

Parmar again became the Chief Minister of Himachal Pradesh on 1 July 1963 and he was in office until 28 January 1977. It was during this long period that Himachal Pradesh finally became a full-fledged state of the Republic of India, on 25 January 1971. Parmar is credited with giving Himachal Pradesh its present form, and for his pioneering emphasis, in Himachal, on the vital roles of planned multi-sectoral development and road connectivity in the process of developing social, economic, and cultural coherence and progress in this state.

Towards the end of his term, however, Parmar's differences with Sanjay Gandhi led to the former's resignation, and his return to his hometown Baghthan in the year 1977.

=== Criticism ===
The then Pradesh Congress President Kunj Behari Lal Butail, from Kangra, alleged discrimination against the merged areas of Himachal Pradesh.

Other political opponents of Parmar included Dr. Salig Ram and Kr. Inder Singh.

== Honours ==
- The Dr. Yashwant Singh Parmar University of Horticulture and Forestry, established in 1985 in Solan, is named after Dr. Parmar.
- The Himachal Pradesh University has a Dr. Y.S. Parmar Chair, and an institution named Parmar Peeth, to nurture studies on various aspects of Himachal Pradesh's societies, cultures, languages, and politics.
- The Government Medical College and Hospital in Nahan is named after him.
- The Government Postgraduate College in Nahan is named after him.
- The Government Senior Secondary School at Dhaneta, Nadaun, is named after him.
- In 1988, the Government of India issued a 60 paise postage stamp in honour of Dr. Parmar.
- A statue bearing his likeness was installed on The Ridge, Shimla, on 4 August 1984.
- A statue bearing his likeness was installed in village Chanalag (where he was born) in district Sirmaur, Himachal Pradesh, on 15 August 2015.
- The annual Yashwant Singh Parmar Sahitya Award is named after him.
- The Department of Agriculture of the Himachal Pradesh government renamed its scheme for fostering the production of vegetables under protected cultivation as 'Dr. Y.S. Parmar Kisan Swarozgar Yojna'.
