= Lila Devi =

Indian politician (1919–1972)

Member of Parliament, Rajya Sabha
- In office 1956–1962
- Constituency: Himachal Pradesh

Personal details
- Born: 21 March 1919
- Died: c. December 1972 (aged 53)
- Party: Indian National Congress
- Spouse: Sohan Lal

Lila Devi (21 March 1919 – c. December 1972) was an Indian politician. She was a Member of Parliament, representing Himachal Pradesh in the Rajya Sabha the upper house of India's Parliament as a member of the Indian National Congress.

Devi's death was announced on 8 December 1972, at the age of 53.
