= Jagannath Bharadwaj =

Indian politician

Member of Parliament, Rajya Sabha
- In office 2000–2006
- Constituency: Himachal Pradesh

Personal details
- Born: 30 September 1916
- Party: Indian National Congress

Jagannath Bharadwaj was an Indian politician. He was a Member of Parliament, representing Himachal Pradesh in the Rajya Sabha the upper house of India's Parliament as a member of the Indian National Congress.
