= Sushil Barongpa =

Indian politician

Member of Parliament, Rajya Sabha
- In office 1988–2000
- Constituency: Himachal Pradesh

Personal details
- Born: 10 March 1947
- Party: Indian National Congress

Sushil Barongpa is an Indian politician. He was a Member of Parliament, representing Himachal Pradesh in the Rajya Sabha the upper house of India's Parliament as a member of the Indian National Congress.
