= List of by-elections to the Himachal Pradesh Legislative Assembly =

Indian state legislative by-elections

The following is a list of by-elections held for the Himachal Pradesh Legislative Assembly, India, since its formation in 1956.

== 12th Assembly ==
=== 2014 ===
2014 Himachal Pradesh Legislative Assembly by-election: Sujanpur
Party	Candidate	Votes	%	±%
BJP	Narinder Thakur	22,993	49.78%	▲30.14
INC	Anita Kumari Rana	22,455	48.62%	▲25.30
BSP	Parveen Thakur	387	0.84%	▲0.27
Independent	Subhash Chand	352	0.76%	New
NOTA	Nota	351	0.76%	New
Margin of victory		538	1.16%	▼30.26
Turnout		46,187	100.00%	▲29.65
Registered electors		46,659		▼28.22
BJP gain from Independent		Swing	▼4.96	

=== 2017 ===
S.No	Date	Constituency	MLA before election	Party before election	Elected MLA	Party after election
36	9 April 2017	Bhoranj	Ishwar Dass Dhiman	Bharatiya Janata Party	Dr Anil Dhiman	Bharatiya Janata Party

== 13th Assembly ==
=== 2019 ===
S.No	Date	Constituency	MLA before election	Party before election	Elected MLA	Party after election
1	21 October 2019	Dharamshala	Kishan Kapoor	Bharatiya Janata Party	Vishal Nehria	Bharatiya Janata Party
2	21 October 2019	Pachhad	Suresh Kumar	Bharatiya Janata Party	Reena Kashyap	Bharatiya Janata Party

=== 2021 ===
S.No	Date	Constituency	MLA before election	Party before election	Elected MLA	Party after election
8	30 October 2021	Fatehpur	Sujan Singh Pathania	Indian National Congress	Bhawani Singh Pathania	Indian National Congress
50	30 October 2021	Arki	Virbhadra Singh	Indian National Congress	Sanjay Awasthy	Indian National Congress
65	30 October 2021	Jubbal-Kotkhai	Narinder Bragta	Bharatiya Janata Party	Rohit Thakur	Indian National Congress

== 14th Assembly ==
=== 2024 ===
Date	Constituency		Previous MLA		Reason	Elected MLA	
1 June 2024	18	Dharamshala	Sudhir Sharma	Indian National Congress	Disqualified on 29 February 2024	Sudhir Sharma	Bharatiya Janata Party
1 June 2024	21	Lahaul and Spiti	Ravi Thakur	Indian National Congress	Disqualified on 29 February 2024	Anuradha Rana	Indian National Congress
1 June 2024	37	Sujanpur	Rajinder Rana	Indian National Congress	Disqualified on 29 February 2024	Ranjit Singh	Indian National Congress
1 June 2024	39	Barsar	Inder Dutt Lakhanpal	Indian National Congress	Disqualified on 29 February 2024	Inder Dutt Lakhanpal	Bharatiya Janata Party
1 June 2024	42	Gagret	Chaitanya Sharma	Indian National Congress	Disqualified on 29 February 2024	Rakesh Kalia	Indian National Congress
1 June 2024	45	Kutlehar	Davinder Kumar Bhutto	Indian National Congress	Disqualified on 29 February 2024	Vivek Sharma	Indian National Congress
10 July 2024	10	Dehra	Hoshyar Singh	Independent	Resigned on 22 March 2024	Kamlesh Thakur	Indian National Congress
10 July 2024	38	Hamirpur	Ashish Sharma	Independent	Resigned on 22 March 2024	Ashish Sharma	Bharatiya Janata Party
10 July 2024	51	Nalagarh	K.L. Thakur	Independent	Resigned on 22 March 2024	Hardeep Singh Bawa	Indian National Congress
