= Sant Ram Sharma =

Indian politician

Pandit Sant Ram

Member of the Himachal Pradesh Legislative Assembly
- In office 5 March 1972 – 27 February 1990
- Preceded by: Bansi Ram
- Succeeded by: Dulo Ram
- Constituency: Baijnath
- In office 11 September 1993 – 30 June 1998
- Preceded by: Dulo Ram
- Succeeded by: Dulo Ram
- Constituency: Baijnath

Personal details
- Born: 14 April 1929 Chobin, Baijnath
- Died: 30 June 1998 (aged 69) Shimla
- Party: Indian National Congress
- Spouse: Nirmala Devi
- Occupation: Agriculturalist

Pandit Sant Ram , commonly known as simply Sant Ram, was an Indian politician. He was elected to the Himachal Pradesh Legislative Assembly from Baijnath constituency first in the 1972 Himachal Pradesh Legislative Assembly election as a member of the Indian National Congress. Sant Ram was re-elected in the 1977, 1982, 1985, 1993, and 1998 legislative elections. He also served as a senior cabinet minister in the Himachal Pradesh Government under Chief Minister Virbhadra Singh, and as president of the Himachal Pradesh Congress Committee. Shri Sant Ram died on 30 June 1998. Shri Dulo Ram was elected from Baijnath in the following by-election. His son, Sudhir Sharma, was born in 1972 and has served as both a minister in the Himachal Pradesh government, and as the MLA for Dharamshala Assembly constituency. Sharma is a member of the Bharatiya Janata Party.
