= Thural Assembly constituency =

Former Legislative Assembly constituency in Himachal Pradesh, India

Coordinates: 31.93°N 76.46°E

Thural
- Former constituency for the Himachal Pradesh Legislative Assembly

Constituency details
- Country: India
- Region: North India
- State: Himachal Pradesh
- District: Kangra district
- Lok Sabha constituency: Kangra
- Established: 1977
- Abolished: 2012
- Reservation: None

Thural was one of the 68 assembly constituencies of Himachal Pradesh a northern Indian state. Thural was also part of Kangra Lok Sabha constituency.

== Members of the Legislative Assembly ==
Year	Member	Party
1977	Gian Chand	Janata Party
1982	Chandresh Kumari Katoch	Indian National Congress
1985	Kanwar Durga Chand	Lokdal
1990	Kanwar Durga Chand	Janata Dal
1993	Ravinder Singh Ravi	Bharatiya Janata Party
1998	Ravinder Singh Ravi	Bharatiya Janata Party
2003	Ravinder Singh Ravi	Bharatiya Janata Party
2007	Ravinder Singh Ravi	Bharatiya Janata Party

== Election results ==
=== Assembly Election 2007 ===
2007 Himachal Pradesh Legislative Assembly election: Thural
Party	Candidate	Votes	%	±%
BJP	Ravinder Singh Ravi	18,512	46.48%	▼3.66
Independent	Jagdish Chand Sapehia	11,833	29.71%	New
INC	Sanjay Rana	4,058	10.19%	▼32.64
BSP	Chameli	1,975	4.96%	▲3.47
LJP	Khushi Ram Bhuria	1,085	2.72%	New
Independent	Navin Chand Katoch	835	2.10%	New
SP	Gian Chand	293	0.74%	▼0.19
Independent	Vijay Kumar	258	0.65%	New
Margin of victory		6,679	16.77%	▲9.46
Turnout		39,828	65.00%	▼6.36
Registered electors		61,275		▲13.72
BJP hold		Swing	▼3.66	

=== Assembly Election 2003 ===
2003 Himachal Pradesh Legislative Assembly election: Thural
Party	Candidate	Votes	%	±%
BJP	Ravinder Singh Ravi	19,278	50.14%	▼4.83
INC	Jagdish Chand Sapehia	16,467	42.83%	▲3.48
Independent	Balwant Singh	1,774	4.61%	New
BSP	Dinesh Kumar	574	1.49%	New
SP	Manikya Dev Chand	357	0.93%	▲0.16
Margin of victory		2,811	7.31%	▼8.31
Turnout		38,450	71.36%	▲3.37
Registered electors		53,883		▲17.53
BJP hold		Swing	▼4.83	

=== Assembly Election 1998 ===
1998 Himachal Pradesh Legislative Assembly election: Thural
Party	Candidate	Votes	%	±%
BJP	Ravinder Singh Ravi	17,132	54.97%	▲6.04
INC	Aishwarya Dev Chand	12,262	39.34%	New
HVC	Sansar Chand	988	3.17%	New
Independent	Dinesh Kumar	420	1.35%	New
SP	Mathur Dass	241	0.77%	New
Margin of victory		4,870	15.63%	▲12.33
Turnout		31,167	68.69%	▼1.14
Registered electors		45,845		▲13.30
BJP hold		Swing	▲6.04	

=== Assembly Election 1993 ===
1993 Himachal Pradesh Legislative Assembly election: Thural
Party	Candidate	Votes	%	±%
BJP	Ravinder Singh Ravi	13,685	48.93%	New
INC	Kanwar Durga Chand	12,764	45.64%	New
BSP	Dhari Ram	992	3.55%	New
	Bhagwan Dass	225	0.80%	New
Independent	Thakur Bhagwan Singh	165	0.59%	New
Margin of victory		921	3.29%	▼25.10
Turnout		27,967	69.66%	▲6.49
Registered electors		40,462		▲4.33
BJP gain from JD		Swing	▼3.05	

=== Assembly Election 1990 ===
1990 Himachal Pradesh Legislative Assembly election: Thural
Party	Candidate	Votes	%	±%
JD	Kanwar Durga Chand	12,626	51.98%	New
INC	Aditya Dev Chand	5,730	23.59%	▼2.23
Independent	Amar Singh	2,359	9.71%	New
Independent	Kartar Chand	1,494	6.15%	New
Independent	Dhari Ram	1,142	4.70%	New
Independent	Gian Chand	281	1.16%	New
Independent	Tek Chand	235	0.97%	New
Independent	Milap Chand Rana	228	0.94%	New
Margin of victory		6,896	28.39%	▼8.09
Turnout		24,290	63.27%	▼0.26
Registered electors		38,784		▲18.95
JD gain from LKD		Swing	▼10.32	

=== Assembly Election 1985 ===
1985 Himachal Pradesh Legislative Assembly election: Thural
Party	Candidate	Votes	%	±%
LKD	Kanwar Durga Chand	12,775	62.30%	▲40.90
INC	Kartar Singh	5,295	25.82%	▼10.80
Independent	Dhari Ram	1,562	7.62%	New
Independent	Tek Chand Rana	722	3.52%	New
Independent	Kuldip Chand Katoch	151	0.74%	New
Margin of victory		7,480	36.48%	▲33.12
Turnout		20,505	63.38%	▼4.06
Registered electors		32,604		▲7.71
LKD gain from INC		Swing	▲25.68	

=== Assembly Election 1982 ===
1982 Himachal Pradesh Legislative Assembly election: Thural
Party	Candidate	Votes	%	±%
INC	Chandresh Kumari Katoch	7,423	36.62%	▲26.89
BJP	Santosh Kumar	6,742	33.26%	New
LKD	Kanwar Durga Chand	4,337	21.40%	New
Independent	Sain Dass Mehra	573	2.83%	New
CPI	Bansi Ram	462	2.28%	New
Independent	Piare Lal	334	1.65%	New
Independent	Banarsi Dass	311	1.53%	New
Margin of victory		681	3.36%	▼39.59
Turnout		20,268	67.87%	▲14.75
Registered electors		30,271		▲0.08
INC gain from JP		Swing	▼18.50	

=== Assembly Election 1977 ===
1977 Himachal Pradesh Legislative Assembly election: Thural
Party	Candidate	Votes	%	±%
JP	Gian Chand	8,705	55.12%	New
Independent	Tara Chand	1,922	12.17%	New
INC	Parkash Chand	1,538	9.74%	New
Independent	Prabhat Chand Parveen	1,059	6.71%	New
Independent	Dhari Ram	604	3.82%	New
Independent	Shambhu Singh	456	2.89%	New
Independent	Piare Lal	447	2.83%	New
Independent	Dasaundi Ram	373	2.36%	New
Independent	Rup Singh	355	2.25%	New
Independent	Jaishi Ram	312	1.98%	New
Margin of victory		6,783	42.95%	
Turnout		15,792	52.88%	
Registered electors		30,248		
JP win (new seat)				

== See also ==
- Thural
- Kangra district
- Kangra (Lok Sabha constituency)
