= Sullah Assembly constituency =

Legislative Assembly constituency in Himachal Pradesh State, India

Coordinates: 32.06°N 76.47°E

Sullah
- Constituency No. 14 for the Himachal Pradesh Legislative Assembly

Constituency details
- Country: India
- Region: North India
- State: Himachal Pradesh
- District: Kangra
- Lok Sabha constituency: Kangra
- Established: 1967
- Total electors: 106,976
- Reservation: None

Member of Legislative Assembly
- 14th Himachal Pradesh Legislative Assembly
- Incumbent Vipin Singh Parmar
- Party: Bharatiya Janata Party
- Elected year: 2022

Sulah Assembly constituency is one of the 68 assembly constituencies of Himachal Pradesh a northern Indian state. It is also part of Kangra Lok Sabha constituency.

== Members of Legislative Assembly ==
Year	Member	Picture	Party
1967	Durga Chand		Bharatiya Jana Sangh
1972	Durga Chand		Bharatiya Jana Sangh
1977	Shanta Kumar		Janata Party
1982	Shanta Kumar		Bharatiya Janata Party
1985	Man Chand		Indian National Congress
1990	Shanta Kumar		Bharatiya Janata Party
1993	Man Chand Rana		Indian National Congress
1995 By-election (Note: By-election)	K. Durga Chand		Indian National Congress
1998	Vipin Singh Parmar		Bharatiya Janata Party
2003	Jagjiwan Paul		Indian National Congress
2007	Vipin Singh Parmar		Bharatiya Janata Party
2012	Jagjiwan Paul		Indian National Congress
2017	Vipin Singh Parmar		Bharatiya Janata Party
2022	Vipin Singh Parmar		Bharatiya Janata Party

== Election results ==
=== Assembly Election 2022 ===
2022 Himachal Pradesh Legislative Assembly election: Sullah
Party	Candidate	Votes	%	±%
BJP	Vipin Singh Parmar	36,670	48.35%	▼5.81
Independent	Jagjiwan Paul	29,558	38.97%	New
INC	Jagdish Chand Sapehia	6,828	9.00%	▼30.55
AAP	Ravinder Singh	963	1.27%	New
Independent	Chander Bhan	760	1.00%	New
NOTA	Nota	394	0.52%	▼0.27
Independent	Suman Kumar	232	0.31%	New
Independent	Rekha Rani	211	0.28%	New
BSP	Suresh Kumar	165	0.22%	▼0.33
Independent	Dr. Swaroop Singh Rana	64	0.08%	New
Margin of victory		7,112	9.38%	▼5.22
Turnout		75,845	70.90%	▼2.41
Registered electors		1,06,976		▲11.27
BJP hold		Swing	▼5.81	

=== Assembly Election 2017 ===
2017 Himachal Pradesh Legislative Assembly election: Sullah
Party	Candidate	Votes	%	±%
BJP	Vipin Singh Parmar	38,173	54.16%	▲9.96
INC	Jagjiwan Paul	27,882	39.56%	▼11.71
Independent	Vishal Singh	972	1.38%	New
Independent	Lekh Raj	728	1.03%	New
NOTA	None of the Above	555	0.79%	New
Independent	Bikram Singh Rana	460	0.65%	New
BSP	Mohinder Singh	388	0.55%	▲0.01
Margin of victory		10,291	14.60%	▲7.53
Turnout		70,486	73.31%	▲3.18
Registered electors		96,145		▲7.67
BJP gain from INC		Swing	▲2.89	

=== Assembly Election 2012 ===
2012 Himachal Pradesh Legislative Assembly election: Sullah
Party	Candidate	Votes	%	±%
INC	Jagjiwan Paul	32,105	51.27%	▲5.31
BJP	Vipin Singh Parmar	27,677	44.20%	▼4.26
CPI(M)	Ashok Kumar Katoch	828	1.32%	▲0.32
HLC	Deepak Nag	677	1.08%	New
AITC	Brij Lal	465	0.74%	New
BSP	Sanjay Kumar	339	0.54%	▼1.40
LJP	Manoj Kumar	316	0.50%	▼1.01
Margin of victory		4,428	7.07%	▲4.57
Turnout		62,619	70.13%	▲0.51
Registered electors		89,293		▲55.49
INC gain from BJP		Swing	▲2.81	

=== Assembly Election 2007 ===
2007 Himachal Pradesh Legislative Assembly election: Sullah
Party	Candidate	Votes	%	±%
BJP	Vipin Singh Parmar	19,375	48.46%	▲14.30
INC	Jagjiwan Paul	18,376	45.96%	▼17.10
BSP	Charan Dev Singh Guleria	776	1.94%	▲1.09
LJP	Lekh Raj	606	1.52%	▲0.81
CPI(M)	Satpal Singh	400	1.00%	New
SP	Suresh Chander	218	0.55%	New
Margin of victory		999	2.50%	▼26.40
Turnout		39,980	69.62%	▼5.17
Registered electors		57,426		▲13.56
BJP gain from INC		Swing	▼14.60	

=== Assembly Election 2003 ===
2003 Himachal Pradesh Legislative Assembly election: Sullah
Party	Candidate	Votes	%	±%
INC	Jagjiwan Paul	23,851	63.06%	▲15.69
BJP	Bipan Singh Parmar	12,921	34.16%	▼13.62
Independent	Kuldeep Singh	353	0.93%	New
BSP	Joginder Singh	321	0.85%	New
LJP	Jagroop Singh	268	0.71%	New
Margin of victory		10,930	28.90%	▲28.49
Turnout		37,820	74.80%	▲6.36
Registered electors		50,569		▲12.56
INC gain from BJP		Swing	▲15.28	

=== Assembly Election 1998 ===
1998 Himachal Pradesh Legislative Assembly election: Sullah
Party	Candidate	Votes	%	±%
BJP	Bipan Singh Parmar	14,690	47.78%	▲3.34
INC	Jagjiwan Paul	14,565	47.38%	▼7.83
HVC	Kamlesh Kumar Sharma	1,251	4.07%	New
SP	Ramdev Panjla	236	0.77%	New
Margin of victory		125	0.41%	▼10.37
Turnout		30,742	69.16%	▼8.71
Registered electors		44,927		▲14.27
BJP gain from INC		Swing	▼7.43	

=== Assembly By-election 1995 ===
1995 Himachal Pradesh Legislative Assembly by-election: Sullah
Party	Candidate	Votes	%	±%
INC	K.Durga Chand	15,154		
BJP	B.S.Parmar	11,897		
Margin of victory		3,257		
INC hold		Swing		

=== Assembly Election 1993 ===
1993 Himachal Pradesh Legislative Assembly election: Sullah
Party	Candidate	Votes	%	±%
INC	Man Chand Rana	16,745	55.21%	▲14.85
BJP	Shanta Kumar	13,478	44.44%	▼12.07
Margin of victory		3,267	10.77%	▼5.38
Turnout		30,328	77.84%	▲8.54
Registered electors		39,317		▲2.09
INC gain from BJP		Swing		

=== Assembly Election 1990 ===
1990 Himachal Pradesh Legislative Assembly election: Sullah
Party	Candidate	Votes	%	±%
BJP	Shanta Kumar	14,930	56.51%	▲8.93
INC	Man Chand Rana	10,664	40.36%	▼9.30
CPI	Pritam Paharia	610	2.31%	▲0.11
Doordarshi Party	Kashmir Singh Vaidya	173	0.65%	New
Margin of victory		4,266	16.15%	▲14.07
Turnout		26,419	69.17%	▼3.56
Registered electors		38,512		▲25.26
BJP gain from INC		Swing	▲6.85	

=== Assembly Election 1985 ===
1985 Himachal Pradesh Legislative Assembly election: Sullah
Party	Candidate	Votes	%	±%
INC	Man Chand Rana	11,018	49.66%	▲7.90
BJP	Shanta Kumar	10,557	47.59%	▼9.29
CPI	Pritam Paharia	488	2.20%	New
Independent	Kashmir Singh Vaidya	122	0.55%	New
Margin of victory		461	2.08%	▼13.03
Turnout		22,185	73.46%	▼1.52
Registered electors		30,745		▲8.65
INC gain from BJP		Swing	▼7.21	

=== Assembly Election 1982 ===
1982 Himachal Pradesh Legislative Assembly election: Sullah
Party	Candidate	Votes	%	±%
BJP	Shanta Kumar	11,857	56.87%	New
INC	Man Chand Rana	8,708	41.77%	New
Independent	Kashmir Singh Vaidya	175	0.84%	New
Margin of victory		3,149	15.10%	▼19.99
Turnout		20,848	74.46%	▲12.87
Registered electors		28,297		▼1.77
BJP gain from JP		Swing	▼10.67	

=== Assembly Election 1977 ===
1977 Himachal Pradesh Legislative Assembly election: Sullah
Party	Candidate	Votes	%	±%
JP	Shanta Kumar	11,832	67.55%	New
CPI	Bidhi Chand	5,685	32.45%	New
Margin of victory		6,147	35.09%	▲13.62
Turnout		17,517	61.59%	▲23.97
Registered electors		28,807		▲16.52
JP gain from ABJS		Swing	▲15.22	

=== Assembly Election 1972 ===
1972 Himachal Pradesh Legislative Assembly election: Sullah
Party	Candidate	Votes	%	±%
ABJS	Durga Chand	4,765	52.32%	▼12.13
INC	Shambhoo Singh	2,810	30.86%	▲1.79
Independent	Prakash Chand	948	10.41%	New
Independent	Pritam Paharia	293	3.22%	New
Independent	Sita Ram	291	3.20%	New
Margin of victory		1,955	21.47%	▼13.92
Turnout		9,107	37.93%	▼18.39
Registered electors		24,722		▼4.02
ABJS hold		Swing	▼12.13	

=== Assembly Election 1967 ===
1967 Himachal Pradesh Legislative Assembly election: Sullah
Party	Candidate	Votes	%	±%
ABJS	Durga Chand	9,169	64.46%	New
INC	P. Singh	4,135	29.07%	New
Independent	D. Singh	629	4.42%	New
Independent	P. Chand	292	2.05%	New
Margin of victory		5,034	35.39%	
Turnout		14,225	57.85%	
Registered electors		25,758		
ABJS win (new seat)				

== See also ==
- List of constituencies of the Himachal Pradesh Legislative Assembly
- Kangra district
