= 1951–52 Indian general election in Punjab =

18 (of 489) seats in the Lok Sabha
- Registered: 6,718,345
- Turnout: 3,717,260 (55.33%)
	First party	Second party
Party	INC	SAD
Seats won	16	2
Popular vote	2,134,586	569,973
Percentage	42.76%	11.42%
Prime Minister before election
Jawaharlal Nehru
INC
Prime Minister after election
Jawaharlal Nehru
INC

The 1951–52 Indian general election was the first democratic national election held in India after Independence, and the polls in Punjab were held for 15 constituencies with 18 seats. The result was a victory for Indian National Congress winning 16 out of the 18 seats. Only 2 seats was won by the Shiromani Akali Dal.

== Results ==
=== By Party ===
Party	Votes	%	Seats
Indian National Congress	2,134,586	42.76	16
Shiromani Akali Dal	569,973	11.42	2
Zamindar Party	291,300	5.83	0
Bharatiya Jana Sangh	279,639	5.60	0
Communist Party of India	251,623	5.04	0
Independents	930,383	18.64	0
Other parties	534,834	10.71	0
Total	4,992,338	100.00	18
Registered voters/turnout	6,718,345	–	

=== By constituency ===
#	Constituency	Turnout	Winner	Party	Runner-up	Party
1	Ambala Simla	200,028	Tek Chand	INC	Sohan Lal	ABJS
2	Karnal	842,918	Virendra Kumar	INC		
2	Karnal	842,918	Subhadra Joshi	INC		
3	Rohtak	253,188	Ranbir Singh	INC	Hari Ram	Zamindar Party
4	Jhajjar Rewari	246,224	Ghamandi Lal	INC	Partap Singh	Zamindar Party
5	Gurgaon	251,946	Thakar Das	INC	Jiwan Khan	Ind
6	Hissar	188,389	Achint Ram	INC	Hardev Sahai	Ind
7	Fazilka Sirsa	214,413	Atma Singh	INC	Gur Raj Singh	SAD
8	Ferozepore Ludhiana	811,732	Bahadur Singh	SAD		
8	Ferozepore Ludhiana	811,732	Lal Singh	SAD		
9	Nawan Shahr	250,375	Baldev Singh	INC	Har Kishan Singh	CPI
10	Jullundur	199,468	Amar Nath	INC	Ajit Singh	SAD
11	Hoshiarpur	799,356	Ram Das	INC		
11	Hoshiarpur	799,356	Diwan Chand	INC		
12	Kangra	159,053	Hem Raj	INC	Yodh Raj	ABJS
13	Gurdaspur	182,413	Teja Singh	INC	Gurbhajan Singh	Ind
14	Tarn Taran	212,396	Surjit Singh	INC	Dalip Singh	CPI
15	Amritsar	180,439	Gurmukh Singh Musaffar	INC	Hukam Singh	SAD

== Bibliography ==
- Volume I, 1951 Indian general election, 1st Lok Sabha
