= Pathania =

Indian clan and surname

Pathania is a surname of Indian origin. It is also a sub-clan of the Tomar (Tanwar/Toor) Rajput clan from northern India. The royal family of Nurpur kingdom of Himachal Pradesh belonged to this clan.

== Notable people ==
People with the surname Pathania, who may or may not be affiliated with the clan, include:

- Anant Singh Pathania, Indian army general and Maha Vir Chakra recipient
- Bhawani Singh Pathania, Indian National Congress politician
- Bhiguraj Pathania, Indian cricketer
- Diwesh Pathania, Indian cricketer
- Rakesh Pathania, Bharatiya Janata Party politician
- Raghbir Singh Pathania, Indian soldier in World War I
- Shivya Pathania, Indian model and television actress
- Sujan Singh Pathania, Indian National Congress politician
- Virender Singh Pathania, Directors General of the Indian Coast Guard
- Virendera Singh Pathania, Indian Air Force pilot, Vir Chakra and Vayusena Medal recipient

== See also ==
- Pathankot, city in Punjab, India named after the clan
- Jarral (Toor)
