= Chander Kumar =

Indian politician (born 1944)

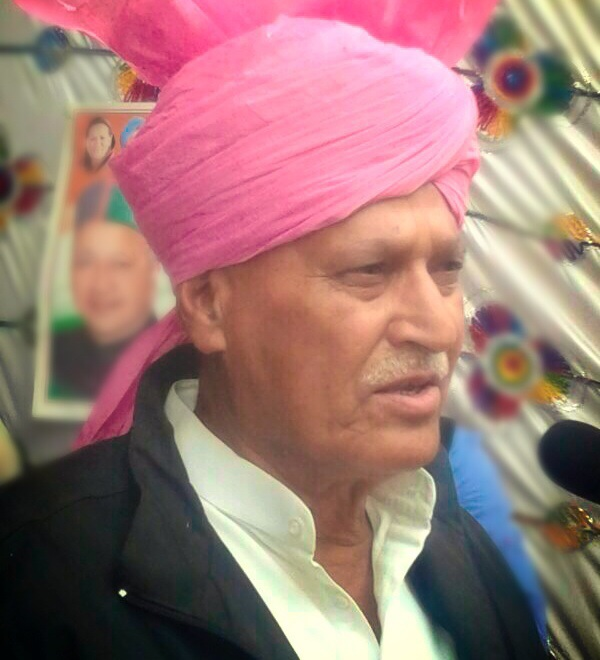

Cabinet Minister, Government of Himachal Pradesh
- Incumbent
- Assumed office 8 January 2023
- Governor: Rajendra Arlekar (2022–2023); Shiv Pratap Shukla (2023–2026); Kavinder Gupta (2026–present)
- Cabinet: Sukhu ministry
- Chief Minister: Sukhvinder Singh Sukhu
- Ministry and Departments: Agriculture; Animal Husbandry

Pro tem Speaker of the Himachal Pradesh Legislative Assembly
- In office 19 December 2022 – 05 January 2023
- Chief Minister: Sukhvinder Singh Sukhu
- Preceded by: Vipin Singh Parmar, BJP
- Succeeded by: Kuldeep Singh Pathania, INC

Member of the Himachal Pradesh Legislative Assembly
- Incumbent
- Assumed office 8 December 2022
- Preceded by: Arjun Singh
- Constituency: Jawali
- In office 1983–1990
- Constituency: Guler constituency
- In office 1993–2004
- Constituency: Guler constituency

Cabinet Minister, Higher Education and Public Relations (Himachal Pradesh)
- In office 2003–2004
- Chief Minister: Virbhadra Singh

Cabinet Minister, Forest & Environment (Himachal Pradesh)
- In office 1998–1999
- Chief Minister: Virbhadra Singh

Cabinet Minister, Irrigation, Public Health, Science & Technology (Himachal Pradesh)
- In office 1993–1998
- Chief Minister: Virbhadra Singh

Cabinet Minister, Power & Projects (Himachal Pradesh)
- In office 1989–1990
- Chief Minister: Virbhadra Singh

Minister of State, Forests (Himachal Pradesh)
- In office 1984–1985
- Chief Minister: Virbhadra Singh

Minister of State, Agriculture (Himachal Pradesh)
- In office 1983–1984
- Chief Minister: Virbhadra Singh

Member of parliament, Lok Sabha
- In office 2004–2009
- Preceded by: Shanta Kumar
- Succeeded by: Rajan Sushant
- Constituency: Kangra

Personal details
- Born: 8 May 1944 (age 82) Dhan, Distt. Kangra (Himachal Pradesh)
- Party: Indian National Congress
- Spouse: Krishna Chaudhary
- Children: Neeraj Bharti, Sonima Bharti
- Education: M.A., M.Ed., LLB Educated at Punjab University, Chandigarh and Himachal Pradesh University, Shimla

Chaudhary Chander Kumar (born 8 May 1944 in Dhan, Kangra) serves as Member of Legislative Assembly (MLA) from Jawali. Previously he was elected as MLA from Guler constituency for 5 terms between 1983 and 2004. He also served as Minister in serving key portfolios like Higher Education, Health, Environment and so on. He represented the Kangra constituency of Himachal Pradesh as a Member of Parliament from 2004 to 2009.

== Early political career ==
Qualifications:

- Bachelor of Arts (HPU)
- 1966: Master Of Arts Geography (Punjab University)
- 1967: M.Ed.
- 1980: LLB (HPU)

== Personal background ==
He was married to Smt. Krishna Chaudhary on 2 March 1976. His son Neeraj Bharti was Chief Parliamentary Secretary (Department of Education) elected from Jawali Constituency of district Kangra, Himachal Pradesh until 2017. His daughter in law Monika Bharti is former Congress Youth President (Himachal Pradesh).

In the November 2022 assembly elections, Kumar was the Indian National Congress candidate from Jawali constituency and won from Sanjay Guleria of the Bhartiya Janta party.

Publications

Articles on land use planning, forests and environment Literary, Artistic & Scientific Accomplishments Himurja; handpump technology for hilly areas

Other Information

Was actively involved in the policy document of Himalayan Sustained Development of Ecology and Forestry Authority; Water- shed programme in the Himalayan Region including Hand pump Technology for driving water supply; Joint Convener, National Convention on Education; taught in St. Beed's College, Shimla, Himachal Pradesh; initiated reform measures for the improvement of higher and technical education in Himachal Pradesh; Vice Chairman, Himachal Pradesh Roadways Transport Corporation (HRTC) 1982-85

== Political career ==
Posts held

- 1951 Secretary, Praja Socialist Party (P.S.P.), Distt. Ballia
- 1982-1984 Minister of State, Agriculture and Forestry, Government of Himachal Pradesh
- 1984-1985 Minister of State, Forests, Government of Himachal Pradesh
- 1985-1989 Member, Committee on Energy Member, Himachal Pradesh Legislative Assembly (four terms)
- 1989-1990 Cabinet Minister, Power and Projects, Government of Himachal Pradesh
- 1993-1998 Cabinet Minister, Irrigation, Public Health, Science and Technology, Government of Himachal Pradesh
- 1998-1999 Cabinet Minister, Forest and Environment, Government of Himachal Pradesh
- 2003-2004 Member, Committee on Estimates Member, Committee on Official Language
- 2004 Elected to 14th Lok Sabha Member, Committee on Tourism Deputy Minister, Higher Education and Public Relations, Government of Himachal Pradesh
- 2007-2009 Member, Standing Committee on Energy
- 2022 onwards Member of Himachal Legislative assembly
- 2022 As pro tem speaker of Himachal Legislative assembly
- 2022 Minister of State, Agriculture and Forestry, Animal Husbandry Government of Himachal Pradesh

== Electoral history ==
=== 2022 ===
Himachal Pradesh Assembly election, 2022: Jawali constituency
Party	Name	Votes	Votes %
Indian National Congress	Chander Kumar	38243	51.22%
Bharatiya Janata Party	Sanjay Kumar Guleria	35212	47.16%
Himachal Jan Kranti Party	Arun Kumar	306	0.41%
Aam Aadmi Party	Baldev Raj	277	0.37%
Bahujan Samaj Party	Bhir Singh	258	0.35%
None of the Above	NOTA	373	0.5%
Margin		3031	4.05%
Total Votes Polled		74669	74.98%
Electors		99,572	

=== 2017 ===
Himachal Pradesh Assembly election, 2017: Guler constituency
Party	Name	Votes	Votes %
Bharatiya Janta Party	Arjun Singh	36,999	55.3%
Indian National Congress	Chander Kumar	28,786	43.0%
Independent	Rakesh Kumar	315	0.5%
Communist Party Of India	Rustam Singh	314	0.5%
Bahujan Samaj Party	Manjana Devi	266	0.4%
Navbharat Ekta Dal	Harbans Lal Dhiman	236	0.4%
Margin		8,213	12.3%
Total Votes Polled		66,916	79.7%
Electors		84,616	

=== 2014 ===
2014 Indian general elections: Kangra
Party	Candidate	Votes	%	±%
BJP	Shanta Kumar	4,56,163	57.06	+8.37
INC	Chander Kumar	2,86,091	35.79	−9.76
AAP	Dr. Rajan Sushant	24,430	3.06	+3.06
BSP	Lal Hussain	5,949	0.74	−1.19
IND.	Bhupinder Mehra	5,585	0.70	+0.70
NOTA	None of the Above	8,704	1.09	+1.09
Majority		1,70,072	21.27	+18.13
Turnout		7,99,445	63.52	+8.37
BJP hold		Swing	+8.37	

=== 2009 ===
2009 Indian general elections: Kangra
Party	Candidate	Votes	%	±%
BJP	Dr. Rajan Sushant	3,22,254	48.69	
INC	Chander Kumar	3,01,475	45.55	
BSP	Col. Narinder Singh Pathania	12,745	1.93	
IND.	Roshan Lal	8,283	1.25	
LJP	Keshab	7,720	1.17	
Majority		20,779	3.14	
Turnout		6,61,847	55.15	
BJP gain from INC		Swing		

=== 2004 ===
2004 Indian general election: Kangra
Party	Candidate Name	Votes	Votes %
Indian National Congress	Chander Kumar	314,555	49.1%
Bharatiya Janta Party	Shanta Kumar	296,764	46.3%
Bahujan Samaj Party	Lt. Col. Shakti Chand Chaudhary ( RETD.)	10,860	1.7%
Independent	Fakir Chand	10,594	1.7%
Samajwadi Party	Roshan Rana	7,092	1.1%
Independent	Dhani Ram	3,312	0.5%
Majority		17,791	2.8%
Turnout		6,40,345	62.0%

=== 2003 ===
Himachal Pradesh Assembly election, 2003: Guler constituency
Party	Name	Votes	Votes %
Indian National Congress	Chander Kumar	21,936	54.5%
Bharatiya Janta Party	Harbans Singh	16,002	39.8%
Samajwadi Party	Joginder Singh Pathania	903	2.2%
Communist Party Of India	Azad Kumar	495	1.2%
Nationalist Congress Party	Malook Singh	350	0.9%
Lok Jan Shakti Party	Pawan Kumar	319	0.8%
Bahujan Samaj Party	Ram Rattan	249	0.6%
Margin		5,934	14.7%
Total Votes Polled		40,308	77.5%
Electors		51,987	

=== 1998 ===
Himachal Pradesh Assembly election, 1998: Guler constituency
Party	Name	Votes	Votes %
Indian National Congress	Chander Kumar	18,674	56.7%
Bharatiya Janta Party	Harbans Singh Rana	13,806	41.9%
Communist Party Of India	Azad Kumar	194	0.6%
Independent	Pratap Chand	113	0.3%
All India Rashtriya Janata Party	Bachittar Singh	109	0.3%
Independent	Shiv Chander Singh	56	0.2%
Margin		4,868	14.6%
Total Votes Polled		33,267	74.3%
Electors		44,800	

=== 1993 ===
Himachal Pradesh Assembly election, 1993: Guler constituency
Party	Name	Votes	Votes %
Indian National Congress	Chander Kumar	19,051	61.3%
Bharatiya Janta Party	Harbans Rana	10,308	33.1%
Independent	Gulshan	941	3.0%
Bahujan Samaj Party	Gurcharandass	595	1.9%
Doordarshi Party	Sunil Kumar	113	0.4%
Independent	Partep Singh	93	0.3%
Margin		8,743	27.9%
Total Votes Polled		31,308	79.2%
Electors		39,548	

=== 1990 ===
Himachal Pradesh Assembly election, 1990: Guler constituency
Party	Name	Votes	Votes %
Bharatiya Janta Party	Harbans Singh Rana	15,140	53.8%
Indian National Congress	Chander Kumar	12,099	43.0%
Bahujan Samaj Party	Gurcharan Dass	499	1.8%
Doordarshi Party	Sunil Kumar	273	1.0%
Independent	Chain Singh Guleria	128	0.5%
Margin		3,041	10.7%
Total Votes Polled		28,389	74.1%
Electors		38,314	

=== 1985 ===
Himachal Pradesh Assembly election, 1985: Guler constituency
Party	Name	Votes	Votes %
Indian National Congress	Chander Kumar	12,223	56.0%
Bharatiya Janta Party	Harbans Singh Rana	9,022	41.3%
Independent	Joginder Singh Pathania	310	1.4%
Independent	Tilak Raj	279	1.3%
Margin		3,201	14.5%
Total Votes Polled		22,037	78.0%
Electors		28,271	

=== 1982 ===
Himachal Pradesh Assembly election, 1982: Guler constituency
Party	Name	Votes	Votes %
Indian National Congress	Chander Kumar	8,867	45.4%
Independent	Harbans Singh Rana	5,775	29.6%
Bharatiya Janta Party	Raghubir Singh	4,035	20.7%
Independent	Parkash Chand	482	2.5%
Lok Dal	Rajinder Singh	159	0.8%
Janta Party	Rakesh Narayana	121	0.6%
Independent	Gurdial	99	0.5%
Margin		3,092	15.6%
Total Votes Polled		19,787	77.3%
Electors		25,598	

=== 1977 ===
Himachal Pradesh Assembly election, 1977: Guler constituency
Party	Name	Votes	Votes %
Janta Party	Harbans Singh	6,649	45.1%
Independent	Chander Kumar	5,905	40.0%
Indian National Congress	Kuldip Singh	1,718	11.6%
Independent	Mani Ram	238	1.6%
Independent	Narinder Kumar	168	1.1%
Independent	Rajender Singh	79	0.5%
Margin		744	5.0%
Total Votes Polled		15,030	65.6%
Electors		22,910	
