= Mulkh Raj =

Indian politician

Mulkh Raj Premi is an Indian politician from Himachal Pradesh. He is a former member of the Himachal Pradesh Legislative Assembly from the Baijnath Assembly constituency representing the Bharatiya Janata Party. Mulkh Raj belongs to the Koli community of Himachal Pradesh.

== Career ==
Raj lost won the Baijinath Assembly constituency in the 2017 Himachal Pradesh Legislative Assembly election representing the Bharatiya Janata Party. He polled 32,102 votes and defeated his nearest rival, to Kishori Lal of the Indian Nationial Congress, by a margin of 12,669 votes.

He contested again on the BJP ticket in the 2022 Himachal Pradesh Legislative Assembly election, but lost to same rival Kishori Lal of the Congress, by a margin of 3,446 votes.
