= Vikram Chand Mahajan =

Indian politician

Vikram Mahajan

Member of Parliament, Lok Sabha
- In office 1967-1977
- Succeeded by: Durga Chand
- In office 1980-1984
- Preceded by: Durga Chand
- Succeeded by: Chandresh Kumari
- Constituency: Kangra, Himachal Pradesh

Personal details
- Born: 27 March 1933 Lahore, Punjab, British India
- Died: 11 August 2016 (aged 83)
- Party: Indian National Congress
- Spouse: Mudhu Mahajan

Vikram Chand Mahajan (27 March 1933 – 11 August 2016) was an Indian politician. He was elected to the Lok Sabha, the lower house of the Parliament of India as a member of the Indian National Congress. He was the son of Mehr Chand Mahajan a former Chief Justice of the Supreme Court of India.
