= Guler Assembly constituency =

Former Legislative Assembly constituency in Himachal Pradesh, India

Coordinates: 32.00°N 76.13°E

Guler
- Former constituency for the Himachal Pradesh Legislative Assembly

Constituency details
- Country: India
- Region: North India
- State: Himachal Pradesh
- District: Kangra
- Lok Sabha constituency: Kangra
- Established: 1967
- Abolished: 2012
- Reservation: None

Guler was one of the 68 assembly constituencies of Himachal Pradesh a northern Indian state. Guler was part of Kangra Lok Sabha constituency. Later, parts of it merged into Jawali.

== Members of the Legislative Assembly ==
| Year | Member | Party |
|---|---|---|
| 1967 | Churamani | Independent |
| 1977 | Harbans Singh Rana | Janata Party |
| 1982 | Chander Kumar | Indian National Congress |
| 1985 | Chander Kumar | Indian National Congress |
| 1990 | Harbans Singh Rana | Bharatiya Janata Party |
| 1993 | Chander Kumar | Indian National Congress |
| 1998 | Chander Kumar | Indian National Congress |
| 2003 | Chander Kumar | Indian National Congress |
| 2004^ | Harbans Singh Rana | Bharatiya Janata Party |
| 2007 | Neeraj Bharti | Indian National Congress |

^By-Poll

== Election results ==
=== Assembly Election 2007 ===
2007 Himachal Pradesh Legislative Assembly election: Guler
| Party | Candidate | Votes | % | ±% |
|---|---|---|---|---|
| INC | Neeraj Bharti | 21,500 | 49.69% | ▲4.16 |
| BJP | Harbans Singh Rana | 17,499 | 40.44% | ▼7.94 |
| BSP | Bhikham Singh | 3,616 | 8.36% | ▲6.80 |
| Independent | Om Parkash | 599 | 1.38% | New |
| Margin of victory | | 4,001 | 9.25% | ▲6.40 |
| Turnout | | 43,270 | 71.79% | ▼1.54 |
| Registered electors | | 60,276 | | ▲13.71 |
| INC gain from BJP | | Swing | ▲1.31 | |

=== Assembly By-election 2004 ===
2004 Himachal Pradesh Legislative Assembly by-election: Guler
| Party | Candidate | Votes | % | ±% |
|---|---|---|---|---|
| BJP | Harbans Singh Rana | 18,806 | 48.38% | ▲8.63 |
| INC | Neeraj Bharti | 17,699 | 45.53% | ▼8.96 |
| Independent | Bhanu Parkash Choudhary | 958 | 2.46% | New |
| BSP | Brahami Devi | 604 | 1.55% | ▲0.94 |
| Independent | Subhash Chand | 541 | 1.39% | New |
| HVC | Lakshman Singh | 265 | 0.68% | New |
| Margin of victory | | 1,107 | 2.85% | ▼11.89 |
| Turnout | | 38,873 | 73.33% | ▼4.10 |
| Registered electors | | 53,010 | | ▲1.97 |
| BJP gain from INC | | Swing | ▼6.12 | |

=== Assembly Election 2003 ===
2003 Himachal Pradesh Legislative Assembly election: Guler
| Party | Candidate | Votes | % | ±% |
|---|---|---|---|---|
| INC | Chander Kumar | 21,936 | 54.49% | ▼2.18 |
| BJP | Harbans Singh Rana | 16,002 | 39.75% | ▼2.14 |
| SP | Joginder Singh Pathania | 903 | 2.24% | New |
| CPI | Azad Kumar | 495 | 1.23% | ▲0.64 |
| NCP | Malook Singh | 350 | 0.87% | New |
| LJP | Pawan Kumar | 319 | 0.79% | New |
| BSP | Ram Rattan | 249 | 0.62% | New |
| Margin of victory | | 5,934 | 14.74% | ▼0.03 |
| Turnout | | 40,254 | 77.53% | ▲3.88 |
| Registered electors | | 51,987 | | ▲16.04 |
| INC hold | | Swing | ▼2.18 | |

=== Assembly Election 1998 ===
1998 Himachal Pradesh Legislative Assembly election: Guler
| Party | Candidate | Votes | % | ±% |
|---|---|---|---|---|
| INC | Chander Kumar | 18,674 | 56.67% | ▼4.58 |
| BJP | Harbans Singh Rana | 13,806 | 41.90% | ▲8.75 |
| CPI | Azad Kumar | 194 | 0.59% | New |
| Margin of victory | | 4,868 | 14.77% | ▼13.34 |
| Turnout | | 32,952 | 74.26% | ▼5.09 |
| Registered electors | | 44,800 | | ▲13.28 |
| INC hold | | Swing | | |

=== Assembly Election 1993 ===
1993 Himachal Pradesh Legislative Assembly election: Guler
| Party | Candidate | Votes | % | ±% |
|---|---|---|---|---|
| INC | Chander Kumar | 19,051 | 61.26% | ▲18.26 |
| BJP | Harbans Singh Rana | 10,308 | 33.14% | ▼20.66 |
| Independent | Gulshan | 941 | 3.03% | New |
| BSP | Gurcharandass | 595 | 1.91% | ▲0.14 |
| Margin of victory | | 8,743 | 28.11% | ▲17.30 |
| Turnout | | 31,101 | 79.16% | ▲5.20 |
| Registered electors | | 39,548 | | ▲3.22 |
| INC gain from BJP | | Swing | ▲7.45 | |

=== Assembly Election 1990 ===
1990 Himachal Pradesh Legislative Assembly election: Guler
| Party | Candidate | Votes | % | ±% |
|---|---|---|---|---|
| BJP | Harbans Singh Rana | 15,140 | 53.80% | ▲12.48 |
| INC | Chander Kumar | 12,099 | 43.00% | ▼12.98 |
| BSP | Gurcharan Dass | 499 | 1.77% | New |
| Doordarshi Party | Sunil Kumar | 273 | 0.97% | New |
| Margin of victory | | 3,041 | 10.81% | ▼3.85 |
| Turnout | | 28,139 | 74.10% | ▼3.79 |
| Registered electors | | 38,314 | | ▲35.52 |
| BJP gain from INC | | Swing | ▼2.18 | |

=== Assembly Election 1985 ===
1985 Himachal Pradesh Legislative Assembly election: Guler
| Party | Candidate | Votes | % | ±% |
|---|---|---|---|---|
| INC | Chander Kumar | 12,223 | 55.98% | ▲10.60 |
| BJP | Harbans Singh Rana | 9,022 | 41.32% | ▲20.67 |
| Independent | Joginder Singh Pathania | 310 | 1.42% | New |
| Independent | Tilak Raj | 279 | 1.28% | New |
| Margin of victory | | 3,201 | 14.66% | ▼1.16 |
| Turnout | | 21,834 | 77.95% | ▲0.90 |
| Registered electors | | 28,271 | | ▲10.44 |
| INC hold | | Swing | ▲10.60 | |

=== Assembly Election 1982 ===
1982 Himachal Pradesh Legislative Assembly election: Guler
| Party | Candidate | Votes | % | ±% |
|---|---|---|---|---|
| INC | Chander Kumar | 8,867 | 45.38% | ▲33.74 |
| Independent | Harbans Singh Rana | 5,775 | 29.56% | New |
| BJP | Raghubir Singh | 4,035 | 20.65% | New |
| Independent | Parkash Chand | 482 | 2.47% | New |
| LKD | Rajinder Singh | 159 | 0.81% | New |
| JP | Rakesh Narayana | 121 | 0.62% | ▼44.44 |
| Independent | Gurdial | 99 | 0.51% | New |
| Margin of victory | | 3,092 | 15.83% | ▲10.78 |
| Turnout | | 19,538 | 77.30% | ▲11.91 |
| Registered electors | | 25,598 | | ▲11.73 |
| INC gain from JP | | Swing | ▲0.33 | |

=== Assembly Election 1977 ===
1977 Himachal Pradesh Legislative Assembly election: Guler
| Party | Candidate | Votes | % | ±% |
|---|---|---|---|---|
| JP | Harbans Singh Rana | 6,649 | 45.06% | New |
| Independent | Chander Kumar | 5,905 | 40.01% | New |
| INC | Kuldip Singh | 1,718 | 11.64% | ▼7.79 |
| Independent | Mani Ram | 238 | 1.61% | New |
| Independent | Narinder Kumar | 168 | 1.14% | New |
| Independent | Rajender Singh | 79 | 0.54% | New |
| Margin of victory | | 744 | 5.04% | ▼26.59 |
| Turnout | | 14,757 | 65.60% | ▲4.52 |
| Registered electors | | 22,910 | | ▼17.29 |
| JP gain from Independent | | Swing | ▼6.01 | |

=== Assembly Election 1967 ===
1967 Himachal Pradesh Legislative Assembly election: Guler
| Party | Candidate | Votes | % | ±% |
|---|---|---|---|---|
| Independent | Churamani | 8,472 | 51.07% | New |
| INC | R. Lal | 3,224 | 19.43% | New |
| Independent | K. Vir | 2,920 | 17.60% | New |
| Independent | P. Chand | 1,024 | 6.17% | New |
| Independent | P. Ram | 538 | 3.24% | New |
| Independent | P. Chand | 411 | 2.48% | New |
| Margin of victory | | 5,248 | 31.64% | |
| Turnout | | 16,589 | 62.89% | |
| Registered electors | | 27,700 | | |
| Independent win (new seat) | | | | |

== See also ==
- Haripur Guler
- Kangra district
- Kangra (Lok Sabha constituency)
