= 2024 Indian general election in Himachal Pradesh =

Indian political election in Himachal Pradesh

- 1 June 2024

All 4 Himachal Pradesh seats in the Lok Sabha
- Turnout: 71.45% (▼0.97%)
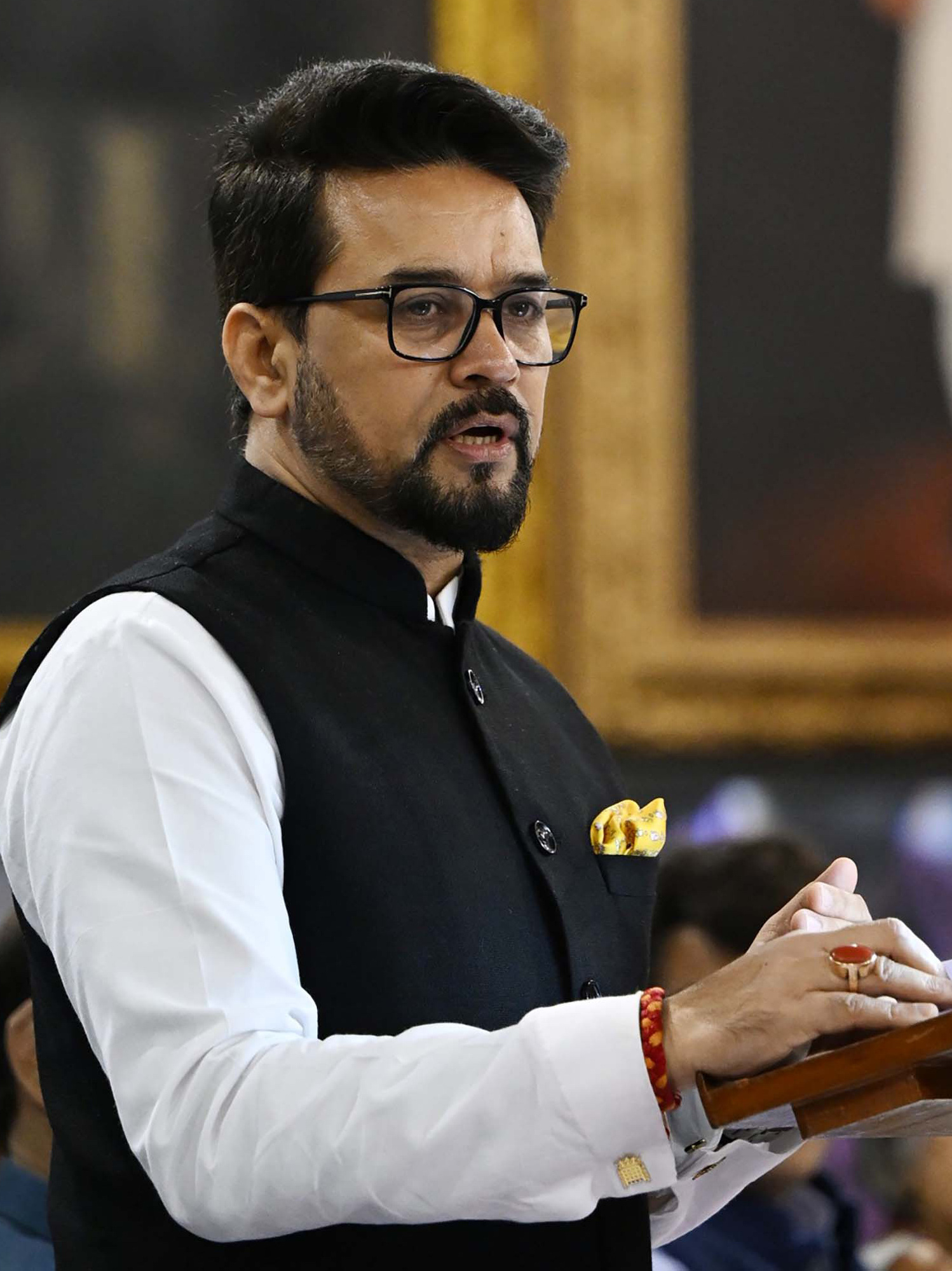
	First party
Leader	Anurag Thakur
Party	BJP
Alliance	NDA
Leader since	2021
Leader's seat	Hamirpur (won)
Last election	69.11%, 4 seats
Seats won	4
Seat change	Steady
Popular vote	22,56,936
Percentage	56.44%
Swing	▼12.67%
- Seatwise Result Map of the 2024 general election in Himachal Pradesh
Prime Minister before election
Narendra Modi
BJP
Prime Minister after election
Narendra Modi
BJP

The 2024 Indian general election was held on 1 June 2024 in Himachal Pradesh to elect 4 members of the 18th Lok Sabha, and the results were declared on 4 June 2024.

== Election schedule ==
Poll event	Phase
Poll event	VII
Notification date	7 May
Last date for filing nomination	14 May
Scrutiny of nomination	15 May
Last Date for withdrawal of nomination	17 May
Date of poll	1 June
Date of counting of votes/Result	4 June 2024
No. of constituencies	4

== Parties and alliances ==
=== National Democratic Alliance ===
National Democratic Alliance

Party	Flag	Symbol	Leader	Seats contested
Bharatiya Janata Party			Anurag Thakur	4

=== Indian National Developmental Inclusive Alliance ===
Indian National Developmental Inclusive Alliance

Party	Flag	Symbol	Leader	Seats contested
Indian National Congress			Vikramaditya Singh	4

== Candidates ==
Constituency					
Constituency		NDA		INDIA	
1	Kangra	BJP	Rajeev Bharadwaj	INC	Anand Sharma
2	Mandi	BJP	Kangana Ranaut	INC	Vikramaditya Singh
3	Hamirpur	BJP	Anurag Thakur	INC	Satpal Singh Raizada
4	Shimla (SC)	BJP	Suresh Kumar Kashyap	INC	Vinod Sultanpuri

== Survey and polls ==
=== Opinion polls ===
Polling agency	Date published	Margin of error				Lead
Polling agency	Date published	Margin of error	NDA	INDIA	Others	Lead
ABP News-CVoter	April 2024	±5%	4	0	0	NDA
ABP News-CVoter	March 2024	±5%	4	0	0	NDA
India Today-CVoter	February 2024	±3-5%	4	0	0	NDA
Times Now-ETG	December 2023	±3%	3-4	0-1	0	NDA
India TV-CNX	October 2023	±3%	3	1	0	NDA
Times Now-ETG	September 2023	±3%	3-4	0-1	0	NDA
Times Now-ETG	August 2023	±3%	3-4	0-1	0	NDA

Polling agency	Date published	Margin of error				Lead
Polling agency	Date published	Margin of error	NDA	INDIA	Others	Lead
ABP News-CVoter	April 2024	±5%	63%	33.2%	3.8%	29.8
ABP News-CVoter	March 2024	±5%	65%	32%	3%	33
India Today-CVoter	February 2024	±3-5%	60%	29%	11%	31

== Results ==
=== Results by alliance or party ===
Alliance/ Party		Popular vote			Seats		
Alliance/ Party		Votes	%	±pp	Contested	Won	+/−
NDA	BJP	2,256,936	56.44	▼12.67	4	4	Steady
INDIA	INC	1,666,322	41.67	▲14.37	4	0	Steady
Others		31,820	0.80			0	Steady
NOTA		22,822	0.57			0	Steady
Total		3,977,900	100%				4

=== Results by constituency ===
Constituency		Turnout	Winner				Runner-up				Margin
Constituency		Turnout	Candidate	Party	Votes	%	Candidate	Party	Votes	%	Margin
1	Kangra	68.15 ▼	Rajeev Bhardwaj	BJP	6,32,793	61.03	Anand Sharma	INC	3,80,898	36.74	2,51,895
2	Mandi	73.97 ▲	Kangana Ranaut	BJP	5,37,022	52.87	Vikramaditya Singh	INC	4,62,267	45.51	74,755
3	Hamirpur	72.28 ▼	Anurag Thakur	BJP	6,07,068	57.97	Satpal Singh Raizada	INC	4,24,711	40.55	1,82,357
4	Shimla (SC)	71.70 ▼	Suresh Kumar Kashyap	BJP	5,19,748	53.58	Vinod Sultanpuri	INC	4,28,297	44.16	91,451

== Assembly segments wise lead of Parties ==
2024 Himachal Pradesh Lok Sabha Elections Assembly Wise Leads Map

Party	Assembly segments	Position in Assembly (as of 2022 election)
Bharatiya Janata Party	61	25
Indian National Congress	7	40
Independent	0	3
Total	68	

== See also ==
- 2024 Indian general election in Jammu and Kashmir
- 2024 Indian general election in Jharkhand
- 2024 Indian general election in Karnataka
