= Arjun Singh (Himachal Pradesh politician) =

Indian politician

Member of the Himachal Pradesh Legislative Assembly
- In office 2017 – 8 December 2022
- Preceded by: Neeraj Bharti
- Succeeded by: Chander Kumar
- Constituency: Jawali

Personal details
- Born: 2 February 1963 (age 63) Chalwara, Kangra, Himachal Pradesh
- Party: Bhartiya Janta Party

Arjun Singh (born 2 February 1963) is an Indian politician, who served as Member of Legislative Assembly from Jawali constituency. Singh won first time from Jawali constituency in 2017 state assembly elections.

== Early life and education ==
Arjun Singh was born on 2 February 1963 in Chalwara village of Jawali tehsil in Kangra district, Himachal Pradesh to Rattan Chand and Leela Devi.

Arjun Singh graduated from Wazir Ram Singh College Dehri, Kangra. He went on to complete an M. A. (History) from Himachal Pradesh University and a B. Ed. from MET college of Education, Sopore (in Jammu and Kashmir).

== Politics ==
Singh's active state political journey started in 2012 and he associated with Himachal BJP organisation. He was a member of block development committee from 1990 to 1995. Then he was a Zila Parishad from 1996 to 1998. He was elected as President of BJP organisation in 2012 until 2018.

In 2017, he won from Jawali constituency as the Member of Legislative Assembly for Himachal Pradesh Legislative Assembly.
