= Sudhir Sharma =

Indian politician

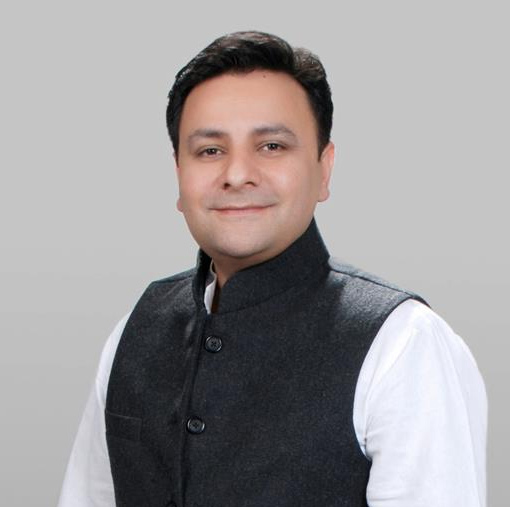

Member of the Himachal Pradesh Legislative Assembly
- Incumbent
- Assumed office 8 December 2022
- Preceded by: Vishal Nehria
- Constituency: Dharamshala
- In office 25 December 2012 – 18 December 2017
- Preceded by: Kishan Kapoor
- Succeeded by: Kishan Kapoor
- Constituency: Dharamshala
- In office 6 March 2003 – 25 December 2012
- Preceded by: Sant Ram
- Succeeded by: Kishori Lal
- Constituency: Baijnath

Personal details
- Born: 2 August 1972 (age 54)
- Party: Bharatiya Janata Party (2024–present)
- Other political affiliations: Indian National Congress (until 2024)
- Website: www.sudhirsharma.com

Sudhir Sharma (born 2 August 1972) is an Indian politician from the Bharatiya Janata Party and a former minister of housing, urban development and town & country planning in the Government of Himachal Pradesh. Sudhir Sharma was first elected to Himachal Pradesh State Assembly in 2003 from Baijnath Constituency. He won again from Baijnath in 2007. In 2012 he won from Dharmshala for third time.

== Political career ==
Sudhir Sharma's political journey has been marked by various responsibilities and achievements:

- Secretary, NSUI, Distt. Kangra, 1991
- General secretary:
  - Youth Congress, Distt. Kangra, 1994-1996
  - State Youth Congress, 1996-2003
- President, Kangra Yuva Kala Manch, 1997
- Member, Pradesh Congress Committee 2002
- General secretary, PCC
- Spokesman, PCC, 2009-2024
- Secretary, A.I.C.C., 2018-2024

He was elected to the State Legislative Assembly in 2003 and subsequently re-elected in 2007 from Baijnath and in 2012 from the Dharamshala Assembly Constituency. Sudhir Sharma served as the parliamentary secretary from 18 April 2005 to 18 August 2005. He was a member of various committees, including Public Accounts, Library & Member Amenities, and Rural Planning Committees from September 2005 to December 2007. Later, he held the position of urban development minister with portfolios of housing, town & country planning from 2012 to 2017.

In December 2022, Sudhir Sharma was elected to the State Legislative Assembly for the fourth term. He was nominated as the chairman of the Estimate Committee and is a member of the Privileges Committee. In 2024, he joined the BJP and was elected for a fifth term, on a BJP ticket.
