= Ravinder Singh Ravi =

Indian politician

Ravinder Singh Ravi is an Indian politician and member of the Bharatiya Janata Party. Ravi was a member of the Himachal Pradesh Legislative Assembly from the Thural constituency in Kangra district. He later contested and won elections from Dehra constituency in Himachal Pradesh in 2012.
