= Baijnath Assembly constituency =

Legislative Assembly constituency in Himachal Pradesh State, India

Coordinates: 32.05°N 76.65°E

Baijnath
- Constituency No. 20 for the Himachal Pradesh Legislative Assembly

Constituency details
- Country: India
- Region: North India
- State: Himachal Pradesh
- District: Kangra
- Lok Sabha constituency: Kangra
- Established: 1967
- Total electors: 91,352
- Reservation: SC

Member of Legislative Assembly
- 14th Himachal Pradesh Legislative Assembly
- Incumbent Kishori Lal
- Party: Indian National Congress
- Elected year: 2022

Baijnath is one of the 68 constituencies in the Himachal Pradesh Legislative Assembly. Himachal Pradesh, a northern state of India, is known for its beauty and serene and religious reputation. Baijnath, which is named after Jyotirlinga of Vaidyanath, is also part of the Kangra Lok Sabha constituency.

== Members of Legislative Assembly ==
Year	Member	Picture	Party
1967	Bansi Ram		Communist Party of India
1972	Sant Ram		Indian National Congress
1977	Sant Ram		Indian National Congress
1982	Sant Ram		Indian National Congress
1985	Sant Ram		Indian National Congress
1990	Dulo Ram		Bharatiya Janata Party
1993	Sant Ram		Indian National Congress
1998 (Note: By-election)	Dulo Ram		Bharatiya Janata Party
1998	Sant Ram		Indian National Congress
2003	Sudhir Sharma		Indian National Congress
2007	Sudhir Sharma		Indian National Congress
2012	Kishori Lal		Indian National Congress
2017	Mulkh Raj		Bharatiya Janata Party
2022	Kishori Lal		Indian National Congress

== Election results ==
=== Assembly Election 2022 ===
2022 Himachal Pradesh Legislative Assembly election: Baijnath
Party	Candidate	Votes	%	±%
INC	Kishori Lal	29,338	50.32%	▲14.25
BJP	Mulkh Raj Premi	25,892	44.41%	▼15.18
AAP	Parmodh Chand	1,109	1.90%	New
NOTA	Nota	669	1.15%	▲0.08
BSP	Ajay Kumar	536	0.92%	▼0.03
Independent	Gurdas Ram	531	0.91%	New
Swabhiman Party	Vishesh Verma	226	0.39%	New
Margin of victory		3,446	5.91%	▼17.61
Turnout		58,301	63.82%	▼3.38
Registered electors		91,352		▲13.96
INC gain from BJP		Swing	▼9.27	

=== Assembly Election 2017 ===
2017 Himachal Pradesh Legislative Assembly election: Baijnath
Party	Candidate	Votes	%	±%
BJP	Mulkh Raj	32,102	59.59%	▲27.66
INC	Kishori Lal	19,433	36.07%	▼9.81
NOTA	None of the Above	577	1.07%	New
BSP	Ramesh Chand	510	0.95%	▲0.19
Independent	Bir Singh	331	0.61%	New
Margin of victory		12,669	23.52%	▲9.57
Turnout		53,869	67.20%	▲3.90
Registered electors		80,160		▲6.42
BJP gain from INC		Swing	▲13.71	

=== Assembly Election 2012 ===
2012 Himachal Pradesh Legislative Assembly election: Baijnath
Party	Candidate	Votes	%	±%
INC	Kishori Lal	21,878	45.88%	▲1.49
BJP	Mulkh Raj	15,226	31.93%	▼5.21
HLC	Udho Ram	7,049	14.78%	New
Independent	Tilak Raj	1,862	3.91%	New
Himachal Swabhiman Party	Om Prakash	676	1.42%	New
BSP	Shashi Pal	359	0.75%	▼8.45
LJP	Ashok Kumar	295	0.62%	New
NCP	Vijay Kumar	274	0.57%	New
Margin of victory		6,652	13.95%	▲6.70
Turnout		47,681	63.30%	▼6.18
Registered electors		75,322		▲16.63
INC hold		Swing	▲1.49	

=== Assembly Election 2007 ===
2007 Himachal Pradesh Legislative Assembly election: Baijnath
Party	Candidate	Votes	%	±%
INC	Sudhir Sharma	19,921	44.40%	▼9.50
BJP	Dulo Ram	16,666	37.14%	▼1.72
BSP	Suresh Kumar	4,131	9.21%	▲7.48
Independent	Dhani Ram Thakur	2,870	6.40%	New
Independent	Akshay Jasrotia	612	1.36%	New
Independent	Vyas Dev Mehra	443	0.99%	New
Margin of victory		3,255	7.25%	▼7.78
Turnout		44,871	69.48%	▼2.55
Registered electors		64,582		▲12.08
INC hold		Swing	▼9.50	

=== Assembly Election 2003 ===
2003 Himachal Pradesh Legislative Assembly election: Baijnath
Party	Candidate	Votes	%	±%
INC	Sudhir Sharma	22,371	53.90%	▲14.99
BJP	Dulo Ram	16,132	38.87%	▼18.94
BSP	Kashmir Singh	715	1.72%	▲0.03
LJP	Baba Dhuni Nath Ji	557	1.34%	New
HVC	Rajesh Kumar	508	1.22%	New
LHMP	Meda Ram	421	1.01%	New
Independent	Milap Chand	421	1.01%	New
CPI	Jagdish Chand	221	0.53%	▼0.36
Margin of victory		6,239	15.03%	▼3.87
Turnout		41,507	72.09%	▲6.07
Registered electors		57,622		▲4.17
INC gain from BJP		Swing	▼3.91	

=== Assembly By-election 1998 ===
1998 Himachal Pradesh Legislative Assembly by-election: Baijnath
Party	Candidate	Votes	%	±%
BJP	Dulo Ram	21,092	57.80%	▲16.48
INC	Sudhir Sharma	14,195	38.90%	▼4.94
BSP	Udho Ram	619	1.70%	New
CPI	Jagdish Chand	327	0.90%	New
Margin of victory		6,897	18.90%	▲16.38
Turnout		36,489	66.37%	▼0.30
Registered electors		55,318		▲2.46
BJP gain from INC		Swing	▲13.96	

=== Assembly Election 1998 ===
1998 Himachal Pradesh Legislative Assembly election: Baijnath
Party	Candidate	Votes	%	±%
INC	Sant Ram	15,684	43.84%	▼11.30
BJP	Dulo Ram	14,782	41.32%	▲0.66
HVC	Kishori Lal	4,911	13.73%	New
Margin of victory		902	2.52%	▼11.96
Turnout		35,774	67.09%	▲6.50
Registered electors		53,992		▼2.64
INC hold		Swing		

=== Assembly Election 1993 ===
1993 Himachal Pradesh Legislative Assembly election: Baijnath
Party	Candidate	Votes	%	±%
INC	Sant Ram	18,276	55.14%	▲12.69
BJP	Dulo Ram	13,477	40.66%	▼14.60
JD	Anand Bhanwal	660	1.99%	New
BSP	Udho Ram	348	1.05%	▲0.52
Independent	Subhash Thakur	202	0.61%	New
Margin of victory		4,799	14.48%	▲1.67
Turnout		33,143	60.20%	▼6.58
Registered electors		55,458		▲24.19
INC gain from BJP		Swing	▼0.12	

=== Assembly Election 1990 ===
1990 Himachal Pradesh Legislative Assembly election: Baijnath
Party	Candidate	Votes	%	±%
BJP	Dulo Ram	16,371	55.26%	▲14.85
INC	Sant Ram	12,576	42.45%	▼16.34
Doordarshi Party	Diwan Chand	173	0.58%	New
BSP	Man Chand	158	0.53%	New
Margin of victory		3,795	12.81%	▼5.57
Turnout		29,625	66.85%	▲0.90
Registered electors		44,657		▲24.81
BJP gain from INC		Swing	▼3.53	

=== Assembly Election 1985 ===
1985 Himachal Pradesh Legislative Assembly election: Baijnath
Party	Candidate	Votes	%	±%
INC	Sant Ram	13,767	58.79%	▲12.88
BJP	Dulo Ram	9,462	40.41%	▲22.37
Independent	Kuldip Chand Katoch	187	0.80%	New
Margin of victory		4,305	18.38%	▼8.88
Turnout		23,416	66.31%	▼7.46
Registered electors		35,781		▲15.77
INC hold		Swing	▲12.88	

=== Assembly Election 1982 ===
1982 Himachal Pradesh Legislative Assembly election: Baijnath
Party	Candidate	Votes	%	±%
INC	Sant Ram	10,346	45.91%	▼7.65
Independent	Milkhi Ram	4,202	18.65%	New
BJP	D. D. Khanoria	4,065	18.04%	New
Independent	Gurmukh Singh	1,397	6.20%	New
CPI(M)	Vinod Kumar Purohit	1,223	5.43%	New
CPI	Tarlok Nath	879	3.90%	New
Independent	Narain Singh	204	0.91%	New
JP	Partap Singh	147	0.65%	▼41.13
Margin of victory		6,144	27.27%	▲15.48
Turnout		22,533	74.06%	▲15.18
Registered electors		30,908		▲3.89
INC hold		Swing	▼7.65	

=== Assembly Election 1977 ===
1977 Himachal Pradesh Legislative Assembly election: Baijnath
Party	Candidate	Votes	%	±%
INC	Sant Ram	9,200	53.57%	▼22.97
JP	Om Prakash Kauda	7,175	41.78%	New
Independent	Bhim Sain	455	2.65%	New
Independent	Ram Ruth	344	2.00%	New
Margin of victory		2,025	11.79%	▼49.00
Turnout		17,174	58.45%	▲14.54
Registered electors		29,752		▲15.87
INC hold		Swing	▼22.97	

=== Assembly Election 1972 ===
1972 Himachal Pradesh Legislative Assembly election: Baijnath
Party	Candidate	Votes	%	±%
INC	Sant Ram	8,487	76.54%	▲51.74
CPI	Bidhi Chand	1,747	15.76%	▼10.45
Independent	Mona	680	6.13%	New
Independent	Karm Chand	174	1.57%	New
Margin of victory		6,740	60.79%	▲59.38
Turnout		11,088	44.12%	▼3.44
Registered electors		25,678		▼8.14
INC gain from CPI		Swing	▲50.34	

=== Assembly Election 1967 ===
1967 Himachal Pradesh Legislative Assembly election: Baijnath
Party	Candidate	Votes	%	±%
CPI	Bansi Ram	3,415	26.20%	New
INC	K. Devi	3,232	24.80%	New
Independent	S. Ram	2,734	20.98%	New
Independent	B. Ram	1,294	9.93%	New
ABJS	A. Chand	1,233	9.46%	New
Independent	R. Parkash	648	4.97%	New
Independent	Bidhia	254	1.95%	New
Independent	Lala	222	1.70%	New
Margin of victory		183	1.40%	
Turnout		13,032	49.70%	
Registered electors		27,954		
CPI win (new seat)				

== See also ==
- Kangra district
- List of constituencies of Himachal Pradesh Legislative Assembly
