= Rajan Sushant =

Indian politician

Member of Parliament, Lok Sabha
- In office 2009-2014
- Preceded by: Chander Kumar
- Succeeded by: Shanta Kumar
- Constituency: Kangra, Himachal Pradesh

Personal details
- Born: 30 May 1955 (age 71) Sihal, Kangra district, Himachal Pradesh, India
- Party: Aam Aadmi Party (since 2022) and (2014-2016)
- Other political affiliations: Bharatiya Janata Party (till 2014); Himachal Regional Alliance (2016-2022)
- Spouse: Sudha Sushant (m. 1985)
- Children: 2

Rajan Sushant is an Indian politician and a member of Aam Aadmi Party. In the 2009 election he was elected to the Lok Sabha from the Kangra constituency in Himachal Pradesh on BJP ticket. He is a former member of Bhartiya Janata Party.

== Political career ==
He was suspended from Bharatiya Janata Party (BJP) in April 2011 on anti-party activities after he had raised serious corruption charges within the party. He left BJP few months before 2014.

=== Member of Legislative Assembly ===
Sushant emerged from the Emergency period churning after being in jail for months during his student days opposing emergency. He was elected as the youngest member of the H.P legislative assembly in 1982. He is a five-time member of the assembly and was Minister in BJP government from 1998 to 2003. He has led many agitations and movements, prominent being Shah Nahar, Daily Wagers and Nurpur College. He has been jailed by the various governments for years consequent to various public agitations and protests.

Many land reforms were also introduced during his tenure as Revenue Minister, major being translation of rules from Urdu to Hindi and English, issuing Kisan Pass Books and digitization of land records, etc.

=== Member of Parliament ===
In the 2009 election he was elected to the Lok Sabha from the Kangra constituency in Himachal Pradesh on BJP ticket.

=== Aam Aadmi Party ===
He had joined Anna Andolan and later joined AAP from where he contested the 2014 Lok Sabha election only to secure the third position in the Kangra-Chamba constituency. He then became active in a social organization.

In 2016 he quit AAP and founded a new party named Himachal Party Himachal Regional Alliance.

Since 2022, he is a member of Aam Aadmi Party. He is AAP candidate from Fatehpur, Himachal Pradesh Assembly constituency for the 2022 Himachal Pradesh Legislative Assembly election. His name was released in the first list of 4 candidates on 20 September 2022.

State Legislative Assembly
Preceded by Sujan Singh Pathania	Member of the Himachal Pradesh Legislative Assembly from Jawali Assembly constituency 1982 – 1990, 1998 – 2003, 2007 – 2009	Succeeded by Sujan Singh Pathania
Lok Sabha
Preceded by Chander Kumar	Member of Parliament for Kangra; 2009 – 2014	Succeeded by Shanta Kumar
