= 1995 elections in India =

Elections in India
← 1994	1995	1996 →

Elections in the Republic of India in 1995 included elections to six state legislative assemblies.

== Overall result ==
Date(s)	State	Government before	Chief Minister before	Government after	Elected Chief Minister	Maps
12 February and 9 March 1995	Maharashtra	Indian National Congress	Sharad Pawar	Shiv Sena	Manohar Joshi	
12 February and 9 March 1995	Maharashtra	Indian National Congress	Sharad Pawar	Bharatiya Janata Party	Manohar Joshi	
16 and 19 February 1995	Manipur	Indian National Congress	Rishang Keishing	Indian National Congress	Rishang Keishing	
9 March 1995	Odisha	Janata Dal	Biju Patnaik	Indian National Congress	Janaki Ballabh Pattanaik	
	Gujarat	Indian National Congress	Chhabildas Mehta	Bharatiya Janata Party	Keshubhai Patel	
25 and 28 March 1995	Bihar	Janata Dal	Lalu Prasad Yadav	Janata Dal	Lalu Prasad Yadav	
	Arunachal Pradesh	Indian National Congress	Gegong Apang	Indian National Congress	Gegong Apang	

== Legislative Assembly elections ==
=== Arunachal Pradesh ===
	CONTESTED	WON	FD	VOTES	%	SEATS
NATIONAL PARTIES						
1 . BJP	15	0	11	14335	3.37%	11.45%
2 . INC	60	43	0	214543	50.50%	50.50%
3 . JD	34	3	8	73248	17.24%	29.65%
4 . JP	5	2	1	10743	2.53%	28.49%
INDEPENDENTS						
5 . IND	59	12	19	111958	26.35%	39.11%
Grand Total :	173	60	39	424827		

=== Bihar ===
Party	Party Flag	Seats Contested	Seats Won	Seats Change	Efficiency	Vote Share
Janata Dal		264	167	(+) 45		28.0
Bharatiya Janata Party		315	41	(+) 2		13.0
Indian National Congress		320	29	(−) 42		16.3
Communist Party of India		61	26	(+) 3		4.8
Independent		5674	11	(−) 19		13.8
Jharkhand Mukti Morcha		63	10	(−) 8		2.3
Samata Party		310	7	(+) 7		7.1
Communist Party of India (Marxist–Leninist)		89	6	(+) 6		2.4
Communist Party of India (Marxist)		31	2	(−) 4		1.4
Jharkhand Mukti Morcha		22	6	(+) 6		
JMM (Marandi)		58	3	(+) 3		1.0
Samajwadi Party		176	2	(+) 2		1.7
Marxist Co-ordination Committee		5	2	(+) 0		0.3
Bahujan Samaj Party		161	2	(+) 2		1.3
Jharkhand People's Party		33	2	(+) 2		0.3
Champaran Vikas Party		15	1	(+) 1		0.3
Jharkhand Party		29	1	(+) 1		0.2
Bhartiya Pragatisheel Party		259	1	(+) 1		3.0

=== Gujarat ===
Parties and coalitions	Popular vote		Seats	
Parties and coalitions	Votes	%	Won	+/−
Bharatiya Janata Party (BJP)	7,672,401	42.51	121	+54
Indian National Congress (INC)	5,930,216	32.86	45	+12
Independents (IND)	3,376,637	18.71	16	
Janta Dal	508,561	2.82	0	
SP	14,513	0.08	0	0
CPM	30,563	0.17	0	
Bahujan Smajvadi Party	288,572	1.6	0	0
CPI	19,129	0.11	0	0
SAP	10,239	0.06	0	0
IUML	2,223	0.01	0	0
RSP	700	0.00	0	0
SHS	10,759	0.06	0	0
Total	18,048,194	100.00	182	±0
Valid votes	18,048,194	95.60		
Invalid votes	462,624	4.40		
Votes cast / turnout	18,686,757	64.39		
Registered voters	29,021,184			

=== Maharashtra ===
Political Party	Seats			Popular Vote		
Political Party	Contested	Won	+/-	Votes polled	Votes%	+/-
Indian National Congress 80 / 288 (28%)	286	80	▼61	1,19,41,832	31.00%	▼7.17%
Shiv Sena 73 / 288 (25%)	171	73	▲21	63,15,493	16.39%	▲0.45%
Bharatiya Janata Party 65 / 288 (23%)	117	65	▲23	49,32,767	12.80%	▲2.09%
Janata Dal 11 / 288 (4%)	182	11	▼13	22,58,914	5.86%	▼4.85%
Peasants and Workers Party of India 6 / 288 (2%)	42	6	▼2	7,88,286	2.05%	▼0.37%
Communist Party of India (Marxist) 3 / 288 (1%)	18	3	Steady	3,86,009	1.00%	▲0.13%
Samajwadi Party 3 / 288 (1%)	22	3	▲3	3,56,731	0.93%	▲0.93%
Nag Vidarbha Andolan Samiti 1 / 288 (0.3%)	2	1	▲1	82,677	0.21%	▲0.21%
Maharashtra Vikas Congress	3	1	▲1	45,404	0.12%	▲0.12%
Independents 45 / 288 (16%)	3196	45	▲32	91,04,036	23.63%	▲10.04%
Total	4727	288		3,8,526,206	100%	

=== Manipur ===
Party	Votes	%	Seats	+/–
Indian National Congress	328,362	28.08	22	–2
Manipur Peoples Party	271,247	23.20	18	+9
Janata Dal	136,594	11.68	7	–4
Samata Party	70,887	6.06	2	New
Communist Party of India	64,026	5.48	2	-1
Federal Party of Manipur	56,300	4.82	2	New
Indian Congress (Socialist)	44,797	3.83	1	New
Bharatiya Janata Party	38,405	3.28	1	+1
National People's Party (India)	30,417	2.60	2	+1
Samajwadi Janata Party (Rashtriya)	30,417	2.60	0	New
Kuki National Assembly	2,832	0.24	0	-2
Manipur Hill People's Council	2,440	0.21	0	0
Communist Party of India (Marxist)	2,327	0.20	0	New
Janata Party	1,611	0.14	0	New
Independents	88,526	7.57	3	+3
Total	1,169,188	100.00	60	+6
Valid votes	1,169,188	98.83		
Invalid/blank votes	13,868	1.17		
Total votes	1,183,056	100.00		
Registered voters/turnout	1,160,690	101.93		
Source: ECI

=== Odisha ===
Party	Votes	%	Seats	+/–
Indian National Congress	6,180,237	39.08	80	+70
Janata Dal	5,600,853	35.41	46	–77
Bharatiya Janata Party	1,245,996	7.88	9	+7
Jharkhand Mukti Morcha	307,517	1.94	4	New
Communist Party of India	271,199	1.71	1	–4
Jharkhand People's Party	27,494	0.17	1	New
Others	521,158	3.30	0	0
Independents	1,661,485	10.51	6	0
Total	15,815,939	100.00	147	0
Valid votes	15,815,939	97.30		
Invalid/blank votes	439,618	2.70		
Total votes	16,255,557	100.00		
Registered voters/turnout	22,075,775	73.64		
Source: ECI
