= Dulo Ram =

Indian politician

Dulo Ram is an Indian politician. He was member of the Bharatiya Janata Party. Ram was a member of the Himachal Pradesh Legislative Assembly from the Baijnath constituency in Kangra district. Later, he joined Himachal Lokhit Party ahead of 2012 Himachal Pradesh Legislative Assembly election.
