= Rajeev Bhardwaj =

Indian politician

Member of Parliament, Lok Sabha
- Incumbent
- Assumed office 4 June 2024
- Preceded by: Kishan Kapoor
- Constituency: Kangra

Personal details
- Born: 2 February 1963 (age 63)
- Party: Bharatiya Janata Party
- Other political affiliations: National Democratic Alliance
- Occupation: Doctor; Politician

Rajeev Bhardwaj is an Indian politician belonging to the Bharatiya Janata Party. He is the member of the 18th Lok Sabha.

== Early life ==
Rajeev Bhardwaj was originally a resident of the Mangwal in Kangra district’s Dehra tehsil. However, his family was evicted from the village following the construction of the Pong Dam in the 1970s. Bhardwaj continues to identify himself as a Pong Dam evictee as many families are yet to receive their promised compensation and subsequent land allocation.

== Political career ==
Bhardwaj currently serves as the Member of Lok Sabha from the Kangra constituency. He was elected in the 2024 Indian general elections with a margin of 251,895 votes defeating his nearest rival candidate Anand Sharma.
