= Shanta Kumar =

Indian politician (born 1934)

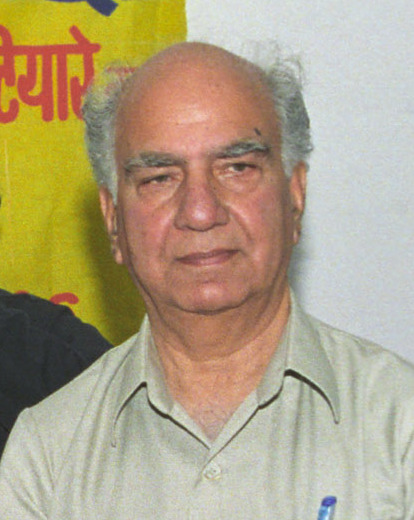
- Kumar in 2006

3rd Chief Minister of Himachal Pradesh
- In office 5 March 1990 – 15 December 1992
- Governor: Virendra Verma
- Preceded by: Virbhadra Singh
- Succeeded by: Virbhadra Singh
- In office 22 June 1977 – 14 February 1980
- Governor: Amin ud-din Ahmad Khan
- Preceded by: President's Rule
- Succeeded by: Thakur Ram Lal

Member of Parliament for Kangra
- In office 16 May 2014 – 23 May 2019
- Preceded by: Rajan Sushant
- Succeeded by: Kishan Kapoor

Minister of Consumer Affairs, Food and Public Distribution
- In office 13 October 1999 – 30 June 2002
- Prime Minister: Atal Bihari Vajpayee
- Succeeded by: Sharad Yadav
- Constituency: Kangra

Minister of Rural Development
- In office 1 July 2002 – 6 April 2003
- Prime Minister: Atal Bihari Vajpayee
- Preceded by: Venkaiah Naidu
- Succeeded by: Kashiram Rana

Personal details
- Born: 12 September 1934 (age 92) Kangra, Punjab, British India (now in Himachal Pradesh, India)
- Party: Bharatiya Janata Party (1980–present)
- Other political affiliations: Janata Party (1977–1980); Bharatiya Jana Sangh (until 1977)
- Spouse: Santosh Shailja

Shanta Kumar Sharma (born 12 September 1934) is an Indian politician who was the 3rd Chief Minister of Himachal Pradesh and a Union Minister in the Government of India. He is a member of the Bharatiya Janata Party. He was elected to the 9th Lok Sabha from Kangra constituency in 1989. He was re-elected to the Lok Sabha in 1998, 1999 and 2014 from the same constituency. He has written a number of books. He is the first and only person not of a Rajput background who has served as the Chief Minister of Himachal Pradesh.

== Early life ==
Shanta Kumar Sharma was born to Jagannath Sharma and Kaushalya Devi on 12 September 1934 in Garhjamula, Kangra district, Punjab Province.

== Political career ==
His political career began in 1963 when he was elected as a Panch in the Gram panchayat for Garhjamula. He was subsequently elected as a member of the Panchayat Samiti in Bhawarna and then was president of Zilla Parishad in Kangra from 1965 to 1970.

He was elected to the Himachal Pradesh Legislative Assembly in 1972. He remained a member till 1985. He was re-elected to the House again in 1990 and continued till 1992. He became the Chief Minister of Himachal Pradesh in 1977. He held the post till 1980 and came back to head the Government again in 1990 and stayed till 1992. He had enforced "No Work, No Pay" policy during his second term as Chief Minister for strongly dealing with the striking government employees. He was the Leader of Opposition in the Himachal Pradesh Legislative Assembly from 1980 to 1985.

He was elected to the 9th Lok Sabha in 1989 from Kangra. He was re-elected twice in 1998 and 1999. He was a senior minister in the Atal Bihari Vajpayee government from 1999 to 2004. He was Union Minister of Consumer Affairs and Public Distribution from 1999 to 2002 and Union Minister of Rural Development from 2002 to 2004.

He was elected to the Rajya Sabha from Himachal Pradesh in 2008. In 2014, he was elected to the 16th Lok Sabha from Kangra. In 2014-15 he chaired a committee on the restructuring of the Food Corporation of India (FCI). He was potential candidate for governorship, but not yet appointed since 2014.

He has been known for appreciating Aam Aadmi Party's work on Government Schools' transformation in Delhi and his expression of sympathy towards Manish Sisodia and other AAP leaders in 2024, terming them as "not personally corrupt".

== Personal background ==
He was married to Santosh Shailja in 1964. He has three daughters Indu Sharma, Renu Mujumdar, Shalini Sathyan and a son Vikram Sharma. His wife died in December 2020 due to coronavirus at Dr Rajendra Prasad Government Medical College, Tanda. She worked as teacher in initial years but later quit her job and switched over to writing and social work among women and underprivileged sections and also wrote some books.

== Election results ==
General Election, 2014: Kangra
Party	Candidate	Votes	%	±%
BJP	Shanta Kumar	4,56,163	57.05	+8.37
INC	Chander Kumar	2,86,091	35.79	−9.76
AAP	Dr. Rajan Sushant	24,430	3.06	+3.06
NOTA	None of the Above	8,704	1.09	+1.09
Majority		1,70,072	21.27	+18.13
Turnout		7,99,445	64.46	+9.31
BJP hold		Swing	+8.37	

== Writing ==
Kumar's books include:

- Dharti Balidan Ki, 1962
- Himalaya Par Lal Chhaya, 1964
- Vishwa Vijeta Vivekanand, 1968
- Lajo, 1976
- Man Ke Meet, 1976
- Kaidi, 1976
- Jyotirmayi, 1977
- O Pravasi Meet Mere, 1977
- Mrigtrishna, 1980
- Kranti Abhi Adhoori Hai, 1985
- Deewar Ke Us Paar, 1995
- Rajneeti Ki Shatranj, 1997
- Tumhare Pyar Ki Pati, 1999
- Vrinda, 2007
- A Patriot monk Swami Vivekananda, 2012
