= Hem Raj =

Indian politician

Hem Raj (13 November 1904 in Dera Gopipur, Kangra district – ?) was member of the 1st Lok Sabha from Kangra (Lok Sabha constituency) in Punjab, India.

He was elected to the 2nd, 3rd and 4th Lok Sabha from Kangra later as from Himachal Pradesh State.
