= Gian Chand =

Pakistani politician

Senator Gianchand

Member of the Senate of Pakistan
- Incumbent
- Assumed office March 2015

Personal details
- Party: Pakistan Peoples Party

Gayan Chand is a Pakistani politician who has been a member of Senate of Pakistan since March 2015.

== Education ==
He holds a degree of Bachelor of Engineering which he received from Sindh Agriculture University in 1989. He was the second Dalit to be elected on general seat as senator.

== Political career ==
He was elected to the Senate of Pakistan as a candidate of Pakistan Peoples Party in the 2015 Pakistani Senate election.
