= Vishal Nehria =

Indian politician

Member of the Himachal Pradesh Legislative Assembly
- In office 2019–2022
- Constituency: Dharamshala

Personal details
- Born: 20 July 1988 (age 37) Himachal Pradesh, India
- Party: Bharatiya Janata Party

Vishal Nehria (born 20 July 1988) is an Indian politician. He was elected to the Himachal Pradesh Legislative Assembly from Dharamshala constituency in the 2019 by election as a member of the BJP as the then-incumbent member of the constituency, Kishan Kapoor, got elected to the Parliament of India.

Vishal Nehria was married to Oshin Sharma a HAS Officer of Himachal Cadre. Later they divorced and on February 1, 2025 Vishal married another.

== Political career ==
Nehria was part of Akhil Bharatiya Vidyarthi Parishad, the student wing of BJP, and Rashtriya Swayamsevak Sangh, a Hindu-nationalist organization that is affiliated with BJP. Nehria joined BJP in 2014 and also held positions in state's Bharatiya Janata Party Yuva Morcha from time to time thereafter. He got elected to the State Legislative Assembly for the first time in by-election on 24 October 2019.

In May 2022 he announced that Indian cricket team coach Rahul Dravid would attend a party event conducted by BJP. Rahul Dravid denied any such plans to attend.
