= Thural =

Town in Himachal Pradesh, India

Thural is a town and a sub-tehsil located in the Kangra district of the Indian state of Himachal Pradesh. Situated in the foothills of the Dhauladhar range, the town serves as a key administrative and commercial center for the surrounding rural areas of the Jaisinghpur constituency.

== Geography ==
Thural is situated at an elevation of approximately 1,200 metres above sea level. It is located near the banks of the Neugal Khad, a prominent tributary of the Beas River. The geography is characterized by the rugged terrain of the lower Himalayas, with the local economy traditionally supported by the fertile lands of the Kangra Valley.

== Folklore: Gwal Tilla ==
A prominent geographic landmark near the town is Gwal Tilla (lit. "Shepherd’s Mound"). According to local oral tradition and Pahadi folklore, the site is associated with a tragic legend involving a young shepherd and a passing wedding procession. The shepherd is said to have called out to a bride in verse ("Aar jarari, paar jarari… laal ghunde waali meri laadi!") before leaping from the mound into the gorge. The legend states the bride followed him into the abyss. A stone memorial (samadhi) at the site is recognized in local cultural studies as a place of traditional remembrance where travelers leave stones as a mark of respect.

== Administration and infrastructure ==
Administratively, Thural is classified as a sub-tehsil. The town hosts several public institutions, including a Government Degree College and a Community Health Centre (CHC). It is connected via the state highway network to the nearby towns of Palampur and Jaisinghpur.
