= Kishori Lal (Baijnath politician) =

Indian politician

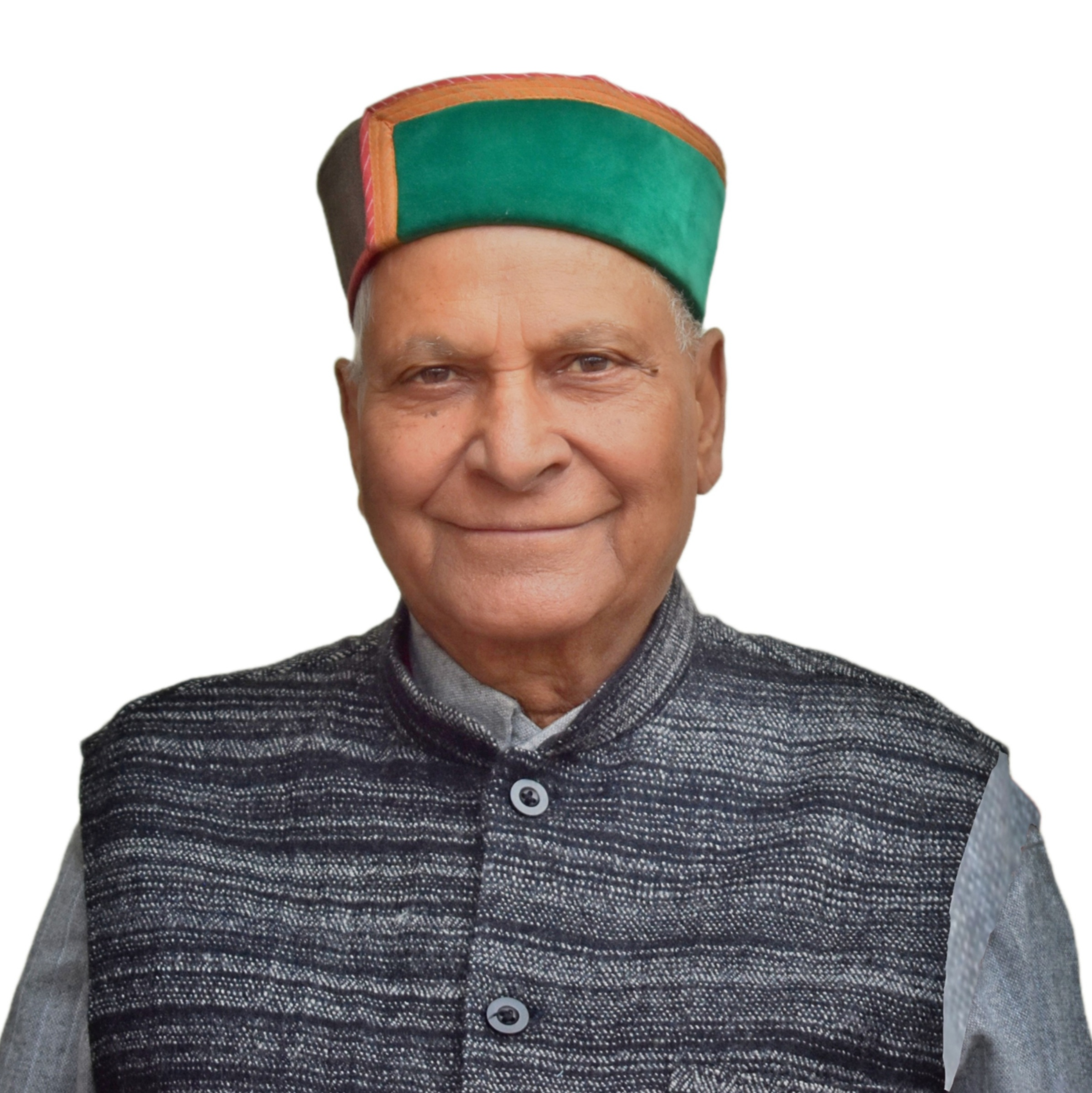
- Kishori Lal

Chief Parliamentary Secretary, Government of Himachal Pradesh
- Incumbent
- Assumed office 8 January 2023
- Governor: Rajendra Arlekar (2022–2023); Shiv Pratap Shukla (2023–2026); Kavinder Gupta (2026–present)
- Chief Minister: Sukhvinder Singh Sukhu
- Deputy CM: Mukesh Agnihotri
- Departments: Agriculture For Animal Husbandry; Rural Development; Panchayati Raj.

Member of the Himachal Pradesh Legislative Assembly
- Incumbent
- Assumed office 8 December 2022
- Preceded by: Mulkh Raj
- Constituency: Baijnath
- In office 25 December 2012 – 18 December 2017
- Preceded by: Sudhir Sharma
- Succeeded by: Mulkh Raj
- Constituency: Baijnath

Personal details
- Born: 10 October 1947 (age 78) Baijnath, Himachal Pradesh
- Party: Indian National Congress
- Spouse: Jogindera Devi
- Children: 1 son and 3 daughters
- Occupation: Businessman, Agriculturist

Kishori Lal (born at Baijnath, Kangra district, Himachal Pradesh) is an Indian politician who is Chief Parliamentary Secretary in Himachal Pradesh Government and Member of the Legislative Assembly (MLA) for the Baijnath constituency in Himachal Pradesh. He was elected as a member of the Indian National Congress in 2012. In 2022 he was again elected as MLA for the second time and appointed Chief Parliamentary Secretary in Himachal Pradesh Government.

== Early life and education ==
Kishori Lal, born on 10 October 1947 in Baijnath, District Kangra, is known for his contributions as an agriculturist, hotelier, and public servant.

Kishori Lal is a matriculate and is married to Smt. Jogendra Devi. The couple has one son and three daughters.

== Political career ==
Kishori Lal has held various positions in the political landscape:

- Panchayat Up-Pradhan
- Panchayat Pradhan (served five times)
- General Secretary:
  - Block Congress Committee
  - District Congress Committee
  - Pradesh Congress Committee
- Senior Vice-President, District Congress Committee
- Member, Pradesh Congress Committee (PCC)

He was elected to the State Legislative Assembly in December 2012. During his tenure, he served on multiple committees, including the Welfare Committee (2013-2014), Human Development Committee (2013-2015), Public Undertakings & General Development Committees (2013-2017), and Subordinate Legislation Committee (2016-2017).

Kishori Lal was re-elected to the State Legislative Assembly in December 2022 and was appointed Chief Parliamentary Secretary. He is attached to the Agriculture Minister for the Animal Husbandry Department. He is also connected to the Rural Development & Panchayati Raj Minister for the Rural Development Department & Panchayati Raj Department, effective from 8 January 2023.

== Special interest ==
Kishori Lal has a special interest in social work.

== See also ==
- Twelfth Legislative Assembly of Himachal Pradesh
