= Jawali Assembly constituency =

Legislative Assembly constituency in Himachal Pradesh State, India

Coordinates: 32.15°N 76.01°E

Jawali
- Constituency No. 9 for the Himachal Pradesh Legislative Assembly

Constituency details
- Country: India
- Region: North India
- State: Himachal Pradesh
- District: Kangra
- Lok Sabha constituency: Kangra
- Established: 1967
- Total electors: 99,572
- Reservation: None

Member of Legislative Assembly
- 14th Himachal Pradesh Legislative Assembly
- Incumbent Chander Kumar
- Party: Indian National Congress
- Elected year: 2022

Jawali Assembly constituency is one of the 68 constituencies in the Himachal Pradesh Legislative Assembly of Himachal Pradesh a northern state of India. Jawali is also part of Kangra Lok Sabha constituency.

== Members of Legislative Assembly ==
| Year | Member | Party |
|---|---|---|
| 1967 | R. Chandra | Indian National Congress |
| 1972 | Vikram Singh | Indian National Congress |
| 1977 | Sujan Singh Pathania | Janata Party |
| 1982 | Rajan Sushant | Bharatiya Janata Party |
| 1985 | Rajan Sushant | Bharatiya Janata Party |
| 1990 | Sujan Singh Pathania | Indian National Congress |
| 1993 | Sujan Singh Pathania | Indian National Congress |
| 1998 | Rajan Sushant | Bharatiya Janata Party |
| 2003 | Sujan Singh Pathania | Indian National Congress |
| 2007 | Rajan Sushant | Bharatiya Janata Party |
| 2009 (Note: by-election) | Sujan Singh Pathania | Indian National Congress |
| 2012 | Neeraj Bharti | Indian National Congress |
| 2017 | Arjun Singh | Bharatiya Janata Party |
| 2022 | Chander Kumar | Indian National Congress |

== Election results ==
=== Assembly Election 2022 ===
2022 Himachal Pradesh Legislative Assembly election: Jawali
| Party | Candidate | Votes | % | ±% |
|---|---|---|---|---|
| INC | Chander Kumar | 38,243 | 51.22% | ▲9.25 |
| BJP | Sanjay Guleria | 35,212 | 47.16% | ▼6.78 |
| NOTA | Nota | 373 | 0.50% | ▼0.26 |
| Himachal Jan Kranti Party | Arun Kumar | 306 | 0.41% | New |
| AAP | Baldev Raj | 277 | 0.37% | New |
| BSP | Bir Singh | 258 | 0.35% | New |
| Margin of victory | | 3,031 | 4.06% | ▼7.91 |
| Turnout | | 74,669 | 73.32% | ▼2.65 |
| Registered electors | | 1,01,845 | | ▲12.78 |
| INC gain from BJP | | Swing | ▼2.72 | |

=== Assembly Election 2017 ===
2017 Himachal Pradesh Legislative Assembly election: Jawali
| Party | Candidate | Votes | % | ±% |
|---|---|---|---|---|
| BJP | Arjun Singh | 36,999 | 53.93% | ▲20.22 |
| INC | Chander Kumar | 28,786 | 41.96% | ▲0.53 |
| NOTA | None of the Above | 518 | 0.76% | New |
| Margin of victory | | 8,213 | 11.97% | ▲4.25 |
| Turnout | | 68,600 | 75.96% | ▲4.94 |
| Registered electors | | 90,307 | | ▲11.66 |
| BJP gain from INC | | Swing | | |

=== Assembly Election 2012 ===
2012 Himachal Pradesh Legislative Assembly election: Jawali
| Party | Candidate | Votes | % | ±% |
|---|---|---|---|---|
| INC | Neeraj Bharti | 23,798 | 41.43% | ▼9.29 |
| BJP | Arjun Singh | 19,364 | 33.71% | ▼6.43 |
| Independent | Sanjay Kumar Guleria | 10,924 | 19.02% | New |
| Independent | Sushil Sharma | 1,221 | 2.13% | New |
| HLC | Ravinder Singh | 693 | 1.21% | New |
| BSP | Ravi Kumar | 493 | 0.86% | New |
| NCP | Aman Kumar | 315 | 0.55% | New |
| Margin of victory | | 4,434 | 7.72% | ▼2.86 |
| Turnout | | 57,443 | 71.03% | ▲5.34 |
| Registered electors | | 80,874 | | ▲7.06 |
| INC hold | | Swing | ▼9.29 | |

=== Assembly By-election 2009 ===
2009 Himachal Pradesh Legislative Assembly by-election: Jawali
| Party | Candidate | Votes | % | ±% |
|---|---|---|---|---|
| INC | Sujan Singh Pathania | 25,168 | 50.72% | ▲12.01 |
| BJP | Baldev Raj | 19,919 | 40.14% | ▼7.87 |
| Independent | Madan Sharma | 3,580 | 7.21% | New |
| Independent | Ashok Kumar Somal | 952 | 1.92% | New |
| Margin of victory | | 5,249 | 10.58% | ▲1.27 |
| Turnout | | 49,619 | 65.68% | ▼6.85 |
| Registered electors | | 75,541 | | ▼1.57 |
| INC gain from BJP | | Swing | ▲2.71 | |

=== Assembly Election 2007 ===
2007 Himachal Pradesh Legislative Assembly election: Jawali
| Party | Candidate | Votes | % | ±% |
|---|---|---|---|---|
| BJP | Dr. Rajan Sushant | 26,729 | 48.02% | ▲7.17 |
| INC | Sujan Singh Pathania | 21,548 | 38.71% | ▼13.31 |
| BSP | Vicky (Rajan Mankotia) | 3,229 | 5.80% | ▲5.02 |
| Independent | Dilaber Singh Chhotu | 2,665 | 4.79% | New |
| Independent | Ashok Kumar Somal | 1,433 | 2.57% | New |
| Margin of victory | | 5,181 | 9.31% | ▼1.87 |
| Turnout | | 55,667 | 72.53% | ▼4.85 |
| Registered electors | | 76,749 | | ▲13.80 |
| BJP gain from INC | | Swing | ▼4.00 | |

=== Assembly Election 2003 ===
2003 Himachal Pradesh Legislative Assembly election: Jawali
| Party | Candidate | Votes | % | ±% |
|---|---|---|---|---|
| INC | Sujan Singh Pathania | 27,147 | 52.02% | ▲11.22 |
| BJP | Dr. Rajan Sushant | 21,314 | 40.84% | ▼16.81 |
| HVC | Krishan Kumar | 2,452 | 4.70% | ▲4.06 |
| LJP | Rajesh Kumar | 526 | 1.01% | New |
| BSP | Rattan Chand | 409 | 0.78% | New |
| SP | Vinod Kumar | 337 | 0.65% | ▼0.05 |
| Margin of victory | | 5,833 | 11.18% | ▼5.67 |
| Turnout | | 52,185 | 77.47% | ▲3.21 |
| Registered electors | | 67,440 | | ▲19.96 |
| INC gain from BJP | | Swing | ▼5.63 | |

=== Assembly Election 1998 ===
1998 Himachal Pradesh Legislative Assembly election: Jawali
| Party | Candidate | Votes | % | ±% |
|---|---|---|---|---|
| BJP | Dr. Rajan Sushant | 24,041 | 57.65% | ▲12.33 |
| INC | Sujan Singh Pathania | 17,014 | 40.80% | ▼8.69 |
| SP | Ramesh Chand | 292 | 0.70% | New |
| HVC | Surjeet Kumar | 266 | 0.64% | New |
| Margin of victory | | 7,027 | 16.85% | ▲12.68 |
| Turnout | | 41,699 | 74.84% | ▼1.15 |
| Registered electors | | 56,220 | | ▲7.99 |
| BJP gain from INC | | Swing | ▲8.16 | |

=== Assembly Election 1993 ===
1993 Himachal Pradesh Legislative Assembly election: Jawali
| Party | Candidate | Votes | % | ±% |
|---|---|---|---|---|
| INC | Sujan Singh Pathania | 19,409 | 49.49% | ▼1.07 |
| BJP | Dr. Rajan Sushant | 17,773 | 45.32% | ▼0.78 |
| Independent | Fouza Singh Sombal | 994 | 2.53% | New |
| BSP | Nanak Chand | 474 | 1.21% | ▲0.70 |
| Independent | Govind Singh Gulfria | 434 | 1.11% | New |
| Margin of victory | | 1,636 | 4.17% | ▼0.29 |
| Turnout | | 39,216 | 75.88% | ▼1.96 |
| Registered electors | | 52,062 | | ▲4.29 |
| INC hold | | Swing | ▼1.07 | |

=== Assembly Election 1990 ===
1990 Himachal Pradesh Legislative Assembly election: Jawali
| Party | Candidate | Votes | % | ±% |
|---|---|---|---|---|
| INC | Sujan Singh Pathania | 19,508 | 50.57% | ▲2.07 |
| BJP | Dr. Rajan Sushant | 17,787 | 46.10% | ▼3.65 |
| CPI | Balbir Singh | 675 | 1.75% | New |
| Doordarshi Party | Milap Chand | 295 | 0.76% | New |
| BSP | Mast Ram | 196 | 0.51% | New |
| Margin of victory | | 1,721 | 4.46% | ▲3.20 |
| Turnout | | 38,580 | 77.92% | ▼1.45 |
| Registered electors | | 49,919 | | ▲39.28 |
| INC gain from BJP | | Swing | ▲0.81 | |

=== Assembly Election 1985 ===
1985 Himachal Pradesh Legislative Assembly election: Jawali
| Party | Candidate | Votes | % | ±% |
|---|---|---|---|---|
| BJP | Dr. Rajan Sushant | 14,040 | 49.76% | ▲2.50 |
| INC | Sujan Singh Pathania | 13,684 | 48.49% | ▲3.38 |
| Independent | Mast Ram | 494 | 1.75% | New |
| Margin of victory | | 356 | 1.26% | ▼0.88 |
| Turnout | | 28,218 | 79.48% | ▲2.17 |
| Registered electors | | 35,841 | | ▲11.12 |
| BJP hold | | Swing | ▲2.50 | |

=== Assembly Election 1982 ===
1982 Himachal Pradesh Legislative Assembly election: Jawali
| Party | Candidate | Votes | % | ±% |
|---|---|---|---|---|
| BJP | Dr. Rajan Sushant | 11,669 | 47.26% | New |
| INC | Sujan Singh Pathania | 11,141 | 45.12% | ▲20.39 |
| Independent | Shiv Raj | 620 | 2.51% | New |
| Independent | Badhawa Sijngh | 379 | 1.53% | New |
| Independent | Jaswant Singh | 314 | 1.27% | New |
| Independent | Krishan Chander Dhiman | 276 | 1.12% | New |
| LKD | Fakar Deen | 149 | 0.60% | New |
| Independent | Tilak Raj | 145 | 0.59% | New |
| Margin of victory | | 528 | 2.14% | ▼21.69 |
| Turnout | | 24,693 | 77.94% | ▲7.34 |
| Registered electors | | 32,253 | | ▲8.78 |
| BJP gain from JP | | Swing | ▼1.30 | |

=== Assembly Election 1977 ===
1977 Himachal Pradesh Legislative Assembly election: Jawali
| Party | Candidate | Votes | % | ±% |
|---|---|---|---|---|
| JP | Sujan Singh Pathania | 9,965 | 48.56% | New |
| INC | Vikram Singh | 5,075 | 24.73% | ▼55.85 |
| Independent | Shiv Raj Kaundal | 3,548 | 17.29% | New |
| Independent | Prakash Chand Sharma | 1,107 | 5.39% | New |
| Independent | Gagan Singh | 329 | 1.60% | New |
| Independent | Babu Ram | 228 | 1.11% | New |
| Independent | Shankar Singh | 189 | 0.92% | New |
| Margin of victory | | 4,890 | 23.83% | ▼42.73 |
| Turnout | | 20,522 | 70.58% | ▲13.08 |
| Registered electors | | 29,649 | | ▲20.43 |
| JP gain from INC | | Swing | ▼32.02 | |

=== Assembly Election 1972 ===
1972 Himachal Pradesh Legislative Assembly election: Jawali
| Party | Candidate | Votes | % | ±% |
|---|---|---|---|---|
| INC | Vikram Singh | 11,136 | 80.58% | ▲32.09 |
| Independent | Punjab Singh | 1,937 | 14.02% | New |
| Independent | Randhir Singh | 469 | 3.39% | New |
| Independent | Zulfi Ram | 278 | 2.01% | New |
| Margin of victory | | 9,199 | 66.56% | ▲57.93 |
| Turnout | | 13,820 | 57.50% | ▼9.92 |
| Registered electors | | 24,619 | | ▼4.19 |
| INC hold | | Swing | ▲32.09 | |

=== Assembly Election 1967 ===
1967 Himachal Pradesh Legislative Assembly election: Jawali
| Party | Candidate | Votes | % | ±% |
|---|---|---|---|---|
| INC | R. Chandra | 8,229 | 48.49% | New |
| Independent | V. Singh | 6,764 | 39.85% | New |
| CPI(M) | R. Chand | 795 | 4.68% | New |
| Independent | Mast Ram | 705 | 4.15% | New |
| Independent | T. Singh | 479 | 2.82% | New |
| Margin of victory | | 1,465 | 8.63% | |
| Turnout | | 16,972 | 70.20% | |
| Registered electors | | 25,695 | | |
| INC win (new seat) | | | | |

== See also ==
- Jawali, Himachal Pradesh
- Kangra district
- List of constituencies of Himachal Pradesh Legislative Assembly
