= Bansi Ram =

Indian politician

Bansi Ram was an Indian politician and a leader of Communist Party of India from Himachal Pradesh. He represented the Baijnath constituency from 1967 to 1972.
