= Sujan Singh Pathania =

Indian politician (1943–2021)

Sujan Singh Pathania (1943 – 2021) was an Indian politician. He served as minister and sitting legislator, from Jawali and Fatehpur Assembly constituency.

== Electoral performance ==
2017 Himachal Pradesh Legislative Assembly election: Fatehpur
Party	Candidate	Votes	%	±%
INC	Sujan Singh Pathania	18,962	31.92%	▼4.66
BJP	Kripal Singh Parmar	17,678	29.76%	▲7.33
Independent	Baldev Thakur	13,090	22.04%	New
Independent	Dr. Rajan Sushant	6,205	10.45%	New
BSP	Om Parkash	830	1.40%	▼8.37
Independent	Bidhi Chand Sharma	580	0.98%	New
Lok Gathbandhan Party	Rasal Singh	392	0.66%	New
Independent	Dr. Ashok Kumar Somal	375	0.63%	New
NOTA	None of the Above	329	0.55%	New
Margin of victory		1,284	2.16%	▼11.98
Turnout		59,401	73.52%	▲3.32
Registered electors		80,793		▲11.17
INC hold		Swing	▼4.66	

2007 Himachal Pradesh Legislative Assembly election: Jawali
Party	Candidate	Votes	%	±%
BJP	Dr. Rajan Sushant	26,729	48.02%	▲7.17
INC	Sujan Singh Pathania	21,548	38.71%	▼13.31
BSP	Vicky (Rajan Mankotia)	3,229	5.80%	▲5.02
Independent	Dilaber Singh Chhotu	2,665	4.79%	New
Independent	Ashok Kumar Somal	1,433	2.57%	New
Margin of victory		5,181	9.31%	▼1.87
Turnout		55,667	72.53%	▼4.85
Registered electors		76,749		▲13.80
BJP gain from INC		Swing	▼4.00	

2003 Himachal Pradesh Legislative Assembly election: Jawali
Party	Candidate	Votes	%	±%
INC	Sujan Singh Pathania	27,147	52.02%	▲11.22
BJP	Dr. Rajan Sushant	21,314	40.84%	▼16.81
HVC	Krishan Kumar	2,452	4.70%	▲4.06
LJP	Rajesh Kumar	526	1.01%	New
BSP	Rattan Chand	409	0.78%	New
SP	Vinod Kumar	337	0.65%	▼0.05
Margin of victory		5,833	11.18%	▼5.67
Turnout		52,185	77.47%	▲3.21
Registered electors		67,440		▲19.96
INC gain from BJP		Swing	▼5.63	

1998 Himachal Pradesh Legislative Assembly election: Jawali
Party	Candidate	Votes	%	±%
BJP	Dr. Rajan Sushant	24,041	57.65%	▲12.33
INC	Sujan Singh Pathania	17,014	40.80%	▼8.69
SP	Ramesh Chand	292	0.70%	New
HVC	Surjeet Kumar	266	0.64%	New
Margin of victory		7,027	16.85%	▲12.68
Turnout		41,699	74.84%	▼1.15
Registered electors		56,220		▲7.99
BJP gain from INC		Swing	▲8.16	

1993 Himachal Pradesh Legislative Assembly election: Jawali
Party	Candidate	Votes	%	±%
INC	Sujan Singh Pathania	19,409	49.49%	▼1.07
BJP	Dr. Rajan Sushant	17,773	45.32%	▼0.78
Independent	Fouza Singh Sombal	994	2.53%	New
BSP	Nanak Chand	474	1.21%	▲0.70
Independent	Govind Singh Gulfria	434	1.11%	New
Margin of victory		1,636	4.17%	▼0.29
Turnout		39,216	75.88%	▼1.96
Registered electors		52,062		▲4.29
INC hold		Swing	▼1.07	

1990 Himachal Pradesh Legislative Assembly election: Jawali
Party	Candidate	Votes	%	±%
INC	Sujan Singh Pathania	19,508	50.57%	▲2.07
BJP	Dr. Rajan Sushant	17,787	46.10%	▼3.65
CPI	Balbir Singh	675	1.75%	New
Doordarshi Party	Milap Chand	295	0.76%	New
BSP	Mast Ram	196	0.51%	New
Margin of victory		1,721	4.46%	▲3.20
Turnout		38,580	77.92%	▼1.45
Registered electors		49,919		▲39.28
INC gain from BJP		Swing	▲0.81	

1985 Himachal Pradesh Legislative Assembly election: Jawali
Party	Candidate	Votes	%	±%
BJP	Dr. Rajan Sushant	14,040	49.76%	▲2.50
INC	Sujan Singh Pathania	13,684	48.49%	▲3.38
Independent	Mast Ram	494	1.75%	New
Margin of victory		356	1.26%	▼0.88
Turnout		28,218	79.48%	▲2.17
Registered electors		35,841		▲11.12
BJP hold		Swing	▲2.50	

1982 Himachal Pradesh Legislative Assembly election: Jawali
Party	Candidate	Votes	%	±%
BJP	Dr. Rajan Sushant	11,669	47.26%	New
INC	Sujan Singh Pathania	11,141	45.12%	▲20.39
Independent	Shiv Raj	620	2.51%	New
Independent	Badhawa Sijngh	379	1.53%	New
Independent	Jaswant Singh	314	1.27%	New
Independent	Krishan Chander Dhiman	276	1.12%	New
LKD	Fakar Deen	149	0.60%	New
Independent	Tilak Raj	145	0.59%	New
Margin of victory		528	2.14%	▼21.69
Turnout		24,693	77.94%	▲7.34
Registered electors		32,253		▲8.78
BJP gain from JP		Swing	▼1.30	
