= Dharamshala Assembly constituency =

Legislative Assembly constituency in Himachal Pradesh State, India

Coordinates: 32.22°N 76.32°E

Dharamshala
- Constituency No. 18 for the Himachal Pradesh Legislative Assembly

Constituency details
- Country: India
- Region: North India
- State: Himachal Pradesh
- District: Kangra
- Lok Sabha constituency: Kangra
- Established: 1967
- Total electors: 83,829
- Reservation: None

Member of Legislative Assembly
- 14th Himachal Pradesh Legislative Assembly
- Incumbent Sudhir Sharma
- Party: BJP
- Elected year: ^2024

Dharamshala Assembly constituency is one of the 68 constituencies in the Himachal Pradesh Legislative Assembly of Himachal Pradesh a northern state of India. Dharamshala is also part of Kangra Lok Sabha constituency.

== Members of Legislative Assembly ==
Year	Member	Picture	Party
1967	R. K. Chand		Indian National Congress
1972	Chander Verker		Indian National Congress
1977	Brij Lal		Janata Party
1982	Brij Lal		Bharatiya Janata Party
1985	Mool Raj Padhal		Indian National Congress
1990	Kishan Kapoor		Bharatiya Janata Party
1993	Kishan Kapoor		Bharatiya Janata Party
1998	Kishan Kapoor		Bharatiya Janata Party
2003	Chandresh Kumari		Indian National Congress
2007	Kishan Kapoor		Bharatiya Janata Party
2012	Sudhir Sharma		Indian National Congress
2017	Kishan Kapoor		Bharatiya Janata Party
2019 (Note: By-election)	Vishal Nehria		Bharatiya Janata Party
2022	Sudhir Sharma		Indian National Congress
^2024	Sudhir Sharma		Bharatiya Janata Party

== Election results ==
=== Assembly By-election 2024 ===
2024 Himachal Pradesh Legislative Assembly by-election: Dharamshala
Party	Candidate	Votes	%	±%
BJP	Sudhir Sharma	28,066	45.06	▲5.00
INC	Devinder Singh (Jaggi)	22,540	36.19	▼9.34
Independent	Rakesh Chaudhary	10,770	17.29	New
NOTA	Nota	429	0.82	▲0.09
Margin of victory		5,526	8.90	▲7.68
Turnout		62,280	64.23%	▼13.21
Registered electors		82,137		▲3.43
BJP gain from INC		Swing		

=== Assembly Election 2022 ===
2022 Himachal Pradesh Legislative Assembly election: Dharamshala
Party	Candidate	Votes	%	±%
INC	Sudhir Sharma	27,323	45.53%	▲29.88
BJP	Rakesh Choudhary	24,038	40.06%	▼4.71
Independent	Vipan Nehria	7,416	12.36%	New
AAP	Kulwant Singh Rana	527	0.88%	New
NOTA	Nota	438	0.73%	▼0.09
Independent	Subhash Chand Shukla	170	0.28%	New
Independent	Dr. Abhay Kumar Ashok	98	0.16%	New
Margin of victory		3,285	5.47%	▼7.40
Turnout		60,010	71.59%	▲7.69
Registered electors		83,829		▲2.06
INC gain from BJP		Swing	▲0.76	

=== Assembly By-election 2019 ===
2019 Himachal Pradesh Legislative Assembly by-election: Dharamshala
Party	Candidate	Votes	%	±%
BJP	Vishal Nehria	23,498	44.77%	▼0.36
Independent	Rakesh Kumar	16,740	31.89%	New
INC	Vijay Inder Karan	8,212	15.65%	▼24.29
Independent	Puneesh Sharma	2,345	4.47%	New
Independent	Dr. Manohar Lal Dhiman	887	1.69%	New
Independent	Nisha Katoch	435	0.83%	New
NOTA	Nota	429	0.82%	New
Independent	Subhash Chand Shukla	368	0.70%	New
Margin of victory		6,758	12.88%	▲7.68
Turnout		52,485	64.23%	▼13.21
Registered electors		82,137		▲9.72
BJP hold		Swing	▼0.36	

=== Assembly Election 2017 ===
2017 Himachal Pradesh Legislative Assembly election: Dharamshala
Party	Candidate	Votes	%	±%
BJP	Kishan Kapoor	26,050	45.13%	▲11.11
INC	Sudhir Sharma	23,053	39.94%	▼4.56
Independent	Ravinder Rana	2,127	3.68%	New
Independent	Pankaj Kumar (Panku)	1,726	2.99%	New
Independent	Kamal Kumar	1,655	2.87%	New
NOTA	None of the Above	525	0.91%	New
BSP	Pawan Choudhary	471	0.82%	▼0.14
BMP	Ashwani Kajal	307	0.53%	New
Margin of victory		2,997	5.19%	▼5.28
Turnout		57,725	77.11%	▲3.21
Registered electors		74,863		▲15.89
BJP gain from INC		Swing	▲0.63	

=== Assembly Election 2012 ===
2012 Himachal Pradesh Legislative Assembly election: Dharamshala
Party	Candidate	Votes	%	±%
INC	Sudhir Sharma	21,241	44.49%	▲16.87
BJP	Kishan Kapoor	16,241	34.02%	▼10.11
Independent	Kamla Patiyal	3,580	7.50%	New
Independent	Amar Dass (Nikku Purohit)	2,269	4.75%	New
Independent	Ashwani Kajal Chaudhary	1,452	3.04%	New
Independent	Subhash Chand Shukla	649	1.36%	New
BSP	Sudershan Angaria	458	0.96%	▼23.60
CPI(M)	Jagdish Chand	402	0.84%	▼1.53
AITC	Chinta Har	334	0.70%	New
NCP	Gulshan Kumar	271	0.57%	New
LJP	Suraksha Devi	263	0.55%	New
Margin of victory		5,000	10.47%	▼6.03
Turnout		47,739	73.90%	▲2.06
Registered electors		64,598		▲0.59
INC gain from BJP		Swing	▲0.36	

=== Assembly Election 2007 ===
2007 Himachal Pradesh Legislative Assembly election: Dharamshala
Party	Candidate	Votes	%	±%
BJP	Kishan Kapoor	20,362	44.13%	▲4.10
INC	Chandresh Kumari Katoch	12,746	27.63%	▼24.41
BSP	Major Vijay Singh Mankotia	11,331	24.56%	New
CPI(M)	Kapoor Singh Sapahya	1,096	2.38%	New
Adarsh Political Party	Bimal	571	1.24%	New
Margin of victory		7,616	16.51%	▲4.50
Turnout		46,138	71.84%	▼3.65
Registered electors		64,219		▲13.74
BJP gain from INC		Swing	▼7.91	

=== Assembly Election 2003 ===
2003 Himachal Pradesh Legislative Assembly election: Dharamshala
Party	Candidate	Votes	%	±%
INC	Chandresh Kumari Katoch	22,181	52.04%	▲13.04
BJP	Kishan Kapoor	17,063	40.03%	▼8.91
HVC	Ram Swaroop	2,473	5.80%	▲3.86
Independent	Uttam Kapoor	423	0.99%	New
SP	Jaswant Singh	246	0.58%	New
LJP	Sudesh Kumar	237	0.56%	New
Margin of victory		5,118	12.01%	▲2.07
Turnout		42,623	75.53%	▲6.38
Registered electors		56,459		▲15.58
INC gain from BJP		Swing	▲3.10	

=== Assembly Election 1998 ===
1998 Himachal Pradesh Legislative Assembly election: Dharamshala
Party	Candidate	Votes	%	±%
BJP	Kishan Kapoor	16,522	48.94%	▲11.46
INC	Ram Swaroop	13,167	39.00%	▲2.83
CPI(M)	Kapoor Singh Sapahya	1,550	4.59%	New
BSP	Amin Chand Chaudhary	846	2.51%	▼2.03
HVC	Rakesh Narayan	657	1.95%	New
Independent	Nanak Barsain (Jubilee)	566	1.68%	New
JD	Bidhi Chand Choudhary	316	0.94%	▼1.29
Margin of victory		3,355	9.94%	▲8.63
Turnout		33,760	69.99%	▼4.05
Registered electors		48,849		▲12.10
BJP hold		Swing	▲11.46	

=== Assembly Election 1993 ===
1993 Himachal Pradesh Legislative Assembly election: Dharamshala
Party	Candidate	Votes	%	±%
BJP	Kishan Kapoor	11,950	37.48%	▼31.97
INC	Chandresh Kumari Katoch	11,533	36.18%	▲17.56
Independent	Mool Raj Padha	4,457	13.98%	New
Independent	Arun Kumar	1,569	4.92%	New
BSP	Amin Chand	1,447	4.54%	▲2.46
JD	Ranjit Singh	711	2.23%	New
Margin of victory		417	1.31%	▼49.53
Turnout		31,881	73.73%	▲8.65
Registered electors		43,576		▲4.60
BJP hold		Swing	▼31.97	

=== Assembly Election 1990 ===
1990 Himachal Pradesh Legislative Assembly election: Dharamshala
Party	Candidate	Votes	%	±%
BJP	Kishan Kapoor	18,666	69.45%	▲25.48
INC	Mool Raj Padha	5,003	18.62%	▼30.33
Independent	Kamlesh Kumar	1,264	4.70%	New
CPI(M)	Kapoor Singh Saphaya	971	3.61%	New
BSP	Bashir	558	2.08%	New
Margin of victory		13,663	50.84%	▲45.87
Turnout		26,876	64.99%	▼7.28
Registered electors		41,660		▲37.28
BJP gain from INC		Swing	▲20.51	

=== Assembly Election 1985 ===
1985 Himachal Pradesh Legislative Assembly election: Dharamshala
Party	Candidate	Votes	%	±%
INC	Mool Raj Padha	10,663	48.94%	▲15.02
BJP	Kishan Kapoor	9,580	43.97%	▼2.32
Independent	Dil Vikram Singh	914	4.20%	New
CPI	Rakesh Narayan	567	2.60%	▼1.45
Margin of victory		1,083	4.97%	▼7.40
Turnout		21,787	72.74%	▼2.99
Registered electors		30,347		▲10.45
INC gain from BJP		Swing	▲2.65	

=== Assembly Election 1982 ===
1982 Himachal Pradesh Legislative Assembly election: Dharamshala
Party	Candidate	Votes	%	±%
BJP	Brij Lal	9,513	46.29%	New
INC	Mool Raj Sharma	6,971	33.92%	▼4.40
Independent	Chander Verkar	2,511	12.22%	New
CPI	Sita Ram	832	4.05%	New
JP	Sital Ram	250	1.22%	▼56.97
LKD	Shiv Shankar	151	0.73%	New
Independent	Swami Shanta Nand	105	0.51%	New
Independent	Onkar Singh Kaistha	102	0.50%	New
Margin of victory		2,542	12.37%	▼7.49
Turnout		20,549	76.33%	▲15.64
Registered electors		27,477		▲10.26
BJP gain from JP		Swing	▼11.89	

=== Assembly Election 1977 ===
1977 Himachal Pradesh Legislative Assembly election: Dharamshala
Party	Candidate	Votes	%	±%
JP	Brij Lal	8,576	58.18%	New
INC	Chander Verkar	5,649	38.32%	▲8.67
Independent	Sital Ram	346	2.35%	New
Independent	Madan Lal	117	0.79%	New
Margin of victory		2,927	19.86%	▲18.00
Turnout		14,740	59.94%	▲10.33
Registered electors		24,920		▲18.97
JP gain from INC		Swing	▲28.53	

=== Assembly Election 1972 ===
1972 Himachal Pradesh Legislative Assembly election: Dharamshala
Party	Candidate	Votes	%	±%
INC	Chander Verkar	3,032	29.65%	▼7.69
Independent	Brij Lal	2,842	27.79%	New
Independent	Bhagat Ram	1,539	15.05%	New
Independent	Sital Ram	949	9.28%	New
ABJS	Onkar Singh	856	8.37%	▼27.35
Independent	Roshan Lal	502	4.91%	New
Independent	Bipan Chand	358	3.50%	New
Independent	Karm Chand	147	1.44%	New
Margin of victory		190	1.86%	▲0.24
Turnout		10,225	49.97%	▲2.03
Registered electors		20,946		▼15.89
INC hold		Swing	▼7.69	

=== Assembly Election 1967 ===
1967 Himachal Pradesh Legislative Assembly election: Dharamshala
Party	Candidate	Votes	%	±%
INC	R. K. Chand	4,351	37.34%	New
ABJS	N. Singh	4,162	35.72%	New
Independent	P. Nabh	1,129	9.69%	New
Independent	J. Karan	1,077	9.24%	New
Independent	B. Dass	639	5.48%	New
Independent	K. Singh	293	2.51%	New
Margin of victory		189	1.62%	
Turnout		11,651	50.67%	
Registered electors		24,904		
INC win (new seat)				

== See also ==
- Dharamshala
- Kangra district
- List of constituencies of Himachal Pradesh Legislative Assembly
