= Bhawani Singh Pathania =

Indian politician (born 1974)

Member of the Himachal Pradesh Legislative Assembly
- Incumbent
- Assumed office 2 November 2021
- Preceded by: Sujan Singh Pathania
- Constituency: Fatehpur

Personal details
- Born: 20 August 1974 (age 51) Dharamshala, Himachal Pradesh
- Party: Indian National Congress
- Parent: Sujan Singh Pathania (father)

Bhawani Singh Pathania (born 20 August 1974) is an Indian politician and a Member of Legislative Assembly (MLA) representing Fatehpur in the Himachal Pradesh Legislative Assembly in India. He won over Indian National Congress ticket and Symbol.
