= Fatehpur, Himachal Pradesh Assembly constituency =

Legislative Assembly constituency in Himachal Pradesh State, India

Coordinates: 32.2°N 76.36°E

Fatehpur
- Constituency No. 8 for the Himachal Pradesh Legislative Assembly

Constituency details
- Country: India
- Region: North India
- State: Himachal Pradesh
- District: Kangra
- Lok Sabha constituency: Kangra
- Established: 2007
- Total electors: 87,913
- Reservation: None

Member of Legislative Assembly
- 14th Himachal Pradesh Legislative Assembly
- Incumbent Bhawani Singh Pathania
- Party: Indian National Congress
- Elected year: 2022

Fatehpur is one of the 68 constituencies in the Himachal Pradesh Legislative Assembly. It is a part of Kangra Lok Sabha constituency.

== Members of Legislative Assembly ==
Election	Member	Party
2012	Sujan Singh Pathania	Indian National Congress
2017	Sujan Singh Pathania	Indian National Congress
2021 (Note: By-Election)	Bhawani Singh Pathania	Indian National Congress
2022	Bhawani Singh Pathania	Indian National Congress

== Election results ==
=== Assembly By-election 2021 ===
A by-election was needed for this constituency due to the death of the sitting MLA, Sujan Singh Pathania, on 13 February 2021.

2021 Himachal Pradesh Legislative Assembly by-election: Fatehpur
Party	Candidate	Votes	%	±%
INC	Bhawani Singh Pathania	24,449	42.82%	▲10.90
BJP	Baldev Thakur	18,660	32.68%	▲2.92
Independent	Dr. Rajan Sushant	12,927	22.64%	New
NOTA	Nota	389	0.68%	New
Himachal Jan Kranti Party	Pankaj Kumar Darshi	375	0.66%	New
Independent	Dr. Ashok Kumar Somal	295	0.52%	New
Margin of victory		5,789	10.14%	▲7.98
Turnout		57,095	64.91%	▼8.06
Registered electors		87,222		▲7.96
INC hold		Swing	▲10.90	

=== Assembly Election 2017 ===
2017 Himachal Pradesh Legislative Assembly election: Fatehpur
Party	Candidate	Votes	%	±%
INC	Sujan Singh Pathania	18,962	31.92%	▼4.66
BJP	Kripal Singh Parmar	17,678	29.76%	▲7.33
Independent	Baldev Thakur	13,090	22.04%	New
Independent	Dr. Rajan Sushant	6,205	10.45%	New
BSP	Om Parkash	830	1.40%	▼8.37
Independent	Bidhi Chand Sharma	580	0.98%	New
Lok Gathbandhan Party	Rasal Singh	392	0.66%	New
Independent	Dr. Ashok Kumar Somal	375	0.63%	New
NOTA	None of the Above	329	0.55%	New
Margin of victory		1,284	2.16%	▼11.98
Turnout		59,401	73.52%	▲3.32
Registered electors		80,793		▲11.17
INC hold		Swing	▼4.66	

== See also ==
- Kangra district
- List of constituencies of Himachal Pradesh Legislative Assembly
