= Kangra Lok Sabha constituency =

Lok Sabha constituency in Himachal Pradesh

Coordinates: 32.1°N 76.3°E

Kangra HP-1
- Lok Sabha constituency
- Interactive Map Outlining Kangra Lok Sabha constituency

Constituency details
- Country: India
- Region: North India
- State: Himachal Pradesh
- Assembly constituencies: 17: Churah, Chamba, Dalhousie, Bhattiyat, Nurpur, Indora, Fatehpur, Jawali, Jawalamukhi, Jaisinghpur, Sullah, Nagrota, Kangra, Shahpur, Dharamshala, Palampur and Baijnath
- Established: 1952
- Reservation: None

Member of Parliament
- 18th Lok Sabha
- Incumbent Rajeev Bhardwaj
- Party: BJP
- Alliance: NDA
- Elected year: 2024

Kangra Lok Sabha constituency is one of the four Lok Sabha (parliamentary) constituencies in Himachal Pradesh state in northern India.

== Assembly segments ==
Kangra Lok Sabha constituency presently comprised the following 17 Vidhan Sabha (legislative assembly) segments:

No	Name	District	Member	Party	2024 Lead
1	Churah (SC)	Chamba	Hans Raj	BJP	BJP
3	Chamba	Chamba	Niraj Nayyar	INC	BJP
4	Dalhousie	Chamba	Dhavinder Singh	BJP	BJP
5	Bhattiyat	Chamba	Kuldeep Singh Pathania	INC	BJP
6	Nurpur	Kangra	Ranbir Singh	BJP	BJP
7	Indora (SC)	Kangra	Malender Rajan	INC	BJP
8	Fatehpur	Kangra	Bhawani Singh Pathania	INC	BJP
9	Jawali	Kangra	Chander Kumar	INC	BJP
12	Jawalamukhi	Kangra	Sanjay Rattan	INC	BJP
13	Jaisinghpur (SC)	Kangra	Yadvinder Goma	INC	BJP
14	Sullah	Kangra	Vipin Singh Parmar	BJP	BJP
15	Nagrota	Kangra	Raghubir Singh Bali	INC	BJP
16	Kangra	Kangra	Pawan Kumar Kajal	BJP	BJP
17	Shahpur	Kangra	Kewal Singh Pathania	INC	BJP
18	Dharamshala	Kangra	Sudhir Sharma	BJP	BJP
19	Palampur	Kangra	Ashish Butail	INC	BJP
20	Baijnath (SC)	Kangra	Kishori Lal	INC	BJP

== Members of Parliament ==
Year	Name	Party
1952	Hem Raj	Indian National Congress
1957	Hem Raj	Indian National Congress
1957	Daljit Singh	Indian National Congress
1962	Hem Raj	Indian National Congress
1967	Hem Raj	Indian National Congress
1971	Vikram Chand Mahajan	Indian National Congress
1977	Kanwar Durga Chand	Janata Party
1980	Vikram Chand Mahajan	Indian National Congress
1984	Chandresh Kumari Katoch	Indian National Congress
1989	Shanta Kumar	Bharatiya Janata Party
1991	D. D. Khanoria	Bharatiya Janata Party
1996	Sat Mahajan	Indian National Congress
1998	Shanta Kumar	Bharatiya Janata Party
1999	Shanta Kumar	Bharatiya Janata Party
2004	Chander Kumar	Indian National Congress
2009	Rajan Sushant	Bharatiya Janata Party
2014	Shanta Kumar	Bharatiya Janata Party
2019	Kishan Kapoor	Bharatiya Janata Party
2024	Rajeev Bhardwaj	Bharatiya Janata Party

== Election results ==
=== 2024 ===
2024 Indian general elections: Kangra
Party	Candidate	Votes	%	±%
BJP	Rajeev Bhardwaj	632,793	61.03	▼10.09
INC	Anand Sharma	3,80,898	36.74	▲12.15
BSP	Rekha Chaudhary	7,753	0.75	▼0.13
IND	Adv Sanjay Sharma	2,319	0.22	New
IND	Dr Kehkar Singh	2,178	0.21	New
NOTA	None of the Above	6,372	0.61	▼0.51
Majority		2,51,895	24.29	▼23.14
Turnout		10,38,678	68.15	
BJP hold		Swing	▼10.99	

=== 2019 ===
2019 Indian general elections: Kangra
Party	Candidate	Votes	%	±%
BJP	Kishan Kapoor	725,218	72.02	▲14.96
INC	Pawan Kajal	2,47,595	24.59	▼11.20
BSP	Dr. Kehar Singh	8,866	0.88	▲0.14
IND	Dr. Sanjiv Guleria	4,573	0.45	New
IND	Prem Chand Vishwakarma	2,371	0.24	New
NOTA	None of the Above	11,327	1.12	▲0.03
Majority		4,77,623	47.43	▲26.16
Turnout		10,06,989	70.55	▲7.03
BJP hold		Swing	▲14.96	

=== 2014 ===
2014 Indian general elections: Kangra
Party	Candidate	Votes	%	±%
BJP	Shanta Kumar	456,163	57.06	▲8.37
INC	Chander Kumar	2,86,091	35.79	▼9.76
AAP	Dr. Rajan Sushant	24,430	3.06	New
BSP	Lal Hussain	5,949	0.74	▼1.19
IND.	Bhupinder Mehra	5,585	0.70	▲0.70
NOTA	None of the Above	8,704	1.09	▲1.09
Majority		1,70,072	21.27	▲18.13
Turnout		7,99,445	63.52	▲8.37
BJP hold		Swing	▲8.37	

=== 2009 ===
2009 Indian general elections: Kangra
Party	Candidate	Votes	%	±%
BJP	Dr. Rajan Sushant	322,254	48.69	
INC	Chander Kumar	3,01,475	45.55	
BSP	Col. Narinder Singh Pathania	12,745	1.93	
IND.	Roshan Lal	8,283	1.25	
LJP	Keshab	7,720	1.17	
Majority		20,779	3.14	
Turnout		6,61,847	55.15	
BJP gain from INC		Swing		

=== 2004 ===
Party	Candidate Name	Votes	Votes %
INC	Chander Kumar	314,555	49.1%
BJP	Shanta Kumar	296,764	46.3%
BSP	Lt. Col. Shakti Chand Chaudhary (Retd.)	10,860	1.7%
IND	Fakir Chand	10,594	1.7%
SP	Roshan Rana	7,092	1.1%
IND	Dhani Ram	3,312	0.5%
Majority		17,791	2.8%
Turnout		6,40,345	62.0%

=== General elections 1999 ===
1999 Indian general elections: Kangra
Party	Candidate	Votes	%	±%
BJP	Shanta Kumar	325,066	58.80%	
INC	Sat Mahajan	2,24,324	40.58%	
Majority		1,00,742		
Turnout		5,52,860	59.57%	
BJP hold		Swing		

=== General elections 1998 ===
1998 Indian general election: Kangra
Party	Candidate	Votes	%	±%
BJP	Shanta Kumar	334,684	52.65%	
INC	Sat Mahajan	2,75,449	43.33%	
Majority		59,235		
Turnout		6,35,730	71.71%	
BJP gain from INC		Swing		

=== General elections 1996 ===
1996 Indian general election: Kangra
Party	Candidate	Votes	%	±%
INC	Sat Mahajan	263,817	49.64%	
BJP	Shanta Kumar	2,26,293	42.58%	
Majority		37,524		
Turnout		5,31,429	61.23%	
INC gain from BJP		Swing		

=== General elections 1991 ===
1991 Indian general election: Kangra
Party	Candidate	Votes	%	±%
BJP	D. D. Khanoria	174,457	41.01%	
INC	Chandresh Kumari	1,63,641	38.46%	
JD	Suresh Chaudhary	75,905	17.84%	
Majority		10,816		
Turnout		4,25,434	55.83%	
BJP hold		Swing		

=== General elections 1989 ===
1989 Indian general election: Kangra
Party	Candidate	Votes	%	±%
BJP	Shanta Kumar	235,147	46.33%	
INC	Chandresh Kumari	1,75,943	34.66%	
JD	Vijai Singh Mankotia	74,983	14.77%	
Majority		59,204		
Turnout		5,07,577	69.58%	
BJP gain from INC		Swing		

=== General elections 1984 ===
1984 Indian general election: Kangra
Party	Candidate	Votes	%	±%
INC	Chandresh Kumari	232,287	62.45%	
BJP	Sarvan Kumar	1,14,854	30.88%	
Majority		37,524		
Turnout		3,71,954	67.09%	
INC gain from INC		Swing		

=== General elections 1980 ===
1980 Indian general election: Kangra
Party	Candidate	Votes	%	±%
INC	Vikram Chand Mahajan	148,946	45.25%	
JP	Sarvan Kumar Chaudhari	1,14,854	30.88%	
JP(S)	Kanwar Durga Chand	25,727	7.82%	
Majority		30,930		
Turnout		3,29,129	63.99%	
INC gain from JP		Swing		

=== General elections 1977 ===
1977 Indian general election: Kangra
Party	Candidate	Votes	%	±%
JP	Kanwar Durga Chand	157,832	53.17%	
INC(R)	Vikram Chand Mahajan	1,18,828	40.03%	
CPI	Bansi Ram	15,709	5.29%	
Majority		39,004		
Turnout		2,96,836	63.96%	
JP gain from INC(R)		Swing		

=== General elections 1971 ===
1971 Indian general election: Kangra
Party	Candidate	Votes	%	±%
INC(R)	Vikram Chand Mahajan	111,276	65.97%	
ABJS	Sarvan Kumar Chaudhari	40,388	23.94%	
CPI	Paras Ram	11,249	6.67%	
Majority		30,930		
Turnout		1,68,680	42.57%	
INC(R) hold		Swing		

=== General elections 1967 ===
1967 Indian general election: Kangra
Party	Candidate	Votes	%	±%
INC	Hem Raj	44,262	33.03%	
ABJS	Sarvan Kumar Chaudhari	38,860	29.00%	
Independent	M. Ram	21,073	15.73%	
Majority		5,402		
Turnout		1,34,001	54.22%	
INC hold		Swing		

== See also ==
- Kangra district
- List of constituencies of the Lok Sabha
