= Kishan Kapoor =

Indian politician (1951–2025)

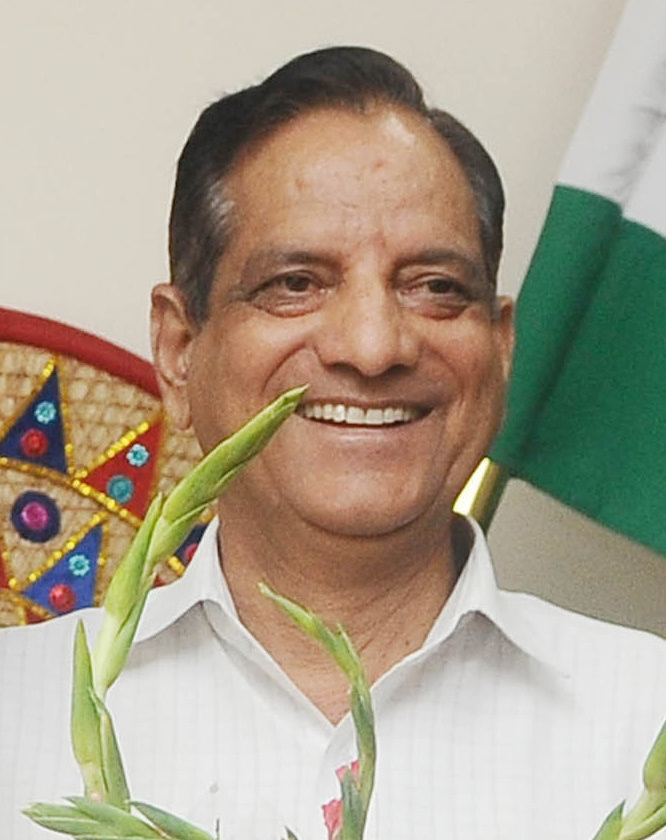
- Kapoor in 2018

Member of Parliament, Lok Sabha
- In office 23 May 2019 – 4 June 2024
- Preceded by: Shanta Kumar
- Succeeded by: Rajeev Bhardwaj
- Constituency: Kangra

Food and Civil Supplies, Consumer Affairs and Election Minister Himachal Pradesh Government
- In office 27 December 2017 – 23 May 2019
- Chief Minister: Jai Ram Thakur
- Preceded by: GS Bali
- Succeeded by: Rajinder Garg
- Constituency: Dharamshala assembly constituency

Industries, Transport and Urban Development Minister Himachal Pradesh Government
- In office 2007–2012
- Chief Minister: Prem Kumar Dhumal
- Constituency: Dharamshala assembly constituency

Transport, Tribal Development, Printing and Stationery and Law Minister Himachal Pradesh Government
- In office 1998–2003
- Chief Minister: Prem Kumar Dhumal
- Constituency: Dharamshala assembly constituency

Member of the Himachal Pradesh Legislative Assembly
- In office 1990–1998
- Constituency: Dharamshala assembly constituency

Personal details
- Born: 25 June 1951 Kangra, Himachal Pradesh, India
- Died: 1 February 2025 (aged 73) Chandigarh, India
- Spouse: Rekha Kapoor (m. 1990)
- Children: Shashwat Kapoor (son), Pragati Kapoor (daughter)
- Parent(s): Hari Ram; Gulabo Devi
- Occupation: Politician, businessman
- Known for: Social work

Kishan Kapoor (25 June 1951 – 1 February 2025) was an Indian politician who was a member of Bharatiya Janata Party. He was the Member of parliament, Lok Sabha from Kangra Lok Sabha constituency of Himachal Pradesh. He won the seat by a record margin of votes in the 2019 General election. He won by a margin of 4.77 lakh votes which is the 2nd largest voting percentage at 72.2% all over the country. He had previously served as Food, Civil supplies & Consumer Affairs minister in the Himachal Pradesh Government. He served three terms as a Cabinet minister and five terms as a member of the legislative assembly representing the Dharamshala assembly constituency. He was one of the most senior Bhartiya Janta Party leaders from the state.

== Life and career ==
Kapoor was Minister for Food and Civil Supplies, Consumer Affairs and Election in Himachal Pradesh and the member of the legislative assembly (MLA) from Dharamshala assembly constituency. Serving his third term as a minister in the cabinet of Jai Ram Thakur, he previously held important portfolios like Industries, Transport, Town and Country Planning, Urban Development in the Prem Kumar Dhumal Cabinet. During this time, he was accompanied by Jagat Prakash Nadda, National President of the BJP, as his colleague.

Kapoor died in Chandigarh on 1 February 2025, at the age of 73.

== Timeline ==
Kapoor's timeline in politics was a long one, and he plunged into active politics at a relatively young age.

- 1970 Became a member of the Jansangh and the Janta Party
- 1978 Yuva Morcha Secretary
- 1980 Attended the formation of BJP
- 1982–1984 Mandal Adhyaksh BJP Dharamshala
- 1985 Fought first MLA election as a BJP candidate from Dharamshala constituency
- 1990 Represented Dharamshala constituency as an MLA for the BJP
- 1993 Won for the second time from Dharamshala and reached the Vidhan Sabha
- 1993–97 Appointed Chief Whip Vidhan Sabha
- 1994 Appointed the State Executive Member BJP HP
- 1995–97 Remained BJP President Kangra District
- 1996 Appointed BJP Election Incharge for MANIPUR Parliamentary Constituency
- 1998 Won for the third time from Dharamshala constituency
- 1998 Sworn in as Transport, Tribal Development, Printing and Stationery and Law Minister
- 2003 Contested from Dharamshala and lost
- 2004 Appointed State Spokesperson BJP Himachal Pradesh
- 2007 Won for the fourth time from Dharamshala
- 2008 Sworn in as Transport, Urban Development, Housing and Town and Country Planning Minister
- 2009 Portfolios changed to Industries, Labor and Employment and Sainik Welfare Ministries
- 2012 Contested from Dharamshala and lost
- 2017 Won from Dharamshala constituency for the fifth term
- 2017 Sworn in as the Food and Civil Supplies & Consumer Affairs and Election Minister
- 2019 Elected as Member of Parliament from Kangra Parliamentary Constituency for the first time with a record margin of the highest voting percentage in the entire country.
