= Kanwar Durga Chand =

Indian politician

Kanwar Durga Chand (1922 – 17 May 2000) was a leader of the Bharatiya Janata Party from Himachal Pradesh. He was a member of the 6th Lok Sabha from 1977 to 1979 elected from Kangra. He established his office for “Lok Dal” at Palampur on NH17 in a rented accommodation of Late (Major Retd.) Ml Sharma. At present time Hotel Rongla opp. to new subji Mandi is on the same place where Shri Durga Chand ji used to have his office. He was imprisoned in the Emergency for 19 months. He was a Member of Himachal Pradesh Legislative Assembly from 1967 to 1977. He was the leader of Opposition in the assembly from 1972 to 1977. He died on 17 May 2000.
