= Narain Chand Parashar =

Member of the Lok Sabha
- In office 1971–1989
- Preceded by: Prem Chand Verma
- Succeeded by: Prem Kumar Dhumal
- Constituency: Hamirpur, Himachal Pradesh

Member of the Himachal Pradesh Legislative Assembly
- In office 1990–1998
- Preceded by: Prem Dass Pakhrolvi
- Succeeded by: Babu Ram Mandial
- Constituency: Nadaun (Vidhan Sabha constituency)

Personal details
- Born: 2 July 1934 Ferozepur, Punjab, India
- Died: 21 February 2001 (aged 66) Delhi, India
- Party: Indian National Congress

Narain Chand Parashar (2 July 1934 – 21 February 2001) was an Indian parliamentarian, professor, linguist and writer.

He was born in Ferozepur, Punjab, the son of Nand Lal and Phula Devi of the village of Sera in the present day Hamirpur district. Parashar was educated in Kangra district, which then consisted of the present day Kangra, Hamirpur, Una, Kullu, and Lahul and Spiti districts.

He gained BA (Hons) and MA degrees in English language, and went on to teach English at the Tanda in district Hoshiarpur, Punjab and later University of Delhi. Parashar also gained diplomas in the Chinese, Japanese and Bengali languages, and had knowledge of German, Italian, Spanish, Telugu, Tamil and Punjabi.

As a linguist, he wanted to develop the Pahari language, with the aim of reinforcing Himachali cultural identity. He led a popular movement for the inclusion of Pahari as an official language of India in Schedule 8 of the Indian Constitution, a demand currently under the consideration of the Government of India.

Parashar was an author in English, Hindi and Pahari, and was an authority on Parliamentary procedure, Buddhism and on sociopolitical problems of the hilly areas of the country. He also translated the Buddhist texts Dhampadda, Bodhicharyavataara, and Saddharmapundriksutra (the Lotus Sutra) into his native Pahari language. He was awarded a Doctorate by the University of Delhi for his critical analysis of the Bodhicharyavataara.

Professor Parashar was a follower of the ideas of the Indian independence leader Netaji Subhas Chandra Bose, and worked to spread his message. He founded a school in Bose's name in the village of Sera, Hamirpur, and celebrated his birthday every year. Parashar was also a Buddhist scholar, and celebrated Buddha Purnima every year.

Parashar worked to promote the legacy of Himachali leaders and freedom fighters. He wrote the biography of Pahari Gandhi Baba Kanshi Ram, poet and freedom fighter, and was successful in getting a postage stamp released in his honour by the then Prime Minister of India, Indira Gandhi, in 1983.

== Parliamentary career ==
Narain Chand Parashar was elected three times to the Lok Sabha, or lower house of the Parliament of India; the 5th (1971–1977), the 7th (1980–1984), and the 8th Lok Sabha (1984–1989). He received the "Best Parliamentarian Award" for the year 1987, the award being presented by the then Vice-President of India Dr. Shankar Dayal Sharma. Parashar served as the Chairman of the Committee on Government Assurances for four years (1986–89).

Parashar represented India several times in international fora, the United Nations General Assembly sessions in 1980 and in 1986 (New York City), the UNESCO Conference in 1985, and the international conclave to solve the Nicaragua problem, held in Lisbon. Parashar was awarded honorary citizenship of New Jersey, USA in 1986.

Parashar was the only member of the Indian National Congress party to withstand the anti-Congress waves of 1977 and 1990. Subsequent to his landmark win in the 1990 assembly elections Sh. Rajiv Gandhi made Parashar president of the Himachal Pradesh Congress Committee, on 11 June 1990. He campaigned tirelessly for the revival of the party and it resulted in the return of the Congress party to power in the state. He won the Nadaun assembly seat again in 1993 and was the Education minister of the state until 1998. He used his position to get various centrally sponsored schemes sanctioned for Himachal, Sanskrit Vidyapeeth at Kaleshwar in Kangra, Kendriya Vidyalayas in Hamirpur and Nadaun. DPEP (District Primary Education Programme), ICDS schemes for various blocks of the state were introduced. In addition the state's achievements in the field of education, during his tenure, were acclaimed by Dr. Amratya Sen. Parashar died on 21 February 2001 in Delhi.
