= Sullah =

Sullah may refer to

- Sullah (Pakistan), a village in Gujrat District, Punjab
- Sullah (village) in Palampur tehsil in Kangra district of Himachal Pradesh State, India
- Sullah Upazila in Bangladesh

== See also ==
- Sulla (disambiguation)
