= Jaswan Assembly constituency =

Former Legislative Assembly constituency in Himachal Pradesh, India

Coordinates: 30.44°N 77.59°E

Jaswan
- Former constituency for the Himachal Pradesh Legislative Assembly

Constituency details
- Country: India
- Region: North India
- State: Himachal Pradesh
- District: Kangra
- Lok Sabha constituency: Kangra
- Established: 1967
- Abolished: 2008
- Total electors
- Reservation: None

Jaswan was one of the 68 constituencies in the Himachal Pradesh Legislative Assembly of Himachal Pradesh a northern state of India. It was in Kangra district and was a part of Kangra Lok Sabha constituency.

== Member of Legislative Assembly ==
Year	Member	Party
1967	Paras Ram	Communist Party of India
1972	Dr. Saligram	Indian National Congress
1977	Agya Ram Thakur	Janata Party
1982	Agya Ram Thakur	Bharatiya Janata Party
1985	Viplove Thakur	Indian National Congress
1990	Kashmir Singh Rana	Bharatiya Janata Party
1993	Viplove Thakur	Indian National Congress
1998	Viplove Thakur	Indian National Congress
2003	Bikram Singh	Bharatiya Janata Party
2007	Nikhil Rajour	Indian National Congress

== Election results ==
=== Assembly Election 2007 ===
2007 Himachal Pradesh Legislative Assembly election: Jaswan
Party	Candidate	Votes	%	±%
INC	Nikhil Rajour (Manu Sharma)	17,692	46.31%	▲5.03
BJP	Bikram Singh	17,574	46.00%	▼1.30
BSP	Hari Om	2,912	7.62%	▲5.82
Margin of victory		118	0.31%	▼5.71
Turnout		38,203	67.27%	▼4.85
Registered electors		56,794		▲12.76
INC gain from BJP		Swing	▼0.99	

=== Assembly Election 2003 ===
2003 Himachal Pradesh Legislative Assembly election: Jaswan
Party	Candidate	Votes	%	±%
BJP	Bikram Singh	17,180	47.30%	▲16.88
INC	Viplove Thakur	14,994	41.28%	▼8.77
LJP	Ramel Singh	2,445	6.73%	New
HVC	Gokal	667	1.84%	▼15.62
BSP	Pawan Kumar	656	1.81%	▲0.31
NCP	Kush Raj Singh	381	1.05%	New
Margin of victory		2,186	6.02%	▼13.62
Turnout		36,323	72.12%	▲3.11
Registered electors		50,367		▲16.42
BJP gain from INC		Swing	▼2.76	

=== Assembly Election 1998 ===
1998 Himachal Pradesh Legislative Assembly election: Jaswan
Party	Candidate	Votes	%	±%
INC	Viplove Thakur	14,944	50.05%	▼8.52
BJP	Bikram Singh	9,081	30.42%	▼0.24
HVC	Ramel Singh	5,211	17.45%	New
BSP	Ashok Kumar	448	1.50%	▼1.18
JD	Sita Ram	172	0.58%	▼0.38
Margin of victory		5,863	19.64%	▼8.28
Turnout		29,856	69.90%	▼0.79
Registered electors		43,263		▲8.63
INC hold		Swing	▼8.52	

=== Assembly Election 1993 ===
1993 Himachal Pradesh Legislative Assembly election: Jaswan
Party	Candidate	Votes	%	±%
INC	Viplove Thakur	16,283	58.57%	▲15.87
BJP	Kashmir Singh Rana	8,523	30.66%	▼24.11
Independent	Dasaundhi Ram	1,184	4.26%	New
BSP	Ram Bhaj	746	2.68%	▲1.84
Independent	Bhagyawati	607	2.18%	New
JD	Kamla Guleria	265	0.95%	New
Margin of victory		7,760	27.91%	▲15.85
Turnout		27,800	70.32%	▲0.38
Registered electors		39,825		▲6.97
INC gain from BJP		Swing	▲3.81	

=== Assembly Election 1990 ===
1990 Himachal Pradesh Legislative Assembly election: Jaswan
Party	Candidate	Votes	%	±%
BJP	Kashmir Singh Rana	14,155	54.77%	▲27.90
INC	Viplove Thakur	11,036	42.70%	▼29.10
Doordarshi Party	Parkash Chand	286	1.11%	New
BSP	Yash Pal Singh	219	0.85%	New
Margin of victory		3,119	12.07%	▼32.86
Turnout		25,846	70.09%	▼0.96
Registered electors		37,230		▲24.06
BJP gain from INC		Swing	▼17.03	

=== Assembly Election 1985 ===
1985 Himachal Pradesh Legislative Assembly election: Jaswan
Party	Candidate	Votes	%	±%
INC	Viplove Thakur	15,163	71.79%	▲28.60
BJP	Gian Singh	5,674	26.87%	▼24.11
Independent	Surinder Singh Bihal	139	0.66%	New
Independent	Tilak Raj Kaunda	107	0.51%	New
Margin of victory		9,489	44.93%	▲37.15
Turnout		21,120	71.10%	▼0.77
Registered electors		30,009		▲7.27
INC gain from BJP		Swing	▲20.82	

=== Assembly Election 1982 ===
1982 Himachal Pradesh Legislative Assembly election: Jaswan
Party	Candidate	Votes	%	±%
BJP	Agya Ram Thakur	10,147	50.97%	New
INC	Sarla Sharma	8,598	43.19%	New
CPI	Suram Singh	711	3.57%	▼28.72
JP	Naval Kishore Sharma	275	1.38%	▼56.31
LKD	Jagroop Singh Rana	175	0.88%	New
Margin of victory		1,549	7.78%	▼17.62
Turnout		19,906	72.33%	▲23.11
Registered electors		27,976		▼8.83
BJP gain from JP		Swing	▼6.71	

=== Assembly Election 1977 ===
1977 Himachal Pradesh Legislative Assembly election: Jaswan
Party	Candidate	Votes	%	±%
JP	Agya Ram	8,504	57.69%	New
CPI	Paras Ram	4,760	32.29%	▲1.84
Independent	Joginder Singh	507	3.44%	New
Independent	Hem Chand Garg	460	3.12%	New
Independent	Khushi Ram	290	1.97%	New
Independent	Laxmi Prakash Punj	220	1.49%	New
Margin of victory		3,744	25.40%	▲5.73
Turnout		14,741	49.13%	▲8.96
Registered electors		30,684		▲6.03
JP gain from INC		Swing	▲7.57	

=== Assembly Election 1972 ===
1972 Himachal Pradesh Legislative Assembly election: Jaswan
Party	Candidate	Votes	%	±%
INC	Dr. Saligram	5,668	50.11%	▲15.74
CPI	Paras Ram	3,444	30.45%	▼24.14
Independent	Nikka Ram	1,139	10.07%	New
ABJS	Governor Singh	431	3.81%	▼1.20
Independent	Prakash Chand	357	3.16%	New
INC(O)	Bidhi Chand	271	2.40%	New
Margin of victory		2,224	19.66%	▼0.55
Turnout		11,310	40.42%	▼13.25
Registered electors		28,939		▼2.11
INC gain from CPI		Swing	▼4.47	

=== Assembly Election 1967 ===
1967 Himachal Pradesh Legislative Assembly election: Jaswan
Party	Candidate	Votes	%	±%
CPI	Paras Ram	8,446	54.59%	New
INC	B. Ram	5,318	34.37%	New
Independent	B. Ram	932	6.02%	New
ABJS	J. Singh	776	5.02%	New
Margin of victory		3,128	20.22%	
Turnout		15,472	54.91%	
Registered electors		29,563		
CPI win (new seat)				
