= Shamirpur =

- Village
- Location in Himachal Pradesh, India Shamirpur (India) Shamirpur (Asia)
- Coordinates: 32.1201645°N 76.2400746°E
- Country: India
- State: Himachal Pradesh
- District: Kangra

Language
  - Official: Hindi
  - Regional: Kangri
- Time zone: UTC+5:30 (IST)
- Telephone code: +911892

Shamirpur is a village in the Kangra district of the Indian state of Himachal Pradesh. It is located next to National Highway 20, which runs from Pathankot in Punjab to Mandi in Himachal Pradesh. It is easily accessible from Dharmasala. The nearest airport is Gaggal Airport (IATA: DHM, ICAO: VIGG), alternatively known as Kangra Airport or Dharamsala-Kangra Airport, which is located in Gaggal near Kangra, 14 kilometres (8.7 mi) southwest of Dharamshala.

The economy of Shamirpur consists primarily of agriculture and business.

== History of Kangra ==
This region, commonly known as Dev Bhumi, is believed to be the abode of gods.

There is a mention of the Trigarta (Kangra) kingdom in the Sanskrit epic Mahabharata. Sir Lepel Griffin references the Rajput dynasties of the hills, of which the Katochs’ is the oldest. The Mahabharata mentions King Susharama Chandra, who sided with the Kauravas, said to be the founder of this dynasty. At that time, Kangra was supposedly known as Bhim Kot. The reference to the prosperous Kingdom of Trigarta (Kangra) is found in Panani literature. The mention of Kangra (Nagarkot) is also found in the works of Ferishta.

In a later period, perhaps that of the Muhammadan invasion, the Katoch princes were driven into the hills where Kangra was one of their main fortresses. In spite of constant invasions, the little Hindu kingdoms (secure within their Himalayan glens) held out against the aggressive Muhammadan power for a long period.

In 1009 the riches of the Nagarkot temple attracted the attention of Mahmud of Ghazni, who defeated the Hindu princess at Peshawar, seized the fort of Kangra, and plundered the immense booty of gold, silver and jewels from the shrine.

After this time, Kangra does not re-appear in general history until 1360, when the emperor Firoz Tughlak led another force against it. The Raja submitted and was permitted to retain his dominion but the Muhammadans once more plundered the temple.

In 1556, Akbar launched an expedition into the hills and occupied the fort of Kangra. Kangra passed to the British at the end of the first Sikh War in 1846 and there were several revolts against them. Ram Singh, a Pathania Rajput, invaded the British garrison at Shahpur. The British immediately rushed their forces, which surrounded Shahpur fort. Ram Singh finding himself at a disadvantageous position sneaked into the nearby forest to rearm himself.

After the outbreak of the Mutiny in 1857, some disturbances took place in the Kulu subdivision. Local authorities took precautions; Executing the six ring leaders and imprisoning the others. This became the first overt act of rebellion and effectively subdued the tendency to lawlessness. The disarming of the native troops in the forts of Kangra and Nurpur occurred quietly and without opposition. The national movement in Kangra district was spearheaded by Comrade Ram Chandra, Thakur Panchan Chandra, and Baba Kanshi Ram.

Baba Kanshi Ram did a great deal for the liberation movement in Kangra district, where he was responsible for the liberation movement in the hills. He was given the title of "Hill Gandhi" by Jawahar Lal Nehru for his work and "Bulbule Hills" for his melodious throat by Sarojini Naidu.

With the freedom of British India, Kangra district escaped foreign rule and entered an era of democracy.

== Artifacts ==
The focal theme of painting in this region is Srinagar (the erotic sentiment). The subjects that were seen in painting exhibit the taste and traits of the lifestyle in society during that period. Bhakti cult was the driving force and the love story of Radha and Krishna was the main source of spiritual experience, which was also the base for the visual expression. Bhagvata Purana and the love poems Gita-Govinda of Jaidev were the most popular subjects dealing with the legends and the amorous plays of Radha and Krishna symbolising the soul's devotion to God. In some miniatures, the blue-god Krishna is seen dancing in the lush woodlands and every maiden's eye are drawn to him. Krishna subjects, known commonly as Krishna-Lila predominate, while the themes of love, inspired by the Nayaks, Nayikas, and Baramasa enjoyed great favour. The sentiment of love remained the inspiration and the central theme of Pahari painting.

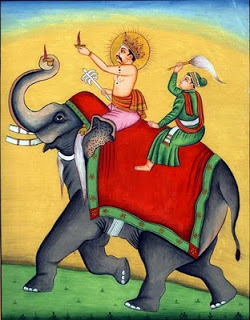
Kangra paintings

== Geography ==
Shamirpur is a hilly area surrounded by valleys. The Kangra valley represents a longitudinal trough which is at the foothills of Dhauladhar range. The literal meaning of Dhauladhar is 'The White Peak' whose mean elevation is 4,550 metres (14,930 ft). The range has a very steep rise and rises 3,600 metres (11,800 ft) above the Kangra valley. The largest but the lesser known of the Himalayan ranges is the Pir Panjal. It branches off the Great Himalayan Range near the bank of the Sutlej. Rohtang Pass, a major tourist destination which greets you at a height of 4,800 metres (15,700 ft), and lies in the Pir Panjal along with a number of glaciers and passes.

== Socio-economy ==
The economy of Kangra District consists mostly of agriculture and farming. Tea cultivation plays a vital role in the economy. "Kangra Tea" is famous worldwide for its rich aroma, color, and taste. A few other industries that have been established in the region include water packaging, construction materials, and potato chips.
