= Simbal Khola =

- village
- Location in Himachal Pradesh, India Simbal Khola (India)
- Coordinates: 32.110169°N 76.27606°E
- Country: India
- State: Himachal Pradesh
- District: Kangra

Languages
  - Official: Hindi
- Time zone: UTC+5:30 (IST)

Simbal Khola is a village in the Kangra District of Himachal Pradesh
