= Viplove Thakur =

Member of the Parliament of India

Smt. Viplove Thakur
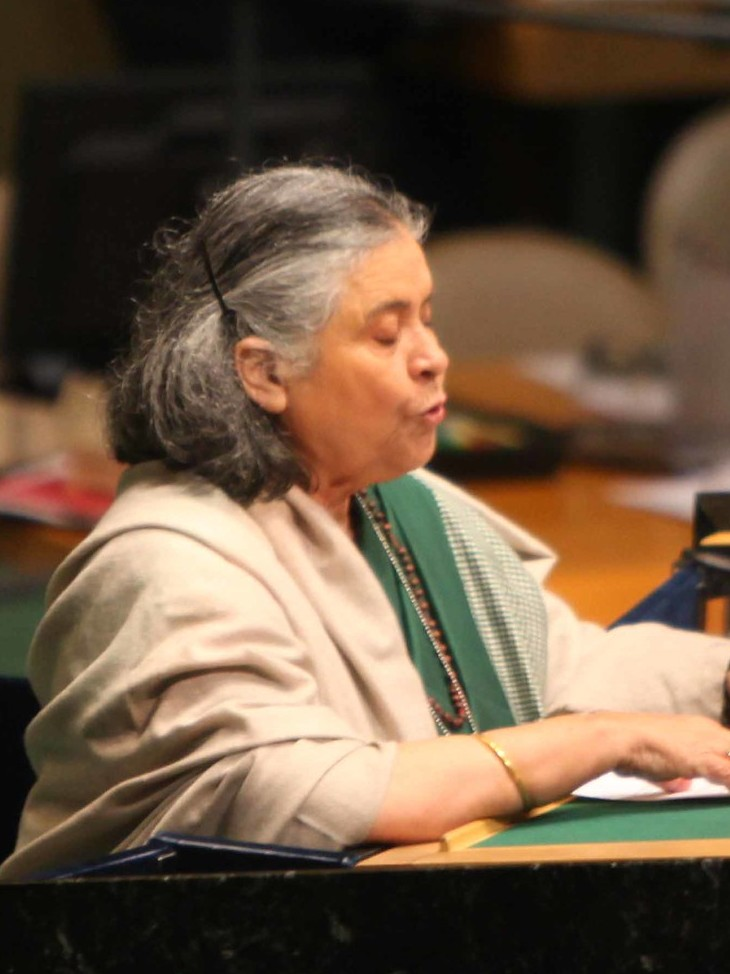

Member of Parliament Rajya sabha
- In office 10 April 2014 – 9 April 2020
- Succeeded by: Indu Goswami
- Constituency: Himachal Pradesh
- In office 2006–2012
- Preceded by: Jagat Prakash Nadda
- Constituency: Himachal Pradesh

Member of Himachal Pradesh Vidhan Sabha
- In office 1985–1990
- In office 1993–2003

Minister of State (Independent charge), Indian System of Medicines, Government of HP
- In office 1995–1998

Personal details
- Born: 4 October 1943 (age 81); Dharamshala, Kangra, Himachal Pradesh
- Political party: Indian National Congress
- Spouse: Late Shri Thakur Harnam Singh
- Children: 2
- Profession: Social Worker

Viplove Thakur (born 4 October 1943) is an Indian politician. A senior leader of the Indian National Congress party, she has been a member of the Parliament of India. Thakur has represented Himachal Pradesh in the Rajya Sabha, the upper house of the Parliament since April, 2006. She retired from the Upper House in April, 2020.

== Family ==
She comes from a freedom fighter family of Himachal Pradesh. Her father late Sh. Paras Ram was a freedom fighter from Himachal Pradesh and a leader of the Communist Party of India. Her mother late Smt. Sarla Sharma was also a prominent leader of the Indian National Congress.

== Electoral performance ==
2003 Himachal Pradesh Legislative Assembly election: Jaswan
| Party | Candidate | Votes | % | ±% |
|---|---|---|---|---|
| BJP | Bikram Singh | 17,180 | 47.30% | ▲16.88 |
| INC | Viplove Thakur | 14,994 | 41.28% | ▼8.77 |
| LJP | Ramel Singh | 2,445 | 6.73% | New |
| HVC | Gokal | 667 | 1.84% | ▼15.62 |
| BSP | Pawan Kumar | 656 | 1.81% | ▲0.31 |
| NCP | Kush Raj Singh | 381 | 1.05% | New |
| Margin of victory | | 2,186 | 6.02% | ▼13.62 |
| Turnout | | 36,323 | 72.12% | ▲3.11 |
| Registered electors | | 50,367 | | ▲16.42 |
| BJP gain from INC | | Swing | ▼2.76 | |

1998 Himachal Pradesh Legislative Assembly election: Jaswan
| Party | Candidate | Votes | % | ±% |
|---|---|---|---|---|
| INC | Viplove Thakur | 14,944 | 50.05% | ▼8.52 |
| BJP | Bikram Singh | 9,081 | 30.42% | ▼0.24 |
| HVC | Ramel Singh | 5,211 | 17.45% | New |
| BSP | Ashok Kumar | 448 | 1.50% | ▼1.18 |
| JD | Sita Ram | 172 | 0.58% | ▼0.38 |
| Margin of victory | | 5,863 | 19.64% | ▼8.28 |
| Turnout | | 29,856 | 69.90% | ▼0.79 |
| Registered electors | | 43,263 | | ▲8.63 |
| INC hold | | Swing | ▼8.52 | |

1993 Himachal Pradesh Legislative Assembly election: Jaswan
| Party | Candidate | Votes | % | ±% |
|---|---|---|---|---|
| INC | Viplove Thakur | 16,283 | 58.57% | ▲15.87 |
| BJP | Kashmir Singh Rana | 8,523 | 30.66% | ▼24.11 |
| Independent | Dasaundhi Ram | 1,184 | 4.26% | New |
| BSP | Ram Bhaj | 746 | 2.68% | ▲1.84 |
| Independent | Bhagyawati | 607 | 2.18% | New |
| JD | Kamla Guleria | 265 | 0.95% | New |
| Margin of victory | | 7,760 | 27.91% | ▲15.85 |
| Turnout | | 27,800 | 70.32% | ▲0.38 |
| Registered electors | | 39,825 | | ▲6.97 |
| INC gain from BJP | | Swing | ▲3.81 | |

1990 Himachal Pradesh Legislative Assembly election: Jaswan
| Party | Candidate | Votes | % | ±% |
|---|---|---|---|---|
| BJP | Kashmir Singh Rana | 14,155 | 54.77% | ▲27.90 |
| INC | Viplove Thakur | 11,036 | 42.70% | ▼29.10 |
| Doordarshi Party | Parkash Chand | 286 | 1.11% | New |
| BSP | Yash Pal Singh | 219 | 0.85% | New |
| Margin of victory | | 3,119 | 12.07% | ▼32.86 |
| Turnout | | 25,846 | 70.09% | ▼0.96 |
| Registered electors | | 37,230 | | ▲24.06 |
| BJP gain from INC | | Swing | ▼17.03 | |

1985 Himachal Pradesh Legislative Assembly election: Jaswan
| Party | Candidate | Votes | % | ±% |
|---|---|---|---|---|
| INC | Viplove Thakur | 15,163 | 71.79% | ▲28.60 |
| BJP | Gian Singh | 5,674 | 26.87% | ▼24.11 |
| Independent | Surinder Singh Bihal | 139 | 0.66% | New |
| Independent | Tilak Raj Kaunda | 107 | 0.51% | New |
| Margin of victory | | 9,489 | 44.93% | ▲37.15 |
| Turnout | | 21,120 | 71.10% | ▼0.77 |
| Registered electors | | 30,009 | | ▲7.27 |
| INC gain from BJP | | Swing | ▲20.82 | |

== Positions held ==
- 1985–90, 1993–98 and 1998-2003 Member, Himachal Pradesh Legislative Assembly.
- 1995-98 Minister of State (Independent charge), Indian System of Medicines, Government of Himachal Pradesh.
- Aug. 2003 - March 2006 Chairperson, State Commission for Women, Himachal Pradesh.
- April 2006 Elected to Rajya Sabha.
- June 2006 - Nov. 2006 Member, Committee on Science and Technology, Environment and Forests.
- Aug. 2006 - July 2008 President, Himachal Pradesh Congress Committee.
- Aug. 2006 - May 2009 Member, Committee on Defence.
- Nov. 2006 - May 2009 & Aug. 2009 - April 2012 Member, Committee on Health and Family Welfare.
- July 2007 - May 2009 Member, India-U.S.A. Parliamentary Friendship Group.
- Aug. 2007 - April 2012 Member, Post-Graduate Institute of Medical Education and Research (PGIMER), Chandigarh.
- May 2008 - Sept. 2009 Member, Committee on Government Assurances.
- May 2008 - May 2009 Member, Consultative Committee for the Ministry of Women and Child Development.
- Aug. 2008 - May 2009 Member, Hindi Salahkar Samiti of the Ministry of Commerce and Industry.
- Sept. 2009 - May 2010 Member, Committee on Petitions.
- Sept. 2009 - April 2012 Member, Consultative Committee for the Ministry of Road Transport and Highways.
- March 2010 - April 2012 Member, Agricultural and Processed Food Products Export Development Authority (APEDA).
- December 2010 - April 2012 Member, Central Advisory Committee for the National Cadet Corps.
- Jan. 2010 - April 2012 Member, Hindi Salahkar Samiti of the Ministry of Health and Family Welfare.
- May 2011 - April 2012 Member, Sub-Committee-I to examine the functioning of AIIMS of the Committee of Health and Family Welfare.
- April 2014 Elected to Rajya Sabha (Second term).
