= Naleti =

- Village
- Interactive map of Naleti
- Coordinates: 31.89°N 76.23°E
- Country: India
- Region: North India
- State Government: Himachal Pradesh

Government
  - Member of Parliament (MP): Anurag Thakur
  - Member of Legislative Assembly (MLA): Hoshiyar Singh
  - Panchayat Pradhan: Ankush
- Elevation: 478 m (1,568 ft)

Population
  - Total: 1,382
- Time zone: UTC+5:30 (IST)
- PIN: 177104
- Telephone code: 91-1970
- Vehicle registration: HP-36

Naleti is a small hamlet along the left bank of the Beas River. This village forms a part of Dehra subdivision of Kangra district of Himachal Pradesh, the hill state of India. Naleti comprises three revenue villages: Bhardyal, Bulla (Pandit), and Samdol.

== Demographics ==
As per 2011 Census, the population of Naleti is 1382.

Name of Village	Males	Females	Total
Bhardyal	157	177	334
Naleti	276	268	544
Samdol	242	262	504
Total	675	707	1382

== Geography ==
Naleti is located in Dehra Tehsil of District Kangra. It is just 2 km each from Sunhet and Nehran Pukhar both located At National Highway 503.

Naleti is famous for its seven villages.

Bhardyal segment comprises Bhardiyal, Kaachh and Jakharad villages

Samdol segment comprises Buhla and Samdol villages

Naleti segment comprises Kurad (Thathla) and Upla Duar villages

The village lies in between Kulahar khadd bordering the North eastern boundary of the village and Balla khad in the South just below the Kendriya Vidyalya.

== Education ==
There are numerous educational institutes within the village and the close vicinity. Kendriya Vidyalaya Naleti is the prominent school in Naleti, managed by the Ministry of Education, Govt of India.

Vedvyas campus of Central Sanskrit University (earlier known as Rashtriya Sanskrit Samsthanam, a Deemed University run by Ministry of Education, Govt of India is located in Balahar, which lies in Ward No 7 Masot in Naleti Village Panchayat.

Govt. Senior Secondary School Pragpur is located on the Southern border of Naleti.

There is also a state government run middle school and a primary school.
