= Dhanotu =

Dhanotu may refer to:

- Dhanotu, Mandi district, a village in Mandi district
- Dhanotu, Kangra district, a village in Kangra district

Both villages are located in the state of Himachal Pradesh in India.
