= Arun Kumar (Himachal Pradesh politician) =

Indian politician

Ex-MLA, Himachal Pradesh Legislative Assembly
- In office 2017–2022
- Preceded by: G. S. Bali
- Constituency: Nagrota

Personal details
- Born: 26 June 1964 (age 61) Nagrota, Kangra, Himachal Pradesh
- Party: Bhartiya Janta Party
- Parent(s): Atma Ram; Bimla Devi

Arun Kumar (born 26 June 1964) is an Indian politician, who currently serves as Member of Legislative Assembly from Nagrota constituency. Arun Kumar won first time from Nagrota constituency in 2017 state assembly elections.

== Early life and education ==
Arun Kumar was born on 26 June 1964 in Nagrota, Kangra district, Himachal Pradesh to Atma Ram and Bimla Devi.

Arun Kumar had Diploma in Electronics.

== Politics ==
Arun Kumar active politics started from 2001. He became Member of Municipal Council Nagrota Bagwan from January 2001 to January, 2017, four times in the period. Also he was Vice President of Municipal Council Nagrota Bagwan from 19 January 2006 to 2010 & 1 February 2011 to November, 2016. He became BJP State Executive in 2015.

He fought Himachal Pradesh Legislative Assembly Election in 2012 as an Independent candidate and lost by a margin of 1137 votes.

Then in 2017, he was elected to the thirteenth Himachal Pradesh Legislative Assembly in December, 2017.
