= Paras Ram =

Indian politician

Member of the Himachal Pradesh Legislative Assembly
- In office 1967–1972
- Preceded by: B. Ram
- Constituency: Jaswan

Personal details
- Party: Communist Party of India

Paras Ram was an Indian politician and leader of Communist Party of India from Himachal Pradesh. He represented Jaswan constituency from 1967 to 1972.

== Electoral performance ==
1977 Himachal Pradesh Legislative Assembly election: Jaswan
Party	Candidate	Votes	%	±%
JP	Agya Ram	8,504	57.69%	New
CPI	Paras Ram	4,760	32.29%	▲1.84
Independent	Joginder Singh	507	3.44%	New
Independent	Hem Chand Garg	460	3.12%	New
Independent	Khushi Ram	290	1.97%	New
Independent	Laxmi Prakash Punj	220	1.49%	New
Margin of victory		3,744	25.40%	▲5.73
Turnout		14,741	49.13%	▲8.96
Registered electors		30,684		▲6.03
JP gain from INC		Swing	▲7.57	

1972 Himachal Pradesh Legislative Assembly election: Jaswan
Party	Candidate	Votes	%	±%
INC	Dr. Saligram	5,668	50.11%	▲15.74
CPI	Paras Ram	3,444	30.45%	▼24.14
Independent	Nikka Ram	1,139	10.07%	New
ABJS	Governor Singh	431	3.81%	▼1.20
Independent	Prakash Chand	357	3.16%	New
INC(O)	Bidhi Chand	271	2.40%	New
Margin of victory		2,224	19.66%	▼0.55
Turnout		11,310	40.42%	▼13.25
Registered electors		28,939		▼2.11
INC gain from CPI		Swing	▼4.47	

1967 Himachal Pradesh Legislative Assembly election: Jaswan
Party	Candidate	Votes	%	±%
CPI	Paras Ram	8,446	54.59%	New
INC	B. Ram	5,318	34.37%	New
Independent	B. Ram	932	6.02%	New
ABJS	J. Singh	776	5.02%	New
Margin of victory		3,128	20.22%	
Turnout		15,472	54.91%	
Registered electors		29,563		
CPI win (new seat)				
