= Bikram Singh (politician) =

Indian politician

Cabinet Minister, Government of Himachal Pradesh
- In office 27 December 2017 – 8 December 2022.
- Governor: Acharya Devvrat; Kalraj Mishra; Bandaru Dattatreya; Rajendra Arlekar
- Cabinet: Jai Ram Thakur ministry
- Chief Minister: Jai Ram Thakur
- Ministry and Departments: Industry; Education; Labour and Employment; Transport

Member of the Himachal Pradesh Legislative Assembly
- Incumbent
- Assumed office 20 December 2012
- Preceded by: Constituency Established
- Constituency: Jaswan-Pragpur

Personal details
- Born: 28 August 1964 (age 61) Jaswan, Kangra district, Himachal Pradesh, India
- Party: Bharatiya Janata Party
- Spouse: Mamta Singh
- Children: 1 Son
- Parent: Kishan Chand (father)
- Education: B.Sc., B.Ed

Bikram Singh (also spelt Vikram Singh) is an Indian politician and member of the Bharatiya Janata Party. Singh is a member of the Himachal Pradesh Legislative Assembly and represents the Jaswan-Pragpur (Vidhan Sabha constituency). Singh was the Industry Minister in the Himachal Pradesh Government.

== Early life and family ==
Born on 28 August 1964, in Village Jole, Tehsil Jaswan, Distt. Kangra, Hans Raj Bikram Singh is the son of Shri Kishan Chand. He is a devoted family man, married to Smt. Mamta, and they are blessed with one son and one daughter.

== Educational Background ==
Hans Raj Bikram Singh holds a B.Sc. and B.Ed., reflecting his commitment to education.

== Political Journey ==
Hans Raj Bikram Singh entered the political arena and was first elected to the State Legislative Assembly in 2003 from the Jaswan Assembly segment. He was re-elected in 2012 and December 2017 from the redefined Jaswan-Pragpur constituency after delimitation in 2007.

== Leadership roles ==
Throughout his political career, Hans Raj Bikram Singh has taken on significant leadership roles. He served as the Vice-Chairman of the H.P. Khadi & Gramudyog Board from 1999 to 2003 and the H.P. Forest Corporation from 2008 to 2012. He has been actively involved in party leadership, serving as the President of State BJYM in 2000 and later as the Vice-President of State BJP in 2008.

== Ministerial Portfolios ==
Hans Raj Bikram Singh has contributed to the governance of the state by holding various ministerial portfolios. From 27 December 2017 to 8 December 2022, he served as the Industries Minister, overseeing key areas such as Labour Employment, Technical Education and Vocational, Industrial Training. Additionally, he took on the portfolio of Transport from 31 July 2020 to 8 December 2022.

== Recent Political Achievements ==
Elected to the State Legislative Assembly for the fourth term in December 2022, Hans Raj Bikram Singh continues to serve his constituency. He has been nominated as a Member of the Public Undertakings, Human Development & Member Amenities Committees.

== Languages known ==
Fluent in Hindi and English, Hans Raj Bikram Singh possesses strong linguistic skills for effective communication.

Hans Raj Bikram Singh stands as a seasoned politician with a rich history of public service, contributing to various sectors and demonstrating leadership at both the party and ministerial levels.

== Electoral performance ==
2022 Himachal Pradesh Legislative Assembly election: Jaswan-Pragpur
Party	Candidate	Votes	%	±%
BJP	Bikram Singh	22,658	38.27%	▼7.31
INC	Surinder Singh Mankotia	20,869	35.25%	▼6.74
Independent	Sanjay Prashar	13,405	22.64%	New
Independent	Mukesh Kumar	1,658	2.80%	New
NOTA	Nota	259	0.44%	▼0.22
BSP	Prem Chand	189	0.32%	New
AAP	Sahil Chouhan	163	0.28%	New
Margin of victory		1,789	3.02%	▼0.58
Turnout		59,201	74.13%	▲3.52
Registered electors		79,856		▲9.01
BJP hold		Swing	▼7.31	

2017 Himachal Pradesh Legislative Assembly election: Jaswan-Pragpur
Party	Candidate	Votes	%	±%
BJP	Bikram Singh	23,583	45.59%	▼1.28
INC	Surinder Singh Mankotia	21,721	41.99%	▲8.10
Independent	Hans Raj	4,075	7.88%	New
Independent	Gagan Deep Prashar	428	0.83%	New
Independent	Mujesh Kumar	395	0.76%	New
NOTA	None of the Above	342	0.66%	New
Margin of victory		1,862	3.60%	▼9.38
Turnout		51,731	70.62%	▲1.73
Registered electors		73,257		▲7.51
BJP hold		Swing	▼1.28	

2012 Himachal Pradesh Legislative Assembly election: Jaswan-Pragpur
Party	Candidate	Votes	%	±%
BJP	Bikram Singh	22,000	46.87%	New
INC	Nikhil Rajour	15,907	33.89%	New
HLC	Naveen Dhiman	6,982	14.87%	New
Himachal Swabhiman Party	Dinesh Kumar	818	1.74%	New
AITC	Rajinder Kumar	391	0.83%	New
Independent	Om Prakash	381	0.81%	New
BSP	Rajinder Singh	307	0.65%	New
Margin of victory		6,093	12.98%	
Turnout		46,939	68.89%	
Registered electors		68,140		
BJP win (new seat)				

2007 Himachal Pradesh Legislative Assembly election: Jaswan
Party	Candidate	Votes	%	±%
INC	Nikhil Rajour (Manu Sharma)	17,692	46.31%	▲5.03
BJP	Bikram Singh	17,574	46.00%	▼1.30
BSP	Hari Om	2,912	7.62%	▲5.82
Margin of victory		118	0.31%	▼5.71
Turnout		38,203	67.27%	▼4.85
Registered electors		56,794		▲12.76
INC gain from BJP		Swing	▼0.99	

2003 Himachal Pradesh Legislative Assembly election: Jaswan
Party	Candidate	Votes	%	±%
BJP	Bikram Singh	17,180	47.30%	▲16.88
INC	Viplove Thakur	14,994	41.28%	▼8.77
LJP	Ramel Singh	2,445	6.73%	New
HVC	Gokal	667	1.84%	▼15.62
BSP	Pawan Kumar	656	1.81%	▲0.31
NCP	Kush Raj Singh	381	1.05%	New
Margin of victory		2,186	6.02%	▼13.62
Turnout		36,323	72.12%	▲3.11
Registered electors		50,367		▲16.42
BJP gain from INC		Swing	▼2.76	

1998 Himachal Pradesh Legislative Assembly election: Jaswan
Party	Candidate	Votes	%	±%
INC	Viplove Thakur	14,944	50.05%	▼8.52
BJP	Bikram Singh	9,081	30.42%	▼0.24
HVC	Ramel Singh	5,211	17.45%	New
BSP	Ashok Kumar	448	1.50%	▼1.18
JD	Sita Ram	172	0.58%	▼0.38
Margin of victory		5,863	19.64%	▼8.28
Turnout		29,856	69.90%	▼0.79
Registered electors		43,263		▲8.63
INC hold		Swing	▼8.52	
