= Bakarawan =

Bakarawan is a small village in the Kangra district of Himachal Pradesh, India. Most people of this village are farmers. According to the 2011 census it has a population of 602 living in 128 households. Its main agriculture product is maize growing.
