= Ramesh Chand Dhawala =

Indian politician (born 1951)

- Constituency: Jawalamukhi
- In office 25 December 2012 – 18 December 2017
- Succeeded by: Ramesh Chand Dhawala

Personal details
- Born: 12 April 1951 (age 75) Dehra, Kangra, Himachal Pradesh, India
- Party: Bharatiya Janata Party
- Spouse: House Wife
- Education: Higher Secondary
- Profession: Social Worker

Ramesh Chand Dhawala (born 12 April 1951) is an Indian politician and member of the Bharatiya Janata Party. Ramesh was a member of the Himachal Pradesh Legislative Assembly from the Jawalamukhi Assembly constituency in Kangra district. He contested and won elections from Jawalamukhi constituency in Himachal Pradesh in 2012. Dhawala is become 13th Himachal Assembly pro tem Speaker.
