= Surinder Singh Mankotia =

Indian politician (born 1964)

- Constituency: Jaswan-Pragpur Assembly constituency
- Succeeded by: Surinder Singh Mankotia

Personal details
- Born: 21 April 1964 (age 62) Kangra, Himachal Pradesh, India
- Party: Indian National Congress
- Education: Post Graduate
- Profession: Social Worker

Surinder Singh Mankotia is an Indian politician associated with the Indian National Congress (INC). He contested the 2022 Himachal Pradesh Legislative Assembly election as the INC candidate from the Jaswan-Pragpur constituency, ultimately finishing as the runner-up. He served as a Gazetted Officer under the Government of Himachal Pradesh. He also contested from Jaswan-Pragpur in the 2017 assembly elections.
