= Nagrota, Himachal Pradesh Assembly constituency =

Legislative Assembly constituency in Himachal Pradesh State, India

Coordinates: 31.84°N 76.31°E

Nagrota
- Constituency No. 15 for the Himachal Pradesh Legislative Assembly

Constituency details
- Country: India
- Region: North India
- State: Himachal Pradesh
- District: Kangra
- Lok Sabha constituency: Kangra
- Established: 1967
- Total electors: 90,962
- Reservation: None

Member of Legislative Assembly
- 14th Himachal Pradesh Legislative Assembly
- Incumbent Raghubir Singh Bali
- Party: Indian National Congress
- Elected year: 2022

Nagrota Assembly constituency is one of the 68 constituencies in the Himachal Pradesh Legislative Assembly of Himachal Pradesh a northern state of India. Nagrota is also part of the Kangra Lok Sabha constituency.

== Members of Legislative Assembly ==
Year	Member	Picture	Party
1967	Hardyal Choudhary		Indian National Congress
1972	Hardyal Choudhary		Indian National Congress
1977	Hardyal Choudhary		Indian National Congress
1982	Ram Chand Bhatia		Bharatiya Janata Party
1985	Ram Chand Bhatia		Bharatiya Janata Party
1990	Ram Chand Bhatia		Bharatiya Janata Party
1993	Hardyal Choudhary		Independent
1998	Gurmukh Singh Bali		Indian National Congress
2003	Gurmukh Singh Bali		Indian National Congress
2007	Gurmukh Singh Bali		Indian National Congress
2012	Gurmukh Singh Bali		Indian National Congress
2017	Arun Kumar		Bharatiya Janata Party
2022	Raghubir Singh Bali		Indian National Congress

== Election results ==
=== Assembly Election 2022 ===
2022 Himachal Pradesh Legislative Assembly election: Nagrota
Party	Candidate	Votes	%	±%
INC	Raghubir Singh Bali	42,079	59.88%	▲12.38
BJP	Arun Kumar	26,187	37.26%	▼11.76
AAP	Uma Kant	1,332	1.90%	New
NOTA	Nota	385	0.55%	▼0.29
Margin of victory		15,892	22.61%	▲21.08
Turnout		70,275	77.26%	▼2.69
Registered electors		90,962		▲11.28
INC gain from BJP		Swing	▲10.85	

=== Assembly Election 2017 ===
2017 Himachal Pradesh Legislative Assembly election: Nagrota
Party	Candidate	Votes	%	±%
BJP	Arun Kumar	32,039	49.03%	▲33.12
INC	G. S. Bali	31,039	47.50%	▲4.77
NOTA	None of the Above	547	0.84%	New
Independent	Navneet	384	0.59%	New
BSP	Pinki Devi	344	0.53%	New
Margin of victory		1,000	1.53%	▼3.43
Turnout		65,352	79.95%	▲5.80
Registered electors		81,742		▲9.61
BJP gain from INC		Swing	▲6.30	

=== Assembly Election 2012 ===
2012 Himachal Pradesh Legislative Assembly election: Nagrota
Party	Candidate	Votes	%	±%
INC	G. S. Bali	23,626	42.73%	▼10.83
Independent	Arun Kumar	20,883	37.77%	New
BJP	Chaudhary Mangal Singh	8,793	15.90%	▼26.81
CPI	Charan Dass Choudhary	684	1.24%	New
Himachal Swabhiman Party	Mulkh Raj Sharma	445	0.80%	New
AITC	Col. Shakti Chand	343	0.62%	New
Margin of victory		2,743	4.96%	▼5.89
Turnout		55,293	74.15%	▼0.35
Registered electors		74,574		▲4.84
INC hold		Swing	▼10.83	

=== Assembly Election 2007 ===
2007 Himachal Pradesh Legislative Assembly election: Nagrota
Party	Candidate	Votes	%	±%
INC	G. S. Bali	28,381	53.56%	▼4.09
BJP	Mangal Singh Chaudhary	22,630	42.71%	▲6.52
BSP	Bhag Singh Chaudhary	991	1.87%	▲0.77
LJP	Deepak Sharma	930	1.76%	▲0.89
Margin of victory		5,751	10.85%	▼10.60
Turnout		52,988	74.49%	▼4.06
Registered electors		71,131		▲15.36
INC hold		Swing	▼4.09	

=== Assembly Election 2003 ===
2003 Himachal Pradesh Legislative Assembly election: Nagrota
Party	Candidate	Votes	%	±%
INC	G. S. Bali	27,925	57.65%	▲13.42
BJP	Ch. Ram Chand Bhatia	17,531	36.19%	▼4.95
HVC	Ramesh Kumar	835	1.72%	▼7.65
BSP	Chandu Lal	534	1.10%	New
LJP	Mulakh Raj	421	0.87%	New
Independent	Shakti Chand Chaudhary	416	0.86%	New
SP	Sushma Behl	406	0.84%	▼0.45
NCP	Bikram Singh	370	0.76%	New
Margin of victory		10,394	21.46%	▲18.37
Turnout		48,438	78.62%	▲4.72
Registered electors		61,659		▲14.81
INC hold		Swing	▲13.42	

=== Assembly Election 1998 ===
1998 Himachal Pradesh Legislative Assembly election: Nagrota
Party	Candidate	Votes	%	±%
INC	G. S. Bali	17,538	44.23%	▲31.70
BJP	Ram Chand	16,314	41.14%	▲13.22
HVC	Purushotam Choudhary	3,717	9.37%	New
CPI	Madan Lal Choudhary	1,404	3.54%	▲1.09
SP	Hardyal Choudhary	511	1.29%	New
Margin of victory		1,224	3.09%	▼20.40
Turnout		39,653	74.67%	▼1.54
Registered electors		53,705		▲9.05
INC gain from Independent		Swing	▼7.18	

=== Assembly Election 1993 ===
1993 Himachal Pradesh Legislative Assembly election: Nagrota
Party	Candidate	Votes	%	±%
Independent	Hardyal Choudhary	19,085	51.41%	New
BJP	Chaudhary Ram Chand	10,366	27.92%	▼25.58
INC	Parshotam Lal Choudhary	4,651	12.53%	▼26.00
Independent	Mulhh Raj Sharma	1,386	3.73%	New
CPI	Dev Raj	908	2.45%	▼3.43
BSP	Madan Lal	303	0.82%	New
	Ramesh Choudhary	277	0.75%	New
Margin of victory		8,719	23.49%	▲8.50
Turnout		37,122	75.91%	▲2.61
Registered electors		49,249		▲10.56
Independent gain from BJP		Swing	▼2.10	

=== Assembly Election 1990 ===
1990 Himachal Pradesh Legislative Assembly election: Nagrota
Party	Candidate	Votes	%	±%
BJP	Ram Chand	17,346	53.51%	▲6.10
INC	Hardyal	12,489	38.53%	▼7.48
CPI	Madan Lal	1,904	5.87%	▲0.73
Independent	Dalip Kumar	216	0.67%	New
Margin of victory		4,857	14.98%	▲13.58
Turnout		32,417	73.42%	▼4.55
Registered electors		44,547		▲30.33
BJP hold		Swing	▲6.10	

=== Assembly Election 1985 ===
1985 Himachal Pradesh Legislative Assembly election: Nagrota
Party	Candidate	Votes	%	±%
BJP	Ram Chand	12,530	47.41%	▼3.46
INC	Hardyal	12,158	46.00%	▲8.69
CPI	Madan Lal	1,359	5.14%	▼2.47
Independent	Swami Shanta Nand	224	0.85%	New
Independent	Virender Kumar Chaudhari	157	0.59%	New
Margin of victory		372	1.41%	▼12.16
Turnout		26,428	78.38%	▼0.64
Registered electors		34,181		▲7.43
BJP hold		Swing	▼3.46	

=== Assembly Election 1982 ===
1982 Himachal Pradesh Legislative Assembly election: Nagrota
Party	Candidate	Votes	%	±%
BJP	Ram Chand	12,618	50.87%	New
INC	Hardyal	9,254	37.31%	▼23.97
CPI	Bidhi Chand	1,889	7.62%	New
JP	Kanshi Ram	1,042	4.20%	▼30.97
Margin of victory		3,364	13.56%	▼12.55
Turnout		24,803	79.22%	▲10.36
Registered electors		31,816		▲13.10
BJP gain from INC		Swing	▼10.41	

=== Assembly Election 1977 ===
1977 Himachal Pradesh Legislative Assembly election: Nagrota
Party	Candidate	Votes	%	±%
INC	Hardyal	11,652	61.28%	▲8.82
JP	Saminder Prakash	6,687	35.17%	New
Independent	Jai Kishen	675	3.55%	New
Margin of victory		4,965	26.11%	▼0.61
Turnout		19,014	68.77%	▲27.67
Registered electors		28,130		▲4.59
INC hold		Swing	▲8.82	

=== Assembly Election 1972 ===
1972 Himachal Pradesh Legislative Assembly election: Nagrota
Party	Candidate	Votes	%	±%
INC	Hardayal	5,633	52.46%	▼5.23
Independent	Tuls Ram	2,764	25.74%	New
Independent	Gian Chand	2,080	19.37%	New
Independent	Chander Mani	260	2.42%	New
Margin of victory		2,869	26.72%	▼4.04
Turnout		10,737	41.07%	▼12.79
Registered electors		26,895		▼3.01
INC hold		Swing	▼5.23	

=== Assembly Election 1967 ===
1967 Himachal Pradesh Legislative Assembly election: Nagrota
Party	Candidate	Votes	%	±%
INC	Hardyal	8,433	57.69%	New
ABJS	S. Parkash	3,937	26.93%	New
Independent	G. Chand	2,247	15.37%	New
Margin of victory		4,496	30.76%	
Turnout		14,617	57.76%	
Registered electors		27,729		
INC win (new seat)				

== See also ==
- Nagrota Bagwan
- Nagrota Surian
- Kangra district
- List of constituencies of Himachal Pradesh Legislative Assembly
