= Harbans Singh Rana =

Indian politician

Harbans Singh Rana is an Indian politician and member of the Bharatiya Janata Party. Rana was a member of the Himachal Pradesh Legislative Assembly from the Guler constituency in Kangra district.
