= Jawalamukhi Assembly constituency =

Legislative Assembly constituency in Himachal Pradesh State, India

Coordinates: 31.87°N 76.32°E

Jawalamukhi
- Constituency No. 12 for the Himachal Pradesh Legislative Assembly

Constituency details
- Country: India
- Region: North India
- State: Himachal Pradesh
- District: Kangra
- Lok Sabha constituency: Kangra
- Established: 1972
- Total electors: 80,141
- Reservation: None

Member of Legislative Assembly
- 14th Himachal Pradesh Legislative Assembly
- Incumbent Sanjay Rattan
- Party: Indian National Congress
- Elected year: 2022

Jawalamukhi Assembly constituency is one of the 68 constituencies in the Himachal Pradesh Legislative Assembly of Himachal Pradesh a northern state of India. Jawalamukhi is also part of Kangra Lok Sabha constituency.

== Members of Legislative Assembly ==
Year	Member	Picture	Party
1972	Mela Ram		Independent
1977	Kashmir Singh Rana		Janata Party
1982	Kashmir Singh Rana		Bharatiya Janata Party
1985	Ishwar Chand		Independent
1990	Dhani Ram		Bharatiya Janata Party
1993	Kewal Singh		Indian National Congress
1998	Ramesh Chand Dhawala		Independent
2003	Ramesh Chand Dhawala		Bharatiya Janata Party
2007	Ramesh Chand Dhawala		Bharatiya Janata Party
2012	Sanjay Rattan		Indian National Congress
2017	Ramesh Chand Dhawala		Bharatiya Janata Party
2022	Sanjay Rattan		Indian National Congress

== Election results ==
=== Assembly Election 2022 ===
2022 Himachal Pradesh Legislative Assembly election: Jawalamukhi
Party	Candidate	Votes	%	±%
INC	Sanjay Rattan	27,827	46.48%	▲7.13
BJP	Ravinder Singh Ravi	21,423	35.78%	▼15.43
Independent	Atul Kaushal	9,511	15.89%	New
AAP	Hoshiar Singh	616	1.03%	New
NOTA	Nota	201	0.34%	▼0.43
BSP	Sushil Kumar	201	0.34%	New
Independent	Sunil Kumar	93	0.16%	New
Margin of victory		6,404	10.70%	▼1.16
Turnout		59,872	74.71%	▼0.70
Registered electors		80,141		▲10.86
INC gain from BJP		Swing	▼4.73	

=== Assembly Election 2017 ===
2017 Himachal Pradesh Legislative Assembly election: Jawalamukhi
Party	Candidate	Votes	%	±%
BJP	Ramesh Chand	27,914	51.21%	▲6.61
INC	Sanjay Rattan	21,450	39.35%	▼13.84
Independent	Vijender Kumar (Chhunku)	3,529	6.47%	New
NOTA	None of the Above	419	0.77%	New
Independent	Pratap Singh	387	0.71%	New
Margin of victory		6,464	11.86%	▲3.27
Turnout		54,512	75.41%	▲3.82
Registered electors		72,292		▲10.41
BJP gain from INC		Swing	▼1.98	

=== Assembly Election 2012 ===
2012 Himachal Pradesh Legislative Assembly election: Jawalamukhi
Party	Candidate	Votes	%	±%
INC	Sanjay Rattan	24,929	53.19%	▲43.66
BJP	Ramesh Chand	20,904	44.60%	▼3.81
AITC	Dr. Madhu Gupta	410	0.87%	New
BSP	Parkash Chand	332	0.71%	▼2.06
Independent	Mohinder Singh	255	0.54%	New
Margin of victory		4,025	8.59%	▼1.63
Turnout		46,871	71.59%	▲1.25
Registered electors		65,474		▼1.19
INC gain from BJP		Swing	▲4.78	

=== Assembly Election 2007 ===
2007 Himachal Pradesh Legislative Assembly election: Jawalamukhi
Party	Candidate	Votes	%	±%
BJP	Ramesh Chand	22,562	48.41%	▼1.90
Independent	Sanjay Rattan	17,798	38.19%	New
INC	Rooma Koundal	4,441	9.53%	▼7.91
BSP	Ramesh Chand Khoula	1,292	2.77%	▲1.62
LJP	Partap Singh Rana	433	0.93%	▲0.15
Margin of victory		4,764	10.22%	▼20.53
Turnout		46,606	70.34%	▼5.29
Registered electors		66,261		▲12.26
BJP hold		Swing	▼1.90	

=== Assembly Election 2003 ===
2003 Himachal Pradesh Legislative Assembly election: Jawalamukhi
Party	Candidate	Votes	%	±%
BJP	Ramesh Chand	22,459	50.31%	▲20.91
Independent	Sanjay Rattan	8,730	19.56%	New
INC	Kewal Singh Pathania	7,786	17.44%	▼12.27
HVC	Gulzar Mohammad	1,393	3.12%	▼3.59
Independent	Kushal Singh	1,254	2.81%	New
SP	Kishan Parmar	1,123	2.52%	New
BSP	Mohinder Kumar	515	1.15%	▼0.30
Independent	Vijay Kumar	508	1.14%	New
LJP	Piare Lal	346	0.78%	New
Independent	Karam Chand Kanga	343	0.77%	New
Margin of victory		13,729	30.75%	▲27.74
Turnout		44,643	75.63%	▲3.11
Registered electors		59,027		▲21.63
BJP gain from Independent		Swing	▲17.59	

=== Assembly Election 1998 ===
1998 Himachal Pradesh Legislative Assembly election: Jawalamukhi
Party	Candidate	Votes	%	±%
Independent	Ramesh Chand	11,517	32.72%	New
INC	Kewal Singh	10,456	29.71%	▼22.36
BJP	Kashmir Singh Rana	10,348	29.40%	▼13.27
HVC	Veena Devi	2,362	6.71%	New
BSP	Lal Chand	513	1.46%	▼0.11
Margin of victory		1,061	3.01%	▼6.38
Turnout		35,196	73.93%	▲2.12
Registered electors		48,530		▲7.43
Independent gain from INC		Swing	▼19.34	

=== Assembly Election 1993 ===
1993 Himachal Pradesh Legislative Assembly election: Jawalamukhi
Party	Candidate	Votes	%	±%
INC	Kewal Singh	16,558	52.07%	▲27.68
BJP	Dhani Ram	13,569	42.67%	▼23.72
BSP	Parkash Chand	499	1.57%	▲0.01
Independent	Kishan Parmar	438	1.38%	New
Independent	Rajesh Jamwal	405	1.27%	New
Margin of victory		2,989	9.40%	▼32.59
Turnout		31,802	70.89%	▲1.05
Registered electors		45,173		▲8.59
INC gain from BJP		Swing	▼14.32	

=== Assembly Election 1990 ===
1990 Himachal Pradesh Legislative Assembly election: Jawalamukhi
Party	Candidate	Votes	%	±%
BJP	Dhani Ram	19,152	66.38%	▲34.60
INC	Sushil Chand Rattan	7,037	24.39%	▼8.47
INS(SCS)	Ishwar Chand	1,341	4.65%	New
BSP	Rattan Chand	450	1.56%	New
Independent	Kishan Parmar	369	1.28%	New
Independent	Gian Chand	211	0.73%	New
Independent	Subhash Chand Dhiman	164	0.57%	New
Margin of victory		12,115	41.99%	▲41.95
Turnout		28,851	69.99%	▼5.86
Registered electors		41,600		▲27.89
BJP gain from Independent		Swing	▲33.48	

=== Assembly Election 1985 ===
1985 Himachal Pradesh Legislative Assembly election: Jawalamukhi
Party	Candidate	Votes	%	±%
Independent	Ishwar Chand	8,050	32.90%	New
INC	Sushil Chand Rattan	8,041	32.86%	▲0.43
BJP	Kashmir Singh Rana	7,776	31.78%	▼8.81
Independent	Parmodh Singh	473	1.93%	New
Independent	Lal Chand	127	0.52%	New
Margin of victory		9	0.04%	▼8.12
Turnout		24,467	75.89%	▼0.60
Registered electors		32,528		▲7.06
Independent gain from BJP		Swing	▼7.69	

=== Assembly Election 1982 ===
1982 Himachal Pradesh Legislative Assembly election: Jawalamukhi
Party	Candidate	Votes	%	±%
BJP	Kashmir Singh Rana	9,350	40.59%	New
INC	Mela Ram Saver	7,472	32.44%	New
Independent	Ishwar Chand	5,199	22.57%	New
Independent	Vijay Singh	379	1.65%	New
Independent	Kanshi Ram	313	1.36%	New
Margin of victory		1,878	8.15%	▼3.82
Turnout		23,035	76.99%	▲9.56
Registered electors		30,383		▲11.29
BJP gain from JP		Swing	▲1.94	

=== Assembly Election 1977 ===
1977 Himachal Pradesh Legislative Assembly election: Jawalamukhi
Party	Candidate	Votes	%	±%
JP	Kashmir Singh Rana	6,992	38.65%	New
Independent	Ishwar Chand	4,827	26.68%	New
Independent	Mela Ram Saver	4,778	26.41%	New
Independent	Kanshi Ram	556	3.07%	New
Independent	Ved Bhushan	501	2.77%	New
Independent	Jeet Ram	193	1.07%	New
Independent	Kashmir Singh	170	0.94%	New
Margin of victory		2,165	11.97%	▼17.49
Turnout		18,089	67.59%	▲1.80
Registered electors		27,300		▼4.92
JP gain from Independent		Swing	▼20.68	

=== Assembly Election 1972 ===
1972 Himachal Pradesh Legislative Assembly election: Jawalamukhi
Party	Candidate	Votes	%	±%
Independent	Mela Ram	10,981	59.33%	New
Independent	Ved Bhushan	5,529	29.87%	New
INC	Karam Chand Uppal	1,440	7.78%	New
Independent	Sant Ram	386	2.09%	New
Independent	Hari Kishan Lal	172	0.93%	New
Margin of victory		5,452	29.46%	
Turnout		18,508	66.41%	
Registered electors		28,713		
Independent win (new seat)				

== See also ==
- Jawalamukhi
- Kangra district
- List of constituencies of Himachal Pradesh Legislative Assembly
