= Nadaun Assembly constituency =

Legislative Assembly constituency in Himachal Pradesh State, India

Coordinates: 31.78°N 76.34°E

Nadaun
- Constituency No. 40 for the Himachal Pradesh Legislative Assembly

Constituency details
- Country: India
- Region: North India
- State: Himachal Pradesh
- District: Hamirpur
- Lok Sabha constituency: Hamirpur
- Established: 1967
- Total electors: 94,931
- Reservation: None

Member of Legislative Assembly
- 14th Himachal Pradesh Legislative Assembly
- Incumbent Sukhvinder Singh Sukhu; Chief Minister of Himachal Pradesh
- Party: INC
- Elected year: 2022

Nadaun Assembly constituency is one of the 68 assembly constituencies of Himachal Pradesh a state of northern India. It is also part of Hamirpur, Himachal Pradesh Lok Sabha constituency. Chief minister of state represents this constituency.

== Members of Legislative Assembly ==
Year	Member	Picture	Party
1967	Babu Ram		Indian National Congress
1972	Babu Ram		Indian National Congress
1977	Narain Chand Parashar		Indian National Congress
1982	Dhani Ram		Bharatiya Janata Party
1985	Prem Dass Pakhrolvi		Indian National Congress
1990	Narain Chand Parashar		Indian National Congress
1993	Narain Chand Parashar		Indian National Congress
1998	Babu Ram Mandial		Bharatiya Janata Party
2003	Sukhvinder Singh Sukhu		Indian National Congress
2007	Sukhvinder Singh Sukhu		Indian National Congress
2012	Vijay Agnihotri		Bharatiya Janata Party
2017	Sukhvinder Singh Sukhu		Indian National Congress
2022	Sukhvinder Singh Sukhu		Indian National Congress

== Election results ==
=== Assembly Election 2022 ===
2022 Himachal Pradesh Legislative Assembly election: Nadaun
Party	Candidate	Votes	%	±%
INC	Sukhvinder Singh Sukhu	36,142	50.88%	▲2.44
BJP	Vijay Agnihotri	32,779	46.14%	▲1.38
AAP	Shankey Thukral	1,487	2.09%	New
Margin of victory		3,363	4.73%	▲1.06
Turnout		71,039	74.83%	▲0.70
Registered electors		94,931		▲10.03
INC hold		Swing	▲2.44	

=== Assembly Election 2017 ===
2017 Himachal Pradesh Legislative Assembly election: Nadaun
Party	Candidate	Votes	%	±%
INC	Sukhvinder Singh Sukhu	30,980	48.44%	▲5.38
BJP	Vijay Agnihotri	28,631	44.76%	▼10.12
Independent	Lekh Raj Lekha	1,875	2.93%	New
Independent	Prithi Chand	364	0.57%	New
BSP	Ravi Parkash	339	0.53%	New
Margin of victory		2,349	3.67%	▼8.16
Turnout		63,959	74.13%	▲3.26
Registered electors		86,279		▲7.20
INC gain from BJP		Swing	▼6.45	

=== Assembly Election 2012 ===
2012 Himachal Pradesh Legislative Assembly election: Nadaun
Party	Candidate	Votes	%	±%
BJP	Vijay Agnihotri	31,305	54.89%	▲17.60
INC	Sukhvinder Singh Sukhu	24,555	43.05%	▲4.49
HLC	Babu Ram Mandial	1,090	1.91%	New
Margin of victory		6,750	11.83%	▲10.56
Turnout		57,035	70.87%	▲0.58
Registered electors		80,482		▲23.08
BJP gain from INC		Swing		

=== Assembly Election 2007 ===
2007 Himachal Pradesh Legislative Assembly election: Nadaun
Party	Candidate	Votes	%	±%
INC	Sukhvinder Singh Sukhu	17,727	38.57%	▲4.72
BJP	Vijay Agnihotri	17,141	37.29%	▲16.92
BSP	Prabhat Chaudhary	10,401	22.63%	New
LJP	Satish Thakur	296	0.64%	▼0.88
Independent	Vijay Kumar	252	0.55%	New
Margin of victory		586	1.27%	▼9.52
Turnout		45,964	70.29%	▼2.93
Registered electors		65,391		▲12.70
INC hold		Swing	▲4.72	

=== Assembly Election 2003 ===
2003 Himachal Pradesh Legislative Assembly election: Nadaun
Party	Candidate	Votes	%	±%
INC	Sukhvinder Singh Sukhu	14,379	33.84%	▼13.31
Independent	Prabhat Chand	9,794	23.05%	New
BJP	Babu Ram	8,657	20.38%	▼28.45
Independent	Thakur Raghubir Singh	8,313	19.57%	New
LJP	Virender	647	1.52%	New
HVC	Kavishka	437	1.03%	▼1.25
Independent	Prithi Chand	259	0.61%	New
Margin of victory		4,585	10.79%	▲9.12
Turnout		42,486	73.37%	▲4.88
Registered electors		58,023		▲14.45
INC gain from BJP		Swing	▼14.98	

=== Assembly Election 1998 ===
1998 Himachal Pradesh Legislative Assembly election: Nadaun
Party	Candidate	Votes	%	±%
BJP	Babu Ram Mandial	16,917	48.83%	▲2.46
INC	Narain Chand Parashar	16,337	47.15%	▼2.61
HVC	Prem Dass Pakhrolvi	790	2.28%	New
BSP	Saroj Kumari	432	1.25%	▲0.47
Margin of victory		580	1.67%	▼1.73
Turnout		34,648	69.12%	▲1.70
Registered electors		50,696		▲7.97
BJP gain from INC		Swing	▼0.94	

=== Assembly Election 1993 ===
1993 Himachal Pradesh Legislative Assembly election: Nadaun
Party	Candidate	Votes	%	±%
INC	Narain Chand Parashar	15,571	49.77%	▲6.03
BJP	Raghubir Singh	14,506	46.36%	New
Independent	Atam Parkash	540	1.73%	New
BSP	Puran Chand	244	0.78%	New
Margin of victory		1,065	3.40%	▼4.98
Turnout		31,289	67.06%	▲0.92
Registered electors		46,952		▲10.64
INC hold		Swing	▲6.03	

=== Assembly Election 1990 ===
1990 Himachal Pradesh Legislative Assembly election: Nadaun
Party	Candidate	Votes	%	±%
INC	Narain Chand Parashar	12,198	43.74%	▼15.47
JD	Babu Ram Mandial	9,860	35.35%	New
Independent	Raghubir Singh	5,096	18.27%	New
Doordarshi Party	Anil Kumar Prashar	226	0.81%	New
Independent	Hari Kishan Sharma	157	0.56%	New
Margin of victory		2,338	8.38%	▼11.41
Turnout		27,889	66.39%	▼0.74
Registered electors		42,435		▲30.57
INC hold		Swing	▼15.47	

=== Assembly Election 1985 ===
1985 Himachal Pradesh Legislative Assembly election: Nadaun
Party	Candidate	Votes	%	±%
INC	Prem Dass Pakhrolvi	12,788	59.21%	▲23.05
BJP	Dhani Ram	8,512	39.41%	▼5.60
Independent	Prem Chand	298	1.38%	New
Margin of victory		4,276	19.80%	▲10.95
Turnout		21,598	67.05%	▲0.54
Registered electors		32,499		▲3.58
INC gain from BJP		Swing		

=== Assembly Election 1982 ===
1982 Himachal Pradesh Legislative Assembly election: Nadaun
Party	Candidate	Votes	%	±%
BJP	Dhani Ram	9,308	45.01%	New
INC	Prem Dass Sharma	7,478	36.16%	▼9.39
Independent	Madan Lal Rattan	2,272	10.99%	New
Independent	Chuni Lal Choudhary	728	3.52%	New
JP	Gurdhian Singh	406	1.96%	▼31.80
Independent	Chander Bhan Choudhary	263	1.27%	New
LKD	Jagat Ram	175	0.85%	New
Margin of victory		1,830	8.85%	▼2.94
Turnout		20,681	66.73%	▲1.04
Registered electors		31,375		▲10.89
BJP gain from INC		Swing	▼0.54	

=== Assembly Election 1977 ===
1977 Himachal Pradesh Legislative Assembly election: Nadaun
Party	Candidate	Votes	%	±%
INC	Narain Chand Parashar	8,361	45.55%	▼2.18
JP	Prem Singh	6,197	33.76%	New
Independent	Mandal Lal	2,798	15.24%	New
Independent	Babu Ram	688	3.75%	New
Independent	Ramesh Chand	172	0.94%	New
Independent	Kishori Lal	141	0.77%	New
Margin of victory		2,164	11.79%	▲1.33
Turnout		18,357	65.80%	▲6.68
Registered electors		28,294		▲5.85
INC hold		Swing	▼2.18	

=== Assembly Election 1972 ===
1972 Himachal Pradesh Legislative Assembly election: Nadaun
Party	Candidate	Votes	%	±%
INC	Babu Ram	7,424	47.72%	▲22.67
Independent	Gurdhian Singh	5,797	37.27%	New
Independent	Durga Singh	1,802	11.58%	New
Independent	Madan Singh	533	3.43%	New
Margin of victory		1,627	10.46%	▲1.70
Turnout		15,556	59.58%	▲8.09
Registered electors		26,730		▲2.69
INC gain from Independent		Swing	▲13.92	

=== Assembly Election 1967 ===
1967 Himachal Pradesh Legislative Assembly election: Nadaun
Party	Candidate	Votes	%	±%
Independent	B. Ram	4,409	33.81%	New
INC	M. Singh	3,267	25.05%	New
ABJS	A. Ram	3,143	24.10%	New
Independent	R. Lal	1,836	14.08%	New
Independent	C. Parkash	387	2.97%	New
Margin of victory		1,142	8.76%	
Turnout		13,042	54.15%	
Registered electors		26,031		
Independent win (new seat)				

== See also ==
- Nadaun
- Hamirpur district, Himachal Pradesh
- Hamirpur, Himachal Pradesh Lok Sabha constituency
