= Raghubir Singh Bali =

Indian politician

RS Bali
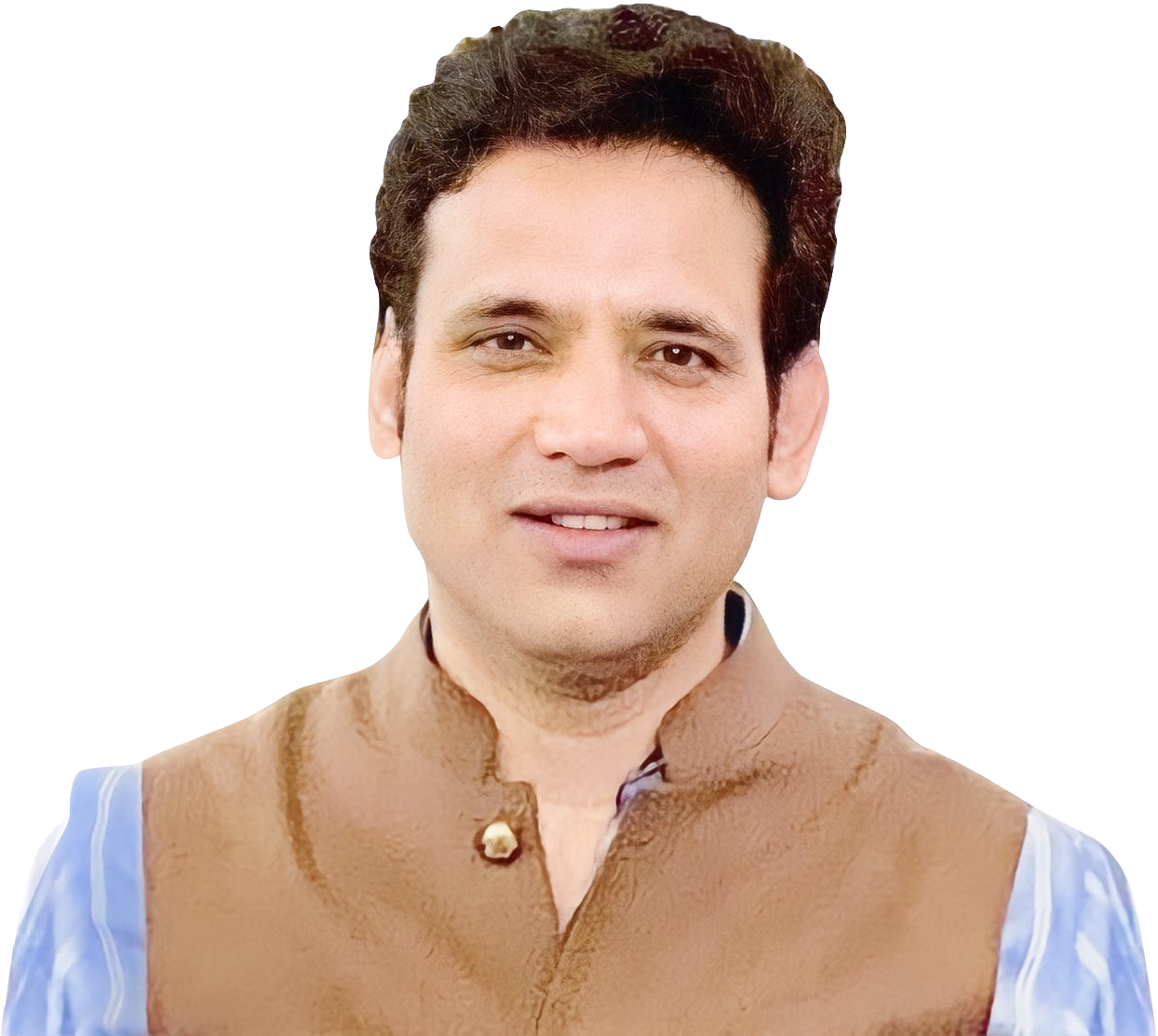
- Official portrait of RS Bali, 2023

Member of the Himachal Pradesh Legislative Assembly
- Incumbent
- Assumed office 8 December 2022
- Preceded by: Arun Kumar
- Constituency: Nagrota

Personal details
- Born: 31 March 1979 (age 47) Nagrota Bagwan
- Party: Indian National Congress
- Parent: G. S. Bali (father)
- Education: Ramaiah College, Bangalore
- Portfolio: Vice Chairman Tourism Department

RS Bali (born 31 March 1979) is an Indian politician, who currently serves as the MLA of Nagrota, in 2022 Himachal Pradesh Legislative Assembly election.

== Early life and education ==
Raghubir Singh Bali was born on 31 March 1979. He is the son of former Minister G. S. Bali, who was former chairman of Himachal Pradesh Tourism Development Corporation and the vice-chairman of the Himachal Pradesh Tourism Development Board.

After completing his education from Dalhousie Public School and DAV School, Kangra, he moved to Bangalore and did Bachelors in Hotel Management from Ramaiah College.

== Political career ==
Bali won 2022 Himachal Pradesh Legislative Assembly election by 15,892 votes.

During the 2020 Assembly elections, RS Bali was made the Co-Incharge of West Bengal.

RS Bali held the post of General Secretary of Himachal Youth Congress from 2004 to 2009.
