= Chambi, Himachal Pradesh =

Chambi
- village
- Chambi
- Interactive map of Chambi
- Country: India
- State: Himachal Pradesh

Languages
  - Official: Hindi
- Time zone: UTC+5:30 (IST)
- Postal code: 176208
- Vehicle registration: HP-

Chambi is a small village in the Shimla district near Chaupal, Himachal Pradesh, India. The village is situated among the mountains. It does not have a post office or school and is very sparsely populated.

Chambi ground is a small place situated in the Kangra district opposite the town of Rait, Himachal Pradesh, with a few shops and a bus stop, located at 32.184948°N 76.217014°E.
