= Indora =

Town in Kangra district, Himachal Pradesh

- Town
- Location in Himachal Pradesh, India
- Coordinates: 32.134°N 75.689°E
- Country: India
- State: Himachal Pradesh
- District: Kangra

Area
  - Total: 298 km^{2} (115 sq mi)
- Elevation: 308 m (1,010 ft)

Population (2011)
  - Total: 81,226
  - Density: 273/km^{2} (706/sq mi)

Languages
  - Official: Hindi
  - Regional: Pahari; Punjabi
- Time zone: UTC+5:30 (IST)
- PIN: 176402
- Telephone code: 01893
- Vehicle registration: HP-97

Indora is a town that serves as a tehsil headquarter in the Kangra district at the borders of Himachal Pradesh, India along the dried Beas rivulet, to which Pathankot is a nearer city in plains of Punjab, while Nurpur, a town in Himachal, is farther in the hills. One can reach Indora by train up to Kandrori (KNDI) or Pathankot (PTX). Alternatively, the MDR 42 road passes through Indora connecting NH 44 with NH 503, nearest airport is Pathankot Airport (IATA: IXP, ICAO: VIPK).

== History ==
Indora was the last stop of Alexander's conquests at Hyphasis River (Beas), since, exhausted by years of campaigning, his army mutinied and returned. Apollo temple, most likely Kathgarh Shiv Temple at this point, was raised as the easternmost extent of Alexander's conquests.

In 1806 Malha Chand settled at South East of Nurpur kingdom, later Chaudhari Gurbhaj named it Indpur and Indora after his grand father Raja Indu Chand, a Katoch prince. In 1854 British Raj awarded Jagir of Indora to Tek Chand which was succeeded by his son Sunder Singh, who however, died soon afterwards in 1875 leaving his son Rai Bahadur Mallah Singh as successive Jagirdar, in 1929 Raghunath Singh became Jagirdar, in 1952 after the post of Jagirdar was abolished Captain Vikram Katoch in 1972 continued the legacy by becoming MLA. The heritage buildings of Govt. Senior Secondary School, Police Station, Primary Health Center, Veterinary at Indora belongs to the Jagirdari era.

== Demographics ==
Indora is the tehsil headquarter for 116 villages with 81226 residents administrated under 30 panchayats by Sub Divisional Magistrate located in Kangra district, Himachal Pradesh . Panchayats:- Beli Mahanta (1), Majra (16), Chhanni (17), Damtal (2), Reserve Jangal Damtal Serat (4) , Chochar (5), Mohtli (15), Sehtar (12), Surajpur Uperla (13), Surajpur Jhikla (14), Toki (18), Chak Naglian (25), Sheikhupura (26), Ban Attarian (28), Kandrori (27), Bari (24), Jindri (19), Malot (20), Chakban Malot (10), Balir Malot (11), Balir Lodhwan (7), Samun (8), Bhagnal (9), Balkhor (21), Kulara (22), Dah (23), Raja Khas (29), Jhagrara (30), Bhapoo (32)

Also, Indora town has 4534 residents in 1004 houses provided with water, sewerage and other civic amenities.

- Sex ratio is 909 females per 1000 males, lesser than state average of 970 female per 1000 males.
- Literacy rate of Indora city is 88.54% while state average is 82.80%.
- Average Sex Ratio is 950 while state average is 972.
- Child Sex Ratio is 727, while state average is 909.

== Temples ==
- Kathgarh Shiv Mandir As per legends hi:भरत (रामायण) Bharat of Ramayan is reputed to have established octagonal shaped 8 feet Shiva ling and another 6 feet hi:पार्वती Mata Parvati shivling, a unique styled Shiv temple in Indora.

== Establishments ==
- Arni University constructed in 120 acres and 25 Km from Pathankot, since 2009 offers 74 courses leading to diploma, graduation, post graduation and Ph.D by its School of Basic Science, Horticulture and Agriculture, School of Pharmacy & Paramedical Studies, School of Art & Humanities, School of Technology, School of Legal Studies through its Private University Certification.
- Government College Indora constructed in vernacular architecture (resembling Govt. College Shillai Sirmour) and 19 Km from Pathankot, since 1995 offers courses in Humanities, Science and Commerce through Himachal University, Govt. of H.P .
