= Harchakian =

- town /village
- Interactive map of Harchakian
- Country: India
- State: Himachal Pradesh
- District: Kangra
- Time zone: UTC+5:30 (IST)

Harchakian is a town and the main bazaar of the nearby areas and sub-tehsil located at the Kangra Valley, mainly Ranital-32-mile road are the major road of the town in Kangra district Himachal Pradesh.

It contains the office of the executive magistrate. The executive magistrate office serves the common public by giving various services like issuance of community certificates, bonafide certificates and all the matters related to the land.
