= Jaswan-Pragpur Assembly constituency =

Legislative Assembly constituency in Himachal Pradesh State, India

Coordinates: 31.82°N 76.21°E

Jaswan-Pragpur
- Constituency No. 11 for the Himachal Pradesh Legislative Assembly

Constituency details
- Country: India
- Region: North India
- State: Himachal Pradesh
- District: Kangra
- Lok Sabha constituency: Hamirpur
- Established: 2008
- Total electors: 79,856
- Reservation: None

Member of Legislative Assembly
- 14th Himachal Pradesh Legislative Assembly
- Incumbent Bikram Singh
- Party: Bharatiya Janata Party
- Elected year: 2022

Jaswan-Pragpur Assembly constituency is one of the 68 constituencies in the Himachal Pradesh Legislative Assembly of Himachal Pradesh a northern state of India. Jaswan and Pragpur is also part of Hamirpur, Himachal Pradesh Lok Sabha constituency.

== Members of the Legislative Assembly ==
Year	Member	Party
2012	Bikram Singh	Bharatiya Janata Party
2017	Bikram Singh	Bharatiya Janata Party
2022	Bikram Singh	Bharatiya Janata Party

== Election results ==
=== Assembly Election 2022 ===
2022 Himachal Pradesh Legislative Assembly election: Jaswan-Pragpur
Party	Candidate	Votes	%	±%
BJP	Bikram Singh	22,658	38.27%	▼7.31
INC	Surinder Singh Mankotia	20,869	35.25%	▼6.74
Independent	Sanjay Prashar	13,405	22.64%	New
Independent	Mukesh Kumar	1,658	2.80%	New
NOTA	Nota	259	0.44%	▼0.22
BSP	Prem Chand	189	0.32%	New
AAP	Sahil Chouhan	163	0.28%	New
Margin of victory		1,789	3.02%	▼0.58
Turnout		59,201	74.13%	▲3.52
Registered electors		79,856		▲9.01
BJP hold		Swing	▼7.31	

=== Assembly Election 2017 ===
2017 Himachal Pradesh Legislative Assembly election: Jaswan-Pragpur
Party	Candidate	Votes	%	±%
BJP	Bikram Singh	23,583	45.59%	▼1.28
INC	Surinder Singh Mankotia	21,721	41.99%	▲8.10
Independent	Hans Raj	4,075	7.88%	New
Independent	Gagan Deep Prashar	428	0.83%	New
Independent	Mujesh Kumar	395	0.76%	New
NOTA	None of the Above	342	0.66%	New
Margin of victory		1,862	3.60%	▼9.38
Turnout		51,731	70.62%	▲1.73
Registered electors		73,257		▲7.51
BJP hold		Swing	▼1.28	

=== Assembly Election 2012 ===
2012 Himachal Pradesh Legislative Assembly election: Jaswan-Pragpur
Party	Candidate	Votes	%	±%
BJP	Bikram Singh	22,000	46.87%	New
INC	Nikhil Rajour	15,907	33.89%	New
HLC	Naveen Dhiman	6,982	14.87%	New
Himachal Swabhiman Party	Dinesh Kumar	818	1.74%	New
AITC	Rajinder Kumar	391	0.83%	New
Independent	Om Prakash	381	0.81%	New
BSP	Rajinder Singh	307	0.65%	New
Margin of victory		6,093	12.98%	
Turnout		46,939	68.89%	
Registered electors		68,140		
BJP win (new seat)				

== See also ==
- Jaswan
- Pragpur
- Kangra district
- List of constituencies of Himachal Pradesh Legislative Assembly
