= Dhanotu, Kangra district =

Village in Himachal Pradesh, India

Dhanotu is a village in the Kangra district in the Indian state of Himachal Pradesh. It is 13 km from Dharamshala bus stand and 9 km from Dharamsala airport. Primarily known for growing rice, wheat, corn and lychee farms, it is the farm country of Dharamsala area. At any given time, it is 6 degrees Celsius warmer than Dharamsala.

== Climate ==
At 770m (2,525 ft) elevation, Dhanotu is located in the Kangra Valley, at the base of the Dhauladhar Mountains in the Lesser Himalayas. It is classified as a Himalayan Wet Temperate Biome, characterized by heavy rain fall and Sub-Tropical Broad-Leaved Hill Deciduous Forests.

It is a key habitat to flying fox and many species of migratory birds, including the sarus crane - the tallest flying bird in the world. The sarus crane can be seen from spring through fall in the marshes and river beds surrounding Dhanotu village.

Geologically, Dhanotu sits on non-conglomerated glacial out-wash, dropped by ancient glaciers which melted or washed down from high up in the Himalayan range.
