= Salig Ram (politician) =

Indian freedom fighter and politician (1909–1986)

Dr. Salig Ram
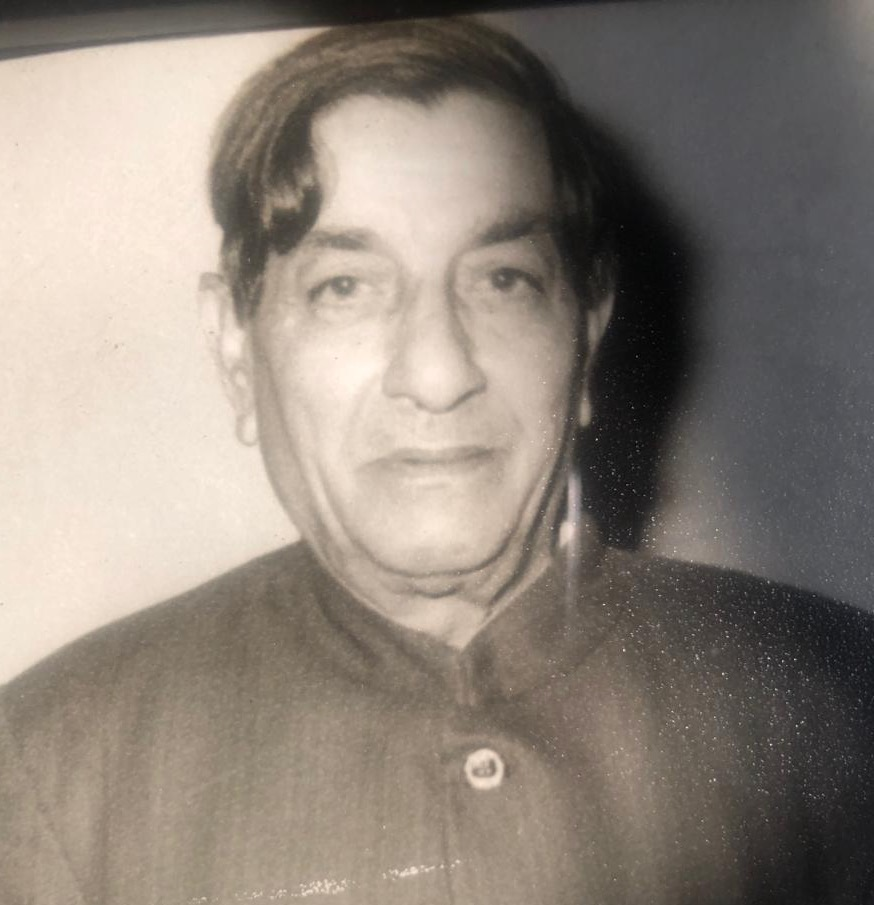

Member of Parliament in the Rajya Sabha, 1966-72 Minister in the Govt. of Himachal Pradesh, 1972-77 Minister in the Govt. of Himachal Pradesh, 28 January 1977 – 30 April 1977

Personal details
- Born: 15 August 1909 Ustehr village, Kangra district, Punjab, British India
- Died: 4 November 1986 (aged 77)
- Party: Indian National Congress
- Education: King Edward Medical School, Indore; D.A.V. College, Lahore; G.A.V. School, Kangra
- Occupation: Politician; Physician

Dr. Salig Ram (15 August 1909 – 4 November 1986; also written as Dr. Saligram) was a medical doctor, freedom fighter, and politician from Himachal Pradesh, India. He belonged to the Indian National Congress. Over 1966–72, he served as a Member of Parliament from Himachal Pradesh in the Rajya Sabha. Over 1972–77, he served as a Minister with various portfolios in the Government of Himachal Pradesh, principally under the Chief Ministership of Y.S. Parmar and later for a brief period under Thakur Ram Lal. He was known as a dissident of Y.S. Parmar.

== Personal life ==
Salig Ram was born in a Brahmin family to Purusottam Ram, at Ustehr in Kangra district, which was back then a part of the Punjab Province of British India. He was educated at the G.A.V. School in Kangra, the D.A.V. College in Lahore, and the King Edward Medical School, Indore. He was married twice, the second time to Vidya Devi. He had four sons and four daughters.

== Political career ==
=== Pre-Independence years ===
In 1922, Salig Ram participated in the Non-Cooperation Movement against British rule in India. His association with the Indian National Congress, which remained his political party throughout his later political career, started in 1937.

=== Early post-Independence years ===
Dr. Salig Ram was a member of the All India Congress Committee over 1948–51. He was active involved in the early efforts for enlarging the then emerging state of Himachal Pradesh, as the President of the District Congress Committee, Kangra.

=== Rajya Sabha ===
Dr. Salig Ram served as a member of the Rajya Sabha from Himachal Pradesh, from 3 April 1966 till 19 March 1972.

=== Himachal Pradesh Vidhan Sabha ===
Dr. Salig Ram was elected as a Member of Legislative Assembly (MLA) to the Himachal Pradesh Vidhan Sabha in 1972, from the Jaswan assembly constituency. He was made the Minister of Agriculture. In March 1973, he, along with another minister Sarla Sharma, failed to oust the then Chief Minister Y.S. Parmar. On the advice of the Chief Minister, Dr. Salig Ram was dismissed from his ministership by the Lt. Governor of Himachal Pradesh on 18 October 1973, under Article 164(1) of the Constitution of India. But he continued to be an MLA till early 1977.

After Y.S. Parmar resigned as Chief Minister on 24 January 1977, Thakur Ram Lal was sworn as Chief Minister on 28 January 1977, and on the same day Dr. Salig Ram was sworn in as Minister of Public Works. On 4 March, Dr. Salig Ram was additionally given the portfolios of multi-purpose projects, power, health and family planning, animal husbandry, fisheries, revenue, rehabilitation, food and supplies, elections, panchayats, housing and welfare. This government ended on 30 April 1977, followed by President's Rule for 53 days, and then the first Shanta Kumar ministry.

=== Others ===
- In 1960, Dr. Salig Ram was a member of the Punjab Pradesh Congress Committee, Kangra.
- In the 1960s, he served as the President of the District Congress Committee, Kangra.
- Over 1960–66, he served as the President of the Punjab PWD Worker's Union, Kangra.
- Over 1962–67, he served as the President of the Harijan Sevak Sangh, Kangra.
