= Dera Gopipur =

Dehra Gopipur
- Town
- Location in Himachal Pradesh, India Dehra Gopipur (India)
- Coordinates: 31.90°N 76.22°E
- Administrative Country: Dehra Gopipur India
- State: Himachal Pradesh
- District: Kangra

Government
  - Body: Municipal Council

Area
  - Total: 5 km^{2} (1.9 sq mi)
- Elevation: 503 m (1,650 ft)

Population (2011)
  - Total: 4,816
  - Density: 960/km^{2} (2,500/sq mi)

Languages
  - Official: Hindi
  - Native: Pahari
- Time zone: UTC+5:30 (IST)
- PIN: 177101
- Telephone code: 01970
- Vehicle registration: HP-36

Dehra Gopipur is a town, a Municipal Council, and a Tehsil headquarter in Kangra district in the state of Himachal Pradesh, India. The River Beas divides the town into Dera (or Dehra) & Gopipur. One can reach Dera by train up to Una (UHL) then by MDR 46 road and NH 503, nearest airports are Bhuntar Airport (IATA: UAA) and Gaggal Airport (IATA: DHM, ICAO: VIGG).

== History ==
The town of Dehra dates back to the mid-15th century when foreign invaders used this place as a dera (camp) for their expedition to hill states. The British made the evolving town as the tehsil in year 1868. The official name of the town during British Raj was Dera.

== Geography ==
Dehra Gopipur is located at 31.90°N 76.22°E. It has an average elevation of 503 metres (1,650 feet). The River Beas also flows past Dera. The Pong Reservoir (Maharana Pratap reservoir) is also a nearby major structure.

== Demographics ==
As of 2001 India census, Dehra Gopipur has a population of 4,336. Males constitute 52% of the population and females constitute 48%. Dehra Gopipur has an average literacy rate of 79%, higher than the national average of 59.5%. Male literacy is at 82% and female literacy is at 76%. In Dehra Gopipur, 11% of the population is under 6 years of age.

== Places of interest ==
The Bagulamukhi Temple, devoted to the goddess Bagulamukhi, was visited by Sh. Pranav Mukherjee.

=== Pong Dam ===
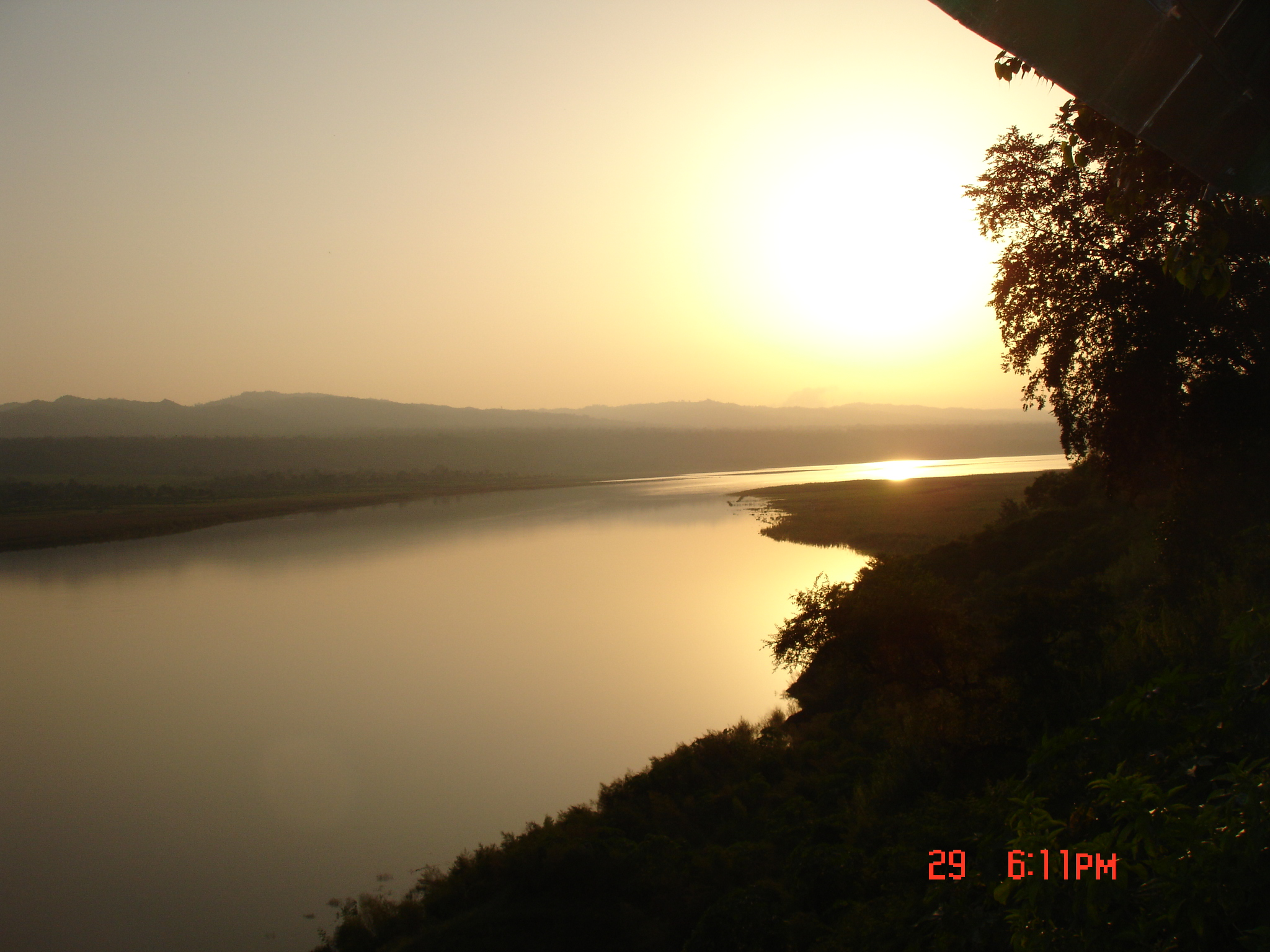
Dehra River Side

As the River Beas flows from the sub town it ends up in the Pong Dam reservoir/lake, also known as Maharana Pratap Sagar. This manmade lake is 45 km long & 15–18 km wide.

== Notable people ==
- Ramesh Chand Dhawala (born 1951), politician
