= Sulla (disambiguation) =

Sulla (Latin for "Little Calf") typically refers to the Roman politician, general, and dictator Lucius Cornelius Sulla Felix (138–78 BC), an important figure of the Late Republic.

It can also refer to:

- Other Cornelii Sullae, Sulla's relatives within the gens Cornelia
- Sulla, a genus of legumes
- Sulis, a Celtic goddess
- Sullah Upazila, a place in Bangladesh
