= Baba Kanshi Ram =

Indian poet and activist for independence

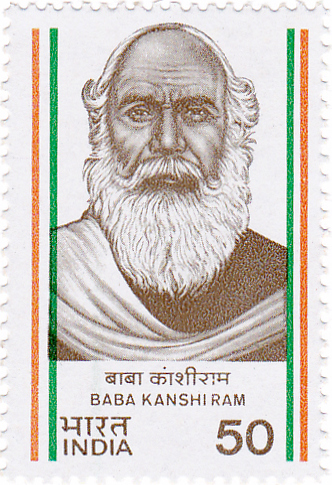
- Born: 11 July 1882; Dada Siba, Siba State, British Raj (now Kangra district)
- Died: 15 October 1943 (aged 61); Una, Himachal Pradesh, India
- Other name: Pahari Gandhi
- Organization: Indian National Congress
- Movement: Independence

Baba Kanshi Ram (11 July 1882 – 15 October 1943) was an Indian poet and activist for independence born in what is now the Indian state of Himachal Pradesh.

== Independence campaign ==
The death sentences handed out to Bhagat Singh, Rajguru and Sukhdev in 1931 had a great impact on him. He vowed to wear black clothes until India achieved its independence. He adhered to his vow until he died on 15 October 1943 and came to be known affectionately as the Siyahposh Jarnail (The Black General).

In 1937, Pandit Jawaharlal Nehru awarded him the title of Pahari Gandhi.
