= G. S. Bali =

Indian politician (1954–2021)

Cabinet Minister, Himachal Pradesh Government
- Constituency: Nagrota
- In office 2012–2017
- Preceded by: Kishan Kapoor
- Succeeded by: Kishan Kapoor
- In office 2003–2007
- Succeeded by: Kishan Kapoor

Personal details
- Born: 27 July 1954 Kangra, Kangra district, India
- Died: 30 October 2021 (aged 67) Delhi, India
- Party: Indian National Congress
- Children: Raghubir Singh Bali
- Occupation: Politician

Gurmukh Singh Bali (27 July 1954 – 30 October 2021) was a Member of the Legislative Assembly from Nagrota Bagwan, Himachal Pradesh, India. He was born on 27 July 1954 at Kangra. He had a Diploma in Mechanical Engineering. He got married on 20 June 1977. He was the Transport, Food, Civil Supplies & Consumer Affairs, and Technical Education Minister in Himachal Pradesh Cabinet.

He served as the Himachal Nagrik Sudhar Sabha's founding president. He served as the Himachal Social Bodies Federation's Vice Chairman and later its Chairman. From 1990 to 1997, he served as the Indian National Congress Vichar Manch's convener. He was the President of the Congress Seva Dal from 1995 to 1998. He was also the Joint Secretary of the Himachal Pradesh Congress Committee from 1993 to 1998.

He was elected to Himachal Pradesh Vidhan Sabha in 1998 and was re-elected in 2003, 2007 and 2012. He was appointed the Cabinet Minister for Transport on 6 March 2003. He lost to Arun Kumar from BJP in the 2017 Assembly elections.

== Death ==
He died at AIIMS Delhi on 30 October 2021 at the age of 67 due to post-operation complications of his kidney transplant.
