= Babu Ram Mandial =

Indian politician

Babu Ram Mandial is an Indian politician and member of the Bharatiya Janata Party. Mandial was a member of the Himachal Pradesh Legislative Assembly from the Nadaun constituency in Hamirpur district. Earlier, he had been a member of Indian National Congress. He was a lawyer who had graduated from Hoshiarpur. Babu Ram Mandial had risen from a poor household. He had a wife who was a professor mastered in Hindi and two sons: a dental surgeon and an orthopedic physician.
