= Sanjay Rattan =

Indian politician

Honourable Sanjay Rattan

Member of the Himachal Pradesh Legislative Assembly
- Incumbent
- Assumed office 8 December 2022
- Preceded by: Ramesh Chand Dhawala
- Constituency: Jawalamukhi
- In office 25 December 2012 – 18 December 2017
- Preceded by: Ramesh Chand Dhawala
- Succeeded by: Ramesh Chand Dhawala
- Constituency: Jawalamukhi

Personal details
- Born: 10 March 1963 (age 63) Garli, Kangra, Himachal Pradesh, India
- Party: Indian National Congress
- Profession: MLA

Sanjay Rattan (born 10 March 1963 at Garli, Dist. Kangra) is an Indian politician and serving MLA from Jawalamukhi. Rattan defeated BJP candidate Ravinder Singh in 2022 Himachal Pradesh Legislative Assembly election.
