= Sullah, Kangra district =

Village in India

Coordinates: 32°03′32.1″N 76°28′17.9″E

View of the Sullah railway station

Sulah is a village in Palampur tehsil in Kangra district of Himachal Pradesh State, India. It is located 13 kilometres (8.1 mi) from Palampur Town, 34 kilometres (21 mi) towards west from District headquarters Dharamsala. 180 kilometres (110 mi) from State capital Shimla. Sullah is famous for its natural sweet drinking water which locals claim to have medicinal properties.
