= K. N. Govindacharya =

Indian politician (bortn 1943)

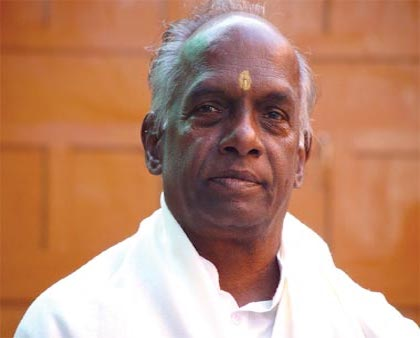
- K. N. Govindacharya

Personal details
- Born: 2 May 1943 (age 83) Tirupati, Madras Presidency, British India (present–day Andhra Pradesh, India)
- Party: Independent
- Other political affiliations: Bhartiya Janata Party
- Spouse: None
- Education: Banaras Hindu University
- Occupation: Social and political activist

Kodipakam Neelameghacharya Govindacharya (born 2 May 1943) is a founder Bharat Vikas Sangam, Kautilya International Foundation, Kautilya Shodh Sansthan, Rastriya Swabhiman Andolan and Forum for Ecocentric Development (Prakriti Kendrit Vikas Manch) Formally Rashtriya Swayamsevak Sangh pracharak, environmental activist, social activist, political activist and thinker. He was associated with Bharatiya Janata Party but is now a staunch critic of that party as much as he is a critic of the Indian National Congress.

== Political career ==
K. N. Govindacharya became a member of the Bhartiya Janata Party (BJP) in 1988 and for a period until 2000 he served as its General Secretary. He was forced to leave the BJP on the insistence of Prime Minister Vajpayee as he said Advani was calling the shots while the Prime Minister was just a mask. He insisted that the statement had been wrongly attributed to him, but Vajpayee, not impressed by the clarification, thought the damage to the party's image had been done, whether or not the quote was authentic.

In 2019, he filed a petition in Supreme Court seeking registration of FIR and NIA investigation against Facebook, WhatsApp and NSO Group for violating the privacy of Indian citizens. But he withdrew his petition, after CJI Sharad Arvind Bobde cited mistakes in the petition. In 2021, he again approached Supreme Court to revive his 2019 petition seeking court monitored investigation against Pegasus (spyware).

=== Sabbatical leave and after ===
Disturbed by growing instances of corruption in the Indian polity and corporate sector, and the police crackdown on followers of Ramdev on 5 June 2011, a group of former journalists, student activists, child rights activists and social workers encouraged Govindacharya to form a grand alliance of 50 small and large political organisations from across the country on 25 June, the day remembered for the declaration and imposition of Emergency, that year. He was elected chairman of the new alliance, known as the Save Democracy Front (SDF).

Under the patronage of Govindacharya, the third National Convention of Bharat Vikas Sangam was held in Kalburgi (Gulbarga), Karnataka, from 23 December 2010 to 1 January 2011.

K.N. Govindacharya is the chief patron of Eternal Hindu Foundation, who constantly works for the betterment of society. He was associated with social movements like JP Andolan, Ram Janma Bhumi Andolan, Bhartiya Sanskriti Utsav, Swadeshi Jagran Manch, etc. Govindacharya is also known for his environmental activism focused on eco-centric development. He is actively engaged in various social awareness initiatives like Shashwat Devalay, Sanatan Bhav Jagruti, ITIHASA & Shashwat Bharatam.

=== Himachal Swabhiman Party ===
The Himachal Swabhiman Party is a political party in the Indian state of Himachal Pradesh. The party was founded by former BJP ideologue Govindacharya on 10 August 2011. Subhash Sharma, a former leader of employees' movements in the state, was appointed as the president of the party.

Ahead of the 2012 Himachal Pradesh Legislative Assembly election, the party was assigned 'television' as its election symbol by the Election Commission of India. The party took part in discussions on the formation of a Third Front to contest the elections. The Himachal Swabhiman Party fielded 16 candidates in the 2012 assembly election. None was elected, together they mustered to get 6,571 votes (0.19% of the votes in the state).
