= Kangra district =

District in Himachal Pradesh, India

Kangra district Nagarkot, Trigarta
- District of Himachal Pradesh
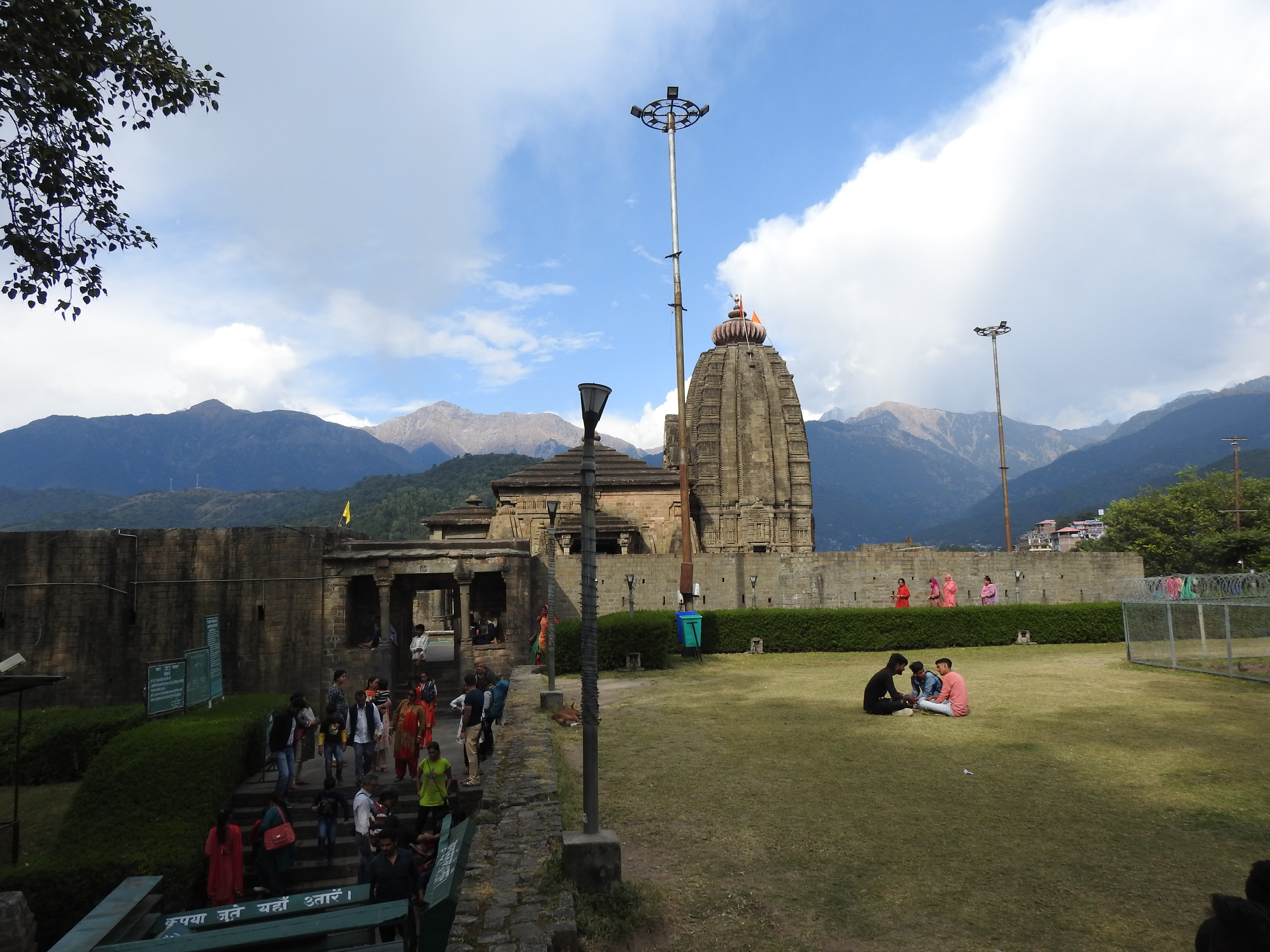
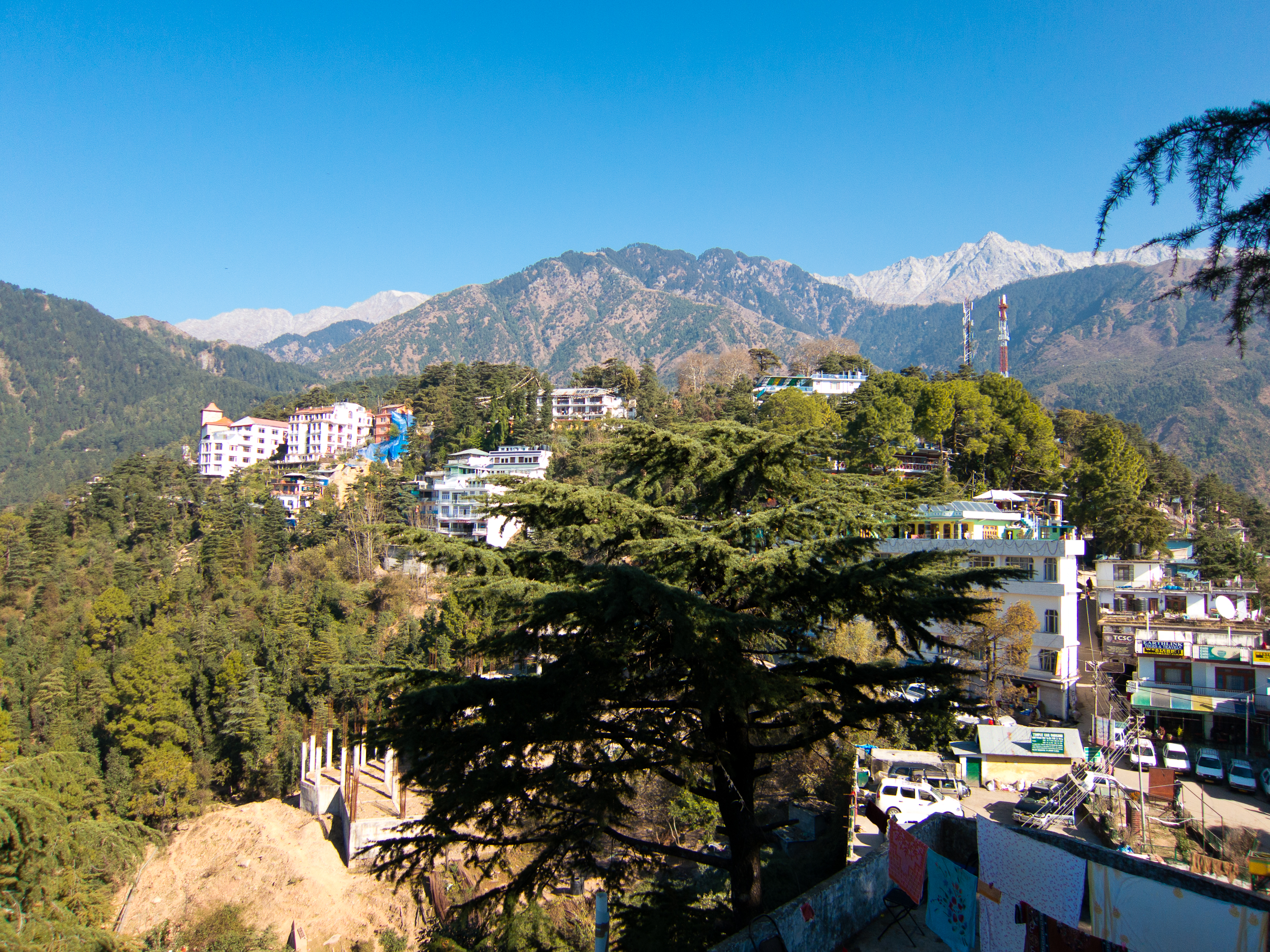
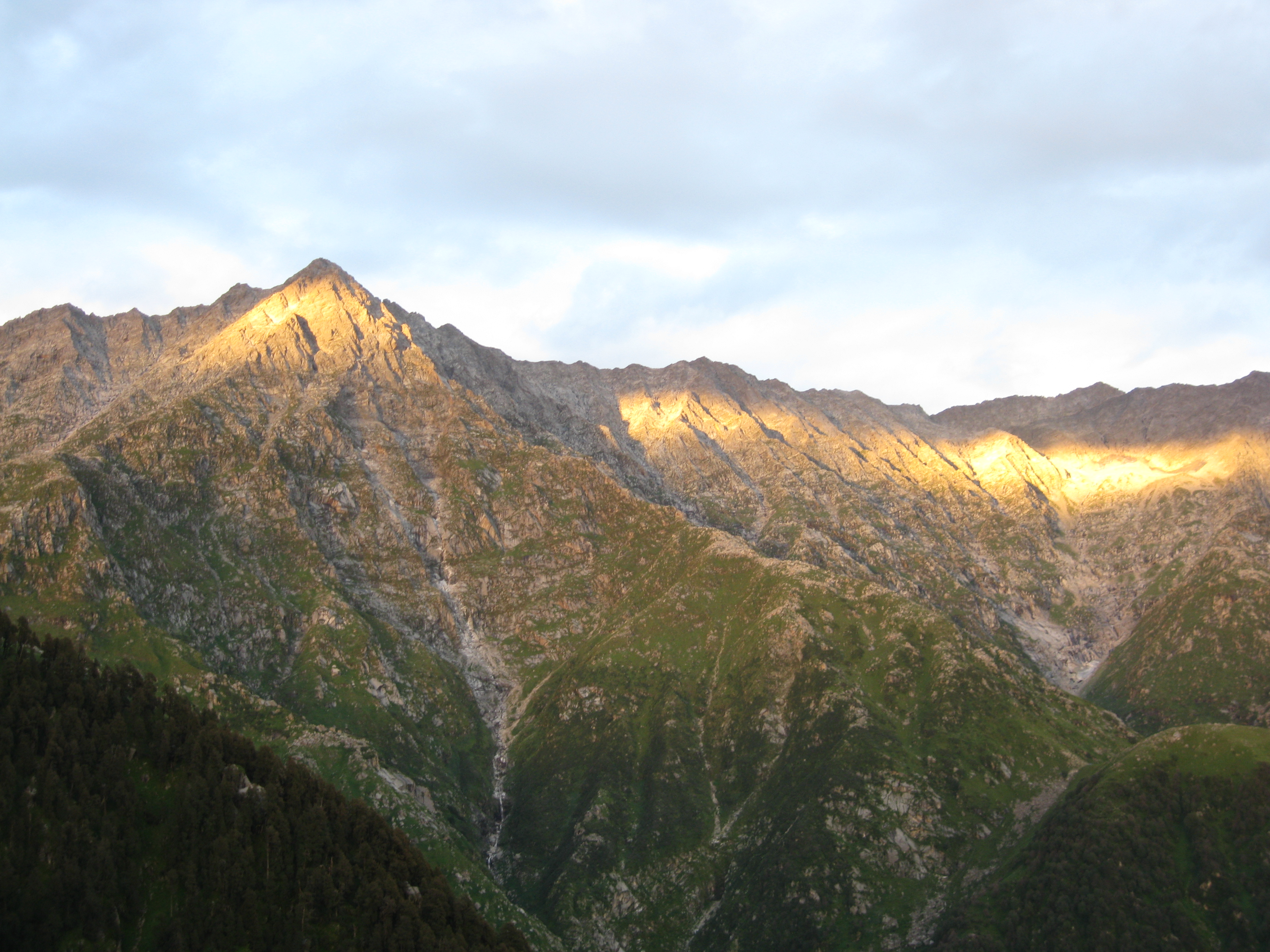
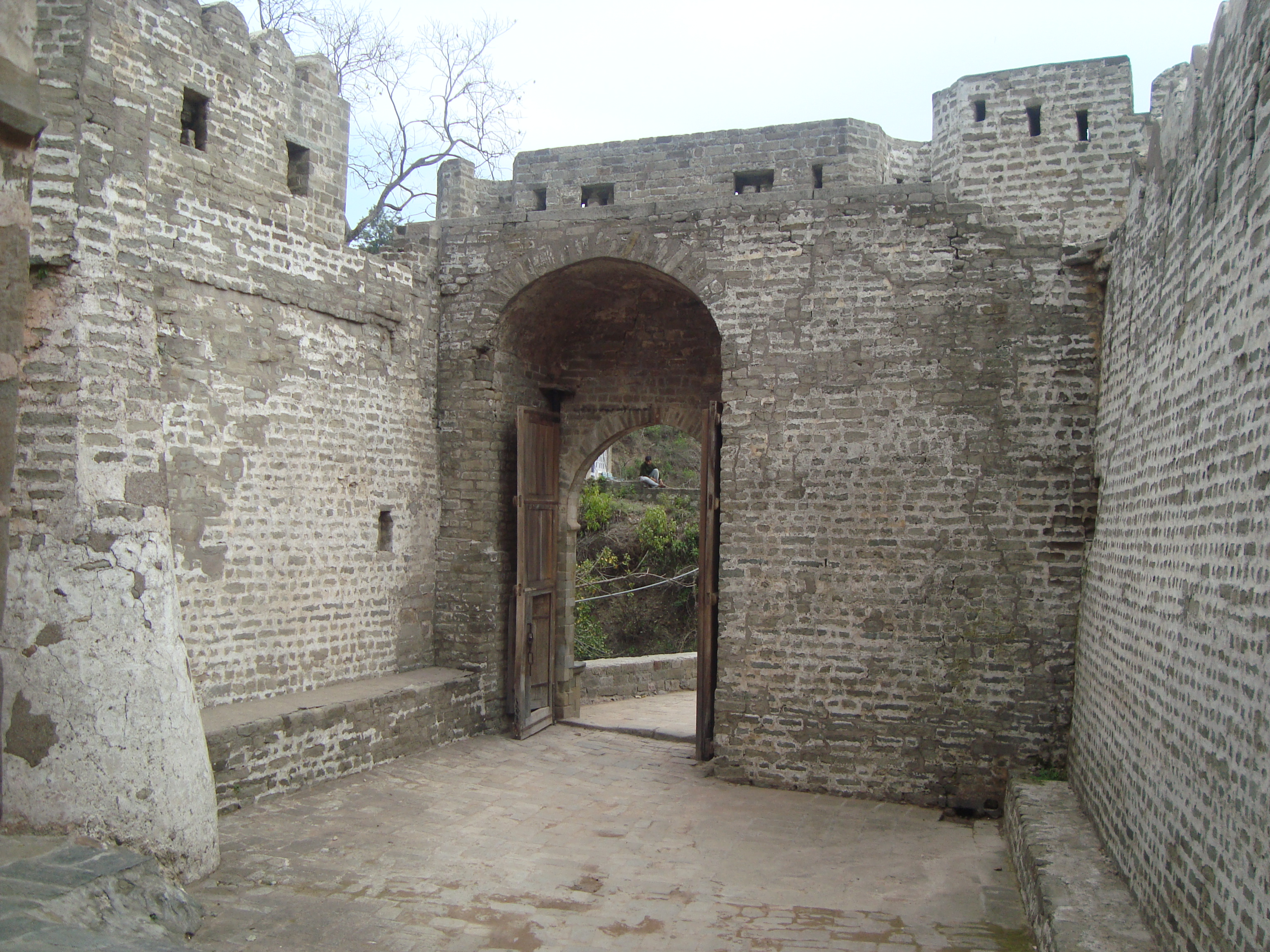
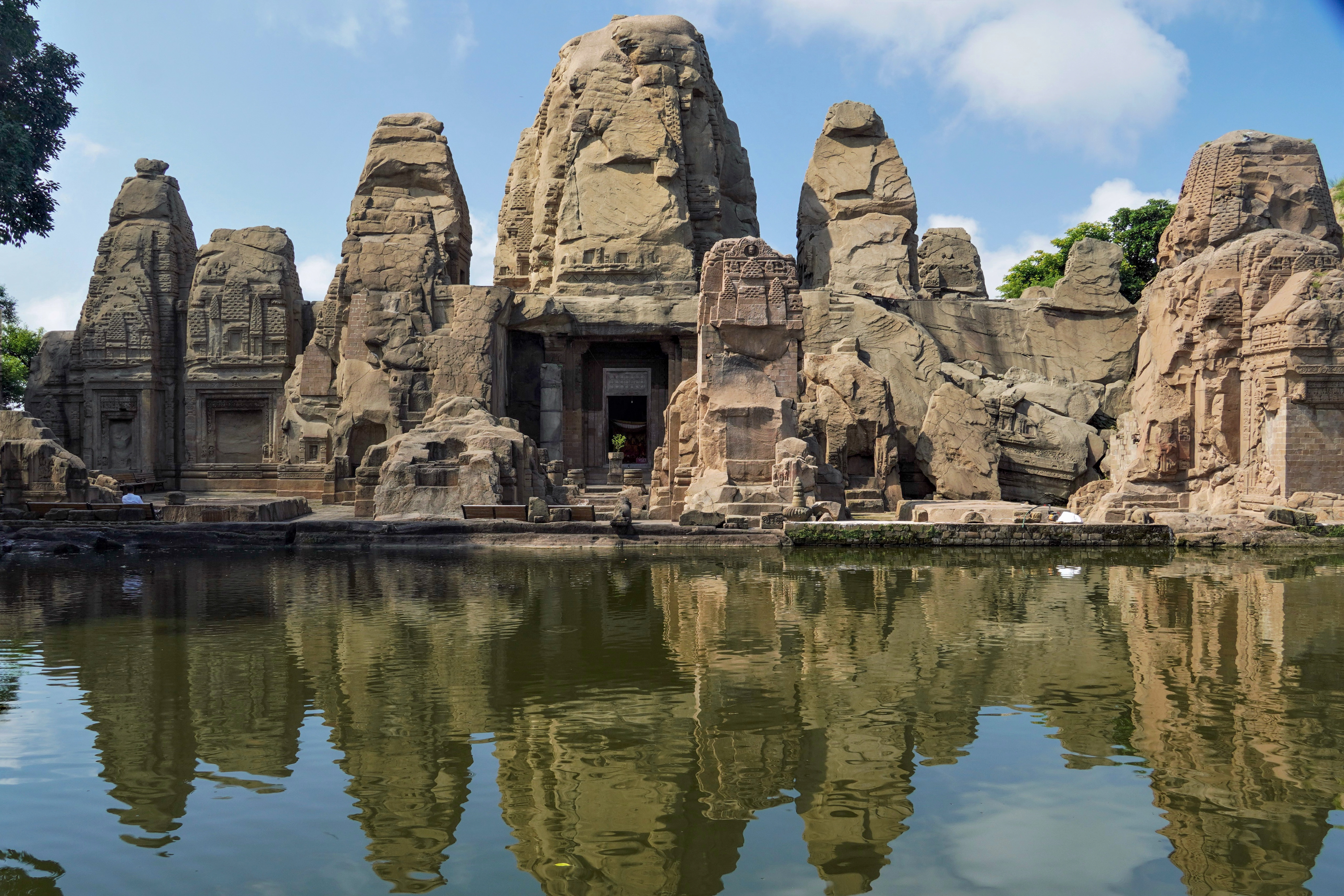
- Clockwise from top-left: Baijnath Shiva temple, McLeod Ganj from Dalai Lama temple, Ranjit Singh Gate, Kangra Fort, Masrur Temples, View of Dhauladhar Range from Triund

- Location in Himachal Pradesh
- Coordinates: 32°13′0″N 76°19′0″E
- Country: India
- State: Himachal Pradesh
- Division, Part of: Kangra
- Tehsils: Kangra; Nurpur; Jawali; Indora; Dehra; Shahpur; Baroh; Khundian; Jaswan; Rakkar; Fatehpur (Vidhan Sabha constituency); Baijnath; Jaisinghpur; Dharamshala; Palampur
- Headquarters: Dharamshala

Government
  - Lok Sabha Constituency, part of: Kangra: Nurpur; Indora; Fatehpur; Jawali; Jawalamukhi; Jaisinghpur; Sullah; Nagrota; Kangra; Shahpur; Dharamshala; Palampur; Baijnath; Hamirpur: Dehra; Jaswan-Pragpur
  - Member of Parliament, Lok Sabha: Rajeev Bhardwaj
  - Deputy Commissioner: Nipun jindal, IAS
  - Superintendent of Police: Vimukt Ranjan, IPS

Area
  - Total: 5,739 km^{2} (2,216 sq mi)
- Highest elevation (Hanuman Tibba): 5,930 m (19,460 ft)
- Lowest elevation: 500 m (1,600 ft)

Population (2011)
  - Total: 1,510,075
  - Density: 263/km^{2} (680/sq mi)

Languages
  - Official: Hindi
  - Regional: Kangri
- Time zone: UTC+5:30 (IST)
- Vehicle registration: HP- 68(RTO), 01/ 02D(Taxi)
- Largest city: Dharamshala
- Gender ratio: 1012 females/1000 males
- Literacy rate: 85.67%
- Vidhan Sabha Constituencies: 15: Nurpur; Indora (SC); Fatehpur; Jawali; Dehra; Jaswan-Pragpur; Jawalamukhi; Jaisinghpur (SC); Sullah; Nagrota; Kangra; Shahpur; Dharamshala; Palampur; Baijnath (SC)
- Climate: ETh (Köppen)
- Avg. summer temperature: 32 °C (90 °F)
- Avg. winter temperature: 20 °C (68 °F)
- Website: hpkangra.nic.in

Kangra district is the most populous district of Himachal Pradesh, India. Dharamshala is the administrative headquarters of the district.

== History ==
Kangra is known for having one of the oldest serving Royal Dynasty in the world, the Katoch of the Kangra State. In 1758, Raja Ghamand Chand was appointed nazim or governor of Jullundur Doab under the Afghans. Ghamand Chand was a brave and strong ruler who restored the prestige of Kangra. As he was unable to capture Kangra Fort, he built another fort at Tira Sujanpur on the left bank of the Beas, almost opposite to Alampur on a hill overlooking the town. He died in 1774 and was succeeded by his son, Tegh Chand, who died too soon in 1775. Ghamand Chand's grandson, Raja Sansar Chand (r. 1775–1823) established the supremacy of Kangra over all the surrounding hill states. During his reign, Kangra became a major centre for the arts and several palaces were built.

In 1805, the neighbouring hill states rebelled, with the aid of the Gurkha army. Raja Sansar Chand was forced to seek the help of Maharaja Ranjit Singh of the Sikh Empire. The Gurkha army was expelled but Ranjit Singh also annexed the most fertile part of the Kangra valley, reducing the Katochs of Kangra as well as the neighbouring rajas to the status of vassals. Kangra was annexed by Maharaja Ranjit Singh's Sikh Empire in 1810.

Kangra became a district of British India in 1846, when it was ceded to British India at the conclusion of the First Anglo-Sikh War. The British district included the present-day districts of Kangra, Hamirpur, Kullu, and Lahul and Spiti. Kangra District was part of the British province of Punjab. The administrative headquarters of the district were initially at Kangra, but were moved to Dharamshala in 1855.

=== In Jainism ===
Kangra was once an important center of Jainism. According to a local legend, King Suśarmācandra, after hearing the importance of Mount Shatrunjaya, took a vow to not eat or drink anything until he pays homage to Rishabhanatha at Palitana temples. Pleased by his devotion and to save him from starvation, demigoddess Ambika created a temple of Rishabhanatha at the king's fort. After paying homage to the idol, the king broke his fast.

Within the premises of Kangra Fort lies an idol of Rishabhanatha. The inscription on the pedestal of the idol is in Śāradā script. It mentions that the idol was consecrated by Śvetāmbara monk Amalacandra, a disciple of Ācārya Abhaycandra of the Rājakula Gachha in 854 CE. The granite idol of Rishabhanatha is seated in Padmāsana posture. An icon of bull carved on its pedestal indicates that the idol is of Rishabhanatha. However, another important trait of this idol is that it does not feature a waistband and a waistcloth, as most commonly found in Śvetāmbara icons of Tirthankaras after Bappabhattisuri's era. Locks of hair carved on both sides of the head of the idol as well as an inscription from 854 CE, however, make it clear that the idol and the temple is of the Śvetāmbara sect of Jainism as noted by archaeologist Sir John Marshall. Once a thriving Jaina center, it soon went unnoticed after migration of Jainas out of the town. The idol of Rishabhanatha was found in the Indreśvara Temple. Later on, efforts to reinstall the idol were made by Śvetāmbara Jaina nun Mrugavati, a disciple of Ācārya Vijayavallabhsuri. In 1978, the idol was installed in an independent shrine within Kangra Fort. Currently, the idol is under the care of the Archeological Survey of India, but Jainas are given the right to worship the idol.

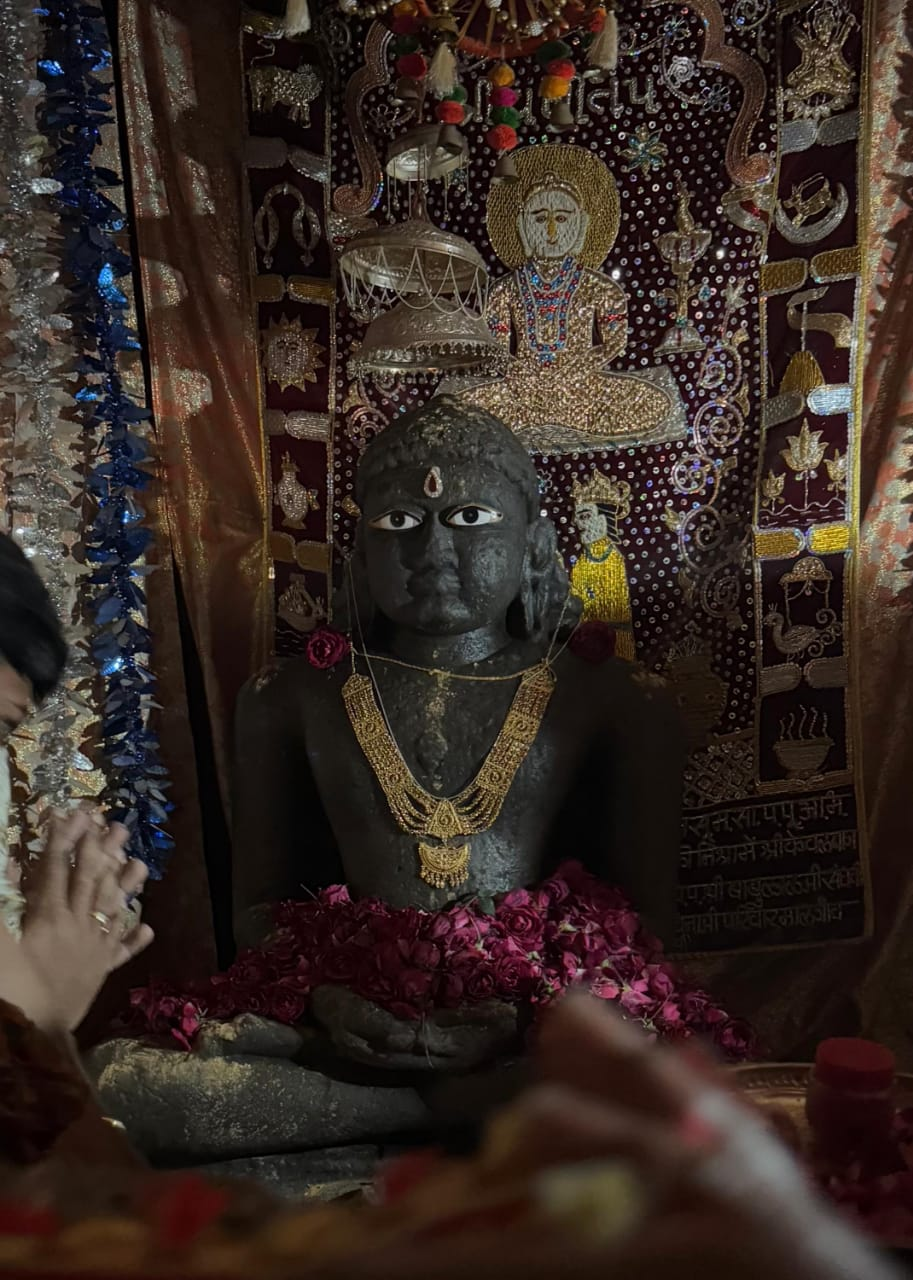
Idol of Rishabhanatha decorated with flowers and ornaments as per Śvetāmbara rituals

Dr. K. N. Sitaram, on his tour to Kangra Valley in 1930, discovered numerous remains of Jaina idols and temples. He also noted that several Jaina idols and temples were appropriated by the Hindus under different names of Hindu deities.

In 1916, Muni Jinavijaya published Vijnaptitriveni, which is a detailed report about the author's pilgrimage to Nagarkot and Kangra. It explains the journey of pilgrims from Faridpur to Nagarkot. It also highlights that the pilgrims return from Nagarkot to Faridpur through another route. It also describes a war between Yasoratha, a Khokhar chief and Sikandara, a Muslim ruler.

== Demographics ==
Historical population
Year	Pop.	±% p.a.
1901	478,364	—
1911	469,046	−0.20%
1921	469,251	+0.00%
1931	494,658	+0.53%
1941	563,163	+1.31%
1951	570,643	+0.13%
1961	657,232	+1.42%
1971	800,863	+2.00%
1981	990,758	+2.15%
1991	1,174,072	+1.71%
2001	1,339,030	+1.32%
2011	1,510,075	+1.21%

According to the 2011 census, Kangra district had a population of 1,510,075. The district has a population density of 263 inhabitants per square kilometre (680/sq mi). Its population growth rate over the decade 2001-2011 was 12.77%. 5.71% of the population lives in urban areas. Kangra district has a sex ratio of 1012 females per 1000 males and a literacy rate of 85.67%. Scheduled Castes and Scheduled Tribes made up 21.15% and 5.60% of the population respectively.

District highlights of 2011 Census

- Kangra district has the highest number of 3,869 villages among the 12 district of the state.
- Kangra district stands 1st position in terms of its working force having total workers of 675,170 persons against 3,559,422 working persons of the state.
- Kangra district occupies 1st rank among the districts of the state in terms of literate population. It has a literate population of 1,152,640 persons.
- The economy of Kangra district is mainly depends on agriculture. It has returned 303,007 persons as cultivators and holds the 2nd position among the districts of the state
- All the inhabited villages of the district enjoy the facility of electricity and potable drinking water.
- Kangra district is also known for its attractive tourist destinations. Dharamsala, Kangra, Palampur, Baijnath, Jawalamukhi and Masroor are the famous places of tourist interest in the district. McLeodganj in Dharamsala is a seat of the Dalai Lama has become a place of international fame since 1966.
- Central University of Himachal Pradesh at Dharamsala in Kangra district was established on 20 March 2009 under the Central University Act 2009(No.25 of 2009) of Indian Parliament.

The native people are the Kangri people and the native language is Kangri, which is very similar to Dogri. The majority of the people are Hindu, although many Tibetans and others who follow Buddhism have also settled here recently. There are also other minorities such as Sikhs, Muslims, and Christians.

Jhamakda is a folk dance of Kangra. It is exclusively performed by women. It features percussion instruments and songs.

=== Religion ===
Religions in Kangra district (2011)
Religion	Percent
Hinduism	96.76%
Islam	1.31%
Buddhism	0.96%
Sikhism	0.59%
Other or not stated	0.42%
Distribution of religions

Religion in Kangra District
Religious group	2011	
Religious group	Pop.	%
Hinduism	1,461,140	96.76%
Islam	19,797	1.31%
Buddhism	14,511	0.96%
Sikhism	8,929	0.59%
Christianity	3,023	0.2%
Jainism	194	0.01%
Others	2,481	0.16%
Total Population	1,510,075	100%

Religious groups in Kangra District (British Punjab province era)
Religious group	1881		1891		1901		1911		1921		1931		1941	
Religious group	Pop.	%	Pop.	%	Pop.	%	Pop.	%	Pop.	%	Pop.	%	Pop.	%
Hinduism (Note: 1931-1941: Including Ad-Dharmis)	687,635	94.09%	715,607	93.78%	722,554	94.07%	725,156	94.13%	722,277	94.28%	752,098	93.86%	846,531	94.12%
Islam	39,148	5.36%	39,709	5.2%	39,672	5.16%	38,859	5.04%	38,263	4.99%	40,483	5.05%	43,249	4.81%
Buddhism	2,860	0.39%	5,768	0.76%	4,176	0.54%	3,992	0.52%	3,019	0.39%	5,663	0.71%	8	0%
Sikhism	738	0.1%	1,461	0.19%	1,220	0.16%	1,910	0.25%	2,083	0.27%	2,396	0.3%	4,809	0.53%
Christianity	327	0.04%	343	0.04%	385	0.05%	386	0.05%	363	0.05%	576	0.07%	788	0.09%
Jainism	133	0.02%	140	0.02%	113	0.01%	81	0.01%	56	0.01%	94	0.01%	101	0.01%
Zoroastrianism	4	0%	2	0%	4	0%	2	0%	4	0%	2	0%	3,890	0.43%
Judaism	—N/a	—N/a	0	0%	0	0%	0	0%	0	0%	0	0%	0	0%
Others	0	0%	0	0%	0	0%	0	0%	0	0%	0	0%	1	0%
Total population	730,845	100%	763,030	100%	768,124	100%	770,386	100%	766,065	100%	801,312	100%	899,377	100%
Note: British Punjab province era district borders are not an exact match in the present-day due to various bifurcations to district borders — which since created new districts — throughout the historic Punjab Province region during the post-independence era that have taken into account population increases.

Religion in the Tehsils of Kangra District (1921)
Tehsil	Hinduism		Islam		Sikhism		Christianity		Jainism		Others (Note: Including Buddhism, Zoroastrianism, Judaism, Tribals, others, or not stated)		Total	
Tehsil	Pop.	%	Pop.	%	Pop.	%	Pop.	%	Pop.	%	Pop.	%	Pop.	%
Kangra Tehsil	110,804	93.61%	7,270	6.14%	192	0.16%	104	0.09%	0	0%	4	0%	118,374	100%
Dehra Tehsil	119,197	95.63%	4,787	3.84%	647	0.52%	7	0.01%	0	0%	0	0%	124,638	100%
Nurpur Tehsil	78,504	82.23%	16,540	17.32%	419	0.44%	7	0.01%	0	0%	0	0%	95,470	100%
Harimpur Tehsil	162,608	96.5%	5,504	3.27%	339	0.2%	0	0%	53	0.03%	0	0%	168,504	100%
Palampur Tehsil	133,456	97.38%	3,077	2.25%	441	0.32%	78	0.06%	0	0%	0	0%	137,052	100%
Kulu Tehsil	117,708	96.46%	1,085	0.89%	45	0.04%	167	0.14%	3	0%	3,019	2.47%	122,027	100%
Note: British Punjab province era tehsil borders are not an exact match in the present-day due to various bifurcations to tehsil borders — which since created new tehsils — throughout the historic Punjab Province region during the post-independence era that have taken into account population increases.

Religion in the Tehsils of Kangra District (1941)
Tehsil	Hinduism		Islam		Sikhism		Christianity		Jainism		Others (Note: Including Anglo-Indian Christians, British Christians, Buddhism, Zoroastrianism, Judaism, Tribals, others, or not stated)		Total	
Tehsil	Pop.	%	Pop.	%	Pop.	%	Pop.	%	Pop.	%	Pop.	%	Pop.	%
Kangra Tehsil	129,089	92.98%	8,574	6.18%	833	0.6%	214	0.15%	0	0%	130	0.09%	138,840	100%
Dehra Tehsil	141,009	95.64%	5,370	3.64%	1,035	0.7%	28	0.02%	0	0%	2	0%	147,444	100%
Nurpur Tehsil	83,565	80.12%	18,659	17.89%	2,067	1.98%	12	0.01%	0	0%	1	0%	104,304	100%
Harimpur Tehsil	194,801	96.76%	6,067	3.01%	362	0.18%	1	0%	97	0.05%	3	0%	201,331	100%
Palampur Tehsil	166,397	97.73%	3,207	1.88%	398	0.23%	231	0.14%	0	0%	23	0.01%	170,256	100%
Kulu Tehsil	131,670	95.97%	1,372	1%	114	0.08%	104	0.08%	4	0%	3,938	2.87%	137,202	100%
Note1: British Punjab province era tehsil borders are not an exact match in the present-day due to various bifurcations to tehsil borders — which since created new tehsils — throughout the historic Punjab Province region during the post-independence era that have taken into account population increases. Note2: Tehsil religious breakdown figures for Christianity only includes local Christians, labelled as "Indian Christians" on census. Does not include Anglo-Indian Christians or British Christians, who were classified under "Other" category.

=== Language ===
Languages of Kangra district (2011)
1. Kangri (70.9%)
2. Pahari (14.9%)
3. Hindi (5.55%)
4. Gaddi (2.64%)
5. Punjabi (2.06%)
6. Others (3.95%)

At the 2011 Census, 70.88% of the population in the district spoke Kangri, 14.92% Pahari, 5.55% Hindi, 2.64% Gaddi and 2.06% Punjabi as their first language.

== Politics ==
Constituency		Party	MLA	Remark
No.	Name	Party	MLA	Remark
6	Nurpur	BJP	Ranveer Singh	
7	Indora (SC)	INC	Malender Rajan	
8	Fatehpur	INC	Bhawani Singh Pathania	
9	Jawali	INC	Chander Kumar	Cabinet Minister
10	Dehra	IND	Hoshyar Singh	
11	Jaswan-Pragpur	BJP	Bikram Thakur	
12	Jawalamukhi	INC	Sanjay Rattan	
13	Jaisinghpur (SC)	INC	Yadvinder Goma	
14	Sullah	BJP	Vipin Singh Parmar	
15	Nagrota	INC	Raghubir Singh Bali	
16	Kangra	BJP	Pawan Kumar Kajal	
17	Shahpur	INC	Kewal Singh Pathania	
18	Dharamshala	BJP	Sudhir Sharma	
19	Palampur	INC	Ashish Butail	
20	Baijnath (SC)	INC	Kishori Lal	

== Wildlife Sanctuaries ==
=== Dhauladhar Wildlife Sanctuary ===
Dhauladhar Wildlife Sanctuary is located at an altitude of 1600 m going up to 4400 m, Dhauladhar Wildlife Sanctuary was established in 1994 by the Wildlife Department of Himachal Pradesh Government. It is situated in Kangra district. The wildlife sanctuary is covered by snow-clad mountains from three sides. The flora of Dhauladhar Wildlife Sanctuary includes deodar, rhododendron, oak, spruce, pine, and mixed conifers. This wildlife sanctuary is home to animals such as red fox, black bear, leopard sambar, Asiatic lion, angora rabbit, and deer. It covers an area of 982.86 sq.km.

=== Pong Dam Lake Wildlife Sanctuary ===
Pong Dam Lake Wildlife Sanctuary covers an areas of 207.95 sq. km. in Kangra district. It is spread through the submerged area between Pong Dam Terrace (Talwara) to the bridge on Beas River at Dehra. It was created in1975, by building the highest earthfill dam in India on the Beas River in the wetland zone of the Siwalik Hills.

== Education ==
- Chaudhary Sarwan Kumar Himachal Pradesh Krishi Vishvavidyalaya
- Central University of Himachal Pradesh
- College for Higher Tibetan Studies, Sarah
- Government College of Teacher Education Dharamshala
- Himachal Pradesh Board of School Education
- Institute of Himalayan Bioresource Technology, Palampur
- National Institute of Fashion Technology, Kangra

=== Schools ===
- Jawahar Navodaya Vidyalaya, Kangra
- Sherab Gatsel Lobling School

== Notable people ==
- G. S. Bali - Indian politician
- Captain Vikram Batra, PVC - Indian army officer, recipient of Param Vir Chakra
- Didi Contractor - architect
- Chandrarekha Dhadwal - writer
- Captain Saurabh Kalia - Indian Army
- The 14th Dalai Lama - spiritual and religious leader of Tibetan people
- Kishan Kapoor - Indian politician
- Major General Siri Kanth Korla, PVSM, DSO, MC - Indian Army officer
- Chander Kumar - Indian politician
- Shanta Kumar - Indian politician
- Major Somnath Sharma, PVC - Indian Army officer, recipient of Param Vir Chakra
- Anuj Sharma - Singer, second Indian Idol runner-up
- Shriya Sharma - Film actress
- Sobha Singh - painter
- Jemadar Lala, VC - British Indian Army soldier, Victoria Cross awardee
- Tenzin Palmo - Buddhist nun
- Shivya Pathania - Television actress
- Dr. Salig Ram - Rajya Sabha MP and two-term minister in the Himachal Pradesh government
- Harbans Singh Rana - politician
- Nora Richards - Irish playwright
- Sudhir Sharma - Indian politician
- General Vishwa Nath Sharma, PVSM, AVSM, ADC - 14th Chief of Army Staff, Indian Army
- Brigadier Sher Jung Thapa, MVC - Indian Army officer, recipient of Maha Vir Chakra, known as "Hero of Skardu"
- Gautam Chand Sharma 'Vyathit' - writer and folklorist

== See also ==
* Chambi, Himachal Pradesh
- Dhanotu
- Harchakian
- Nagrota Surian
- Kangra Valley
- Kangra Valley Railway
- Kangra Fort
- Kangra painting
- Rait, Himachal Pradesh
- Shamirpur
