= Palampur Assembly constituency =

Legislative Assembly constituency in Himachal Pradesh State, India

Coordinates: 32.12°N 76.54°E

Palampur
- Constituency No. 19 for the Himachal Pradesh Legislative Assembly

Constituency details
- Country: India
- Region: North India
- State: Himachal Pradesh
- District: Kangra
- Lok Sabha constituency: Kangra
- Established: 1967
- Total electors: 78,449
- Reservation: None

Member of Legislative Assembly
- 14th Himachal Pradesh Legislative Assembly
- Incumbent Ashish Butail
- Party: Indian National Congress
- Elected year: 2022

Palampur Assembly constituency is one of the 68 constituencies in the Himachal Pradesh Legislative Assembly of Himachal Pradesh a northern state of India. Palampur is also part of Kangra Lok Sabha constituency.

== Members of Legislative Assembly ==
Year	Member	Picture	Party
1967	Kunj Behari Lal Butail		Indian National Congress
1972	Kunj Behari Lal Butail		Indian National Congress
1977	Sarvan Kumar		Janata Party
1982	Sarvan Kumar		Bharatiya Janata Party
1985	Brij Behari Lal Butail		Indian National Congress
1990	Shanta Kumar		Bharatiya Janata Party
1993	Brij Behari Lal Butail		Indian National Congress
1998	Brij Behari Lal Butail		Indian National Congress
2003	Brij Behari Lal Butail		Indian National Congress
2007	Parveen Kumar		Bharatiya Janata Party
2012	Brij Behari Lal Butail		Indian National Congress
2017	Ashish Butail		Indian National Congress
2022	Ashish Butail		Indian National Congress

== Election results ==
=== Assembly Election 2022 ===
2022 Himachal Pradesh Legislative Assembly election: Palampur
Party	Candidate	Votes	%	±%
INC	Ashish Butail	30,874	53.72%	▲6.54
BJP	Trilok Kapoor	25,546	44.45%	▲5.68
AAP	Sanjay Bhardwaj	430	0.75%	New
NOTA	Nota	382	0.66%	▼0.18
BSP	Suresh Kumar	244	0.42%	New
Margin of victory		5,328	9.27%	▲0.86
Turnout		57,476	73.27%	▼0.37
Registered electors		78,449		▲12.38
INC hold		Swing	▲6.54	

=== Assembly Election 2017 ===
2017 Himachal Pradesh Legislative Assembly election: Palampur
Party	Candidate	Votes	%	±%
INC	Ashish Butail	24,252	47.18%	▼2.81
BJP	Indu Goswami	19,928	38.77%	▲8.12
Independent	Parveen Kumar	3,198	6.22%	New
Independent	Baini Parshad	1,760	3.42%	New
NOTA	None of the Above	435	0.85%	New
CPI(M)	Lekh Raj	390	0.76%	New
Independent	Suresh Kumar	263	0.51%	New
Margin of victory		4,324	8.41%	▼10.92
Turnout		51,404	73.64%	▲0.90
Registered electors		69,809		▲8.74
INC hold		Swing	▼2.81	

=== Assembly Election 2012 ===
2012 Himachal Pradesh Legislative Assembly election: Palampur
Party	Candidate	Votes	%	±%
INC	Brij Behari Lal Butail	23,341	49.99%	▲5.11
BJP	Parveen Kumar	14,312	30.65%	▼19.38
HLC	Dulo Ram	6,115	13.10%	New
AITC	Rajeev Jamwal	981	2.10%	New
Independent	Narinder Jamwal	491	1.05%	New
BSP	Ashok Kumar	446	0.96%	▼2.38
Independent	Dhani Ram	339	0.73%	New
Himachal Swabhiman Party	Rama Mahendra	338	0.72%	New
LJP	Sunil Kumar	234	0.50%	New
Margin of victory		9,029	19.34%	▲14.18
Turnout		46,696	72.74%	▲1.47
Registered electors		64,197		▼8.89
INC gain from BJP		Swing	▼0.04	

=== Assembly Election 2007 ===
2007 Himachal Pradesh Legislative Assembly election: Palampur
Party	Candidate	Votes	%	±%
BJP	Parveen Kumar	25,121	50.03%	▲12.24
INC	Brij Behari Lal Butail	22,533	44.87%	▼8.93
BSP	Vinod Kumar	1,676	3.34%	▲1.87
Independent	Dhani Ram	441	0.88%	New
Margin of victory		2,588	5.15%	▼10.86
Turnout		50,214	71.27%	▼3.64
Registered electors		70,460		▲16.70
BJP gain from INC		Swing	▼3.78	

=== Assembly Election 2003 ===
2003 Himachal Pradesh Legislative Assembly election: Palampur
Party	Candidate	Votes	%	±%
INC	Brij Behari Lal Butail	24,333	53.80%	▲5.52
BJP	Parveen Kumar	17,090	37.79%	▼8.42
Independent	Ramesh Bhau	734	1.62%	New
HVC	Gopal Chand	731	1.62%	▼0.27
BSP	Kamlesh Kumari	666	1.47%	▼0.85
LJP	Ajit Kumar	631	1.40%	New
NCP	Jagdish Ram	385	0.85%	New
SP	Sunita	296	0.65%	▲0.13
Independent	Kapoor Chand	264	0.58%	New
Margin of victory		7,243	16.02%	▲13.94
Turnout		45,225	74.92%	▲6.73
Registered electors		60,378		▲7.73
INC hold		Swing	▲5.52	

=== Assembly Election 1998 ===
1998 Himachal Pradesh Legislative Assembly election: Palampur
Party	Candidate	Votes	%	±%
INC	Brij Behari Lal Butail	18,450	48.28%	▼8.85
BJP	Shiv Kumar	17,658	46.21%	▲6.61
BSP	Mukesh Kumar	889	2.33%	▲1.80
HVC	Narinder Jamwal (Nini)	722	1.89%	New
JD	Sunder Lal	203	0.53%	New
SP	Chaudhary Man Singh	199	0.52%	New
Margin of victory		792	2.07%	▼15.46
Turnout		38,211	68.98%	▼7.97
Registered electors		56,048		▲14.96
INC hold		Swing	▼8.85	

=== Assembly Election 1993 ===
1993 Himachal Pradesh Legislative Assembly election: Palampur
Party	Candidate	Votes	%	±%
INC	Brij Behari Lal Butail	21,212	57.14%	▲18.08
BJP	Shiv Kumar	14,702	39.60%	▼18.79
CPI	Ramesh Chand	972	2.62%	New
BSP	Roshan Lal	197	0.53%	New
Margin of victory		6,510	17.53%	▼1.79
Turnout		37,126	76.75%	▲8.14
Registered electors		48,754		▲7.48
INC gain from BJP		Swing	▼1.25	

=== Assembly Election 1990 ===
1990 Himachal Pradesh Legislative Assembly election: Palampur
Party	Candidate	Votes	%	±%
BJP	Shanta Kumar	18,012	58.39%	▲18.71
INC	Brij Behari Lal Butail	12,050	39.06%	▼11.85
Independent	Jagir Chand Katoch	288	0.93%	New
Doordarshi Party	Jagdish Chand	234	0.76%	New
Margin of victory		5,962	19.33%	▲8.10
Turnout		30,850	68.69%	▲1.26
Registered electors		45,360		▲31.50
BJP gain from INC		Swing	▲7.48	

=== Assembly Election 1985 ===
1985 Himachal Pradesh Legislative Assembly election: Palampur
Party	Candidate	Votes	%	±%
INC	Brij Behari Lal Butail	11,722	50.91%	▲11.96
BJP	Sarwan Kumar	9,137	39.68%	▼7.02
Independent	Gulbir Singh	1,027	4.46%	New
CPI	Karam Chand	770	3.34%	▲0.48
Independent	Jagir Chand Katoch	267	1.16%	New
Margin of victory		2,585	11.23%	▲3.47
Turnout		23,027	68.27%	▼5.00
Registered electors		34,495		▲10.00
INC gain from BJP		Swing	▲4.20	

=== Assembly Election 1982 ===
1982 Himachal Pradesh Legislative Assembly election: Palampur
Party	Candidate	Votes	%	±%
BJP	Sarwan Kumar	10,508	46.70%	New
INC	Kunj Behari Lal Butail	8,762	38.94%	▼4.52
Independent	Mehar Chand	1,171	5.20%	New
LKD	Iqbal Singh Guleria	682	3.03%	New
CPI	Pritam Paharia	644	2.86%	New
Independent	Harbinder Singh	427	1.90%	New
Independent	Des Raj Chaudhari	233	1.04%	New
Margin of victory		1,746	7.76%	▼5.32
Turnout		22,500	72.80%	▲9.28
Registered electors		31,358		▲11.53
BJP gain from JP		Swing	▼9.84	

=== Assembly Election 1977 ===
1977 Himachal Pradesh Legislative Assembly election: Palampur
Party	Candidate	Votes	%	±%
JP	Sarwan Kumar	9,930	56.54%	New
INC	Bidhi Chand	7,633	43.46%	▼20.98
Margin of victory		2,297	13.08%	▼40.65
Turnout		17,563	63.19%	▲24.50
Registered electors		28,115		▲29.87
JP gain from INC		Swing	▼7.90	

=== Assembly Election 1972 ===
1972 Himachal Pradesh Legislative Assembly election: Palampur
Party	Candidate	Votes	%	±%
INC	Kunj Behari Lal Butail	5,296	64.44%	▲16.97
Independent	Bal Singh Guleria	880	10.71%	New
Independent	Bir Singh	777	9.45%	New
Independent	Devi Singh	720	8.76%	New
Independent	Thakur Dass	546	6.64%	New
Margin of victory		4,416	53.73%	▲46.00
Turnout		8,219	38.88%	▼16.56
Registered electors		21,648		▼0.72
INC hold		Swing	▲16.97	

=== Assembly Election 1967 ===
1967 Himachal Pradesh Legislative Assembly election: Palampur
Party	Candidate	Votes	%	±%
INC	Kunj Behari Lal Butail	5,644	47.47%	New
ABJS	S. Kumar	4,725	39.74%	New
CPI	K. Chand	1,137	9.56%	New
Independent	Thakur Dass	384	3.23%	New
Margin of victory		919	7.73%	
Turnout		11,890	57.69%	
Registered electors		21,805		
INC win (new seat)				

== See also ==
- Palampur
- List of constituencies of the Himachal Pradesh Legislative Assembly
- Kangra district
