= Butail =

Butail is a surname. Notable people with the surname include:

- Ashish Butail
- Brij Behari Lal Butail
- Kunj Behari Lal Butail
- Gokul Butail (Political strategist)
