= Yadvinder Goma =

Indian politician

Cabinet Minister for Ministry of Ayush in Government of Himachal Pradesh
- Incumbent
- Assumed office December 2023
- Preceded by: Ravinder Kumar
- Constituency: Jaisinghpur
- In office 2012–2017
- Preceded by: New constituency
- Constituency: Jaisinghpur

Personal details
- Born: 4 February 1986 (age 40) Palampur, Himachal Pradesh, Kangra
- Party: Indian National Congress
- Spouse: Neelam Yadvinder Goma
- Parent: Milkhi Ram Goma (father)
- Occupation: Politician
- Profession: Agriculturist

Yadvinder Goma (born 4 February 1986, Palampur, Himachal Pradesh, India) is anInian politician, Social worker and incumbent Member of Legislative Assembly from Jaisinghpur and cabinet minister in Government of Himachal Pradesh, India. In 2022, he won from Ravi Dhiman with a margin of 2,696 votes in Legislative Assembly elections. He has B.Tech. degree in mechanical engineering from Himachal Pradesh University and MBA degree. He got married in 2015.

== Political career ==
- 2010 - 2015, President of Indian Youth Congress Himachal unit
- 2011 - 2014, General Secretary of Rajeev Gandhi Panchayati Raj Sangathan
- 2012 - 2017, Member of the Legislative Assembly for Jaisinghpur Assembly constituency
- 2019 - 2021, President of Himachal Pradesh Congress Schedule Caste Cell
- 2022 - ongoing, 2nd term MLA for Jaisinghpur
- 2023 - ongoing, Cabinet Minister in Government of Himachal Pradesh

== Electoral performance ==
2022 Himachal Pradesh Legislative Assembly election: Jaisinghpur
Party	Candidate	Votes	%	±%
INC	Yadvinder Goma	28,058	50.43%	▲13.79
BJP	Ravi Dhiman	25,362	45.58%	▼12.10
Rashtriya Devbhumi Party	Sushil Kumar	943	1.69%	New
AAP	Santosh Kumar	697	1.25%	New
NOTA	Nota	298	0.54%	New
Independent	Surender Singh	155	0.28%	New
Independent	Dr. Kehar Singh	124	0.22%	New
Margin of victory		2,696	4.85%	▼16.20
Turnout		55,637	65.32%	▼0.37
Registered electors		85,180		▲9.94
INC gain from BJP		Swing	▼7.25	

2017 Himachal Pradesh Legislative Assembly election: Jaisinghpur
Party	Candidate	Votes	%	±%
BJP	Ravi Dhiman	29,357	57.68%	▲30.17
INC	Yadvinder Goma	18,647	36.64%	▼12.30
BSP	Kehar Singh	1,082	2.13%	▲0.34
All India Manavadhikar Rajnaitik Dal	Murlidhar	440	0.86%	New
Independent	Mohinder Kumar	387	0.76%	New
Margin of victory		10,710	21.04%	▼0.38
Turnout		50,896	65.69%	▲4.43
Registered electors		77,477		▲4.47
BJP gain from INC		Swing	▲8.75	

2012 Himachal Pradesh Legislative Assembly election: Jaisinghpur
Party	Candidate	Votes	%	±%
INC	Yadvinder Goma	22,233	48.93%	New
BJP	Atma Ram	12,498	27.51%	New
Independent	Ravinder Kumar	8,006	17.62%	New
BSP	Jago Ram	810	1.78%	New
Independent	Girdhari Singh "Dhari"	609	1.34%	New
HLC	Bachan Singh	456	1.00%	New
Independent	Dinesh Kumar	255	0.56%	New
SP	Jitender Kumar	252	0.55%	New
Margin of victory		9,735	21.43%	
Turnout		45,436	61.26%	
Registered electors		74,165		
INC win (new seat)				
