= Ashish Butail =

Indian Politician from Palampur

Chief Parliamentary Secretary, Government of Himachal Pradesh
- Incumbent
- Assumed office 8 January 2023
- Governor: Rajendra Arlekar (2022–2023); Shiv Pratap Shukla (2023–2026); Kavinder Gupta (2026–present)
- Chief Minister: Sukhvinder Singh Sukhu
- Deputy CM: Mukesh Agnihotri
- Ministry and Departments: Urban Development; Higher Education; Elementary Education
- Preceded by: Brij Behari Lal Butail

Member of the Himachal Pradesh Legislative Assembly
- Incumbent
- Assumed office 18 December 2017
- Preceded by: Ashish Butail
- Constituency: Palampur

Personal details
- Born: 9 January 1980 (age 46) Palampur, Himachal Pradesh, India
- Party: Indian National Congress
- Relations: Brij Behari Lal Butail (father); Kunj Behari Lal Butail (uncle)
- Alma mater: Symbiosis International University (B.Com)

Ashish Butail (born 9 January 1980) is an Indian politician, tea planter and entrepreneur. He belongs to the Indian National Congress party, and has been elected to the Himachal Pradesh Legislative Assembly from Palampur since 2018. He currently serves as Chief Parliamentary Secretary in Chief Minister Sukhvinder Singh Sukhu’s cabinet.

== Early life and education ==
Ashish Butail was born on 9 January 1980 to Brij Behari Lal and Beena Butail. His father is a stalwart of the Congress party who retired as Speaker of the Himachal Pradesh Legislative Assembly. His grandfather Lala Bansi Lal and great grandfather Lala Kanhaiya Lal were prominent Pragpur merchants and philanthropists who were actively involved with the Indian independence movement.

Butail was educated at the Bishop Cotton School, Shimla, and earned his B.Com degree from Symbiosis International University.

== Politics and career ==
Ashish Butail began his political career by entering the Indian Youth Congress, the youth wing of the Indian National Congress. He was the first elected President of the Lok Sabha Youth Congress Committee, Kangra (HP) from 2011 to 2013. He was appointed Secretary of the HP Congress Committee in 2014. He was subsequently appointed Treasurer of the Himachal Pradesh Congress Committee, and is currently the General Secretary of the Himachal Pradesh Congress Committee.

In December 2017 he contested his maiden election, defeating PM Narendra Modi’s confidant and BJP Mahila Morcha chief, Indu Goswami to represent Palampur in the 13th HP Vidhan Sabha. During his term in the opposition he was nominated as a member of the Estimates and Rural Planning Committees.

In December 2022 he was once again elected to the HP Vidhan Sabha, defeating BJP State General Secretary Trilok Kapoor. Butail has subsequently been appointed Chief Parliamentary Secretary in HP Chief Minister Sukhvinder Singh Sukhu’s cabinet. He currently holds charge of the Urban Development and Education departments.

== Personal life ==
He married Kanika Butail in 2009. They have one daughter.
