= Shakoh village, Himachal =

Shakoh Sakoh
- Village
- Location in Himachal Pradesh, India Shakoh (India)
- Coordinates: 31.86°N 76.51°E
- Country: India
- State: Himachal Pradesh
- Established: 1500 B.C
- Founder: Sansar Chand

Government
  - Type: Panchayat

Area
  - Total: 15 km^{2} (5.8 sq mi)
- Elevation: 733 m (2,405 ft)

Population (2011)
  - Total: 163 Rural
  - Density: 11/km^{2} (28/sq mi)

Languages
  - Official: Hindi
  - Additional official: Sanskrit
- Time zone: UTC+5:30 (IST)
- Postal code: 176082
- Vehicle registration: HP-56

Shakoh (also Sakoh ( शकोह ), Jaisinghpur) is a village panchayat, of Lambagaon block, Jaisinghpur tehsil of the Kangra district of Himachal Pradesh, in India. It is located in the border area of the Kangra-Hamirpur district. It is the central point to Hamirpur (37Km) and Palampur (44 Km). Shakoh is just 7 km away from Sujanpur Tira, a sub-town in the Hamirpur district, where Sainik School of Himachal is located. Kangra is one of twelve districts in Himachal Pradesh. Pin Code of Shakoh Village is 176 082 and the people of Shakoh village use the Pahadi dialect (Kangri).

Shakoh is the nearby village, which connects Jaisinghpur tehsil and further connects triple border of Hamirpur, Mandi, and Kangra (tri-border juncture).

Shakoh was the part of Kangra-Lambagraon, which was a historical state and later princely estate (jagir) of British India located in the present-day state of Himachal Pradesh.

Shakoh Village code is 480 ( Local Government Directory).

== Places ==
- Kali Mata Temple, Shakoh, Jaisinghpur
- Government Middle School, Shakoh

== Gallery ==
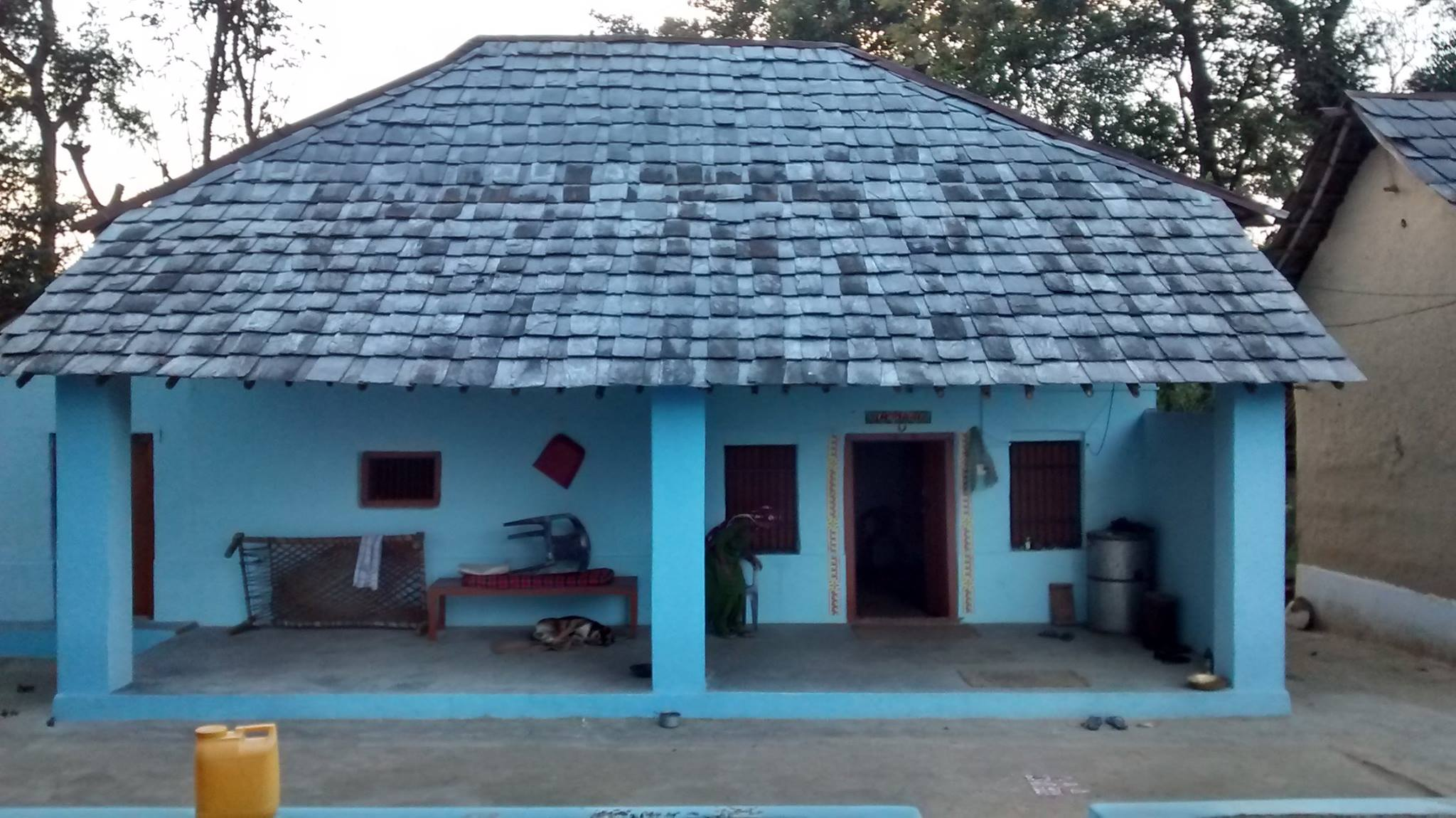
Adobe house in Shakoh Village

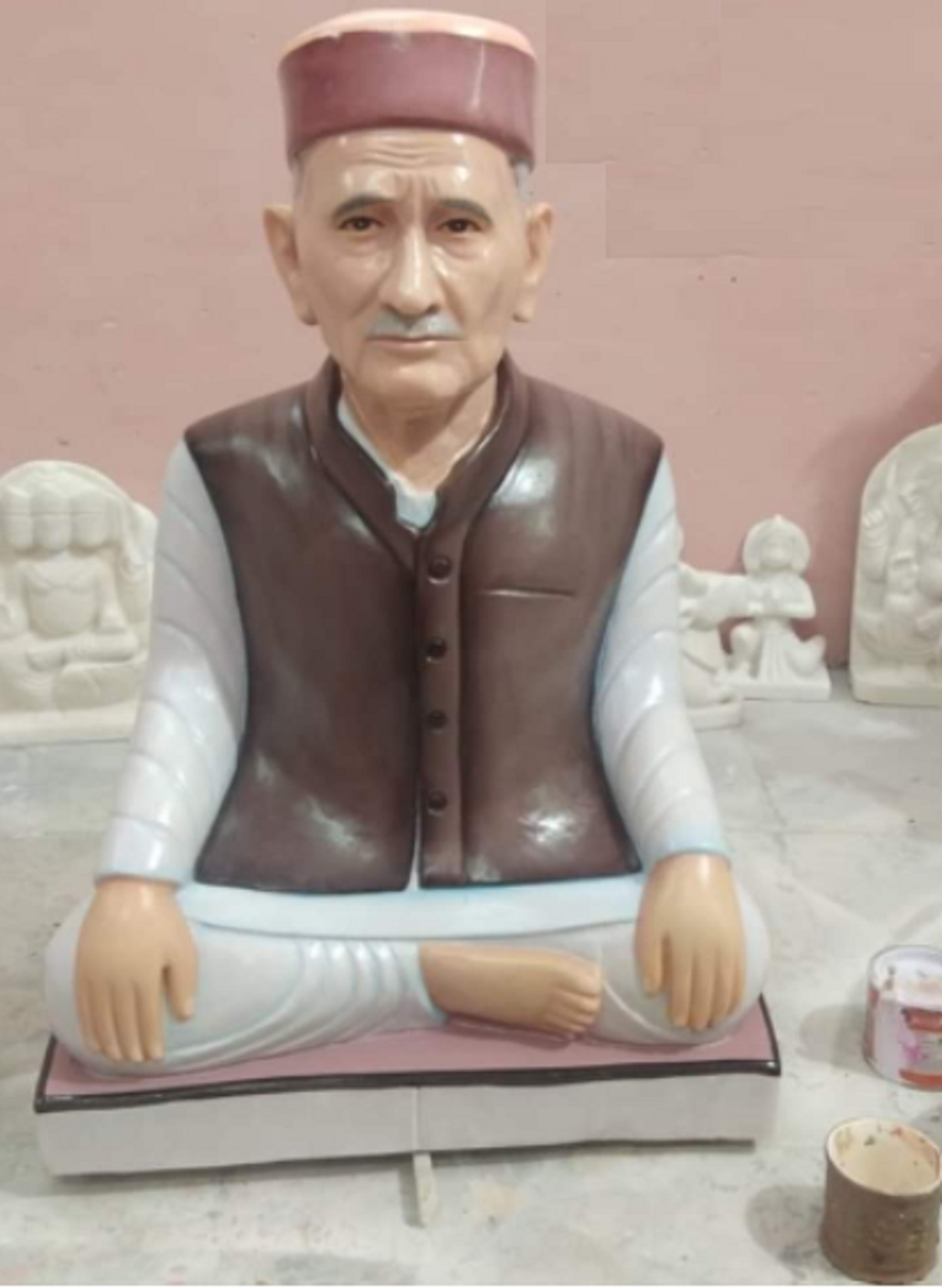
Late Havildar Dalip Singh Chambial statue in Shakoh

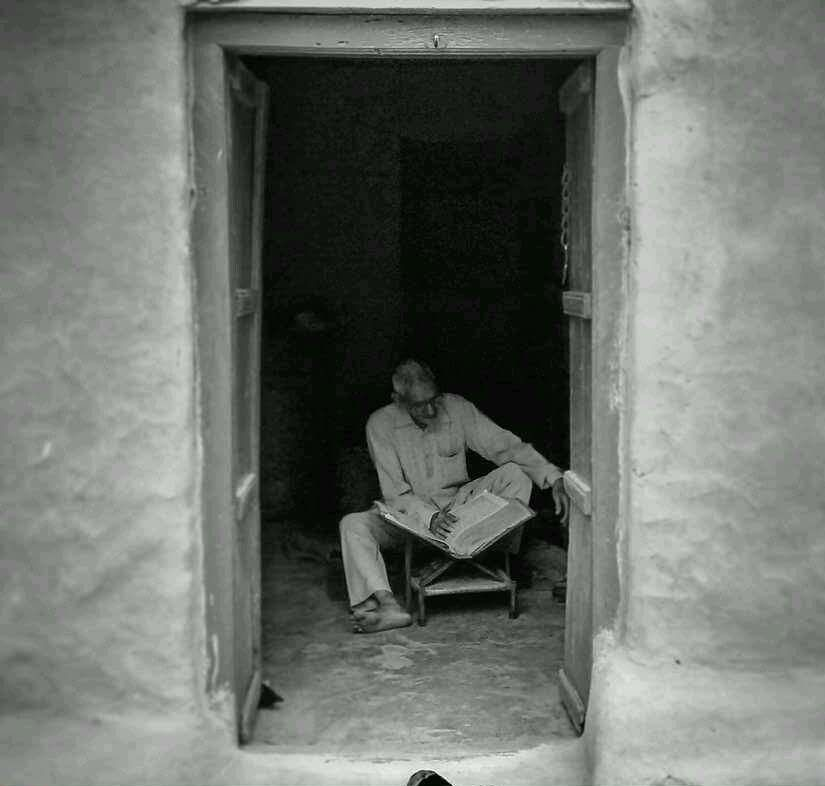
People of Shakoh

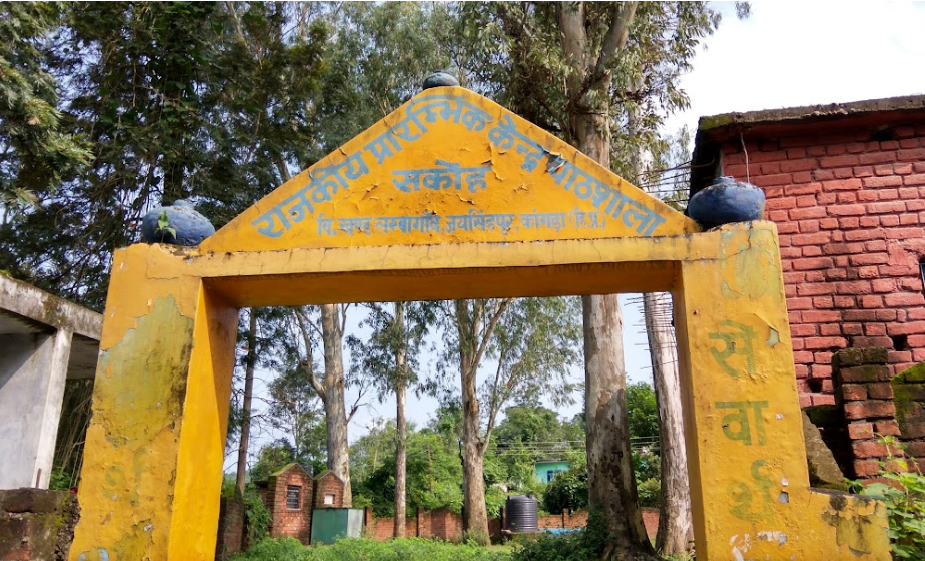
Govt Middle School Shakoh

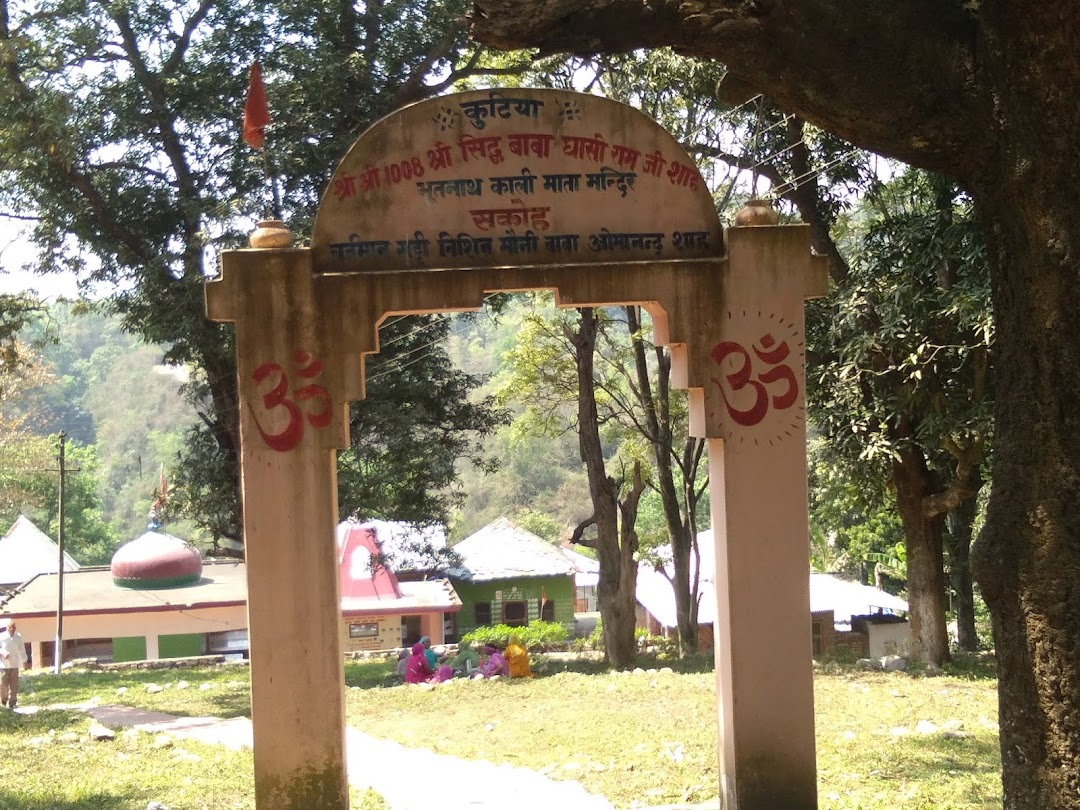
Entrance of Kali Mata Temple, Shakoh, Tehsil Jaisinghpur

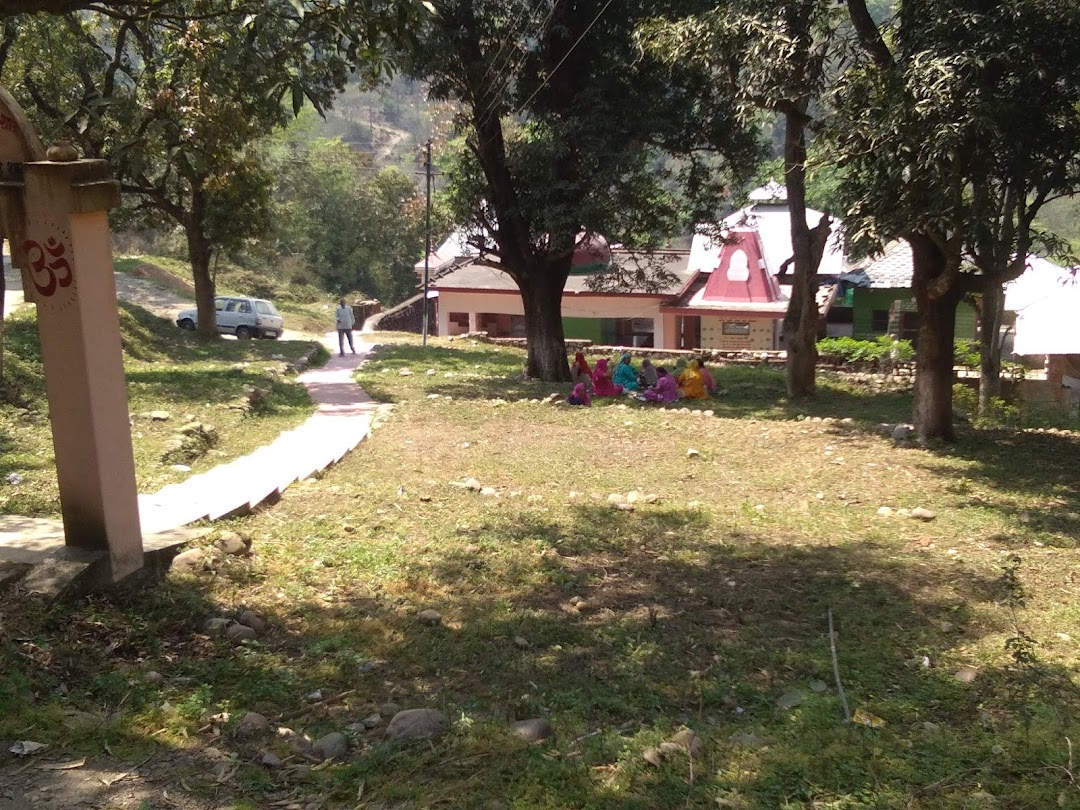
Kali Mata Temple, Shakoh, Tehsil Jaisinghpur
