= Sari Molag =

- Village
- Location in Himachal Pradesh, India Sari Molag (India)
- Coordinates: 31.930°N 76.665°E
- Country: India
- State: Himachal Pradesh
- District: Kangra

Population
  - Total: 1,200

Languages
  - Official: Hindi
- Time zone: UTC+5:30 (IST)
- PIN: 176089
- 01894: 911892xxxxxx
- Vehicle registration: HP-56

Sari Molag is a village of Himachal Pradesh, under Tehshil Jaisinghpur, Kangra district, India.

== See also ==
- Jaisinghpur
