= Ravinder Kumar (politician) =

Indian politician

Ravi Dhiman

Member of the Himachal Pradesh Legislative Assembly
- Incumbent
- Assumed office 2017
- Preceded by: Yadvinder Goma
- Constituency: Jaisinghpur

Personal details
- Born: 1 October 1961 (age 65) Alampur, Kangra, Himachal Pradesh
- Party: BJP
- Spouse: Anisha Dhiman
- Parents: Sh. Jagan Nath (father); Late Smt. Soma Devi (mother)
- Occupation: Social worker, politician, yogi
- Website: https://www.ravinderkumar.in

Ravinder Kumar (born October 1, 1961), publicly known as Ravi Dhiman, is an MLA from the Jaisinghpur constituency of Himachal Pradesh and a member of the Bharatiya Janata Party.

== Personal life ==
Ravi Dhiman was born in Jangal Kangra, Himachal Pradesh, India, the son of Soma Devi and Jagan Nath. He is married to Anisha Dhiman who works in the Education Department of Himachal Pradesh. They have a daughter and a son. He is a Graduate and CAIIB(I) from Indian Institute of Bankers.

== Career ==
Then he joined Defense Formations and worked there for two years. In 1986 he joined the Punjab National Bank as a stenographer, and in 2012 he took voluntary retirement.

== Politics ==
He ran as an independent candidate in 2012.

Joined BJP in February 2014; and Member, BJP State Executive Committee 2014 onwards.

In December 2017, he was elected to the State Legislative Assembly Jaisinghpur constituency and defeated Yadvendra Goma by a votes margin of 10,710.

He was nominated as Member, Welfare and General Development Committees.

== Electoral performance ==
2022 Himachal Pradesh Legislative Assembly election: Jaisinghpur
Party	Candidate	Votes	%	±%
INC	Yadvinder Goma	28,058	50.43%	▲13.79
BJP	Ravi Dhiman	25,362	45.58%	▼12.10
Rashtriya Devbhumi Party	Sushil Kumar	943	1.69%	New
AAP	Santosh Kumar	697	1.25%	New
NOTA	Nota	298	0.54%	New
Independent	Surender Singh	155	0.28%	New
Independent	Dr. Kehar Singh	124	0.22%	New
Margin of victory		2,696	4.85%	▼16.20
Turnout		55,637	65.32%	▼0.37
Registered electors		85,180		▲9.94
INC gain from BJP		Swing	▼7.25	

2017 Himachal Pradesh Legislative Assembly election: Jaisinghpur
Party	Candidate	Votes	%	±%
BJP	Ravi Dhiman	29,357	57.68%	▲30.17
INC	Yadvinder Goma	18,647	36.64%	▼12.30
BSP	Kehar Singh	1,082	2.13%	▲0.34
All India Manavadhikar Rajnaitik Dal	Murlidhar	440	0.86%	New
Independent	Mohinder Kumar	387	0.76%	New
Margin of victory		10,710	21.04%	▼0.38
Turnout		50,896	65.69%	▲4.43
Registered electors		77,477		▲4.47
BJP gain from INC		Swing	▲8.75	

2012 Himachal Pradesh Legislative Assembly election: Jaisinghpur
Party	Candidate	Votes	%	±%
INC	Yadvinder Goma	22,233	48.93%	New
BJP	Atma Ram	12,498	27.51%	New
Independent	Ravinder Kumar	8,006	17.62%	New
BSP	Jago Ram	810	1.78%	New
Independent	Girdhari Singh "Dhari"	609	1.34%	New
HLC	Bachan Singh	456	1.00%	New
Independent	Dinesh Kumar	255	0.56%	New
SP	Jitender Kumar	252	0.55%	New
Margin of victory		9,735	21.43%	
Turnout		45,436	61.26%	
Registered electors		74,165		
INC win (new seat)				

== Current life ==
He lives in Alampur sub tehsil of Jaisinghpur tehsil of Kangra district, along with his wife.

He is also a chairperson of NGO Projects.
