= Dongyu Gatsal Ling Nunnery =

Coordinates: 32.0716°N 76.5917°E

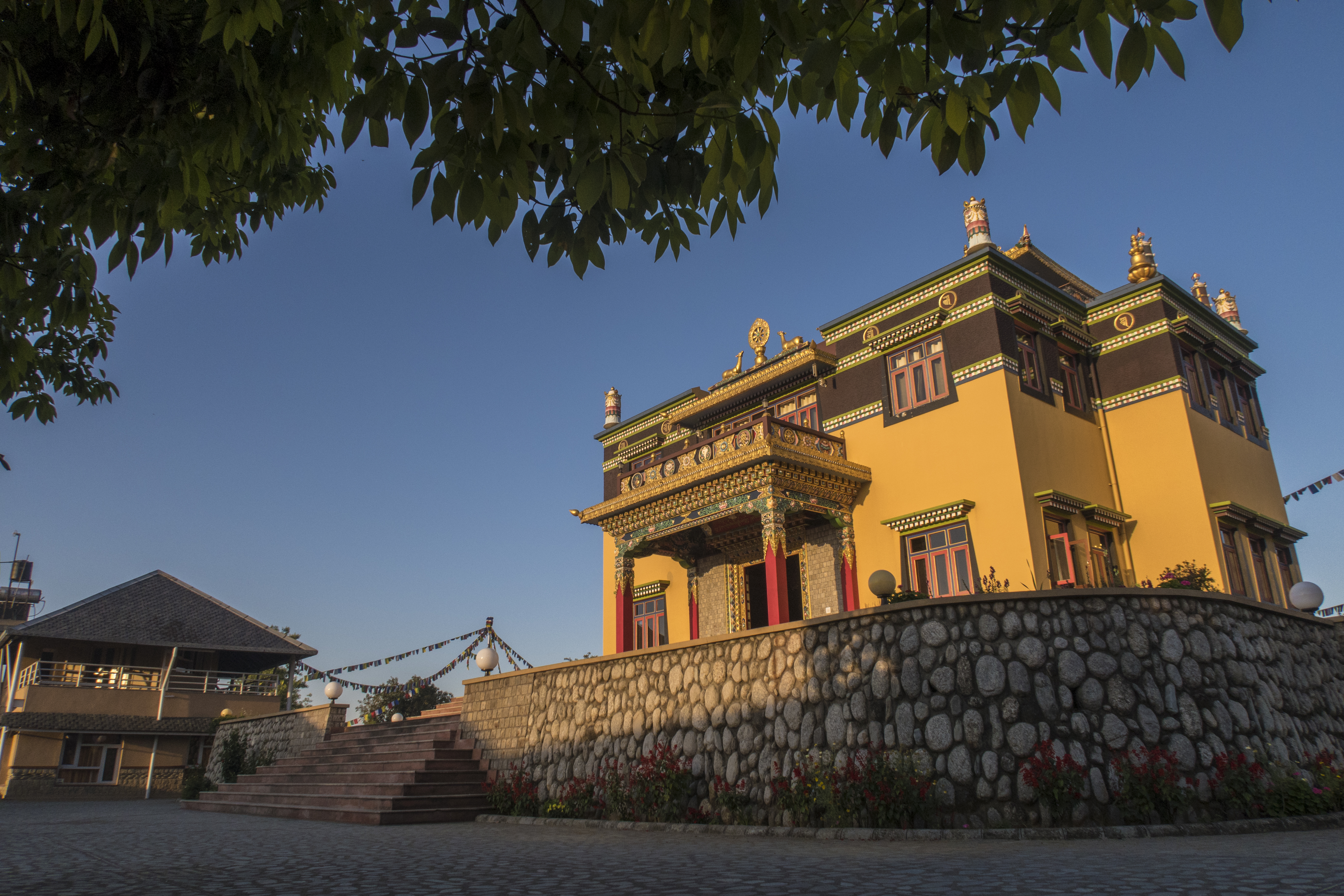
The Main Temple in DGL Nunnery.

Dongyu Gatsal Ling Nunnery (DGL Nunnery) is a Tibetan Buddhist nunnery in the Drukpa Kagyu lineage, and it is located near Palampur in the Kangra Valley of Himachal Pradesh, India. Founded in 1999 by Jetsunma Tenzin Palmo, the nunnery is dedicated to providing young women from Tibet and the Himalayan border regions with study of Buddhist philosophy and contemplative practice. A primary mission of the nunnery is the revival of the Togdenma (yogini) tradition.

== Etymology ==
Dongyu Gatsal Ling roughly translates from Tibetan as "Garden of the Authentic Lineage". It was named by the 9th Khamtrul Rinpoche, Shedrup Nyima. The name "Dongyu" specifically honours Dongyu Nyima, the 8th Khamtrul Rinpoche, who was the Root Guru of Jetsunma Tenzin Palmo.

== History ==
The origins of the nunnery stem from a request made by the 8th Khamtrul Rinpoche to his disciple, the English-born nun Tenzin Palmo, before his death in 1980. After spending twelve years in a remote Himalayan cave retreat, Tenzin Palmo began fundraising globally to fulfil this request.

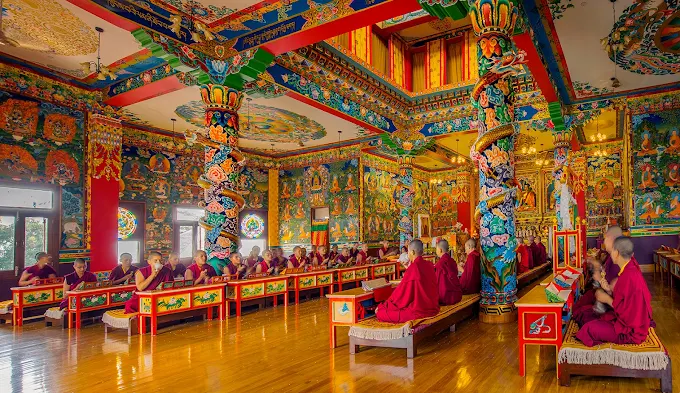
DGL nuns doing puja (ritual) in the Main Temple.

In 1999 the Dongyu Gatsal Ling Trust was founded, and in January 2000 the nunnery officially opened in a small rented house in Tashi Jong with an initial group of nuns from Ladakh. By 2005, the community moved to its current permanent site, a former tea plantation spanning several acres near the Khampagar Monastery.

The construction of the nunnery's Main Temple was started in 2007, and it was consecrated in 2013.

In June 2022, three nuns from DGL Nunnery were among the first group of nuns in the history of Tibetan Buddhism to receive full Gelongma (Bhikshuni) ordination. His Holiness the Je Khenpo, the spiritual head of Bhutan, personally presided over the ceremonies which took place in Paro, Bhutan.

In December 2023, four senior nuns graduated as DGL Nunnery's first Khenmos (the female equivalent of a Khenpo, or Doctor of Buddhist Philosophy) officially receiving their Khenmo titles from the 9th Khamtrul Rinpoche.

In October 2024, the institution celebrated its Silver Jubilee (25th anniversary), marking a milestone in the advancement of female monasticism in the region. As part of the celebrations, four DGL nuns were officially recognised as Togdenmas after completing over 16 years of retreat.

In November 2025, approximately 50 DGL nuns traveled to Bhutan and received their Gelongma vows from His Holiness the Je Khenpo, transforming DGL from a nunnery of novices into a fully established Gelongma nunnery.

== Education and training ==
The nunnery hosts approximately 120 nuns (as of 2026) from Tibet, Bhutan, Nepal, and the Indian Himalayan regions. The training program is divided into several sections:

Section	Focus
Study Centre	The monastic college where nuns study Buddhist Philosophy, Debate, Tibetan Grammar, and English.
Drubda	The retreat centre for long-term practitioners.
Ritual Arts	Training in sacred dance (Cham), ritual music, and the creation of tormas (ritual offerings).

== Architecture and facilities ==
The nunnery complex is designed to reflect traditional Himachali and Tibetan aesthetics while accommodating modern needs. Key facilities include:

Main Temple: Unique for its focus on the "divine feminine", the temple features murals and statues of female enlightened beings, such as Mahaprajapati, the 21 Taras, Machig Labdrön, Prajna Paramita, and female disciples of Milarepa.

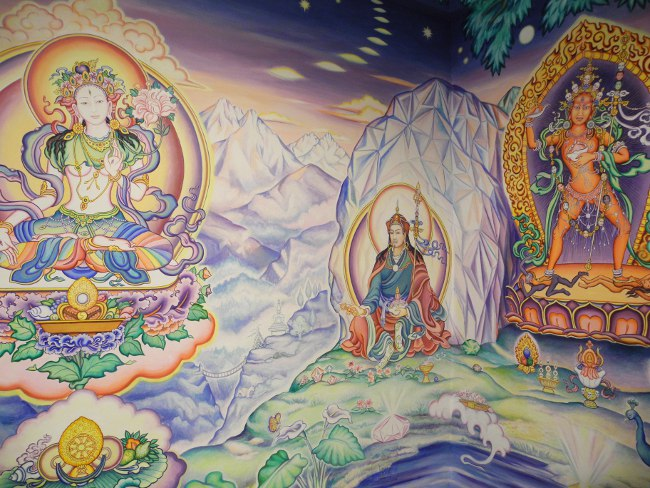
Mural by Marianna Rydvald in the Tara Temple of DGL Nunnery.

Tara Temple: Smaller shrine room where the nuns perform the daily ritual of reciting the 21 Praises to Tara. Unlike most traditional Tibetan Buddhist Temples, the walls of this shrine room are decorated by Swedish artist Marianna Rydvald.

Study Centre: The main building where the nuns have their classes and train in debate. It also holds a library which contains various books on Buddhism in Tibetan and English Language.

Retreat Centre: A secluded area where nuns, after finishing the foundational study programme, undertake long-term retreat for several years. There is also a separate retreat centre where lay women can do shorter retreats (up to three months).

Clinic: On-site facilities to support the health of the community.
