= Haler, Himachal Pradesh =

Haler
- village
- Location in Himachal Pradesh, India Haler (India)
- Coordinates: 31.897°N 76.637°E
- Country: India
- State: Himachal Pradesh
- District: Kangra
- Elevation: 562 m (1,844 ft)

Population (2001)
  - Total: 679

Languages
  - Official: Hindi
- Time zone: UTC+5:30 (IST)
- Pin Code: 176 091
- Telephone code: 911892xxxxxx
- Vehicle registration: HP HP-56

Haler is a village of Himachal Pradesh, under Tehsil Jaisinghpur, Kangra district, India. It is located between Dalu village and Thanpal village. It is situated on the bank of the River Beas.

== Village profile ==
As of Census of India 2001

Area details
Area of village (in hectares) - 126
Number of households - 146
Population data based on 2001 census
Total population - Persons - 679
Total population - Males - 306
Total population - Females - 373
Scheduled castes population - Persons - 104
Scheduled castes population - Males - 48
Scheduled castes population - Females - 56
Education facilities
Number of primary schools - 1
Number of middle schools - 1
College available within range - Within 5 km
Medical facilities
Allopathic hospitals available within range - More than 10 km
Maternity and child welfare centre available within range - Within 5 km
Primary health centre available within range - Within 5 km
Number of primary health sub centre - 1
Post, telegraph and telephone facilities
Number of post office - 1
Number of telephone connections - 14
Banking facilities
Commercial bank available within range - Within 5 km
Land use (Two decimal) in hectares
Number of forest land - 2
Number of government canal - 0
Number of private canal - 22.00
Total irrigated area - 22.00
Unirrigated area - 22.00
Culturable waste (including gauchar and groves) - 25.00
Area not available for cultivation - 55.00
