= Jaisinghpur Assembly constituency =

Legislative Assembly constituency in Himachal Pradesh State, India

Coordinates: 31.9°N 76.6°E

Jaisinghpur
- Constituency No. 13 for the Himachal Pradesh Legislative Assembly

Constituency details
- Country: India
- Region: North India
- State: Himachal Pradesh
- District: Kangra
- Lok Sabha constituency: Kangra
- Established: 2008
- Total electors: 85,180
- Reservation: SC

Member of Legislative Assembly
- 14th Himachal Pradesh Legislative Assembly
- Incumbent Yadvinder Goma
- Party: Indian National Congress
- Elected year: 2022

Jaisinghpur is one of the 68 constituencies in the Himachal Pradesh Legislative Assembly of Himachal Pradesh a northern state of India. Jaisinghpur is also part of Kangra Lok Sabha constituency.

== Members of Legislative Assembly ==
Year	Member	Party
2012	Yadvinder Goma	Indian National Congress
2017	Ravinder Kumar	Bharatiya Janata Party
2022	Yadvinder Goma	Indian National Congress

== Election results ==
=== Assembly Election 2022 ===
2022 Himachal Pradesh Legislative Assembly election: Jaisinghpur
Party	Candidate	Votes	%	±%
INC	Yadvinder Goma	28,058	50.43%	▲13.79
BJP	Ravi Dhiman	25,362	45.58%	▼12.10
Rashtriya Devbhumi Party	Sushil Kumar	943	1.69%	New
AAP	Santosh Kumar	697	1.25%	New
NOTA	Nota	298	0.54%	New
Independent	Surender Singh	155	0.28%	New
Independent	Dr. Kehar Singh	124	0.22%	New
Margin of victory		2,696	4.85%	▼16.20
Turnout		55,637	65.32%	▼0.37
Registered electors		85,180		▲9.94
INC gain from BJP		Swing	▼7.25	

=== Assembly Election 2017 ===
2017 Himachal Pradesh Legislative Assembly election: Jaisinghpur
Party	Candidate	Votes	%	±%
BJP	Ravi Dhiman	29,357	57.68%	▲30.17
INC	Yadvinder Goma	18,647	36.64%	▼12.30
BSP	Kehar Singh	1,082	2.13%	▲0.34
All India Manavadhikar Rajnaitik Dal	Murlidhar	440	0.86%	New
Independent	Mohinder Kumar	387	0.76%	New
Margin of victory		10,710	21.04%	▼0.38
Turnout		50,896	65.69%	▲4.43
Registered electors		77,477		▲4.47
BJP gain from INC		Swing	▲8.75	

=== Assembly Election 2012 ===
2012 Himachal Pradesh Legislative Assembly election: Jaisinghpur
Party	Candidate	Votes	%	±%
INC	Yadvinder Goma	22,233	48.93%	New
BJP	Atma Ram	12,498	27.51%	New
Independent	Ravinder Kumar	8,006	17.62%	New
BSP	Jago Ram	810	1.78%	New
Independent	Girdhari Singh "Dhari"	609	1.34%	New
HLC	Bachan Singh	456	1.00%	New
Independent	Dinesh Kumar	255	0.56%	New
SP	Jitender Kumar	252	0.55%	New
Margin of victory		9,735	21.43%	
Turnout		45,436	61.26%	
Registered electors		74,165		
INC win (new seat)				

== See also ==
- Jaisinghpur
- Kangra district
- List of constituencies of Himachal Pradesh Legislative Assembly
