= Khamtrul Rinpoche =

Drukpa Kagyu Buddhist tulku lineage

The Khamtrul tulku lineage is part of the Dongyud Palden section of the Drukpa Lineage of the Kagyu school of Tibetan Buddhism.

== Origins ==
The Fourth Gyalwang Drukpa Kunkhyen Pema Karpo, head of the Drukpa Lineage, was one of the most celebrated masters in the 16th century. One of his most accomplished disciples, Lhatsewa Ngawang Zangpo (the First Yongdzin Rinpoche), had numerous disciples. Among those disciples, nine attained the level of realization where there is no distinction between the states of meditation and non-meditation (Gom-Med). One of these disciples was Ngawang Tenphel who became the 1st Khamtrul Rinpoche. Khamtrul means the reincarnation (tulku) from Kham.

It is said that the appearance of the Khamtrul lineage was foretold by Padmasambhava (Guru Rinpoche), among other renowned Rinpoches. The Khamtrul Rinpoche is also said to be an authentic emanation of Padmasambhava and an emanation of King Gesar, the hero of the epic tale King Gesar.

== The lives of the Khamtrul Rinpoches ==
=== The First Khamtrul Rinpoche Ngawang Tenphel (1569–1627) ===
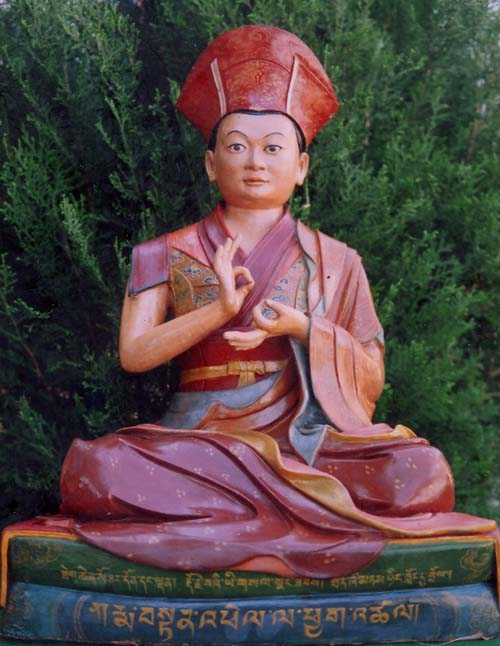
The First Gyalwa Dokhampa Ngawang Tenphel

The 1st Khamtrul Rinpoche was born to Yab Khandro Bum and Yum Ri Nyima in Khotsa Rinchengang in Kham. From an early age, he took a liking to wearing the white cotton clothing worn by wandering yogis and would declare that he was a tokden of the Drukpa lineage. This earned him the nickname 'drukpa'. He was sent to Samten Lingpey Densa monastery, where – under the guidance of the master Sonam Gyaltshen – he was taught the preliminary studies and named Sonam Wangchuk.

While studying, he learned of a set of teachings taking place in central Tibet. At the teachings he heard of the teacher Lhatsewa Ngawang Zangpo (the 1st Drukpa Yongdzin Rinpoche), and travelled further to receive teachings from him. Upon meeting Lhatsewa Ngawang Zangpo, the young monk recognised him as his guru. He soon received the vows of monkhood from him and was given the name Ngawang Tenphel. It is said that he reached enlightenment very quickly under the instruction of Lhatsewa Ngawang Zangpo.

He returned to Kham soon afterwards, supposedly in the garb of a yogi (the same sort of plain white clothing he took to wearing years earlier). The people of Kham were reluctant in accepting the Rinpoche, however, and are said to have abused and beat him almost to death. As part of his work he was to have gone into China to further spread his message, but upon seeing a vision of the mountains of China, chose instead to remain in Kham. The various kings of Kham revered him as a spiritual leader, allowing him to mediate between them and help settle their disputes.

He continued his practice and his teaching until his death, including spending periods of up to three years on meditation retreat. He died at a retreat centre named Mishig Dorji Dzong gyi Drubney.

During his lifetime, the 1st Khamtrul Rinpoche spread his teachings widely in Kham, setting up retreat centers, educational institutes, monasteries and nunneries. There were almost two hundred branches of Khampagar Monastery in Kham region alone due to his work.

As a result of this, the rinpoche gained a great number of followers. The three main disciples of his were Zigar Sonam Gyamtso, the 1st Zigar Rinpoche, Trulshik Trinley Gyatso, the 1st Adeu Rinpoche, and Drugu Choegyal Gyatso, the 1st Choegyal Rinpoche. These three Dharma brothers were known as the three oceans. All three lineages still exist and the current lineage holders, especially Choegyal Rinpoche, continue to have a close relationship with the Khamtrul Rinpoche; the 9th Zigar Rinpoche resides at Rewalsar, India, the 8th Adeu Rinpoche died in July 2007 (his next incarnation is yet to be discovered) and the 8th Drugu Choegyal Rinpoche helps Dorzong Rinpoche with the latter's monastery, known as Jangchub Jong, in Himachal Pradesh, India, and is rebuilding his monastery in Tibet.

=== The Second Khamtrul Rinpoche Ngawang Kunga Tenphel (1639–1679) ===
Source:

=== The Third Khamtrul Rinpoche Ngawang Kunga Tenzin (1680–1728) ===
Ngawang Kunga Tenzin was responsible for the founding of Pal Phuntsok Choekor Ling monastery in Kham, more popularly known as Khampagar monastery, under the patronage of the King of Lhathog. The residence of the 9th Khamtrul Rinpoche Shedrub Nyima in Tashi Jong, Himachal Pradesh, India is likewise known as Khampagar monastery, though its full name is Pal Phuntsok Choekor Ling. Ngawang Kunga Tenzin was well known for his scholarship, having written seventeen volumes of commentaries including explanations regarding the preliminary and actual practice of Mahamudra and its mind teachings.

=== The Fourth Khamtrul Rinpoche Tenzin Chokyi Nyima (1730–1779) ===
Tenzin Chokyi Nyima wrote a commentary on Tibetan poetry, Khampai Nyen Ngag Drelchen, which is said to be highly respected throughout Tibet. Inspired by his teacher, the Third Khamtrul Rinpoche, he founded the Khampa Gar Monastery in Chamdo County, Kham, which became the seat of the Khamtrul lineage.

=== The Fifth Khamtrul Rinpoche Mipham Drubgyud Nyima (1781–1847) ===
Source:

=== The Sixth Khamtrul Rinpoche Tenpai Nyima (1849–1907) ===
Source:

=== The Seventh Khamtrul Rinpoche Mipham Sangye Tenzin (1909–1929) ===
Source:

=== The Eighth Khamtrul Rinpoche Dongyud Nyima (1931–1980) ===
Born in 1931, the 8th Khamtrul Rinpoche was still quite young when the Battle of Chamdo began in October 1950. He remained in Tibet through the resistance movement in Kham and Amdo in June 1956, but when this was crushed, with serious ramifications for the citizens – including the monks and nuns – he realised he had to leave. In 1958 he left for India with a group of 16 monks and tulkus. The 14th Dalai Lama would leave Tibet soon after following the failure of the 1959 Tibetan uprising.

Initially the 8th Khamtrul Rinpoche and his followers settled in Kalimpong, West Bengal. There, a number of exiles from the area surrounding the original Khampagar monastery became affiliated with them. In 1969 this community moved west to Himachal Pradesh and settled in a village called Jekhli Beth. The village lies about 10 kilometres (6.2 mi) east of Palampur and about 4 kilometres (2.5 mi) west of Baijnath in the Kangra district of Himachal Pradesh. The move brought them just two hours from the Dalai Lama's residence in McLeod Ganj. They were granted 37 acres (150,000 m^{2}) of land and named it Tashi Jong, which is Tibetan for "Auspicious (or Happy) Valley".

The area is an historically holy part of Northeast India known as Ngalen gyi Yul.

It is said that when he visited Tashi Jong, the 8th Khamtrul Rinpoche had a vision of the peaceful and wrathful Manjusri. In the vision, Tashi Jong and its surroundings were formed by a body, speech, mind quality and activity mandala of Manjusri. The rinpoche took this as a sign to settle there and to re-establish the Khampagar monastery.

The rinpoche rebuilt the Khampagar monastery, with the work being done by the lay community, monks and reincarnated lamas together. The rinpoche himself was a skilled artist and created many of the statues and paintings which can be seen in the monastery today. Tashi Jong has since flourished into a community of 150 monks, both in the monastery and the Khampagar Institute, a school teaching Buddhist philosophy which is connected to the monastery. There is also a lay community of around 400 people and a retreat centre for tokdens that houses about 15 yogis. The recreation of the monastery saw the resurgence of cham, or 'lama-dances', ritual dances by the monks, for which Tashi Jong has gained a high reputation (attracting a number of tourists, both Buddhist and non-Buddhist, each year). Throughout their years in exile, the rinpoche and his followers kept up the observance of their pujas.

The Khamtrul Rinpoche is also well known as the root guru of Tenzin Palmo, an English nun and only the second Western woman to be ordained as a Tibetan Buddhist śrāmaṇerī and, subsequently, one of the first Tibetan Buddhist women ever to be ordained as a full bhikṣuṇī in 1973. The 8th Khamtrul Rinpoche gave her the Tibetan name Tenzin Palmo (she was originally called Diane Perry) and instructed her to build a nunnery near Tashi Jong. This request resulted in Dongyu Gatsal Ling (DGL) Nunnery, just a couple of kilometres from Tashi Jong. As of 2025, the nunnery is the home of more than 100 nuns, including four Khenmos and four Togdenmas.

In later life, the 8th Khamtrul Rinpoche visited Bhutan on a few occasions, giving teachings and initiations. In 1980, at the age of 49, he died due to ill health. According to Tibetan Buddhist tradition, bodhisattvas can have multiple incarnations; the 8th Khamtrul Rinpoche has two recognised reincarnations (with no disputes about the veracity of either).

=== The Ninth Khamtrul Rinpoche Shedrub Nyima (1980–) ===
The 9th Khamtrul Rinpoche was born in 1980 at Bomdila, Arunachal Pradesh . He was recognised as a reincarnation of the 8th by Rangjung Rigpe Dorje, 16th Karmapa and by Dilgo Khyentse, who both predicted the same names of the parents. It was said that, in his youth, Shedrub Nyima was often seen in a position of meditation and that he inspired awe in those who saw him. He received training and instruction from various sources, including from Tokden Amtrin, a highly respected yogi at Tashi Jong (who died on 1 July 2005) and from the late Adeu Rinpoche (the first incarnation of whom was a student of the 1st Khamtrul Rinpoche). Shedrub Nyima currently maintains his seat as the head of Khampagar monastery in Tashi Jong, the monastery founded by his predecessor. He is also the spiritual head of Tenzin Palmo's nunnery, Dongyu Gatsal Ling.

=== The Ninth Khamtrul Rinpoche Jigme Pema Nyinjadh (1981–) ===
The Ninth Khamtrul Rinpoche Jigme Pema Nyinjadh was born in 1981, into the family of the Twelfth Gyalwang Drukpa, supreme head of the Drukpa Lineage. His root teacher is Gyalwang Drukpa with father Karma Dorjee and mother Chimey Yudon. He was recognized by the Dalai Lama, the Gyalwang Drukpa and the First Thuksey Rinpoche. His basic studies were done at Druk Thupten Sangag Choeling Monastery in Darjeeling. There he spent his childhood and teenage years under the guidance of his root teacher, Gyalwang Drukpa. His other main teacher was Omze Sherab, a disciple of Trulshik Pema Chogyel, the enlightened Drukpa yogi who was also the teacher of the Eleventh Gyalwang Drukpa. Khamtrul Rinpoche has completed the nine-year course in Buddhist philosophy at Tango University in Bhutan, as advised by the Gyalwang Drukpa. Studying with him were his Dharma friends and heart friends, such as Gyelsey Trulku Rinpoche Mipham Tenzin Wangpo (who was the spiritual representative of Shabdrung Ngawang Namgyal after he died), the Second Thuksey Rinpoche, other tulkus and over 200 monks. Now Khamtrul Rinpoche is the representative of the Gyalwang Drukpa in all Asian countries and resides mainly in Nepal at Druk Amitabha mountain the seat of Gyalwang Drukpa the Head of Drukpa Lineage
