= Tenzin Palmo =

Tibetan Buddhist bhikṣuṇī

Jetsunma Tenzin Palmo
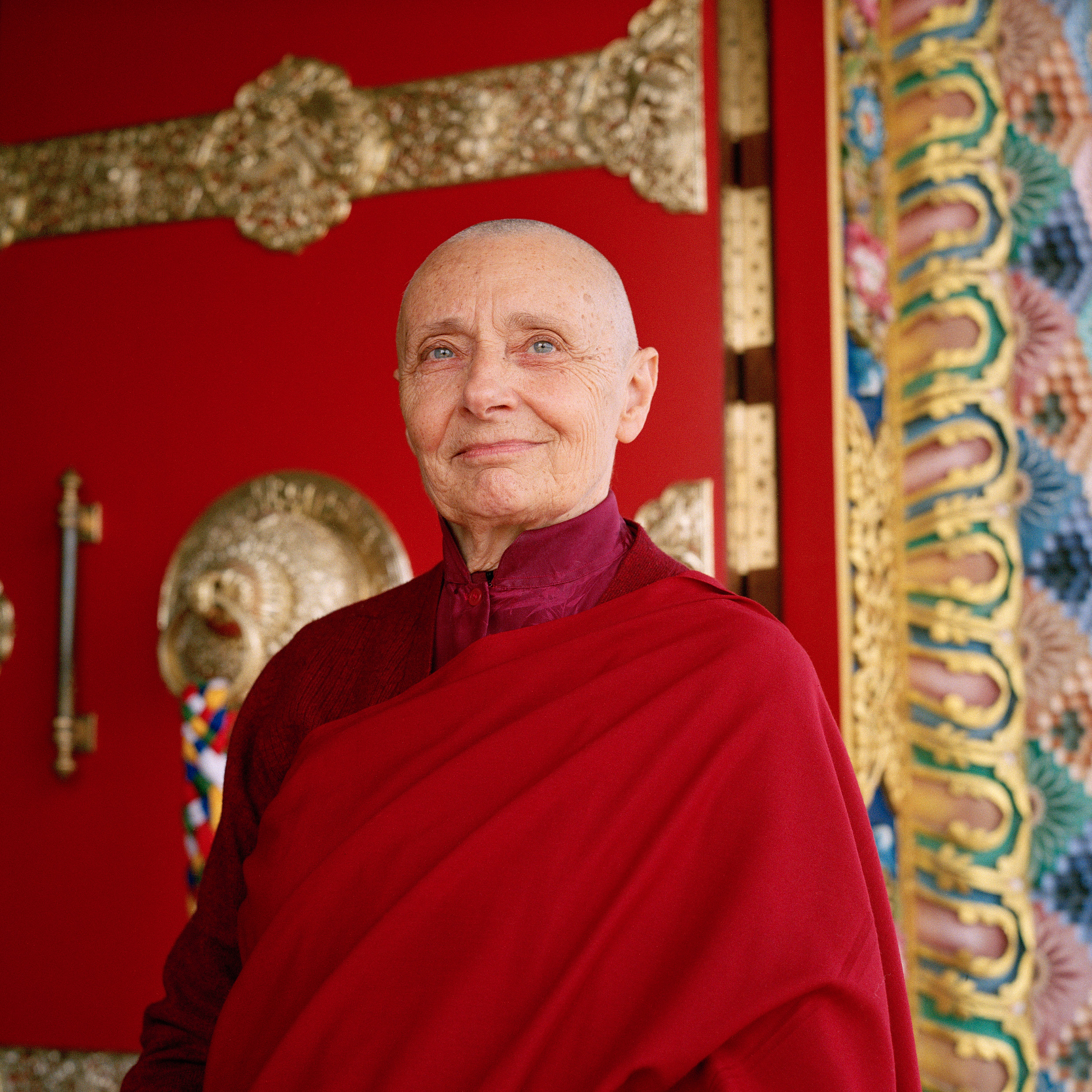
- Jetsunma Tenzin Palmo in front of the Temple in DGL Nunnery, 2015.

Personal life
- Born: 30 June 1943 (age 83) Woolmers Park, Hertfordshire, England

Religious life
- Religion: Tibetan Buddhism
- School: Kagyu
- Lineage: Drukpa Kagyu

Jetsunma Tenzin Palmo (born 1943) is a bhikṣuṇī in the Drukpa Kagyu lineage of the Kagyu school of Tibetan Buddhism. She is an author, teacher and founder of Dongyu Gatsal Ling Nunnery in Himachal Pradesh, India. She is best known for being one of the few Western yoginis trained in the East, having spent twelve years living in a remote cave in the Himalayas, three of those years in strict meditation retreat.

Vicki Mackenzie, who wrote Cave in the Snow about her, relates that what inspired the writing of the book was reading Tenzin Palmo's statement to a Buddhist magazine that "I have made a vow to attain Enlightenment in the female form - no matter how many lifetimes it takes".

== Early life ==
Jetsunma Tenzin Palmo was born Diane Perry in Woolmers Park, Hertfordshire, England, on 30 June 1943. Although spiritualist meetings were held in her childhood home, she realised at the age of 18 that she was a Buddhist when she read a library book, "Mind Unshaken: A Modern Approach to Buddhism" by John Walters, on the subject. She moved to India at 20, where she taught English at the Young Lamas Home School for a few months before meeting her root lama, the 8th Khamtrul Rinpoche.

== Career ==
In 1964 she became the second Western woman to be ordained in the Vajrayana tradition, receiving the name Drubgyu Tenzin Palmo, or "Glorious Lady who Upholds the Doctrine of the Practice Succession". The ordination was as a śrāmaṇerī, or novice nun, the highest level of ordination available for women in the Tibetan tradition at the time because the bhikṣuṇī sangha had never been established there. However, with the support of her teacher, in 1973 Tenzin Palmo received the full bhikṣuṇī ordination in Hong Kong, one of the first Western women to do so.

Living at Khamtrul Rinpoche's monastery as the sole nun among 100 monks provided Tenzin Palmo with first-hand experience of the discrimination that restricted women's access to information that was imparted freely to men. Eager for instruction, she felt frustrated by the fact that she was kept out of most monastic activities because of misogynistic prejudices. She recounts,

When I first came to India I lived in a monastery with 100 monks. I was the only nun... I think that is why I eventually went to live by myself in a cave... The monks were kind, and I had no problems of sexual harassment or troubles of that sort, but of course I was unfortunately within a female form. They actually told me they prayed that in my next life I would have the good fortune to be reborn as a male so that I could join in all the monastery's activities. In the meantime, they said, they didn't hold it too much against me that I had this inferior rebirth in the female form. It wasn't too much my fault.

This phase lasted for six years. Then Tenzin Palmo left the monastery at her teacher's suggestion to go to Lahaul in the higher reaches of the Indian Himalayas, where she would eventually enter the cave and launch herself into uninterrupted, intense spiritual practice.

== The cave ==
In 1976 Tenzin Palmo commenced living in a cave in the Himalayas measuring 10 feet wide and six feet deep and remained there for 12 years, for three of which she was in full retreat. The cave was high in the remote Lahaul area of the Indian Himalayas (nearby Tayul Gompa), on the border of Himachal Pradesh and Tibet. In the course of the retreat she grew her own food and practised deep meditation based on ancient Buddhist methods. In accordance with protocol, she never lay down, sleeping in a traditional wooden meditation box in a meditative posture for just three hours a night. The last three years were spent in complete isolation. She survived temperatures of below −30°F (−35°C) and snow for six to eight months of the year.

== Activism ==
Tenzin Palmo emerged from the cave in 1988 and travelled to Italy as visa problems meant she needed to leave India. Since her retreat Tenzin Palmo has taken on the cause of equal rights and opportunities for Buddhist nuns. In support of this, she spent several years travelling the world fundraising for a new Buddhist nunnery, as her root lama had asked her to do. In 2000, Dongyu Gatsal Ling Nunnery was opened with the purpose of giving education and training to women from Tibet and the Himalayan border regions. At this nunnery, Tenzin Palmo has also re-established the extinct lineage of Togdenmas, a Drukpa Kagyu yogini order, with four nuns becoming officially recognised as Togdenmas in 2024 after 16 years of retreat within the nunnery.

Tenzin Palmo is a member of the six member "Committee of Western Bhikshunis", an organisation of senior Western nuns supported by two Advisors from Taiwan – the Ven. Bhiksuni Heng-ching Shih, Professor of Philosophy at Taiwan National University [Gelongma ordination 1975 in San Francisco] and Ven. Bhikshuni Wu-yin, Vinaya Master. It was formed in the autumn of 2005, after the Dalai Lama told Bhikshuni Jampa Tsedroen that the Western bhikshunis should be more involved in helping to establish the bhikshuni ordination in the Tibetan tradition.

Tenzin Palmo is a strict vegetarian for ethical reasons.

== Recognition ==
On 16 February 2008, Tenzin Palmo received the title of Jetsunma (reverend lady) in recognition of her spiritual achievements as a nun and her efforts in promoting the status of female practitioners in Tibetan Buddhism by the head of the Drukpa Lineage, the 12th Gyalwang Drukpa.

In November 2023, Tenzin Palmo was named to the BBC's 100 Women list, which features 100 inspiring and influential women from around the world.

== Books ==
- Her most recent book is titled The Heroic Heart: Awakening Unbound Compassion. A Modern Commentary on the 37 Verses on the Practice of a Bodhisattva. Shambhala (August 16, 2022) ISBN 1645470555.
- A collection of her teachings was released as the book Into the Heart of Life by Jetsunma Tenzin Palmo, Snow Lion Publications, 2011. (ISBN 978-1-55939-374-4).
- Her life was profiled in the book Cave in the Snow by Vicki Mackenzie (ISBN 1-58234-045-5).
- Tenzin Palmo released a book containing some of her teachings: Reflections On A Mountain Lake: Teachings on Practical Buddhism (ISBN 1-55939-175-8).
- Three Teachings is a compilation of talks given by Tenzin Palmo in Singapore, in 1998. Three Teachings - Three Teachings

== See also ==
- Gelongma
- Ngagpa
- Women in Buddhism
