= Maranda, India =

Maranda Maranda, MC Palampur
- Suburb
- Location in Himachal Pradesh, India Maranda (India)
- Coordinates: 32.1167°N 76.5333°E
- Country: India
- State: Himachal Pradesh
- Region: North India
- District: Kangra
- Elevation: 1,472 m (4,829 ft)

Population (2001)
  - Total: 4,006

Languages
  - Official: Kangri language, Hindi
- Time zone: UTC+5:30 (IST)
- PIN: 176102
- Literacy: 78%%
- Climate: ETh (Köppen)
- Avg. summer temperature: 34 °C (93 °F)
- Avg. winter temperature: −4 °C (25 °F)

Maranda is a suburb in Palampur City on the Kangra district in Indian state of Himachal Pradesh, India. Dharamshala is the administrative headquarters of the Kangra district.

Maranda is a suburb in Palampur which is a green hill station and a municipal Corporation in the Kangra Valley in the Indian state of Himachal Pradesh. It is surrounded on all sides by tea gardens and pine forests which merge with the Dhauladhar ranges. Palampur is the tea capital of northwest India but tea is just one aspect that makes Palampur a special interest place. Abundance of water and proximity to the mountains has endowed it with a mild climate. The village has a railway station to hill station Palampur. The railway line is connected using narrow gauge tracks from Pathankot to Jogindernagar. Maranda is also known locally for a renowned Rotary eye hospital in the region.

== See also ==
- Palampur
- Kangra Valley
- Kangra district
