= Jalari =

- Village
- Interactive map of Jalari
- Country: India
- State: Himachal Pradesh
- District: Hamirpur
- Time zone: UTC+5:30 (IST)
- PIN: 177 042

Jalari is one of the villages in Nadaun of Hamirpur, India.

== Geography ==
Jalari is located 3.3 km from its Mandal main town Nadaun. Jalari is 22.7 km from its District Main City Hamirpur. It is 106 km from its State Main City Shimla.

Nearby villages are Bela (2.7 km), Nadaun (3.3 km), Lahar Kotlu (3.4 km), Bhumpal (3.4 km), Karaur (4 km). Nearest towns are Nadaun (3.3 km), Tira Sujanpur (15.4 km), Hamirpur (22.7 km), Bamson (23.1 km). Amlehar, Badaran, Badhera, Balduhak, Bara, Basaral are the villages along with village in the same Nadaun Mandal

Postal Pin is '177042' and other villages in Post Office (177042) are Batran, Ghaloon, Jalari, Batrahan, and Maloonda.

== Education ==
=== Schools near by Jalari ===
1. KOTLA-KALLAR
2. GMS CHILLIAN
3. Bhagvati Public School, Jalari
4. Govt. Senior Secondary School

=== Graduate Colleges near by Jalari ===
1. DAWARKA DASS MEMORIAL Sai College of Education
2. SHRI SAI COLLEGE OF EDUCATION
3. Sidharth Government Degree College Nadaun, Himachal Pradesh.
