= Indu Goswami =

Indian politician (born 1967)

Indu Bala Goswami

Member of Parliament, Rajya Sabha
- In office 10 April 2020 – 9 April 2026
- Preceded by: Viplove Thakur
- Succeeded by: Anurag Sharma
- Constituency: Himachal Pradesh

Personal details
- Born: 12 April 1967 (age 59) Palampur, Himachal Pradesh, India
- Party: Bharatiya Janata Party
- Children: 1
- Education: Himachal Pradesh University

Indu Bala Goswami (born 12 April 1967) is an Indian politician and a former state President of the Bharatiya Janata Party (BJP) of Himachal Pradesh. She was a Member of Parliament in the Rajya Sabha, the upper house of the Indian Parliament, from Himachal Pradesh. She was formerly chairperson of the State Women Commission Himachal Pradesh and State Social Welfare Board Himachal Pradesh.

== Political career ==
Indu Goswami joined the BJP in 1988, and worked for the party throughout the 1990s, including with future Prime Minister Narendra Modi in the late 1980s as the vice-president of the Bharatiya Janata Yuva Morcha, the youth wing of the BJP.

Goswami unsuccessfully contested the 2017 Himachal Pradesh Legislative Assembly election from Palampur against Congress’ Ashish Butail.

In 2020, she was elected unopposed to the Rajya Sabha from Himachal Pradesh on the BJP ticket.
