= Kunj Behari Lal Butail =

Kunj Behari Lal Butail (KBL Butail)

President, Himachal Pradesh Congress Committee

Member, Himachal Pradesh Legislative Assembly

Personal details
- Born: 2 April 1933 Pragpur, Kangra district, Punjab Province (British India)
- Died: 15 September 2006 (aged 73)
- Party: Indian National Congress
- Spouse: Sudesh Butail
- Relations: Brij Behari Lal Butail (Brother)
- Children: 3 daughters & 1 son
- Occupation: Politician, Agriculturalist and Social Activist

Kunj Behari Lal Butail (or KBL Butail, Hindi: कुंज बेहारी लाल बुटेल; 2 April 1933 – 15 September 2006) was an Indian National Congress leader, and a leading tea grower from Palampur, Kangra, Himachal Pradesh.

== Personal life ==
Butail was born on 2 April 1933 in Palampur, Kangra district. He was married to Sudesh Butail and they have one son and three daughters. His grandson, Gokul Butail is Principal Advisor to Chief Minister, HP and also Joint Secretary of Indian National Congress.

== Political life ==
He represented the constituency of Palampur three times in the state assembly from 1966 to 1980. He was also the first President of the Pradesh Congress Committee, when the state was formed.

Butail was regarded as one of the masterminds in the state congress who gave new dimensions to the development of district Kangra. He was regarded as one of the arch rivals of his own Chief Minister Yashwant Singh Parmar whom he accused of discrimination for the merged areas of state. He was offered Cabinet rank by Dr. Parmar but he refused to accept it. Butail was also said to have cordial relations with the central leaders of the INC like Indira Gandhi. Leaders like Mahatma Gandhi, Pandit Nehru, Sardar Patel visited his house many times owing to the closeness to his Uncle Kanhiya Lal Butail.

His younger brother Brij Behari Lal Butail has been a 5 time MLA from Palampur and is the current Speaker of the State Assembly. Presently his son is the sitting MLA from Palampur representing Indian National Congress.

== Social work ==
Butail was well known for his philanthropic efforts. He founded a premier educational institution, Lala Kanhiya Lal Butail DAV college for girls, a pioneer institution that primarily serves the poor and under-privileged girls of the society. Bansi Lal Butail Girls School, another charitable educational institution established for the benefit of young girls of Palampur area was started by Butail. No fees are charged to the students-moreover most of their expenses like transportation and books are also taken care of by the school itself. Butail managed and ran two big charitable trusts, Lala Gorimal Butail Trust and Bundla Tea Estate trust, which donated prime lands of Palampur, Pragpur and Shimla to hospitals, schools and temples. Butail was instrumental in donating about 20000 square metres of prime land in Palampur to set up DAV Public School at Palampur, which today is one of the leading schools in the district. He also played a vital role in setting up the Tea Cooperative factories at Palampur and adjoining areas.
