= Ghaloon =

- Village
- Interactive map of Ghaloon
- Country: India
- State: Himachal Pradesh
- District: Hamirpur
- Time zone: UTC+5:30 (IST)
- Pin Code: 177042

Ghalöön is a village in Nadaun tehsil of the Hamirpur district in the Indian state of Himachal Pradesh.

== Geography ==
Ghalöön is located about 8 kilometres from Nadaun city and to the side of Deotsidh (Baba Balak Nath). It covers roughly 11 square kilometres.

== Demographics ==
This village has a population of fewer than 1,000 people.

== Politics ==
It has an elected village panchayat (council).
