= Pragpur =

- Village
- Location in Himachal Pradesh, India Pragpur (India)
- Coordinates: 31.67°N 76.07°E
- Country: India
- State: Himachal Pradesh
- District: Kangra
- Elevation: 650 m (2,130 ft)

Population (2011)
  - Total: 502

Languages
  - Official: Hindi, Pahari
- Time zone: UTC+5:30 (IST)

Pragpur is a heritage village in Kangra district of Himachal Pradesh. One can reach Pragpur by train up to Una (UHL) then by NH 503, NH 3 and MDR 46 road, nearest airports are Bhuntar Airport (IATA: UAA) and Gaggal Airport (IATA: DHM, ICAO: VIGG).

== History ==
Pragpur is said to have been founded in the late 16th century by the Patials. The area of Pragpur was part of the principality of Jaswan.

Pragpur is an ornamental village with unchanged shops, cobblestone streets, old water tanks, mud-plastered walls and slate-roofed houses. The narrow streets, lined with fort-like houses, havelis and villas, are indicative of the area's aged charisma. Due to its unique architecture and pristine beauty, the state government of Himachal Pradesh declared Pragpur as the country's first Heritage Village in December 1997.

The village is situated at the confluence of two 'khads' (seasonal water channel ) the Sehri khad and the Lag-Baliana khad which meet at Nakki. The two then become Nakki khad. Hence it was called Pryagpur (pryag means the place where two water courses meet) which then became Pragpur. A 100-year old document in Sanskrit exists in which the principal of Oriental College, Lahore refers to the village as प्रयागपुर (Pryagpur). Since long the Lag-Baliana khad has been the source of water supply to Pragpur while the Sehri khad becoming source of water for Garli and villages like Bani and Muhin. The Nakki khad, dry today, must have carried plenty of water before it was diverted for human use when the settlements came up about three hundred years ago. Water mills also existed in Baliana.

According to available records the Post and Telegraph Department established the Pragpur post office on 18 February 1931.

Today the name Pragpur is being changed to Paragpur (परागपुर). The story of a princess, Parag Dei, after whom the village is supposed to have been named, lacks evidence as no one has come up even with the name of Parag Dei's father.

Along with Pragpur, the nearby village of Garli is a part of the Heritage Zone. The Judges Court is a resort built in a typical Anglo-Indian style of architecture. It stands in 12 acres of greens, and is just a short walk from the village core and the Taal. Apart from the Judges Court, which was built in 1918, Mr Lal has restored his 300-year-old ancestral house.

== Places of interest ==
The places of interest within the Heritage Village Pragpur are the Lala Rerumal Haveli built in 1931 by a Rais of Pragpur, which has a Mughal style garden, pleasure terrace and a large water reservoir. Butail Mandir, Chaujjar Mansion, courtyards of the Sood Clans, an ancient Shakti Mandir and atiyalas or public platforms are the pride of this heritage village. There are many silversmiths in the market selling traditional trinkets and curios. The village is known for its cottage industry. The inhabitants in the area are mostly craftspeople, weavers, basket makers, silversmiths, painters, musicians and tailors. One can purchase hand-woven blankets, shawls and hand-block printed clothes.

- Dera Gopipur: a small town near Pragpur
- Sidh Chaano Temple: a famous pilgrimage place in Pragpur.
- Chhinmastika Dham: also known as Chintapurani Mata Mandir; a famous religious place; 27 km from Pragpur
- Sri Jwalamukhi Devi Temple: this temple is a famous religious place, 23 km from Pragpur
- Nearby markets: Garli, Dhalihara, Neharan Pukhar
- Kaleshwar Mahadev Temple is located on the banks of the River Beas, about 16 kilometers away from the city of Pragpur in Kangra.
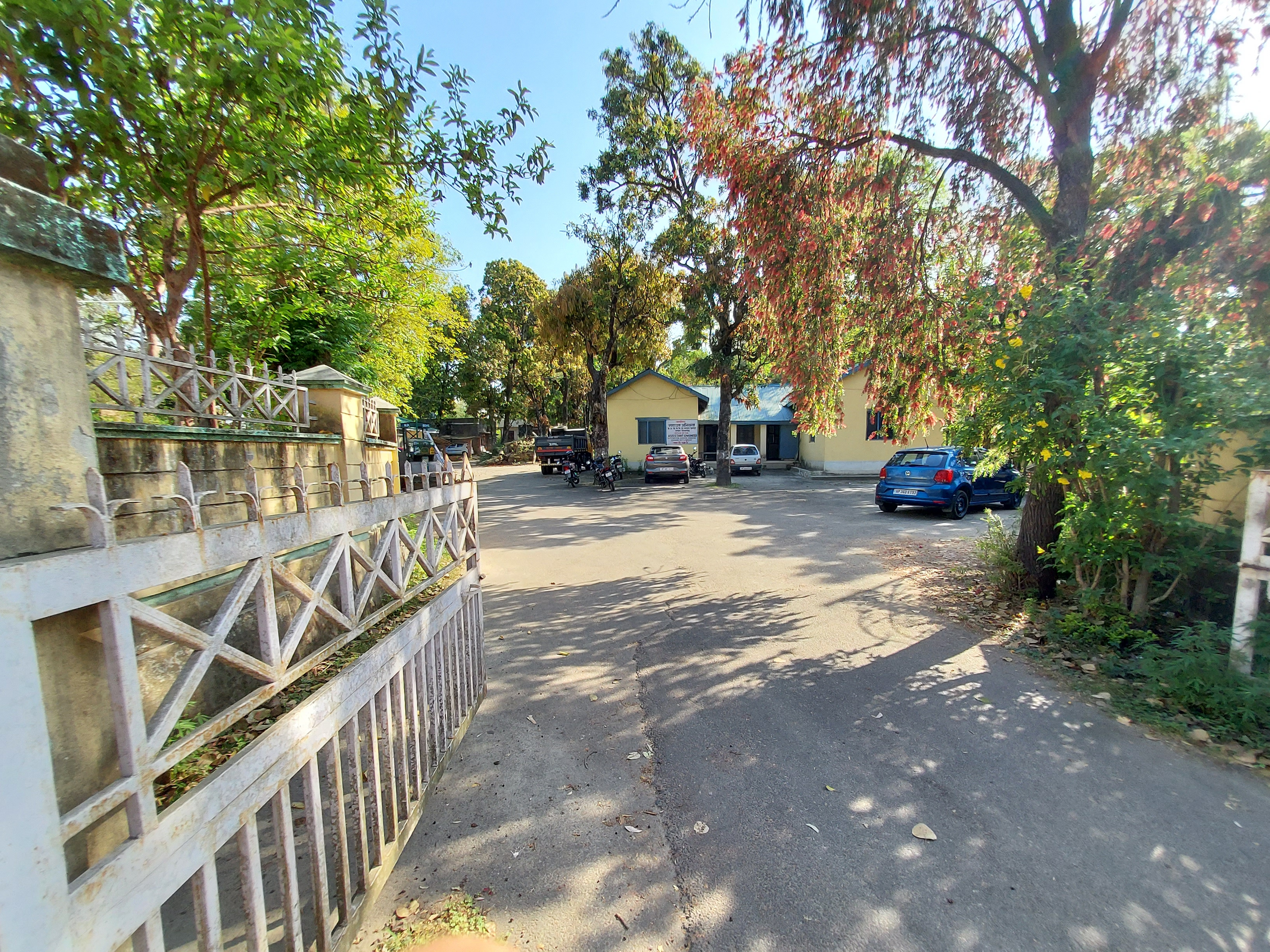
  Office of Assistant Engineer, HP PWD, Pragpur

== Climate ==
- Spring: about mid-February to mid-April; the winter starts losing its bite around mid-February
- Summer: mid-April to end of June; it is hot in summer and light cottons are recommended
- Rainy season: July to September; still quite warm and humid; much rain
- Autumn: October to November; days are pleasantly warm; nights are cool; one may need light woollens at night or early mornings
- Winter: December-January; it is quite pleasant during the day and one may get by with one layer of woollens; the winter nights are cold and an extra layer of woolens is required.

Climate data for Pragpur
Month	Jan	Feb	Mar	Apr	May	Jun	Jul	Aug	Sep	Oct	Nov	Dec	Year
Mean daily maximum °C (°F)	17.9 (64.2)	21.1 (70.0)	26.0 (78.8)	32.0 (89.6)	37.0 (98.6)	36.8 (98.2)	32.2 (90.0)	30.8 (87.4)	31.1 (88.0)	28.8 (83.8)	25.3 (77.5)	18.1 (64.6)	28.1 (82.6)
Mean daily minimum °C (°F)	4.1 (39.4)	6.3 (43.3)	13.4 (56.1)	17.5 (63.5)	22.2 (72.0)	24.4 (75.9)	24.0 (75.2)	18.3 (64.9)	17.8 (64.0)	11.0 (51.8)	09.5 (49.1)	5.0 (41.0)	14.5 (58.0)
Source: World Meteorological Organisation

== Transport ==
Pragpur is well connected by air, rail and road. Kangra Airport

is the nearest airport, around 55 km away. Pathankot is another airport, about 100 km away.

By train, it is connected by the narrow gauge Kangra Railway, which starts at Pathankot.

The nearest rail hubs are Guler or Ranital, both about 20 km away.

By bus, it is 6 km from Kaloha on National Highway 70, connecting Amb to Hamirpur.

Pragpur is well connected with all the advanced communication networks. BSNL and all other network companies have their network here. Nationalize banks and India post have their branches here. Many local administrative offices also situated here.
