= Brij Behari Lal Butail =

Indian politician from Palampur

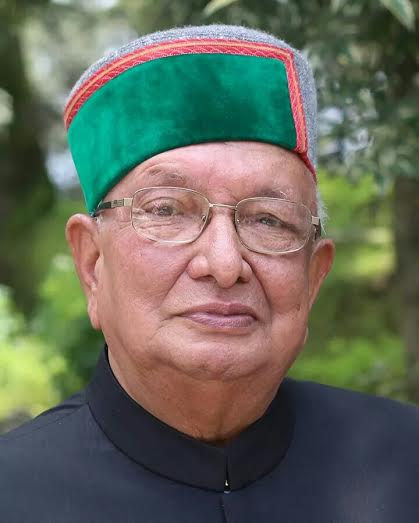

12th Speaker of Himachal Pradesh Assembly
- In office 9 January 2013 – 10 January 2018
- Preceded by: Tulsi Ram
- Succeeded by: Rajeev Bindal

Political Adviser to Chief Minister
- In office January 2005 – December 2007

Revenue Minister
- In office 6 March 2003 – 5 July 2005
- Succeeded by: Sat Mahajan

Chief Parliamentary Secretary
- In office 10 October 1995 – March 1998

Member of Legislative Assembly
- In office January 2013 – January 2018
- Preceded by: Parveen Sharma
- Succeeded by: Ashish Butail
- Constituency: Palampur
- In office 1993–2008
- Preceded by: Dr. Shiv Kumar
- Succeeded by: Parveen Sharma
- Constituency: Palampur
- In office 1985–1990
- Preceded by: Ch. Sharavan Kumar
- Succeeded by: Dr. Shiv Kumar
- Constituency: Palampur

Personal details
- Born: 25 July 1941 (age 85) Palampur, Punjab Province, British India
- Party: Indian National Congress
- Spouse: Beena Butail
- Relations: Lala Kanhiya Lal Butail (Grandfather); Kunj Behari Lal Butail (Brother)
- Children: 3 daughters & 1 son
- Official residence: Annadale View, Shimla
- Alma mater: University of Delhi (L.L.B.) & D.A.V. College, Jalandhar (B.A.)
- Profession: Politician, Tea Planter and Horticulturist

Brij Behari Lal Butail (or BBL Butail) is an Indian politician from Palampur. He was MLA of Palampur and he was the 12th Speaker of Himachal Pradesh Legislative Assembly. He retired from politics in 2017 and his son Ashish Butail was elected as MLA of Palampur in January 2018.

== Early life and education ==
He was born on 25 July 1941 to Lala Bansi Lal Butail and Smt. Satyavati Butail in Bundla, Palampur. Butails have contributed to the politics of Palampur since the Independence. His father and grandfather, Lala Kanhiya Lal Butail were freedom fighters. His grandfather was also the first representative of Palampur after India's independence. After him, his elder brother Kunj Behari Lal Butail became the MLA.

He did his schooling in Palampur and later earned the degree of B.A. and L.L.B. from University of Delhi.

Butails have had cordial relations with the central leaders of the INC like Indira Gandhi and Rajiv Gandhi and current representatives like Sonia Gandhi and Rahul Gandhi.

== Politics and career ==
He was elected to State Legislative Assembly for the first time in 1985 and again in 1993, 1998, 2003 and 2012. After his victory in 2012 elections, he was unanimously elected as the Speaker of the H.P. Vidhan Sabha. He has held the post of Chief Parliamentary Secretary and had independent charge for Food & Civil supplies department. He was attached to the Chief Minister for Public Relations, Public Works and Housing Departments. He was also the Revenue Minister and Political Advisor to the Chief Minister. He retired from politics as Speaker of the H.P. Vidhan Sabha after his term ended in 2017. His son Ashish Butail succeeded him and is the current MLA from Palampur.

== Personal life ==
He married Smt. Beena Butail in 1966, and they have one son and three daughters. He played a key role in helping the Co-operative Tea Industry achieve viability and currently serves as the Chairman of the Kangra Co-operative Tea Factory in Palampur. Additionally, he is the President of KLBDAV College and the Vice-President of DAV Public School in Palampur. He was also known to be the richest legislator of Himachal Pradesh.
