= Jaisinghpur =

- Town
- Location in Himachal Pradesh, India Jaisinghpur (India)
- Coordinates: 31.898615°N 76.598931°E
- Country: India
- State: Himachal Pradesh
- District: Kangra
- Elevation: 592 m (1,942 ft)

Population (2005)
  - Total: 1,273

Languages
  - Official: Hindi
  - Native: Kangri
- Time zone: UTC+5:30 (IST)
- PIN: 176095
- Telephone code: 911894xxxxxx
- Vehicle registration: HP-56

Jaisinghpur is a small town and subdivision in Kangra district of Himachal Pradesh, India. There are two tehsils: the main tehsil is in Jaisinghpur and the sub tehsil is in Alampur. The population of Jaisinghpur is 2,602 and the overall population of Jaisinghpur subdivision is 58,623.

== Etymology ==
The town was named after Katoch, a Chandravanshi Rajput king of the princely estate of Kangra-Lambagraon, His Highness Maharaja Shri Jai Singh Katoch who established Jaisinghpur in 1813 "History of Jaisinghpur".

== Festival and fair ==
Jaisinghpur has been known as the first place in Kangra, or perhaps the entire province, for staging the Ramlila festival. Ramlila of Jaisinghpur started around 90 years ago and almost all the actors that participated were Brahmin, mainly from the Awasthi community. The uniqueness of the Ramlila was the Sanskrit language used at that time, most Ramlilas in North India are based on the 16th century Avadhi version of Ramayana, Ramcharitmanas, written by Gosvami Tulsidas entirely in verse, thus used as dialogues in most traditional versions.

Jaisinghpur is also famous for its annual fair known as Holian which is celebrated in March during Holi, the festival of colours. The Holian of Jaisinghpur is famous for its delicious Aalu Chholey and Jalebi. Holian continues for almost a week. The holding of kushti (wrestling) at Dargah during Holi is an annual affair spectated by multiple visitors.

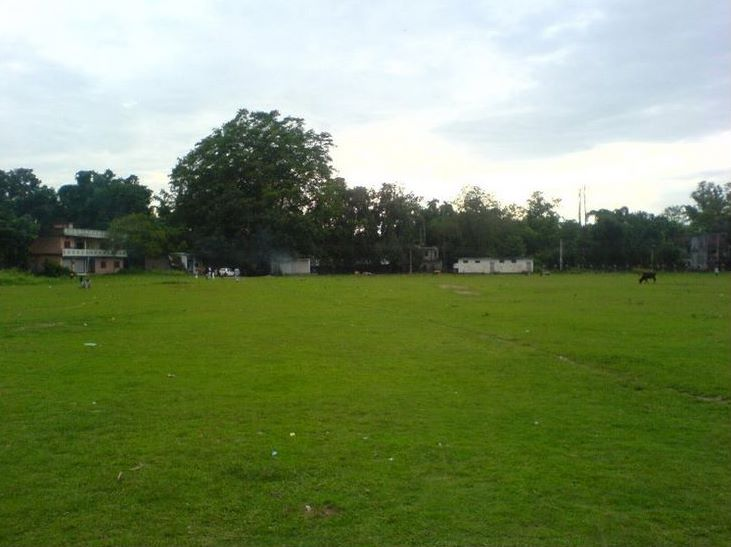
Jaisinghpur Chougan

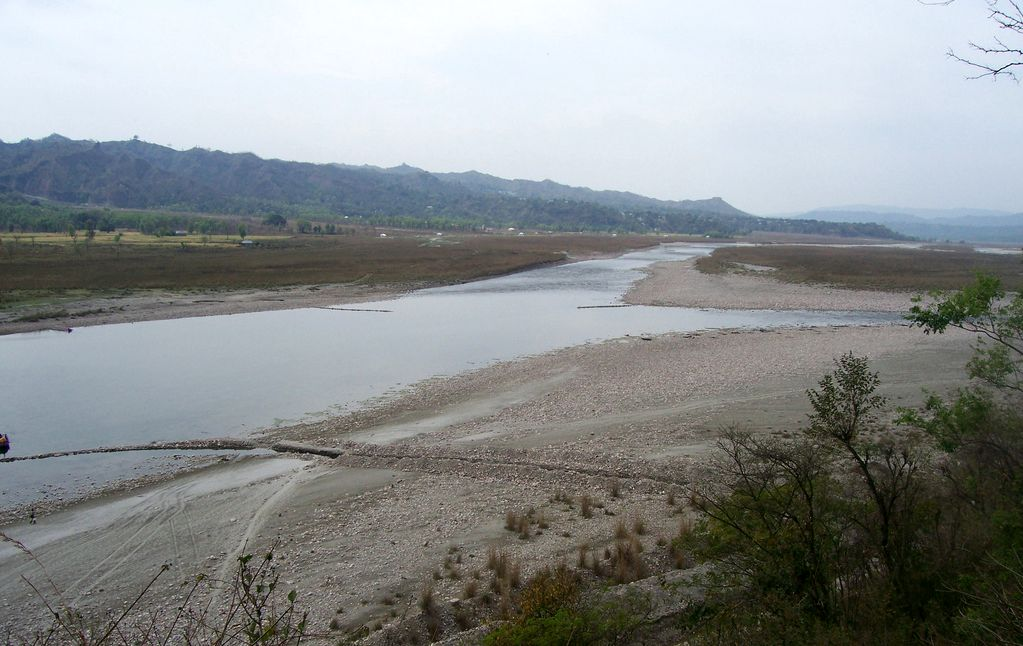
View of the river Beas from Jaisinghpur

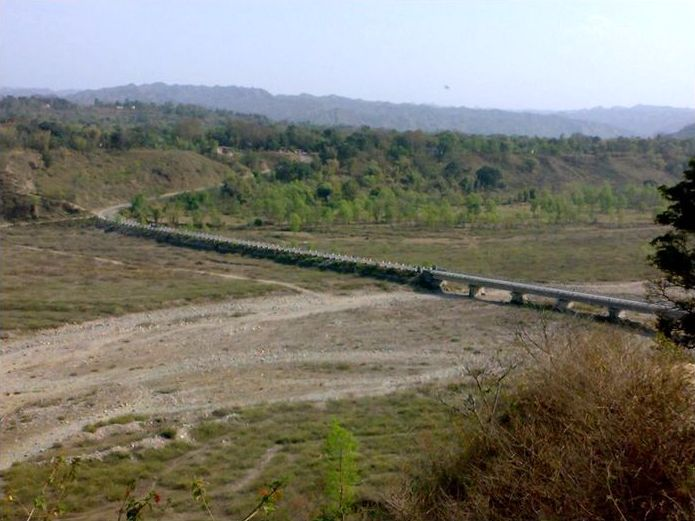
Sukad Khad bridge

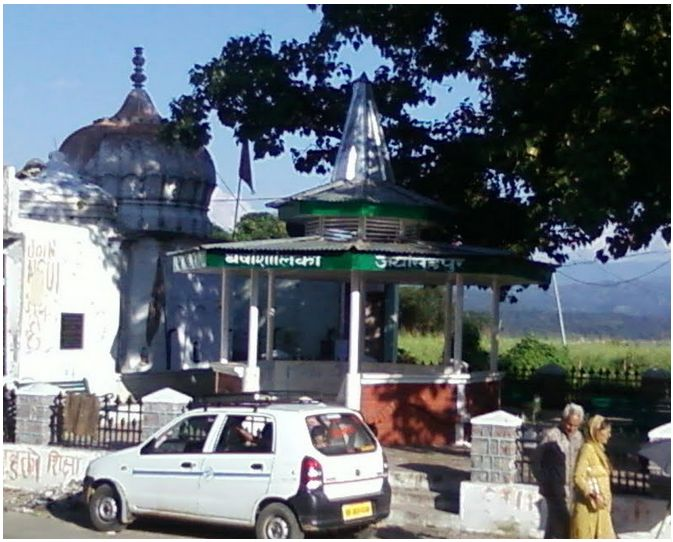
Jaisinghpur Bus Stand

== Demographics ==
According to the 2001 India census, the population of Jaisinghpur town is 1,273 and the overall population of Jaisinghpur tehsil is 58,623. This number represents 26,666 males and 31,957 females.

== Education ==
=== Schools ===
Jaisinghpur is home to The Lawrence International School, which opened in 2007.

=== Colleges ===
- Government Degree College Jaisinghpur
- The Lawrence College Jaisinghpur
- Jaggi Institute of Technology
- PR Education Point (Tinbar-Majhera) Tehsil Jaisinghpur, Kangra HP 176076

== Cities and villages in Jaisinghpur Tehsil ==
Cities and villages in Jaisinghpur Tehsil
Alampur	Amb	Ambal Tappa	Ambotu	Andrana	Anirudh	Aranda	Arath
Ashapuri	Bag Kuljan	Bagh	Baghetar	Bagrena	Bajot	Bakarag	Balah
Ban Baghetar	Ban Banjar	Ban Chambi	Bandahu Khas	Bansu	Bar	Baralu	Barla
Barram Kalan	Barram Khurd	Behru	Bhagaina	Bhaglal	Bhagun	Bhalundar	Bhati
Bhatwara	Bhaudi	Bheri Nichli	Bheri Uparli	Bhuhara	Bijapur	Bir	Chambe Da Lahr
Chambi	Chandraun	Chaunsaral Pat	Chhainti	Chhatter	Chohla	Dabla	Dadu
Dagoh Khas	Dali	Daliana	Dalu	Dandel	Daraman Khas	Daslon	Dehru
Dehru	Dhaneri	Dhar Brahmpuri	Dhar Darumka Kalan	Dhar Darumka Khurd	Dhar Lahar Langha	Dibb	Dol
Drup Kayara	Dugruhi	Gadiara	Gahli	Galehr	Gandar	Ganguhi	Garh
Ghar Chandi	Gharun	Guga	Gughrar	Guhan	Gujrera	Gulana	Gungari
Haler	Halon Kalan	Halon Khurd	Har	Har Balak Rupi	Hardon	Harsi	Inder Nagar
Jagat	Jagni Jar	Jagrup Nagar	Jaisinghpur	Jalari	Jaleht	Jamhun	Jamula
Jandera	Jangal	Jarehr	Jaryal Lahr	Jol	Julah Pat	Kachhal Bhadarian	Kachhal Jagian
Kachhehra	Kalhera	Kalhun	Kaluhi	Kamand	Karan Ghat	Karonthi	Kasehda
Kathaun	Kathla	Kelan	Khajurnun	Khalta	Kharjar	Kheri	Koal
Kohala	Koru	Kosri Khas	Kotahan	Kotlu	Kotlu Khas	Kudana	Kuhn Khas
Kuhn Uparli	Kutwalla	Lahat Khas	Lahr	Lahri	Lahru	Lanot	Liunda
Lower Lamba Graon	Luggat	Maharaj Nagar	Maila	Maiser Gujrehra	Majehar	Majhera	Malehr
Malodhan	Maniar	Manjhoti	Marera	Mashwar	Molag Jhikla	Molag Uparla	Mongal
Nagban Buhla	Nagban Uparla	Nagpuri	Nahlna	Nakthori	Netru	Nihara	Nin
Och Kalan	Och Khurd	Odri	Palat	Paleta	Pandehr	Panjlehr	Panti II Pharer
Paplah	Paprola	Parman	Pat	Ramnagar	Rana Nagar	Rirkal	Rit
Ropa	Ropri	Sadda	Sai	Sandroa	Sanghol	Santal	Sari
Saul Banehr	Shakoh	Siara	Spehr	Suan	Talwar	Tambar	Tambru
Tandar	Tarhela	Tatrola	Thanpal	Theru Buhla	Theru Uparla	Tikkar Jihan	Tikri
Tikri Ghamarrnun	Tikru	Tina Nagaitar	Trefar	Umar	Umri	Uppar Lamba Graon	Utrapur
Gopalpur (uttrapur)	Harot						

Pin Codes of Jaisinghpur
Ashapuri; 176094	Bachhwai; 176107	Balahra; 176098	Balakrupi; 176082	Bandahu (Kalhun); 176073	Barram Khurd; 176097	Bhatwan; 176098	Bheri; 176082	Dagera; 176107
Dhupkiara; 176096	Dhar Brahmpuri; 176082 II Draman; 176094	Galoti; 176107	Haler; 176091	Harrot; 176095	Harsi; 176091	Jagrup Nagar; 176082	Jaisinghpur; 176095	Jalag; 176094
Jangal; 176082	Karanghat; 176095	Khera; 176086	Kona; 176107	Kosri; 176096	Kotlu; 176096	Kuhan; 176098	Lahru; 176098	Maharajnagar; 176096
Maila; 176089	Majhoti; 176089	Marera; 176097	Molag; 176089	Nahlana; 176094	Netru; 176095	Rananagar; 176089	Sadun; 176107	Sai; 176107
Sakoh; 176082	Salan; 176107	Sanghole; 176091	Sari; 176089	Suan; 176094	Talwar; 176096	Tammber; 176095	Thural; 176107	Uttrapur; 176095
Vijaypur; 176095								
