= Palampur, Himachal Pradesh =

Town in Himachal Pradesh, India

Palampur
- Town
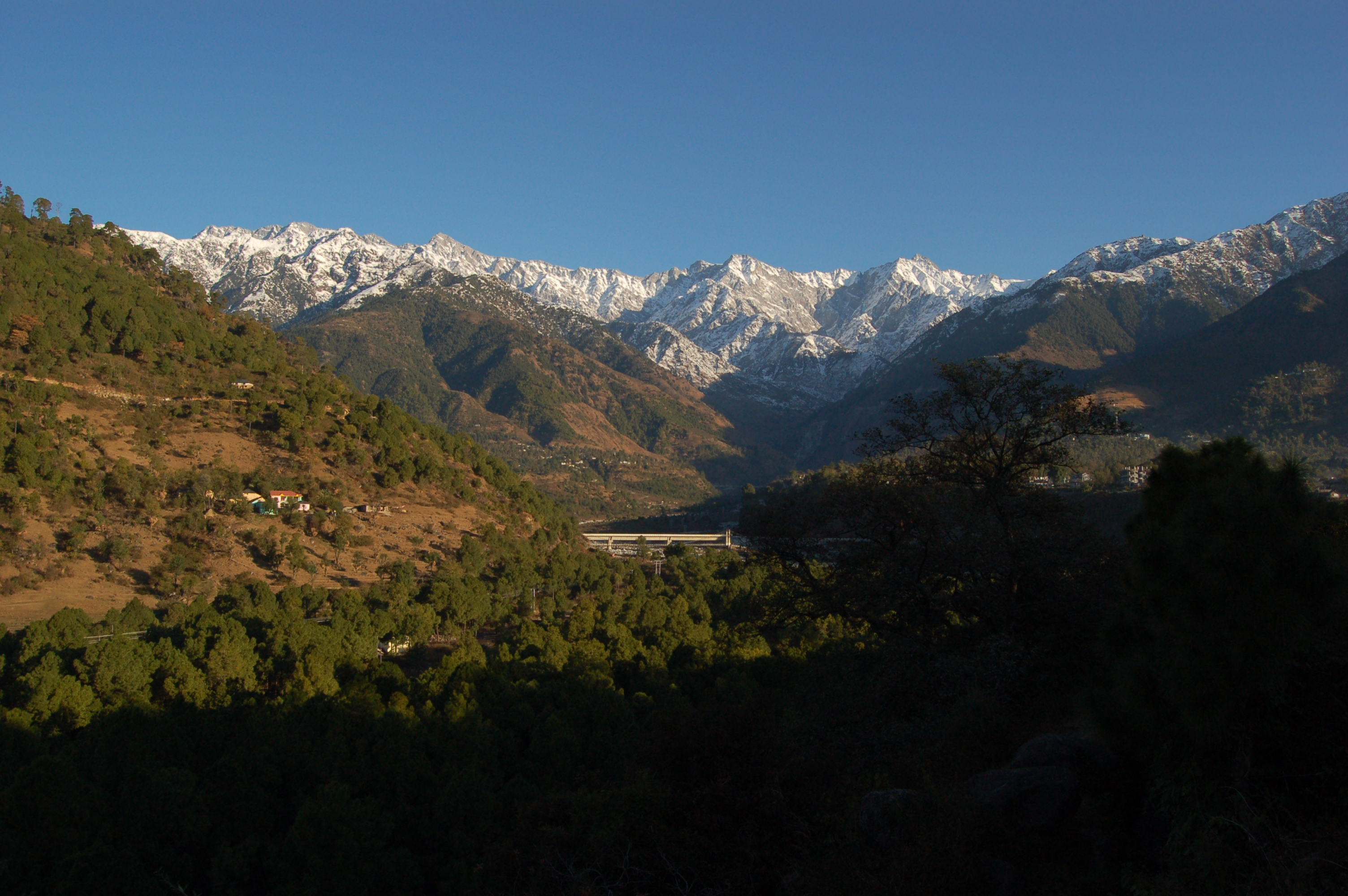
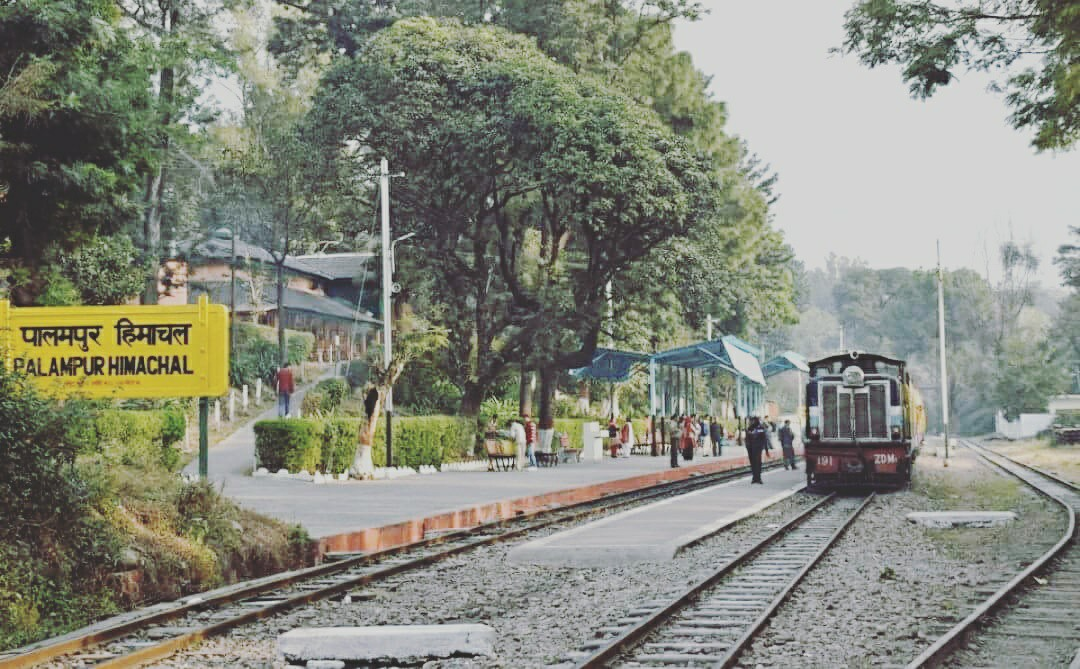
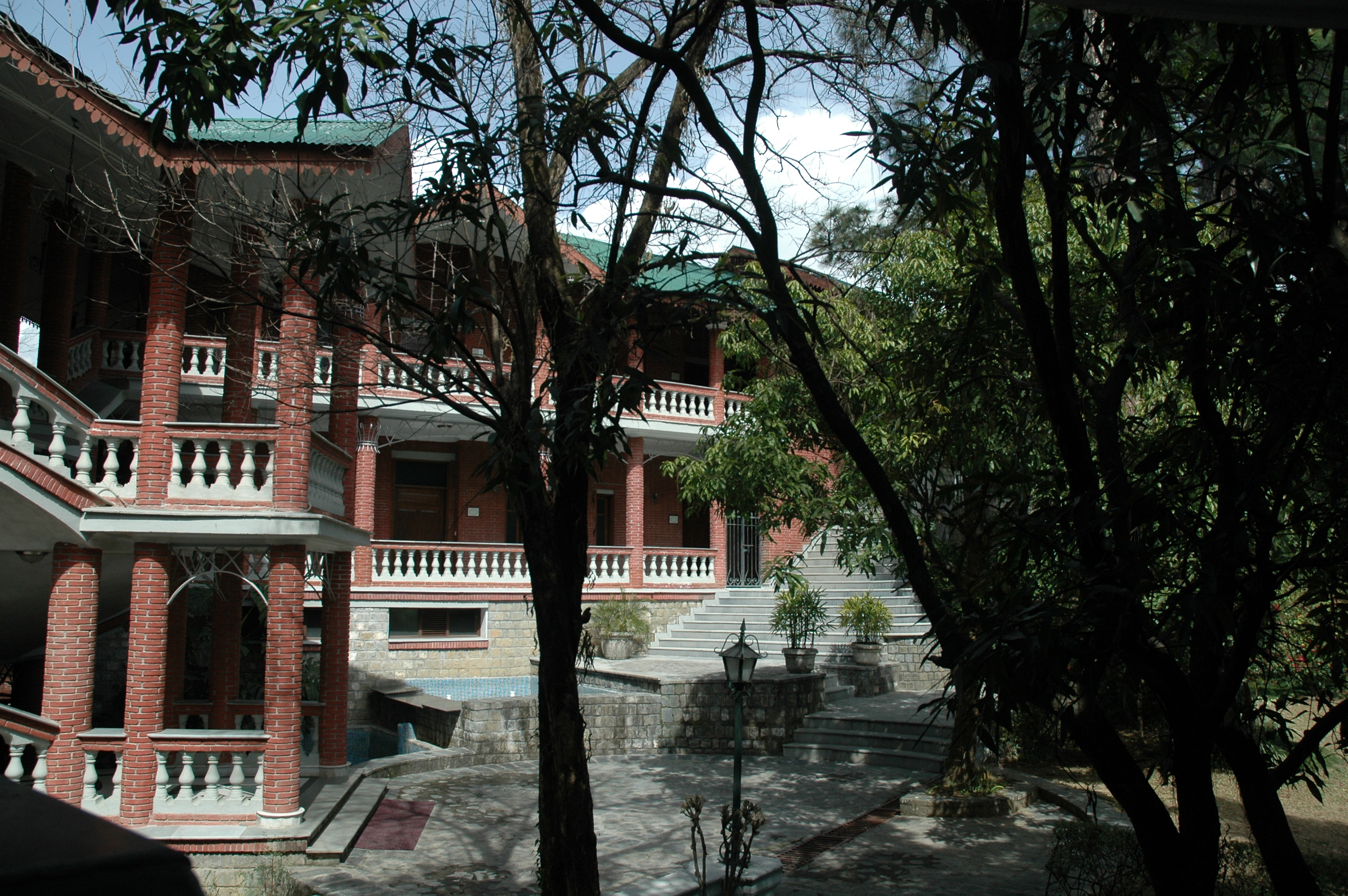
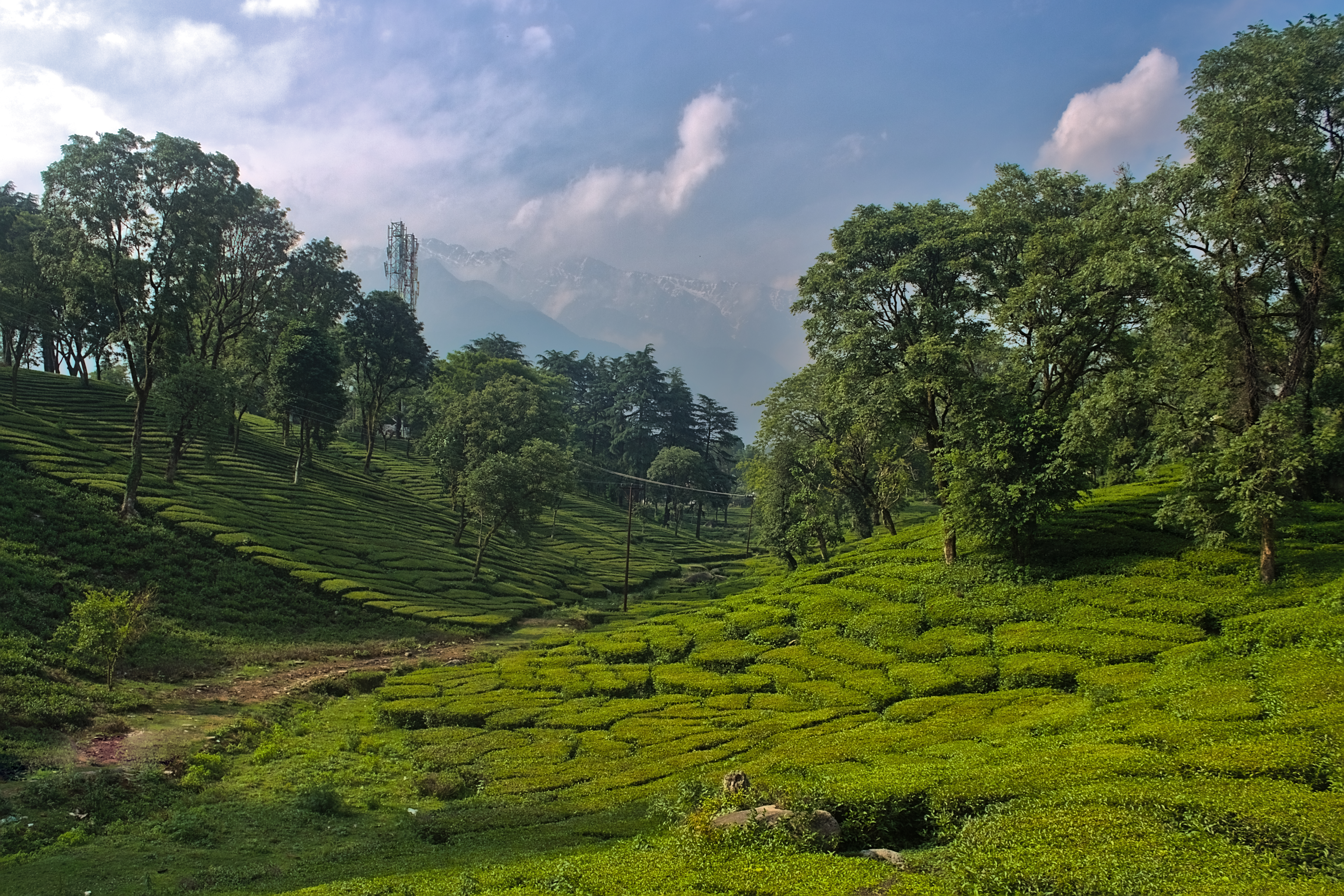
- From top, left to right: View of Dhauladhars from Palampur, Palampur Himachal railway station, Taragarh Palace, Tea Gardens of Palampur

- Location in Himachal Pradesh, India Palampur (India) Palampur (Asia)
- Coordinates: 32.109722°N 76.536641°E
- Country: India
- State: Himachal Pradesh
- District: Kangra
- Named for: Combination of 3 words: Pani, Alam, & Pur, meaning "lots of water" in local parlance
- Member of legislative Assembly: Ashish Butail

Government
  - Type: Municipal Corporation
  - Body: Municipal Corporation Palampur

Area
  - Total: 14.96 km^{2} (5.78 sq mi)
- Elevation: 1,256 m (4,121 ft)

Population (2011)
  - Total: 40,385
  - Rank: 4th in HP
  - Density: 2,700/km^{2} (6,992/sq mi)

Language
  - Official: Hindi
  - Additional official: Sanskrit
  - Regional: Kangri
- Time zone: UTC+5:30 (IST)
- PIN: 176061
- Telephone code: +91 01894
- Vehicle registration: HP-37
- Avg. annual temperature: 16.8 °C (62.2 °F)
- Avg. summer temperature: 24 °C (75 °F)
- Avg. winter temperature: 2 °C (36 °F)
- Climate: Cwa
- Website: mcpalampur.in

Palampur is a hill station and a municipal corporation situated in the Kangra District in the Indian state of Himachal Pradesh. Palampur is served by the Palampur Himachal railway station (PLMX), situated in Maranda.

== Etymology ==
The term Palampur is formed from the combination of three words—pani (water), alam (environment or 'abode of') and pur (settlement). Thus, Palampur means 'a settlement where there is plenty of rainfall'.

== History ==
The tea bush flourished in Palampur's climatic conditions, attracting mostly European tea estate owners. The expansion of tea estates, starting from the mid-19th century, led to the development of infrastructure in Palampur, including schools, colleges, and hospitals. The town also emerged as a hub for labourers involved in activities such as plucking, packing, and transporting tea leaves.

== Geography ==
Palampur is at 32.12°N 76.53°E, at a height of around 1,300 metres above sea level. It is in the northwestern region of Himachal Pradesh in north India, 213 km from the hill station of Shimla.

=== Distance from major cities ===
- Distance from Chandigarh: 233 km
- Distance from Delhi: 464 km
- Distance from Shimla: 208 km
- Distance from Pathankot: 112 km
- Distance from Mumbai : 1,834 km
- Distance from Kasauli : 212 km

=== Climate ===
Palampur has a monsoonal-influenced humid subtropical climate (Cwa) with not so hot summers and cool winters. In late summer and early spring, it receives a massive amount of monsoonal rain.

Climate data for Palampur
Month	Jan	Feb	Mar	Apr	May	Jun	Jul	Aug	Sep	Oct	Nov	Dec	Year
Mean daily maximum °C (°F)	12.8 (55.0)	14.7 (58.5)	18.1 (64.6)	24.1 (75.4)	25.7 (78.3)	25.9 (78.6)	25.2 (77.4)	24.1 (75.4)	23.3 (73.9)	23.4 (74.1)	20.6 (69.1)	14.8 (58.6)	21.1 (69.9)
Mean daily minimum °C (°F)	1.8 (35.2)	3.6 (38.5)	8.8 (47.8)	10.8 (51.4)	14.5 (58.1)	16.3 (61.3)	16.7 (62.1)	20 (68)	15.9 (60.6)	15.3 (59.5)	10.7 (51.3)	4.8 (40.6)	11.6 (52.9)
Average precipitation mm (inches)	119 (4.7)	94 (3.7)	112 (4.4)	54 (2.1)	56 (2.2)	136 (5.4)	710 (28.0)	738 (29.1)	324 (12.8)	72 (2.8)	23 (0.9)	55 (2.2)	2,493 (98.3)

== Demographics ==
As per the 2011 Indian Census, the Palampur municipality had a total population of 3,543, of which 1,814 were male and 1,729 female, and a sex ratio of 953 female to 1,000 male. The population within the age group of 0 to 6 years was 254. The Scheduled Castes and Scheduled Tribes population was 785 and 17, respectively. There were 842 households in 2011. The total number of literates in 2011 was 3,004, constituting 84.8% of the population, with a male literacy of 85.9% and a female literacy of 83.6%. The effective literacy rate of the population of Palampur age 7 and above was 91.3%, of which the male literacy rate was 93.0% and female literacy rate was 89.6%.

In 2020, after the creation of the Palampur municipal corporation, it acquired the nearby panchayats and satellite areas and the population was recounted to 40,385 after merging with the census figures of 2011.

== Government and politics ==
In 2020, after the formation of the Palampur municipal corporation, 15 wards were created by merging the nearby panchayats and satellite areas, increasing the total area to 14.96 km^{2} (5.78 sq mi) and a total population of 40,385 by combining the populations of the merged areas.

== Education and research ==
- Chaudhary Sarwan Kumar Himachal Pradesh Agricultural University
- CSIR-Institute of Himalayan Bioresource Technology

== Economy ==
Historically driven by tea production, Palampur has diversified into tourism, agriculture, and professional services. The town also serves as a commercial hub for the surrounding tea estates and the CSIR-Institute of Himalayan Bioresource Technology (IHBT).

== Notable persons ==
=== Soldiers ===
- Saurabh Kalia (1976-1999), army officer
- Siri Kanth Korla, served in the British Indian Army, and later the Indian Army
- Som Nath Sharma, recipient of Param Vir Chakra
- Sudhir Kumar Walia, recipient of Ashoka Chakra
- Vikram Batra (1974–1999), recipient of Param Vir Chakra

=== Politicians ===
- Brij Behari Lal Butail, 12th Speaker of Himachal Pradesh Legislative Assembly
- Shanta Kumar, 3rd Chief Minister of Himachal Pradesh

== See also ==
- Dongyu Gatsal Ling Nunnery
