= Sunhani, Himachal Pradesh =

Sunhani
- Village
- Location in Himachal Pradesh, India Sunhani (India)
- Coordinates: 31°24′16.398″N 76°39′56.4768″E
- Country: India
- State: Himachal Pradesh
- District: Bilaspur

Government
  - Tehsil: Jhanduta
  - Governing Body: Gram Panchayat Sunhani
  - MP: Anurag Thakur BJP
  - MLA: Jeet Ram Katwal BJP

Population (2011)
  - Total: 2,134
- Time zone: UTC+5:30 (IST)
- PIN: 174029
- Telephone code: 01978
- Vehicle registration: HP- HP-23,24,89
- Nearest cities: Bilaspur, Ghumarwin
- Climate: Hot and humid. (Köppen)
- Avg. summer temperature: 38 °C (100 °F)
- Avg. winter temperature: 2 °C (36 °F)

Sunhani is a village located in Jhanduta tehsil of Bilaspur, Himachal Pradesh, India. At the 2001 Census of India, it had a population of 2134 people and 452 families. It was the capital of the Kahlur kingdom from 1600 to 1650. Throughout history it has played an important role in the local area.

== Population ==
In the village of Sunhani, the population of children with ages 0–6 is 244 which makes up 11.43% of the total population of the village. The Average Sex Ratio of Sunhani village is 1013 which is higher than the Himachal Pradesh state average of 972. Child Sex Ratio for the Sunhani as per census is 1033, higher than Himachal Pradesh average of 909.

== Literacy ==
Sunhani village has a higher literacy rate compared to Himachal Pradesh. In 2011, the literacy rate of Sunhani village was 87.94% compared to 82.80% of Himachal Pradesh. In Sunhani Male literacy stands at 92.55% while the female literacy rate was 83.37%.

== Government ==
As per the constitution of India and the Panchyati Raaj Act, Sunhani village is administrated by Sarpanch (Head of Village) who is elected representative of the village.

== Language ==
Language : The spoken dialect of the people is Kahluri which is an off-shoot Western Pahari. Grierson calls it "Rude Punjabi" similar to that spoken in the Hoshiarpur district. The written script is "Devnagri". English and Hindi have official status.

== Location and transport ==
The nearest cities are Ghumarwin, Bilaspur and Hamirpur. The nearest railway station is also Una Railway Station, while shimla Airport is the nearest airport for the town.

The village also has a Helipad which has been used by VVIPS

== See also ==
Govind Sagar Lake and Bhakra Dam.
