= Chandel =

Chandel may refer to:

== Places ==
- Chandel, a town in Manipur, India
- Chandel district, a district in Manipur, India
- Chandel, Pernem, a village in the sub-district or taluka of Pernem, North Goa

== People ==
- Ashok Kumar Singh Chandel, Indian politician
- Pushpendra Singh Chandel, Indian politician
- Raj Bahadur Singh Chandel, Indian politician
- Suresh Chandel, Indian politician

== Other ==
- Chandel (Rajput clan), a Rajput clan in India

== See also ==
- Chanderi (disambiguation)
- Chandela Empire, a dynasty that ruled Bundelkhand (Jejakabhukti) central India
- Chandelas of Kumaun, a medieval Indian dynasty of Kumaon, India
- Chandelier (disambiguation)
- Chandeleur (disambiguation)
