= Ajnol =

Coordinates: 31.328°N 76.519°E

Ajnol Village Located in the hills of Naina Devi, Ajnol is a small village that falls under the district of Bilaspur in Himachal Pradesh. It is quite popular because of the temple of Mata Naina Devi. This temple is one of the divine power hubs or 51 Shaktipeeths. It is a holy place and sees the arrival of thousands of pilgrims throughout the year.

== Description ==
"The village of Ajnol is widely spread in the approximate area of 78.37 hectares with total 32 numbers of households. The total population (including institutional and homeless population) is 143 out of which 72 males and 71 females. In regard to the population in the age-group 0-6, it has total 13 individuals out of which 8 are males & 5 are females" as per the Census of 2011 conducted by Government of India.

== Education ==
The nearest schools here are Gsss Raghunathpura, Gsss Baddu (dadhog), Gsss Sohri, Gsss Nakrana. It is calculated that total number of literates are 106, in which 128, 57 are males and 49 are females.

== Demographic ==
Its location code is 019544 with Pin Code is 174002.

== Transportation ==
The following are the transportation available here.

By Road :- The transport bus services are available from all important cities of Punjab and Himachal Pradesh.

By Air:- The nearest airport is in Chandigarh and the distance from there is near about 100 km.

By Train:- The nearest railway station is in Anandpur Sahib and the distance from there is near about 30 km.
