= Zakatkhana =

- village
- Location in Himachal Pradesh, India Zakatkhana (India)
- Coordinates: 31.2836856°N 76.7132378°E
- Country: India
- State: Himachal Pradesh
- District: Bilaspur

Population (2009)
  - Total: 2,500
- Time zone: UTC+5:30 (IST)
- PIN: 174011
- Telephone code: 1978
- Nearest city: Swarghat
- Lok Sabha constituency: Hamirpur
- Vidhan Sabha constituency: Kot-Kahloor
- Climate: Cool (Köppen)
- Website: sappandit.blogspot.com

Zakatkhana is a village in the Bilaspur district of Himachal Pradesh, Northern India surrounded on three sides by the Govind Sagar lake, which was created by the building of the Bhakra Dam on the Sutlej River. Zakatkhana lies 8 kilometres (5.0 mi) from Swarghat.

The name derives from zakat meaning "toll tax" owing to the village's "toll tax barrier" at the time of the British Raj. Zakatkhana is on the old National Highway-21 from Bilaspur to Rupnagar in Punjab before 1954, when it was merged following construction of the Bhakhra Dam. To reach the village one can take NH 21 from Chandigarh and after travelling 100 kilometres (62 mi) from Chandigarh there is a small hill station at Swarghat.

This village is also known as land of temples as it is the location of the Sidh baba Balak nath mandir and is also home to the Rupeshwar Mahadev and Maa Sherawali temples.

Zakatkhana Pin code is 174011 and people of Zakatkhana village use Hindi language for communication.
