= Naina Devi =

Mata Naina Devi
- Town
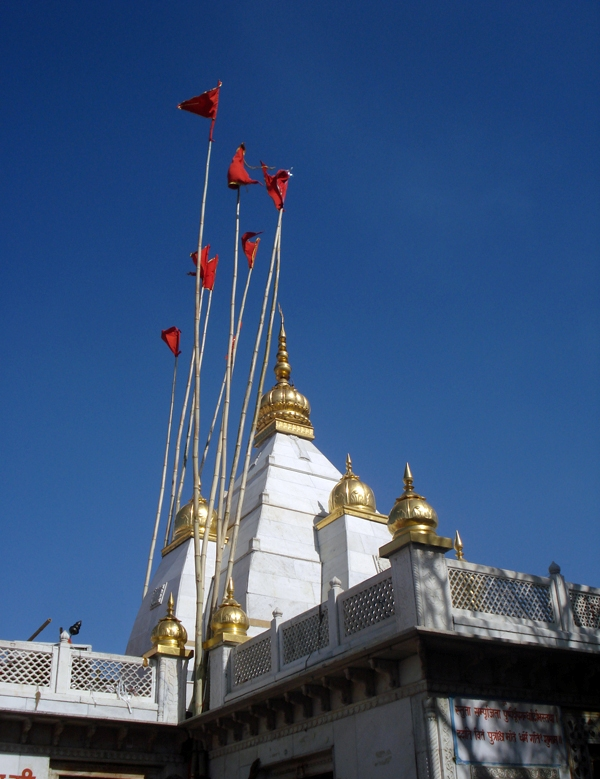
- Naina Devi Temple

- Location in Himachal Pradesh, India Mata Naina Devi (India)
- Coordinates: 31.3060277°N 76.5363944°E
- Country: India
- State: Himachal Pradesh
- District: Bilaspur

Population (2011)
  - Total: 1,204

Languages
  - Official: Hindi
  - Regional: Bilaspuri
- Time zone: UTC+5:30 (IST)

Mata Naina Devi is a town and a municipal council in Bilaspur district in the Indian state of Himachal Pradesh.

== History ==
In the Devi Bhagavata Purana, Dakṣa’s daughter Sati , unable to endure the abuse directed at her husband Shiva during Dakṣa’s sacrifice, voluntarily abandons her body in the sacrificial fire, plunging Śiva into overwhelming grief. Carrying Satī’s corpse on his shoulder, Shiva wanders the worlds in a state of furious madness and begins the tandava, threatening destruction, which alarms the assembled deities. To restore order, Vishnu uses his weapons to cut Satī’s body into 108 parts, wherever these parts fall, sacred Shakti pithas arise, each associated with a particular form of the Goddess. Shri Naina Devi Temple is the place where Right eye of Goddess Sati fell down.

After this, Naina Devi temple was lost due to some disaster, then this temple was found by a Gurjar Boy belongs to the Gurjar community. Once he was grazing his cattle and observed that a white cow is showering milk from her udders on a stone. He saw the same thing for next several days. One night while sleeping, he saw Goddess in her dreams who told him that the stone is her pindi. Naina told about the entire situation and his dream to Raja Bir Chand. When Raja saw it happening in reality, he built a temple on that spot and named the temple after Naina's name.

Shri Naina Devi Temple is also known as Mahishapeeth because of defeat of demon Mahishasur by the Goddess. According to the legends, Mahishasur was a powerful demon who was blessed by the boon of immortality by Lord Brahma, but the condition was that he could be defeated only by an unmarried woman. Due to this boon, Mahishasur started spreading terror on Earth and Gods. To cope with the demon, all Gods combined their powers and created a Devi to defeat him. The Devi was gifted different types of weapons by all Gods. When Mahishasur got mesmerized by the immense beauty of Devi and proposed her to marry him. Devi told him that she will marry him if he would overpower her. During the battle, Devi defeated the demon and took out both his eyes. This urged Gods to happily applaud "Jai Naina" and hence the name.

For many years, the Nai (Kulin Brahmin) has served as the official priests of Naina Devi Temple.

== Temple ==
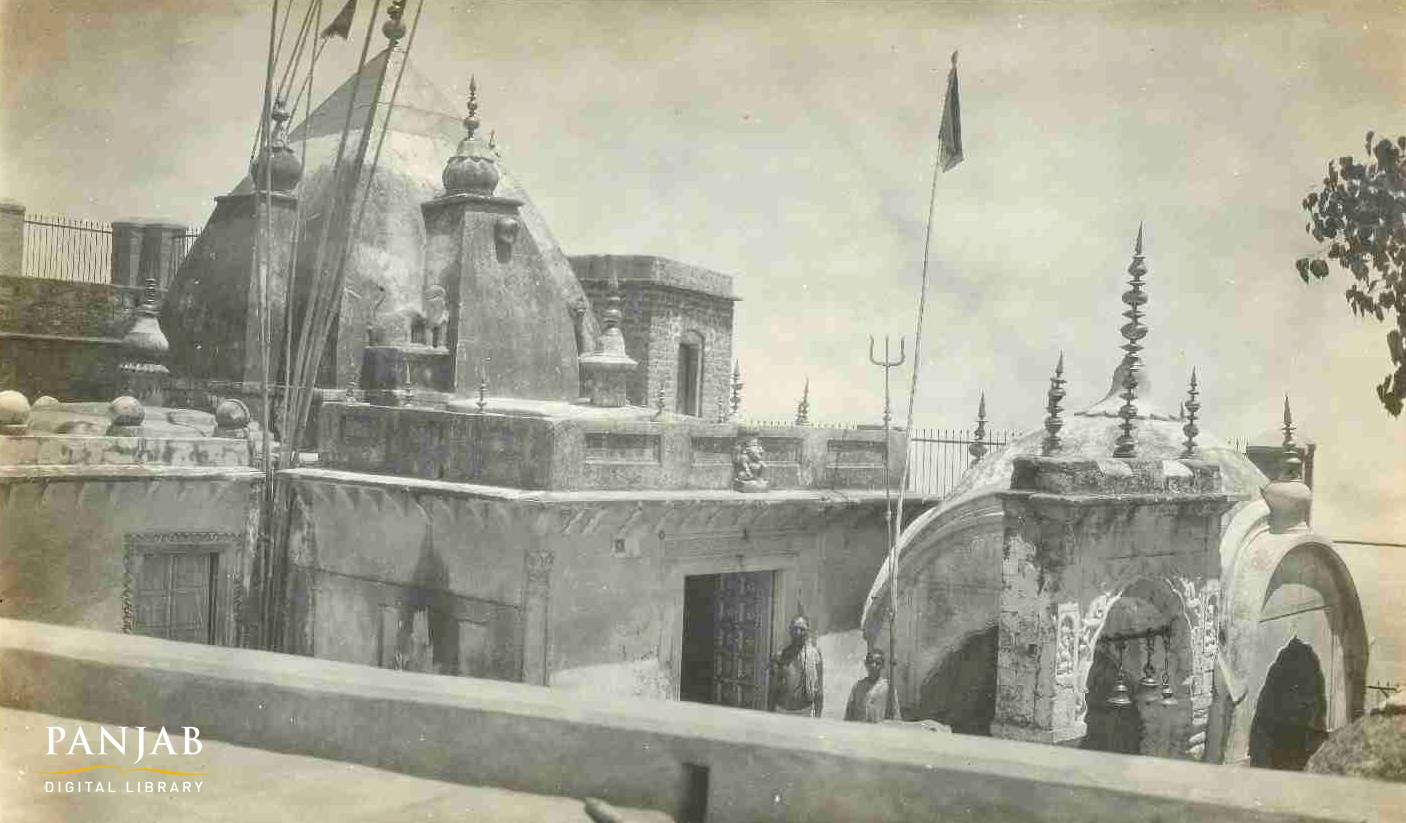
Photograph of the Naina Devi temple of Bilaspur, taken by Dhanna Singh Chahal 'Patialvi', 1934

The Temple of Shri Naina Devi Ji is situated on a hilltop, base of which also has samadhi of bhagat Jeona Morh who died in the early 20th century, in the Bilaspur District, Himachal Pradesh, India. The temple is connected with National Highway No. 21. The temple at the top of the hill can be reached via road (that curves round the hill up to a certain point) and then by concrete steps (that finally reach the top). There is also a cable car facility that moves pilgrims from the base of the hill all the way to the top.

The hills of Naina Devi overlook the Gobind Sagar lake. The lake was created by the Bhakra-Nangal Dam.

Several stories are associated with the establishment of the temple.

== The 2008 stampede ==
Sunday, 3 August 2008, proved to be catastrophic day for this temple as at least 123 people died (many of them women and children). There are conflicting reports about the cause of these deaths. One report states that they were due to people falling down the cliff after the guard railing broke. Another report claims that they were due to rumors of a fight at the temple causing panic. And another states it was due to police who hit the fleeing worshippers with canes to get them to continue moving.

This happened in the holy month of Sawan, and the Temple's being a Shakta pitha (place of strength) meant that there were as many as 3000 devotees present. According to the Times Online, 50,000 people were expected to attend Naina Devi during the day of the stampede, as part of Navaratri (a nine-day festival) which had just started.

According to Daljit Singh Manhas, a senior police officer from the area, at least 40 of the victims were children.

The Chief Minister of Himachal Pradesh announced a compensation of Rs.100,000 for those who died, Rs. 50,000 for those seriously injured and Rs. 25,000 for those with minor injuries.

== Demographics ==
As of the 2001 India census, Naina Devi had a population of 1161. Males constitute 63% of the population and females 37%. Naina Devi has an average literacy rate of 81%, higher than the national average of 59.5%; male literacy is 84%, and female literacy is 75%. In Naina Devi, 11% of the population is under 6 years of age.

== See also ==
- Naina Devi Wildlife Sanctuary
