= List of largest reservoirs in India =

Map of the major rivers, lakes and reservoirs in India

This is a list of largest reservoirs in India, including all artificial lakes with a capacity greater or equal to 1,000,000 acre-feet (1.2 km^{3}). In terms of number of dams, India ranks third after China, and USA. However per capita storage in India is only 225 cubic metres, which is far less compared to China(1,200 cubic metres),” Currently there are 7,216 completed large dams and 447 are under construction. In India most of the dams are maintained by the State Governments while there are a few other organizations, namely, Bhakra Beas Management Board (BBMB), Damodar Valley Corporation (DVC) and National Hydro Electric Power Corporation (NHPC) who also now own and operate dams.

== List ==
State / UT	River	Dam	Height	Length	Type	Storage capacity	Reservoir area	Complete
Uttar Pradesh	Rihand River	Rihand Dam (Govind Ballabh Pant Sagar)	91.44 m (300 ft)	934.45 m (3,066 ft)	Concrete Gravity	10.6 km^{3} - 374.34 TMC	450 km^{2}	1962
Kerala	Periyar River	Idukki Dam	168.91 m (554 ft)	365.85 m (1200 ft)	Double curvature Arch	1.996 km^{3} - 70.49 TMC (1,618,184 acre⋅ft)	649.3 km^{2} (251 sq mi)	1973
Maharashtra	Godavari	Jayakwadi Dam (Nath Sagar)	41.30 m (135 ft)	9,998 m (32,802 ft)	Earth-fill & Gravity	2.909 km^{3} (2,358,365 acre⋅ft) 102.73 TMC	217.50 km^{2} (53,745 acres)	1976
Maharashtra	Bhima river	Ujjani Dam (Yashwant Sagar)	54.4 m (178 ft)	2,534 m (8,314 ft)	Earth-fill & Gravity	3.14 km^{3} (2,545,639 acre⋅ft) 110.89 TMC	337 km^{2} (83,275 acres)	1980
Maharashtra	Koyna River	Koyna Dam (Shivasagar)	103.2 m (339 ft)	807.2 m (2,648 ft)	Gravity	2.981 km^{3} (2,416,736 acre⋅ft) 105.27 TMC	891.78 km^{2} (220,364 acres)	1964
Madhya Pradesh	Narmada	Indira Sagar	92 m (302 ft)	653 m (2,142 ft)	Earth-fill & Gravity	12.2 km^{3} (9,890,701 acre⋅ft) 430.84 TMC	950 km^{2} (235k acres)	2005
Telangana	Godavari	Sriram Sagar	43 m (141 ft)	15.6 km (51,181 ft)	Earth-fill & Gravity	3.172 km^{3} (2,571,582 acre⋅ft) 112.02 TMC	450.82 km^{2} (111,400 acres)	1977
Andhra Pradesh and Telangana	Krishna	Nagarjuna Sagar	124.66 m (409 ft)	4,865 m (15,961 ft)	Earth-fill & Gravity	11.561 km^{3} (9,372,655 acre⋅ft) 408.27 TMC	284.9 km^{2} (70,400 acres)	1960
Andhra Pradesh and Telangana	Krishna	Srisailam Dam (Neelam Sanjeevareddy Sagar)	145 m (476 ft)	512 m (1,680 ft)	Earth-fill & Gravity	8.722 km^{3} (7,071,040 acre⋅ft) 308.01 TMC	616.42 km^{2} (152,321 acres)	1984
Andhra Pradesh	Pennar	Somasila	39 m (128 ft)	760 m (2,493 ft)	Earth-fill & Gravity	2.20862 km^{3} (1,790,557 acre⋅ft) 78 TMC	212.28 km^{2} (52,456 acres)	1989
Himachal Pradesh	Sutlej	Bhakra Dam (Gobind Sagar)	226 m (741 ft)	518 m (1,699 ft)	Earth-fill & Gravity	9.62 km^{3} (7,799,061 acre⋅ft) 339.73 TMC	168.35 km^{2} (41,600 acres)	1963
Himachal Pradesh	Beas	Pong Dam (Maharana Pratap Sagar)	133 metres (436 ft)	1,951 metres (6,401 ft)	Earth-fill and Embankment	8.57 km^{3} (6,947,812 acre⋅ft)	260 km^{2} (64,247 acres)	1974
Odisha	Mahanadi River	Hirakud Dam	60.96 m (200 ft)	25.8 km (84,646 ft)	Earth-fill & Gravity	5.896 km^{3} (4,779,965 acre⋅ft) 208.22 TMC	834.00 km^{2} (206,086 acres)	1957
Madhya Pradesh	Sone River	Bansagar Dam	66.00 m (217 ft)	5 km (16,404 ft)	Earth-fill & Gravity	5.84 km^{3} (4,734,565 acre⋅ft) 208.22 TMC	186.48 km^{2} (46,080 acres)	2006
Tamil Nadu	River Kaveri	Mettur Dam	65 m (213.2 ft)	1,700 metres (5,600 ft)	Masonry Gravity Dam	2.64 km^{3} - 93.23 TMC (2,140,286 acre-ft)	42.5 km^{2}(10,502 acres)	1934
Gujarat	Narmada River	Sardar Sarovar Dam	138.68 m (455 ft)	1,210 m (3,970 ft)	Gravity Dam	9.5 km^{3} (7,701,775 acre⋅ft) 335.49 TMC	375.33 km^{2}	2017
Gujarat	Tapti River	Ukai Dam (Vallabh Sagar)	105.16 m (345 ft)	4,927 m (16,165 ft)	Earth-fill & Gravity	7.41 km^{3} (6,007,385 acre⋅ft) 261.68 TMC	612 km^{2} (151,228 acres)	1972
Uttarakhand	Bhagirathi River	Tehri Dam	260.5 m (855 ft)	575 m (1,886 ft)	Embankment, earth and rock-fill	4 km^{3} (3,242,853 acre⋅ft) 141.26 TMC	52 km^{2} (12,849 acres)	2006

== See also ==
- List of dams and reservoirs in India
- List of reservoirs by volume
