= Shree Rukmani Kund =

Reservoir in Himachal Pradesh, India

Rukmani Kund
- Location in Bilaspur. Himachal Pradesh, India Rukmani Kund (India)
- Coordinates: 31.363549°N 76.709935°E

Shree Rukmani Kund is a water reservoir surrounded by mountains in the middle of the Sivalik Hills Forest in Bilaspur district, Himachal Pradesh, India. Rukmani Kund, 28 km from Bilaspur, was selected in HGKK (Har Gaon Ki Kahani Programme) for the year 2012–2013.Rukmani Kund is considered the place of sacrifice of Rukmani and a Mela (fair) has been started here since some years on the name of sacrificer. A small temple has also been constructed here. It is the source of water supply for so many villages in the area.

== How to Reach ==
There is no direct bus to Rukmani Kund. If you are traveling through Bus then Auhar is last bus stop for you. If you have your personal vehicle then the road leading to the Rukmani Kund bifurcates from Bhaged Village, towards Auhar on the Shimla-Dharamshala Highway. If you want to go on foot then a path lead to Rukmani from a kilometer ahead on Auhar-Rishikesh road. If you want to continue in your personal vehicle then you have to go 3 km ahead on Auhar-Gehrwin road and there is a kuchha road of almost 2 km which takes you to the Rukmani Kund.

== History ==
The entire Auhar region was in trouble because of dearth of water despite their repeated efforts to dig a well. Once the ruler of Barsandh had a dream that in case his son or daughter in law is offered as a sacrifice, water could come out. Legend is there that a newly married young lady named Rukmani of Taredh Village married to Rundh Family, Rajput ruler of Barsandh village, was buried alive by the side of the spot which was selected for digging a Baoli (Tank). The daughter-in-law, Rukmani offered herself in preference to her husband. She sacrificed her life and the present Rukmani Kund is a result of her courageous act. It is said that she was buried alive at the place where we have this Kund today.

According to Omacanda Hāṇḍā in Buddhist Art & Antiquities of Himachal Pradesh, Up to 8th Century A.D., such stories of Woman sacrifices were common instances in which women were sacrificed to Nāga Devta for the sake of water. Similar stories can be taken into consideration like Rupi Rani of Gushal Village in Lahul Valley, Rani Nayana of Raja Sahil Varman of Chamba, Bichi of Sirmaur and Kandi Rani of Kishtwar in Jammu who were sacrificed to Nāga Devta for the sake of water. Human Sacrifices to Nāga Devta has been one of the most conspicuous features of Austric Tribes.

Grass (baggad) hanging from the walls of the Kund is considered her hair. And it is there because of the magical power of the reservoir water. People tie ribbons, bangles to the grass to offer tribute to Rukmani. It is also believed that the waters of this reservoir can cure skin ailments.

Rukmani belonged to Auhar (erstwhile Tared Village) and even today people from Rukmani's village don't drink or bathe in the Kund's waters. Such is the pride they take in their daughter's sacrifice.

== Fair ==
Baishakhi Mela is organized here annually.

== Geography ==
Rukmani Kund lies in the middle Shiwalik Hills (the Shiwalik comprises conglomerates triable micaceous sand stone, siltstone and claystone), in Bilaspur District.

== Water Supply ==
Five Gram Panchayats are being provided with water for Drinking and Irrigation purposes.

== Proposals and Reality ==
On 14 April 2000 Mr.Suresh Chandel, Ex-MP, announced that Rukmani Kund would be developed into a tourist resort. This religious place would be connected by an all-weather road. Mr. Chandel declared that not only Himachal's Tourism Department and Art and Cultural Department would collaborate for development of this centre but he would ensure sufficient Central grant from the Centre for its faster development.

On 5 February 2012, Mr. Rikhi Ram Kaundal, Vidhan Sabha Deputy Speaker announced that a sum of Rs.5 Lacs would be spent for providing tourist facilities at the famous Rukmani Kund near Auhar in Jhandutta constituency under the "Shrine Tourism" agenda of their government.

On 15 April 2013 Mr. Rajesh Dharmani, Chief Parliamentary Secretary, Forests and Fisheries, announced that Rukmani Kund shrine will be developed into a tourist spot.

But, till this date the place has not reached a condition of satisfaction. The Rukmani Kund is not given as much attention as other victim villages of the Har Gaon Ki Kahani programme. In other cases, they did construct a road, painted the walls colorful, and put on the Welcome Boards; Rukmani Kund wasn't given the same attention. The road leading to the Kund is unpaved an unmaintained.

The Tourism Department did spend handsome amount to conceptualize HGKK programme. However, they probably forgot about the Rukmani Kund.
