= Chanderi (disambiguation) =

Chanderi may refer to:

- Chanderi, a town in Ashoknagar district of Madhya Pradesh, India
  - Chanderi District, a former district of British India
  - Chanderi fort
  - Chanderi (Vidhan Sabha constituency), an assembly constituency
- Chanderi, Bhopal, a village in Bhopal district of Madhya Pradesh, India

== See also ==
- Chandel (disambiguation)
