= Morsinghi =

Village in Himachal Pradesh

- Village
- Location within Himachal Pradesh Location within India
- Coordinates: 31°29′31″N 76°42′25″E
- Country: India
- State: Himachal Pradesh
- District: Bilaspur
- Block: Ghumarwin

Population (2011)
  - Total: 149
- Time zone: UTC+5:30 (IST)
- PIN: 174026

Morsinghi is a village in Taliana panchayat, Ghumarwin block, Bilaspur district, Himachal Pradesh. It has about 32 families and a population of 149 according to the 2011 census. The PIN code of the village is 174026.

Most of the villagers depend on agriculture for their livelihood. The village has become famous as the cradle of Indian handball in the recent years. Two former national players, Sachin Chaudhari and Snehalatha Chaudhari, have started coaching girls and many of them have been selected to play for India.
