= Naina Devi Wildlife Sanctuary =

Wildlife sanctuary in Himachal Pradesh, India

- Naina Devi Himalayan Bird Conservation Reserve
- IUCN category IV (habitat/species management area)
- Location within Himachal Pradesh Location within India
- Interactive map of Naina Devi Wildlife Sanctuary
- Location: Bilaspur district and Mandi district, Himachal Pradesh, India
- Nearest city: Bilaspur
- Coordinates: 31.308°N 76.612°E
- Area: 120.72 km^{2} (46.61 sq mi)
- Established: 1962
- Governing body: Himachal Pradesh Forest Department

Naina Devi Wildlife Sanctuary is a protected area located in the Bilaspur district of Himachal Pradesh, India. Established in 1962, it spans over 123 km^{2} (47 sq mi) of forested terrain in the Shivalik range of the outer Himalayas. Its named after the Naina Devi temple.

== Description ==
The sanctuary ranges in elevation from 500 m to 1,100 m, encompassing rugged hills and deep valleys dominated by sal and chir pine forests.

== Flora ==
The sanctuary supports tropical and subtropical broadleaf forests. Dominant trees include sal (Shorea robusta), khair (Acacia catechu), tun (Toona ciliata), and chir pine (Pinus roxburghii). Flowering and fruit-bearing trees enhance habitat quality for wildlife.

A 2024 survey identified 108 forage plant species used by local communities grazing livestock within the sanctuary. Notable high-use taxa include Bauhinia variegata, Grewia optiva, Cassia fistula and Trifolium repens, reflecting integration of traditional forage knowledge into local pastoral practices.

== Fauna ==
The Sanctuary hosts leopards (Panthera pardus), barking deer (Muntiacus muntjak), sambar (Rusa unicolor), wild boar (Sus scrofa), Indian porcupine (Hystrix indica), and Himalayan black bear (Ursus thibetanus), among others.

As a designated Important Bird Area (IBA), Naina Devi supports over 200 bird species including the Indian paradise flycatcher, kalij pheasant, Himalayan bulbul, grey-headed canary flycatcher, and oriental turtle dove.

== Conservation ==
The 2019 Wildlife Institute of India study raised concerns over unregulated tourism, habitat fragmentation, and firewood dependence, recommending controlled access, habitat demarcation, community eco-development initiatives, and integration of traditional grazing knowledge into management plans. Additionally, the 2024 forage documentation highlights the value of local forage species in sustaining livestock while maintaining ecosystem balance.

== Tourism ==
Accessible via Swarghat–Bhakra road from Bilaspur (≈30 km), the sanctuary is best visited from October to May. Visitor entry is overseen by the Himachal Forest Department.
