= Ghumarwin =

- Town
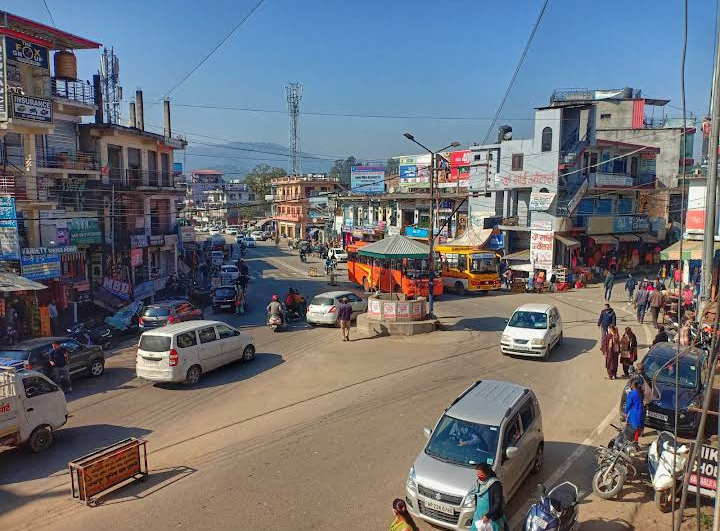
- View of Ghumarwin main road intersection

- Location in Himachal Pradesh, India Ghumarwin (India)
- Coordinates: 31.4358402°N 76.7118645°E
- Country: India
- State: Himachal Pradesh
- District: Bilaspur
- Established: 1970
- Founder: Government of Himachal Pradesh

Government
  - Type: Unicameral
  - Body: Municipal Council

Area
  - Total: 12 km^{2} (4.6 sq mi)
- Elevation: 700 m (2,300 ft)

Population (2011)
  - Total: 7,899
  - Density: 660/km^{2} (1,700/sq mi)

Languages
  - Official: Hindi
  - Regional: Bilaspuri
- Time zone: UTC+5:30 (IST)
- PIN: 174021
- Vehicle registration: HP-23

Ghumarwin is a town and a municipal council, near the town of Bilaspur in Bilaspur district in the North Indian State of Himachal Pradesh and is the second largest town of the entire district. The town is an anchor point for commuters between Bilaspur and Hamirpur and other parts of the state. Situated primarily between the hills of Lower Central Himalayas, Ghumarwin is situated at an average elevation of 700 metres or about 2300 ft. above sea level. It is one of the biggest commercial centres of Bilaspur district and one can find all kinds of shops, stores, services etc. here.

A major cultural and educational hub of Bilaspur, it's an emerging city located on a rivulet Seer Khud's bank in a valley which diverts towards Bilaspur city. The town celebrates a four-day fair at the dawn of summer in first week of April. The town is also a tehsil and home to expanding entrepreneurship along with the tehsildar office and court. Spread in all four directions, the town is growing National Highway 103 passes through Ghumarwin, State Highway 19 terminates, connecting it with Northern rural regions of the district.

Situated on Shimla-Kangra Road formerly NH 88 (Now NH 103) it is well connected to rest of neighbouring states. HRTC, CTU, Haryana Roadways, and Punjab Roadways buses and taxis operate to nearly all possible routes on each sides. Ghumarwin is situated at a distance of 105 km from the state capital Shimla, 22 km from Bilaspur, the district headquarter of Bilaspur. HRTC Volvo (HIMSUTA) and ordinary buses also operates to New Delhi from here from February 2019.

Despite lying in the lower Himalayan region, a suburb of Ghumarwin, Nihari experienced snowfall after 4 decades. In coming future is going to be connected by four lane in all directions. Ghumarwin is also connected to Kuthera 12 km away which is another fast developing sub center.

SR. NO.	CITY/TOWN	DISTANCE
1.	Hamirpur	41 km
2.	Una	97 km
3.	Bilaspur	17 km
4.	Swarghat	59 km
5.	Kiratpur	80 km
6.	Nalagarh	89 km
7.	Shimla	104 km
8.	Baddi	104 km
9.	Mandi	72 km
10.	Kullu	139 km
11.	Solan	120 km
12.	Dharamshala	130 km
13.	Chandigarh	121 km
14.	Panchkula	139 km
15.	Delhi	400 km

== Demographics ==
As of 2011 India census, Ghumarwin had a population of 7900. Rural population comprises 102000 people. Males constitute 53% of the population and females 47%. Ghumarwin has an average literacy rate of 80%, higher than the national average of 74%: male literacy is 80%, and female literacy is 76%. In Ghumarwin, 10% of the population is under 6 years.

== Medical Facilities ==
Ghumarwin is one of the chief centers for good quality medical care in the area and being surrounded by rural population it becomes the main place for hospitals. The Civil Hospital of Ghumarwin provides all essential medical facilities along with multiple private hospitals, clinics and pharmaceutical shops. The AIIMS Bilaspur is 30 km away from Ghumarwin, as well as it is well connected to IGMC, Shimla and PGIMER, Chandigarh via National Highways.

== Connectivity ==
Ghumarwin is a central location and can be reached by car, bus from any direction. It is extremely well connected by state and public bus services to Chandigarh, Delhi, Ambala, Bilaspur, Shimla, Dharmashala, Mandi, Hamirpur, Una, Solan, Kiratpur, Ropar, Nalagarh, Baddi, Panchkula, Haridwar, Dehradun, Kala Amb and other important cities as well. It is centrally distanced to all the three airports in Bhuntar (128 km.), Gaggal (104 km.) and Shimla (105 km.) and will be only 60 km away from the upcoming International Airport at Mandi.

The nearest railway stations are located in Kiratpur and Una, which are both connected to other parts of the country. The upcoming Bhanupli–Leh line, an all weather rail link from Bhanupalli, Punjab to Leh, making it the highest railway line in the world, will be accessible from Ghumarwin, opening opportunities for the people of the area.

The Kiratpur-Manali highway is accessible only at 7 km away from Ghumarwin.

Taxi services are easily available to and from the town to all parts of the state and other states and major cities at very affordable rates.

== Notable people ==
- Jagat Prakash Nadda, National President of the Bharatiya Janta Party
- Bhandari Ram, Victoria Cross
- Sanjay Kumar, Param Vir Chakra awardee
- Rattan Chand, Senior Bureaucrat

== Educational institutions ==
- Govt. Sr. Sec. School, Talyana
- Jai Him Jyoti Sr. Sec. School, Talyana
- Matrix-Academy Ghumarwin
- Swami Vivekanand Government College: It offers UG and PG courses like BA/BSc/BCom and MA/MSc. .
- Government Senior Secondary School (Boys & Girls)
- Government Senior Secondary School (Girls)
- D.A.V. Public School
- Government Senior Secondary School (Boys & Girls) Bharari
- College of Education
- Him Sarvodya Senior Secondary School
- Vision Convent School
- S.V.M High School
- Om Shanti Public School
- Govt Senior Secondary School Dadhol
- Minerva Public Sr. Sec. School
- Adarsh High School Ghumarwin
- Kendreya Vidyalaya Ghumarwin
- Navalok Adarsh Vidyalaya Khansra(Mehrin Kathla)
- Shivalik Publik School Marhana.Tel Ghumarwin
- YEN Law college (under construction camps site) Dakhiut Dangar Ghumarwin
- GSSS Panoh
- Thomson Public School Ghumarwin
- Holy Heart Public High School Ghumarwin
- Mind Roots Institute of Commerce and Training
