= Gambhari Devi =

Indian singer (1922–2013)

- Born: 1922
- Origin: Bilaspur, (A place which later on her name called Gambher pool) Himachal Pradesh, India
- Died: 8 January 2013 (aged 90–91)
- Occupations: Folk Musician, Folk Dancer and Folk Entertainer

Gambhari Devi (1922 – 8 January 2013) was a veteran Indian folk singer, folklorist and dancer from Bilaspur district, Himachal Pradesh, noted for her contribution to the folk culture of Himachal Pradesh.

She was awarded the Tagore Akademi Award (Tagore Akademi Puruskar) by the Sangeet Natak Akademi, the National Academy for Music, Dance and Drama in 2011, given to 100 artists from across India to mark the 150th birth anniversary of Rabindranath Tagore, for her contribution in the field of performing arts. In 2001 she received award from Himachal Academy of Arts. She died on 8 January 2013 at the age of 91.

== Life experiences ==
Gambhri Devi was born in Bandla village of Bilaspur district in Himachal Pradesh in 1922 in a Koli family. She started performing at the age of 8. She married at an early age like the other girls of the village which normally would have debarred her from singing and dancing. However, she persisted in folk performance despite the stigma attached to it.

== Her life ==
Such was her talent that society slowly forgot her social stigma and started inviting her to perform on various occasions. She eventually became so popular that no function could be complete without her performance. Such was her impact that she came to be seen as an idol of romance. People started gathering from far away places for her performances and the same locality considered marriage ceremonies unceremonious without her performance and attendance. She was considered a matinee idol of her time. She was accompanied by a drummer and a wrestler (Pistu urf Basanta Pehlwaan) who also become a legend along with Devi. This couple, never legally married, faced a great deal of hostility from conservative society. They could enjoy her performances but could not accept her liberal behaviour. Devi later sacrificed her love and on request of Devi herself, Basanta Pehlwaan later married another woman.

She continued performing till her later ages. She was not feeling well though and she discontinued performing because of her health issues in last few months of her life.

== Awards ==
- She received Tagore Akademi Award (Tagore Akademi Puruskar) by the Sangeet Natak Akademi in 2011.
- Achievement Award from HImachal Academy of Arts in 2001.
