= Bilaspur, Himachal Pradesh =

Bilaspur
- Town
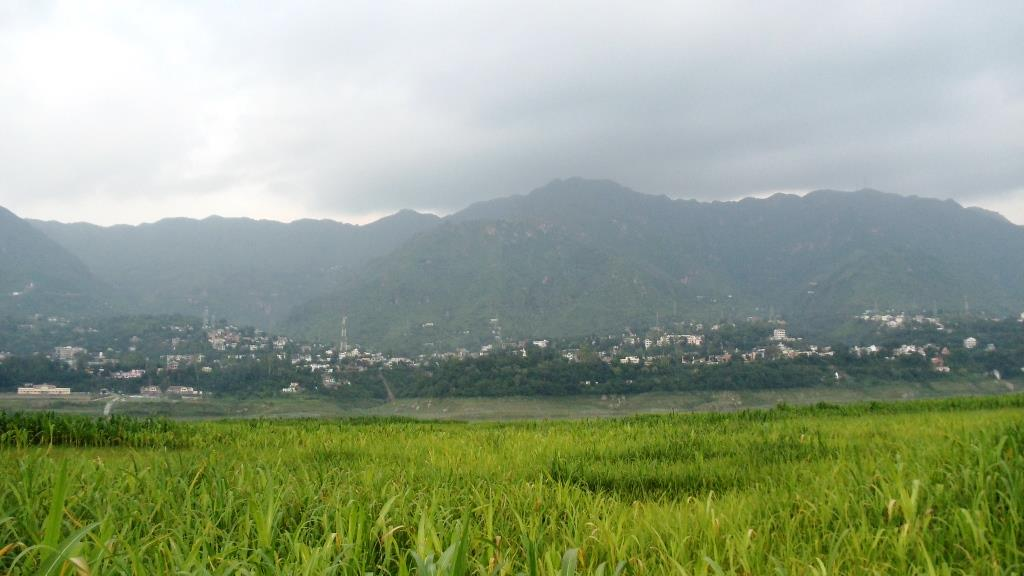
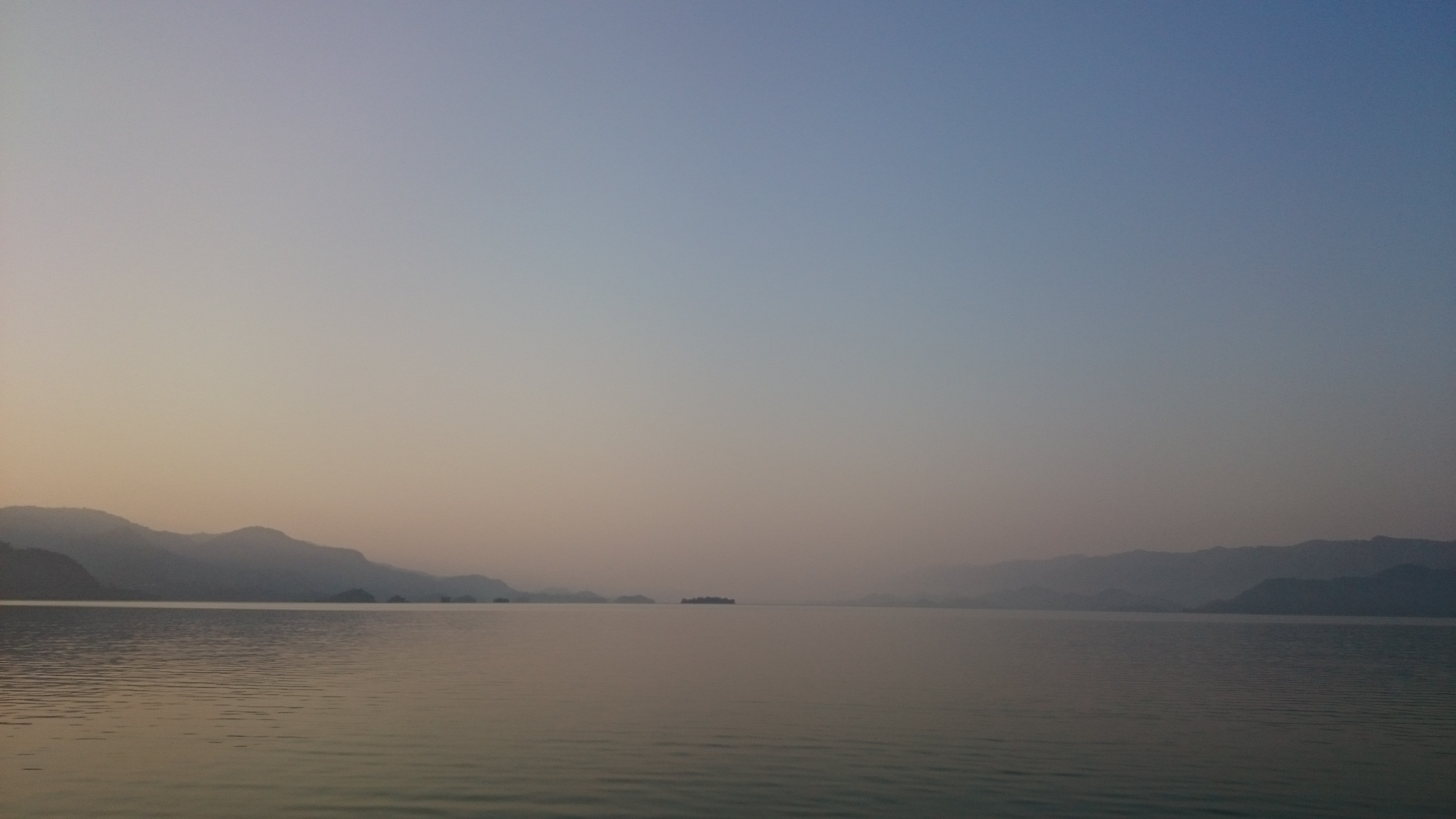
- From top to bottom: View of Bilaspur, View of Gobind Sagar lake

- Location in Himachal Pradesh, India Bilaspur (India)
- Coordinates: 31.33°N 76.75°E
- Country: India
- State: Himachal Pradesh
- District: Bilaspur
- Elevation: 673 m (2,208 ft)

Population (2011)
  - Total: 13,654
  - Rank: 13 in Himachal Pradesh
- Demonym(s): Bilaspuri, Himachali

Languages
  - Official: Hindi
  - Regional: Bilaspuri
- Time zone: UTC+5:30 (IST)
- PIN: 174001
- Telephone code: 01978
- Vehicle registration: HP-23, HP-24, HP-69, HP 89, HP-91
- Website: hpbilaspur.nic.in

Bilaspur is a town and a municipal council in Bilaspur district in the Indian state of Himachal Pradesh.

== History ==
Princely flag of Bilaspur

Bilaspur was the capital of a state of the same name founded in the 7th century, also known as Kahlur. The ruling dynasty were Chandel Rajputs, who claimed descent from the rulers of Chanderi in present-day Madhya Pradesh. The town of Bilaspur was founded in 1663. The state later became a princely state of British India, and was under the authority of the British province of Punjab.

On 13 May 1665, Guru Tegh Bahadur went to Bilaspur to attend the mourning and funeral ceremonies for Raja Dip Chand of Bilaspur. Rani Champa of Bilaspur made an offer to the Guru of a piece of land in her state, which the Guru accepted at the cost of 500 rupees. The land consisted of the villages of Lodipur, Mianpur, and Sahota. Guru Tegh Bahadur broke ground on a new settlement on 19 June 1665, which he named, Nanaki, after his mother.

In 1932, the state became part of the newly created Punjab States Agency, and in 1936 the Punjab Hill States Agency was separated from the Punjab States Agency. On 12 October 1948 the local ruler, Raja Sir Anand Chand, last ruler of Bilaspur [CHANDEL DYNASTY] acceded to the Government of India.

Bilaspur became a separate state of India under a chief commissioner, and on 1 July 1954, Bilaspur State was made a district of Himachal Pradesh state by an act of the Indian Parliament. When the Sutlej River was dammed to create the Govind Sagar, the historic town of Bilaspur was submerged, and a new town was built upslope of the old.

== Geography ==
Bilaspur is located at 31.33°N 76.75°E, with an average elevation of 673 m (2,208 ft). It is situated on the foot of the Bandla Hills, along the left bank of river Sutlej which forms picturesque landscape here owing to creation of Govind Sagar Dam on it. It is the first major town after entering Himachal Pradesh on the way to Manali.

== Climate ==
Bilaspur experiences warm summers and cool winters but is protected from the extremes temperature of the surrounding mountains by its situation in a valley. The monsoon, from July to September, is a period of high rainfall. From October to November, the lake is completely full. The highest temperature months are May and June when the temperature is typically around 37 °C (99 °F) and 38 °C (100 °F), sometimes exceeding 40 °C (104 °F).

Climate data for Bilaspur (1961–1990, rainfall 1951–2000)
Month	Jan	Feb	Mar	Apr	May	Jun	Jul	Aug	Sep	Oct	Nov	Dec	Year
Record high °C (°F)	26.5 (79.7)	30.7 (87.3)	35.0 (95.0)	40.7 (105.3)	45.5 (113.9)	44.2 (111.6)	42.1 (107.8)	37.5 (99.5)	36.5 (97.7)	39.6 (103.3)	34.8 (94.6)	27.4 (81.3)	45.5 (113.9)
Mean daily maximum °C (°F)	19.5 (67.1)	21.7 (71.1)	26.3 (79.3)	32.4 (90.3)	36.1 (97.0)	36.7 (98.1)	32.6 (90.7)	31.4 (88.5)	31.4 (88.5)	30.2 (86.4)	26.0 (78.8)	21.4 (70.5)	28.8 (83.8)
Mean daily minimum °C (°F)	4.9 (40.8)	6.7 (44.1)	10.3 (50.5)	15.7 (60.3)	19.5 (67.1)	23.1 (73.6)	22.4 (72.3)	22.3 (72.1)	20.1 (68.2)	14.6 (58.3)	9.6 (49.3)	5.9 (42.6)	14.6 (58.3)
Record low °C (°F)	−2.0 (28.4)	0.0 (32.0)	0.9 (33.6)	5.6 (42.1)	5.9 (42.6)	10.9 (51.6)	10.5 (50.9)	13.9 (57.0)	7.6 (45.7)	4.5 (40.1)	2.3 (36.1)	0.0 (32.0)	−2.0 (28.4)
Average rainfall mm (inches)	69.0 (2.72)	62.9 (2.48)	71.4 (2.81)	30.9 (1.22)	54.7 (2.15)	119.5 (4.70)	377.0 (14.84)	315.6 (12.43)	162.2 (6.39)	34.2 (1.35)	17.6 (0.69)	41.6 (1.64)	1,356.6 (53.41)
Average rainy days (≥ 2.5 mm)	4.0	4.0	4.3	2.2	3.2	5.8	14.7	14.4	7.1	1.6	1.2	2.4	64.9
Average relative humidity (%) (at 17:30 IST)	60	53	48	38	35	47	69	75	66	51	53	58	54
Source: India Meteorological Department

== Demographics ==
As of the 2001 Indian census, Bilaspur had a population of 13,058. Males constituted 56.25% of the population and females 43.75%. Bilaspur has an average literacy rate of 91%, which is higher than the national average of 74%. 10% of the population is under 6 years of age. Most people here live in the town or commute from nearby suburbs and rural areas for work. Most people work in services sector here.

== Transportation ==
Buses and taxis are the mode of public transport to the district and run from all major towns within the state as well as from those outside it. Bilaspur lies on the Chandigarh-Manali NH-205 highway. It is 86 km (53 mi) away from Shimla, the state capital, and 405 km (252 mi) from Delhi. The nearest major airport with daily scheduled flights from major cities is in Chandigarh, which is 141 km (88 mi). Manali, a major tourist attraction in Himachal Pradesh, is located 195 km (121 mi) from Bilaspur. Mandi, 70 km (43 mi) away, contains the Zonal headquarters of the district. Most of the long route buses that service Bilaspur are run by the state owned HRTC; local routes are operated by private bus operators.

== Landmarks ==
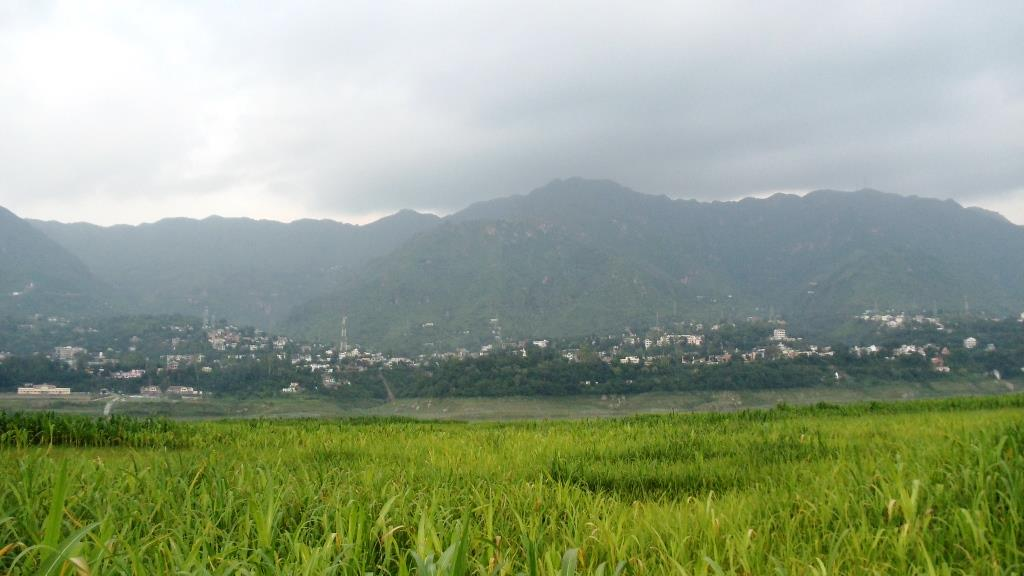
Panoramic view of Bilaspur.

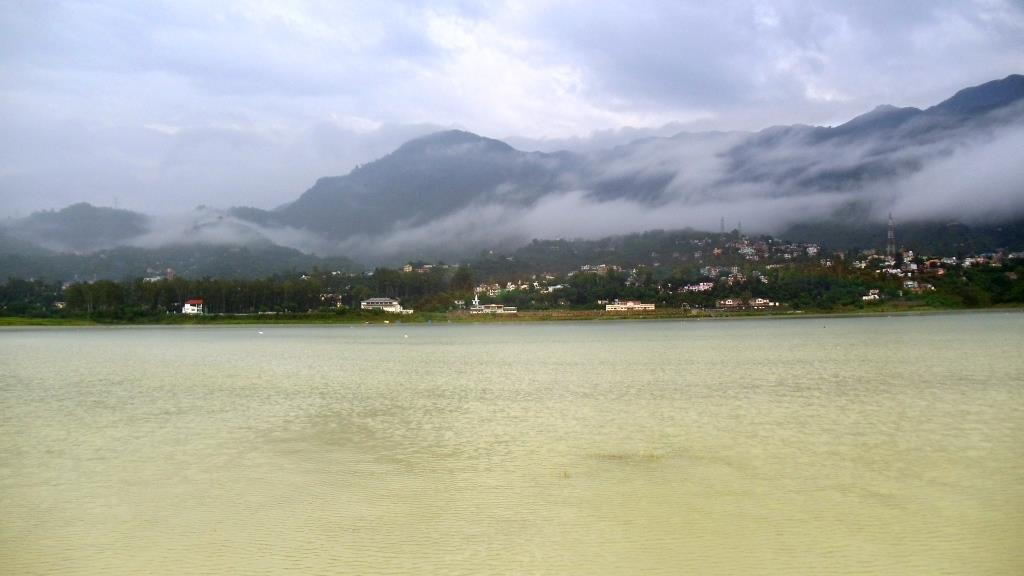
View of Bilaspur with Govind Sagar Lake completely full.

- Naina Devi Temple: The Temple of Shri Naina Devi Ji is situated on a hilltop in Bilaspur. The temple is connected with National Highway No. 21. The temple at the top of the hill can be reached via road (that curves around the hill up to a certain point) and then by concrete steps (that finally reach the top). There is also a cable car facility that moves pilgrims from the base of the hill all the way to the top. The hills of Naina Devi overlook the Gobind Sagar lake, which was created by the Bhakra-Nangal Dam. Several religious stories are associated with the establishment of the temple.
- Bhakra Dam: Bhakra Dam is a concrete gravity dam across the Satluj River in Bilaspur, Himachal Pradesh in northern India. The dam, located at a gorge near the (now submerged) upstream Bhakra village in Bilaspur district of Himachal Pradesh of 226 m. India's tallest dam is "Tehri dam "of 265 m. The length of the dam (measured from the road above it) is 518.25 m and the width is 9.1 m. Its reservoir known as "Gobind Sagar" stores up to 9.34 billion cubic metres of water. The 90 km long reservoir created by the Bhakra Dam is spread over an area of 168.35 km2. In terms of quantity of water, it is the third largest reservoir in India, the first being Indira Sagar Dam in Madhya Pradesh with capacity of 12.22 billion cu m and second Nagarjunasagar Dam. Described as "New Temple of Resurgent India" by Jawaharlal Nehru, the first prime minister of India, the dam attracts tourists from all over India. Bhakra dam is 15 km from Nangal city and 20 km from Naina Devi town.
- Gobind Sagar: A reservoir that was formed by the Bhakra Dam.
- Baba Nahar Singh Temple Dholra : The temple of Baba Nahar Singh exists at Dholra in the Bilaspur Town. The people all over Bilaspur worship Baba Nahar Singh. Baba is also known as ‘Bajia’, ‘Peepal Wala’, ‘Dalian Wala’. Baba Ji is known as apparent (Prtyaksh) god. Baba Nahar Singh was the god of Naggar the capital of Kullu Riyasat. Legend is that Raja Deep Chand (1650-1665) of Bilaspur married princess of Kullu Lai Dei (she is now known as Naggar Dei also). When the princess now known as Rani of Bilaspur reached Bilaspur she had frequent attacks of unconsciousness. The devoted persons of Bilaspur tried to find out the reason for this. They all came to the conclusion that Baba Nahar Singh has accompanied Rani and the God needs to be established with all religious rituals. Raja Deep Chand did the same and established the god in Dholra. ‘Kharaun’ (the wooden slippers) of Baba Nahar Singh symbolises him and are placed in the temple. In the month of ‘Jeth’ (mid May to mid June) on every Tuesday fairs are organised in the temple.
- Vyaas Gufa: The oldest and the most famous religious place which lies on the left bank of river Satluj. It is about 610 m above sea level. It is situated between the old and new Bilaspur Township. There is a common belief that Vyas Rishi of Mahabharata fame lived in this Gufa in penance. The name of the present Bilaspur town traces its origin to Rishi Vyas which was originally known as Vyaspur. It is a place of pilgrimage. It is about 0.5 km from district headquarters.
- Laxmi Narayan Temple: A temple where Laxmi Narayan is worshiped.
- Sidh Baba Balak Nath Cave Temple, Deotsidh: Baba Balak Nath is a Hindu deity worshiped in the northern Indian states of Punjab and Himachal Pradesh. His main temple is in Hamirpur, Himachal Pradesh. The base city is known as Shahtalai. Women are not allowed to enter the main garbagriha because Baba was a Brahmachari and could not have any females near him.
- Markandeya: Temple: Located on Ghagus-Brahmpukhar road. It is named after Rishi Markandeya. As per the history, Rishi Markandeya had no children and thus, he worshiped in this temple to have a child. As a result, Lord Shiva blessed him with one son but warned that the boy will live up to the age of 12 years only. So Rishi named his son as Markandeya. Later on, the child Markandeya worshiped Lord Shiva at this place and lastly when his claimed age was about to approach, he received the blessings from Lord Shiva in the form of a grant of his wishes.
- Hadimba Devi Temple: Hadimba Devi Temple is located atop a hill in Chalehli Village in Bilaspur district, Himachal Pradesh, at a distance of 5 km from Harlog on the Harlog-Hawaan Road. The shrine is dedicated to Goddess Durga, extensively known as Hadimba Devi, the symbol of Shakti.
- Badol Devi Temple: Badol Devi Temple is located atop a hill in Badol Village in Bilaspur district, Himachal Pradesh, at a distance of 3 km from Gehrwin on the Gehrwin-Dhanathar Road. The shrine is dedicated to Goddess Durga, extensively known as Badol Devi, the symbol of Shakti.
- Kandrour Bridge: A bridge located 8 kilometres from Bilaspur on National Highway No-154, across the river Satluj. Its construction was started in April 1959 and was completed in 1965. The total cost of construction came to Rs. 28,12,998. The span of the bridge is about 280 meters with a breadth of about seven meters and the height above the lowest river bed below is about 80 meters.The pillars supporting the bridge are hollowed. The bridge was opened by Shri Raj Bahadur, Minister of Transport in 1965.
- Rukmani Kund: A rock water body, It can be accessed by taking Bhager-Gehrwin route via Hirapur.
- Gugga Gehrwin Temple: A temple dedicated to Gugga situated on the cliff near Gehrwin which is about 36 km ahead of Bilaspur.
- Purnam Mall: Completed in 2017, this complex consists of a cineplex, multiple brand stores, restaurants and bar, shopping complexes like Vishal mega mart. Reliance digital, cleverly crafted ornaments and designs on walls and infrastructure to look at for tourists because of its location by National Highways.

== Notable people from Bilaspur ==
- Bhandari Ram, Victoria Cross recipient
- Sanjay Kumar, Param Veer Chakra recipient
- Suresh Chandel Indian politician
- Jagat Prakash Nadda, President of the Bharatiya Janta Party and Former Union Minister of Health and Family Welfare. His residence is located in Vijaypur.
- Rattan Chand, senior bureaucrat, Government of India; advisor, World Bank
- Yami Gautam, Bollywood/television actress
- Zorawar Singh Kahluria, Army General

== See also ==
- Bhanupli–Leh line
- Naina Devi Wildlife Sanctuary
