= Temples of modern India =

Political phrase

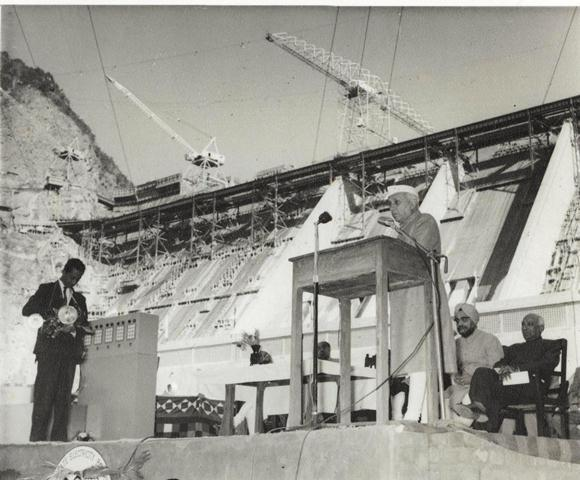
Jawaharlal Nehru at Bhakra in 1953

Temples of modern India was a term coined by India's first Prime Minister Jawaharlal Nehru while starting the construction of the Bhakra Nangal Dam to describe scientific research institutes, steel plants, power plants, dams being launched in India after independence to jumpstart scientific and industrial progress.

These projects were part of his vision of development of modern India with a mix of heavy industries and scientific research institutes.

Most of the PSUs and scientific institutions such as the IITs were created by him as part of his vision of modern India.
