= Harvey Slocum =

Harvey Slocum (October 23, 1887 – November 11, 1961) was an American heavy construction superintendent and dam-building expert, known primarily for his part in the construction of Grand Coulee Dam in the United States and the Bhakra Dam in India. Manly Harvey Slocum was born in National City, San Diego County, California. His father was a construction foreman for John D. Spreckels, and his mother was a schoolteacher and principal. Slocum ended his schooling after the 8th grade and spent the next two years as a messenger boy and hustler in the redlight districts of San Diego and San Francisco.

Upon his return to San Diego in 1904, Slocum worked as a cabinet maker and then as an ironworker erecting the steel infrastructure for several buildings in downtown San Diego. By 1915, Slocum went from laborer to construction foreman and then superintendent. He told Booten Herndon, a writer for Colliers Magazine, "Hell, it's easy. You just do twice as much work as anybody else, and the boss makes you foreman. Then you do three times as much work, and the next thing you know you're doing his job."

Slocum joined the San Diego Rowing Club in 1905 and became one its top rowers winning championships in single and double sculls in California and Washington. In 1916, Slocum barely survived the explosion of a gas stove in a construction tent in San Diego. He suffered severe burns over much of his face and body. In 1917, Slocum was hired by Bent Brothers Construction based in Los Angeles to take over supervision of construction of Lake Hodges Dam near Escondido, California. After completing the dam, Harvey married his long-term girlfriend, Helen Ensminger. Slocum continued to oversee construction of several more dams in California for Bent Brothers including Gibraltar Dam (Santa Barbara), Henshaw Dam (San Diego), Bullard's Bar Dam (Yuba County), and Exchequer Dam (Merced). Slocum taught himself how to estimate the cost to construct these mammoth projects and Exchequer, at the time the largest concrete dam in the world, was the first job Slocum bid on his own.

Eventually, Slocum rose to the position of construction superintendent on the Grand Coulee Dam. Slocum prepared the winning bid made by the construction venture, MWAK, for this Bureau of Reclamation project during the Great Depression of the United States. Between 1934 and 1937, Slocum oversaw the construction of that portion of Grand Coulee known as the low dam. He was fired by MWAK because of his alcoholism.

Over the next 18 months, Slocum was in and out of hospitals in Los Angeles trying to stop drinking. From his hospital bed in 1938, Slocum prepared for Pacific Constructors the winning bid for the construction of the Shasta Dam across the Sacramento River in Northern California. But he wasn't well enough to oversee the construction. Slocum quit drinking for good the following year at the age of 51 and was hired by Bent Brothers to prepare the bid for construction of Friant Dam in Central California. Bent Bros was awarded the contract and Slocum oversaw construction of, at the time, the fourth largest concrete dam in the world.

During World War II, Slocum worked for the U.S. Navy as an unpaid civilian construction consultant on several projects including the Alaska Highway and a breakwater in Guam. While in Guam, Slocum prepared the successful bid by Ozark Dam Constructors for the Bull Shoals Dam in Mountain Home, Arkansas.

Harvey Slocum was then hired as Construction Superintendent of the Bull Shoals Dam built between 1947 and 1951.

Slocum joined the Bhakra Dam construction project as head supervising engineer of construction in 1952 and imprinted on it his own distinctive style of working. He was a flamboyant personality who drove a current model powder blue Cadillac convertible; not expected of an engineer in those times in India. He was also known as a stern disciplinarian. All officers and workers on the dorm were mandated to dress uniformly and historian Ramachandra Guha writes that Slocum "could not abide the sloth and inefficiency that was rampant around him". Many workers from the United States Bull Shoals Dam project joined Slocum on the construction of the Bhakra Dam. A small city was constructed to house the U.S. workers. Slocum died in New Delhi at age 74.
