= Chandelier (disambiguation) =

A chandelier is a decorative ceiling-mounted light fixture.

Chandelier may also refer to:

- "Chandelier" (song), a 2014 song by Sia
- Chandelier (Plastic Tree album), 2006
- Chandelier (Rachael Sage album), 2008
- "Chandelier", a song by Idlewild from their 2009 album Post Electric Blues
- "Chandelier", a song by Stan Walker from his 2010 album From the Inside Out
- "Chandelier", a song by Architects from their 2025 album The Sky, the Earth & All Between
- Chandelier, 2008 album by Factor Chandelier
- Chandeliers (band), an electronic ensemble from Chicago

== See also ==
- Le Chandelier, an 1835 play
- Chandelier Tree, a redwood tree in Leggett, California
- Chandelier bidding, a bidding strategy in auctions
- Chandeleur (disambiguation)
