= Bilaspur district, Himachal Pradesh =

District of Himachal Pradesh in India

Coordinates: 31.33°N 76.75°E

Bilaspur district
- District of Himachal Pradesh
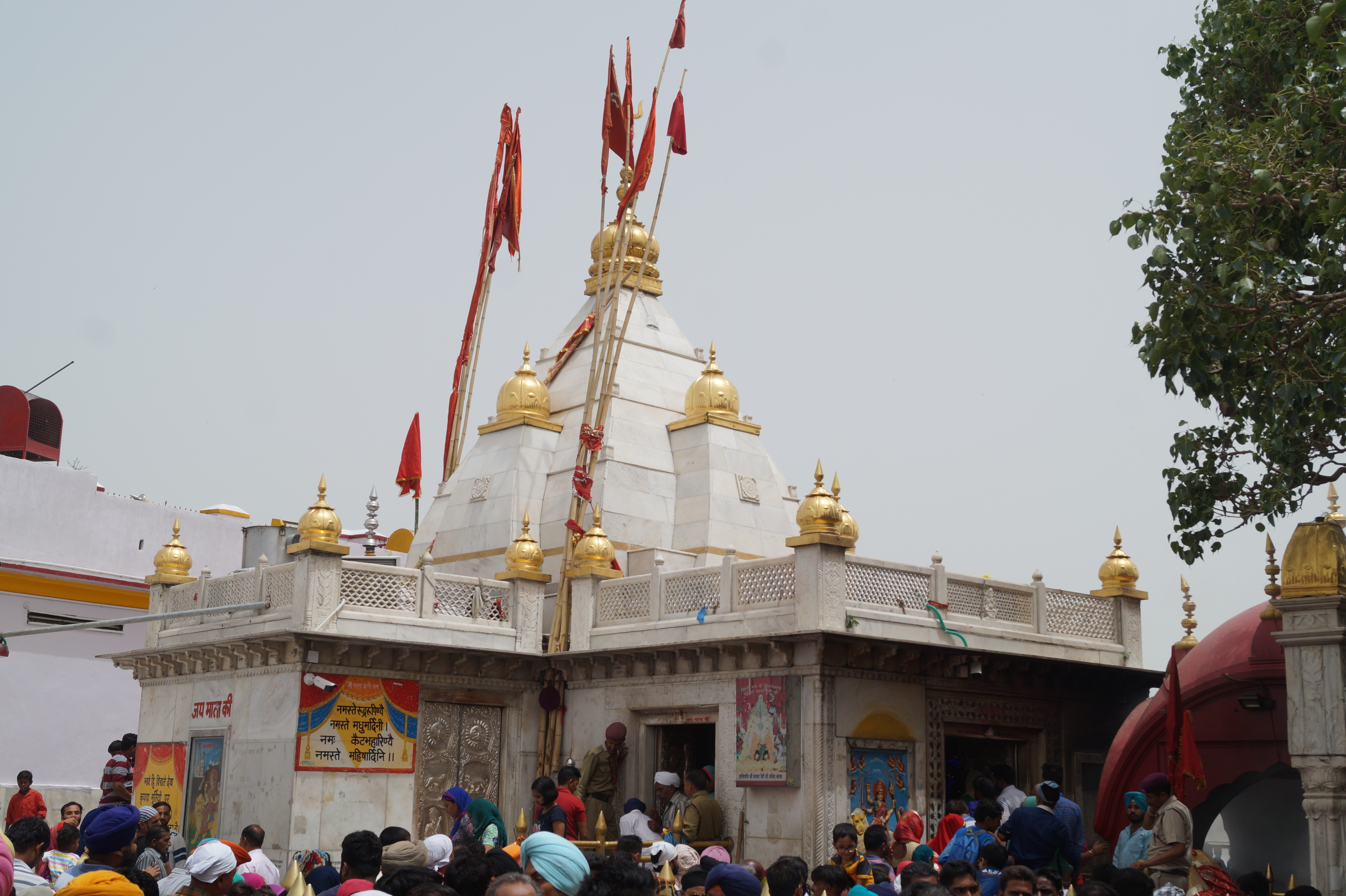
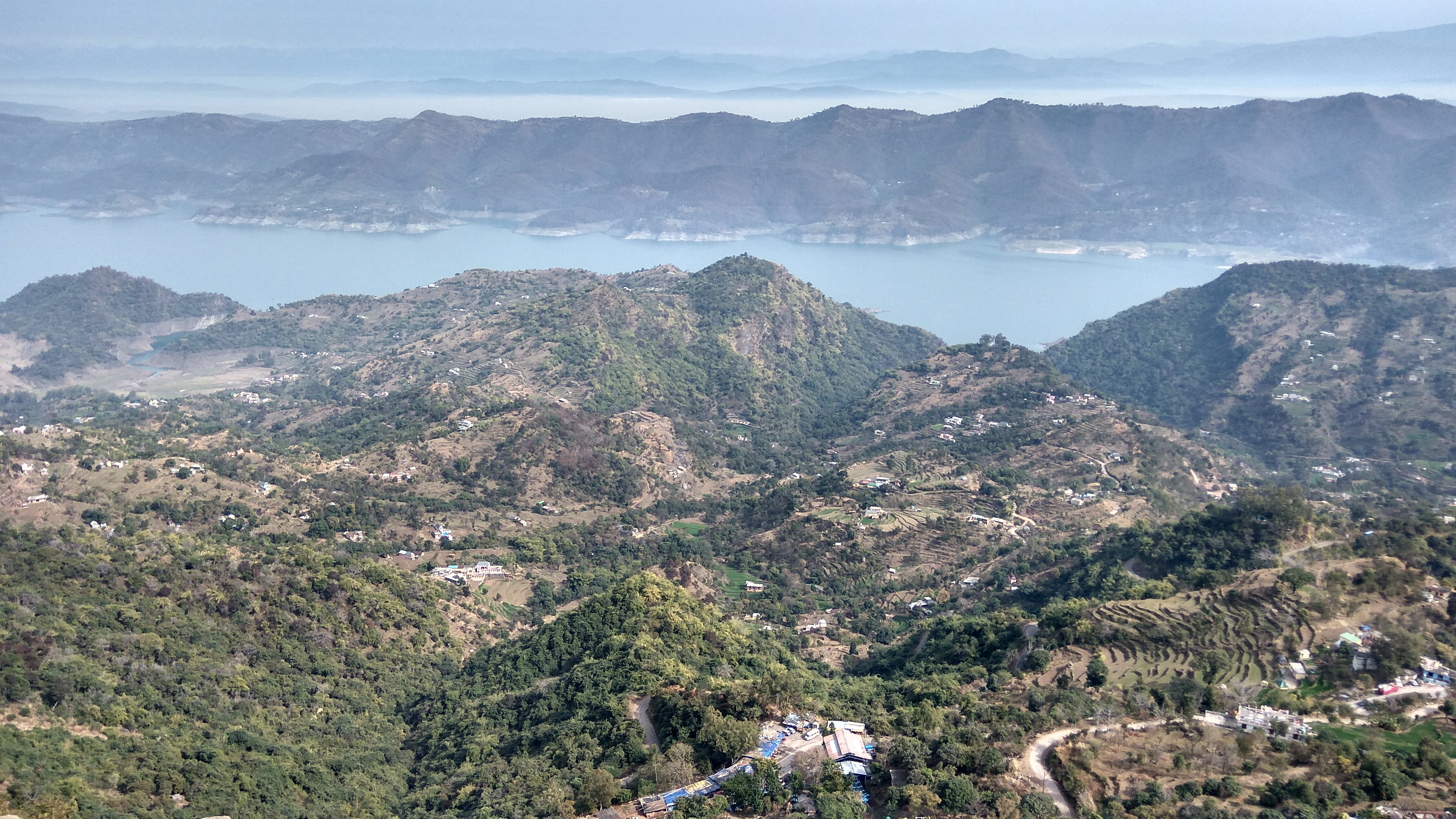
- Top: Naina Deviji Temple; Bottom: Gobind Sagar, formed by the damming of the Sutlej
- Interactive map of Bilaspur district
- Country: India
- State: Himachal Pradesh
- Headquarters: Bilaspur
- Tehsils: Ghumarwin, Naina devi, Jhandutta,

Area
  - Total: 1,167 km^{2} (451 sq mi)

Population (2011)
  - Total: 381,956
  - Density: 327.3/km^{2} (847.7/sq mi)

Languages
  - Official: Hindi
  - Regional: Bilaspuri
- Time zone: UTC+05:30 (IST)
- Vehicle registration: HP-23, HP-24, HP-69, HP-89, HP-91
- Website: hpbilaspur.nic.in

Bilaspur district is a district of Himachal Pradesh, India. Its capital is in the town of Bilaspur. The district has an area of 1,167 km^{2}, and a population of 381,956. As of 2011 it is the third least populous district of Himachal Pradesh (out of 12), after Lahul and Spiti and Kinnaur.

The district has the famous Govind Sagar Lake on the Sutlej River which acts as the reservoir for the Bhakra and Nangal Dam project.

== History ==
Princely flag of Bilaspur

The area that is now Bilaspur District was formerly known as Kahlur, a princely state of British India. The ruler acceded to the Government of India on 12 October 1948, and Bilaspur was made an Indian state under a chief commissioner. The state of Bilaspur was merged with Himachal Pradesh on 1 July 1954 and became Bilaspur District.

Bilaspur was the capital of a state founded in the 7th century, and known as Kahlur after its earlier capital, or as Bilaspur after its later capital. The ruling dynasty was Chandela Rajputs, who claimed descent from the rulers of Chanderi in present-day Madhya Pradesh. The town of Bilaspur was founded in 1663. The state later became a princely state of British India, and was under the authority of the British province of Punjab.

On 13 May 1665, Guru Tegh Bahadur went to Bilaspur to attend the mourning for Rajput Chandel King Raja Dip Chand of Bilaspur. There Rani Champa of Bilaspur gave the Guru a piece of land in her state. The land consisted of the villages of Lodhipur, Mianpur and Sahota. Here on the mound of Makhowal, Guru Tegh Bahadur raised a new habitation. The ground was broken on 19 June 1665, by Baba Gurditta Randhawa. The new village was named after the Guru's mother, Nanaki. Chakk Nanaki later became famous as Anandpur Sahib.

In 1932 state was made part of the newly created Punjab States Agency, and in 1936 the Punjab Hill States Agency was separated from the Punjab States Agency. India became independent in 1947, and on 12 October 1948 the ruler, HH Raja Sir Anand Chandel, the last ruler of the princely estate of Bilaspur acceded to the Government of India. Bilaspur became a separate state of India under a chief commissioner, and on 1 July 1954 Bilaspur state was made a district of Himachal Pradesh state by an act of the Indian Parliament. The historic town was submerged in 1954 when the Sutlej River was dammed to create the Govind Sagar, and a new town was built upslope of the old.

Most of the Rajputs in Bilaspur are Chandels, that is they belong to different branches of the ruling family. These families are numerous, and all enjoyed jagir pensions from state amounting in aggregate to Rs. 40,000 a year in 1933. They are called 'the Mian families', and the chief names are: Ajmerchandia, Kaliyanchandia, Tarahandia and Sultanchandia.

== Geography ==
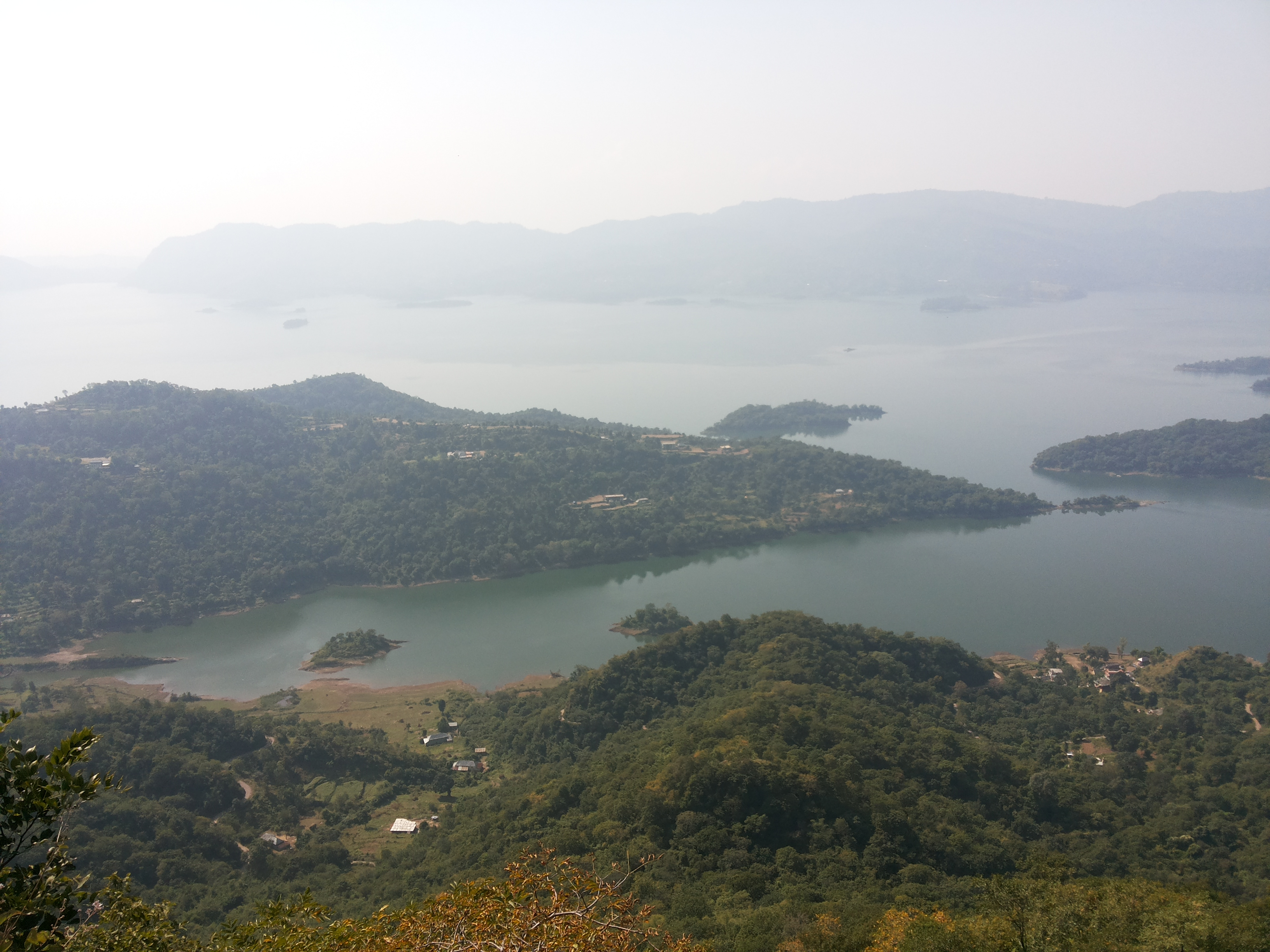
The artificial Gobind Sagar lake, formed by the construction of the Bhakra Dam, is now one of the district's more prominent landforms.

Bilaspur district has a total area of 1,161 square kilometers, making it the smallest district in Himachal Pradesh. It covers the same territory as the princely state did in 1947, and there have been no changes in its boundaries since then.

The district lies in the outer foothills of the Himalayas, at the point where they meet the Punjab plains. There are no major mountains in the district, and the overall elevation isn't especially high, but the terrain is very hilly. Flat land is restricted to narrow areas along rivers and streams. The main river in Bilaspur district is the Satluj, which flows through the middle of the district for about 90 km and divides it into two approximately equal parts. All the other streams in the district eventually flow to the Satluj.

Since the construction of the Bhakra Dam, another major feature of the district is the Gobind Sagar lake. Its formation submerged about 30,000 acres of land belonging to 256 villages. 14 villages were completely submerged.

=== Topography ===
The district's terrain is essentially a series of hills and valleys. There are no large plains, and flat land is mostly restricted to areas along streams. Elevation varies from 290 m above sea level at the lowest point to about 1,980 m at the highest point. In general, the lower areas are in the west, near the border with Punjab's Hoshiarpur district; while the higher areas are in the east, towards the border with Solan district.

==== Hills ====
Hills surround Bilaspur district on all sides and dominate the local landscape. Combined with the Satluj river, these hills historically formed strong natural defenses. Seven main ranges of hills (known as dhars) stand out in particular, hence the region's historical nickname Sat-dhar-Kahlur — "Kahlur of the seven hills".

==== Valleys ====
Valleys in the district are fairly small and mostly restricted to the immediate vicinity of streams. However, they are especially important from a human perspective because they have the best farmland, and they are by far more extensively cultivated and more densely populated than the hills themselves.

The Satluj valley has never been wide in this area, but patches of flat land exist all along its course through the district. The area downstream from Bilaspur used to have the most extensive of these, but since the construction of the Bhakra Dam much of the valley is underwater. The Chaunta valley, which is now submerged under Gobind Sagar, was an especially large section of the Satluj valley. Another important valley is the Danwin valley, which is between the Bandla and Bahadurpur hills and is about 10 km long and 5 km wide. This area is an important producer of various agricultural goods, particularly maize, rice, sugarcane, ginger, and wheat.

=== Hydrology ===
==== Rivers ====
Rivers supply about 40% of the irrigation used in the district; the other 60% comes from springs.

===== Satluj river =====
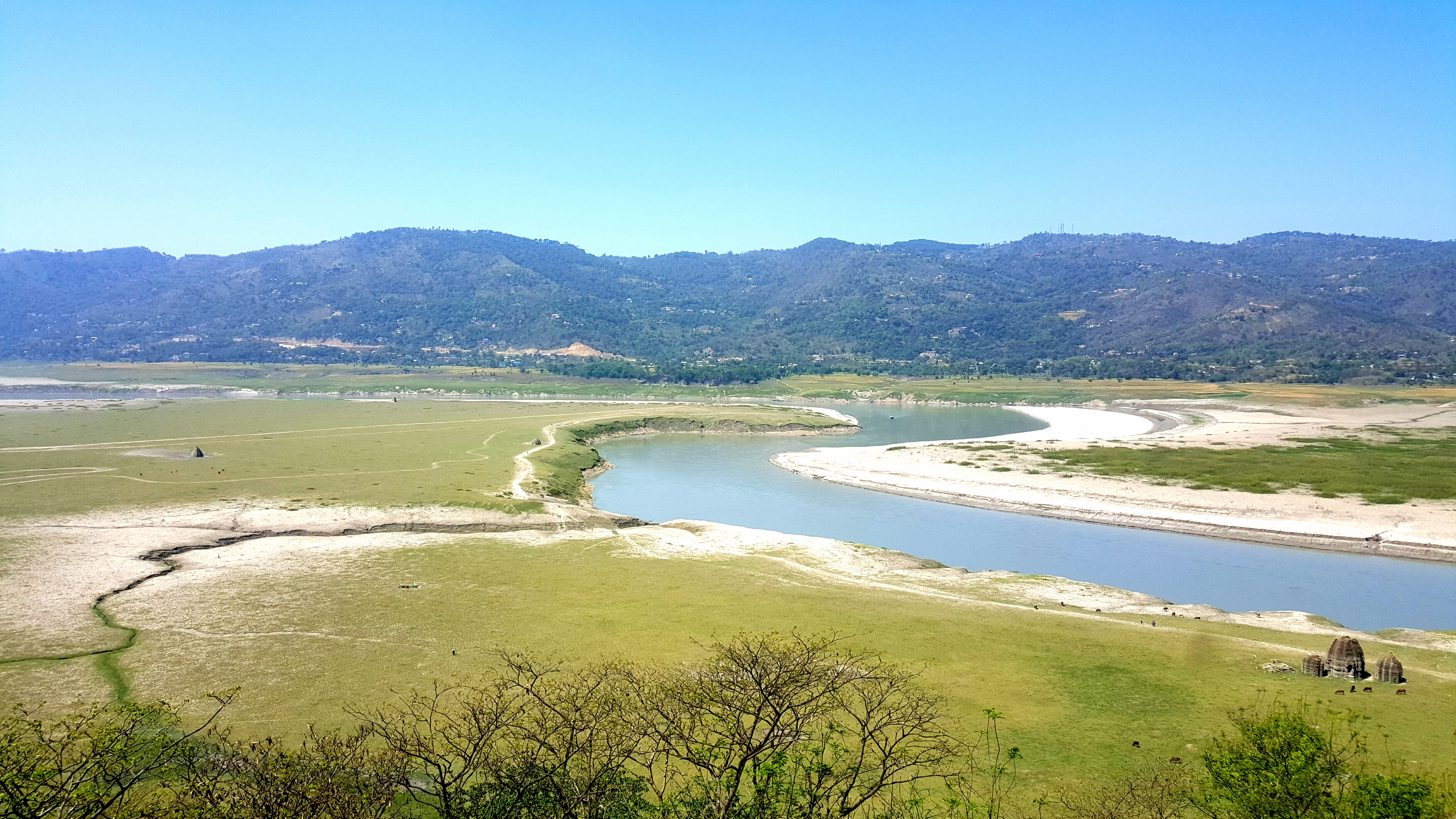
The Satluj is the most important river in Bilaspur district.

The Satluj is the main river in Bilaspur district. It enters the district at the village of Kasol in the northeast and flows for 90 km before exiting the district at the village of Neila in the southwest and continuing into Punjab. There are several bends in its course below Bilaspur. Its main left-bank tributaries (coming from the southeast) in the district are the Ali, Ghamrola, and Ghamber streams; its main right-bank tributaries (coming from the northwest) are the Moni and Ser.

The Satluj is a deep and fast-flowing river, typically flowing at a rate of about 8 km/h. Its water is cold, and it is home to many fish. Its average width in the district is about 45 m. During the winter, between October and March, the river's water level is lower. Beginning in April, it rises again as snowmelt in the mountains supplies it with more water. The water rises even more during the rainy season.

===== Ali stream =====
The Ali stream rises in neighboring Solan district and enters Bilaspur district near the villages of Kothi Harrar and Manothi. It traverses the district for 35 km before joining the Satluj at a point known as the Beri Ghat. This is about 3 km north of Bilaspur, between the villages of Kherian and Talwar. The Ali is a perennial stream, but since its headwaters generally don't receive snowfall, the stream's water level is usually low, especially in the summer. During the rainy season, though, it gets much larger so as to be impassable. In these conditions, people cross it by using inflated animal skins, as with the Satluj. There is also a bridge at Ghaghas, 14 km from Bilaspur.

===== Ghamber khad =====
After arising in the Shimla hills, the Ghamber passes through the Sabathu and Bhagal regions before entering Bilaspur district at the village of Neri. It then traverses the district for 13 km before joining the Satluj near the villages of Dagran and Nerli. The Ghamber has a deep bed and is only sparingly used for irrigation. The Bilaspur-Nalagarh road crosses this stream. During the rainy season, the stream floods and becomes unfordable and traffic must be halted for hours at a time. Various fish live in the Ghamber, and it is a popular site for sport fishing. In general, the fish tend to be small (less than 10 lbs) for most of its course, but much larger ones can be caught closer to the confluence with the Satluj. At this end, the Ghamber is not fordable in any weather.

===== Ser khad =====
Also known as the Sir or Seer khad, this stream is the largest right-bank tributary of the Satluj in the district. It originates in neighboring Mandi district and enters Bilaspur district at the village of Hatwar. Two other khads, the Sukar and Saryali, originate in Hamirpur district and drain part of western Bilaspur district before joining the Ser khad at Balghar. The Ser khad ultimately joins the Satluj between the villages of Seri and Matla, downstream from Bilaspur. It powers many water mills, but because of its deep bed it isn't useful for irrigation. In rainy weather, it runs so fast that it can't be forded.

==== Lakes and tanks ====
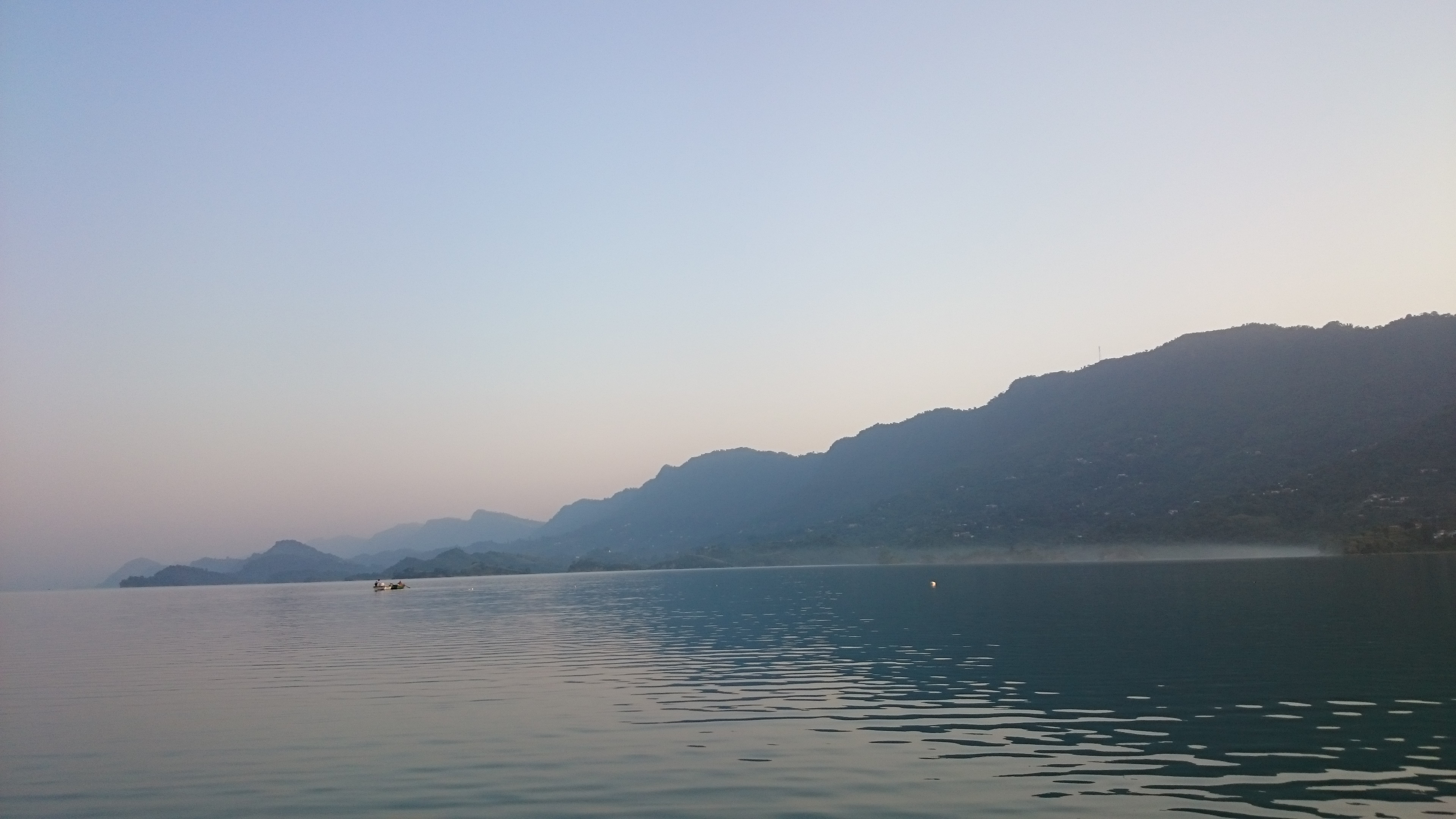
A view of Gobind Sagar in the late afternoon

There are no natural lakes in Bilaspur district, but the artificial Gobind Sagar is one of the largest lakes in India. It stores a huge volume of water, which is used for both irrigation and electricity generation. It is formed by the Bhakra Dam, which was completed in 1963. The lake is 90 km long and its total area is 168 km^{2}. About 90% of this area belongs to Bilaspur district; the remainder belongs to Una district. The lake's water level fluctuates. It is designated as a waterfowl refuge, and about 50 species of fish live in its waters. Gobind Sagar is a popular tourist destination, and it is also a site for various recreational activities like fishing, swimming, sailing, rowing, and water-skiing.

Many tanks also exist in the district. In the local language, a tank is called a toba. Some of the more prominent tanks in the district are Riwalsar, near the village of Panol; the Jagat Khana tank, built in 1874 and with a capacity of 9,000 cubic meters; the Swarghat tank, also built in 1874 (which was a time of famine); the tanks at Naina Devi, Jamthal, and Kasol; and Toba Sanghwana ("the lion tank"), also called Toba Kolanwala ("the lotus tank") and with a capacity of 53,000 cubic meters.

==== Springs ====
Various springs are scattered throughout the district. They provide an important source of water for drinking, irrigation, washing, and bathing. Some of them are considered sacred, or otherwise reputed to have medicinal properties. These include the Markand spring, near Bilaspur; the Luhnd spring, at the village of Dadrana near Swarghat; and the Bassi spring, at the village of Bassi. The Bassi spring, for example, draws pilgrims particularly during the summer and is the site of a fair.

=== Climate ===
The climate of Bilaspur district is generally somewhat milder than that of the Punjabi plains below. There are four seasons: summer, monsoon, post-monsoon, and winter. Summers are hot and last from March until the end of June. Temperatures rise throughout the summer and typically peak in June. The rainy season lasts from early July to mid-September. With the coming of the monsoon rains, daytime temperatures drop significantly, although nighttime temperatures stay about the same until mid-September when they drop too. About 70% of the rainfall comes during the monsoon season. The post-monsoon season is the months of October and November, and winter lasts from December to February. Cold waves happen throughout the winter, and December is the coldest month. Also during the winter, there is fog along banks of the Satluj.

=== Flora and fauna ===
==== Forests ====
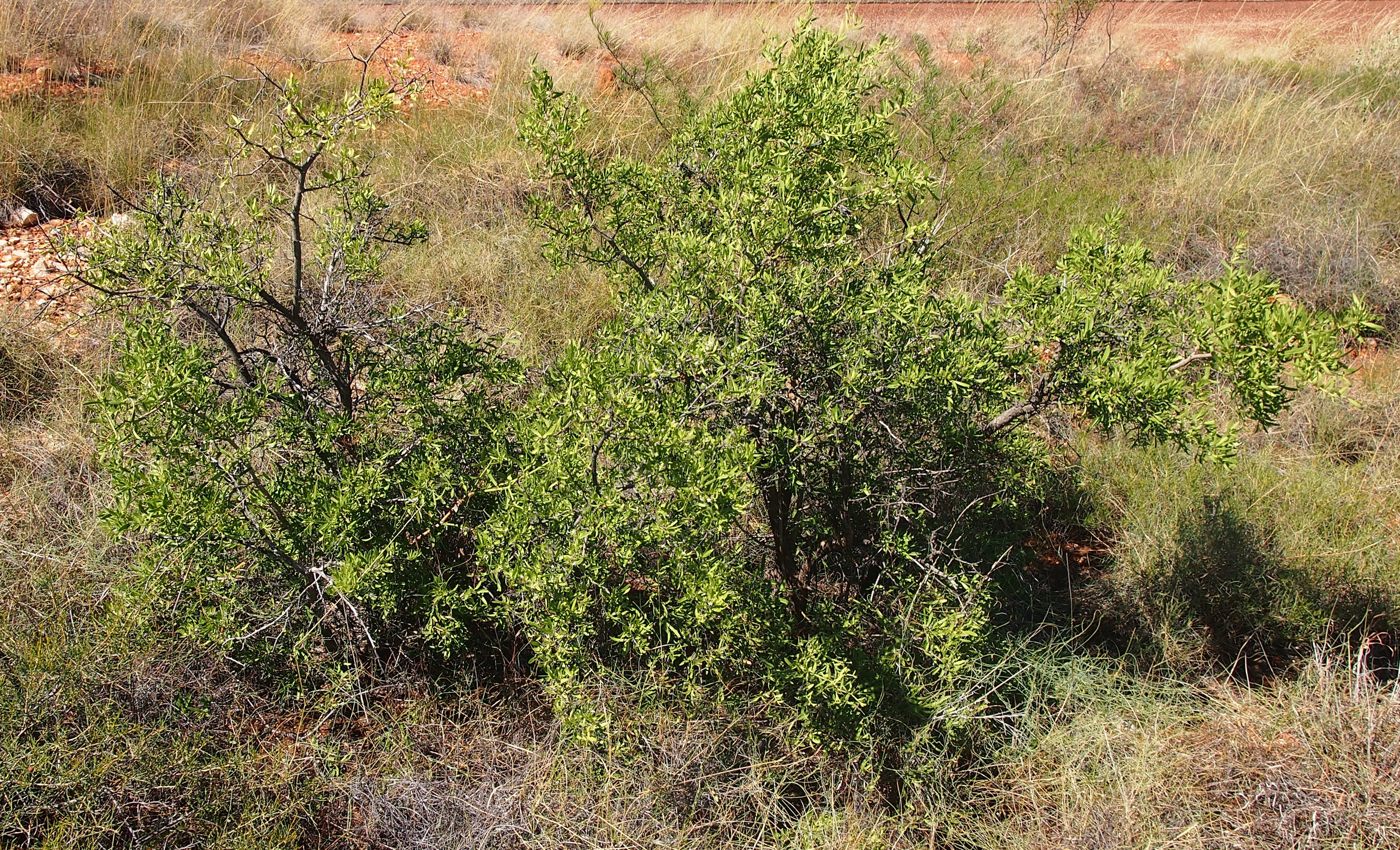
Carissa spinarum is one of the predominant brushy plants in the district's scrub forests.

As of 1975, various types of subtropical forest occupy about 500 square kilometers in Bilaspur district, or about 42% of its total area. They are neither particularly rich or very large, and are mostly found on the rocky upper parts of ridges. The main forest types are scrub forests, bamboo forests, chir pine forests, and oak forests. Chir forests are mainly found in the northern and eastern parts of the district, while the south and west is occupied by scrub forest.

More than two-thirds of the district's total forest cover consists of scrub forest. These are mainly found in the southern and western parts of the district, as well as some in the eastern parts; they are especially on the Naina Devi, Kot, Tiun, and Sariun hills. The scrub forests generally exist on relatively poor soil — the more fertile areas have been made into farmland. Extensive grazing and lopping cause damage to the forests, reducing cover of larger trees.

==== Fauna ====
Among the mammals found in Bilaspur district are leopards, wolves, wild pigs, hares, monkeys, ghurals, kakars (also called "barking deer"), sehars (porcupines), barasinghas, and chitals (aka the spotted deer). Tigers were once native to the area but now they are virtually extinct. The district's birds include black and grey partridges, the blue hill pigeon, the common peafowl, the chil pheasant, the koklas pheasant, the white-crested kalij, and the chukar partridge. In terms of fish, the mahsir (Barbus tor) is numerous, particularly in the Satluj and lower Ghamber. Other native fish species include the Indian trout (Barilius bura), the gunch (Bagarius yarrelli), the Himalayan barbel, and the gid (Labeo diplostomus). The mirror carp, an introduced species, is now found here as well. In terms of reptiles, cobras and other snakes are common, particularly in stream valleys.

=== Geology ===
Most of Bilaspur district's exposed terrain is relatively young on a geological time scale. Tertiary and Quaternary deposits predominate, and older layers are only exposed in the eastern part of the district. Tectonic uplift of the Himalayas has been accompanied by extensive folding, faulting, and thrusting that has disrupted the original order of various rock strata — in some places, older layers are next to or even on top of newer layers.

== Demographics ==
=== Population ===
Historical population
Year	Pop.	±% p.a.
1901	90,873	—
1911	93,107	+0.24%
1921	98,000	+0.51%
1931	100,994	+0.30%
1941	110,336	+0.89%
1951	126,099	+1.34%
1961	158,806	+2.33%
1971	194,786	+2.06%
1981	247,368	+2.42%
1991	295,387	+1.79%
2001	340,885	+1.44%
2011	381,956	+1.14%

According to the 2011 census Bilaspur district, Himachal Pradesh has a population of 381,956, roughly equal to the nation of Maldives. This gives it a ranking of 562 in India (out of a total of 640). The district has a population density of 327 inhabitants per square kilometre (850/sq mi). Its population growth rate over the decade 2001-2011 was 12.08%. Bilaspur has a sex ratio of 981 females for every 1000 males, and a literacy rate of 85.67%. 6.58% of the population lives in urban areas. Scheduled Castes and Scheduled Tribes make up 25.92% and 2.80% of the population respectively.

=== Religion ===
Religions in Bilaspur district (2011)
Religion	Percent
Hinduism	97.39%
Islam	1.83%
Sikhism	0.62%
Other or not stated	0.16%
Distribution of religions

Religious groups in Bilaspur State (British Punjab province era)
Religious group	1921		1931		1941	
Religious group	Pop.	%	Pop.	%	Pop.	%
Hinduism (Note: 1931-1941: Including Ad-Dharmis)	96,000	97.96%	99,023	98.05%	108,375	98.22%
Islam	1,559	1.59%	1,458	1.44%	1,498	1.36%
Sikhism	437	0.45%	507	0.5%	453	0.41%
Christianity	4	0%	6	0.01%	7	0.01%
Jainism	0	0%	0	0%	3	0%
Zoroastrianism	0	0%	0	0%	0	0%
Buddhism	0	0%	0	0%	0	0%
Judaism	0	0%	0	0%	0	0%
Others	0	0%	0	0%	0	0%
Total population	98,000	100%	100,994	100%	110,336	100%
Note: British Punjab province era district borders are not an exact match in the present-day due to various bifurcations to district borders — which since created new districts — throughout the historic Punjab Province region during the post-independence era that have taken into account population increases.

=== Language ===
Languages of Bilaspur district (2011)
1. Bilaspuri (76.4%)
2. Pahari (8.56%)
3. Hindi (5.80%)
4. Punjabi (4.00%)
5. 'Other' Hindi (1.58%)
6. Kangri (1.25%)
7. Mandeali (0.96%)
8. Others (1.48%)

At the 2011 Census, 76.37% of the population spoke Bilaspuri, 8.56% Pahari, 5.80% Hindi, 4.00% Punjabi, 1.25% Kangri and 0.96% Mandeali as their first language.

== Politics ==
No.	Constituency	Member	Party	Remarks	Reference
46	Jhanduta (SC)	Jeet Ram Katwal	Bharatiya Janata Party		
47	Ghumarwin	Rajinder Garg	Bhartiya Janata Party	Food, Civil Supplies and Consumer Affairs Minister	
48	Bilaspur	Subhash Thakur	Bharatiya Janata Party		
49	Sri Naina Deviji	Ram Lal Thakur	Indian National Congress		

== Populated places ==
=== Towns ===
==== Bilaspur ====
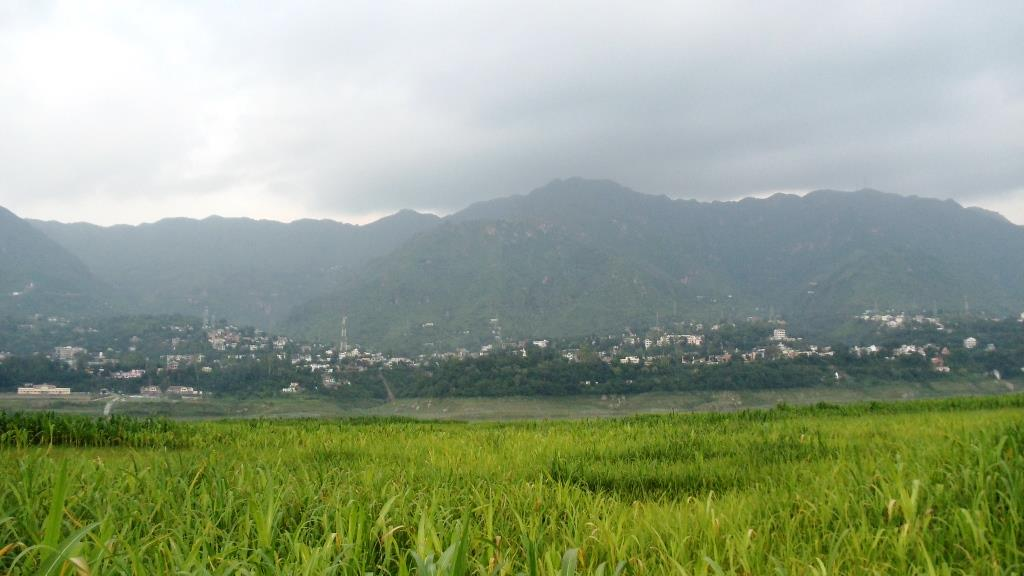
Bilaspur is the main town in the district.

The present town of Bilaspur was built as a planned town in the mid-20th century to replace the old one, which was going to be completely submerged once the Bhakra Dam was completed. It is located on the left (southeast) bank of the Satluj, about 93 km from Shimla, 64 km from Kiratpur, and 95 km from Ropar in Punjab. The Chandigarh-Manali highway passes through Bilaspur, as does another route connecting Shimla to Mandi by way of Bilaspur.

The old town of Bilaspur was founded in the mid-1600s to serve as the new capital of Bilaspur State. It was located on the left (southeast) bank of the Satluj and was originally called "Biaspur" after the legendary sage Vyasa because, before the town's foundation, there was a cave here called Biasgufa (or Vyas Gufa) where Vyasa supposedly stayed during the winter.

New Bilaspur was built on a hillside just above the old town. It was planned with six sectors covering a total of 8.8 km^{2}. The major public buildings — including the town hall, hospital, college and school, and government offices — were grouped together in the Government Sector. Also in this sector was the main industrial estate. Various residential districts were also zoned. Old Bilaspur's temples were relocated to the new town and their idols were installed in a new structure near the bus stand.

Bilaspur is the site of the Nalwari, an annual cattle fair held for 4 or 5 days in March and April. Cattle are brought from surrounding areas, including Nalagarh and neighbouring parts of Punjab, to be sold in Bilaspur. The fair also features racing, wrestling, and other entertainment.

==== Ghumarwin ====
The second-most important town in the district, Ghumarwin, is located about 29 km from Bilaspur on the road to Hamirpur. Ghumarwin is the seat of a tehsil and a development block, and it has a town committee. Among the town's public buildings are a higher secondary school, a rest house, a police station, a primary health centre, and a post office.

==== Naina Devi ====
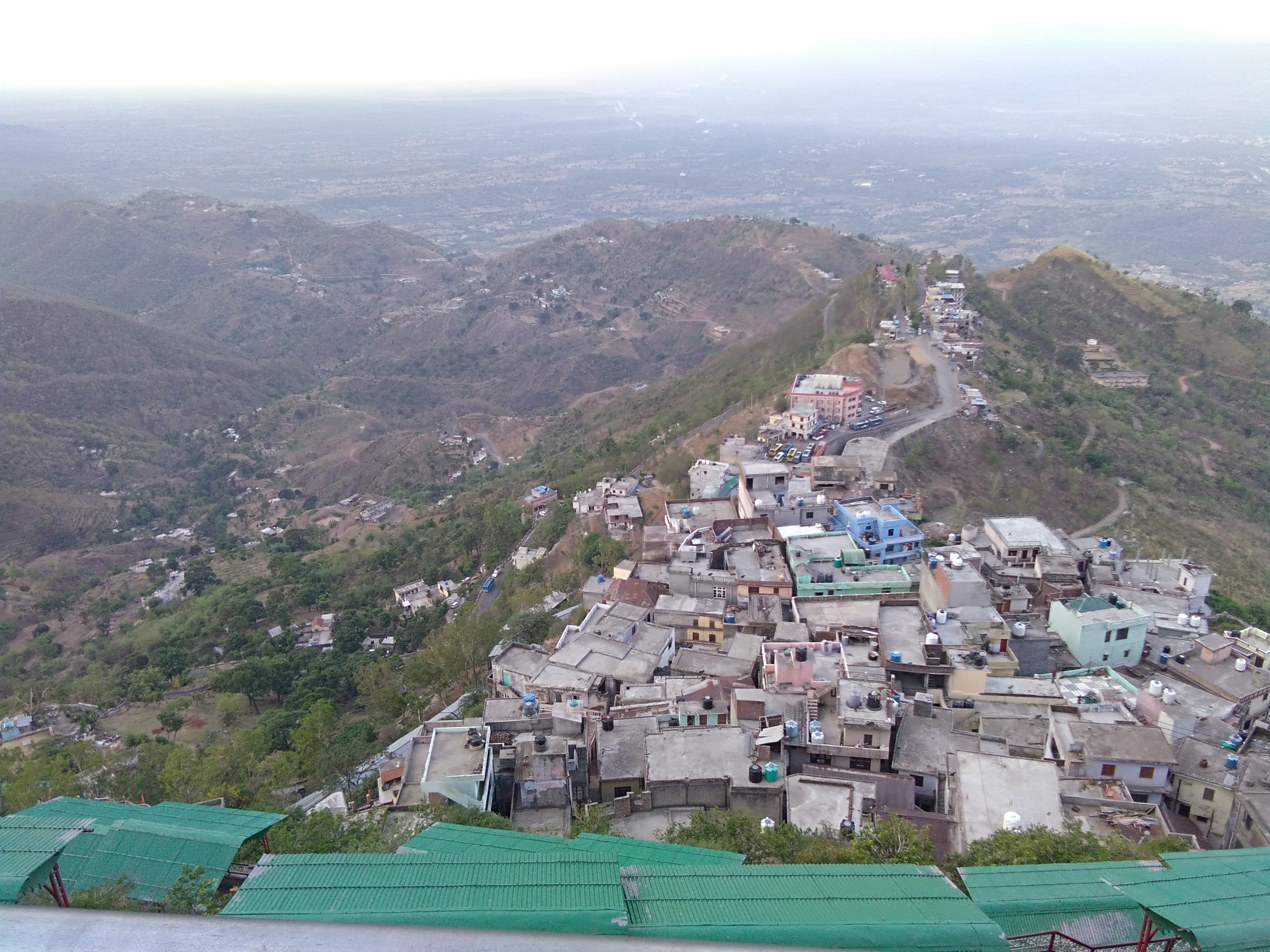
The small town of Naina Devi is clustered beneath the namesake temple at the top of the hill.

Although not very large, Naina Devi has its own town council. The town is mainly known for its temple, which is the most important religious site in Bilaspur district. The temple is above the town — it crowns Naina Devi hill's summit — and a long flight of stone steps connects the two. At the base of the steps is a small bazar. The town also has a municipal rest house, a commercial inn, a middle school, and a Sanskrit pathshala.

=== Villages ===
==== Deoli ====
Deoli, located 13 km from Bilaspur by the road to Mandi, first gained prominence in 1960, when a large mirror carp hatchery was built here on government land. The fish farm covers an area of 4.4 hectares and contains 2 large ponds and 14 smaller nursery ponds. It has an ample water supply from a stream on one side; the Ali khad flows past the farm on the other side. According to statistics from the 1970s, the Deoli fish farm was producing, on average, about 400,000 carp fingerlings annually. These carp fingerlings are used both for stocking Gobind Sagar and for sale to private fish farms. Besides mirror carp, goldfish are also bred here for sale as aquarium fish.

==== Sunhani ====
Although now just a village, Sunhani is historically significant because it was the capital of Bilaspur State from about 1600 until about the 1650s, when the town of Bilaspur was founded. Sunhani is located about 25 km from Bilaspur, on the right bank of the Seer khad.

The Chandel kings had a tradition that wherever they went & settled, they constructed a temple of Nahar Singh Ji (Nar Singh Devta) and worshiped the deity. Thus when they relocated to Sunhani, they built a thakurdwara where they made a Narsingh Devta (there Istdev) temple. On the doors of the thakurdwara, there is Gupta period architecture & drawing. There are many jharokhas on the backside of the thakurdwara featuring sculptures of various gods and goddesses. Today also, people of this area offer new harvest as Nasrawan. Buffalo milk ghee is firstly offered here newly married couple move around Ficus (pipal) tree. Nearby is a temple of Shitla Mata.

==== Namhol ====
Namhol is a small hamlet located about 25 km from Bilaspur on the road to Shimla. It has a small thakurdwara which was built by Raja Amar Chand in 1883 and which contains brass idols of Ram, Lakshman, Sita and Hanuman. There are also various shops, a high school, two dispensaries (one veterinary and one civil), a police post, a branch post office, and a rest house perched atop a ridge with a dramatic descent on either side.

==== Gherwin ====
Gherwin is a hamlet located in the Ghamarwin tehsil, about 28 km from Bilaspur. It is known for the Guga Naumi festival, held annually during the month of Bhadra and lasting for 8 days. There is a temple, a higher secondary school, a dispensary, and a branch post office.

==== Other villages ====
- Khasari
- Zakatkhana

== Landmarks ==
=== Forts ===
==== Kahlur Fort ====
Kahlur Fort, or Kot Kahlur, is located on the Dhar Naina Devi, 3 km from Ganguwal across the border in Punjab. The fort's origins are unclear—there are multiple traditional accounts of its foundation, and they disagree on who built it, when it was built, and where its name came from. One version attributes the fort to Raja Bir Chand, the legendary founder of the Kahlur principality who may have lived around the year 900. This account derives the name "Kahlur" from a Gujjar named Kahlu who was supposedly involved in the fort's construction. Another account attributes both the fort's construction and its name to Raja Kahal Chand, a 6th-generation descendant of Bir Chand. M.D. Mamgain considers this account "dubious" and suggests that, instead, Kahal Chand may have been involved in repairing or expanding the fort.

Today, Kahlur Fort is relatively well-preserved. Its layout is square-shaped, about 30 m long on each side. Its walls are made of stone and are about 2 m thick and 30 m tall. There are two storeys, each about 15 m tall. On the second storey, about 12 m above the floor, there were a series of window-shaped features with small openings so that the garrison could look out and, if necessary, shoot at attackers. Most of these spaces have now been closed with cement or iron mesh. The second storey originally had just a single hall, but in recent decades it has been repurposed as a police armoury and 12 rooms have been built off to the sides to house police personnel. Also on the upper storey is a small temple to Naina Devi with a stone idol.

==== Bahadurpur fort ====
Crowning Bahadurpur hill, the district's highest point, is the Bahadurpur fort. The fort, which the hill is named after, is located close to the village of Tepra and about 40 km from the town of Bilaspur. A mule path connects the fort to Namhol, 6 km below; this is how most traffic historically accessed the fort. The fort itself has a commanding view of the surrounding region: the mountains around Shimla, the plains around Ropar, the Naina Devi hill, the Ratanpur and Fatehpur forts, and Swarghat are all visible from this high vantage point.

The Bahadurpur fort is said to have been built by Raja Keshab Chand around the year 1620. Its ruins are still visible—the basic layout was a circle, which is now marked by a 1 m-tall stone wall. In one 6 m-long section, a much taller portion of the wall is preserved, reaching some 15 meters. Within the walled area is a 3x3x6 m tank, which was probably used to store water for the garrison. Also in the vicinity are the ruins of several buildings constructed under Raja Bijai Chand in the late 1800s or early 1900s to serve as a summer home. These buildings were torn down in 1947 and the building material was sold off. Some piles of stone still exist on the sites where the old buildings stood.

==== Sariun Fort ====
The now-ruined Sariun fort is on the Sariun range, east of Tiun and about 58 km from Bilaspur. According to tradition, it was built by a ruler of Suket State and only later conquered by the rulers of Bilaspur. Around 1800, when the Bilaspur raja Mahan Chand was young and under a regency, Sariun fort (along with Tiun) was captured by the raja of Kangra. The fort's basic design was rectangular and built out of stone, with walls 12 metres tall and 1 metre thick. As with other forts in the district, the walls have openings for the garrison to shoot out at attackers. The main gate faces west. Part of the area inside the walls contains traces of about 15 rooms.

==== Tiun fort ====
The Tiun fort is on the Tiun range, some 55 km from Bilaspur and 110 km from Ghumarwin. The fort's age is unknown, and no traditional account exists to attribute it to a ruler. A possible, but highly speculative, date for its construction may be 1142 Vikrami, or about 1085 CE: a short inscription in the fort's inner wall appears to contain the numbers 1142, which M.D. Mamgain suggests may be the year when the fort was built.

In any case, the fort is old and now in ruins. It consists of a large rectangular structure about 400 m wide and 200 m deep. No roof survives. The walls range from 2 to 10 metres tall. The 2-metre walls are at the rear of the fort, where the ground is naturally higher; the builders just added a short wall on top. The walls taper from about a metre thick at the base to half a metre at the top. Like the Kahlur fort, the walls of Tiun fort have holes for the garrison to see and shoot through. The entrance gate is on the fort's west side; it measures about 3 m tall and 5½ m wide. The interior of the fort was probably divided into a series of rooms, but their walls have collapsed and no trace remains of them.

A square structure, about 2 metres on all sides and about 10 metres tall, probably served as a prison. According to legend, an uncle of Raja Kharak Chand was imprisoned in the Tiun fort, although not necessarily in this structure. There are also two large pits carved into the rock, now almost completely buried, that probably served as a granary for the garrison. Each pit has enough room to store 3000 kg of grain, giving it a total storage capacity of 6000 kg. There are also two large tanks designed to store rainwater. Finally, there are also two temples within the fort complex. One is dedicated to a goddess and is still in use. The other, dedicated to Shiva, is now in ruins.

==== Bachhretu fort ====
The now-ruined Bachhretu fort is on the Kot Dhar range, which is named after the fort. It crowns a hill near the village of Bachhretu, 3 km above Changar Talai and 34 km from the town of Ghamarwin. This spot has a sweeping view of Gobind Sagar and the surrounding hills. According to Achhar Singh, the Bachhretu fort was built under Ratan Chand, who was raja of Kahlur from 1355 to 1406. Ony scattered remains still exist. From them, the fort's basic layout appears to have been a rectangle, about 100 m by 50 m. The outer walls, which still exist in some places, were made of hammer-dressed stone. They were perhaps 20 m tall and about 1 m thick, tapering towards the top. The space inside was divided into various rooms, of which about 15 can still be traced. One room has especially high walls, reaching 10 to 12 metres. Doorways are marked by long stone slabs. There are also two underground chambers, now almost completely buried under the rubble, which were probably used to store grain for the garrison. A water tank is also said to have existed. There is also a small temple with two busts of the goddess Ashta Bhuja ("eight-armed") as well as some images of other deities. A pipal tree (Ficus religiosa) has now also grown within the fort.

==== Baseh fort ====
The Baseh fort is located on the Kot Dhar, about 6 km north of the Bachhretu fort. Like Bachhretu, the Baseh fort is attributed to Raja Ratan Chand. It consists of a rectangular area, about 200x45 m in size, which is divided into three distinct enclosures by high walls that are about a metre thick. One of the enclosures has traces of walls dividing it into rooms. Like other Bilaspuri forts, the Baseh fort contains a tank, which was used to store rainwater for use by the garrison.

==== Fatehpur fort ====
The Fatehpur fort is built on a hill some 45 km from Bilaspur and 3 km from Swarghat. This is near the boundary of the old Bilaspuri principality, and the fort was built to command a strategic position on the frontier. According to local tradition, it was also historically used as a refuge castle where the local population could take shelter. When the fort was built is unknown. It is now heavily dilapidated and its ruins largely consist of scattered piles of stone. The fort's shape may have been a square, about 60 m long on each side. A small part of its walls, about 6 m long, survives; from this, it seems that the fort's walls were about 25 m tall and 2 m thick. As with other forts in the area, this wall has peepholes that defenders could see out of and shoot at attackers. There was also likely a tank, but it is now buried under debris. Local tradition holds that there were 7 fortified outposts outside the main fort; all that remains of these are piles of stones marking their location.

==== Ratanpur fort ====
The Ratanpur fort, also called Ratangarh (or "Ruttungurh"), is about 27 km from Bilaspur, near the Bilaspur-Kiratpur road. It sits atop a peak near the villages of Khui and Jamli. Historically, it was part of the Ratanpur pargana. When it was built is unknown. It saw some action during the Anglo-Nepalese War in the 1810s and was later repaired under Raja Amar Chand in the 1880s, but it is now in poor condition.

==== Chanjiar (aka Jhanjiar) fort ====
About 6 km from Barthin and 20 km from Bilaspur, is the site of a former fort. Originally called Chhatipur (i.e. the fort on the "chest" of Bilaspur), it was built in 1795 by the raja of Kangra when he invaded the Bilaspur principality. The fort no longer exists, and no trace of it is visible today.

=== Other places ===
- Thakurdwara of Auhar, (In the middle of the district Bilaspur). It was an important town of the princely state Bilaspur. Due to its importance Rani Naggar Dei built the Thakurdwara of Auhar. She also constructed on water tank with roof known as chhatwain and an inn for the stay of the travelers. In the Thakurdwara idols of 'Shaligram' and 'Narsingha' were installed. The walls of the temple have several mural paintings. The Language and Culture department has given financial assistance for the repair of the Thakurdwara. edit
- Bhakra Dam, (In Naina Devi Sub-Tehsil about 14 km from Nangal town). The highest straight gravity dam in the world occupies the predominant position amongst the places of tourist interest. The idea for the construction of this dam was conceived by Sir Louis Dane the then Lieutenant Governor of Punjab, who travelled from Sunni to Bilaspur and then onward to Ropar. The project could not make headway due to prohibitive cost of construction. In the year 1938-39 the districts of Rohtak and Hissar of the then Punjab State experienced severe drought resulting in great loss of human life and cattle. The scheme was again mooted out but was not executed due to second world war. It was only after independence in March, 1948 that the work was taken in hand for execution. On the historic day of 17 November 1955 later Prime Minister Shri Jawahar Lal Nehru placed the first bucket of concrete at the foundation. The construction of dam was completed in October, 1962. The height of the dam is 226 metres, length at the top is 518 metres and width 9 metres. It has a length of 99 metres at the bottom and width 402 metres. The project derives its name from two villages Bhakhra and Nangal situated on the foothills of the low Himalayan ranges.
- Kandrour Bridge, (8 kilometres from Bilaspur on National Highway No. 88) Construction for this bridge across the Satluj river was started in April, 1959 and was completed in 1965. The total cost of construction was ₹28,12,998. The span of the bridge is about 280 meters with a breadth of about seven meters and the height above the lowest river bed is about 80 meters. It was once the tallest bridge of Asia. It has provided a link between Ghumarwin town of Bilaspur and Hamirpur district and is a marvellous engineering feat. The pillars supporting the bridge are hollowed. The bridge was opened by the then Minister of Transport, Shri Raj Bahadur in 1965.

== Labour organisations ==
Several labour organisations have their head offices in Bilaspur town, such as the Bilaspur Mazdoor Union, the Himachal Government Transport Workers Union, and the Rosin and Turpentine Factory Workers Union. The Bilaspur Mazdoor Union, the Himachal Government Transport Workers Union, and the Nangal Bhakra Mazoor Sangh are three organisations dealing with labour related to the Bhakra Dam. It was also noted in 1975 that construction workers involved in road building in the district had unofficially formed a sort of loose, informal union.

== Notable individual ==
- Gambhari Devi, folk artist
- Suresh Chandel, politician
- J. P. Nadda, National president of the Bharatiya Janata Party
- Rattan Chand, bureaucrat
- Sanjay Kumar, Param Vir Chakra
- Bhandari Ram, Victoria Cross
- Meena Kumari, International shooter
- Yami Gautam, Bollywood actress

== See also ==
- Bilaspuri
- Naina Devi Wildlife Sanctuary
