= Chanderi, Bhopal =

Chanderi
- village
- Location within Madhya Pradesh Location within India
- Coordinates: 23.4142158°N 77.303723°E
- Country: India
- State: Madhya Pradesh
- District: Bhopal
- Tehsil: Huzur
- Elevation: 539 m (1,768 ft)

Population (2011)
  - Total: 1,620
- Time zone: UTC+5:30 (IST)
- ISO 3166 code: MP-IN
- 2011 census code: 482374

Chanderi is a village in the Bhopal district of Madhya Pradesh, India. It is located in the Huzur tehsil and the Phanda block.

== Demographics ==
According to the 2011 census of India, Chanderi has 369 households. The effective literacy rate (i.e. the literacy rate of population excluding children aged 6 and below) is 71.62%.

Demographics (2011 Census)
	Total	Male	Female
Population	2500	1400	1300
Children aged below 6 years	221	129	92
Scheduled caste	532	277	255
Scheduled tribe	0	0	0
Literates	1002	646	356
Workers (all)	879	533	346
Main workers (total)	838	515	323
Main workers: Cultivators	80	62	18
Main workers: Agricultural labourers	751	453	298
Main workers: Household industry workers	2	0	2
Main workers: Other	5	0	5
Marginal workers (total)	41	18	23
Marginal workers: Cultivators	13	6	7
Marginal workers: Agricultural labourers	20	10	10
Marginal workers: Household industry workers	1	0	1
Marginal workers: Others	7	2	5
Non-workers	741	358	383
