= Chandeleur =

Chandeleur may refer to:

- Chandeleur Islands, off the coast of Louisiana, U.S.
- Candlemas, a Christian observance
- USS Chandeleur (AV-10), U.S. Navy ship of World War II

== See also ==
- Chandelier (disambiguation)
