= Khasari =

Khasari is a village in the Bilaspur district of the Indian state of Himachal Pradesh. It is under the jurisdiction of the Mehrin Kathla panchayat under the Indian panchayati raj system for the governance of villages.

== Demographics ==
The total population of this village is 249 as of 2001, with a roughly equal proportion of males and females. Of this population, 15% is under the age of 18. The literacy rate for this village is 95%, which far outpaces the Indian national average.
