= Bhakra Dam =

Bhakra Nangal Dam
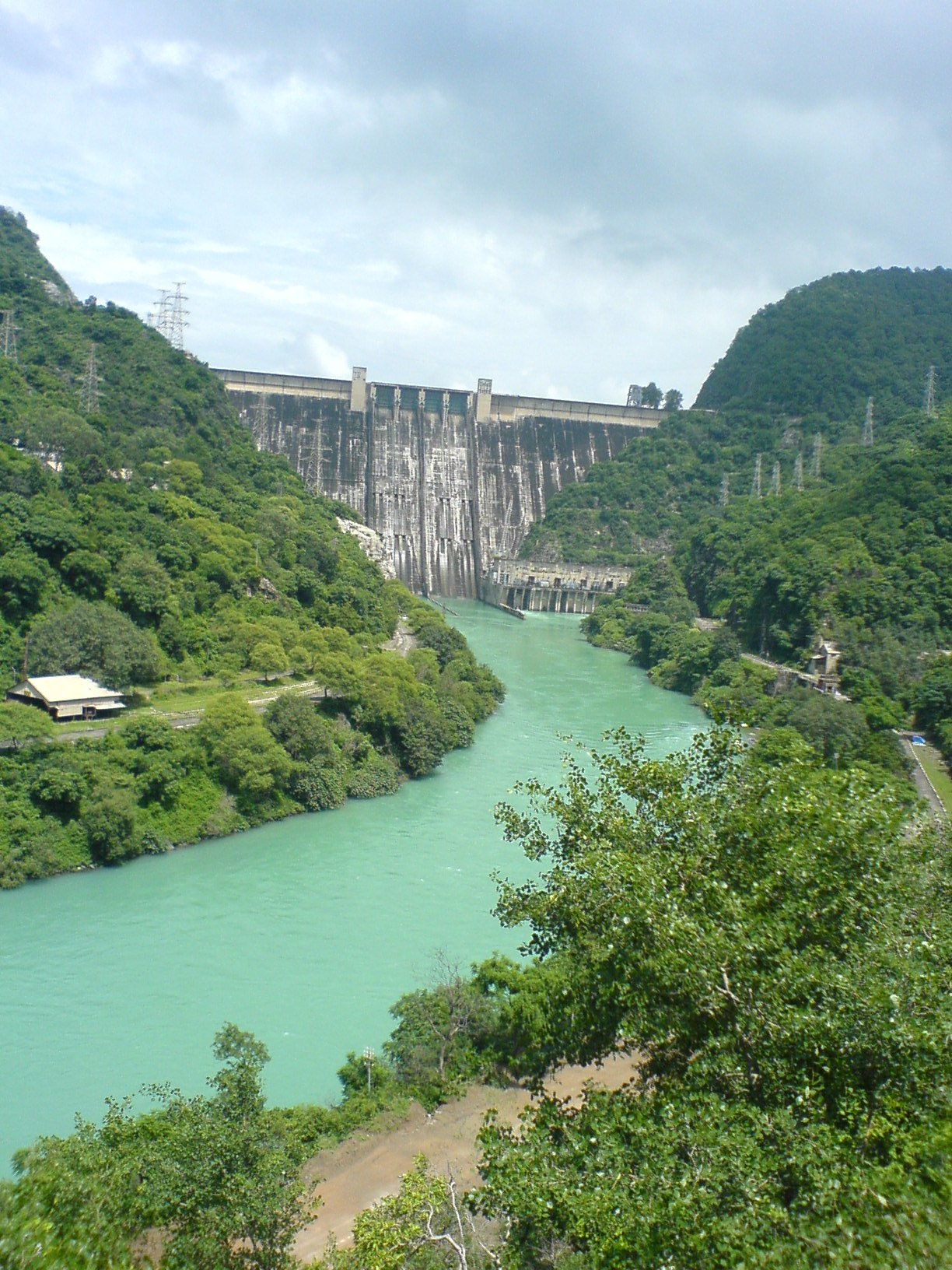
- The Bhakra Dam, Bilaspur district, Himachal Pradesh, India

- Location in Himachal Pradesh Location in India
- Official name: Bhakra Dam
- Location: Bhakra Village, Bilaspur district, Himachal Pradesh, India
- Coordinates: 31°24′39″N 76°26′0″E
- Construction began: 1948; 78 years ago
- Opening date: 1963; 63 years ago
- Construction cost: ₹245.28 crore (equivalent to ₹220 billion or US$2.3 billion in 2026)

Dam and spillways
- Type of dam: Concrete gravity
- Impounds: Satluj River
- Height: 741 ft (226 m)
- Length: 1,700 ft (520 m)
- Width (crest): 30 ft (9.1 m)
- Width (base): 625 ft (191 m)
- Spillway type: Controlled, overflow

Reservoir
- Creates: Gobindsagar Reservoir
- Total capacity: 7.551 million megalitres (266.70 tmc ft)
- Active capacity: 6.007 million megalitres
- Catchment area: 56980 km^{2}
- Surface area: 168.35 km^{2}
- Maximum water depth: 1680 ft

Power Station
- Commission date: 1962–1963
- Turbines: 5 x 108 MW, 5 x 157 MW Francis-type
- Installed capacity: 1325 MW

Bhakra Nangal Dam is a concrete gravity dam on the Satluj River in Bhakra Village in Bilaspur district, Himachal Pradesh in northern India. The dam forms the Gobind Sagar reservoir. Nangal Dam is another dam at Nangal in Punjab downstream of Bhakra Dam. However, sometimes both the dams together are called Bhakra-Nangal Dam though they are two separate dams. It is the tallest gravity dam in Asia. It is also the second tallest dam in Asia.

The dam is located at a gorge near the (now submerged) upstream Bhakra village in Bilaspur district of Himachal Pradesh and is of height 226 m. The length of the dam (measured from the road above it) is 518.25 m and the width is 9.1 m. Its reservoir known as "Gobind Sagar" stores up to 9.34 billion cubic metres of water. The 90 km long reservoir created by the Bhakra Dam is spread over an area of 168.35 km^{2}. In terms of storage of water, it is the third largest reservoir in India, the first being Indira Sagar dam in Madhya Pradesh with capacity of 12.22 billion cubic meters and the second being Nagarjunasagar Dam in Telangana.

Sir Chhotu Ram is regarded as the father of Bakhra Dam. He conceptualised the idea of this dam in early 1923.

Described as the "New Temple of Resurgent India" by Jawaharlal Nehru, the first prime minister of India, the dam attracts tourists from all over India. Bhakra dam is 15 km from Nangal town, Punjab and 106 km from Bilaspur

== History ==
Bhakra Dam bridge
- Coordinates: 31°24′39″N 76°26′00″E

Characteristics
- Total length: 1,700 ft (520 m)
- Width: 30 ft (9.1 m)

Location
- Interactive map of Bhakra Dam bridge

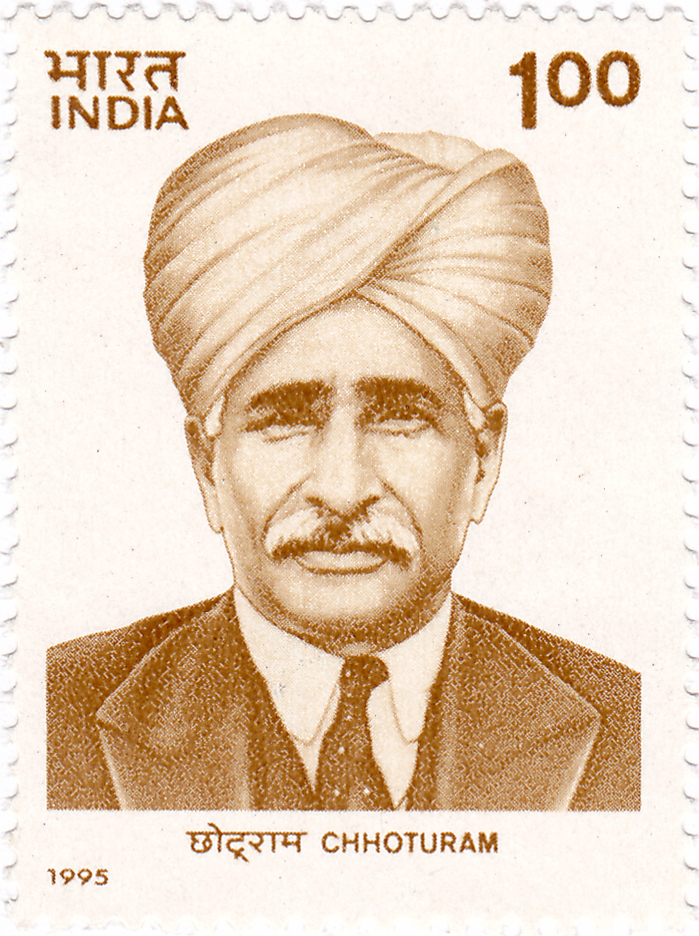
Sir Chhotu Ram, founder of Bakhra Dam. He signed agreement with the Raja of Bilaspur in 1944

The Bhakra-Nangal multipurpose dams were among the earliest river valley development schemes undertaken by India after independence, though the project had been conceived long before India became a free nation. Sir Chhotu Ram is widely regarded as father of the Bhakra Dam. He conceptualised the Bakhra Dam in early 1923. Later, the agreement for this project was signed by the then Punjab revenue minister, Sir Chhotu Ram with the Raja of Bilaspur in November 1944 and the project plan was finalised on 8 January 1945. Preliminary works commenced in 1946. Construction of the dam started in 1948; Jawaharlal Nehru poured the first bucket of concrete into the dry riverbed of the Sutlej on 17 November 1955, as a symbolic initiation of the work. Addressing a gathering there, he said, "This is a gift to the people of India and to the future generations from the workers who built this dam", calling for "raising a memorial" at the dam "in honour" of the workers. The dam was completed by the end of 1963. Successive stages were completed by the early 1970s.

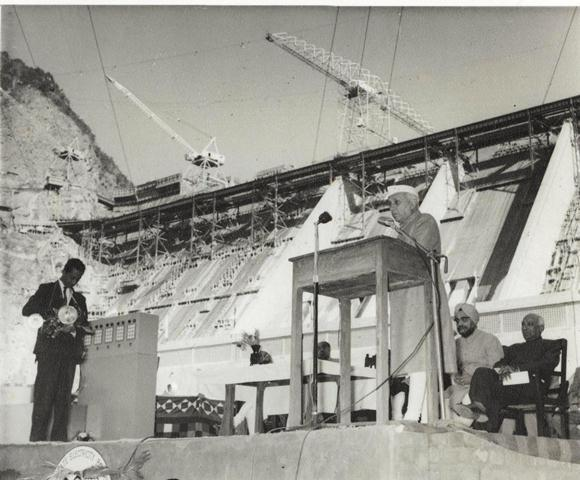
Nehru during the construction of the Dam in the Punjab, 1953

Initially, the construction of the dam was started by Sir Louis Dane, the Lieutenant Governor of Punjab. But the project got delayed and was restarted soon after independence under the chief architect Rai Bahadur Kunwar Sen Gupta. It was meant to be financed entirely by the union government, but when lack of funding from investors and the government had forced Harvey Slocum to almost abandon the project, a contractor named Sir Sobha Singh arrived and funded it with his own money and with the help of Kamani Engineering. The Control Board for the project included representatives from union government, and of the governments of Punjab, Patiala and East Punjab States Union, Rajasthan, Bilaspur and Himachal Pradesh. The dam was built primarily by Indian workers, with the exception of the American Harvey Slocum who consulted on the project and many workers from the United States Bull Shoals Dam project that joined Slocum on the construction of the Bhakra Dam. A small city was constructed to house the U.S. workers. The organisation evolved for the purpose of design and construction was divided into three parts. The Designs Directorate provided the designs and drawings. The Construction and Plant Design Directorate was to look after its execution and installing of the plant, while the Directorate of Inspection and Control ensured that the specifications are accorded to safety requirements were met. In early 1954, Nehru visited the dam to formally inaugurate it. Historian Ramachandra Guha writes:

As he [Nehru] flicked on the switch of the power house, Dakotas of the Indian air force dipper their wings overhead. Next he opened the sluice gates of the dam. Seeing the water coming towards them, the villagers downstream set off hundreds of homemade crackers. As one eyewitness wrote, 'For 150 miles the boisterous celebration spread like a chain reaction along the great canal and the branches and distributaries to the edge of the Rajasthan Desert, long before the water got there'

In October 1963, at the ceremony to mark the dedication of the Bhakra–Nangal project to the nation, Prime Minister Nehru said, "This dam has been built with the unrelenting toil of man for the benefit of mankind and therefore is worthy of worship. May you call it a Temple or a Gurdwara or a Mosque, it inspires our admiration and reverence". On 22 October 2013, the Government of India approved the release of a commemorative stamp to mark the 50th anniversary of the Bhakra Dam. As how successful India was at that time that it was the only dam in Asia which could produce 1500 MW power.

== Features ==
The dam, at 741 ft (226 m), is one of the highest gravity dams in the world (compared to the USA's largest Oroville Dam, at 770 ft). The 166 km^{2} Gobindsagar Reservoir, named after Guru Gobind Singh, is created by this dam, which is the third largest reservoir in India the first being the Indira Sagar Dam and second Nagarjunasagar Dam. The river Satluj used to flow through a narrow gorge between two hills, Naina Devi and Ramgarh, and the site was chosen to dam the river. The large map http://www.lib.utexas.edu/maps/ams/india/nh-43-03.jpg shows the location of the original Bhakra village that was submerged in the lake formed behind the dam.

Bhakra dam was part of the larger multipurpose Bhakra Nangal Project whose aims were to prevent floods in the Satluj-Beas river valley, to provide irrigation to adjoining states and also to provide hydro-electricity. It also became a tourist spot for the tourists during later years because of its huge size and uniqueness.

It also has four spillway gates that are only used when the reservoir exceeds the maximum allowed level.

Nangal dam is a barrage dam that is 10 km downstream of Bhakra dam.

=== Irrigation ===
The dam holds excess waters during the monsoon and provides a regulated release during the year. It also prevents damage due to monsoon floods. The Bhakra Canal fed by this dam provides irrigation to 10 million acres of (40,000 km^{2}) fields in Punjab, Haryana, and Rajasthan.

Water flows from Bhakra Dam downstream Nangal dam where it is controlled and released into Nangal Hydel Channel that later becomes Bhakra Main Line after Ganguwal and Kotla power plants. The Bhakra main line is a canal that mostly supplies irrigation water to the state of Punjab.

=== Electricity generation ===
Bhakra Dam has ten power generators with five on each side. Generators for the left power house were originally supplied by Hitachi, Japan and upgraded to the present capacity by Sumitomo, Hitachi and Andritz. Generators for the right side were originally supplied by Soviet Union and later upgraded to the present capacity by Russia. The two power houses have a total capacity of 1325 MW. The left power house contain 3 x 108 MW and 2 x 126 MW Francis turbines while the right has 5 x 157 MW.

The power generated at Bhakra Dam is distributed among partner states of Himachal Pradesh, Punjab, Haryana, Rajasthan, Chandigarh and Delhi.

Three additional power plants are on the two canals Nangal Hydel Channel and Anandpur Sahib Hydel Channel that originate from Nangal dam. Their generation capacities are : Ganguwal - 77.65 MW, Kotla - 77.65 MW and Anandpur Sahib - 134 MW.

=== Fishing ===
Gobind Sagar Lake (Bhakra Dam Reservoir)

The Gobind Sagar reservoir is home to many fish species including endangered Mahseer. Commercial fishing in the reservoir is a source of revenue for the local population.

== Management ==
Bhakra Beas Management Board (BBMB) was constituted in 1966 for the administration, maintenance and operation of Bhakra Nangal Project from 1 October 1967. It manages the operation of both the dams. Its members are appointed by the government of India and by the states of Punjab, Haryana, Rajasthan, Himachal Pradesh, and Union territories of Delhi, and Chandigarh. Bhakra Management Board was renamed Bhakra Beas Management Board (BBMB) on 15 May 1976 to also manage dams on the river Beas. Since then the Bhakra Beas Management Board is engaged in the regulation of the supply of water and power from Bhakra Nangal Project and Beas Projects to the states of Punjab, Haryana, Rajasthan, Himachal Pradesh, Delhi, and Chandigarh government.

The Bhakra Beas Management Board regulates, operates and manages Bhakra Dam, Dehar Hydroelectric Project, Pong dam, Ganguwal and Kotla power stations.

In June 2026, it was reported that the dam was tilting.

=== Tourism ===
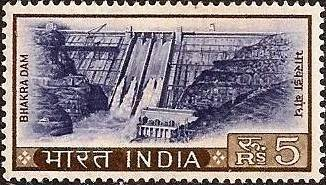
1967 postal stamp

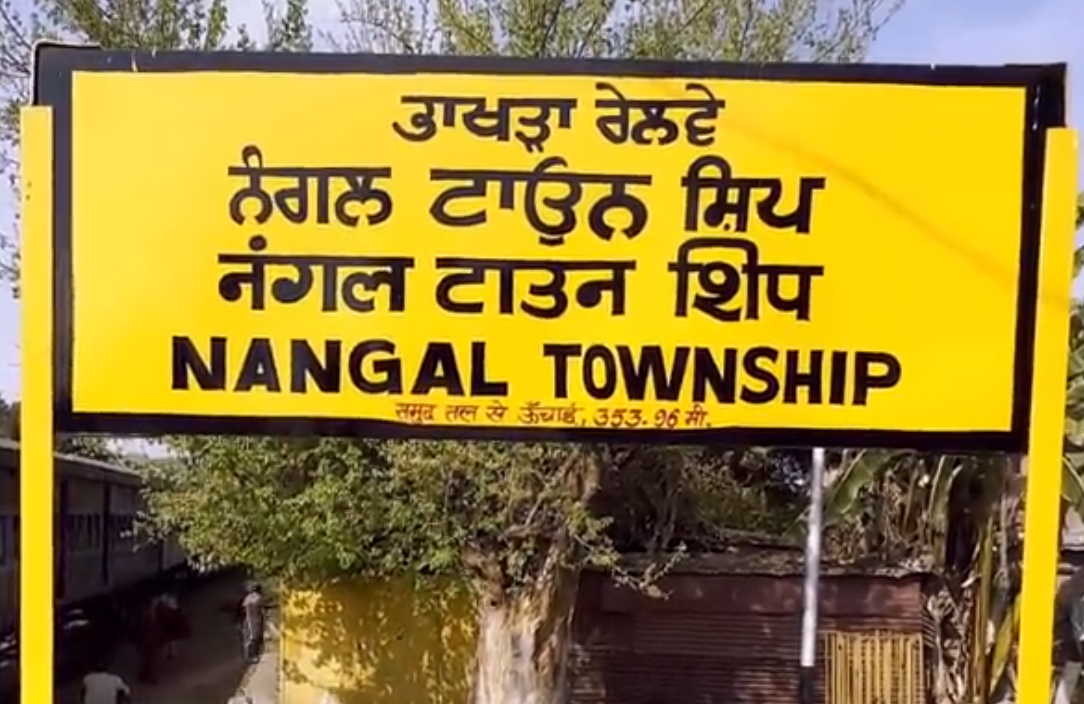
Nangal Township station. Trains originate from here towards Bhakra.

Being the second largest dam in India after Tehri Dam, it attracts a large number of tourists who visit its reservoir and attractive location. However, for security reasons, visitors to Bhakra-Nangal Dam has been banned. Board (BBMB) also run the narrow gauge Bhakra — Nangal Railway line from Bhakhra dam to Nangal dam, just like Darjeeling Himalayan Railway. There are 8 railway stations on this line. Traveling in the train is absolutely free. It is the only such operational railway in India, in which traveling is completely free for the passengers.

== Displacement of people ==
The large reservoir created by the dam displaced a large population from the district of Bilaspur. About 371 villages were submerged. After 50 years of its completion, there is still a question of full resettlement of oustees.

== See also ==
- Dehar hydroelectric project, Pandoh dam
- Koldam Dam – being constructed upstream
- Nathpa Jhakri Dam
- Pong Dam
- Pandoh Dam
- Karcham Wangtoo Hydroelectric Project
- List of dams and reservoirs in India
- Temples of modern India
