= Suresh Chandel =

Indian politician

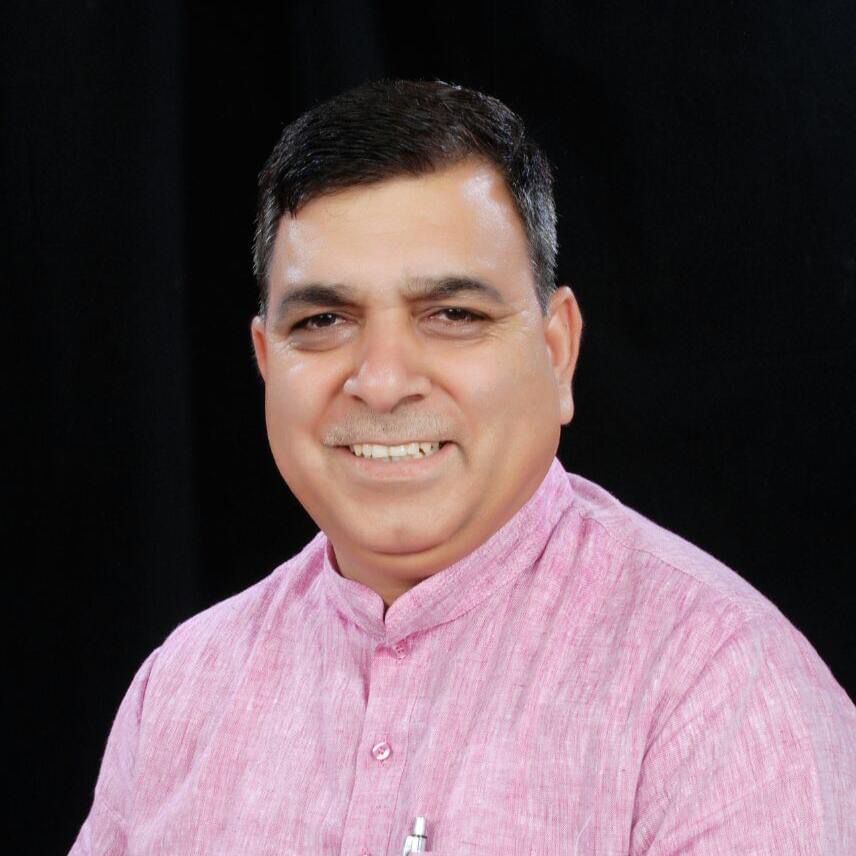

Member of Parliament, Lok Sabha
- In office 1998-2007
- Preceded by: Vikram Singh
- Succeeded by: Prem Kumar Dhumal
- Constituency: Hamirpur

Personal details
- Born: 19 March 1960 (age 66) Bilaspur, Himachal Pradesh, India
- Party: Bharatiya Janata Party
- Spouse: Anita Chandel
- Children: 2 sons and 1 daughter
- As of 9 May, 2006

Suresh Chandel (born 19 March 1960) is an Indian politician. He was a member of the 12th, 13th and 14th Lok Sabhas of India, representing the Hamirpur constituency of Himachal Pradesh as a member of Bharatiya Janata Party.

Chandel was elected three times as a member of parliament. He was state president of Himachal BJP from 1998 to 2000 and presently national Vice President of BJP Kisan Morcha, and Governing body member of Indian council of Agriculture research, he was also Organisation General Secretary of Himachal BJP from 1988 to 1998.

In 2019 shri suresh Chandel joined congress during lok sabha polls, he is still working for himachal pradesh development and will play important role in next himachal assembly polls.
