= Gobind Sagar =

Reservoir in India

Gobind Sagar Lake

- Location within Himachal Pradesh Location within India
- Location: Una District and Bilaspur District, Himachal Pradesh
- Coordinates: 31°25′N 76°30′E
- Type: Reservoir
- Primary inflows: 4.4- 8.0 million cusecs
- Primary outflows: 4.9- 7.0 million cusecs
- Basin countries: India
- Max. depth: 163.07 m (535.0 ft)
- Water volume: 7,501,775 acre⋅ft (9.25 km^{3})
- Settlements: Una And Bilaspur
- References: FAO

Gobind Sagar Lake is a reservoir situated in Una and Bilaspur districts of Himachal Pradesh, India.

Formed by the Bhakra Dam on the river Sutlej, the reservoir is named in honour of Guru Gobind Singh, the tenth Sikh guru. One of the world's highest gravity dams, the Bhakra Dam rises nearly 225.5 m above its lowest foundations. Under the supervision of the American dam-builder, Harvey Slocum, work began in 1955 and was completed in 1962. To maintain the water level, the flow of the river Beas was channelized to Gobind Sagar by the Beas-Sutlej link which was accomplished in 1976.

== Location and other aspects ==
The reservoir lies in the Bilaspur District and Una District. Bilaspur is about 91 km away from the Bhakra Dam. Its name was given by former Chairman of PSEB SardarJi Harbans Singh Somal, in honor of 10th Guru Gobind Singh Ji. In October and November, when the water level of the reservoir is high, a series of regattas are organised by the Tourism and Civil Aviation department.

Gobind Sagar was declared a water fowl refuge in 1962. Fishing is commonly practiced here. It has about fifty one species and sub species. Bangana dero, Tor putitora, Sperata seenghala and Mirror carp are some of the common species found here.

== Water Sports ==
The Govind Sagar Lake, with its 56 km length and nearly 3 km breadth, offers a variety of water-sports activities in collaboration with the Directorate tourism and Civil Aviation and Directorate of Mountaineering and Allied Sports. Due to seasonal water level fluctuation watersports are mainly confined to one half of the year, from August to January. During this period, the activities include swimming, surfing, water-skiing, kayaking, rowing, canoeing, and white water river rafting. Courses are conducted at three levels – beginner, intermediate and advance. For this, the Tourism Department of Himachal Pradesh has constructed a Water Sports Complex in Luhnu Ground, Bilaspur, with boarding, lodging and equipment facilities. River rafting is making Bilaspur a focus for this sport.

== See also ==
- Maharana Pratap Sagar
- Pandoh Lake
- Bhakra Dam
