= Ardhkuwari =

Coordinates: 33°00′29″N 74°56′42″E

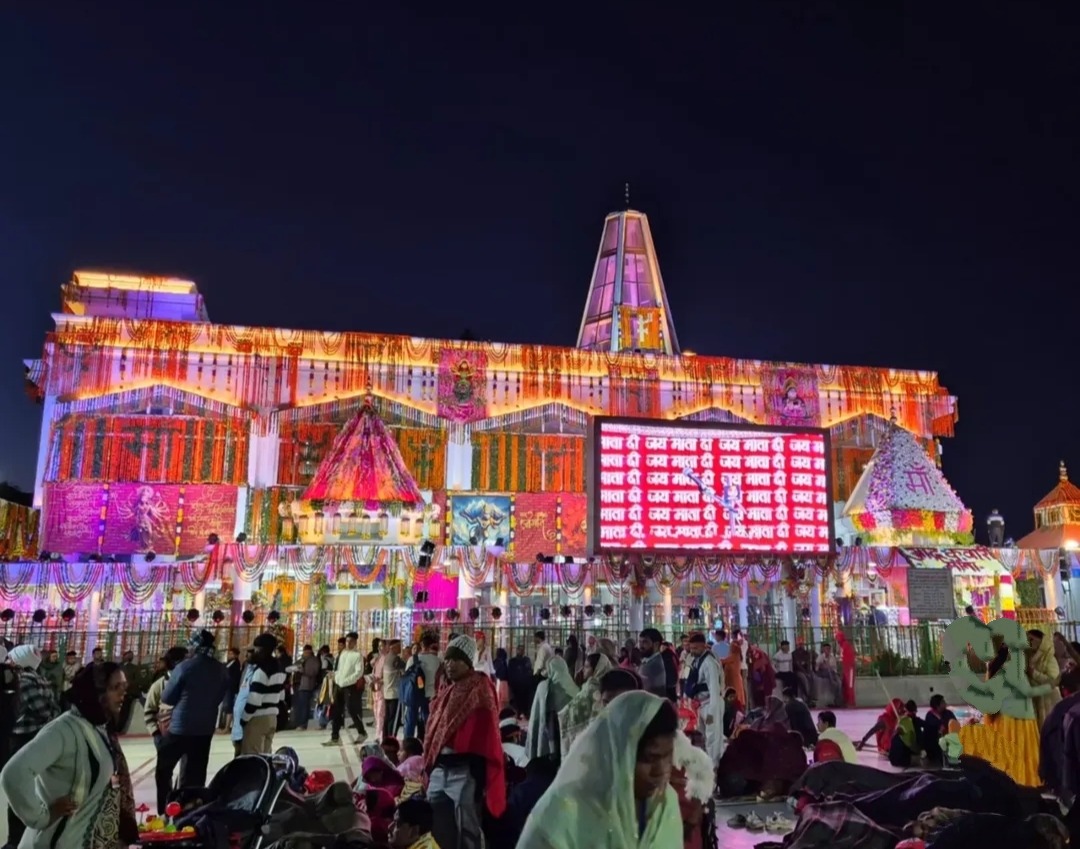

Religion
- Affiliation: Hinduism
- Deity: Vaishno Devi
- Festival: Navaratri

Location
- Location: Katra, Reasi district
- State: Jammu and Kashmir
- Country: India
- Elevation: 4,800 ft (1,463 m)

Ardhkuwari (also spelled Adhkwari or Adi Kumari) is a major holy site and the main resting point on the walk to the Mata Vaishno Devi shrine. It is located in the Trikuta Mountains of Jammu and Kashmir , India. The name means "eternal virgin," "first maiden," or "half married." These names are tied to Hindu stories about the goddess Vaishno Devi.

== Geography and accessibility ==
Situated at an altitude of 4,800 feet above sea level, Ardhkuwari is located exactly 6 kilometers away from the base camp town of Katra, marking the halfway point of the 12-kilometer pilgrimage.

At Ardhkuwari, the walking path splits into two different routes that go to the main Bhawan (temple). The first is the older, steeper path that goes through Sanjichhat. The second is a newer, flatter 5.5-kilometer path that goes through Himkoti. To help pilgrims travel easier, battery-powered cars run on the new path between Ardhkuwari and the Bhawan.

== Garbh Joon cave and mythology ==
The focal point of worship at Ardhkuwari is a highly congested, tunnel-like natural cave known as Garbh Joon (translating to "the womb" or "womb-vagina") According to Hindu legend, the goddess Vaishno Devi was running away from an evil demon named Bhaironath and hid inside this narrow cave. She meditated inside the dark cavern for exactly nine months the same duration a fetus spends in a mother's womb which gave the cave its name, Garbh Joon, and reinforced her vow to remain an eternal virgin.

Pilgrims believe that crawling through the tiny cave is a deep test of faith. They believe that going through it washes away past sins and gives them a spiritual rebirth. However, owing to the extremely narrow space, claustrophobia, and heavy overcrowding, many pilgrims experience fear and ultimately choose not to cross through the Garbh Joon cave.

== Infrastructure and pilgrim facilities ==
Because Ardhkuwari is the main resting spot, the Shri Mata Vaishno Devi Shrine Board has built many facilities to help manage the large crowds and keep people safe. The site has many helpful services:

- Accommodation and shelter: The Shrine Board offers free large halls where pilgrims can sleep overnight. They also have stores that give out free blankets (pilgrims just leave a small security deposit that they get back later). Recently, they built special resting areas that can hold 2,000 pilgrims at once, giving them a quiet place to rest in any weather.
- Food and dining: To keep food clean and cheap, the Shrine Board runs several food shops without trying to make a profit. This includes a large dining hall called Inderprasth Bhojanalaya, which was recently made bigger to feed 200 people at a time. There is also a Langar (a free community kitchen) that serves food that is safe to eat during religious fasting.
- Safety and utilities: The area is kept safe by a base camp of the Central Reserve Police Force (CRPF). If the power goes out, large diesel generators keep the site fully lit. It also has clean bathrooms and a medical clinic for sick or injured travelers.
- Banking: Pilgrims can use banks right on the mountain, including branches of the Oriental Bank of Commerce and the Jammu and Kashmir Bank.

== See also ==
- Vaishno Devi
- Deva Mai
- Charan paduka
- Trikuta
