= Jai Maa Vaishno Devi =

1994 Indian devotional film

- Theatrical release poster of the film
- Directed by: Shantilal Soni
- Written by: Darshan Laad
- Produced by: Gulshan Kumar
- Starring: Aloka Mukherjee; Arun Govil; Gajendra Chauhan; Kiran Juneja; Rakesh Bedi
- Music by: Amar-Utpal; Surender Kohli; Saiyeed Ali
- Production company: T-Series
- Release date: 1994
- Running time: 157 minutes
- Country: India
- Language: Hindi

Jai Maa Vaishno Devi (transl. All hail the Goddess Vaishnavi) (also spelt as Jai Maa Vaishnav Devi during the opening credits of the film) is a 1994 Indian Hindi-language devotional film directed by Shantilal Soni. Produced by Gulshan Kumar under the banner of T-Series, the film is a mythological fantasy drama revolving around the Hindu goddess Vaishno Devi. It features Aloka Mukherjee in the lead role as the goddess, supported by Arun Govil, Gajendra Chauhan, Kiran Juneja, and Rakesh Bedi.

== Plot ==
The narrative opens with the divine incarnation of Vaishno Devi as Princess Trikuta, dispatched to Earth to combat demonic forces and restore righteousness. After her divine upbringing among the gods and gaining Lord Rama's blessing to ascend to heaven, she opts to stay on Earth as Vaishno Devi to protect and guide her followers. Central to the story are Shridhar, a humble yet deeply faithful man, and his loyal wife Sulochana, who endure hardships due to the demon Bhairavnath's malevolent curse, which renders them childless to erode their devotion. Undeterred, Shridhar organizes a grand communal feast in the goddess's honor, seeking her intervention. Bhairavnath's schemes escalate into a direct assault on Vaishno Devi. In the ensuing confrontation, Lord Hanuman intervenes on her behalf, joining forces in a fierce battle against the demon. Vaishno Devi triumphs, vanquishing Bhairavnath. In a moment of grace, she manifests before Shridhar and Sulochana, rewarding their steadfast faith by fulfilling their longing for a child. The film concludes on a note of triumph, emphasizing the power of devotion and the goddess's boundless compassion.

== Cast ==
- Aloka Mukherjee as Vaishno Devi / Trikuta
- Arun Govil as Shri Ram and Bhagwan Vishnu
- Gajendra Chauhan as Shridhar Pandit Ji
- Kiran Juneja as Sulochana Mata
- Rakesh Bedi as Gorakhnath, Bhairavnath's aide
- Girija Shankar as King Ratnakar Sagar
- Rooplata as Goddess Lakshmi and Sita
- Aparajita as Trikuta's mother and wife of Ratnakar
- Dharmesh Tiwari as Devrishi Narad
- Gulshan Kumar as Bhaktraj

== Production ==
The film was produced by Gulshan Kumar through his company T-Series (Super Cassettes Industries Private Limited). Directed by Shatilal Soni, it drew from a screenplay by Darshan Laad. The music, integral to T-Series's devotional output, was crafted by composers Amar-Utpal, Surender Kohli, and Saiyeed Ali, with lyrics penned by Naqsh Lyallpuri, Bharat Acharya, and Gopal Sharma.

== Soundtrack ==
The soundtrack, released by T-Series on 1 November 1994, features devotional songs performed by prominent playback singers including Anuradha Paudwal, Sonu Nigam, and Suresh Wadkar. The compositions are credited to Amar-Utpal, Surender Kohli, and Saiyeed Ali, with lyrics by Naqsh Lyallpuri, Bharat Acharya, and Gopal Sharma.

No.	Title	Singer(s)	Composer(s)	Lyricist(s)
1	"Leke Pooja Ki Thali"	Suresh Wadkar	Amar-Utpal	Naqsh Lyallpuri
2	"Dharti Gagan Mein Hoti Hai"	Suresh Wadkar, Anuradha Paudwal	Amar-Utpal	Naqsh Lyallpuri
3	"O Aaye Tere Bhawan"	Anuradha Paudwal, Sonu Nigam	Amar-Utpal	Bharat Acharya
4	"Mere Nainau Ki Pyas"	Sonu Nigam	Amar-Utpal	Bharat Acharya
5	"Main Hoon Daasi Teri Daatiye"	Anuradha Paudwal	Amar-Utpal	Naqsh Lyallpuri
6	"Hath Jod Ke Khadi Hoon Maiyya"	Anuradha Paudwal	Amar-Utpal	Naqsh Lyallpuri
7	"Tujhe Kab Se Pukare"	Sonu Nigam	Surender Kohli	Naqsh Lyallpuri
8	"Aaja Maa Tainu Ankhiyan Udeek Diyaan" (Female)	Anuradha Paudwal	Surender Kohli	Naqsh Lyallpuri
9	"Aaja Maa Tainu Ankhiyan Udeek Diyaan" (Male)	Sonu Nigam	Surender Kohli	Naqsh Lyallpuri
10	"Do Akam Do"	Anuradha Paudwal, Sonu Nigam	Saiyeed Ali	Gopal Sharma

== Release ==
Jai Maa Vaishno Devi premiered in theaters across India in 1994. It later transitioned to home video formats, including VCD and DVD editions. The film found enduring popularity on television, with broadcasts on channels like Star Utsav as evidenced by a 2013 viewer complaint to the Broadcasting Content Complaints Council (BCCC) over a specific scene. Digitally, it was once streamable on platforms such as Hungama Play.
