= Deva Mai Temple =

Coordinates: 32.9720°N 74.8949°E

Deva Mai
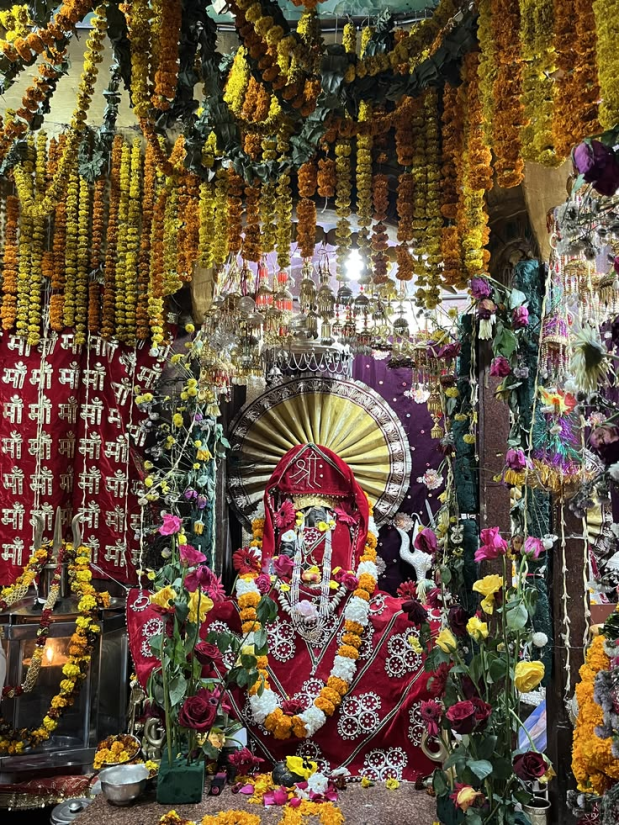

Religion
- Affiliation: Hinduism, Shaktism
- Deity: Vaishno Devi
- Festivals: Durga Puja, Navaratri

Location
- Location: 4 kilometers before Katra on the Jammu-Katra road in the Shivalik mountain range
- State: Jammu and Kashmir
- Country: India
- Interactive map of Deva Mai

Deva Mai (also known as Deva Maai) is a Hindu temple dedicated to the Divine Mother, about 4 kilometres outside Katra in the Reasi district of Jammu and Kashmir, India. Situated in the Siwalik Hills, it is reached via a 3.5 km detour from the main Jammu-Katra highway.

== History ==
=== Role in the Vaishno Devi pilgrimage ===
Deva Mai holds significance as the traditional second "Darshan" (sacred viewing) in the pilgrimage sequence to Vaishno Devi Temple. The yatra typically begins with the first Darshan at Kol Khandoli temple in Nagrota, followed by Deva Mai as the second. The sequence continues through sites such as Charan Paduka, Adh Kunwari, the main shrine at Bhawan (with the Holy Cave), and concludes with the sixth Darshan at the Bhairav temple. These locations, along with natural landmarks like Ban Ganga, are revered as abodes where the Goddess resided during her spiritual journey.

Historically, pilgrims accessed the temple via a walking path from Nomain village, but modern infrastructure has provided a direct road from the highway, making it more accessible.

=== Legend ===
According to temple tradition and accounts preserved by its priests, although Vaishno Devi has resided on Trikuta Mountain since the Treta Yuga, she manifested in the current Kali Yuga at Deva Mai as a young girl to perform her Tapasya. The legend centers on Pandit Shyami Dass, described as a descendant (fourth generation) of the legendary Pandit Shridhar associated with the main Vaishno Devi shrine. Shyami Dass was a devoted pilgrim who traveled daily to the Holy Cave for prayers and refused to eat until completing his pilgrimage. When his wife gave birth to a daughter, Indian tradition imposed a period of impurity called Sutak, during which religious activities are paused. Shyami Dass vowed to extend his fast through the Sutak until he could resume his visits to the cave. That night, the Divine Mother appeared in his dream, revealing that she had been born as his daughter. Faced with the dilemma of how to address her unable to treat her as an ordinary child yet finding it awkward to call his daughter "Mother", he named her Mai Deva. The name is a double entendre: it means "The Mother Divine" while locally translating to "By the Mother's Blessings." It is believed the Goddess remained at this site for 110 years in the form of a young girl, granting blessings to pilgrims. Upon completing her spiritual discipline, she manifested into the idol worshipped today.

Paying obeisance at Deva Mai is considered by many devotees to complete or enhance the overall Vaishno Devi Temple pilgrimage.
