= Rudrasundari =

Form of the Hindu goddess Mahadevi

- Venerated in: Hinduism, Shaktism
- Affiliation: Mahadevi
- Abode: Trikuta
- Mantra: Om Aim Hreem Shreem Kleem, Hreem
- Texts: Devi Bhagavata Purana, Skanda Purana
- Gender: Female
- Consort: Rudra

Rudrasundarī (रुद्रसुन्दरी) is a form of the Hindu goddess Mahadevi. She is mainly known as a Pīṭhadevi, the presiding goddess of a Shaktipeetha a sacred site where the power of the goddess is believed to be especially strong. Her name appears in different Puranas, where she is described as the form of Shakti connected with the Trikuta Pitha (also called Trikatu).

== Etymology ==
The name Rudrasundarī is a Sanskrit compound made of two words:

- Rudra (रुद्र), a name of the god Shiva.
- Sundarī (सुन्दरी), meaning “beautiful woman” or “lovely lady”.

Together, the name can be understood as “the beautiful one linked with Rudra.” Sanskrit dictionaries such as the Monier–Williams Sanskrit–English Dictionary simply record it as the name of a goddess.

== In the Puranas ==
=== Devi Bhagavata Purana ===
The Devi Bhagavata Purana, an important scripture in Shaktism, lists 108 Shaktipeethas in Book 7, Chapter 30. These sacred places are described from verses 53 to 102. In this list, Rudrasundarī is mentioned as the goddess of the Trikuta Pitha, written in Sanskrit as “Rudrasundarī at Trikūṭa” (रुद्रसुन्दरी त्रिकूट).

=== Skanda Purana ===
A similar mention appears in the Sankara Samhita of the Skanda Purana, which also lists Shaktipeethas. Here, Rudrasundarī is associated with a place called “Trikatu,” which is likely another form of the name Trikuta.

== Association with Shaktipeethas ==
=== The Trikuta Pitha ===
Rudrasundarī is mainly connected with the Trikuta Pitha, where she is described as the local form of the Divine Mother. In many traditions, Shaktipeethas are said to be places where parts of Goddess Sati’s body fell, giving the location special spiritual power. Both the Devi Bhagavata Purana and Skanda Purana identify Rudrasundarī as the goddess of this hill-shrine.

=== Location of Trikuta ===
The exact historical location of the Trikuta Pitha is still discussed by scholars. Ancient texts often mix mythology with changing place names. According to Studies in Devi Bhagavata and references from the Bhagavata Purana (Book 8, verse 2.1) and Kalidasa’s Raghuvamsa (Canto 4, verses 51–59), the region called “Aparanta” roughly the Konkan coast and the Western Ghats is linked with Trikuta. The Indologist P. V. Kane suggested that it may refer to the Trirasmi hill near Nashik in Maharashtra.

== See also ==
- Rudra
- Mahadevi
- Vaishno Devi
- Rudrani
