= Vaishno Devi Temple =

Hindu temple in Jammu and Kashmir, India

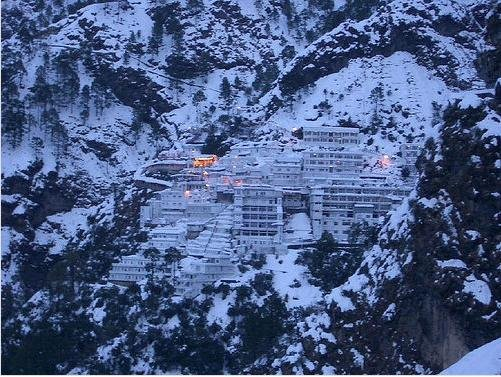
- View of Shri Mata Vaishno Devi Bhavan surrounded by Trikuta Hills in snowfall

- Location of Vaishno Devi in Jammu & Kashmir

Religion
- Affiliation: Hinduism
- District: Reasi
- Deity: Vaishno Devi
- Festivals: Navaratri, Diwali, New Year
- Governing body: Shri Mata Vaishno Devi Shrine Board

Location
- Location: Katra, Jammu and Kashmir
- State: Jammu and Kashmir
- Interactive map of Vaishno Devi Temple
- Coordinates: 33.0299°N 74.9482°E

Architecture
- Type: Cave Temple
- Completed: 0028 Vikram Samvat

Specifications
- Temple: 4
- Elevation: 1,584.96 m (5,200 ft)

Website
- maavaishnodevi.org

The Vaishno Devi Temple, also known as the Shri Mata Vaishno Devi Temple and Vaishno Devi Bhavan, (Note: The word "Bhavan" translates to "mansion" or "abode" in Hindi and Sanskrit. In the context of the pilgrimage, it refers specifically to the main complex housing the holy cave, distinct from the base camp at Katra.) is a Hindu temple in Katra, Reasi district, Jammu and Kashmir. Dedicated to Vaishno Devi, a manifestation of goddesses Mahakali, Mahalakshmi, and Mahasarasvati, it is on Trikuta mountain at an elevation of 5,200 feet (1,500 meters). The temple is 43 km from the main city of Jammu and 29 km from the district headquarters Reasi town. The temple is governed by the Shri Mata Vaishno Devi Shrine Board (SMVDSB) and has been chaired by the Governor of Jammu and Kashmir since August 1986.

It is one of the most popular Hindu pilgrimage sites in India, with millions of devotees visiting the temple annually. In 2023 the board reported 9.52 million pilgrims.

== History ==
=== Early origins and cultural synthesis ===
The shrine originally began as a sacred site for local tribes who worshipped the region's natural geography. The mountain's three prominent peaks were revered as the goddess "Trikuta Devi", a name that was used for centuries. Following migrations into the Jammu region around the 12th century (after the 1192 Battle of Tarain), a cultural synthesis took place. During this period, the local deity Trikuta Devi gradually became identified with the goddess Vaishno Devi. However, the original name remained in common use for a long time; 19th-century European travelers, including G.T. Vigne in 1842 and Sir Richard Temple in 1859, still referred to the deity as "Trikuta Devi" or "Trikuta Mai".

=== Medieval period and royal patronage ===
For much of its early history, the pilgrimage to the shrine was largely limited to ascetics and local residents due to the dense forests and difficult terrain. However, historical records indicate that regional rulers occasionally made the journey. According to the 1847 royal chronicle Rajdarshani by Ganeshdas Badehra, Raja Jas Dev of Jammu visited the shrine in 996 CE.

In the 18th century, Maharaja Ranjit Dev of Jammu visited the shrine to seek blessings prior to a political trip to Lahore. Following his visit, he established the first formal facilities for pilgrims, including water stations and temporary shelters.

=== Modern history ===
Although the Vaishno Devi temple is now the most popular Devi shrine in the region, its popularity is relatively recent. In 1971, when Inderjit Bhardwaj did a study of Devi shrines in the Sivalik Hills, he did not mention the Vaishno Devi temple as particularly important.. Its popularity increased rapidly after an expansion was done in 1976 so that it could accommodate up to 5,000 visitors per day. By 1981, annual visitors to the shrine were about 900,000; by the early 1990s, the number had increased to over 3 million, and the Vaishno Devi temple had become by far the most popular Devi temple in the region. By 2007, the annual number of pilgrims was about 7.5 million. In June 2007, in order to reduce congestion and improve security, the Shrine Board reduced the limit on the number of visitors allowed per month.

The Vaishno Devi temple was in existence by 1846, when Maharaja Gulab Singh established the Dharmarth Trust to manage several temples in his territory; the Vaishno Devi temple was part of this trust. The trust remained in the hands of Gulab Singh's descendants after independence, and his descendant Karan Singh was responsible for administering the temple as the hereditary trustee until 1986, when Jagmohan, then governor of Jammu and Kashmir, passed legislation transferring control of the Vaishno Devi temple from the Dharmarth Trust and the hereditary priests to a separate Shrine Board.

== Legends ==
The temple, at a height of 1,585 metres (5,200 ft) is 12 km from Katra on Trikuta hill. It is about 61 km from Jammu city. Geological studies show that the Trikuta Hills are primarily made of limestone and formed during the Precambrian era. A geological survey cited by the Shrine Board suggests that the holy cave is close to one million years old. (Note: The Shrine Board cites geological surveys for the age of the physical limestone cave formation, human worship and pilgrimage at the site are historically documented to have begun much later.) There is also a mention of the Trikuta hill in Rigveda, the place where the temple is located.

The Mahabharata, which gives the account of the Pandavas and the Kurukshetra War, references the worship of Vaishno Devi. Before the Kurukshetra War, Arjuna is said to have worshipped Durga by the advice of Krishna for the blessings. Pleased by his devotion, the goddess appeared in front of him in the form of Vaishno Devi. When she appeared, Arjuna started praising her with a stotra, in which a verse references a goddess residing in a mountainside temple in 'Jambhu,' believed to be the ancient name for Jammu. Former Governor of Jammu and Kashmir Jagmohan says, "the Mata Vaishno Devi shrine is an ancient one whose antiquity is pre-Mahabharathan, Lord Krishna is believed to have advised Arjuna to go up in the hills of 'Jambhu' and seek the blessings of Vaishno Devi before taking up arms in the battlefield. 'Jambhu' is identified with present-day Jammu. Arjuna while worshipping Vaishno Devi, calls her highest yogi who is free from decrepitude and decay, who is the Mother of the Vedas and the Science of Vedanta and who is giver of Victory and personification of victory itself". According to popular belief, the first temples at Kol Khandoli and Bhawan were established by the Pandavas to express their gratitude to the goddess. Near Trikuta Mountain, there is also a neighboring peak with five stone structures that traditionally represent the Pandavas.

=== Encounter with Rama ===
As per the temple’s legend, Vaishnavi once met Rama in the forests of Trikuta Hills during his exile. She expressed her wish to marry him, but Rama, bound by his vow of having only one wife and already being wedded to Sita, declined. However, he promised that he would return to her in the form of Kalki, the tenth incarnation of Vishnu, who would be born in Kali Yuga, and marry her then. Rama asked her to continue her penance in the cave of Manik (Trikuta) mountains, meditating and blessing devotees until the arrival of Kalki. As per Rama's wishes, Vaishnavi took residence in the holy cave where Mahakali, Mahalakshmi Vaishnavi, and Mahasaraswati reside, where she is now worshipped as Vaishno Devi.

=== The discovery of the shrine by Pandit Shridhar ===
According to one widely circulated local legend, the cave shrine was revealed around the 10th century CE to a Brahmin priest, Pandit Shridhar, who lived in the village of Hansali near present‑day Katra. In this tradition, the deity was venerated as 'Trikuta Devi', named after the three-peaked mountain on which the cave stands, before later being identified more broadly as Vaishno Devi.

== Pilgrimage ==
Some of the key sacred spots along the route to Vaishno Devi include Ban Ganga, Ardhkuwari, Charan paduka, Ganesh Matha and Sanjichhat, with Bhaironath Temple being another important halt on the return journey. According to popular belief, a pilgrimage to Vaishno Devi is considered incomplete unless devotees visit the Bhaironath Temple while returning from the Bhawan. Among devotees, there is a widely held belief that a journey to Vaishno Devi takes place only when the goddess herself calls the pilgrim, a notion often expressed in the saying that the bulava (divine call) comes from Vaishno Devi. It is commonly said that once this call is received, a person need only take the first step and the rest of the pilgrimage unfolds through her grace. At the same time, many believers hold that without such a call, no one, regardless of status or power, can reach the shrine or receive her blessings.

== The Holy Cave of Vaishno Devi ==
The original holy cave is approximately 98 feet (30 m) long and is characterized by a narrow, watery pathway that pilgrims traverse to reach the inner sanctum. This is the only shrine of its kind in the country. The deity is worshipped inside a cave that is about 100 feet long and difficult to reach. Pilgrims entering this cave wade through an ankle- to calf-deep stream of clear water known as the Charan Ganga, which is traditionally believed to flow from near the pindis (abstract forms of the goddess).

Further inside the cave, past rock formations identified by devotees as symbols of various deities such as Shesha, and near a havana kunda and natural shapes resembling a conch, discus, mace, and lotus, the passage culminates at a platform housing the three holy pindis. These three natural, rounded stone formations are revered as manifestations of the goddesses Mahakali, Mahalakshmi (often identified with Vaishno Devi), and Mahasaraswati. Next to the pindis is a natural rock formation interpreted by devotees as the full hand of the goddess raised in the ardha hasta mudra (half-hand gesture). Some traditions venerate this as the fallen hand of the goddess Sati and therefore regard the cave as a Shakta pitha.

According to devotional literature and the Shri Mata Vaishno Devi Shrine board, devotees believe that approximately 330 million gods and goddesses have worshipped the goddess within this holy cave and have left symbolic marks on its walls. Because of the large number of visitors, often reported as up to about 20,000 pilgrims per day, artificial tunnels have been constructed alongside the original cave to facilitate the darshan of the pindis.

== Shakta pitha ==
Vaishno Devi Gufa (also known as Vaishno Devi Bhawan) is one of the 108 Shakta pitha, sacred sites dedicated to the worship of Shakti, the divine feminine energy in Hinduism. According to scholarly articles, two primary traditions circulate regarding the origin of this peetha. The first asserts that the "skull of Sati fell here," establishing the shrine as the "holiest of all Shakta pithas." A competing tradition claims that it was Sati's "right arm" that fell at the site. This "right arm" narrative faces active contestation, with scholarly sources noting that "some scriptures do not agree" and proposing instead that "Gandarbal in Kashmir is the place where the right arm of Sati had fallen."

For devotees, the "right arm" claim gains strong substantiation from a distinctive physical feature inside the holy cave: "stone remains of a human hand," popularly interpreted as varadahasta (the hand that grants boons and blessings) or abhayahasta (the gesture of succour). This natural rock formation is viewed as a tangible manifestation of the mythological event, providing material evidence that bolsters the tradition among pilgrims.

== Scholarly analysis ==
- Diana L. Eck: In her 2012 book India: A Sacred Geography, Harvard Indologist Diana L. Eck portrays the Vaishno Devi shrine as a crucial node in the expansive sacred landscape of India. Eck vividly describes the goddess taking residence on "Trikuta, the Triple Peak," where she "hollowed out a cave there with her trident."
- Abha Chauhan: In her 2011 sociological study Sacred Landscape and Pilgrimage: A Study of Mata Vaishno Devi, Abha Chauhan examines the pilgrimage route as a "sacred landscape" in its own right. Her analysis highlights the ritualistic and cultural significance of key stops along the trek, such as Himkoti and Sanji Chhat, portraying them as integral elements of a holistic spatial and performative experience that transforms the journey into a profound act of devotion.

== Deities ==
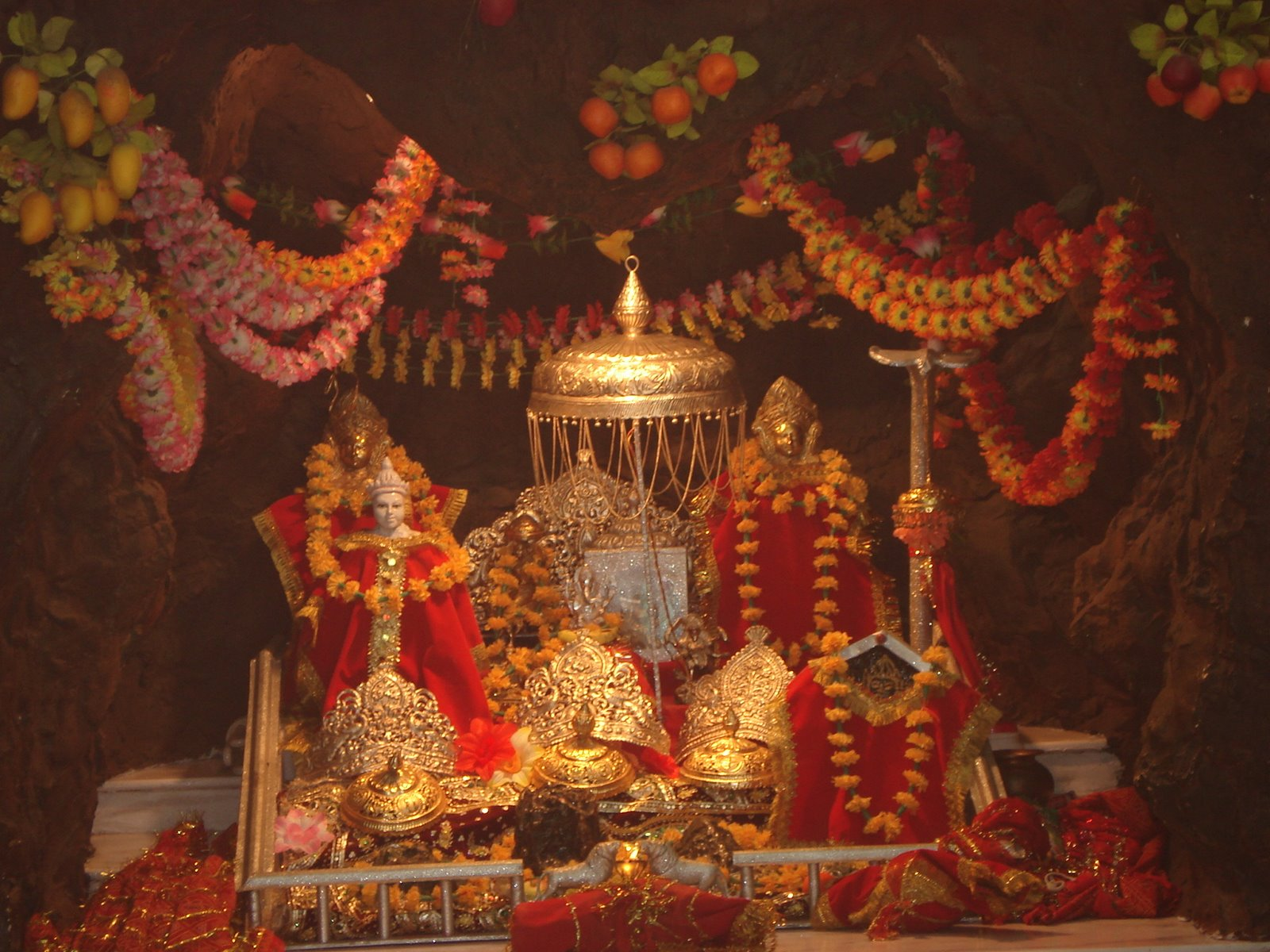
The icons of Mahalakshmi, Mahakali and Mahasaraswati in the temple

The three icons and idols — Mahakali (goddess of destruction), Mahalakshmi (goddess of wealth) and Mahasaraswati (goddess of intellect), all images of Vaishno Devi, are worshipped at the temple. The feet of the icons are washed by the water brought from the perennial flowing river Charan Ganga.

== Worship ==
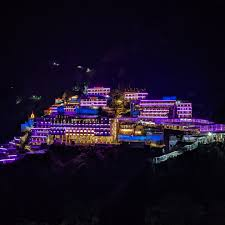
Mata Vaishno Devi Bhawan

Author Pintchman identifies with great goddess Mahadevi and says Vaishno Devi contains all powers and is associated with the entire creation as Mahadevi. The shrine attracts pilgrims from a wide range of social and regional backgrounds, with visitors coming from across India and from overseas, and is not restricted to any single community or caste.

Historically, the ritual of Aarti at the shrine consisted of traditional elements such as the ringing of bells and the chanting of devotional slogans. In recent years, the Shri Mata Vaishno Devi Shrine Board (SMVDSB) has modernized these practices to accommodate increasing pilgrim participation and feedback. To facilitate wider access to the rituals, the Board published an official book of the Aarti and introduced digital initiatives, including online darshan services. These technological advancements allow devotees to view the shrine's rituals remotely from any location.

The temple receives an estimated annual $16 million according to some authors and has received over 1,800 kg of gold, 4,700 kilos of silver, and ₹2,000 crore (US$210 million) cash in the last two decades (2000–2020) as donation.

== Festivals ==
The most prominent festivals held at Vaishno Devi Temple are Navaratri, a nine nights festival celebrating Devi's victory over evil demons and Diwali, a festival of lights symbolizing the victory of light over darkness, good over evil, and knowledge over ignorance.

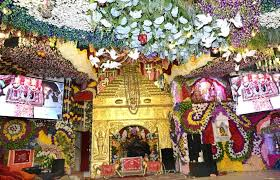
Vaishno Devi Bhawan cave area decorated during Navaratri

The Navaratri festival is a festival celebrated during the month of Ashvin, which typically falls in the Gregorian months of September and October.

== Recognition and significance ==
The Vaishno Devi shrine is one of the most visited Hindu pilgrimage sites in India, attracting millions of devotees annually. According to official data from the Shri Mata Vaishno Devi Shrine Board, the shrine receives over 8 million pilgrims each year, making it one of the busiest religious destinations in the country.

The shrine is also regarded as one of the most prominent pilgrimage centres in the Himalayan region, comparable to other major shrines such as Amarnath and Kedarnath. Its well-developed infrastructure, including paved trekking routes, helicopter services, and digital registration systems, has made it a model for pilgrimage management in India.

In addition, the shrine is among the highest-earning religious institutions in India, receiving substantial donations from devotees, which are utilised for infrastructure development and welfare activities.

== Administration ==
=== Historical administration ===
The earliest known administrative documentation regarding the shrine dates to the 11th century. Historical revenue records and official documents indicate that the shrine was managed by the Baridars, who are recognized as the descendants and associates of Pandit Shridhar. In 1007 CE (1064 Bikrami Samvat), Raja Kirpal Dev issued a formal patta (land deed) to the Baridar community. This document officially established their claim and legal right to manage the shrine and collect its offerings.

=== Modern administration ===
Before 1986, the steep and uneven path, along with the absence of basic facilities, made the pilgrimage difficult for many devotees. In 1986, the Shri Mata Vaishno Devi Shrine Board took over the management of the holy cave to improve administration and upgrade facilities for pilgrims. The Vaishno Devi Temple was included in the Jammu and Kashmir Shri Mata Vaishno Devi Shrine Act No. XVI/1988 and also part of Article 26 of the Constitution of India. The name of the administrating and governing board is the Shri Mata Vaishno Devi Shrine Board. There are nine members in the board; all are nominated by the Government of Jammu and Kashmir, particularly by Lieutenant Governor of Jammu and Kashmir. The Governor of Jammu and Kashmir is the ex-officio chairman of the board. In 1991, Shri Mata Vaishno Devi Shrine Board management also took the control of Shiv Khori, a Shiva temple, but administration of the Shiv Khori temple has since been handed over to a separate shrine board in 2008, Shiv Khori Shrine Board, The quantitative impact of the 1986 administrative takeover is shown by:

- Pilgrim growth: The number of pilgrims visiting the shrine grew exponentially. In 1986, the year of the takeover, the number of pilgrims was recorded at 13.96 lakhs (1.396 million). By 2011, this number had increased more than sevenfold to 101.15 lakhs (10.115 million).
- Demographic profile: The nature of this pilgrimage is non-local. Data from the early 2000s (2000-2006) shows a stable demographic ratio of approximately 87% non-local pilgrims (from outside Jammu and Kashmir) to 13% local pilgrims.
- Socio-economic impact: The 87% of "outside" pilgrims require multi-day lodging, food, and transportation, fuelling the economy of the town of Katra. The 13% of "local" pilgrims are more likely to be day-trippers who do not contribute to the same economic extent.

== Activities by SMVDSB ==
The Shrine Board is responsible for governing and administering the entirety of the Vaishno Devi tracks and temples. The temples under the board include the main Bhawan complex, the Ardhkuwari temple, the Bhairon temple, and the other temples on the tracks.

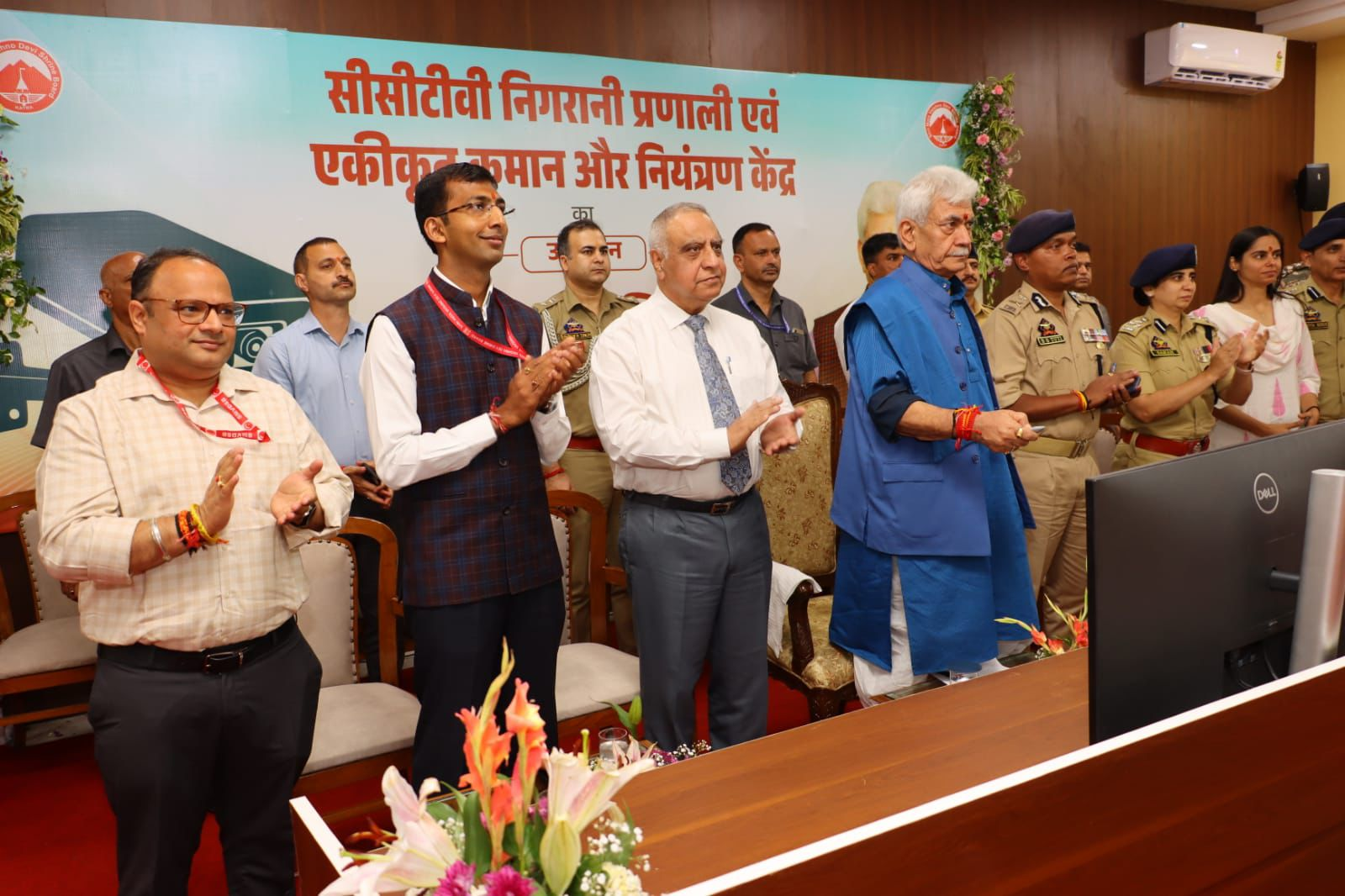
SMVDSB chairman Manoj Sinha at an inauguration

The Shrine Board has set up guest houses and accommodation facilities. These include the Niharika complex, Aashirwad Bhawan, Trikuta Bhawan, and Shakti Bhawan at Katra. A Spiritual Growth Centre is also run by the Shrine Board in Katra, where facilities include an auditorium, conference hall, amphitheatre and library. At Bhawan, the shrine board has developed the Kalika Bhawan, Shridhar Bhawan, Gauri Bhawan, Vaishnavi Bhawan, Manokamana Bhawans, Durga Bhawan, etc. for pilgrim accommodation. Other accommodations are run by the board on the tracks, such as the Shubhra Bhawan at Banganga and Bhawans at Ardhkuwari. In Jammu, the Shrine Board has constructed the Kalika Dham, Saraswati Dham, and Vaishnavi Dham near the Jammu Railway Station. The Shrine Board runs a souvenir and prasad shop at the Jammu airport.

The Shrine Board has also constructed and maintains a sports complex in Katra town, which includes badminton and tennis courts along with a gymnasium and a sports stadium. The sports complex has produced sportspersons like Sheetal Devi and Rakesh Kumar, both of whom won bronze medals at the Paris Paralympics in 2024.

The Shrine Board is the patron of the Shri Mata Vaishno Devi Narayana Super Speciality Hospital in Katra, which is run in collaboration with Narayana Health. The Shrine Board also runs a medical college, the Shri Mata Vaishno Devi Institute of Medical Excellence and a nursing institute, the Shri Mata Vaishno Devi College of Nursing at Katra town. The Shrine Board oversees the Shri Mata Vaishno Devi University and runs a gurukul for secondary students at Banganga.

The shrine board operates battery vehicle services on the Bhawan-Himkoti-Ardhkuwari route, especially for senior citizens and persons with disabilities who receive special quotas for the service. The shrine board also operates helipads at Sanjhichhat and Panchi on the yatra track and at Katra, allowing pilgrims to reach Bhawan via air. A cablecar service has been in operation since 2018 for transporting pilgrims along the Bhawan-Bhairon route.

The shrine board also operates a nursery for plant conservation and undertakes drives for afforestation of the Trikuta hills. The shrine board also publishes a quarterly newsletter, Trikuta, to inform the public of its developmental works and on yatra statistics.

The primary challenge created by this mass pilgrimage is the extreme environmental stress on the Trikuta Hills, leading to significant geological and safety risks. A series of events in 2025 provides a case study of this central challenge and the Board's multi-pronged response. On August 26, 2025, a devastating landslide struck at Adhkuwari, a critical juncture on the Vaishno Devi pilgrimage route, killing 35 pilgrims and underscoring the terrain's vulnerability to natural hazards. The tragedy prompted swift legal repercussions: a Jammu resident lodged a criminal complaint demanding the filing of a First Information Report (FIR) against officials of the Shri Mata Vaishno Devi Shrine Board (SMVDSB), including CEO Sachin Kumar Vaishya, on charges of "criminal negligence." The allegations centered on the Board's purported failure to issue advisories or halt the yatra despite explicit weather warnings and a "red alert" from the Meteorological Department and the Jammu and Kashmir Union Territory Disaster Management Authority (JKUTDMA). In response, a Katra court directed the police to submit an "Action Taken Report," intensifying scrutiny on the shrine's disaster preparedness protocols.

Earlier, on April 8, 2025, the SMVDSB entered into a tripartite Memorandum of Understanding (MoU) aimed at enhancing slope stability along the yatra route. The agreement involved the Shrine Board, THDC India Limited (THDCIL) as the technical consultant for geotechnical evaluations, and the Geological Survey of India (GSI) for comprehensive geological surveys, signaling a forward-looking commitment to engineering safeguards.

In June 2025, the Board issued an electronic Notice Inviting Tender (e-NIT) for an afforestation drive leveraging drone technology. The project targets the seeding of 183 hectares across the "hard-to-reach terrains" of the Trikuta Hills, employing aerial seed dispersal to foster vegetation cover, combat soil erosion, and bolster environmental resilience in the ecologically fragile zone. These measures reflect the ongoing tension between the shrine's popularity and the need for sustainable management in a changing climate.

== See also ==
- Ardhkuwari
- Charan paduka
- Deva Mai Temple
- Kol Khandoli
- Jhandewalan Temple
- Kheer Bhawani Temple
- Amarnath
- Raghunath Temple
