= Saat Behna (seven sister goddesses) =

Group of goddess shrines in North India

The name Saat Behna translates to "Seven Sisters." It refers to a group of goddess shrines found in the hills of North India. These shrines are located in states like Himachal Pradesh, Jammu & Kashmir, Punjab, and Haryana. Local people believe these goddesses are sisters. They are part of a regional folk tradition. This means the stories come from local culture and oral tales, not always from main Hindu religious books like the Vedas. Devotees believe these goddesses talk to each other and visit each other's hills. These seven shrines are highly sacred to Punjabi Hindus who often conduct important rites at these sites such as the first haircut of a newborn baby, the first pilgrimage after marriage, and annual Navaratri pilgrimages.

== Regional Tradition ==
This tradition is most famous in the Shiwalik hills (the foothills of the Himalayas). People here call the goddess "Pahadavali" (She of the Mountains). The hills are seen as the home of the divine family. Unlike some other Hindu traditions where one goddess is supreme, here the goddesses are seen as a family of siblings. They have different personalities. Some are kind, and some are fierce.

The list of the seven sisters can change depending on the village or region. However, the most common list is this:

No.	Goddess	Location	Description
1	Vaishno Devi	Katra, Jammu & Kashmir	The Goddess Of Hills and the "Elder Sister".
2	Jwala Ji	Kangra, Himachal Pradesh	The goddess of fire, worshipped as a natural flame.
3	Naina Devi	Bilaspur, Himachal Pradesh	The goddess of eyes.
4	Chintpurni	Una, Himachal Pradesh	The goddess who takes away worry (also called the Headless Goddess).
5	Kangrawali Devi	Kangra, Himachal Pradesh	Also known as Vajreshvari or Brajreshwari .
6	Chamunda Devi	Kangra, Himachal Pradesh	The warrior goddess who killed demons.
7	Mansa Devi	Panchkula, Haryana	The goddess who fulfills wishes.

As noted by academic sources, modern Hindi pamphlets often expand this list to "Nau Devi" (Nine Goddesses) to align with the nine days of Navratri, adding goddesses like Shakumbhari or Kalika to the core seven. However, the core identity of the "Seven Sisters" remains strongest in the hill districts of Kangra and Jammu.

== Vaishno Devi: The Elder and Most Powerful Sister ==
In this folk tradition, Vaishno Devi is considered the "Elder Sister" (Badi Behen) and the most powerful of the group. Scholars Georgana Foster and Robert Stoddard have studied this topic. They state that Vaishno Devi is designated as the "Elder Sister" among the shrines in the Shiwalik belt.

There are two main reasons for this belief:

- Vegetarian Purity: Vaishno Devi is a "Vaishnava" goddess. This means she does not accept animal sacrifices. She is strictly vegetarian. In the local hierarchy, vegetarian deities are often seen as purer and higher in status than those who accept meat. This purity makes her the "senior" or elder authority figure.
- Economic and Social Power: Since India's independence, the number of pilgrims visiting her has grown from 30,000 to millions every year. This massive following has made her the "preeminent" (most important) goddess in the region.

Locals often call her Sherawali or Seranwali. This means "She who rides the lion." This name connects her to the warrior goddess Mahalakshmi or Mahadevi. It emphasizes her power as a queen who protects her devotees.

== Rituals and "Sanskritization" ==
The worship of the Seven Sisters is currently undergoing a significant transformation, often described by sociologists as "Sanskritization" or "Vaishnavization." This is the process by which local folk deities are absorbed into the high Brahmanical tradition.

=== The Taming of the Shaktis ===
Historically, many of the Seven Sisters (like Chamunda, Chintpurni, and arguably early forms of Jwala Ji) were worshipped with Tantra and animal sacrifice. They were fierce, unpredictable, and lived in the wild. However, as the influence of Vaishno Devi (the vegetarian ideal) grew, the other sisters began to be "tamed."

Vegetarian Offerings: In many shrines, the Bali (sacrifice) has been replaced by the breaking of coconuts or the offering of Halwa-Puri (sweet pudding and fried bread). This mimics the vegetarian standard set by the Elder Sister.

Possession: In villages, people believe the "wind" (pavan) of the goddess can enter a person. During these times, a person might act like the goddess and answer questions for the villagers.

Male Guardians: A key indicator of this "taming" is the installation of male guardians at the goddess shrines. Langurvir (Hanuman) and Bhairava are almost always present.

- Hanuman: Represents the pure, celibate, vegetarian servant who guards the Goddess, reinforcing her status as a mother figure rather than a terrifying, independent sexual force.
- Bhairavnath: Represents the fierce energy that must be controlled. In the Vaishno Devi legend, Bhairavnath is the aggressor whom the Goddess kills, yet she grants him liberation, subordinating his power to hers.

== The Commercial "Nine Devi" Circuit ==
In the modern era, the folk belief has been packaged into commercial tourism. Travel agencies now promote "Nau Devi Yatra" (Nine Goddess Pilgrimage) packages. The extension of the railway line to Katra and the development of helicopter services to Vaishno Devi have firmly established the "Elder Sister" as the anchor of this circuit, drawing millions of tourists who might then visit the "younger sisters" in Himachal Pradesh as add-on destinations.

== See also ==
- Shaktism
- Vaishno Devi
- Matrikas
- Navaratri
