= Shreedar Pandit =

Shridhar Pandit

Personal life
- Known for: Discovering the cave shrine of Vaishno Devi
- Other names: Shreedhar Pandit; Shridar; Sridar

Religious life
- Religion: Hinduism
- Denomination: Shaktism; Vaishnavism

Religious career
- Period in office: c. 10th–11th century
- Residence: Hansali, near Katra

Shreedhar Pandit is also known as Shridar or Sridar. According to the oral traditions of the Jammu region, he was a poor farmer and a dedicated practitioner of Shaktism. Shridhar lived in the small village of Hansali, which was located just over a mile away from the present-day town of Katra. His primary historical and religious significance lies in his traditional role as the human conduit who first discovered the 98-foot-long holy cave-shrine of Sri Mata Vaishno Devi on the Trikuta Mountain.

== Historical Context ==
The historical context of Pandit Shridhar's life is deeply intertwined with the evolution of Shaktism in the Jammu region, as analyzed by historian Sindhu Kapoor. The Jammu province, recognized as a profound seat of Shakti worship, is geographically situated as a hilly region extending down to the plains of the Punjab. The era in which Pandit Shridhar lived is generally placed by scholars and oral traditions at approximately 700 to 900 years ago, corresponding roughly to the 10th or 11th century A.D. Prior to the prominent rise of the Vaishno Devi cult, the primitive inhabitants of the Jammu area primarily worshipped local geographical features, such as springs, rivers, and mountain peaks, as manifestations of the sacred. The Trikuta cave itself, with its three distinct rock outcroppings, was originally venerated by these local tribal populations. Shridhar's existence coincided with a period of significant cultural and religious synthesis between these non-Aryan tribal traditions and the incoming practices of Aryan immigrants. Scholars assert that Shridhar's forefathers were Aryan Brahmans who migrated from Agra to the plains of the Jammu Region around 800 years ago. This migration initiated a process wherein localized tribal deities were gradually absorbed into the broader Sanskritic Hindu pantheon, eventually coalescing into the unified figure of Mahadevi or the Great Goddess. The legend of Sridhar reflects this transitional era, explicitly noting that 700 to 800 years ago, very few Aryans or outsiders undertook the pilgrimage to the Trikuta Hills. Furthermore, Shridhar himself is identified as a Vaishnava Brahmin, which highlights the integration of Vaishnavite principles, such as strict vegetarianism and ritual purity, into the regional Shakti worship. It was within this dynamic and evolving religious landscape that Shridhar resided in the village of Hansali, diligently practicing his daily spiritual disciplines and keeping his profound faith in the Mother Goddess.

== The Legend of Vaishno Devi ==
The traditional legend of Pandit Shridhar begins with his deep yearning for a child, as he and his wife had no offspring. To seek the blessings of the Mother Goddess, Shridhar engaged in the daily religious practice of Kanya Pujan, which involves the ritual worship of young maidens. During one of these routine worship sessions, a mysterious young girl of extraordinary, celestial beauty appeared among the familiar local girls. After the ritual concluded and the other children departed, this brilliantly glowing maiden stayed behind. She commanded the bewildered Brahmin to invite all the residents of his village, as well as those from neighboring areas, to a grand Bhandara (community feast) at his home the very next day. Although Shridhar was an impoverished man who struggled to manage his daily sustenance, the spiritual authority of the girl caused him to forget his financial constraints, and he obediently set out to deliver the invitations.

While traveling to invite his neighbors, Shridhar encountered the famous ascetic Guru Gorakhnath and his 390 followers, extending the invitation to them as well. Among these followers was Bhairav Nath (or Bhairo), a practitioner of Tantric sects who was intrigued by the poor Brahmin's audacious undertaking. On the day of the feast, thousands of villagers and ascetics gathered at Shridhar's tiny hut, leaving the host anxious about how to seat and feed them. Suddenly, the mysterious maiden appeared and miraculously directed the multitude into the small hut, which mysteriously accommodated everyone with space to spare. The girl herself took charge of the service, magically providing exceptionally delicious food of each guest's choosing from a single vessel.

The peaceful feast was disrupted when Bhairon Nath demanded to be served meat and wine. The maiden politely but firmly refused, explaining that such items were strictly prohibited at the Bhandara of a Vaishnava Brahmin. Driven by ulterior motives and wishing to test her powers, Bhairon Nath attempted to physically grab the divine girl. To evade his grasp, she vanished from the site and fled toward the Trikuta Mountains.

Following the sudden disappearance of the girl, Pandit Shridhar was plunged into immense grief. Feeling as though he had lost his very soul, he abandoned food and water, locking himself inside a room to fervently pray for her return. After a period of deep despair, the Goddess appeared to Shridhar in a dream, revealing her true identity as Mata Vaishno Devi. In this vision, she showed him the exact location of her holy cave in the Trikuta Mountains and explicitly commanded him to search for it. She also blessed him with the boon of four sons, ending his childlessness. An alternate version of this legend suggests that Shridhar had vowed to fast until the Goddess personally fed him, prompting her to appear, feed him with her own hands, and instruct him to repair her dilapidated cave. Following the divine instructions from his vision, Shridhar embarked on a journey into the mountains, eventually discovering the Holy Cave and the three rock Pindis representing Maha Kali, Maha Lakshmi, and Maha Saraswati. He then dedicated the rest of his life to spreading the glory of the Goddess and conducting her daily worship at the newly discovered shrine.
