= Jhandewali Mata =

Hindu Mother Goddess

- Universal Protection, Destruction of Sins/Grief, and Salvation
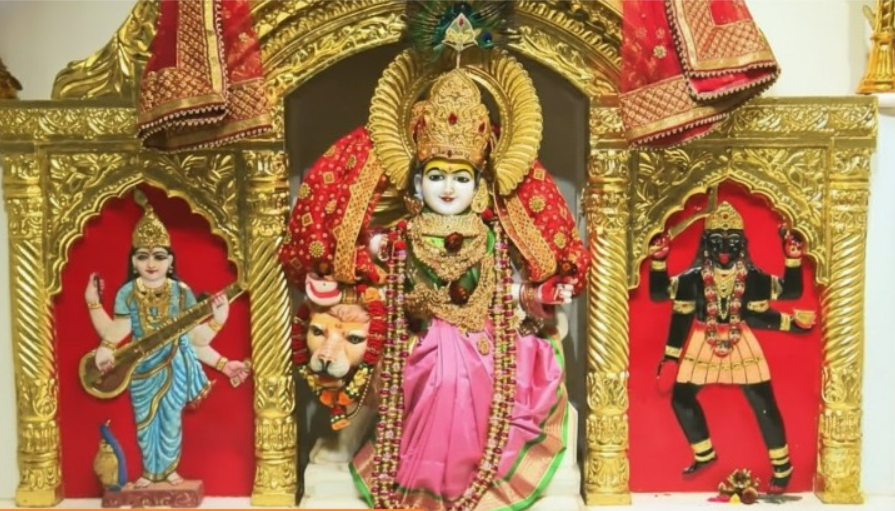
- Saraswati (left), Jhandewali Mata (middle), Kali (right)
- Other names: Jhandewali Mata, Gufawali Mata, Maharani Ji, Maateshwari, Jagadamba, Bhagvati, Sheron Wali Mata, Daati, Chandika, Vaishnavi
- Venerated in: Hinduism, Shaktism
- Affiliation: Mahadevi, Vaishno Devi, Saraswati, Lakshmi, Kali
- Abode: Jhandewalan Temple
- Mantra: Om Aim Hrim Klim Chamundaye Vichche
- Weapons: Trishul and Khadg
- Artefacts: Original idol (found with broken hands, now at ground level)
- Symbol: Flag (Jhanda), Jyoti (Flame)
- Mount: Lion
- Gender: Female
- Temples: Jhandewalan Temple (oldest place of worship, late 18th century)
- Festivals: Navratri, Durga Puja, Diwali

Jhandewali Mata (Hindi: झंडेवाली माता) (also known as Jhandewalan Mata), a form of Mahadevi. The name "Jhandewalan" or "Jhandewali" means "She of the flags" or "associated with flags", derived from the tradition of offering prayer flags (jhanda) at the temple. Jhandewalan Mata is revered as the most powerful divine feminine figure in Hinduism and is associated with Vaishno Devi. The temple's beliefs are rooted in local and regional traditions around Delhi, particularly tied to its flag-offering customs.

== Legends and stories ==
Devi Origin is linked to a local legend involving Badri Das, a cloth merchant from Chandni Chowk and a devotee of Mata Vaishno Devi. According to tradition, Badri Das had a dream in which the Goddess told him about the idol. Following this revelation, the original idol of the Goddess was excavated from the site. This self-manifested (Swayambhu) form is known as Gufawali (Goddess of the Cave) and remains enshrined in the lower level of the sanctum.

== Worship and beliefs ==
Jhandewali Devi is manifestation of Adi Shakti Mata Vaishno Devi and the Supreme Mother. In local devotional tradition, she is regarded as a dual force a compassionate mother who forgives sins and a powerful queen (Maharani) who governs time and fortune. Worshippers often address the deity by epithets describing her nature, such as Sachiyan Jotan Waali (She whose flames are true). Central to the temple's philosophy is the concept of "One form, many names", viewing Jhandewali Devi as the unified embodiment of other prominent goddesses, including Vaishno Devi, Naina Devi, Saraswati, and Bhadrakali. Devotional observances at the temple typically combine humble submission with specific petitions. Devotees approach the goddess to seek spiritual salvation and the forgiveness of faults, characterizing their relationship as that of a dependent child to a mother. Simultaneously, prayers are offered for worldly protection and specific blessings associated with the days of the week, seeking attributes such as intellect, peace, and bravery.

== Iconography ==
The main deity is a manifestation of Adi Shakti. The original damaged idol, worshipped at ground level with silver hands added to honour its form, is housed in the subterranean cave shrine. The upper-level idol resembles depictions of Vaishno Devi.

== Associated temples and shrines ==
The primary shrine is the Jhandewalan Temple in Karol Bagh, one of Delhi's oldest places of worship, dating to the late 18th century. It features subsidiary shrines to Shiva and Kali, and is managed by the Badri Bhagat Jhandewalan Mandir Society.

== Folk traditions ==
Devotees believe sincere visits bring happiness, prosperity, and wish fulfilment.
