= Bhairav (tantrik) =

Disciple of Gorakhnath

Bhairavnath
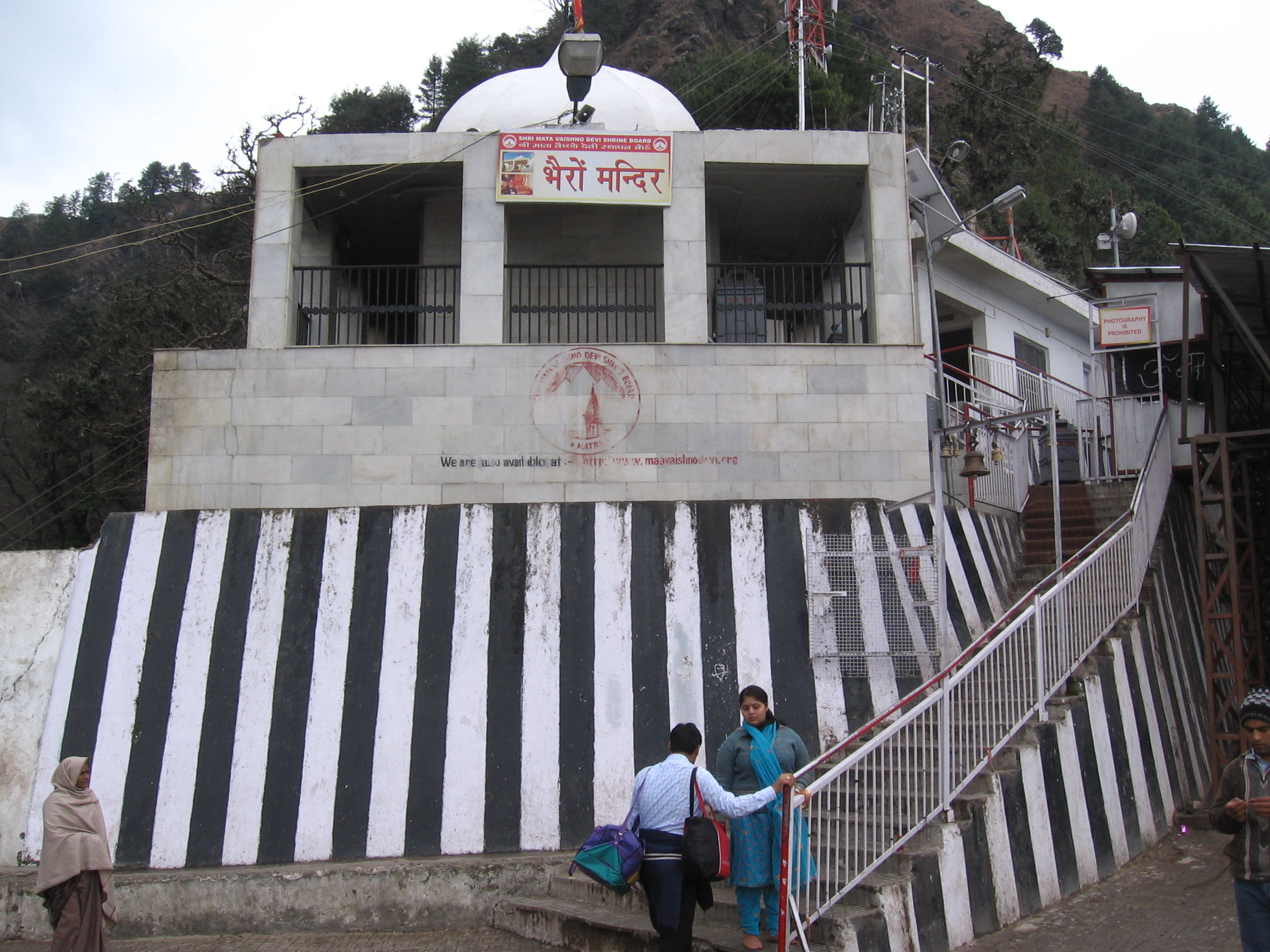
- Temple of Bhairav, near Vaishno Devi shrine
- Other names: Bhairav, Bhairon, Bhaironath, Bhairon Bali
- Venerated in: Hinduism
- Affiliation: Disciple of Gorakhnath
- Region: Trikuta Hills, Jammu and Kashmir
- Temples: Bhairon Ghati

Bhairavnath (also called Bhairav, Bhairon, or Bhaironath) is the central antagonist-turned-beneficiary in the most widely circulated version of the Mata Vaishno Devi legend. He was a powerful tantric disciple of Guru Gorakshanath.

== Legend ==
In the most widely cited and accepted legend, Bhairon is described as the most able disciple of the Tantrik Guru Gorakhnath. Another variation portrays him as Bhairon Bali, a devil king who ruled the territory between the Sutlej and Jehlum rivers during the Kali Yuga.

The conflict began during a grand feast arranged by Pandit Shridhar, a devout follower of the Vaishno Devi. During this feast, Bhairon demanded to be served meat and wine. The Goddess, appearing as a young maiden, refused his demand, explaining that such items could not be served in a vegetarian Brahmin's house. Struck by her extraordinary beauty, Bhairon lustfully tried to grab her hand, prompting her to flee towards the Trikuta Hills. According to an alternate legend, Bhairon was a devil king who proposed marriage to the Goddess. When she rejected him, he started a war and relentlessly chased her into the mountains. As the Goddess fled, she stopped at several places that are now important stops on the modern pilgrimage route. One of these stops is Ardhkuwari, where she hid and meditated for nine months in a narrow cave called Garbh-Joon.

When Bhairon Nath finally tracked her down, a mendicant warned him that the girl was actually Adishakti who had taken a vow of celibacy, but Bhairon ignored the warning. The Goddess blasted her way out of the cave with her trident and continued her ascent, leaving Hanuman Langoor to guard the entrance to her holy cave. Bhairon arrived at the cave, fought the Langoor, and routed him.

=== Death and the Boon ===
Seeing Bhairon's stubborn and evil intentions, the Goddess assumed the terrifying form of Mahakali (also referred to as Chandi or Chamunda) and beheaded Bhairon Nath with a single, mighty stroke. His severed head was flung high up the mountain to a place now known as Bhairon Ghati, while his headless torso fell at the entrance of the holy cave, where it remains today as a 14-foot-long petrified rock boulder. In his final moments, Bhairon realized his mistakes. Fearing that future generations would remember him only as a sinner, he deeply repented and begged the Goddess for forgiveness, pleading that future generations would despise him if she did not show mercy.

Touched by the sincerity of his last-minute repentance, the compassionate Goddess forgave him and granted him a remarkable boon. She declared that the pilgrimage of her devotees would forever remain incomplete unless they also visited the site where Bhairon's head fell to pay him their respects.

== Bhairon Temple (Bhairon Ghati) ==
Bhairon Temple

Religion
- Affiliation: Hinduism
- Deity: Bhairavnath

Location
- Location: 2.5 km from the main Bhawan
- State: Jammu and Kashmir
- Country: India

Architecture
- Elevation: 6,619 ft (2,017 m)

The Bhairon Temple was established at the exact spot where Bhairon Nath's severed head is believed to have fallen. According to the blessing granted by the Goddess Vaishno, visiting this temple is the final and mandatory step of the Great Pilgrimage. The journey to Mata Vaishno Devi is not considered complete without performing "Bhairo Darshan." During this official closing ritual, pilgrims offer flowers and money to seek his blessings before returning home.

=== Inside the Temple ===
Inside the shrine, the main object of worship is a round rock shaped like a human head, which is traditionally draped in black cloth. The temple also features a Havan Kund (a sacred fire pit). Devotees consider the ashes from this fire to be highly holy. Many believe that keeping or applying these ashes will protect them and their children from curses, untoward happenings, and mysterious ailments.

=== Location and Modern Access ===
The temple is located at an altitude of 6,619 feet, about 1.5 to 2.5 kilometers above the main Mata Vaishno Devi cave (Bhawan).

Historically, reaching the Bhairon Temple required a steep and treacherous climb. Because of this exhausting trek, many tired pilgrims would skip the visit, even though it was meant to be a mandatory part of the journey. To solve this problem, the Shri Mata Vaishno Devi Shrine Board installed a modern passenger ropeway (cable car) to connect the Bhawan to Bhairon Ghati. This ropeway system can carry 800 passengers per hour, making it possible for nearly 10,000 pilgrims to comfortably and safely visit the temple every day.

== Bibliography ==
- Kapoor, Sindhu (2021). Mata Vaishno Devi: Mythology, History and Heritage. Oberoi Book Service.
- Foster, Georgana; Stoddard, Robert (2010). "Vaishno Devi, the Most Famous Goddess Shrine in the Siwāliks".
