= Vajreshvari Devi =

Hindu goddess and one of the 51 Shakta pithas

Vajreshwari (Vajreśvarī)
- Thunderbolt/Diamond (Vajra)
- Member of Saat Behna (Seven Sisters goddesses)
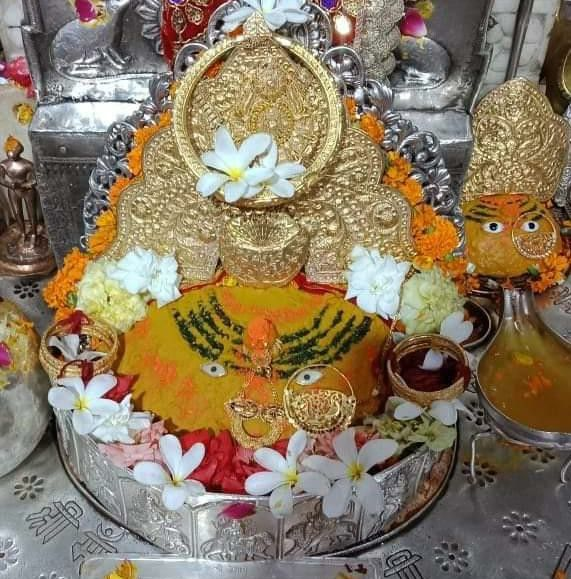
- Other names: Bajreshwari, Kangra Devi, Kangrawali
- Affiliation: Adi Shakti, Shakti
- Texts: Manthānabhairavatantra, Tantric texts
- Region: Kangra, Himachal Pradesh, India
- Temples: Vajreshwari Devi Temple, Kangra (Shakta pitha)

Equivalents
- Tantric: Kālī (Epithet)
- Regional/Warrior: Durgā (Warrior)
- Tantric: Nityā (Tantric Yoginī)

Vajreshvari (lang-sa|वज्रेश्वरी, Vajreśvarī), also known as Bajreshwari, Kangra Devi, or Kangrawali, is a fierce form of the Hindu goddess Shakti, primarily worshipped in the Kangra Valley, Himachal Pradesh. Her name derives from vajra (thunderbolt or diamond) and īśvarī (supreme female ruler), literally meaning "Goddess of the Thunderbolt" or "Diamond Goddess". The principal centre of her worship is the Vajreshwari Devi Temple in Kangra, regarded as one of the 51 Shakta pithas.

== Scriptural mentions ==
Vajreśvarī appears in several Tantric texts. In the Manthānabhairavatantra she is identified as one of the nine Nitya Yoginīs particularly associated with Kāma. She is also described as an epithet of Kali while being invoked as the warrior form of Durga in certain rituals. In the Kangra region she is understood as a fierce manifestation of Mahadevi.

== Legend ==
According to local tradition, the Vajreshwari temple in Kangra marks the spot where the left breast of the goddess Sati fell, making it one of the 51 Shakta pithas.

== Temple ==
Main Page - Vajreshwari Temple

The main shrine is the Vajreshwari Devi Temple in Kangra town. Historically it was second in importance only to the nearby Jwalamukhi Temple and was a major source of revenue for the Kangra rulers. The original structure was destroyed in the 1905 Kangra earthquake and rebuilt in the 1930s.

== Historical practices and academic views ==
Seventeenth-century European travel accounts and Mughal records describe the temple as a prominent centre of the Śakti cult where extreme acts of devotion, including self-mutilation and occasional ritual suicide, were performed as offerings of blood to ensure fertility. These blood-spilling practices were largely discontinued in the 18th century as they came into conflict with the emerging non-violent, Brahmanical representation of Hinduism promoted by urban elites.
