= Banganga River (Jammu and Kashmir) =

River in India

Banganga River Balganga
- Location within Jammu and Kashmir Location within India

Physical characteristics
- Source
  - coordinates: <32.9985771°N 74.9405975°E
- Mouth
  - coordinates: 32.9797895°N 74.865237°E

Banganga (also known as Bal Ganga) is a river and a major stopping point on the pilgrimage route to the Vaishno Devi shrine in Jammu and Kashmir. It is located approximately 1 km from the base camp town of Katra, at an altitude of approximately 2,800 feet.

== Mythology and Etymology ==
The name "Banganga" is derived from the words ban (arrow) and Ganga (the river Ganges). According to local tradition, while fleeing toward the Trikuta mountains, the goddess Vaishno Devi shot an arrow into the ground to provide water for her companion, Langoor. The river is also referred to as "Bal Ganga" (meaning "hair Ganges"), as legend states the goddess used the stream to wash her hair.

== Rituals ==
Pilgrims often perform a ritual bath in the river before continuing the trek. Two bathing ghats are located at the site, including a designated area for women. Other rituals performed at the site include:

- Mundan: Traditional head tonsure ceremonies.
- Khetri / Saankh Parvahna: The immersion of sacred crops grown during the Navratra festivals into the river.

== Infrastructure ==
Banganga is connected to Katra via a metalled road and is crossed by a wooden bridge. The area provides several services for pilgrims:

- Food Services: Free food services are a notable feature of Banganga. The late industrialist Gulshan Kumar established a well-known free public kitchen here, and the Shrine Board has also extended its own langar services to Shubhra Bhawan at Banganga. Small shops selling dry fruits, tea, and cold drinks are also present.
- Medical facilities: Dispensaries providing emergency medical supplies and oxygen are available at the site.
- Rest areas: Facilities with a capacity for approximately 2,000 pilgrims are available to accommodate travelers.

== Environmental impact ==
The high volume of pilgrims and the use of pack animals (ponies) for transport have resulted in sanitation and environmental challenges. Waste from both pilgrims and animals is often disposed of in the river. In response, authorities have implemented measures to increase the number of water points and sanitation blocks along the route.
