= Vaishnodevi Temple, Rourkela =

Temple located in Rourkela, Odisha, India

Coordinates: 33.0311°N 74.9490°E

Vaishnodevi Temple at Rourkela is a replica of the original Temple of Vaishnodevi of Jammu (Trikuta Hills) and is situated on the top of the Durgapur Hill facing towards Rourkela Steel Plant. Bhairabanath Temple is situated near Vaishodevi Temple on the hill.

In 2007, the Temple of Goddess Durga, located on the top of the hill, was opened for visitors. During Durga Puja, in the spring and autumn seasons, the Navaratri Festival is celebrated, hundreds of Hindu worshippers come here.
