= Jhandewalan Temple =

Hindu temple in Delhi, India

Shri Jhandewalan Temple
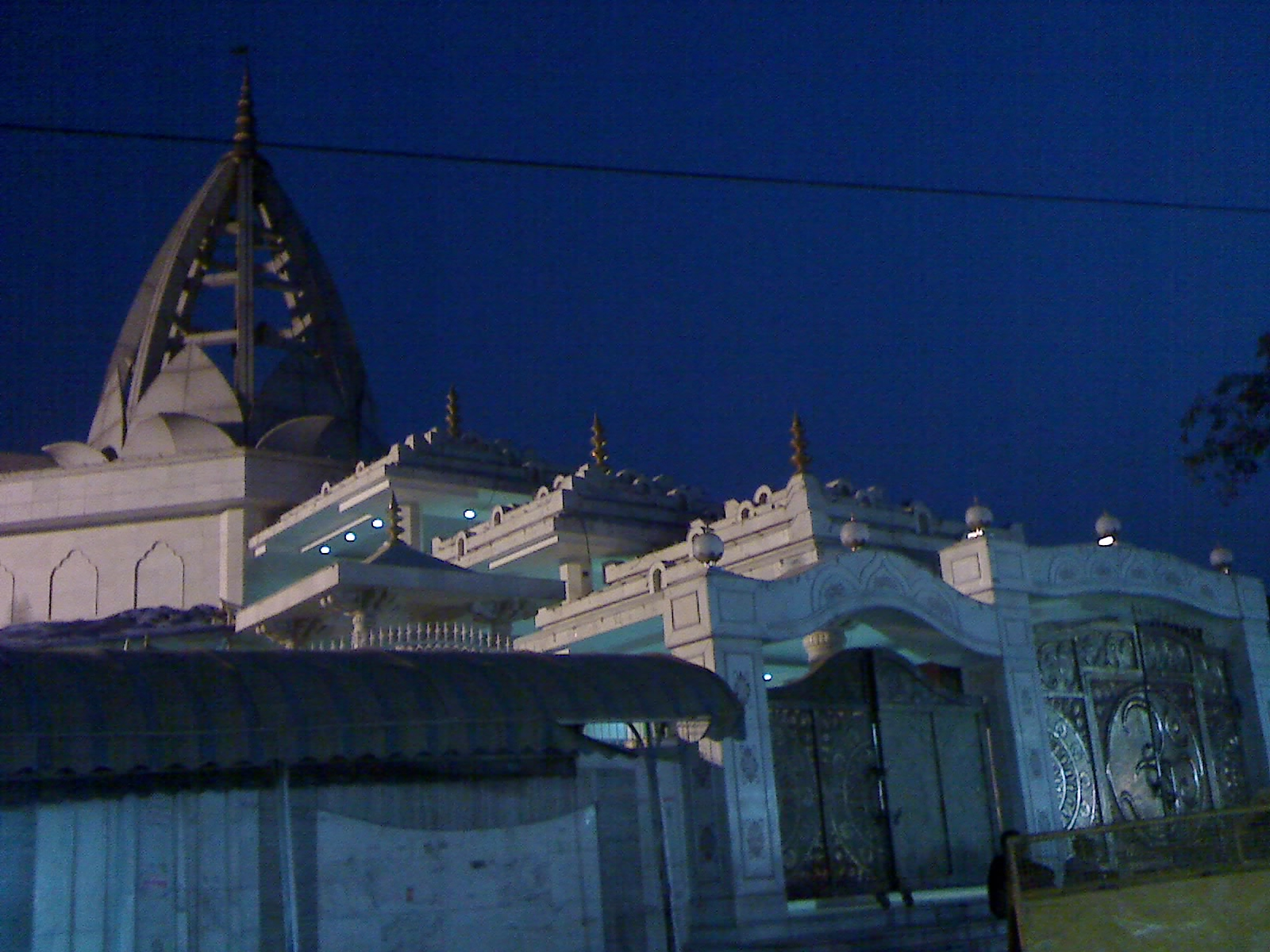

- Location in Delhi

Religion
- Affiliation: Hinduism
- District: North Delhi
- Deity: Jhandewali Mata
- Festivals: Navratri, Durga Ashtami, Diwali, Durga Puja

Location
- Location: Jhandewalan metro station North Delhi
- State: Delhi
- Country: India
- Coordinates: 28°38′57″N 77°12′15″E

Architecture
- Type: Hindu temple architecture

Website
- jhandewalamandir.org

The Jhandewalan Mandir, a Delhi Hindu temple dedicated to Vaishno Devi, was founded in the 19th century by Badri Bhagat, named for a large flag hoisted when a deity was discovered. Formerly in Ram Bagh, it hosted events like the Pavan Pariksha Mela, which ended after Partition. Now surrounded by urban development, it remains a major religious center, especially during Navratras.

== Location and surroundings ==
Historically, Jhandewalan lay in a populated, central stretch of the Delhi Ridge, an area where rocks and building stone were extensively quarried. Over time, the locality developed into a major commercial hub, including the relocation of a large wholesale bicycle market from the Jama Masjid and Esplanade Road areas, with the new market reportedly costing about ₹14 crore to construct.

The area also developed local infrastructure and educational institutions. It housed the Jhandewala Sanskrit Pathshala, a donation-funded school offering Shastri courses and free boarding for students, and a Municipal T.B. Clinic in Jhandewalan Extension. Nearby Idgah–Jhandewalan localities have historically included informal jhuggi–jhonpri (shack) settlements.

== History ==
=== Discovery of idol ===
Shri Badri Das, also known as Badri Bhagat, was a successful cloth merchant from Chandni Chowk and a devoted follower of Vaishno Devi. In the 1800s, the area was a quiet hill with fruit trees and a freshwater spring where he would go to meditate. It is said that he had repeated dreams about an ancient shrine buried near the spring. Following these dreams, he started digging near a small waterfall and found an old idol of Vaishno Devi deep inside a cave. Because the idol’s hands broke while digging, Badri Das left it in its original place and placed a new idol directly above it using traditional rituals. To mark the event, a large flag (jhanda) was raised on the hill so people could see the shrine from far away. Over time, the temple and the hill became known as the Jhandewalan Temple, meaning the "place of the goddess with the flag". Today, the main goddess worshipped in the upper temple is Jhandewali Mata, who is also known locally as Sheranwali.

=== Badri Bhagat Jhandewalan Temple Society ===
After the death of Bhagat Badri Das, his son Ramji Das and later his grandson Shyam Sundar took over the management of the temple. Under their leadership, the temple grounds were developed and improved. In 1944, Shyam Sundar established a legal organization called the Badri Bhagat Jhandewalan Temple Society to properly manage the temple and its daily programs.

The founding members of the society were:

- Rai Saheb Girdhari Lal (businessman and banker) – Chairman
- Pt. Chundamani Sharma (Superintendent at the Delhi Electric Supply and Traction Company) – Vice President
- Rai Saheb Shriram (lawyer) – Secretary
- Bhagat Shyam Sundar (textile businessman) – Manager
- Lala Kanwar Kishore (textile businessman) – Treasurer
- Rai Saheb Guru Prasad Kapoor (commission agent) – Member
- Lala Harnam Das Khanna (landlord) – Member
- Lala Banwari Lal Gupta (commission agent) – Member

=== Hindu Jat and Muslim riots of 1924 ===
During the British Raj, Muslims had built a slaughterhouse close to the temple. In May 1924, on the day of Bakri Eid, the Muslims of Pahari Dhiraj slaughtered a cow - which is revered by the Hindus as sacred - in the slaughterhouse close to the Jhandewala temple. This angered the Hindu Jats of Sadar Bazaar, which led to riots among the Jats and Muslims between 11 July and 18 July, resulting in loss of life and property. Muhammad Ali Jinnah repeatedly requested Mahatma Gandhi and Indian National Congress (INC) to stop the Jats, but Gandhi and INC were unable to control the situation. Riots were eventually stopped by the police.

=== 2025 Demolition Drive ===
On November 29, 2025, a significant demolition drive was carried out by the Municipal Corporation of Delhi (MCD) in the Jhandewalan, specifically affecting the ancient Baba Pir Ratan Nath temple-dargah complex located near the RSS headquarters. The action involved the removal of structures cited as illegal encroachments, including a langar hall and several residential units. The demolition led to widespread local protests, with residents and devotees alleging that the site held over 800 years of historical significance and that no prior legal notice was served.

== Architecture ==
The temple derives its name from its location on a hillock known as Jhandewala, situated near the crossroads of Deshbandhu Road and Panchkuian Road on the way to Karol Bagh. The neighborhood immediately surrounding the temple is also referred to as Motia Khan. Inside the temple compound, visitors can find a garden, several dharamshalas (rest houses), a Hanuman temple, and an old well renowned for its cold water. The main shrine is an octagonal Devi temple that rests on a stone platform reached by four steps. It houses a white marble idol of the goddess and features a dalān (pavilion) in the front with a parikrama (circumambulation path) surrounding the structure.

== Social service ==
The temple is known for its extensive charitable work, particularly through its langar (a communal kitchen providing food to the needy). During the 2020 COVID-19 lockdown, the temple executed one of Delhi's largest humanitarian efforts, serving over 1.85 million meals to nearly 35,000 people over a 50-day period. These efforts extended to the homeless in Karol Bagh and Rani Jhansi Road. In recognition of this service, the Delhi Police honored the temple's volunteers with a ceremonial bike salute and a drone-led flower petal tribute in May 2020.

== Religious celebrations ==
The daily worship at the temple follows a regulated schedule of five Aartis, with timings adjusting between summer and winter seasons. The day begins with the Mangal Aarti at 5:30 AM (Summer) or 6:00 AM (Winter), where dry fruits are offered as bhog. This is followed by the Shringar Aarti at 9:00 AM, during which devotees offer cheele, chane, milk, and coconut. At noon, the Bhog Aarti takes place, featuring a meal of rice, dal, and roti. Evening rituals commence with the Sayam Aarti at 8:00 PM (Summer) or 7:30 PM (Winter), where chane is offered. The day concludes with the Shayan Aarti at 10:00 PM (Summer) or 9:30 PM (Winter), with an offering of milk before the temple closes. The temple premises open at 5:00 AM in the summer and 5:30 AM in the winter. The shrine remains closed for a break from 1:00 PM to 4:00 PM, although this closure is suspended on Sundays, Tuesdays, and during Ashtami. The temple hosts specific weekly and monthly events. A Havan and Kirtan are performed daily in the morning. On Tuesday evenings, a special Kirtan is held. A Jagaran is performed on the Ashtami of every Shukla Paksha (waxing phase of the moon) starting at 10:00 PM.

=== Navratri Festival Management ===
During the Navratri festival, the temple experiences a massive influx of pilgrims. To manage the scale of the event the temple administration appoints a festival head who oversees a large-scale operation supported by over 2,000 volunteers, including a dedicated 300-member women's team. The volunteers are divided into specialized departments to handle the daily logistics of the festival. Crowd control and security are managed in coordination with local police, utilizing a central control room and CCTV surveillance. Other dedicated volunteer teams manage traffic, provide free parking, and run a lost-and-found service for separated families. Essential services for devotees are provided continuously, including free daily meals, drinking water distribution, shoe storage, and primary medical care.

Volunteers also handle the religious and environmental logistics of the festival. Teams manage the distribution of offerings, such as coconuts and fruit prasad. To handle the high volume of floral offerings, the temple operates an on-site recycling plant that converts discarded flower garlands into fertilizer, which is then distributed to local parks for free. The temple's publicity department also manages the live broadcasting of major events and aartis on digital platforms.

=== Festivals and pandemic response ===
The temple is a major center for Navratri celebrations in Delhi, featuring rituals such as Jyoti Kalash, Kanya Puja, and Devi Mahatmya. During the 2020 COVID-19 pandemic, the temple authorities implemented strict safety protocols, including twice-daily sanitization and the deployment of medical teams consisting of hundreds of volunteers to manage devotee flow. Despite a decrease in footfall due to government restrictions, traditional ceremonies like the Grand Aarti on Durga Ashtami continued to be performed by the priests under specialized health guidelines.

The temple hosts numerous festivals, with Navratri and Durga Puja featuring special pujas. During these festivals, the temple is adorned with lights and flowers, and kirtan, bhajans, and havans are held each morning. Photography is prohibited in the prayer hall.

== See also ==
- Chahamanas of Shakambhari
- Devi
- Shakti
