= Dewamai =

Village in Uttar Pradesh, India

Dewamai Deva Mai
- Village
- Location in Uttar Pradesh, India
- Coordinates: 27.23506°N 78.96782°E
- Country: India
- State: Uttar Pradesh
- District: Mainpuri
- Tehsil: Mainpuri

Area
  - Total: 4.146 km^{2} (1.601 sq mi)

Population (2011)
  - Total: 2,920
  - Density: 704/km^{2} (1,820/sq mi)
- Time zone: UTC+5:30 (IST)

Dewamai (Dewāmaī), also spelled Deva Mai or Dewa Mai, is a village in Mainpuri block of Mainpuri district, Uttar Pradesh, India. As of 2011, it had a population of 2,920, in 513 households.

== Demographics ==
As of 2011, Dewamai had a population of 2,920, in 513 households. This population was 53.5% male (1,561) and 46.5% female (1,359). The 0-6 age group numbered 448 (244 male and 204 female), or 15.3% of the total population. 1,252 residents were members of Scheduled Castes, or 42.9% of the total.

The 1981 census recorded Dewamai as having a population of 2,026 people, in 371 households.

The 1961 census recorded Dewamai as comprising 6 hamlets, with a total population of 1,443 people (769 male and 674 female), in 288 households and 237 physical houses. The area of the village was given as 1,036 acres.

== Infrastructure ==
As of 2011, Dewamai had 1 primary school; it did not have any healthcare facilities. Drinking water was provided by hand pump; there were no public toilets. The village had a post office but no public library; there was at least some access to electricity for all purposes. Streets were made of both kachcha and pakka materials.
