= Shri Mata Vaishno Devi Shrine Board =

Vaishno Devi shrine management board

- श्री माता वैष्णो देवी श्राइन बोर्ड
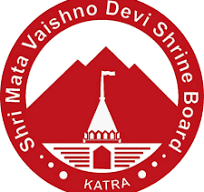
- SMVDSB Logo

Agency overview
- Formed: August 30, 1986; 39 years ago
- Type: Statutory autonomous board
- Jurisdiction: Government of Jammu and Kashmir
- Headquarters: Katra, Reasi district, Jammu and Kashmir, India
- Agency executive: Chairman; Chief Executive Officer
- Key document: Jammu and Kashmir Shri Mata Vaishno Devi Shrine Act, 1988
- Website: www.maavaishnodevi.org

The Shri Mata Vaishno Devi Shrine Board (SMVDSB), commonly referred to as the Shrine Board, is the statutory and autonomous body responsible for the management, administration, and governance of the Holy Shrine of Shri Mata Vaishno Devi Ji and its endowments. The Board's jurisdiction encompasses the lands and buildings attached to the Shrine, extending from the base camp in Katra up to the Holy Cave and the adjoining hillocks.

== History and formation ==
Before the Board's establishment, the Shrine's management and control rested with a private trust known as the Dharmarth Trust and a group of traditional local residents called Baridars. The Baridars collected offerings based on their turn (bari), but the pilgrimage was marred by a lack of facilities, mismanagement, and hardships for the devotees.

In August 1986, the Governor of Jammu and Kashmir, Jagmohan, initiated the takeover of the Shrine's management, citing a desire to end "material and moral corruption" and regenerate the cultural wasteland. This action was formalized by the Jammu and Kashmir State Legislature as the Jammu & Kashmir Shri Mata Vaishno Devi Shrine Act, 1988, which retroactively came into force on August 30, 1986. The Act extinguished all previous rights of the Baridars and vested the ownership of the "Shrine Fund" entirely in the newly formed Board.

== Governance and composition ==
The SMVDSB is a body corporate with perpetual succession and a common seal. The administration and governance of the Shrine and the Shrine Fund vest in a Board comprising a Chairman and no more than ten members. The Lieutenant Governor of Jammu and Kashmir (formerly the Governor) serves as the ex officio Chairman. If the Lieutenant Governor is not a Hindu, they may nominate an eminent Hindu to act as Chairman.

The Chairman nominates nine other members who have distinguished themselves in the service of Hindu religion or culture, administration, legal affairs, or financial matters, including two women who have excelled in social work or the advancement of women. A Chief Executive Officer (CEO), ranking no less than a District Magistrate, is appointed alongside other officers to efficiently discharge the Board's functions. All members, officers, and servants of the Board are deemed public servants.

== Infrastructure and yatra management ==
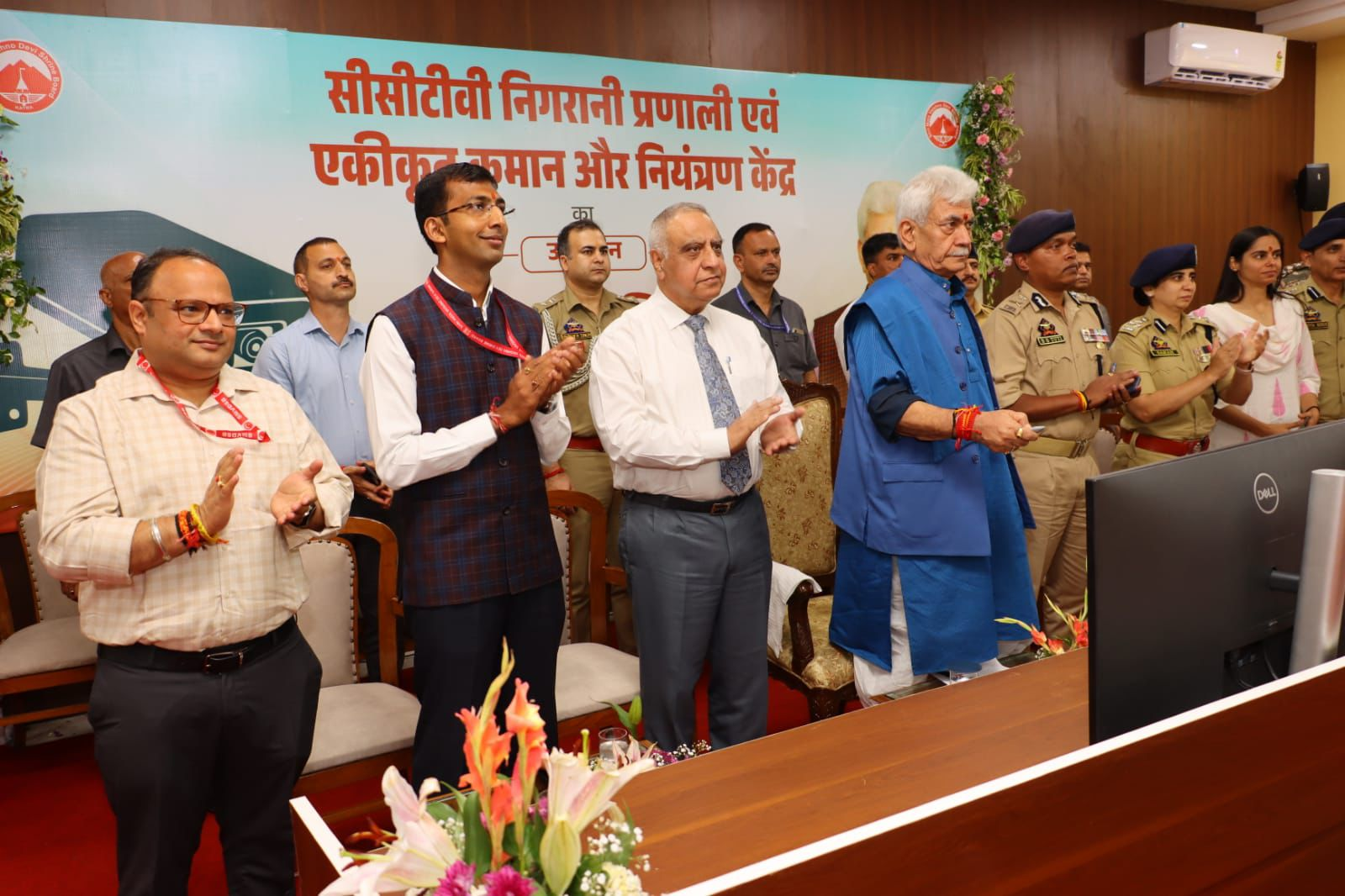
SMVDSB chairman Manoj Sinha at an inauguration

Since its inception, the SMVDSB has focused heavily on improving infrastructure to handle the massive influx of pilgrims. The annual footfall grew from roughly 13.95 lakh in 1986 to over 46 lakh by 2003, and peaked at nearly 10.5 million (104.95 lakh) in 2012. The Shrine has consistently maintained high footfall in recent years, recording over 9.5 million (95.22 lakh) visitors in 2023 and 9.48 million (94.83 lakh) in 2024, marking three consecutive years with over 9 million annual pilgrims.

- Track and cave access: To ease congestion at the main Shrine, which originally could only accommodate about 2,000 pilgrims per day, the Board constructed two new access tunnels to the holy cave, the first being built in 1989 by the National Projects Construction Corporation. The Board has also paved and illuminated the 14-kilometer pilgrimage route, maintaining an alternate track utilized for battery car services, emergency access, and material transport.
- Facilities and accommodation: The Board manages numerous accommodation facilities (such as Niharika Yatri Niwas, Vaishnavi Dham, and Saraswati Dham), resting places (Vishram Sthals), and free blanket stores supported by automatic dry-cleaning plants. It runs several Bhojanalayas on a non-profit, no-loss basis, providing hygienic vegetarian food prepared without onion and garlic. Over 100 toilet blocks and numerous drinking water coolers have been installed along the route.
- Sanitation and environment: The Board deploys a dedicated sanitation workforce of over 1,000 personnel. To promote environmental sustainability along the tracks, it has installed 'flush-me-not' waterless urinals to reduce water consumption and reverse vending machines for the scientific disposal and recycling of PET bottles.
- Ropeways and Sky Walk: A 375-meter passenger ropeway operates between Bhawan and the Bhairon Ji Temple, carrying up to 800 pilgrims per hour. To facilitate logistics, a separate material ropeway runs from Siar Dabri to Bhawan with a 5-ton per hour capacity. In October 2023, a 250-meter-long Sky Walk (Yatri Queue Management System) was inaugurated at Bhawan, elevated 20 feet above the track, to separate pilgrim flow and improve crowd management.
- Helicopter services: In addition to the existing helicopter route between Katra and Sanjichhat, the Board launched a direct helicopter service from Jammu to the shrine (landing at the newer Panchi helipad) in June 2024. Designed to assist pilgrims with time constraints, the service offers "Same Day Return" and "Next Day Return" packages, priced at ₹35,000 and ₹60,000 respectively, which bundle flights with priority darshan, battery car transport, and meals.
- Free Langar (Community Kitchens): The Board operates free Langar Sewas for pilgrims at Tarakote Marg, Sanjichhat, and the Bhairon Ji Temple complex.
- Medical, security, and technology: The Board provides round-the-clock medical facilities, including an Intensive Care Unit (ICU) at Bhawan, a 24-bedded hospital at Sanjichhat, and medical centers at Adkuwari and Banganga. For safety and crowd management, a computerized Yatra Registration Counter (YRC) issues mandatory Yatra slips to pilgrims, which automatically insures them against accidental casualties. The Board has also introduced RFID yatra access cards for real-time tracking, supported by over 700 CCTV cameras across the route. In December 2025, to further prevent overcrowding, the Board updated its crowd management protocols, mandating that pilgrims must commence their journey within 12 hours of receiving the RFID card and complete their round trip to the Katra base camp within 24 hours.

To further develop Katra and the surrounding region, the Board has approved several upcoming cultural and infrastructural projects. These include the establishment of an international "Shakti" museum, a sound-and-light show detailing the region's spiritual legacy, and an official documentary on the Shrine. Additionally, the Board has formed a dedicated committee to evaluate strategies for expanding pilgrimage capacity and further enhancing crowd management. To accommodate increasing footfall, the Board is also expediting several capacity-building infrastructure projects scheduled for completion by 2025, including the New Vaishnavi Bhawan with family rooms, an all-weather queue complex at Darshani Deodi and Banganga, and a dedicated exit track for seamless crowd movement.

== Incidents and controversies ==
In August 2025, a severe landslide near Adhkuwari, triggered by heavy rainfall, resulted in the deaths of 35 pilgrims and injured 20 others, leading to a temporary suspension of the yatra. In the immediate aftermath, the Shrine Board took responsibility for repatriating the bodies of the deceased to their native places and provided medical treatment to the injured at the Board-run Shri Mata Vaishno Devi Narayana Superspeciality Hospital. During the suspension, the Board cancelled all bookings and issued full refunds to devotees. Following the incident, the Board faced criticism for allegedly continuing the pilgrimage despite severe weather alerts. The SMVDSB formally refuted these allegations, stating that operations were conducted strictly in accordance with official weather forecasts and advisories. However, in October 2025, a local court in Katra directed the police to submit an Action Taken Report (ATR) regarding a complaint seeking the registration of a First Information Report (FIR) against the Board's Chief Executive Officer and other officials. The petitioner alleged criminal negligence, claiming the administration ignored "Red Alert" weather warnings issued prior to the incident.

In January 2026, the National Medical Commission (NMC) withdrew its approval for the MBBS course at the Board-run Shri Mata Vaishno Devi Institute of Medical Excellence (SMVDIME). The NMC's Medical Assessment and Rating Board cited gross deficiencies in infrastructure, patient clinical load, and a 39% shortage of teaching faculty. The withdrawal coincided with protests by local residents and Hindu organizations regarding the demographic composition of the maiden batch, wherein 46 of the 50 admitted students were Muslim. Protesters demanded admission reservations for Hindu candidates, arguing the ₹600 crore institute was built using Shrine donations. Following the revocation, the admitted students were relocated to other government medical colleges in the union territory.

== Philanthropy and social initiatives ==
To further its social responsibilities, the Board constituted the Shri Mata Vaishno Devi Charitable Society under the Societies Registration Act, 1860. This society oversees several major philanthropic projects:

- Healthcare: The Board established the Shri Mata Vaishno Devi Narayana Super Specialty Hospital (SMVDNSH) at Kakryal, a 300+ bed hospital built at a cost of over ₹300 crores, which provides medical services and financial support for the poor, pilgrims, and local residents. It also established the Shri Mata Vaishno Devi College of Nursing and the Shri Mata Vaishno Devi Institute of Medical Excellence (SMVDIME).
- Education: The Board funded the establishment of Shri Mata Vaishno Devi University (SMVDU) to impart technical and higher education in the region. In 2010, the Shri Mata Vaishno Devi Gurukul was set up in Katra to impart Vedic and Sanskrit knowledge alongside modern subjects, providing free education and boarding to students. The Board also approved the establishment of a coaching center to provide free NEET preparation courses for local youths. Additionally, under its Social Support Initiative, the SMVDSB funds the repair of local educational infrastructure; by December 2025, it had renovated ten government schools in Reasi and Udhampur districts that had been severely damaged by regional flash floods.
- Sports: A multipurpose Sports Complex, built at a cost of more than ₹10 crore, was inaugurated in Katra in 2016 to stimulate nationally recognized and Olympic sports. The complex has produced internationally successful para-athletes, including para-archers Rakesh Kumar and Sheetal Devi, who won multiple medals at the 2023 Asian Para Games and secured quota places for the 2024 Paris Paralympics.
- Local empowerment and rehabilitation: To boost the regional economy, the Board has implemented a policy to prioritize the procurement of Shrine offerings and supplies from local self-help groups (SHGs), women, and young entrepreneurs. It has also formulated a phased rehabilitation plan for track service providers, such as pony operators, in compliance with National Green Tribunal directives.
- Culture and animal welfare: In 2011, the Board established the SMVD Spiritual Growth Centre to promote religious tourism, featuring an auditorium, exhibition hall, and meditation center. The Board also collaborates with the Society for Prevention of Cruelty to Animals (SPCA) to ensure the welfare of ponies and equines operating on the tracks, including routine disease control measures.

== Economics and commemorations ==
Offerings and donations made by pilgrims are the mainstay of the Shrine Board's income, which is utilized for infrastructural creation and general upkeep. While the Board largely self-funds its operations, it has occasionally collaborated with the State and Central Governments on specific public utility projects. For example, the Board and the State Government equally co-funded a ₹6.83 crore water supply project, and the Ministry of New and Renewable Energy has provided targeted financial assistance for facilities under the Jawaharlal Nehru National Solar Mission. In the Financial Year 2023-24, the Board reported a total income of ₹683.04 crore, with the majority coming from offerings and donations (₹255.39 crore), alongside a total expenditure of ₹494.23 crore.

In March 2026, the Shrine Board renewed its Memorandum of Understanding (MoU) with J&K Bank, reinforcing the bank as its preferred partner for institutional banking and deposits. The agreement provides customized financial solutions for the Board, alongside enhanced welfare benefits for its employees, including specialized salary accounts, concessional loans, and group personal accidental insurance cover.

To mark the silver jubilee (25 years) of the Shri Mata Vaishno Devi Shrine Board's establishment, the Reserve Bank of India issued commemorative ₹5 coins in 2013. Prime Minister Manmohan Singh released these coins, praising the Board's developmental works and its support for weaker sections of society in the surrounding villages. The issuance of these coins sparked a legal debate when public interest litigations (PILs) were filed in the Delhi High Court demanding their withdrawal. The petitioners argued that embossing religious imagery on national currency violated the secular nature of the Indian state. However, in January 2018, the court dismissed the petitions, ruling that the government had the statutory authority to issue commemorative coins under the Coinage Act, 2011, and that commemorating the Board's administrative milestone did not dent the secular fabric of the nation.

== Awards and recognitions ==
In 2017, the SMVDSB received the 'Special Swachh Iconic Place' award under the Government of India's Swachhta Hi Seva campaign. The following year, it was declared the "cleanest religious place" at the Safaigiri Summit and Awards 2018 in recognition of its sanitation initiatives.

The Board has also been consistently recognized by the Ministry of Jal Shakti for its water conservation and management efforts. It won the first prize at the 3rd National Water Awards in 2022 under the 'Institution/Resident Welfare Association/Religious Organisation' category. In 2023, it secured the first position at the 4th National Water Awards in the 'Best Institution for Campus Usage' category, marking its third consecutive win at the awards.

Also in 2023, the Board was conferred the National e-Governance Gold Award by the Department of Administrative Reforms and Public Grievances for its technology-driven pilgrim services.
