= Kol Khandoli =

Ancient Hindu temple in Nagrota, Jammu

Coordinates: 32.7968°N 74.9149°E

Kol Kandoli Temple (also spelled Kol Kandholi) is an ancient Hindu temple located in Nagrota, Jammu, approximately 13–14 km from Jammu city. It holds a unique position as the Pratham Darshan (first spiritual glimpse) for pilgrims route to the Shri Mata Vaishno Devi Ji shrine. Tradition holds that devotees should seek blessings here before proceeding to the Holy Cave on Trikuta Mountain.

== Etymology and legend ==
The name "Kol Kandoli" derives from local Dogri dialect and legend. Kol refers to a bowl or utensil, while Kandoli (or Kandolan) means "shaking" or "agitating".

According to tradition, the young Vaishno Devi (Mata in her five-year-old form) lived in Nagrota for twelve years performing tapasya. One day, while playing with local children who became thirsty, she shook a silver bowl (kol) over a dry patch of ground, causing fresh water to spring forth. Because she shook (kandholana) the bowl to produce the water, the site became known as Kol Kandoli.

== Historical and spiritual significance ==
Historically, before modern roads and transport, Kol Kandoli served as a major halt for pilgrims. Groups would rest here, often overnight, and organize bhandaras (community feasts) before commencing the trek to Trikuta.

The journey from Kol Kandoli (base) to Vaishno Devi Bhawan (summit) is symbolically viewed as the ascent of Kundalini energy through the human body, from muladhara to sahasrara.

The temple complex is deeply rooted in Kashmiri Shaivism traditions, evident in its lotus motifs (eight- and sixty-four-petalled), the adjacent Ghandeshwari Mahadev temple, and the offering of kheer as prasadam linking it to the famous Kheer Bhawani shrine.

== Architecture and features ==
The present structure has undergone renovations, with contributions from the Archaeological Survey of India for preservation. The ancient temple wall features lotus designs reflecting its tantric associations.

Within the compound is a courtyard with swings tied to a peepul tree, where pilgrims perform ritual swinging as part of worship. The complex also houses idols of the ten Mahavidyas. Adjacent to the main shrine stands the Ghandeshwari Mahadev Shiva temple. Opposite it is a sacred well, traditionally believed to possess healing properties and linked to the legend of the divine child producing water.

== Patronage and historical context ==
Many temples along the Vaishno Devi route, including those in the Jammu region, were built or expanded under the patronage of the Dogra rulers during the 18th and 19th centuries. While specific records of Dogra involvement at Kol Kandoli await further research, the broader pattern of royal support for pilgrimage infrastructure in the area is well documented.
