= Katra, Jammu and Kashmir =

Katra Vaishno Devi
- Temple City
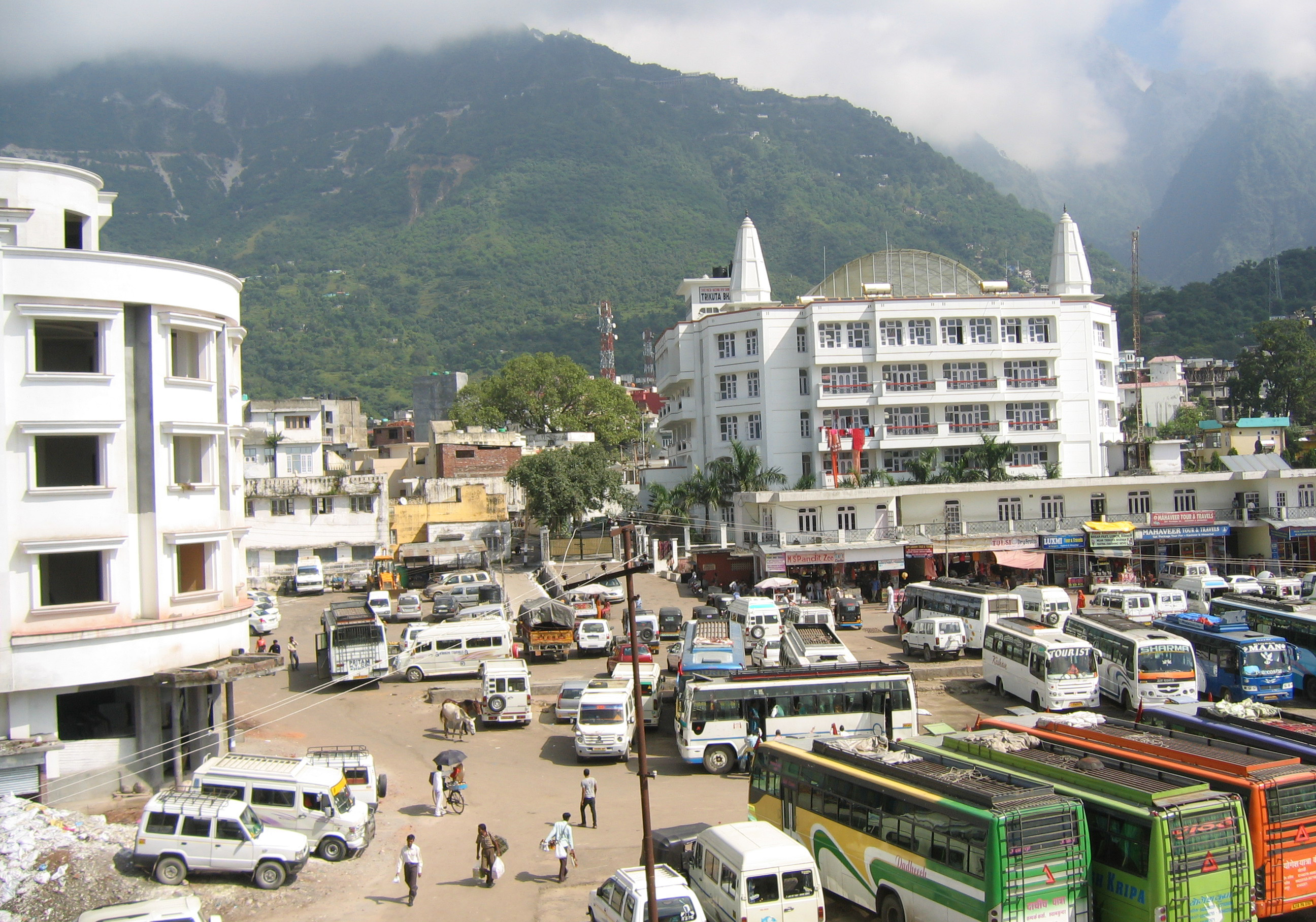

- Location in Jammu and Kashmir, India Katra (India)
- Coordinates: 32°59′22″N 74°56′0″E
- Country: India
- Union Territory: Jammu & Kashmir
- District: Reasi
- Elevation: 875 m (2,871 ft)

Population (2011)
  - Total: 9,008

Language
  - Official: Dogri, Hindi
  - Native: Dogri
- Time zone: UTC+5:30 (IST)
- Postal code: 182301
- Vehicle registration: JK
- Literacy: 75%

Katra or Vaishno Devi is a city and Tehsil in the Reasi district of the Indian union territory of Jammu and Kashmir. It is situated at the foot of the Trikuta Mountains, where the shrine of Vaishno Devi is located. Katra is located 24 km (15 mi) from the town of Reasi, 42 km (26 mi) from the city of Jammu and around 685 km (426 mi) north of the national capital New Delhi and is the base for pilgrims visiting the Mata Vaishno Devi Temple.

== Geography ==
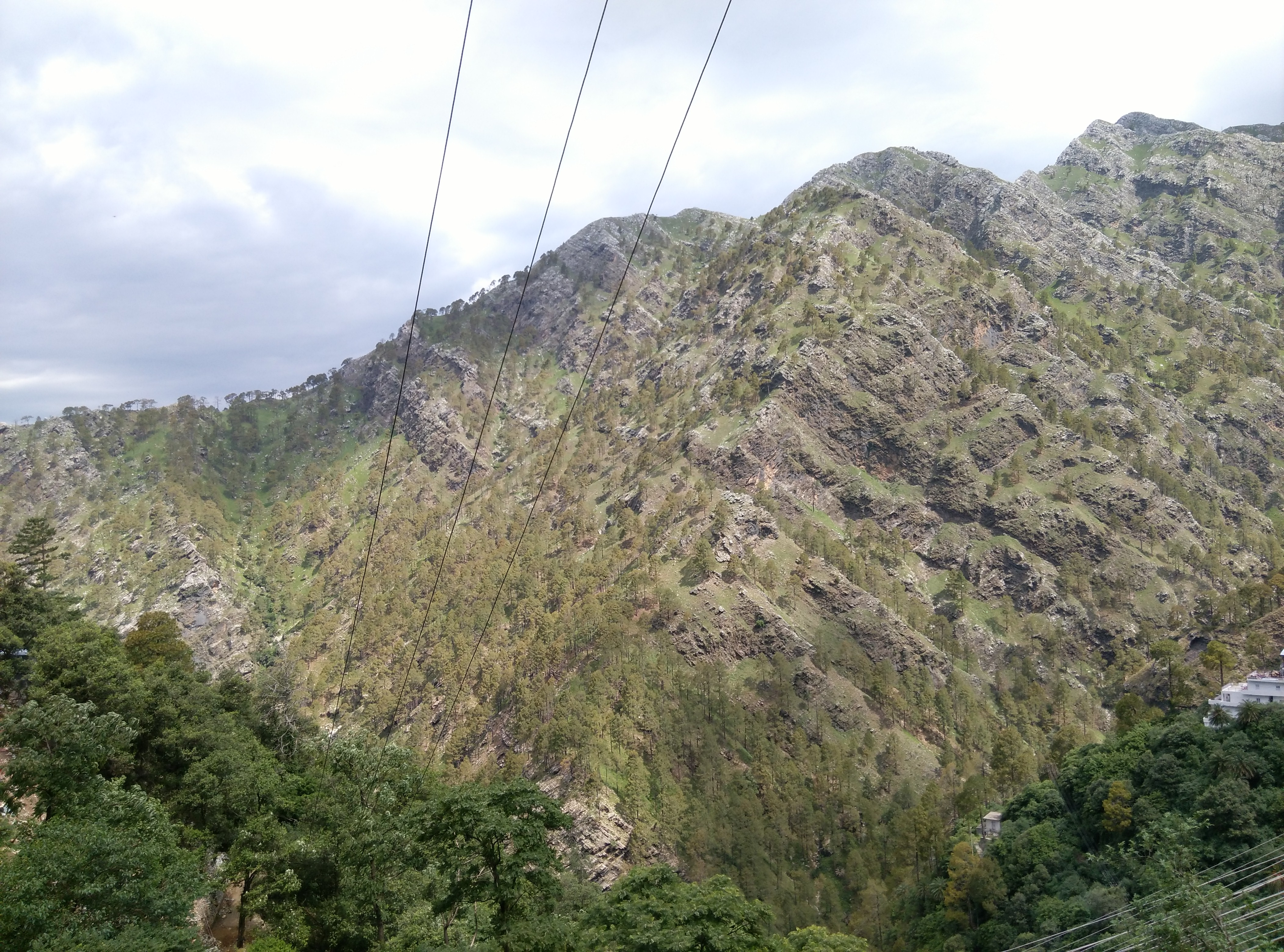
The Trikuta Mountains in Katra, Jammu and Kashmir, India, also famous for the Vaishno-Devi temple

Katra is located at 32.98°N 74.95°E. It has an average elevation of 875 metres (2,474 feet). The Banganga River passes through the village.

There have also been reports of possible oil reserves in the area

== Climate ==
Climate data for Katra (1991–2020, extremes 1980–2020)
Month	Jan	Feb	Mar	Apr	May	Jun	Jul	Aug	Sep	Oct	Nov	Dec	Year
Record high °C (°F)	25.8 (78.4)	28.9 (84.0)	33.1 (91.6)	39.3 (102.7)	43.7 (110.7)	42.6 (108.7)	40.4 (104.7)	36.3 (97.3)	33.4 (92.1)	33.3 (91.9)	29.7 (85.5)	27.6 (81.7)	43.7 (110.7)
Mean daily maximum °C (°F)	16.2 (61.2)	19.1 (66.4)	23.1 (73.6)	28.8 (83.8)	33.7 (92.7)	35.1 (95.2)	31.0 (87.8)	29.7 (85.5)	29.7 (85.5)	27.8 (82.0)	22.6 (72.7)	18.5 (65.3)	26.6 (79.9)
Mean daily minimum °C (°F)	6.8 (44.2)	9.2 (48.6)	12.6 (54.7)	17.1 (62.8)	21.3 (70.3)	23.5 (74.3)	23.2 (73.8)	22.7 (72.9)	20.8 (69.4)	16.3 (61.3)	11.7 (53.1)	8.1 (46.6)	16.4 (61.5)
Record low °C (°F)	0.3 (32.5)	−1.0 (30.2)	3.0 (37.4)	5.5 (41.9)	10.0 (50.0)	14.2 (57.6)	16.2 (61.2)	18.3 (64.9)	15.5 (59.9)	9.0 (48.2)	4.6 (40.3)	1.1 (34.0)	−1.0 (30.2)
Average rainfall mm (inches)	101.9 (4.01)	122.3 (4.81)	92.4 (3.64)	74.8 (2.94)	36.6 (1.44)	134.0 (5.28)	514.3 (20.25)	666.0 (26.22)	278.7 (10.97)	35.6 (1.40)	33.5 (1.32)	61.0 (2.40)	2,151.1 (84.69)
Average rainy days	4.6	6.1	5.3	5.6	3.1	6.9	17.0	17.1	7.7	2.2	2.2	2.1	79.9
Average relative humidity (%) (at 17:30 IST)	68	64	54	43	35	43	75	81	76	64	64	68	69
Source: India Meteorological Department

== Demographics ==
Religion in Katra (2011)
1. Hinduism (93.0%)
2. Islam (3.80%)
3. Sikhism (1.61%)
4. Christianity (1.48%)
5. Buddhism (0.03%)

As of 2011 Indian Census, Katra had a total population of 9,008, of which 5,106 were males and 3,902 were females. The population within the age group of 0 to 6 years was 1,012. The total number of literates in Katra was 6,841, which constituted 75.9% of the population with male literacy of 79.4% and female literacy of 71.4%. The effective literacy rate of the 7+ population of Katra was 85.6%, of which the male literacy rate was 89.2% and the female literacy rate was 80.8%. The Scheduled Castes and Scheduled Tribes population was 1,925 and 9 respectively. Katra had 1594 households in 2011.

=== Languages ===
As per the 2011 census, the majority, 78.2% of the population spoke Dogri, followed by 10.6% Hindi, 2.5% Punjabi, 2.2% Assamese, and 1.4% Kashmiri speakers.

== Tourism ==
Katra is the base camp for pilgrims visiting Vaishno Devi Temple. It has hotels, guest houses, restaurants, and dhabas. Free accommodation is also provided by some registered trusts in the form of sarais for the poor. The number of pilgrims who visit the shrine every year has increased from 1.4 million in 1986 to 8.2 million in 2009.

To reach Vaishno Devi Temple, pilgrims register at Katra before starting the trek, and this gives them accident insurance up to 100,000 INR while on the trek of 14 km. There is another trek of 2.5 km from Vaishno Devi temple to Baba Bhaironnath. Electric vehicles and helicopter services are available for pilgrims. A ropeway system has been inaugurated from the Vaishno Devi Bhawan to the Bhairon Baba Mandir, reducing the journey to time to three minutes. The ropeway can carry 800 people every hour.

Deva Mai Temple is also near Katra.

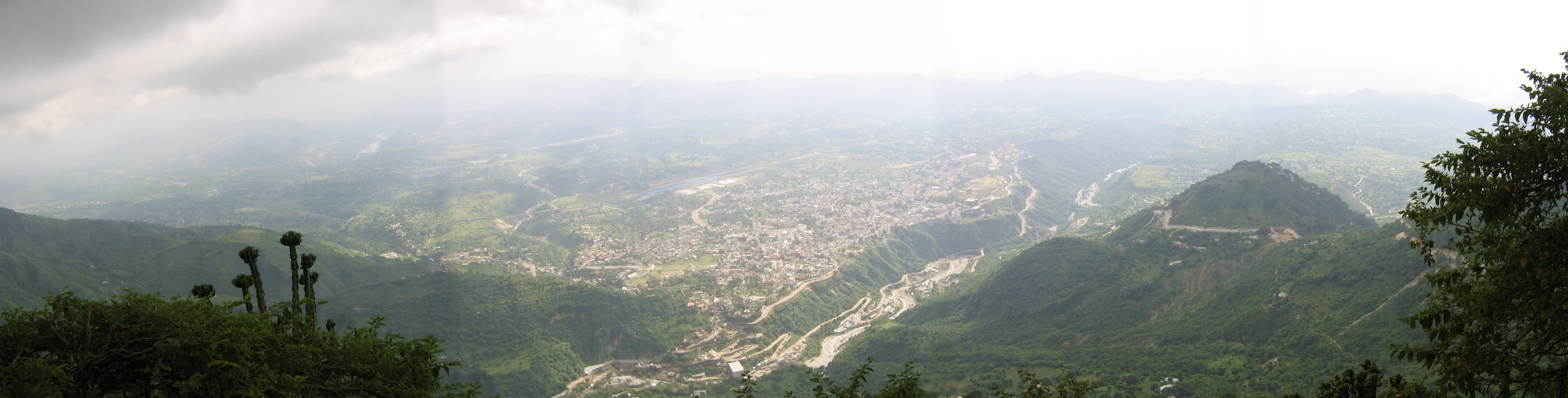
Panoramic view of Katra, seen from Vaishno Devi Temple

== Transport ==
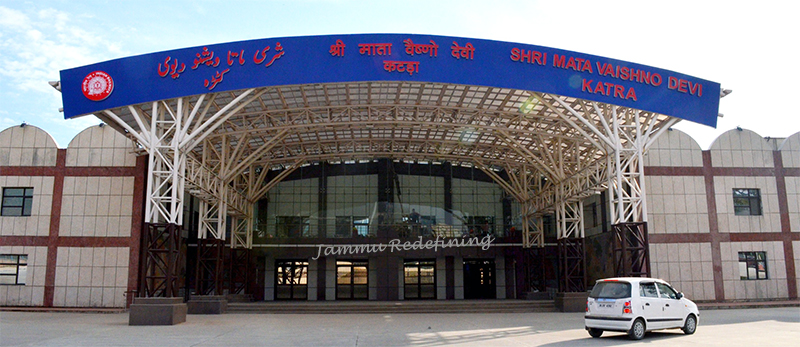
Katra Railway Station, Vaishno Devi.

=== Road ===
Katra is well-connected by roads with other places in Jammu and Kashmir and India. The NH 144 passes through Katra. Presently, it takes around 12 hours to travel from New Delhi to Katra. The planned Delhi–Amritsar–Katra Expressway will shorten the duration to 7 hours.

=== Rail ===
The Jammu–Baramulla line connects the Katra Railway Station of Northern Railways to the rest of the Indian railways' network. It was inaugurated by Indian Prime Minister Narendra Modi on 4 July 2014.

=== Air ===
The nearest airport to Katra is Jammu Airport located at a distance of 50 km (31 mi). There are numerous helipads in and around Katra which have service to the Vaishno Devi Temple.

=== University ===
Katra is the land of India's renowned University Shri Mata Vaishno Devi University, which is Public University and this University is on the name Maa Vaishno Devi. It is a popular University which run different types of courses like Engineering in various disciplines, courses in subjects like Economics, Biotechnology etc.
