= Trikuta =

Mountain mentioned in Hindu mythology

- Trikuta Hills, Vaishno Devi Hills, Tarkota, Traikakud, Trikata, and Trikta Devi
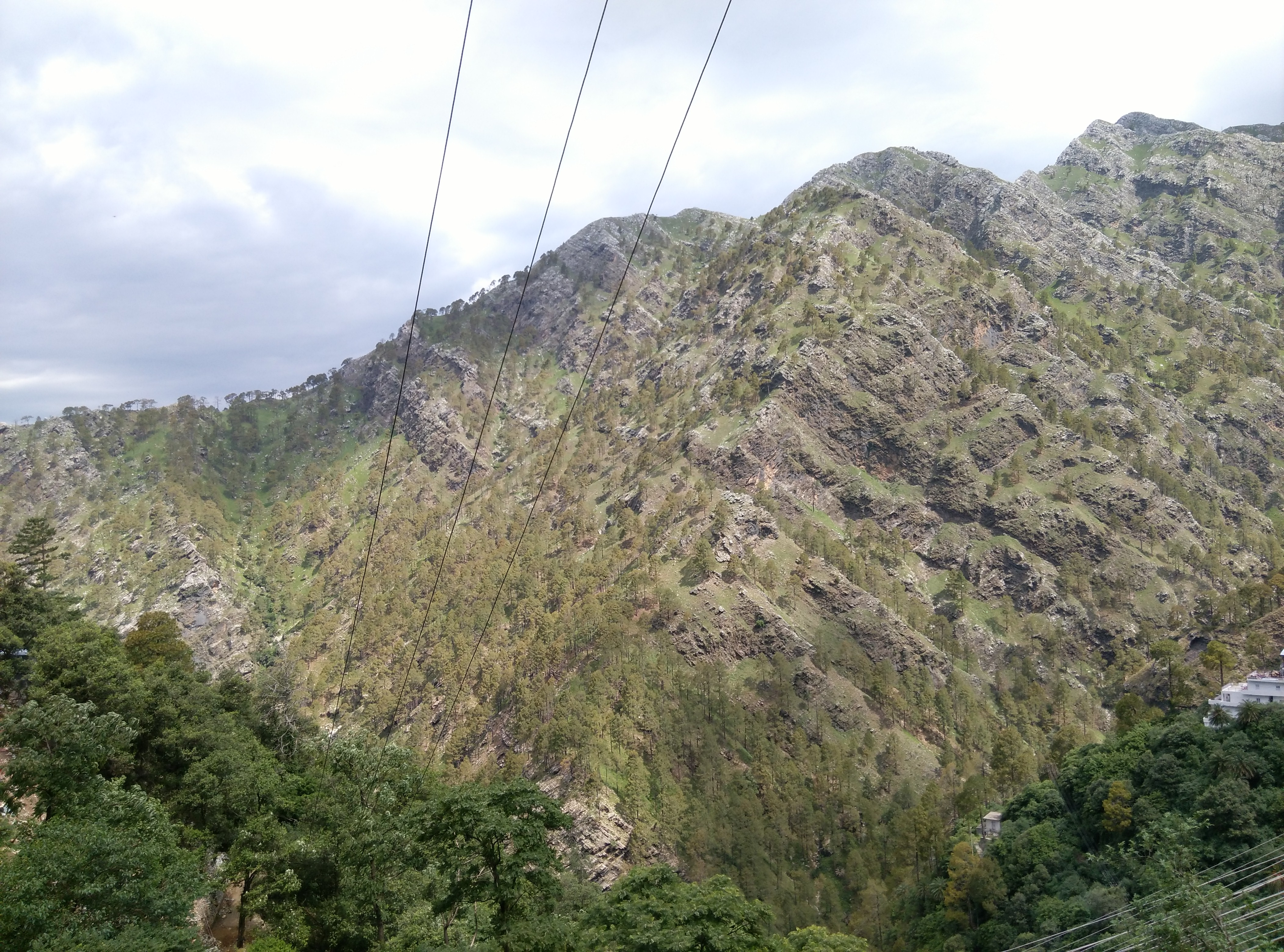

Highest point
- Elevation: 4,500 m (14,800 ft)

Naming
- English translation: Three peaked
- Language of name: Sanskrit

Geography
- Location: Reasi district, Jammu and Kashmir, India
- Country: India
- State(s): Jammu and Kashmir
- Parent range: Shivalik range, Himalayas

Geology
- Mountain type(s): Mountainous tract with deep gorges and steep ridges

Climbing
- Easiest route: 13 km (9-mile) footpath from Katra

The Trikuta Mountains (also called the Trikuta Hills or Vaishno Devi Hills) are a mountain range with three peaks in the Reasi district of Jammu and Kashmir, India. These mountains are part of the Shivalik range in the Himalayas. They are the site of the cave shrine of the Hindu goddess Vaishno Devi. Millions of Hindu pilgrims visit the shrine every year.

== Geography and climate ==
The mountains are located about 48 kilometers away from the city of Jammu. The land is very rough and steep, with deep valleys and high ridges. The mountains rise quickly from the Katra valley, which is 750 meters above sea level and can reach up to 4,500 meters high. Many important streams, like the Banganga and the River Jhajjar, start in these hills and flow into the Chenab River. The average temperature in the area is around 14°C, and it gets about 1,360 mm of rain each year. The highest parts of the mountains get snow in the winter. The foothills of Trikuta Mountain serve as the foundation for major local settlements. The modern pilgrimage base camp, the town of Katra, is situated adjacent to its foothills. Additionally, the historical city of Jammu lies at the foothills of Trikuta, right alongside the river Tawi.

== Geology ==
Geological studies show that the Trikuta Hills are primarily made of limestone and formed during the Precambrian era.

== Plants and animals ==
The mountains go from low valleys to high peaks, many different types of plants and animals live there. At the bottom, there are warm forests with pine and oak trees. Higher up, the forests change to cooler types, and above 3,000 meters, there are open grassy meadows. Areas like the Devi Pindiyan Valley are safe homes for rare plants and mushrooms.

The mountains are also full of wildlife. Scientists have found 90 different kinds of birds in the Trikuta Hills, and most of them eat insects. The soil is also healthy and full of tiny life forms that help the environment stay balanced. However, the environment of the Trikuta Mountains is very delicate. Because millions of pilgrims visit the area every year, scientists are now studying how this heavy tourism affects the fragile ecosystem of the hills.

== Mythology and cultural significance ==
The name "Trikuta" means "three peaks." In Hindu stories, Trikuta was the name of a young woman who prayed deeply to marry Vishnu and who later became the goddess Vaishno Devi. In the ancient epic, the Ramayana, Trikuta is also the name of the mountain where the demon king Ravana built his city of Lanka.

Local legends say that the shrine's cave was first discovered by a devoted man named Pandit Shridhar, who lived in the nearby village of Hansali at the base of the mountain. The Vaishno Devi cave shrine, historically referred to by names including Tarkota, Traikakud, Trikata, and Trikta Devi. Located at an altitude of nearly 6,000 feet at the end of a rugged nine-mile trek, the shrine houses three Pindi that symbolize the tridevi, making Trikuta a site of religious importance.

== Tourism ==
To help spread out the crowds from the main pilgrimage path, the government has developed new trekking routes through the tribal areas of the Trikuta hills. These trails allow visitors to explore the lush green forests and experience the natural beauty of the mountain beyond the main shrine.

== See also ==
- Sacred mountains of India
