= Pindi (Hindu iconography) =

Abstract manifestations of the mother goddess Shakti

Pindi are decked stones or tree stumps viewed in Hinduism as abstract manifestations of the mother goddess Shakti. Most of the 20th-century goddess temples in Himachal Pradesh, India, enshrine a pindi.

== See also ==
- Lingam
