= Vaishno Devi =

Hindu mother goddess

- Mother Goddess; Goddess of hills
- Other names: Vaishnavi, Trikuta, Lakshmi, Sheravali, Adikumari, Narayani, Vishnumaya, Amba
- Devanagari: वैष्णो देवी
- Venerated in: Hinduism, Shaktism, Vaishnavism
- Associate: Hanuman and Bhaironath
- Abode: Vaishno Devi Temple, Katra, India
- Weapons: Sword, trishul, discus, club, lotus
- Animals: monkeys
- Symbols: Holy Pindis
- Height: Five-and-a-half-foot-tall petrified rock platform upon which the three holy pindis reside
- Day: Tuesday
- Complexion: Her three Pindis are whitish (Saraswati), yellowish-red (Lakshmi), and black (Kali)
- Mount: Lion and Tiger
- Gender: Female
- Region: Jammu region (Trikuta Hills, Siwaliks)
- Temples: Vaishno Devi Bhavan (Holy Cave), Kol Kandoli, Deva Mai, Bhoomika Mandir, and Bhairon Temple
- Festivals: Navaratras, Diwali

Genealogy
- Avatar birth: South India
- Parents: King Ratnākara (father)
- Consort: Kalki

Vaishno Devi, also known as Vaishnavi, Trikuta, and Sherawali, is a Hindu deity considered to have the nature of Shakti and, at the Vaishno Devi Temple, is self-manifest as three Pindis described as the goddesses Mahakali, Mahalakshmi, and Mahasaraswati. She is worshipped as an ascetic, vegetarian, and virgin goddess who is associated with Vishnu. Believed to be the Mahadevi, she is revered as a divine "Mother" who protects and grants boons to her devotees. She is also described in some regional traditions as the eldest of the Seven Sisters goddesses of North India.

== Origin ==
The earliest mention of Vaishno Devi is found in the Mahabharata. As the armies of the Pandavas and Kauravas were drawn up on the battlefield of Kurukshetra, Lord Krishna advised Arjuna, the chief warrior of the Pandavas, to meditate upon the Mother Goddess to seek her blessings for victory. While praying, Arjuna addressed the Mother Goddess with the phrase ‘Jambookatak Chityaishu Nityam Sannihitalaye’. This translates to "you who always dwell in the temple on the slope of the mountain in Jamboo," which is believed to refer to present-day Jammu.

Historically, there is no single, authoritative text that definitively explains the specific origin and identity of the goddess Vaishno Devi. However, the name "Vaishnavi" is listed among the 108 names of the Mahadevi in the Devi Mahatmya. Additionally, the Rig-Veda mentions the Trikuta mountain and provides early evidence of Shakti worship in the region.

She was originally a local, non-Aryan tribal goddess revered as Trikuta Devi, named after the three-peaked mountain where her presence was felt. Over time, a cultural synthesis and compromise emerged between the local non-Aryan tribes and immigrant Aryans, which led to the local deity Trikuta Devi being assimilated and identified as the pan-Hindu goddess Vaishno Devi. This cultural integration and the broader popularity of her cult received a massive boost following a substantial influx of Aryan immigrants after the 12th century. Furthermore, historical records show that the 12th-century Kashmiri historian Kalhana was well aware of her, noting that the worship of Vaishno Devi was already established in the region during early times. Additionally, the deity is recognized as the Kula Devi of the Dogra rulers, associated with Kalka Devi of the Bahu Fort, with historical links tracing back to the early medieval period.

== Iconography ==
In the Sanctum Sanctorum (the Holy Cave) at Trikuta Mountain, Vaishno Devi appears as three natural rock formations called the Holy Pindis, not as sculptures. These pindis sit atop a five-and-a-half-foot rock base and differ in color and texture. They symbolize the three primary Shakti of the universe. The pindi on the extreme left of Mata Maha Saraswati has a whitish tinge, representing the Sattva Guna (the quality of purity) and the Supreme Energy of Creation, intellect, wisdom, and righteousness, The middle pindi of Maha lakshmi Vaishnavi features a yellowish-red tinge, representing the Rajas Guna (the quality of inspiration and effort) and the Supreme Energy of Maintenance, wealth, and prosperity, and The pindi on the extreme right of Maha Kali is black in color, representing the Tamas Guna (the quality of darkness and the unknown) and the Supreme Energy of Dissolution and destruction.

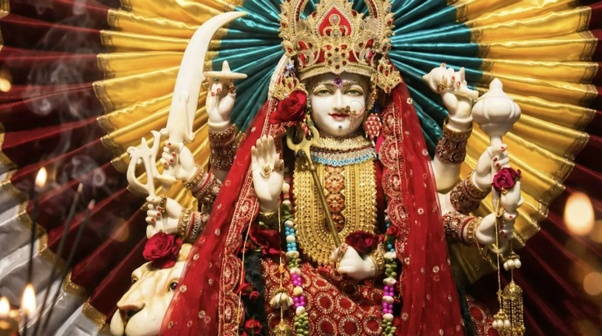
Maa Vaishno Devi Idol

Outside the cave, in widely circulated posters, calendars, and statues, Vaishno Devi's iconography heavily overlaps with that of the Goddess Durga. In this popular anthropomorphic form:

- She is depicted as a beautiful young woman dressed in a red sari and wearing a crown, riding a lion or a tiger.
- She is usually portrayed with eight arms (though sometimes four or eighteen).
- In her hands, she wields an assortment of weapons such as a sword, trident, discus, club, bow, lotus and a conch.
- One of her right hands is typically raised in a gesture signifying reassurance or blessing.

== Legends ==
=== Vaishno devi Legend ===
The story of Mata Vaishno Devi begins in the Treta Yuga, when Maha Saraswati, Maha Lakshmi, and Maha Kali pooled their tejas to create a powerful new deity named Vaishnavi, whose purpose was to uphold righteousness and destroy evil. Vaishnavi was born in southern India in the home of Ratnakar Sagar, a devoted man, and soon began displaying miraculous powers and a deep desire to attain spiritual enlightenment. Seeking the ultimate spiritual peak, she went into the forest to practice rigorous meditation to win Vishnu as her husband.

When Vishnu incarnated as Rama and was passing through the forest, Vaishnavi immediately recognized him and pleaded with him to marry her. Rama explained that he could not accept her proposal because he had vowed to have only one wife, Sita, in his current incarnation. However, he promised that he would return to her during the Kali Yuga in his incarnation as Kalki, and he would marry her then. Until that time, he instructed her to head north to the Trikuta Hills to set up an ashram in a holy cave and meditate, spreading righteousness and granting boons to her devotees.

=== Pandit Shridhar's Feast and the Pursuit ===
Hundreds of years later, during the Kali Yuga, Vaishnavi appeared as a divine young girl to Pandit Shridhar, a poor but deeply devoted Brahmin living in the village of Hansali, near present-day Katra. She instructed him to organize a grand feast for the local villagers and ascetics. Despite his extreme poverty and anxiety over how to feed so many people, the divine girl miraculously provided endless, delicious food for everyone who attended.

During this feast, a Tantrik disciple named Bhairon Nath arrived and demanded meat and liquor. The girl politely refused, explaining that such items were prohibited at a Brahmin's vegetarian feast. Enamored by her extraordinary beauty and angered by her refusal, Bhairon Nath attempted to grab her, forcing her to flee into the Trikuta mountains. As she escaped, she created several sacred landmarks that pilgrims still visit today. She shot an arrow into the ground to create the Banganga stream to quench the thirst of her companion and wash her hair. She paused to look back to see if she was being followed at Charan paduka, leaving her footprints eternally engraved on a rock. She then hid and meditated for nine months inside a narrow, womb-shaped cave at Adhkuwari, a spot now famously known as Garbhjoon.

=== Slaying of Bhairon Nath and the Boon ===
When Bhairon Nath eventually located her at the Garbhjoon cave, she blasted her way out the other end with her trident and continued her ascent to the holy cave at the top of the mountain. Bhairon Nath relentlessly pursued her there, leaving her no choice but to assume the terrifying form of Goddess Kali (or Chandika). With a mighty blow, she beheaded him; his torso fell at the cave's entrance, while his severed head was flung to an adjacent mountain top. In his dying moments, Bhairon Nath realized his grave mistake, repented for his sins, and begged for her forgiveness. The merciful Vaishnavi forgave him and granted him a final boon that any pilgrim's journey to her shrine would only be considered complete after they also visited his temple.

=== Manifestation of the Holy Pindis ===
Following this encounter, Vaishnavi decided to shed her human form entirely. She immersed herself in eternal meditation, manifesting as a five-and-a-half-foot-tall rock with three natural heads, or Pindis, at the top. These three Pindis uniquely represent Maha Kali, Maha Lakshmi, and Maha Saraswati, and they constitute the sanctum sanctorum of the Holy Cave today. Distraught over her disappearance, Pandit Shridhar was later guided by a dream from the Goddess to discover this cave, and he dedicated the rest of his life to her worship; this tradition is continued by his descendants, known as the Baridars.

=== The legend of Baba Jittoo ===
The identity of the Vaishno Devi shrine is deeply intertwined with regional Dogri folklore. A prominent example is "The Story of Baba Jittoo," described as a "long and complex myth" originating in the Jammu region in the 15th century. In this legend, Baba Jittoo is depicted as a "poor peasant" and a devout "devotee of Mata Vaishno Devi." As analyzed by scholars, the myth functions as a social charter, illustrating "how Vaishno Devi helps her devotees gain... bountiful harvests, and protection from enemies," particularly supporting "poor peasants who are exploited by kings and landlords." This narrative exemplifies a classic syncretism, where the pan-Hindu goddess assumes an immanent, socio-economic role as a protector of the oppressed in local Dogri traditions.

== Pilgrimage route ==
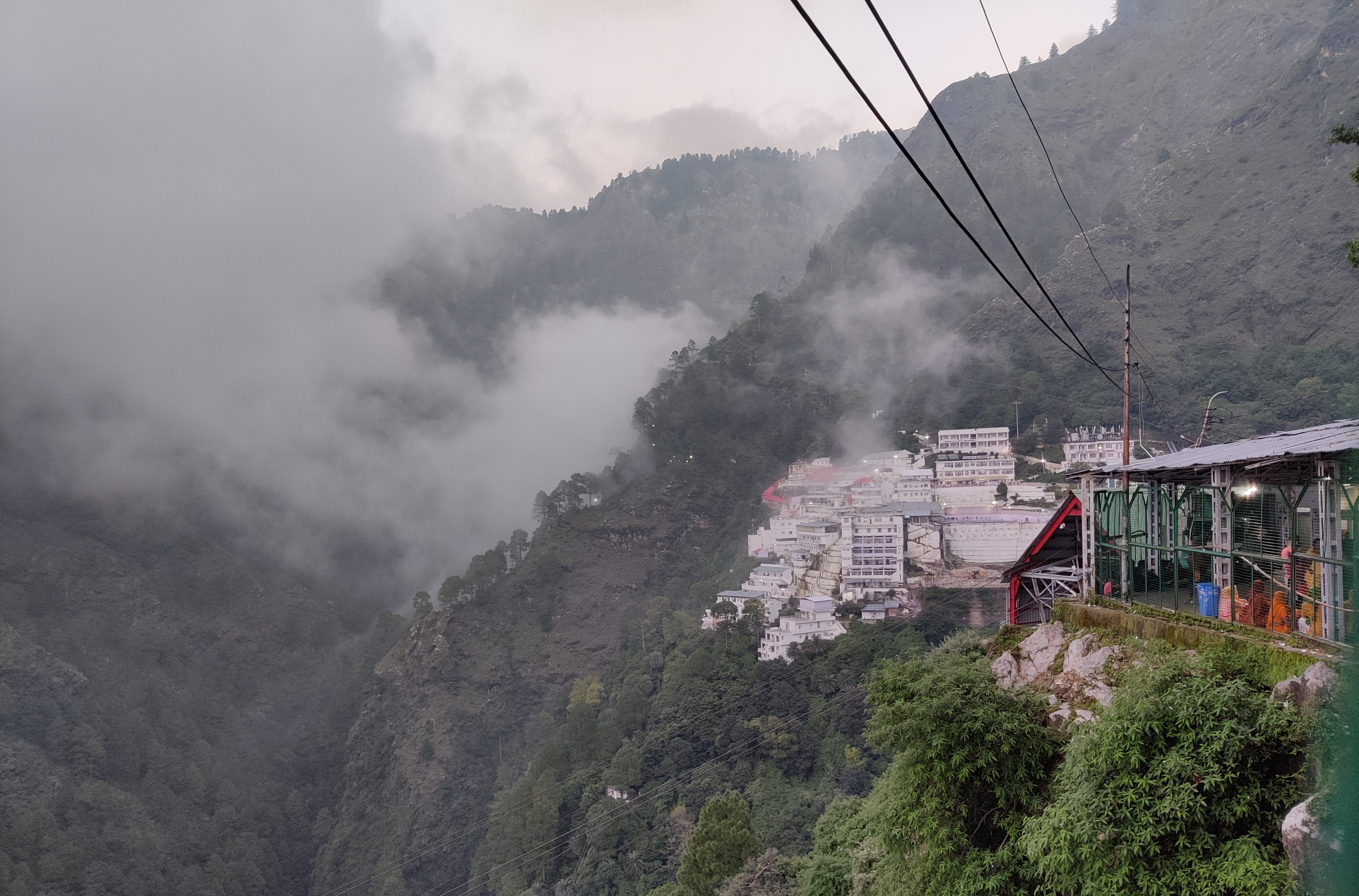
A view of Vaishno Devi Bhawan

According to Hindu legend, the pilgrimage route follows the path the goddess took while fleeing the tantric Bhairav Nath. The first major stop is Ardh Kumari, a cave where the Devi is said to have meditated for nine months. This cave is also known as Garbh Joon, or the "Womb Cave," as the shape of the cave is narrow and devotees must crawl through it, symbolizing a spiritual rebirth.

The legend states that when Bhairav Nath located her at Ardh Kumari, the goddess used her Trishul to strike the back wall of the cave, creating a new opening. She then escaped through this passage and continued her journey to the main Holy Cave on Trikuta Mountain.

The final confrontation occurred at the entrance of the Holy Cave (now the Bhawan). After being pursued to this location, the Devi assumed the ferocious form of Mahakali and beheaded Bhairav Nath. According to the narrative, his body fell at the entrance to the Holy Cave, while the force of the blow flung his head to a distant, adjacent peak.

The legend concludes with Bhairav Nath's repentance. As his head lay on the peak, he realized the Devi's true divinity and begged for forgiveness. The Goddess granted him salvation and a boon: that no pilgrimage to her shrine would be considered complete unless the devotee also paid respects at the Bhairav Nath Temple, which now stands at the location where his head is said to have fallen. This is why pilgrims traditionally visit the Bhairav Nath temple after having darshan at the main Holy Cave.

== Temple ==
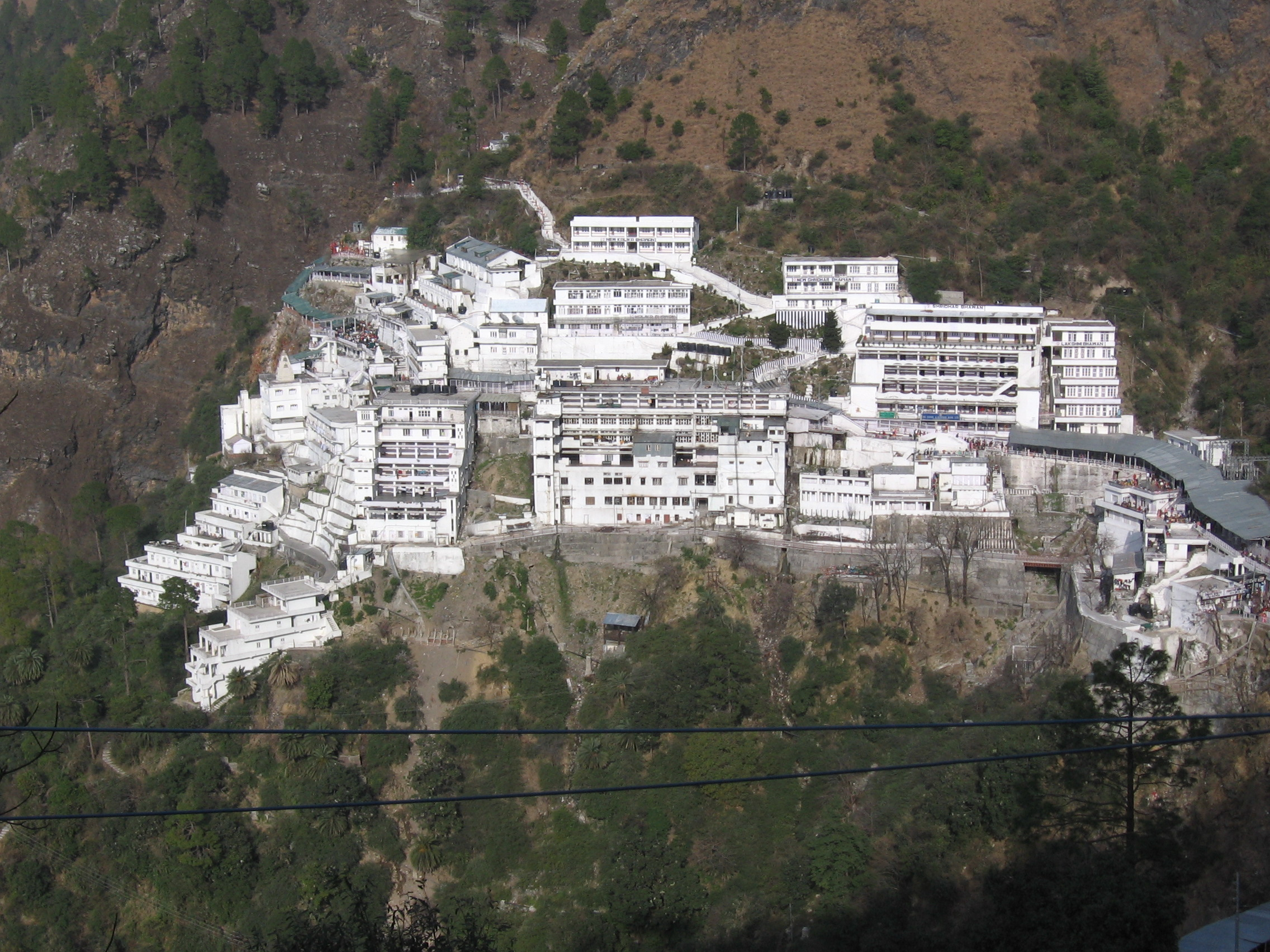
The Vaishno Devi temple in 2008

The Vaishno Devi Temple is an important Hindu temple dedicated to Vaishno Devi located in Katra at the Trikuta Mountains within the Indian Union territory of Jammu and Kashmir. It is one of the most visited pilgrimage centers of India. Every year, millions of visitors visit the temple. During festivals like Navaratri, the count even reaches one crore visitors. Vaishno Devi Temple is one of the richest temples in India. Authors Michael Barnett and Janice Gross Stein say, "Mata Vaishno Devi Shrine in Jammu has an annual income of about $16 billion, mainly from offerings by devotees".

== See also ==
- Jag Janani Maa Vaishno Devi - Kahani Mata Rani Ki
- Jhandewalan Temple
- Vaishnodevi Temple, Rourkela
- Shri Mata Vaishno Devi University

== Bibliography ==
- Kapoor, Sindhu (2021). Mata Vaishno Devi: Mythology, History and Heritage. Oberoi Book Service.
- Pintchman, Tracy, ed. (2001). Seeking Mahādevī: Constructing the Identities of the Hindu Great Goddess. State University of New York Press. ISBN 978-0-7914-9049-5.
- Singh, Rana P. B., ed. (2009). Planet Earth & Cultural Understanding: A Series (PDF). Cambridge Scholars.
