= Maharana Pratap Sagar =

Reservoir in India

- Pong Dam Lake
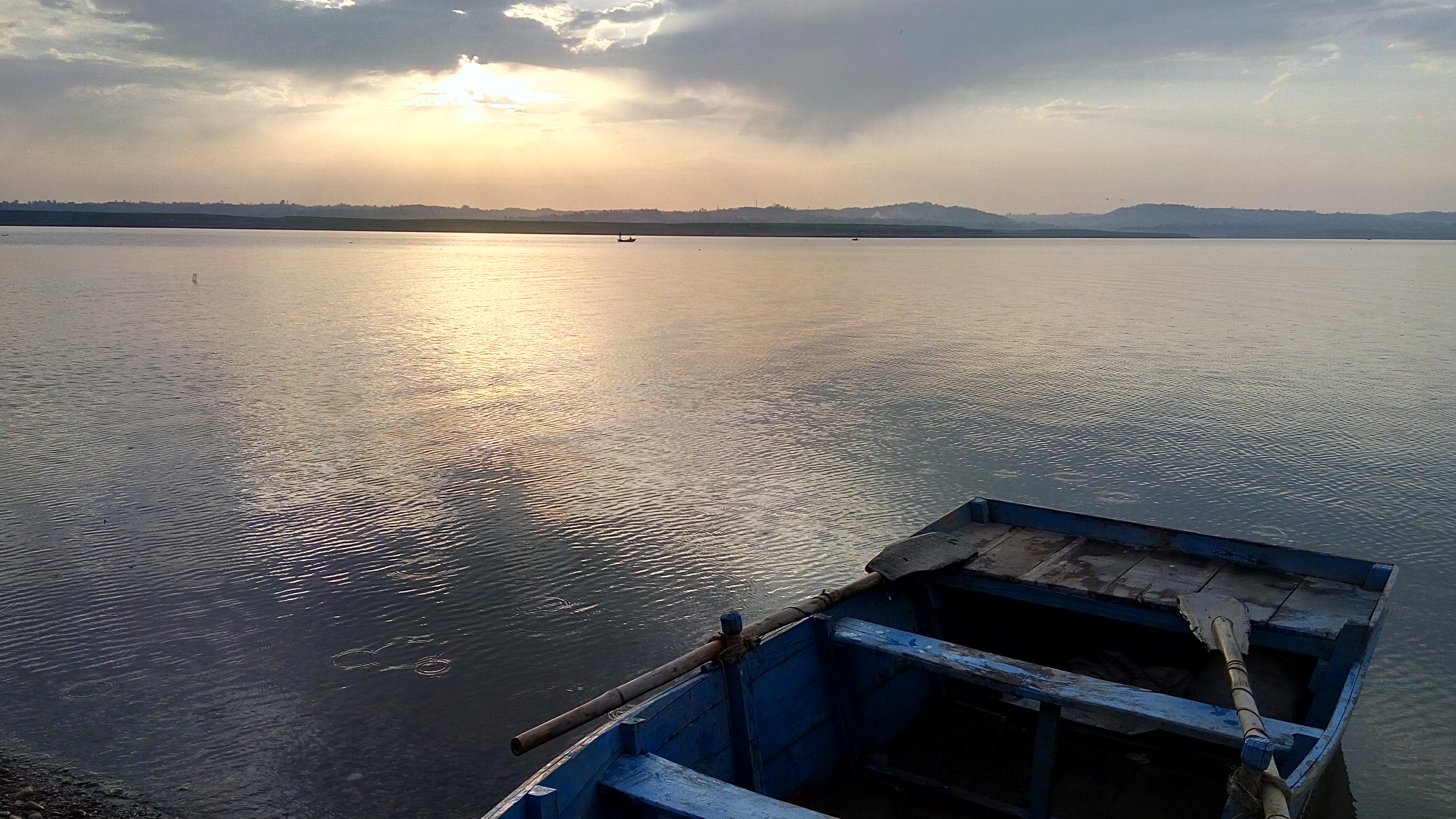
- The reservoir

- Location within Himachal Pradesh Location within India
- Location: Kangra district, Himachal Pradesh
- Coordinates: 32°01′N 76°05′E
- Type: reservoir (low altitude)
- Catchment area: 12,561 km^{2} (4,850 sq mi)
- Basin countries: India
- Max. length: 42 kilometres (26 mi)
- Max. width: 15 kilometres (9.3 mi)
- Surface area: 240 km^{2} (93 sq mi), and 450 km^{2} (174 sq mi) during floods
- Max. depth: 97.84 m (321.0 ft)
- Water volume: 8,570 million cubic metres (8.57 km^{3}; 6.95×10^{6} acre⋅ft)
- Surface elevation: 436 m (1,430.4 ft)
- Islands: Several
- Settlements: Pong & Bharmar Shivothan

Ramsar Wetland
- Official name: Pong Dam Lake
- Designated: 19 August 2002
- Reference no.: 1211

Maharana Pratap Sagar, also known as Pong Reservoir or Pong Dam Lake, is a large reservoir in Fatehpur, Jawali and Dehra tehsil of Kangra district of the state of Himachal Pradesh in India. It was created in 1975, by building the highest earthfill dam in India on the Beas River in the wetland zone of the Siwalik Hills. Named in the honour of Maharana Pratap (1540–1597), the reservoir or the lake is a well-known wildlife sanctuary and one of the 90+ international wetland sites declared in India by the Ramsar Convention. The reservoir covers an area of 24,529 hectares (60,610 acres), and the wetlands portion is 15,662 hectares (38,700 acres).

The Pong Reservoir and Gobindsagar Reservoir are the two most important fishing reservoirs in the Himalayan foothills of Himachal Pradesh. These reservoirs are the leading sources of fish within the Himalayan states. Several towns and villages were submerged in the reservoir and many families were displaced as a result.

== Location ==
The closest railway stations to the project are Mukerian, at 30 km (18.6 mi), and Pathankot, at 32 km (19.9 mi). Nagrota Surian and Jawali, located on the periphery of the reservoir, are connected by a narrow gauge railway line, on the Kangra railway line, which connects Pathankot to Jogindernagar.

The reservoir is connected by a good network of roads to major cities in Himachal Pradesh and Punjab.

Distance from the main cities

- Distance from Shimla – 233.2 km (144.9 mi)
- Distance from Chandigarh – 272.9 km (169.5 mi)
- Distance from Amritsar – 110 km (68.4 mi)
- Distance from Dharamsala – 55 km (34.2 mi)
- Distance from Kangra – 50 km (31.1 mi)
- Distance from Chintapurni – 18 km (11.3 mi)
- Distance from Jwalamukhi – 12 km (7.45 mi)

Apart from the airports at Chandigrah and Amritsar which are far off, the closest airport to the reservoir is Pathankot and Gaggal. Maharana Pratap Lake to Bharmar Distance 12 km.

== Topography ==
The reservoir is bounded by the rugged Dhauladhar mountain range, the low foothills of the Himalaya on the northern edge of the Indo-Gangetic plains, and the mountain streams cutting through valleys.

== Hydrology and engineering features ==
=== Hydrology ===
The Beas River, on which the Pong Dam is located, is one of the five major rivers of the Indus basin. The river flows from the Beas Kund near Rohtang Pass, in the upper Himalayas, and traverses generally in a north–south direction until Largi, from where it turns sharply at nearly a right angle and flows in a westerly direction up to the Pong Dam. The river traverses a total length of about 116 km (72 mi) from the source to the Pong Dam.

The reservoir drains a catchment area of 12,561 km^{2} (4,850 sq mi), out of which the permanent snow catchment is 780 km^{2} (301 sq mi). Monsoon rainfall between July and September is a major source of water supply into the reservoir, apart from snow and glacier melt. The project area experiences hot summers, with maximum temperature of 40 °C (104 °F), with hot and humid climate. Winters are fairly cold and mostly dry. The dam acts as a sponge for flood flows, and reservoir regulation prevents the inundation of surrounding upland areas from routine flooding during the monsoon season. The reservoir stretch is 42 km long (26 mi) with a maximum width of 19 km (11.8 mi), and with a mean depth of 35.7 m (117 ft). While the surface water temperature varies between 22.2–25.1 °C (72.0–77.2 °F), the incoming river water has a temperature range of 6–26 °C (42.8–78.8 °F).

=== Engineering features ===
Subsequent to the partition of India, the waters of the Indus river system were allocated river wise, with certain stipulations, as per the Indus Water Treaty (1960), between India and Pakistan. India got exclusive use of the three eastern rivers (the Ravi, the Beas and the Satluj) and Pakistan got the exclusive use of the three western rivers (the Indus, the Jhelum and the Chenab). Following this treaty, India prepared a master plan to utilize the waters of 3 rivers which came to its share. and the Bhakra Dam was constructed across Satluj River. Then, the Beas River was tapped in two stages, with the Pong Dam forming the second stage development. Ravi River has also been developed through the Ranjit Sagar Dam Project or Thein Dam. All three river developments are multipurpose in nature involving irrigation, water supply and hydropower generation.

The Beas Dam has been built on the Beas River as it enters the plains at Talwara, also called as another temple of modern India. It is an earth core gravel shell dam of 435 ft (132.6 m) height above the deepest foundation, and it is the highest earthfill dam in India. The reservoir or the lake has a storage capacity of 8,570 million cubic metres (303 billion cubic feet). The designed maximum flood discharge of 437,000 cu ft/s (12,400 m^{3}/s) is discharged through a gated chute spillway (pictured) located on the left abutment of the dam.

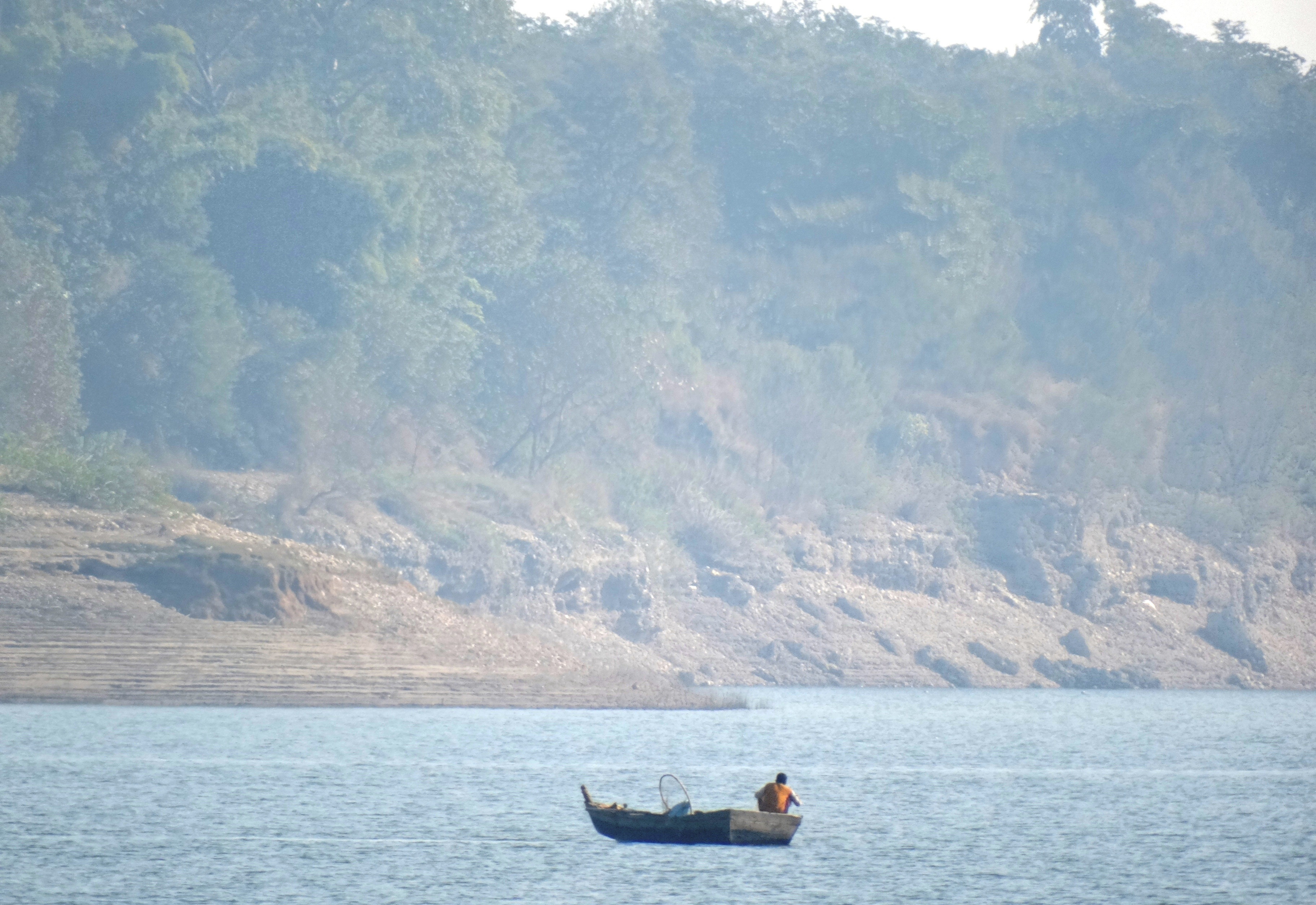
Fishing in dam

The confirmed ruling features of the dam are detailed below:

- Top of dam – 436 m (1,430 ft)
- Normal reservoir level – 427 m (1,401 ft)
- Maximum reservoir level – 433 m (1,421 ft)
- Dead storage level – 384 m (1,260 ft)
- Gross storage capacity: 8,570,000,000 cubic metres (6,950,000 acre⋅ft)
- Live storage capacity: 7,290,000,000 cubic metres (5,910,000 acre⋅ft)
- Reservoir length: 41.8 km (26.0 mi)
- Maximum reservoir depth: 97.84 m (321.0 ft)

The hydro-power plant located downstream, on the right side of the spillway structure, was initially planned for an installed capacity of 360 megawatts (480,000 hp), with six generating units: 6x60 megawatts (80,000 hp). This was later upgraded to 6x66 megawatts (89,000 hp), totalling a capacity of 396 megawatts (531,000 hp) as of 2012. Water from the reservoir is led into the power house through penstock pipes, each of 5.025-metre (16.5 ft) diameter.

Reservoir operation is a crucial aspect since both Bhakra Dam and Pong Dam Projects necessitate their operation in an 'integrated manner' to achieve optimal benefits of irrigation and power. Water stored in the reservoir during the summer and rainy season, after meeting with the irrigation requirements of the partner states, is released in a regulated manner during lean periods, in a fixed schedule of Filling Period–Depletion Period for both the reservoirs. The filling and depletion period for

- the Bhakra reservoir is from 21 May to 20 September and 21 September to 20 May, and
- for Pong Dam reservoir, from 21 June to 20 and 21 September to 20 June respectively.

A technical committee of the Bhakra Beas Management Board (BBMB) authorizes the monthly releases appropriately honouring the requirements projected by the partner states. The operation manuals titled "Designer's Criteria for the Operation, Maintenance and Observation" for the Bhakra, Pong & Pando reservoirs, duly updated as required, provide the guiding rules for the efficient integrated operation of the reservoirs. The two reservoirs supply irrigation and drinking water to Punjab, Haryana, Rajasthan, Delhi and Chandigarh. Himachal Pradesh is also provided with drinking water supply.

== Water quality ==
The water-quality parameters recorded for the reservoir are:

- Secchi disc transparency 0.12–4.8 metres (0.4–15.7 ft); pH 7.0–8.4; silicates 3.0–5.0 mg/L; chlorides 6.0–7.0 mg/L; total hardness 22–28 mg/L, gives total hardness range from 19 to 68 mg/L; total alkalinity 53–81 mg/L; specific conductivity 173–190 μmhos.

== Flora and fauna ==
=== Ramsar site ===
Pong Dam Lake was declared a Ramsar Wetland site on account of its rich waterfowl diversity for conservation and sustainable use of the wetland. This recognition was based on a proposal formulated by the Himachal State Council for Science, Technology and Environment, Shimla submitted to the Ramsar Bureau, Switzerland through the Union Ministry of Environment and Forests of the Government of India.

The large reservoir and its strategic location in the extreme north-west of the northern plains has attracted migratory birds from the plains of India and Central Asian countries and Siberia. More than 220 bird species of 54 families have been recorded. The two-day waterfowl census, which ended on 1 Feb 2015, recorded over 130,000 birds in the Pong Dam Wetlands. The interception of the migratory birds on their trans-Himalayan fly path, during each migration season, has enriched the biodiversity values of the reservoir. The Pong reservoir and its catchment have the following rich flora and fauna.

=== Forest vegetation ===
The reservoir peripheral land area has mixed perennial and deciduous pine forests on hills. Eucalyptus trees have also been grown in the area. The forest growth provides enough sustenance to the migratory birds. The tree species of the forest area are acacia, jamun, shisham, mango, mulberry, ficus, kachanar, amla and prunus. A variety of shrubs, grasses and climbers have also been reported. The reservoir seasonal water-level variation between the maximum water level and the minimum draw-down level does not permit growth of much emergent vegetation, but some amount of submerged vegetation has been noticed.

=== Limnology ===
A wide variety of commercially viable fish, 27 species of 5 families, such as mahseer, catla, mirror carp, singhara (native) and others are recorded in the Pong Dam reservoir and its tributaries. Before the reservoir was built, catfishes, mirror carps and a few coarse fish were the dominant fish fauna in the Beas River. With the emergence of the reservoir, commercial fishing was encouraged as an important programme not only to provide employment to about 1500 fishermen but also to promote the eco-tourism potential. A planned operation of fish stocking was launched with first introduction of common carp in 1974 and Indian major carps or silver carp in 1976–77. This resulted in a shift in the catch structure of the reservoir, with carps accounting for 61.8% of the total landings in 1987–88. The present fish stocks in the reservoir, in the sequence of their abundance are: 1) rohu, Aorichthys seenghala, 2) Labeo calbasu (native), 3) Tor putitora (Himalayan mahseer), 4) Cirrhinus mrigala, 5) Wallago attu, 6) Cyprinus carpio, 7) Labeo dero, 8) Catla catla and 9) Channa sp. The reservoir, unlike other reservoirs in the region, has shown a marked growth in catch of mahseer fish, recording 20% of the total catch during 1999–2000 with the average size of the fish ranging from 1.5–1.7 kg (3.3–3.7 lb). This is attributed to the change in the Himachal Pradesh (HP) Fishing Rules, with an added clause which specifies the minimum catchable size for mahseer as 300–500 mm (10–20 in) or approximately 1.2 kg (2.6 lb). That rule is stated to give to each female mahseer to breed at least once before being caught.

Mahseer angling in the Pong Dam reservoir is said to be the only one of its kind in the country.

=== Bird sanctuary ===
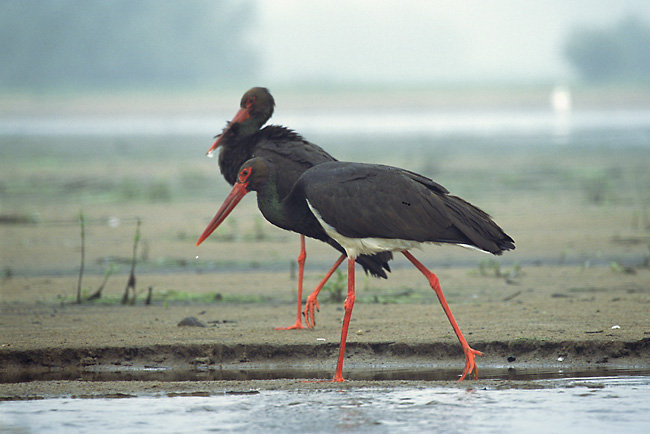
Black stork

The reservoir was declared as a bird sanctuary in 1983. A 5-kilometre (3.1 mi) belt from the periphery of the lake has been declared as buffer zone for the management of the bird sanctuary. The national, as well as international, significance of the sanctuary is enhanced because of its waterfowl diversity, which was evidenced by the increase of water fowl species from 39 prior to the reservoir to 54 species at post-reservoir stage. The number of birds reported, particularly during the winter period of November to March, has steadily increased over the years. The recent records indicate a water fowl count of 130,000 in 2004 and 142,000 during 2005 migratory birds – a major increase from the average annual count of 18,887 for the period 1988–1995. The main bird species reported are the bar-headed goose (Anser indicus), northern lapwing, ruddy shelduck, northern pintail, common teal, Indian spot-billed duck, Eurasian coot, red-necked grebe, black-headed gulls, plovers, black stork, terns, water-fowl and egrets.

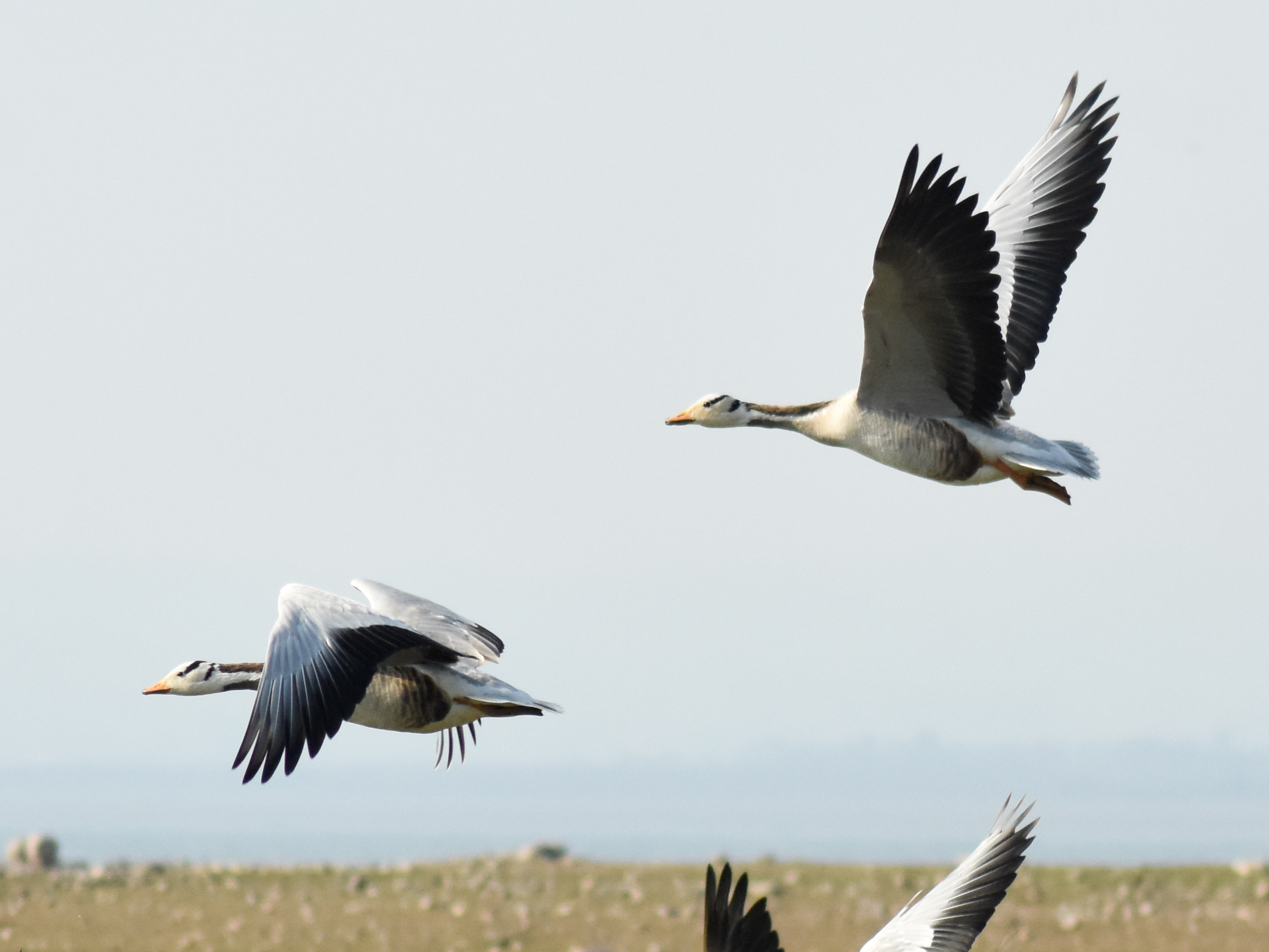
Bar-headed geese in flight near Nagrota Surian, January 2020

The avian habitats in the reservoir area are categorized under the following heads:

1. The receding shore–line form mudflats and mud spits from October onwards which provide organic matter, worms, insects and molluscs for wintering birds and plovers. Wagtails, sand larks and pipits also use the mudflats.
2. The shallow water on the margins of the reservoir and the open deep water are used by dabbling ducks (Anatinae) and some long-legged waders
3. In the sandy banks near the reservoir periphery with dry sand banks strewn with small boulders, with little or no vegetation, stone curlew and pratincoles feed here.
4. Below the outfall of the dam, swamp habitats and water side vegetation are used by birds such as ducks, coot, warblers, babblers, munias, kingfishers and predators.
5. In the reservoir drawdown areas, which are also cultivated by local people during winter, bar-headed geese and ruddy shelduck feed.

Around five thousand tourists visit the bird sanctuary during the winter season, and most of them come to watch migratory birds for the first time. Efforts are being made to encourage eco-tourism to attract more tourists to the reservoir.

=== Fauna ===
The periphery above the water surface area of the reservoir has recorded fauna species such as barking deer, sambar, wild boars, leopards and oriental small-clawed otters.

== Temple ==
The Bathu Temples are a cluster of ancient temples located 7 km from Jawali, a tehsil of Kangra district, which remain completely submerged in the waters of the reservoir for eight months of the year but emerge during March–June due to lower water level in these months.

== Water sports ==
A regional water-sports centre has been established in the Pong Dam Reservoir, which offers focused activities such as canoeing, rowing, sailing, and water skiing, apart from swimming. Training programmes are organized in water safety and rescue measures with three-tier water-sports courses: the basic course, intermediate course, and advanced course. Modern infrastructure facilities have been created with a 75-bed hostel and a 10-suite rest house. It is said to be the only centre of its type in the country. The reservoir is also used for water sports at Dehra which lies on National Highway en route to Jwalamukhi Temple and Dharamshala, though nothing much is done by governments in the past. People can boat at Dehra although there is a scarcity of boats for tourism and a dearth of berthing facilities. Locals have been demanding a water sports centre at Dehra for decades. Centuries old traditional wooden boats are still made by some families in Dehra, though the number of such craftsmen is decreasing.

== Protection measures ==
The following protection measures have enabled preservation of the reservoir ecosystem.

- Declaring the entire reservoir as a Wildlife Sanctuary in 1986 by the Himachal Pradesh government has mostly eliminated poaching. Nearly 40 village forest development committees are functioning to prevent poaching of birds, in addition to nine checkposts. Two mobile checkposts monitor suspicious activities in the sanctuary areas, in coordination with the established check posts. This vigilance programme has established Nagrota Surian, Guglara, Tairess, Jambal Bassi, Nandpur Bhatoli and Dehra as dwelling places for the migratory birds.
- To check siltation of the reservoir and to provide bird nesting places, plantation of the peripheral area of the lake has been undertaken in a large way.
- The Protected Area Management Plan envisages boundary protection, habitat improvement, tourism and regulation, roads and staff quarters and so forth.
- One of the islands in the reservoir has been named Ramsar (after the Ramsar Convention) and developed for nature conservation education, complete with a rest house and boating facility.
- Organised reservoir fishing with full support of the Department of Fisheries has provided opportunities to reservoir Oustee (project affected people due to submergence) families to take up fishing as a profession. As per the last report, more than 1,789 fishermen are engaged in fishing activities which generates secondary benefits to more than 1,000 families. A large number of fishermen cooperative societies are functioning in the reservoir.

== Gallery ==
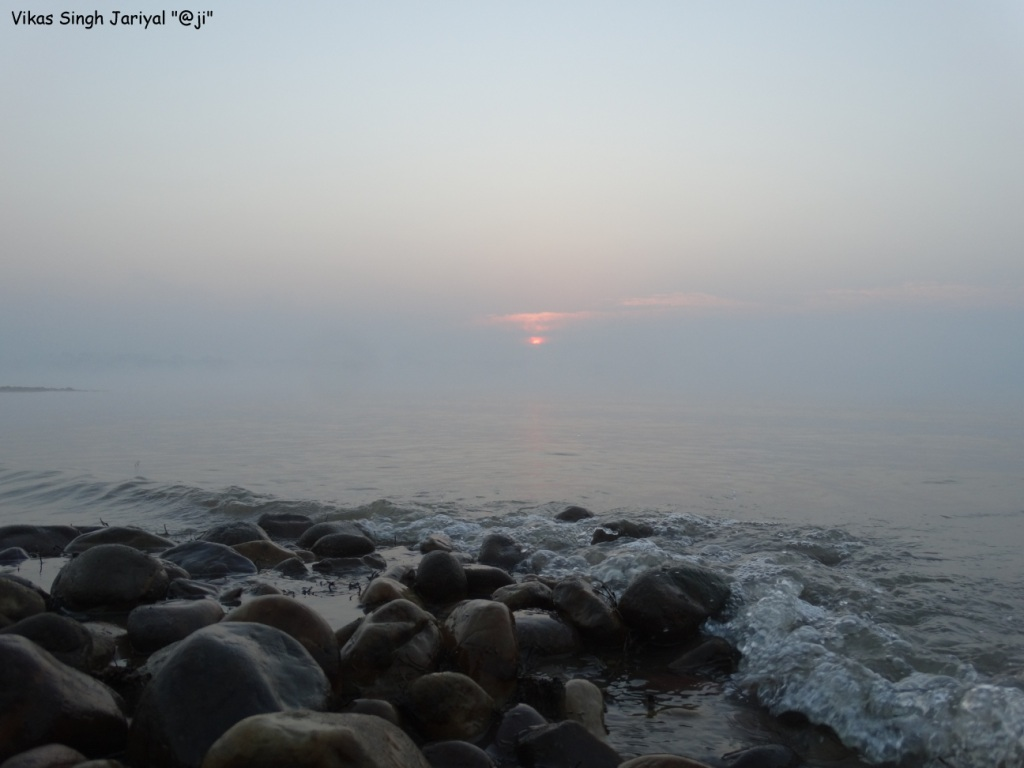
At Sunrise

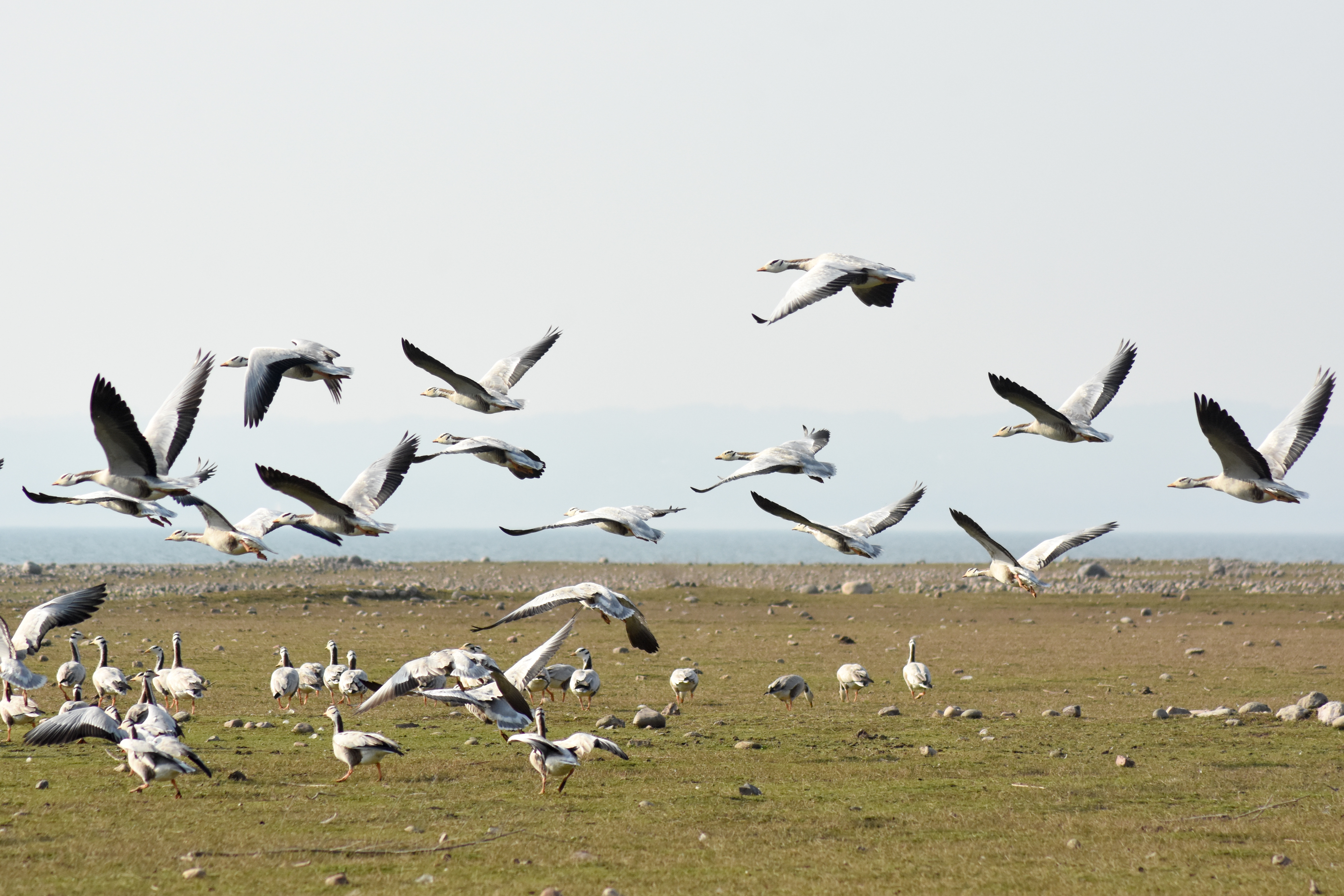
Barheaded geese in flight near Nagrota Surian

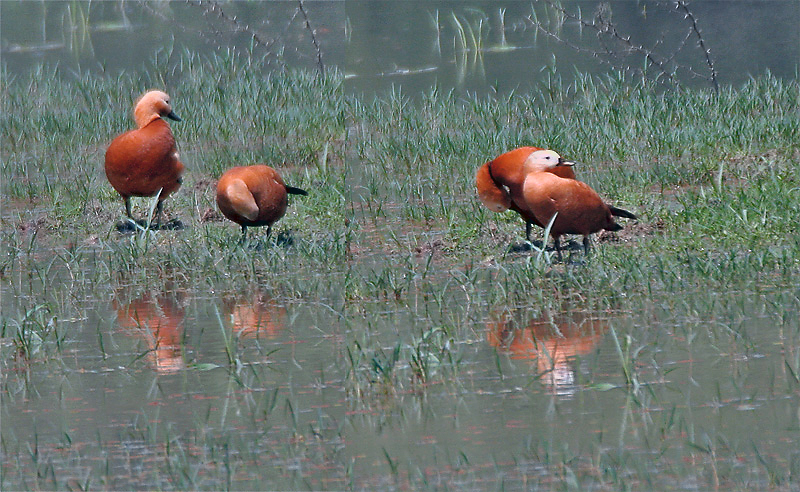
Ruddy shelduck (Tadorna ferruginea)

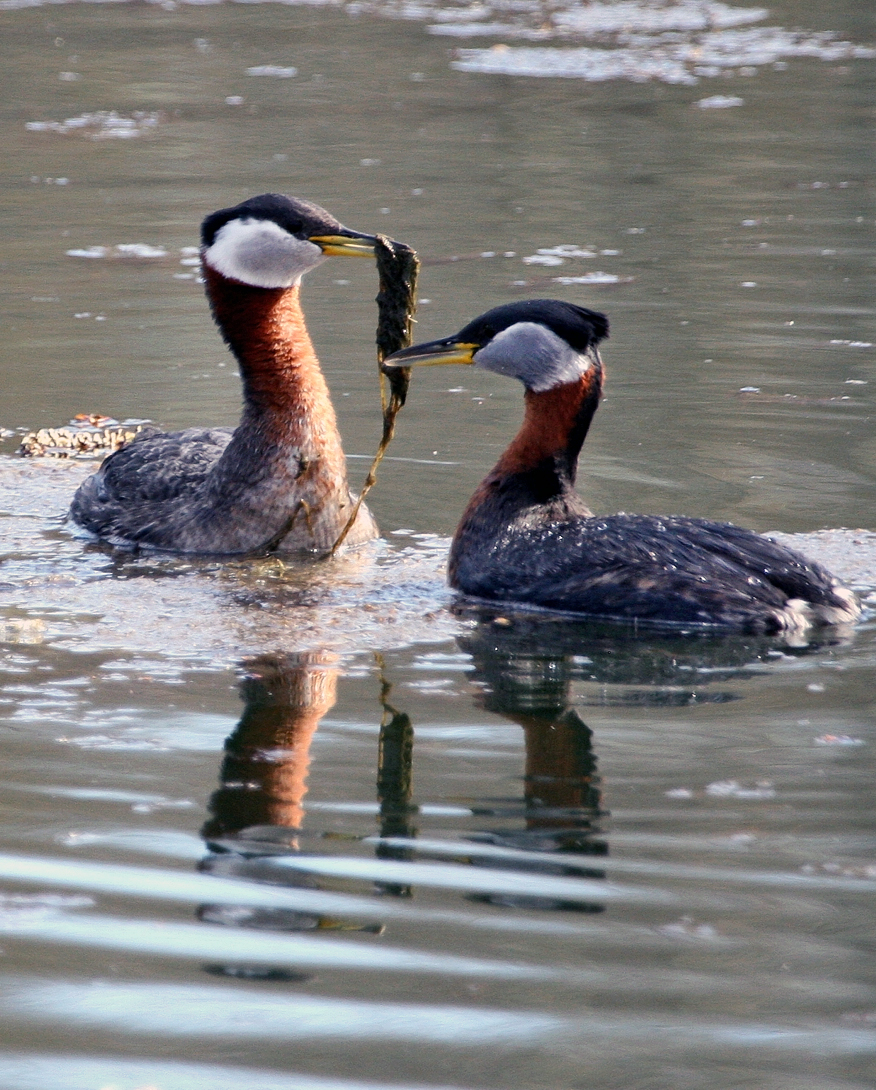
Red-necked grebe (Podiceps griseigena), recorded for the first time in India in 1987

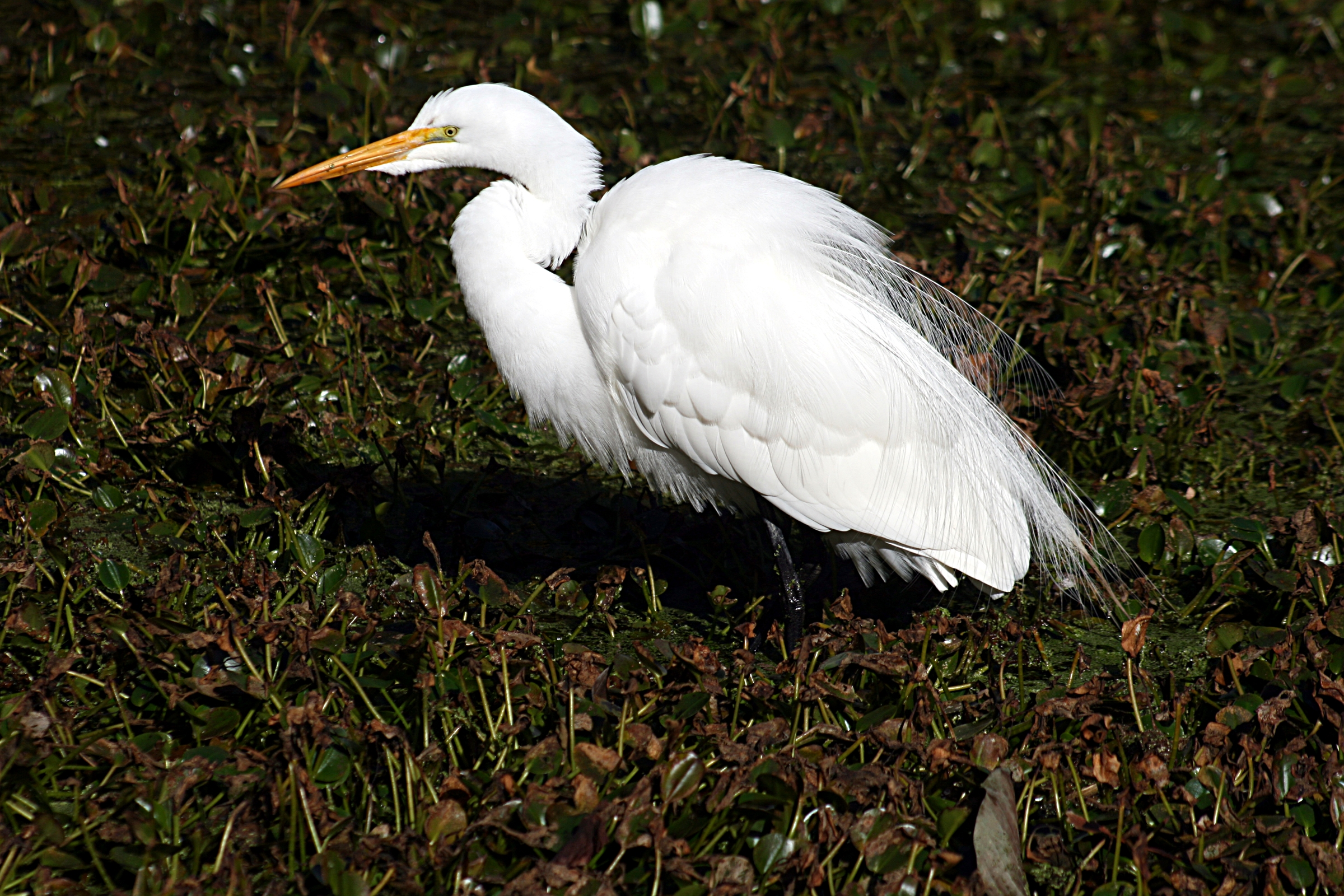
Egrets

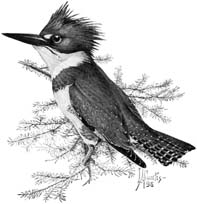
Kingfishers

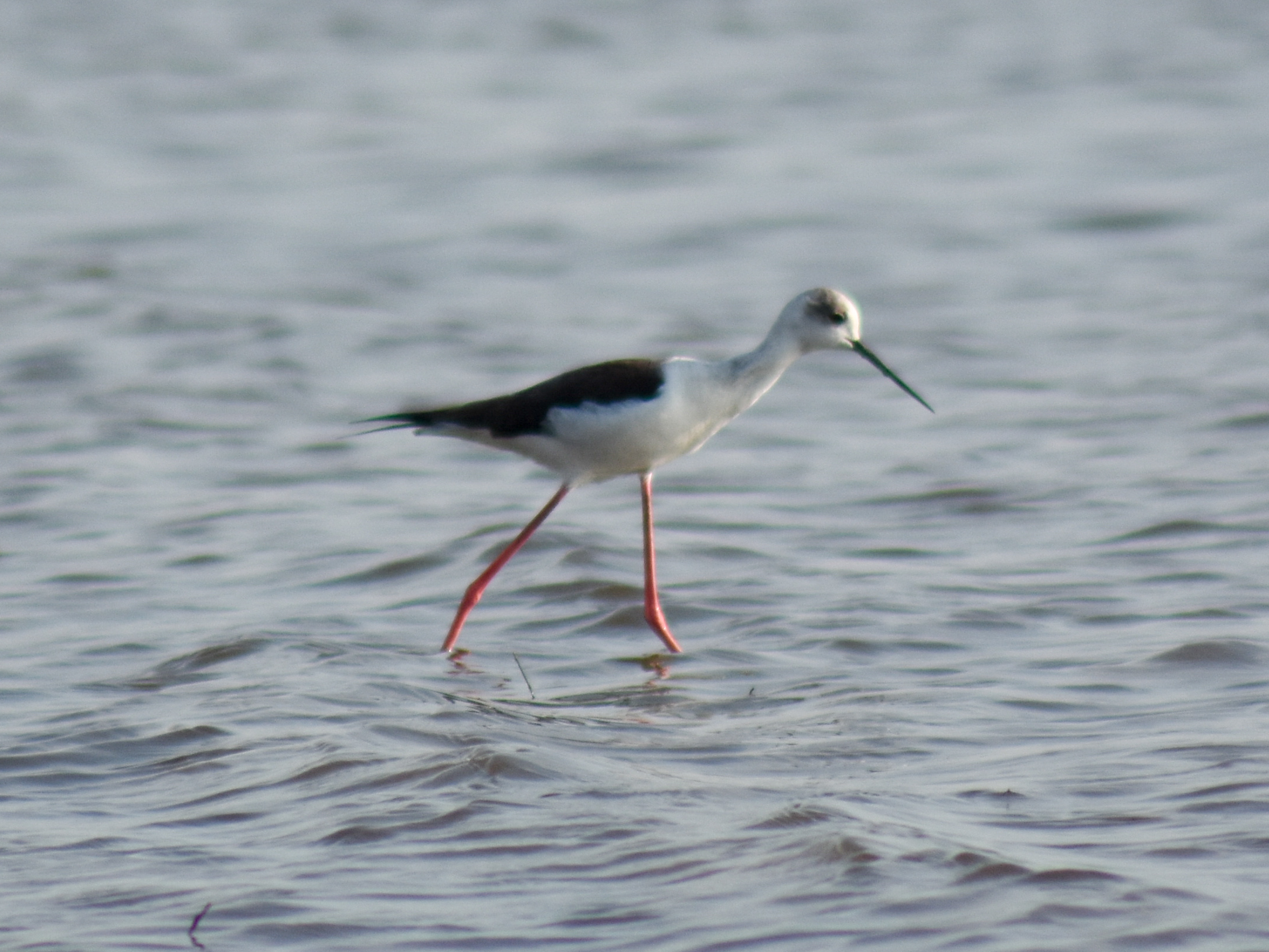
Black-winged stilt near Nagrota Surian

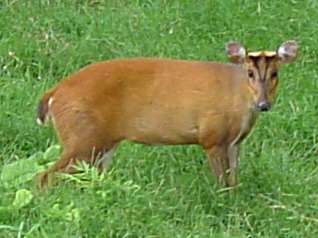
Muntjac deer, also known as barking deer

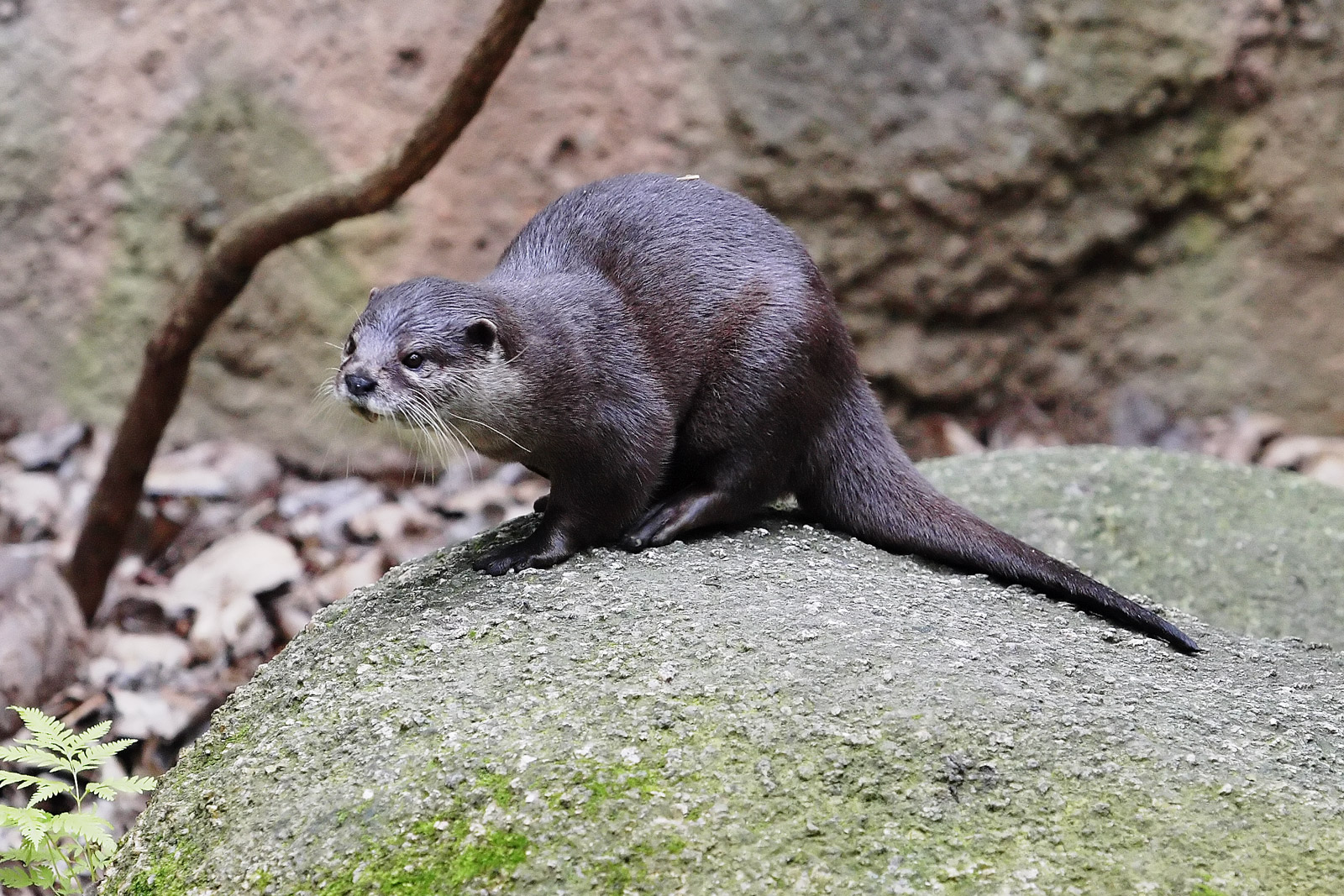
Asian small clawed otter

== See also ==
- Rana Pratap Sagar Dam
- Pong Dam
- Bhakra Dam
