= Dhameta =

- Village
- Interactive map of Dhameta
- Country: India
- State: Himachal Pradesh
- District: Kangra
- Time zone: UTC+5:30 (IST)
- PIN: 176 025

Dhameta is a village in Kangra district, Himachal Pradesh, India. Most of the villagers speak Pahari, Hindi or Punjabi, with Hindi most widely used. Panchayati Raj functions as a system of governance in Dhameta.

== Geography ==
The geographic coordinates of Dhameta are latitude 32.0459217 and longitude 75.9620529. Shimla, the state capital, is around 254.8 kilometres (158.3 mi) kilometers away from Dhameta. Chandigarh is 211.2 kilometres (131.2 mi) away, and Srinagar is 382.7 kilometres (237.8 mi). Dhameta is 74 kilometres (46 mi) away from its district headquarters Dharamshala.
Masrur Rock Temples are 1 hr 50 min 63.6 kilometres (39.5 mi) away via State Hwy 23.

The nearest railway station to Dhameta is Bharmar, 1 hr 5 min (36.3 km) via Maira Palli Rd away. Dhameta's nearest airport is Gaggal Airport located 63.6 kilometres (39.5 mi) away. Other airports around Dhameta include Pathankot Airport at 54.4 kilometres (33.8 mi) distance, and Bhuntar Airport at 232.7 kilometres (144.6 mi).

== Famous Landmarks ==
Famous Landmark in Dhameta are the submerged 'Bathu ki Ladi Temples' which can only be approached by boat from here or from Nagrota Surian or have to travel 23 km by road from Dhameta.

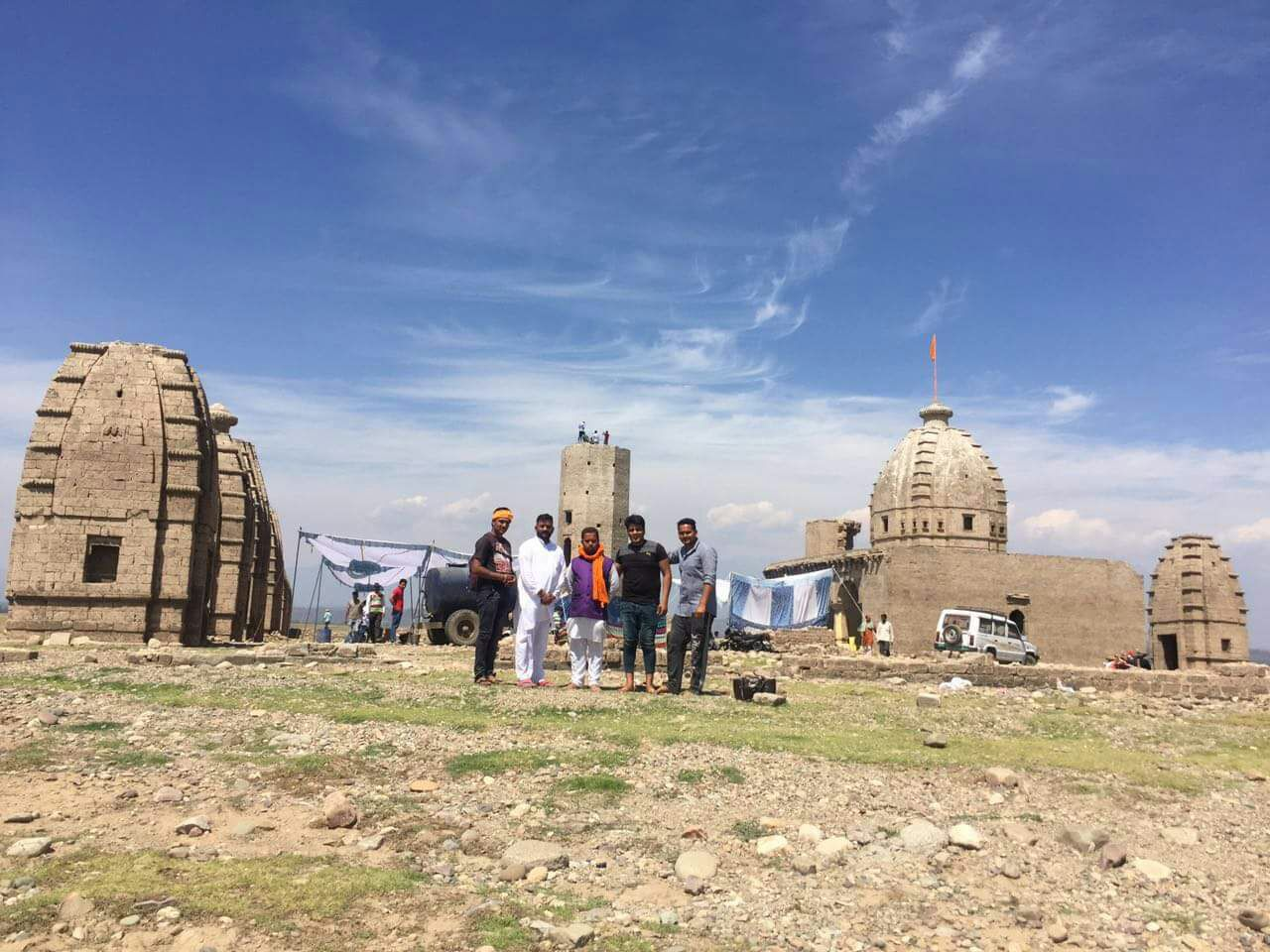
Bathu_ki_ladi

The folklore tells a story dating back to Mahabharata when Pandavas attempted to build a staircase to ascend to Heaven at monolithic Masrur Rock Temples located on the opposite of the lake but we're stopped by Indira. But, successfully built the 'Stairway to Heaven' at 'Bathu ki Ladi' temples where that staircase still exists even today and one can climb to the top most part to have a feel. The central temple is dedicated to Lord Shiva

Other famous places in Dhameta township for pilgrims are Mansa Devi Temple and Shani Dev Temple in Lower Bazaar.

== Schools ==
The nearest schools to Dhameta are as follows: Govt. Sen. Sec. School Dhameta Gurukul Model School, Dhameta Adarsh Model High School Chatta Khad 1.3 km; Gyan Jyoti Public School 2.2 km; Primary Middle School 2.4 km; Siyal Primary School 4.1 km.

== Architects ==
The most reputed Architectural firm of north India "Sohal Group". Founded by Mr. Shubham Sohal in 2018, Situated at Lower Bazaar Dhameta.

== Shops ==
Lok Mitra Kendra Dhameta near Punjab National Bank Dhameta Madan sweet shop Dairy products, cheese, curd, cold drinks, fresh sweets, namkeen etc. are available at Madan Sweet shop at Lower Bazaar Dhameta

Mehra Sweet Shop Near Bus Stand. Fresh Sweets, Snacks, Cold drink, Dairy Product available.

Madan Kariyana shop. Where all daily needs items are available. Location near to Madan sweet shop.
