= Jawali, Himachal Pradesh =

Jawali, Himachal Pradesh Jawanwala Shahar
- Jawali
- Location in Himachal Pradesh, India Jawali, Himachal Pradesh (India)
- Coordinates: 32.15°N 76.01°E
- Country: India
- State: Himachal Pradesh
- District: Kangra
- Elevation: 625 m (2,051 ft)
- Time zone: UTC+5:30 (IST)
- ZIP code(s): 176023
- Telephone code: 91-1893
- Vehicle registration: HP54
- Website: www.himachal.nic.in

Jawali (Jawāli) is a city in Kangra district of Himachal Pradesh, India. The nearest airports are about 40 km away: Pathankot Airport (IATA: (IXP, ICAO: VIPK) to the west and Kangra Airport (IATA: DHM, ICAO: VIGG) to the east of Jawali. The city can also be reached by broad-gauge rail up to Pathankot (PTX), and thereafter by the narrow-gauge Kangra Valley Railway from Pathankot to Jawanwala Shahr railway station (JWLS), which serves Jawali. By road, travelling from Pathankot along National Highway 154, the destination road bifurcates at Jassur, where HP SH 27 branches off. Further ahead at Raja Ka Talab, HP SH 22 diverges and passes through Jawali, connecting with National Highway 503 near Dera Gopipur and continuing towards Jawalamukhi where it meets National Highway 303.

Approach from Kangra Airport (Gaggal) to Jawali is via National Highway 154, followed by State Highway 23 and State Highway 22.

The town was formerly named Jawanwalashehar. Jawali is the second largest assembly constituency in the state of Himachal Pradesh.

It is located 250 km away from its state capital of Shimla and 50 km distance from its district headquarters of Dharamshala.

== Geography ==
Jawali is situated in Kangra district, Himachal Pradesh. There is a fort of a king which is situated near the bus stand of Jawali. The town also contains a historic temple, the Bathu Temples, which are located inside the reservoir area of Maharana Pratap Sagar (Pong Dam), constructed on the river Beas, which makes it accessible only for a few months when the water level drops.

== Temples ==
- Sheetla Mata Mandir is situated in Dhan, approx. 2 kilometres from Jawali.
- Vaishno Devi Mandir is situated in Dhan, approximately 2 kilometres from Jawali. This is one of the famous Hindu temple in Jawali. It is situated 2 km away from Jawali near Dhan village. we have to go either by walk or by Bus. Nearest railway station from dhan village is Jawanwala shehar.
- Mata Mansa Devi Mandir is in Jawali.

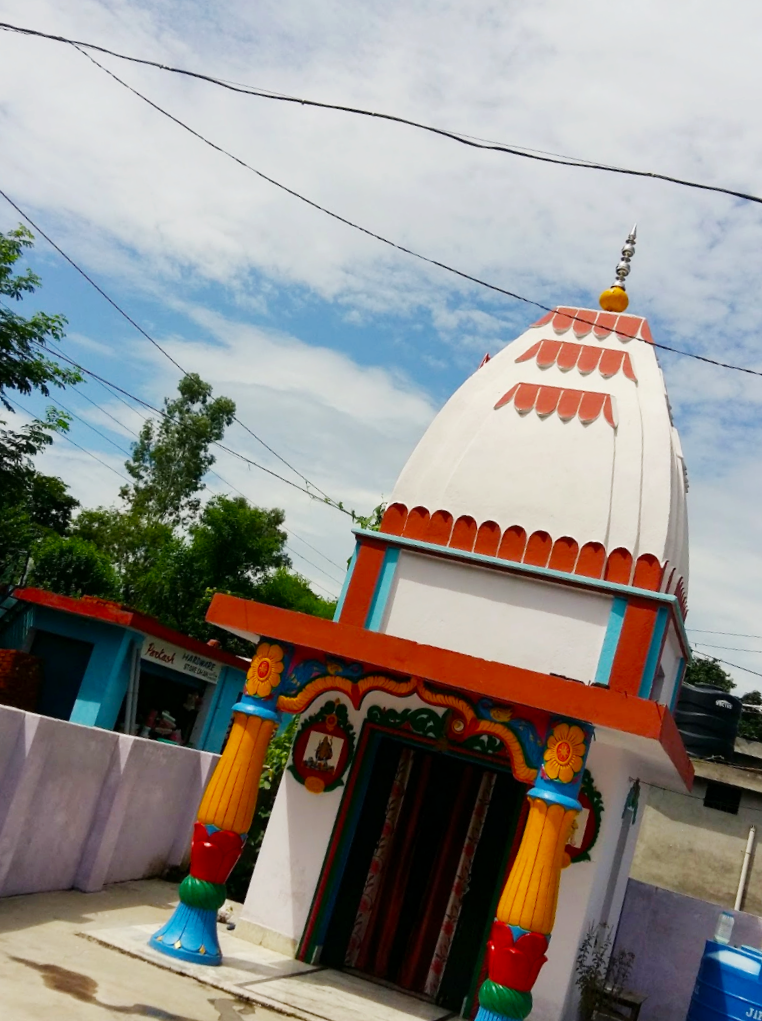
Vaishno Devi Mandir Jawali

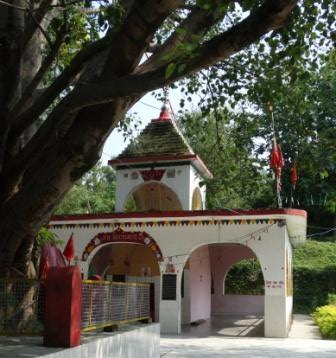
Mata Mansa Devi Mandir in Jawali(vikas jariyal)

== Transport ==
The closest airport to Jawali is Gaggal Airport (IATA: DHM, ICAO: VIGG) about 28.8 km / 17.9 miles and 37.2 km / 23.1 miles. The town can also be reached by Kangra Valley Railway line from Pathankot, 45 km (28 miles) away.

== List of all towns and Villages ==
#	Villages	Administrative Division	Population
1	Amlela Khas	Jawali	1,930
2	Amni	Jawali	303
3	Anuhi Khas	Jawali	626
4	Baded	Jawali	249
5	Badehla	Jawali	258
6	Badhin	Jawali	100
7	Bag	Jawali	713
8	Bagrur	Jawali	60
9	Bagwal	Jawali	823
10	Bahi	Jawali	220
11	Bajhera	Jawali	445
12	Bakan	Jawali	333
13	Balah	Jawali	1,608
14	Baldoa	Jawali	1,020
15	Baliara	Jawali	275
16	Balwar	Jawali	75
17	Ban Amlela	Jawali	163
18	Ban Tungli	Jawali	1,053
19	Banara	Jawali	402
20	Baneru	Jawali	181
21	Banoli Khas	Jawali	621
22	Basa	Jawali	128
23	Basa	Jawali	1,653
24	Basantpur	Jawali	336
25	Baskwara	Jawali	610
26	Batt	Jawali	629
27	Batuhi	Jawali	537
28	Beh	Jawali	89
29	Bhaglahr	Jawali	667
30	Bhalad	Jawali	516
31	Bhalowa	Jawali	26
32	Bhalun	Jawali	442
33	Bhalun	Jawali	406
34	Bhanai	Jawali	448
35	Bhaniari	Jawali	414
36	Bhareal	Jawali	507
37	Bharmar	Jawali	205
38	Bharnoli	Jawali	504
39	Bhathar	Jawali	371
40	Bhati	Jawali	90
41	Bhatoli	Jawali	380
42	Bhatoli	Jawali	378
43	Bhaunka	Jawali	565
44	Bhermar Khas	Jawali	2,958
45	Bhol	Jawali	359
46	Bhol Khas	Jawali	936
47	Bhurnala	Jawali	169
48	Bohrka	Jawali	973
49	Chabwan	Jawali	270
50	Chachian	Jawali	349
51	Chakarka	Jawali	62
52	Chakban	Jawali	15
53	Chakban	Jawali	41
54	Chakban	Jawali	183
55	Chalwara Khas	Jawali	3,223
56	Chandni	Jawali	502
57	Chanhiala	Jawali	252
58	Checher	Jawali	522
59	Chelian	Jawali	452
60	Chukhial	Jawali	95
61	Darkati	Jawali	927
62	Dasoli Jhikli	Jawali	474
63	Dasoli Upparli	Jawali	463
64	Dehri	Jawali	564
65	Dewal	Jawali	108
66	Dhan	Jawali	1,878
67	Dhar	Jawali	250
68	Dhar	Jawali	518
69	Dharun	Jawali	790
70	Dhewa	Jawali	654
71	Dhial	Jawali	699
72	Dhiala	Jawali	170
73	Dolba	Jawali	341
74	Dugli	Jawali	259
75	Duhngi	Jawali	547
76	Dul	Jawali	133
77	Dunihar	Jawali	32
78	Ghagher	Jawali	198
79	Ghar	Jawali	1,088
80	Ghar	Jawali	1,951
81	Ghar	Jawali	1,308
82	Ghar	Jawali	35
83	Gurah	Jawali	278
84	Har	Jawali	228
85	Har	Jawali	370
86	Harnaira	Jawali	48
87	Harnota	Jawali	465
88	Harnota Khas	Jawali	1,185
89	Harsar Khas	Jawali	1,667
90	Haryian	Jawali	483
91	Hawal	Jawali	470
92	Jaisar	Jawali	508
93	Janala	Jawali	42
94	Jangal Khas	Jawali	614
95	Jarot Khas	Jawali	2,327
96	Jarpal	Jawali	845
97	Jawali Khas	Jawali	3,087
98	Jhakri	Jawali	112
99	Jhalun	Jawali	244
100	Jhinjpur	Jawali	131
101	Jhirar	Jawali	456
102	Jhonka Ratial	Jawali	262
103	Jior Khas	Jawali	668
104	Jol	Jawali	639
105	Kakroh	Jawali	338
106	Kalahr	Jawali	282
107	Kaldun	Jawali	319
108	Kaniat	Jawali	712
109	Kardial	Jawali	1,058
110	Karsoli	Jawali	77
111	Katholi	Jawali	2,439
112	Katora	Jawali	1,757
113	Kehran Urf Bishanpura	Jawali	60
114	Khabal	Jawali	250
115	Khabbal	Jawali	773
116	Khairian	Jawali	2,123
117	Khairian	Jawali	300
118	Kharar	Jawali	162
119	Kharota	Jawali	763
120	Kimman	Jawali	154
121	Kohnal	Jawali	159
122	Kuthehr	Jawali	1,871
123	Kuthera	Jawali	495
124	Lab	Jawali	589
125	Ladhiar	Jawali	1,419
126	Laharn	Jawali	164
127	Lahri	Jawali	67
128	Lahru	Jawali	481
129	Lakhner	Jawali	115
130	Lalyad	Jawali	294
131	Latehr	Jawali	280
132	Lohar Beh	Jawali	40
133	Maira	Jawali	1,394
134	Makrahan	Jawali	805
135	Malela	Jawali	108
136	Manara	Jawali	216
137	Mandol	Jawali	367
138	Mangal	Jawali	146
139	Mast Garh	Jawali	267
140	Mawa	Jawali	459
141	Mehskar	Jawali	130
142	Muriana	Jawali	229
143	Mutlahr	Jawali	732
144	Nadoli Khas	Jawali	623
145	Nagrota Surian	Jawali	3,069
146	Nagrotu	Jawali	189
147	Naira Khas	Jawali	228
148	Nana Khas	Jawali	416
149	Nana Perla	Jawali	242
150	Nangial	Jawali	1,023
151	Nargala	Jawali	885
152	Narhan	Jawali	104
153	Narial	Jawali	143
154	Nawan Shahr	Jawali	220
155	Nial	Jawali	301
156	Padar	Jawali	508
157	Palaura Khas	Jawali	312
158	Panalath	Jawali	440
159	Panola	Jawali	55
160	Papahn	Jawali	1,076
161	Patan	Jawali	183
162	Pathiar	Jawali	421
163	Pharian	Jawali	914
164	Phiral	Jawali	116
165	Purkher	Jawali	566
166	Rajol	Jawali	379
167	Reserve Jangal Bar	Jawali	16
168	Reserve Jangal Dolba	Jawali	42
169	Sadhin	Jawali	123
170	Sahura	Jawali	266
171	Saknara	Jawali	1,552
172	Samkaher	Jawali	1,919
173	Samlana	Jawali	354
174	Sanehr	Jawali	319
175	Sarhohla	Jawali	105
176	Ser	Jawali	28
177	Sidhpur Ghad	Jawali	2,778
178	Sirhindi	Jawali	261
179	Sirmani Khas	Jawali	259
180	Siyuhni	Jawali	483
181	Solda	Jawali	527
182	Sowarka	Jawali	245
183	Spail	Jawali	1,091
184	Sudran	Jawali	679
185	Sughal	Jawali	849
186	Takhniar	Jawali	897
187	Talial	Jawali	430
188	Talian	Jawali	439
189	Thangar	Jawali	675
190	Thappal	Jawali	203
191	Tharoo	Jawali	478
192	Thehr	Jawali	199
193	Theru	Jawali	123
194	Tikkeri	Jawali	437
195	Tilok Nath	Jawali	926

== Nearby cities with distances ==
- Nurpur town, Himachal Pradesh -30 km
- Chandigarh – 240 km
- Palampur – 79 km
- Dhan – 2 km
- Joginder Nagar – 116 km
- Pathankot – 46 km
- Dharamshala – 52 km
- Dalhousie – 90 km
- Kangra – 50 km
- Nagrota Surian – 30 km
- Dehra – 65 km
- Shimla – 250 km
- Fatehpur (Vidhan Sabha constituency) – 15 km
