= Dhan, Himachal Pradesh =

Village in Jawali, Himachal Pradesh, India

Coordinates: 32.1319879°N 75.9903052°E

Dhan is a village in the tehsil of Jawali, Himachal Pradesh in India. As of the 2011 census, the village had a population of 1,878 persons in 399 households. The chief elected official is a Sarpanch.

== Temple ==
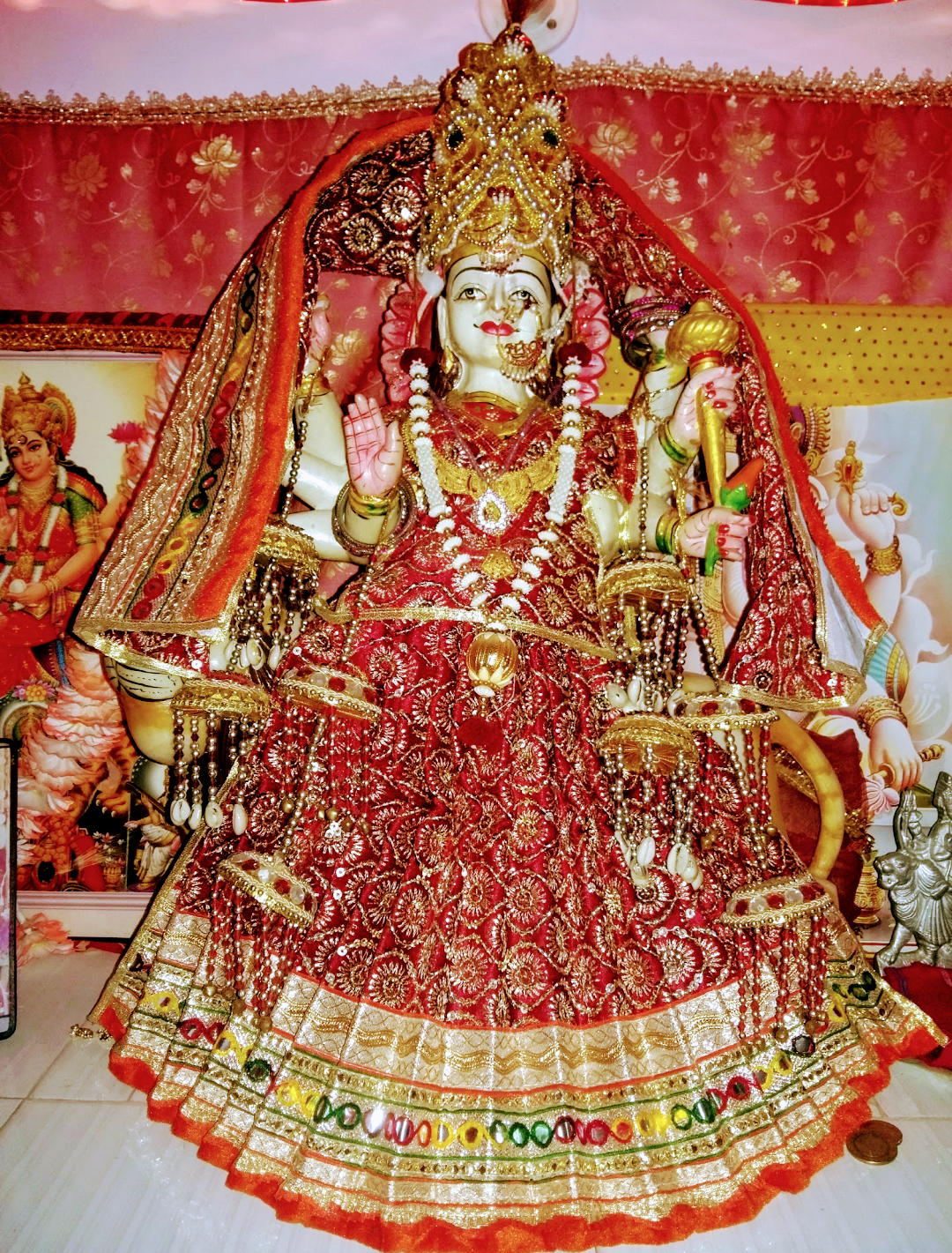
Vaishno Devi Mandir in Dhan

The Vaishno Devi Mandir is located in Dhan Village, approximately 2 kilometres from Jawali. The temple is established on 30 November 2012.
