= Pandoh Dam =

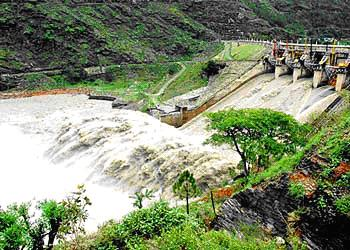

- Location within Himachal Pradesh Location within India
- Country: India
- Location: Mandi district
- Coordinates: 31°40′17″N 77°04′01″E
- Status: Operational
- Opening date: 1977
- Owner: Beas Construction Board

Dam and spillways
- Type of dam: Embankment
- Impounds: Beas River
- Height: 76 m (249 ft)
- Length: 255 m (837 ft)
- Dam volume: 1,580,000 m^{3} (2,066,562 yd^{3})
- Spillway capacity: 9,939 m^{3}/s (350,992 cu ft/s)

Reservoir
- Creates: Pandoh Lake
- Total capacity: 41,000,000 m^{3} (33,239 acre⋅ft)
- Surface area: 1.7 km^{2} (1 mi^{2})

Dehar Power Plant
- Coordinates: 31.41018°N 76.86205°E
- Commission date: 1977
- Hydraulic head: 335 m (1,099 ft)
- Turbines: 6 x 165 MW (221,000 hp) Francis-type
- Installed capacity: 990 MW (1,330,000 hp)

The Pandoh Dam is an embankment dam on the Beas River in Mandi district of Himachal Pradesh, India. Under the Beas Project, the dam was completed in 1977 and its primary purpose is hydroelectric power generation. Part of a run-of-the-river power scheme, it diverts the waters of the Beas to the southwest through a 38 km (24 mi) long system of tunnels and channels. The water is used for power generation at the Dehar Power House before being discharged into the Sutlej River, connecting both rivers. The power house has an installed capacity of 990 MW. The system diverts 256 cumecs (9000 cusecs) of Beas waters to the Satluj River. The project was completed in 1977.

== History ==
The two major rivers Beas and Satlej flow out of the himalayas and reach a point where they are separated by a crow fly distance of approximately 36 km and have an elevation difference of approximately 1099 ft. The waters of Beas flow from melting ice throughout the year. This was realized and a plan made to exploit the potential of this river system. The power potential was estimated as 1,000 MW. The plans originally called Beas Project Unit - I Beas Satluj Link Project went through several revisions for diverting the waters of Beas river. The first plan prepared by Punjab Irrigation Department in 1957. The 1957 plan contemplated a diversion dam at Pandoh, 11.26-kilometre (7.00 mi) tunnel, 19.31-kilometre (12.00 mi) open channel, 4.82-kilometre (3.00 mi) tunnel. The 1957 report was followed by a 1960 report and the final proposal in 1961. The final proposal included 76.25-metre (250.2 ft) diversion dam at Pandoh, a 7.62-metre (25.0 ft) dia, 13.11-kilometre (8.15 mi) Pandoh baggi tunnel, 11.8-kilometre (7.3 mi) Sunder Nagar hydel channel, 8.53-metre (28.0 ft) dia, 12.35-kilometre (7.67 mi) Sundernagar Satluj tunnel, 22.86-metre (75.0 ft) dia 125-metre (410 ft) high surge shaft, three Dehar penstocks split to six penstocks and Dehar power plant with 6 x 165 MW generators. The system would divert 9,000 cubic feet per second (250 m^{3}/s) of the Beas to the Satluj. An added benefit of the project was the increased inflow to Gobind Sagar thereby increasing power generation capacity at Bhakra Dam and added irrigation waters for the states of Punjab and Haryana. The project was approved in 1963 and commissioned in 1977.

== Components ==
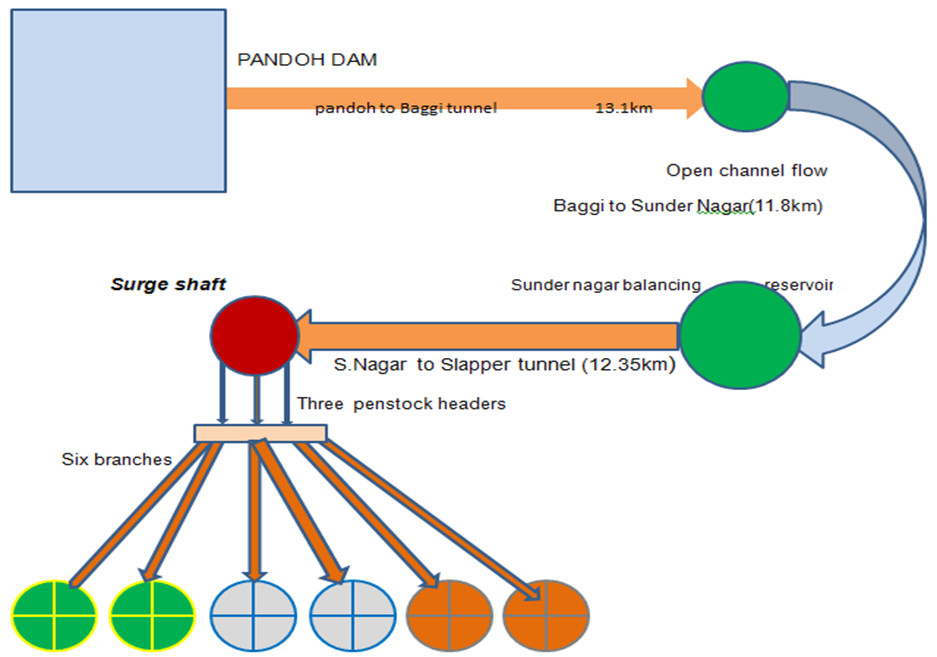

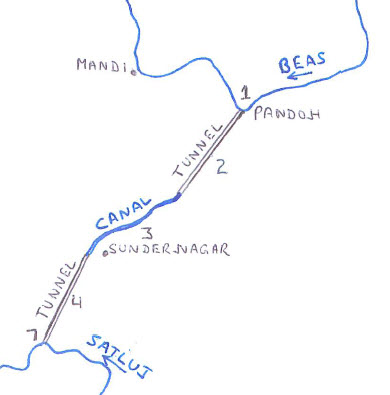
Plan View showing Beas and Satluj rivers; Pandoh dam, tunnels, hydel channel and power house

The seven components of the Dehar hydroelectric Project for diversion of 9000 cusecs of water and power generation as shown on the figures are:

1. Pandoh dam - 76.25 m (250 ft) earthen dam
2. Pandoh Baggi Tunnel - 7.62 m dia, 13.11 km long
3. Sundernagar Hydel Channel - 11.8 km long open channel
4. Sundarnagar Dehar Tunnel - 8.53 m dia, 12.53 km long
5. Surge Shaft - 22.86 m dia x 125 m high
6. Penstocks - Three 4.877 m split to six 3.353 m
7. Dehar Power House - 6 × 165 MW

== Pandoh Dam ==
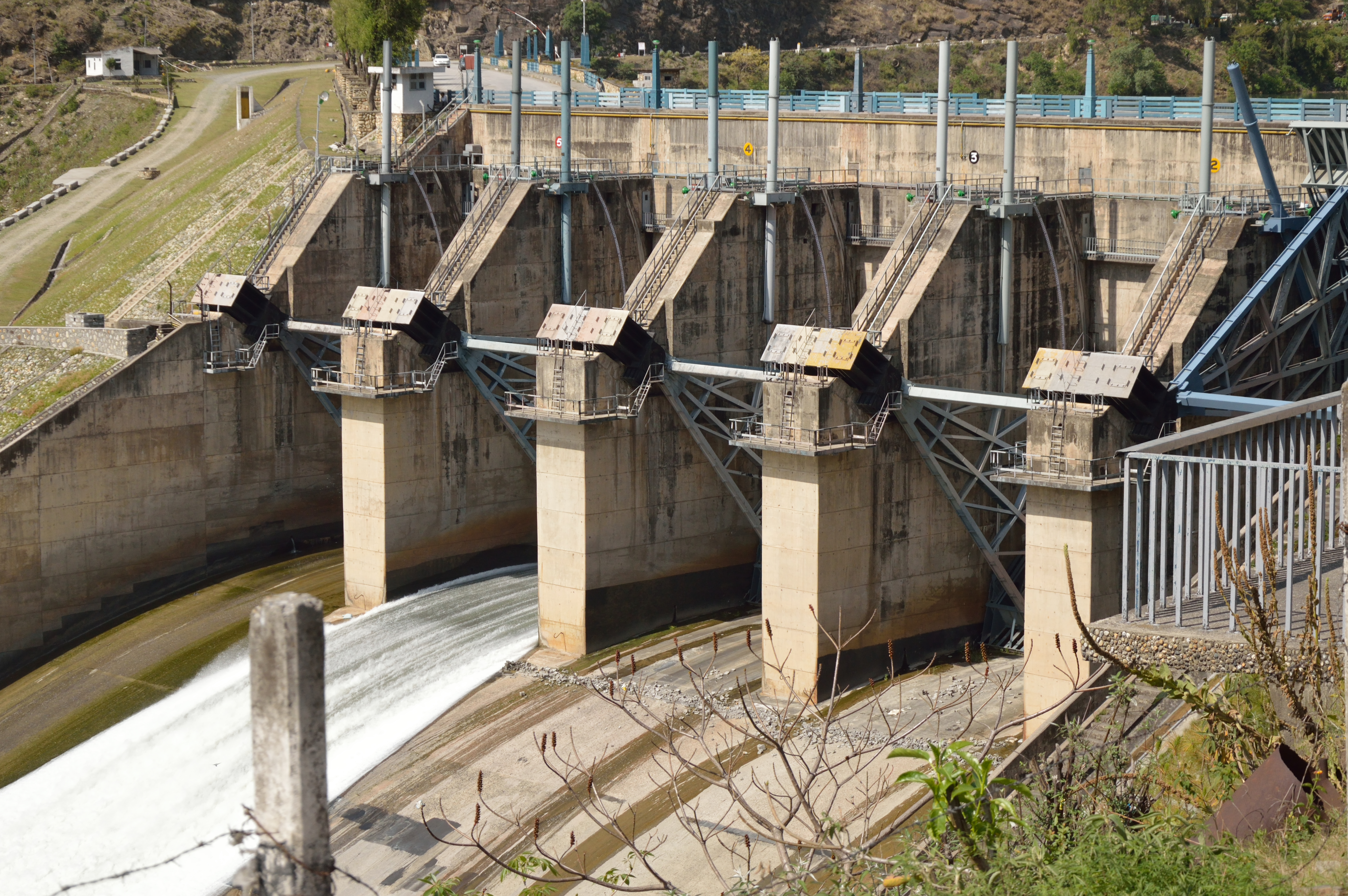
View of Pandoh Dam from NH-21

The 76 m (249 ft) tall Pandoh Dam is an embankment dam on the Beas River. The dam was commissioned in 1977 and its primary purpose is hydroelectric power generation. Part of a run-of-the-river power scheme, it diverts the waters of the Beas to the southwest through a 38 km (24 mi) long system of tunnels and channels. The water is used for power generation at the Dehar Power House before being discharged into the Satluj River, connecting both rivers.

== Pandoh Lake ==
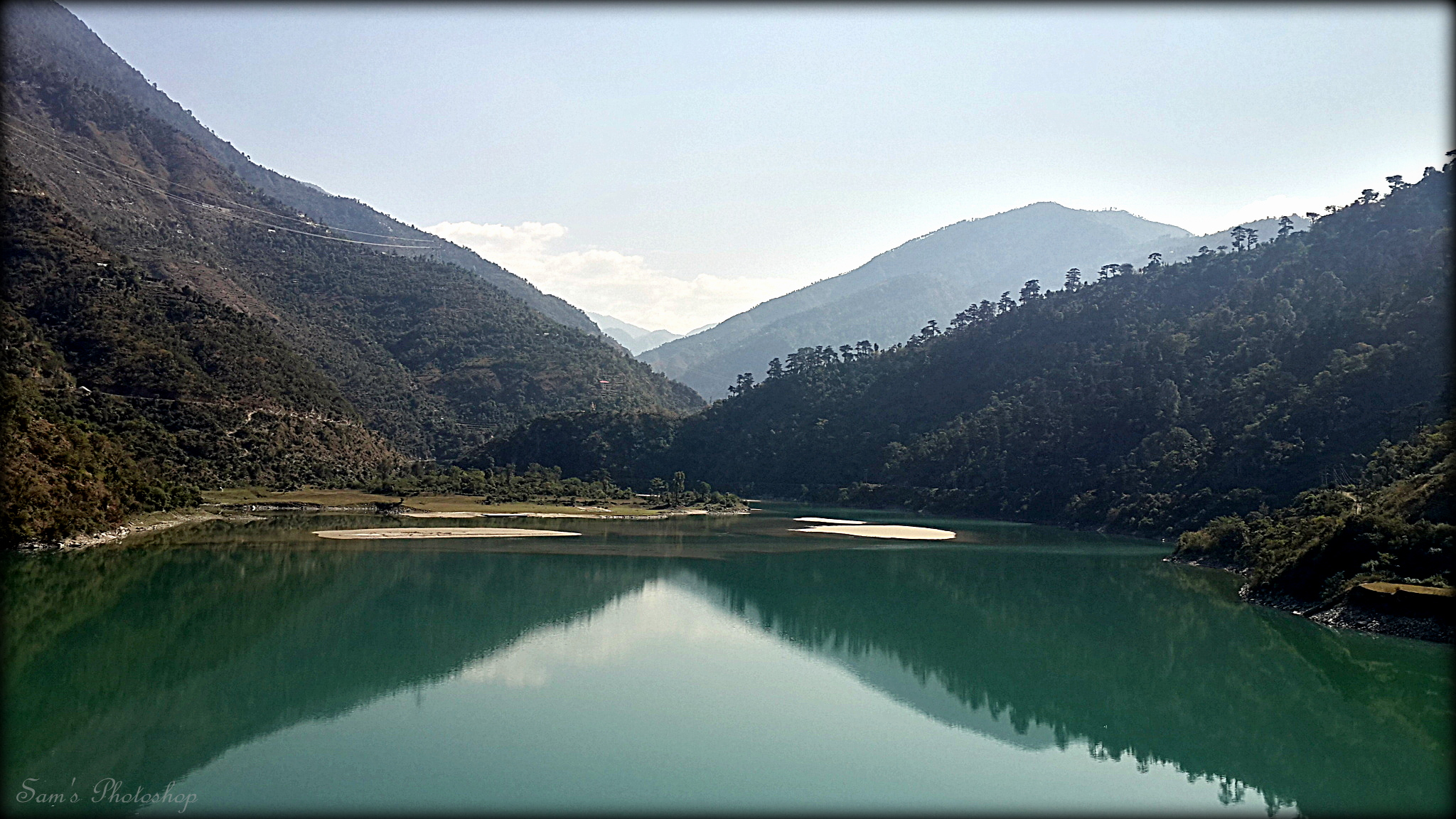
View of Pandoh Lake from Chandigarh-Manali NH-21

Pandoh Lake is created by Pandoh Dam and is located about 19 kilometres (12 mi) upstream from Mandi on the River Beas.

== Operation ==
Water diverted by the Pandoh Dam is first sent through the 7.62 m diameter, 13.1 km (8 mi) long Pandoh-Baggi tunnel which terminates at the beginning of a 11.8 km (7 mi) long channel. At the end of the channel, the water is stored at the Sundar Nagar Balancing Reservoir at 31°32′05″N 76°53′11″E. The reservoir has a live capacity of 3,700,000 m^{3} (3,000 acre⋅ft). From the balancing reservoir, water is again sent south through the 8.53 m dia, 12.38 km (8 mi) long Sundar Nagar Slapper tunnel. The tunnel ends just before the Dehar Power Plant at 31°24′47″N 76°52′06″E. It splits into three 4.877 m dia followed by six 3.353 m dia penstocks before reaching the power house. The 22.86 m dia 125 m tall surge shaft at the end of the tunnel is designed to take any backflow due to sudden shutdown of the power plant and avoid tunnel rupture due to water hammer.

== Dehar Power Plant ==
The Dehar Power Plant is situated on the banks of the Satluj at the Slapper bridge. Water from penstocks is fed into a six 165 MW Francis turbine-generator and then discharged in the Satluj. The power house has an installed capacity of 990 megawatts (1,330,000 hp). The change in elevation affords a hydraulic head of 335 m (1,099 ft).

It is managed by the Bhakra Beas Management Board (BBMB), which is engaged in regulation of the supply of water and power from Bhakra Nangal Dam and Beas Projects to the states of Punjab, Haryana, Rajasthan, Himachal Pradesh and Delhi.

Diverted waters from Beas also increased the generation capacity of the Bhakra Dam downstream of Dehar Power Plant.

Salient features
Turbine	Vertical shaft Francis turbine
Total no. of units	6
Capacity of each unit	165 MW
Total installed capacity	990 MW
Speed	300rpm
maximum head	341.4m
minimum head	254.6m
No of pen-stock headers	3
No of penstock branches	6

== Ecology ==
The Pandoh dam diverts 256 cumecs (9000 cusecs) of Beas to river Satluj. Diversion of the Beas water has done considerable damage to the towns downstream on Beas river and left a trail of misery to Mandi. In winter the river bed almost dries and leaves a deserted look.

== See also ==
- Pong Dam – located 140 km (87 mi) downstream, the second phase of the Beas Project in Kangra district
- Bhakra Dam – downstream of Dehar Power Station on Satluj river in Bilaspur district
- Nathpa Jhakri Dam - Dam on Satluj river in Rampur Bushahr in Shimla district
- Koldam Dam - Dam on Satluj river in Salaper in Bilaspur and Mandi districts
