= Pong Dam =

- Location within Himachal Pradesh Location within India
- Country: India
- Location: Khatiyar, Kangra district, Himachal Pradesh, India
- Coordinates: 31°58′17″N 75°56′48″E
- Status: Operational
- Construction began: 1961
- Opening date: 1974
- Owner: Bhakra Beas Management Board

Dam and spillways
- Type of dam: Embankment, earth-fill
- Impounds: Beas River
- Height: 133 m (436 ft)
- Length: 1,951 m (6,401 ft)
- Elevation at crest: 435.86 m (1,430 ft)
- Width (crest): 13.72 m (45 ft)
- Width (base): 610 m (2,001 ft)
- Dam volume: 35,500,000 m^{3} (46,432,247 cu yd)
- Spillways: 6 x radial gates
- Spillway type: Overflow gated chute
- Spillway capacity: 12,375 m^{3}/s (437,019 cu ft/s)

Reservoir
- Creates: Maharana Pratap Sagar
- Total capacity: 8,570,000,000 m^{3} (6,947,812 acre⋅ft) (302.69 tmc ft)
- Active capacity: 7,290,000,000 m^{3} (5,910,099 acre⋅ft) (257.48 tmc ft)
- Catchment area: 12,560 km^{2} (4,849 mi^{2})
- Surface area: 260 km^{2} (100 mi^{2})
- Maximum length: 41.8 km (26 mi)
- Normal elevation: 426.72 m (1,400 ft)

Power Station
- Commission date: 1978-1983
- Hydraulic head: 95.1 m (312 ft)
- Turbines: 6 x 66 MW Francis-type
- Installed capacity: 396 MW

The Pong Dam, also known as the Beas Dam, is an earth-fill embankment dam on the Beas River in Khatiyar, Kangra district in the state of Himachal Pradesh, India, just upstream of Talwara. The purpose of the dam is water storage for irrigation and hydroelectric power generation. As the second phase of the Beas Project, construction on the dam began in 1961 and was completed in 1974. At the time of its completion, the Pong Dam was the tallest of its type in India. The lake created by the dam, Maharana Pratap Sagar, became a renowned bird sanctuary.

== Background ==
The idea for a dam on the Beas at the Pong site was first proposed in 1926 and subsequent surveys of the Indus River and its tributaries were ordered by the Punjab Government in 1927. Interest in the dam declined after the report deemed the project difficult because of flood waters. In 1955, geological and hydrological studies were carried out on the Pong site and an embankment design was recommended. In 1959, extensive studies were carried out and recommended an embankment dam with a gravity section. A final design was issued and construction began in 1961 on the dam which was called Beas Project Unit II - Beas Dam. The Pandoh Dam 140 km (87 mi) upstream being the Beas Project Unit I. It was completed in 1974 and the power station was later commissioned between 1978 and 1983. About 150,000 people were displaced by the dam's large reservoir under a poorly planned and executed relocation program.

== Design ==
The Pong Dam is a 133 m (436 ft) tall and 1,951 m (6,401 ft) long earth-fill embankment dam with a gravel shell. It is 13.72 m (45 ft) wide at its crest and 610 m (2,001 ft) wide at its base. The total volume of the dam is 35,500,000 m^{3} (46,432,247 cu yd) and its crest sits at an elevation of 435.86 m (1,430 ft) above sea level. The dam's spillway is located on its southern bank and is a chute-type controlled by six radial gates. Its maximum discharge capacity is 12,375 m^{3}/s (437,019 cu ft/s). The reservoir created by the dam, Maharana Pratap Sagar, has a gross capacity of 8,570,000,000 m^{3} (6,947,812 acre⋅ft) of which 7,290,000,000 m^{3} (5,910,099 acre⋅ft) is active (live) capacity. The reservoir has a normal elevation of 426.72 m (1,400 ft) and catchment area of 12,560 km^{2} (4,849 mi^{2}). The reservoir reaches from the dam to 41.8 km (26 mi) upstream in length and covers a surface of 260 km^{2} (100 mi^{2}). Located at the base of the dam is its power house. It is supplied with water via three penstocks which each meet a 66 MW Francis turbine-generator located inside the Bhatoli phakorian. The dam's elevation to the power house provides a maximum of 95.1 m (312 ft) in hydraulic head.

== Displacement of people ==
The large reservoir created by this dam resulted in a major displacement of people from the state of Himachal Pradesh. A total of 90,702 people were displaced and 339 villages affected. The displaced people were to be resettled in Rajasthan. However, as of February 2014, 9732 requests for land allotment were still pending. Himachal Pradesh threatened Rajasthan that they will file a contempt of court in Supreme Court if land is not allotted.

== See also ==
- Bhakra Dam
- Pandoh Dam
- Koldam Dam
- Nathpa Jhakri Dam
- Karcham Wangtoo Hydroelectric Project
