= Bathu Temples =

- बाथू की लड़ी
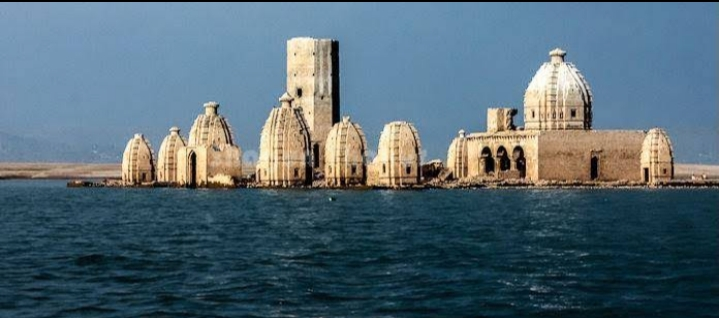
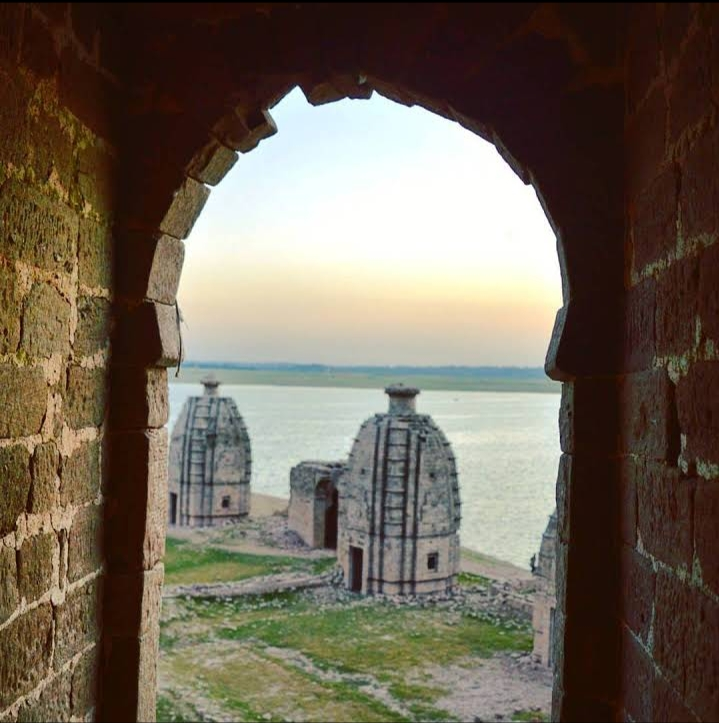
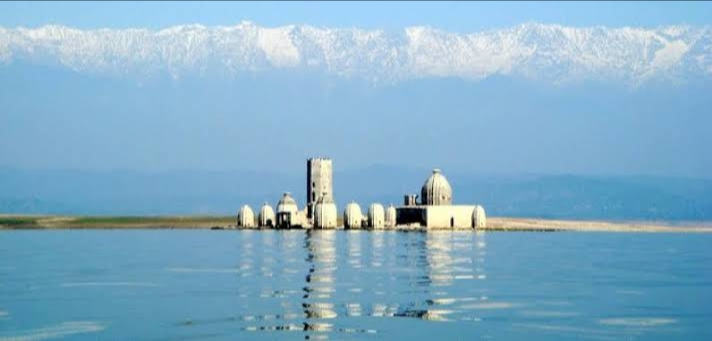
- Clockwise from top right: Temples from Maharana Pratap Sagar, Nagara styled architecture, Temples with Himalayas in the background.

- Location in Himachal Pradesh

Religion
- Affiliation: Hinduism
- District: Kangra
- Deity: Shiva, Parvati

Location
- Location: Maharana Pratap Sagar
- State: Himachal Pradesh
- Country: India
- Coordinates: 32.047235°N 76.003648°E

Architecture
- Type: Nagara architecture
- Creator: Pandavas

Bathu temples (बाथू मंदिर), known locally as Bathu ki ladi (बाथू की लड़ी), is a cluster of temples in the Kangra district of Indian state of Himachal Pradesh, with the main temple dedicated to Parvati and Shiva. These temples were submerged in Maharana Pratap Sagar, a reservoir created by Pong dam in the early 1970s. Since then, these temples are only accessible from May to June when the water level decreases.

== History ==
Per the local folklore legends, the Bathu cluster of temples were built by the Pandavas when they were travelling through the area during their period of exile. The Pandavas attempted to build a staircase to connect with the Masrur rock temples in one night but the construction was abandoned midway. The half-constructed stairway consisting of forty stairs can still be seen there and it is accessible to the public.

It is believed that the Pandavas had built eleven temples, out of which two were destroyed with time and nine remains. Parallel historical records suggest that the temples were built in 8th century AD by the Hindu Shahi dynasty. The central temple is considered to be dedicated to Shiva while some believe it is dedicated to Vishnu.

== Architecture ==
The Bathu temples are built in the Nagara style architecture, which is common in the state of Himachal Pradesh. The temples are built with bathu stones; despite being submerged for 8 months every year, there has been minimal damage to the temples. The stones bear the iconography of Kali and Ganesha, and there is Vishnu reclining on Sheshnag inside the temple. No priests are available at the temples; devotees worship on their own.

There are several small villages near the temple site, which includes Guglara, Sugnara, Harsar, Jarot, Bajera, Katnor, Khabal, Ludret, and Bhial.

== Preservation ==
When the area was acquired in the 1970s for the creation of the Pong dam reservoir, the then government had committed to build a new temple structure at Bainan Attarian and relocate the temple idols. However, this has not yet happened. Conservationists have been trying to protect the Bathu temples. In 2022, the Archaeological Survey of India (ASI) was contacted by the Indian National Trust for Art and Cultural Heritage (INTACH) with the request to relocate the ancient Bathu temples.

== Gallery ==
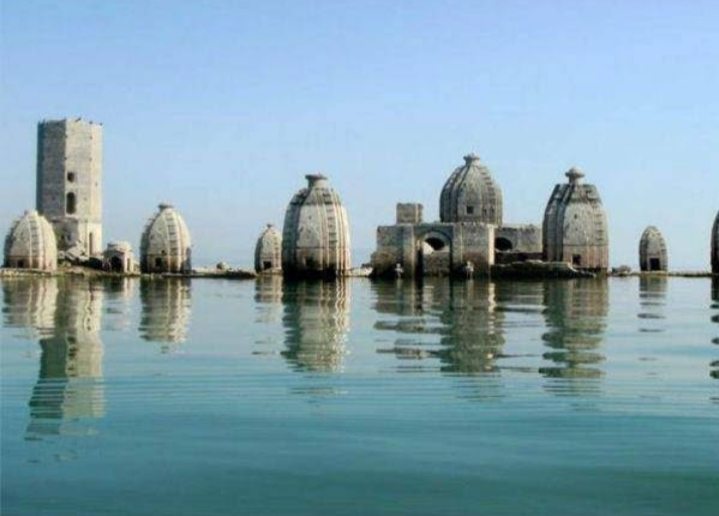

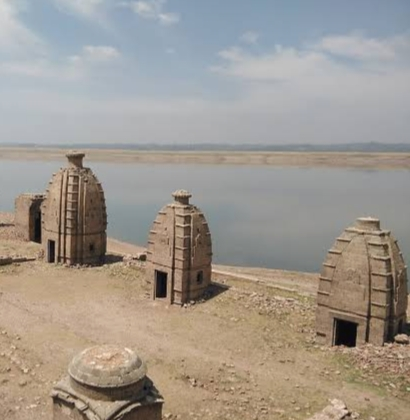

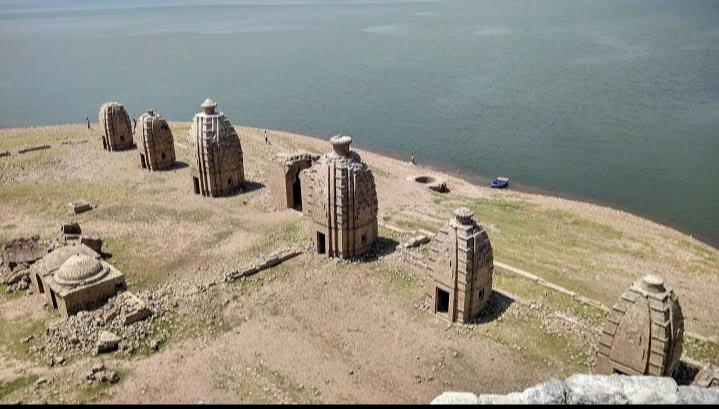

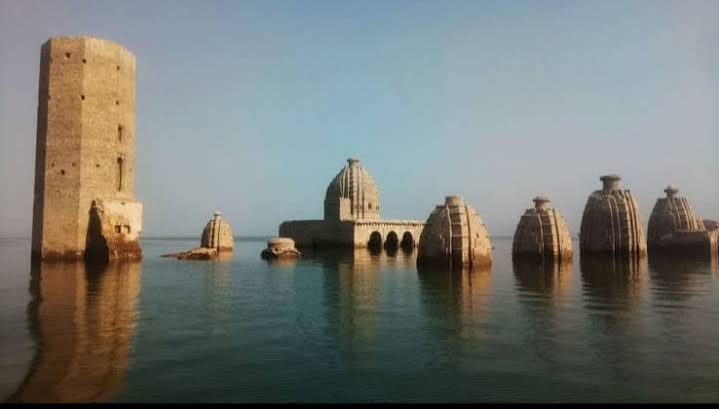

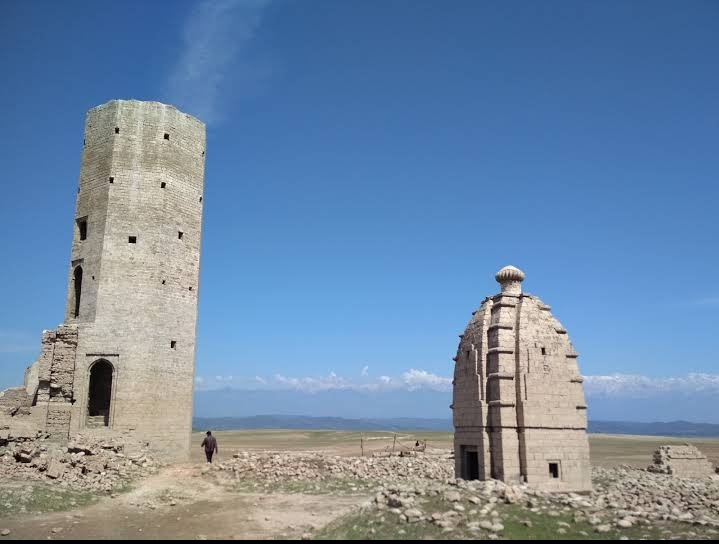

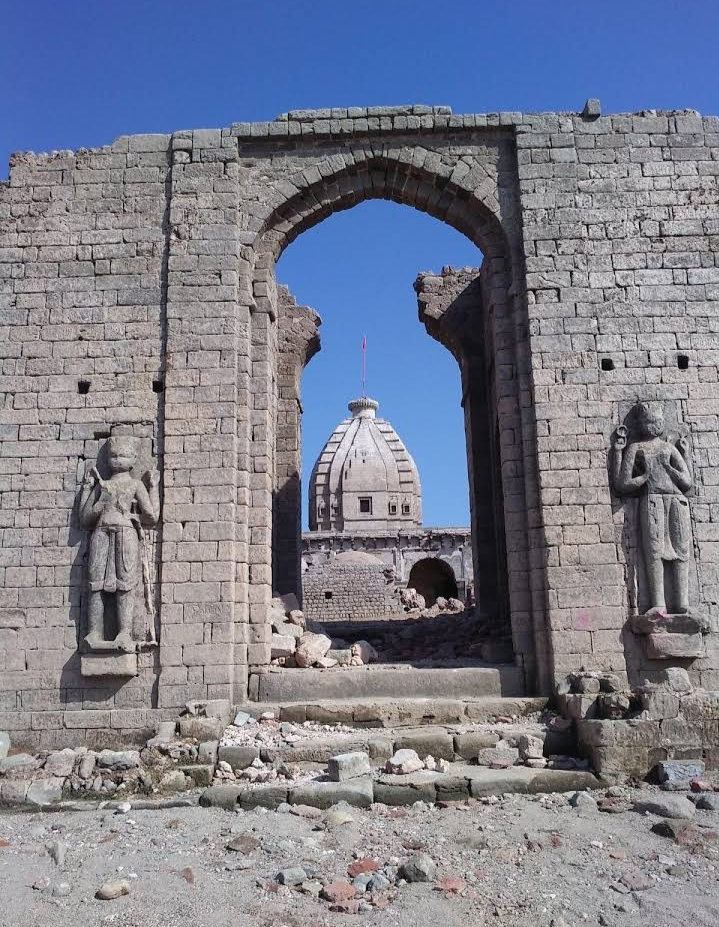

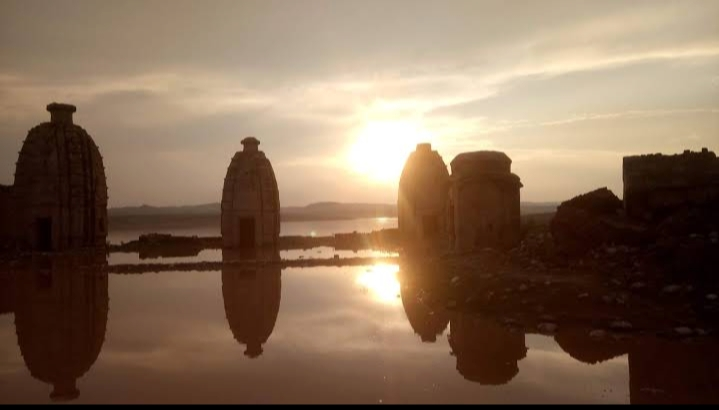

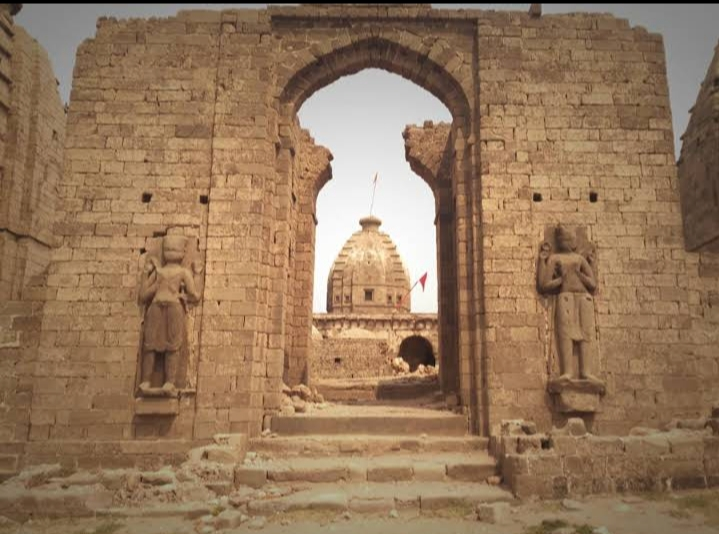

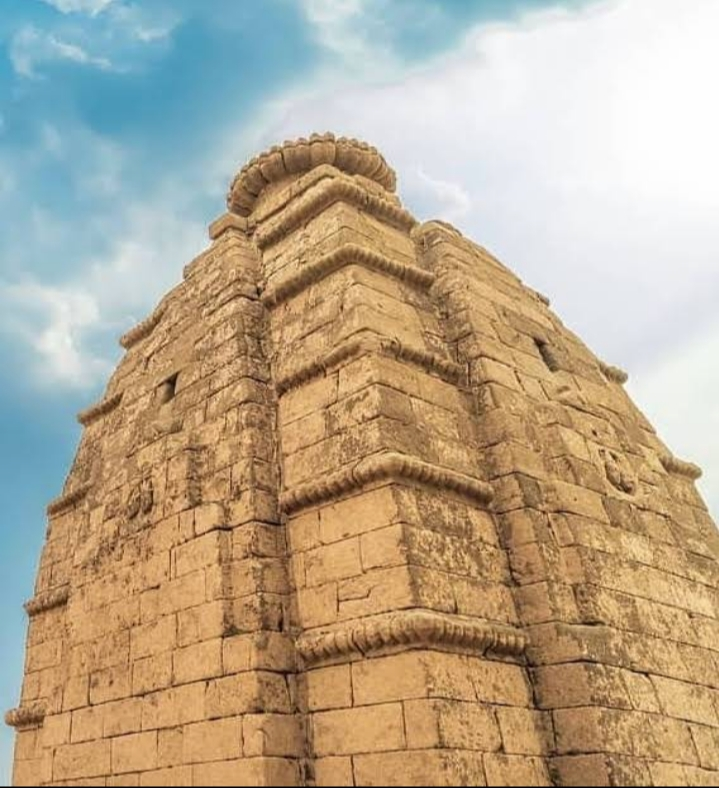

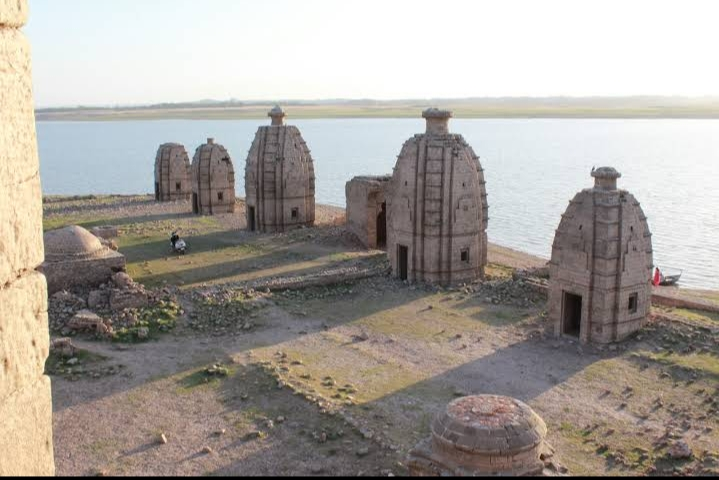

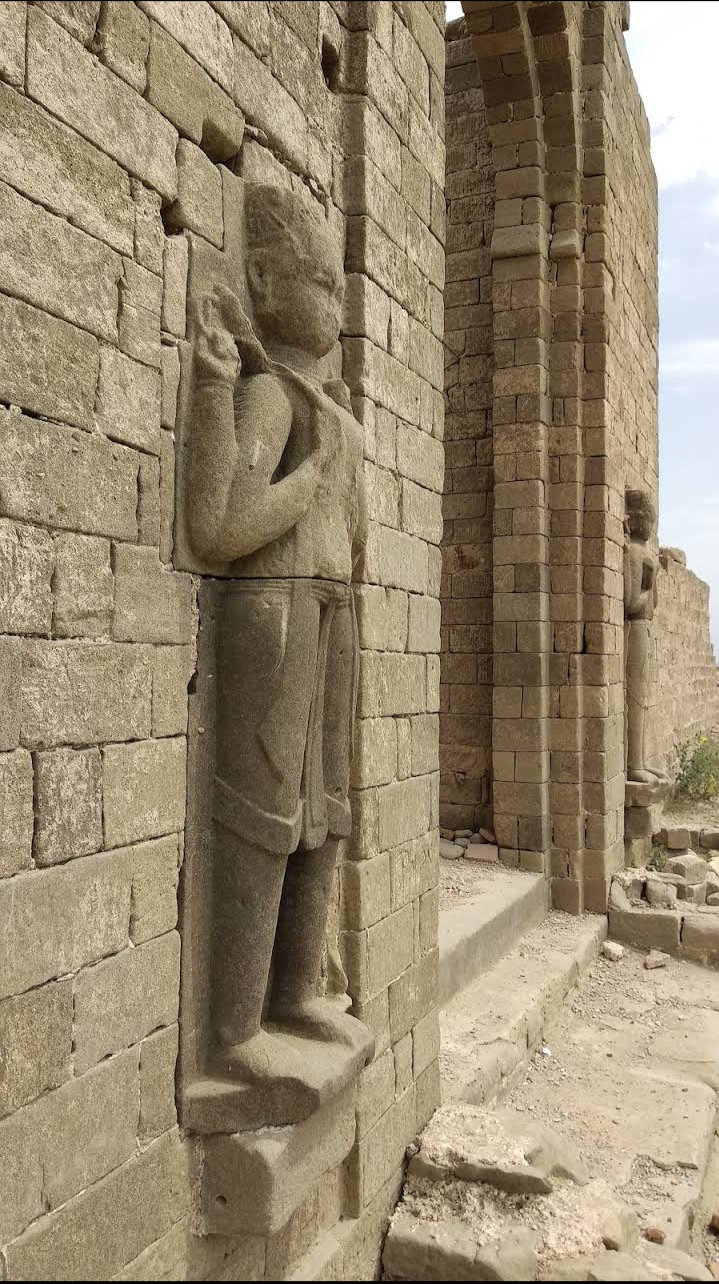

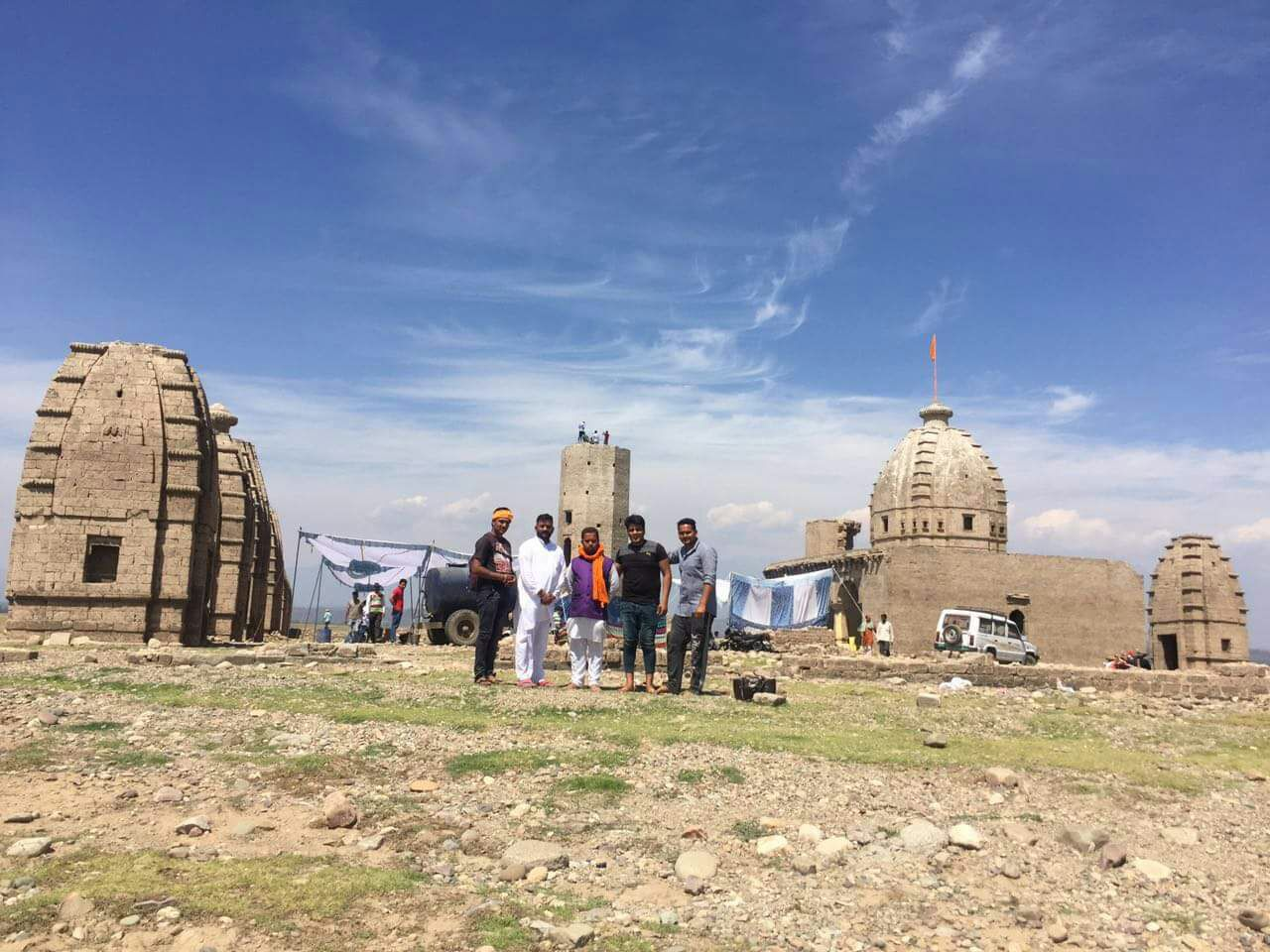
