= Talwara =

- City
- Location in Punjab, India
- Coordinates: 31.90°N 75.65°E
- Country: India
- State: Punjab
- District: Hoshiarpur

Government
  - Type: Nagar Panchayat
  - Body: Nagar Panchayat Talwara

Area
  - Total: 10 km^{2} (3.9 sq mi)
- Elevation: 326 m (1,070 ft)

Population (2011)
  - Total: 19,485
  - Density: 1,900/km^{2} (5,000/sq mi)

Languages
  - Official: Hindi
  - Native: Punjabi, Pahari
- Time zone: UTC+5:30 (IST)
- PIN: 144216
- Telephone code: 01883
- Vehicle registration: PB-54

Talwara is a city, just 58 km from Hoshiarpur city in Hoshiarpur district in the Indian state of Punjab. It is at the border of the state of Himachal Pradesh.This place is known for proximity to Pong Dam in Kangra district of Himachal Pradesh and was mainly populated during the construction of the same. It is situated on the banks of Pong Left Main Canal locally known as Shah Neher. It consists of 4 sectors and a main market, where people can get their day-to-day needs.

== Geography ==
Talwara is located at 31.95°N 75.87°E. It has an average elevation of 326 metres (1069 ft).

Talwara Township generally known as Talwara is named after a small nearby village name Talwara. It is approximately 75 km from district headquarter Hoshiarpur City and 28 km from the Mukerian City. It is situated about 22 km from the Hindu temple of Mata Chinta-Poorni darbar (in Himanchal Pradesh). It is a town located at the fringes of Shivalik range of mountains. The Pong Dam (the Beas Dam) is only 15 km from here in Kangra district of Himachal Pradesh.

== Demographics ==
As of 2001 India census, Talwara had a population of 22,580. Males constitute 53% of the population and females 47%. Talwara has an average literacy rate of 80%, higher than the national average of 59.5%: male literacy is 83%, and female literacy is 76%. In Talwara, 11% of the population is under 6 years of age.
