= Koldam Dam =

Koldam
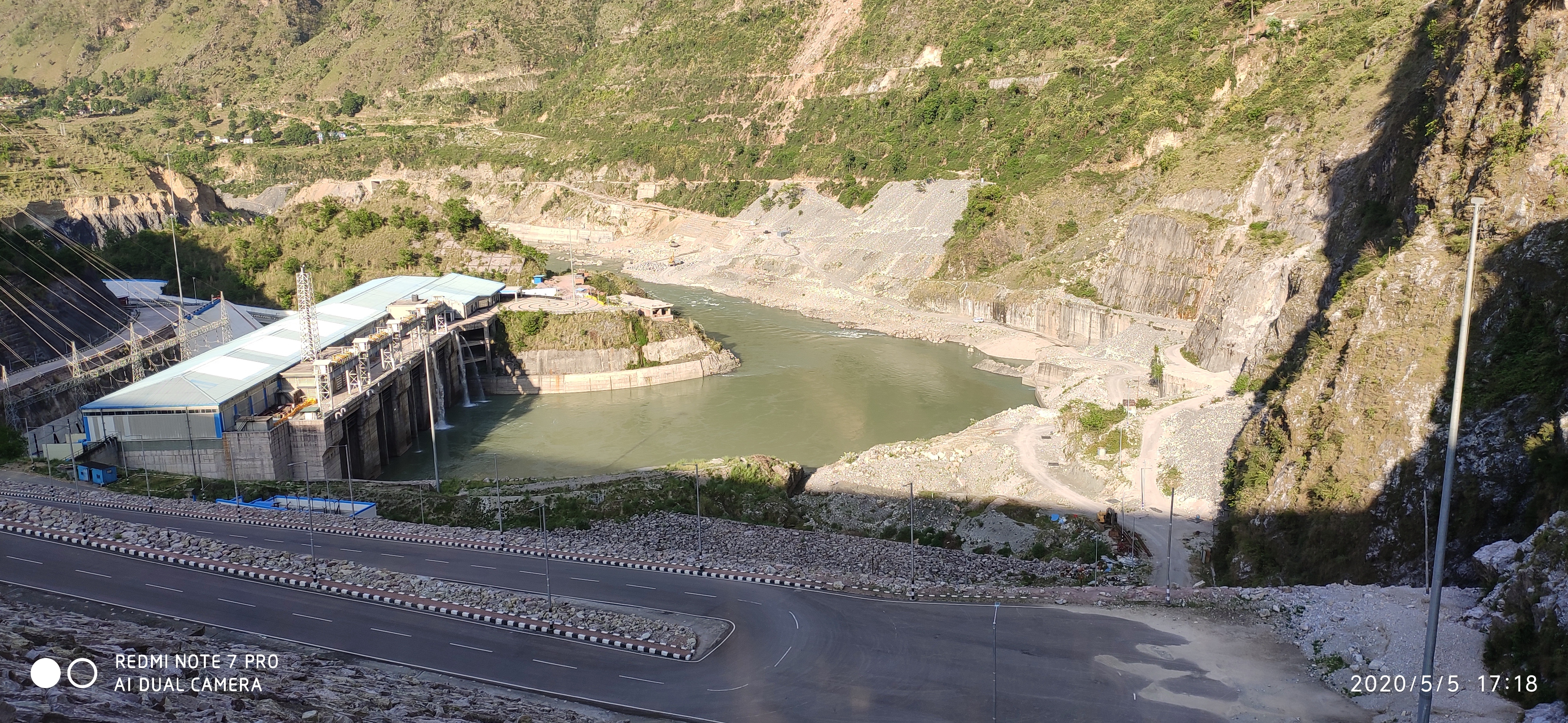
- A rendition of the dam power station

- Location within India
- Official name: Koldam Hydro Power Station
- Country: India
- Location: Salaper, Bilaspur district and Mandi district, Himachal Pradesh, India
- Coordinates: 31°22′59″N 76°52′16″E
- Status: Operational
- Construction began: 2004
- Opening date: 2015
- Owner: NTPC Limited

Dam and spillways
- Type of dam: Embankment, rock-fill with clay core
- Impounds: Sutlej
- Height (foundation): 167 m (548 ft)
- Height (thalweg): 153 m (502 ft)
- Length: 474 m (1,555 ft)
- Elevation at crest: 648 m (2,126 ft)
- Width (crest): 14 m (46 ft)
- Width (base): 768.97 m (2,522.9 ft)
- Dam volume: 12,000,000 m^{3} (15,695,407 cu yd)
- Spillway type: Chute with flip bucket, six radial gates
- Spillway capacity: 16,500 m^{3}/s (582,692 cu ft/s)

Reservoir
- Total capacity: 576,000,000 m^{3} (466,971 acre⋅ft)
- Active capacity: 90 MCM
- Inactive capacity: 486 MCM
- Catchment area: 53770 Sq Km
- Surface area: 12.5 Sq Km
- Maximum length: 40 km (25 mi)
- Normal elevation: 642 m (2,106 ft)

Power Station
- Commission date: 2015
- Hydraulic head: 131.2 m (430 ft) (static)
- Turbines: 4 x 200 MW Francis-type
- Installed capacity: 800 MW
- Capacity factor: 43.58
- Annual generation: 3055 million units (3055 GWh)

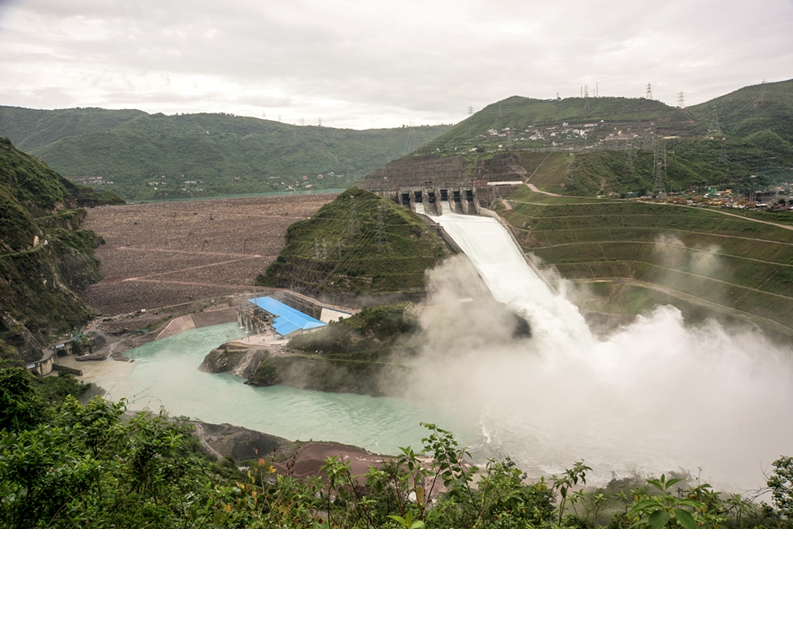

The Koldam Hydropower Station, commonly known as Koldam, is an embankment dam on the Sutlej River upstream of the Dehar Power House. It is situated in Salaper, between two districts Bilaspur and Mandi, 18 km from Bilaspur off the Chandigarh-Manali Highway (NH-21) near Barmana, Himachal Pradesh, India. The main purpose of the dam is hydroelectric power generation and it will support an 800 MW power station. The dam was constructed by NTPC Limited (erstwhile National Thermal Power Corporation Limited).

Koldam project was first conceived in mid‐sixties and investigations on various possible sites had been in progress since 1966. Based on investigation carried out until 1975, a project report was prepared which envisaged construction of rockfill dam having an installed capacity of 600 MW. The work of investigation and studies was taken by HPSEB in October, 1984. The project capacity was revised to 800 MW, but work did not start for lack of funds. Subsequently, Koldam Hydro Project was taken over by NTPC in 2000 and Project Report was revised with a 167m high rock fill dam and Surface Power House located at toe of the dam with installed capacity of 4X200 MW.

The foundation stone for the dam was laid on 5 June 2000 by Prime Minister Atal Bihari Vajpayee. On 14 January 2004, main construction on the dam began. KB Dubey was the first Head of the Project (BUH) . The current BUH is NS Thakur (since 2020).

Due to problems associated with geological issues and declaration of part of reservoir area in 2006 as extension of Majathal Wildlife Sanctuary, the project got delayed. Attempts to impound the reservoir first failed in December 2013 due to problems with sealing the diversion tunnels. By 18 March 2014, a fourth attempt to seal the tunnels and fill the lake was underway. Repairs were made and another unsuccessful impounding was reached in April 2014 as the diversion tunnel continued to leak. Another period of impounding began on 3 November 2014 and finished on 3 January 2015. A tunnel still leaked though but authorities were confident they would have the power station operational by April. Generator commissioning was originally scheduled for 2009 but was rescheduled to 2015.

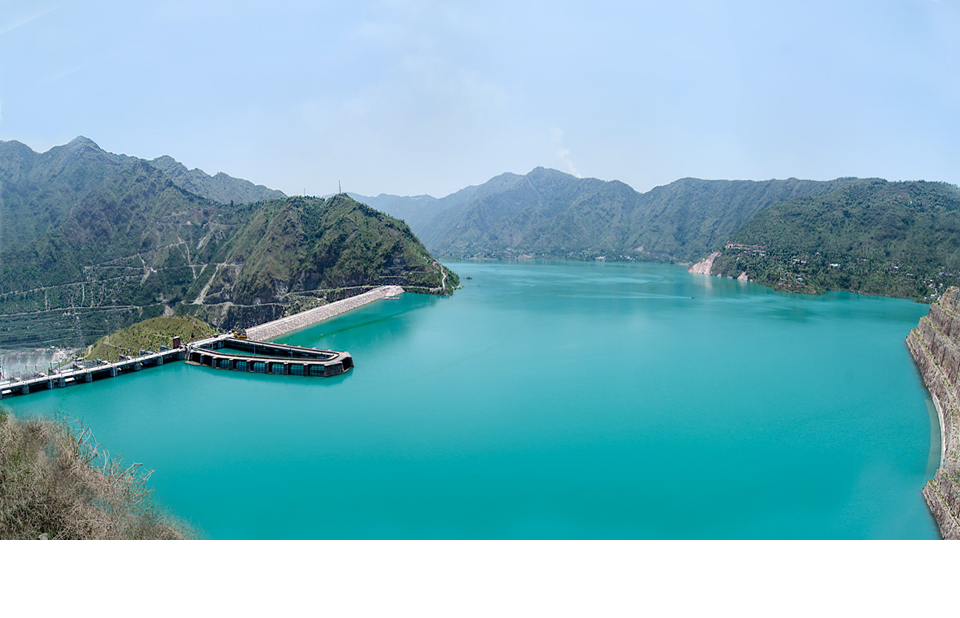

== Construction ==
The contract of construction of dam was awarded to Thailand's ITD Public Company Limited. A joint venture company of BHEL, Toshiba and Marubeni supplied turbines and generators.

== Power generation capacity ==
Its installed capacity is of 800 MW (4x200 MW). The first 200 MW Francis turbine-generator was commissioned on 30 March 2015 and the third on 10 April 2015.

Unit number	Capacity (MW)	Date of commissioning	Status
1	200	31 March 2015	commissioned.
2	200	30 March 2015	commissioned
3	200	10 April 2015	commissioned
4	200	12 June 2015	commissioned
TOTAL	800		

== See also ==
- Bhakra Dam – located downstream
- Pandoh Dam
- Nathpa Jhakri Dam
- Dams on Sutlej
- Rivers of Jammu and Kashmir
