= Nagrota Surian =

- Village
- Location within Himachal Pradesh Location within India
- Coordinates: 32.055°N 76.090°E
- Country: India
- State: Himachal Pradesh
- District: Kangra

Government
  - Type: Nagar Panchayat
- Elevation: 455 m (1,493 ft)

Languages
  - Official: Hindi
  - Regional: Pahari
- Time zone: UTC+5:30 (IST)
- Postal code: 176027

Nagrota Surian is a town in Nagrota Surian Mandal, Kangra District, in the Indian state of Himachal Pradesh. Nagrota Surian is 45.2 km from the district headquarters Dharamshala. It is about 260 km from the state capital Shimla. Block Head office is also available in Nagrota surian.

== Nearest towns ==
Nearby villages include Teen botu, Suknara(2.5km), Balora, Katholi, Ludret(4 km), Barial(5 km), Bhial(6 km), Nandpur, Ghera, Sakri, Bilaspur, Guler, Basa, Spail, Galua, Bantungli, Ghar Jarot, Jarpal, Baldoa Pargod Temple(1.1 km) Dhewa (2.1 km), Amlela (10 km), Khabbal (2 km), Jarot (2.2 km), and Katora (2.3 km). Nearest towns are Nagrota Surian (0 km), Jawali, Lunj, Masrrur Temple (7 km), Dehra Gopipur (28 km) and Kangra.

== Places of interest ==
This town is located near the Pong Lake. The Pong Dam Reservoir is very much approachable from Nagrota Surian, which is the main attraction due to migratory birds during various seasons. This reservoir comes under the Ramsar Wetland sites and rancer a small island between pong dam, approachable by boat. It is the home of some local wild animals and has a pathway circling full island and offers great view of the dam.

== Transportation to Nagarota Surian ==
The nearest airport is Kangra Airport in Gaggal, 36 km away. Bus service is available from Nurpur (60 km) from Dehradun (28 km), from Kangra (44 km), from Dharamshala (45 km) and Palampur (68 km). The town has a railway station on narrow gauge b/w Pathankot to Jogindernagar.
