= Masrur Temples =

8th-century rock cut stone temple and ruins in Himachal Pradesh

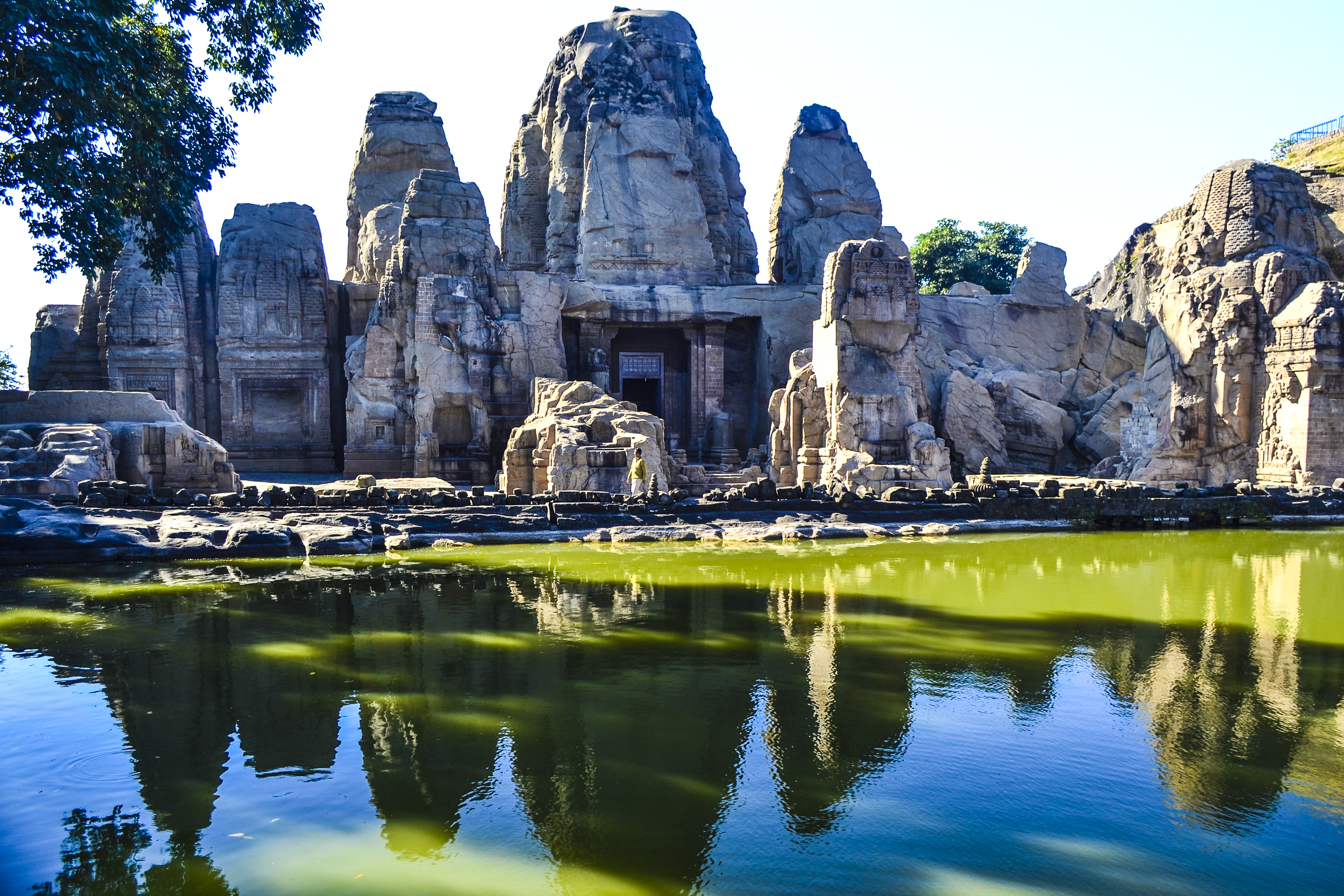
- Rock-cut Hindu temples of Masrur

- Location within India Location within Himachal Pradesh

Religion
- Affiliation: Hinduism
- District: Kangra district
- Deity: Shiva, Vishnu, Devi, others

Location
- Location: Othra, Beas River Valley
- State: Himachal Pradesh
- Country: India
- Interactive map of Masrur Temples
- Coordinates: 32°04′21.2″N 76°08′13.5″E

Architecture
- Style: Nagara
- Completed: 8th-century

The Masrur Temples, also referred to as Masroor Temples or Rock-cut Temples at Masrur, is an early 8th-century complex of rock-cut Hindu temples in the Kangra Valley of Beas River in Himachal Pradesh, India. The temples face northeast, towards the Dhauladhar range of the Himalayas. They are a version of North Indian Nagara architecture style, dedicated to Shiva, Vishnu, Devi and Saura traditions of Hinduism, with its surviving iconography likely inspired by a henotheistic framework.

Though a major temple complex in the surviving form, the archaeological studies suggest that the artists and architects had a far more ambitious plan and the complex remains incomplete. Much of the Masrur's temple's sculpture and reliefs have been lost. They were also quite damaged, most likely from earthquakes.

The temples were carved out of monolithic rock with a shikhara, and provided with a sacred pool of water as recommended by Hindu texts on temple architecture. The temple has three entrances on its northeast, southeast and northwest side, two of which are incomplete. Evidence suggests that a fourth entrance was planned and started but left mostly incomplete, something acknowledged by the early 20th-century colonial era archaeology teams but ignored leading to misidentification and erroneous reports. The entire complex is symmetrically laid out on a square grid, where the main temple is surrounded by smaller temples in a mandala pattern. The main sanctum of the temples complex has a square plan, as do other shrines and the mandapa. The temples complex features reliefs of major Vedic and Puranic gods and goddesses, and its friezes narrate legends from the Hindu texts.

The temple complex was first reported by Henry Shuttleworth in 1913 bringing it to the attention of archaeologists. They were independently surveyed by Harold Hargreaves of the Archaeological Survey of India in 1915. According to Michael Meister, an art historian and a professor specializing in Indian temple architecture, the Masrur temples are a surviving example of a temple mountain-style Hindu architecture which embodies the earth and mountains around it.

== Location ==
The Masrur Temples are about 45 kilometres (28 mi) southwest of the Dharamshala-McLeod Ganj and 35 kilometres (22 mi) west from the Kangra town in the mountainous state of Himachal Pradesh in north India. The temple is built in the Beas River valley, in the foothills of the Himalayas, facing the snowy peaks of the Dhauladhar range. The temples are about 225 kilometres (140 mi) northwest from Shimla, about 150 kilometres (93 mi) north of Jalandhar and about 85 kilometres (53 mi) east of Pathankot. The nearest railway station is Nagrota Surian, and the nearest airport is Dharamshala(IATA: DHM). The closest major airports with daily services are Amritsar and Jammu.

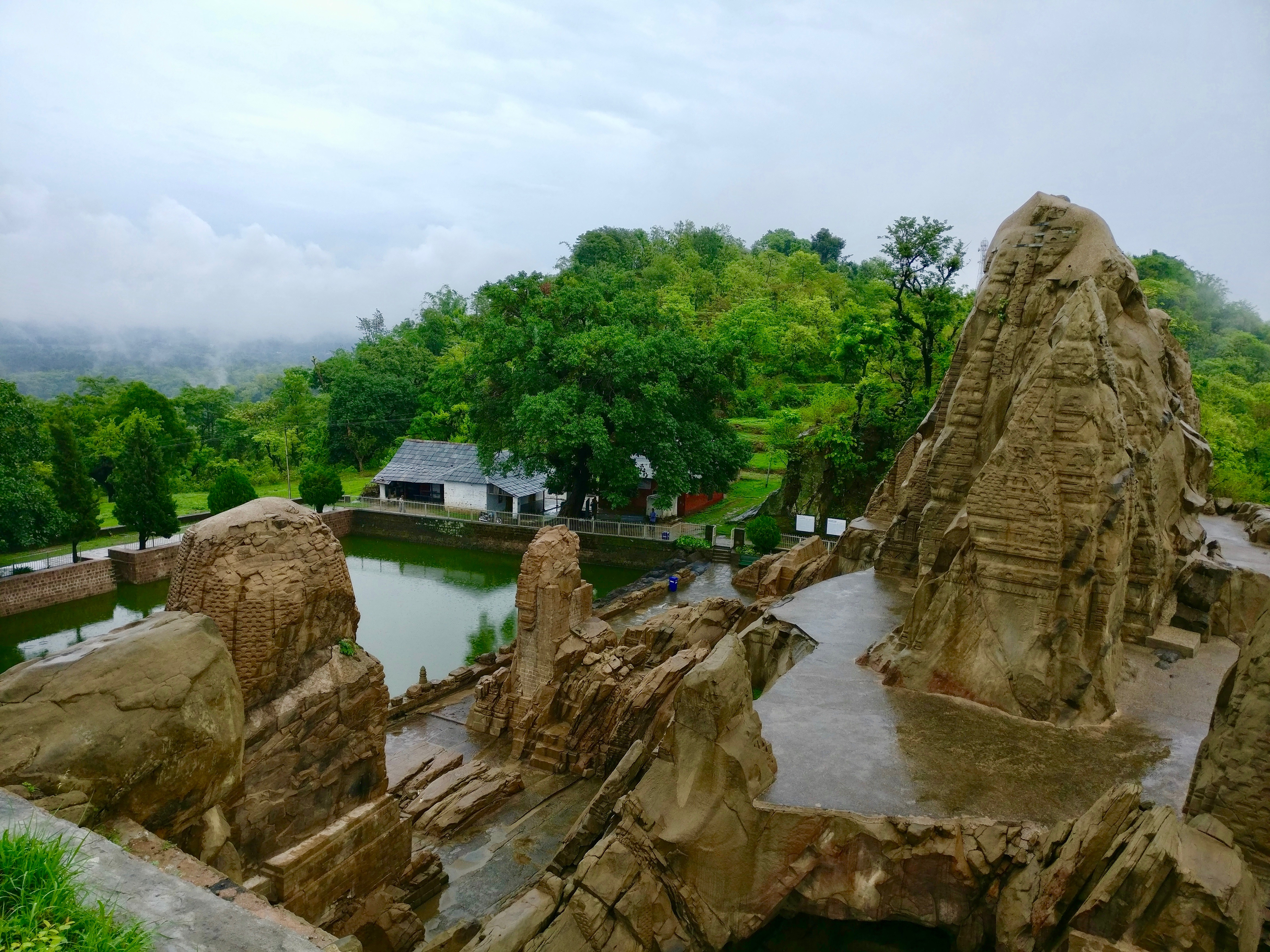
The temple is located in the Himalayan foothills. Above: the damaged structure with sacred pool in the front.

The rock-cut temple is located in the valley, on the top of a naturally rocky hill, which Hargreaves in 1915 described as, "standing some 2,500 feet above sea level, and commanding, as they [Hindu temples] do, a magnificent view over a beautiful, well-watered and fertile tract, their situation, though remote, is singularly pleasing".

== Date ==
The Hindu temples in Masrur show similarities to the Elephanta Caves near Mumbai (1,900 km away), Angkor Wat in Cambodia (4,000 km away), and the rock-cut temples of Mahabalipuram in Tamil Nadu (2,700 km away). The features also suggest the influence of "Gupta classicism", and therefore he places their construction in the 8th century. The area around the temple complex has caves and ruins which, suggests that the Masrur region once had a large human settlement.

According to Meister, the temples are from the first half of the 8th century based on the regional political and art history. The temples follow one version of the Nagara architecture, a style that developed in Central India, particularly during the rule of the Hindu king Yasovarman, an art patron. (Note: Several scholars attribute major Hindu temples including iconic ones such as the Teli ka Mandir in Gwalior to Yasovarman era.) In Kashmir, a region immediately north and northwest of the site, Hindus built temples with square pyramidal towers by the mid 1st millennium CE, such as the numerous stone temples built by Hindu king Lalitaditya, another art patron. These kingdoms traditionally collaborated as well as competed in their construction projects rivalry, while the guilds of artists moved between the two regions, through the valleys of ancient Himachal Pradesh. The region is in the Himalayan terrain and forested, making conquests difficult and expensive. Historical records from the 6th to 12th centuries do not mention any military rivalries in the Beas river Kangra valley region. There is a mention of a Himalayan kingdom of Bharmour just north of Masrur area in early medieval era texts. The 12th-century text Rajatarangini as well as the 12th-century Kashmir chronicle by Kalhana, both mention political rivalries in the 9th century but these 11th and 12th century authors were too far removed in time from 8th century events, and they weave in so much ancient mythology that their semi-fictional texts are largely ahistorical and unreliable.

The inscriptions and architecture suggest that Yasovarman's influence had reached the Himalayan foothills in north India, and the central Indian influence is illustrated in the architectural style adopted for Masrur temples rather than the styles found in ruined and excavated temples of the northwestern Indian subcontinent. According to Meister, the influence of middle India must have reached the north Indian region earlier than the 8th century and this style was admired by the royal class and the elites, because this style of temple building is now traceable in many more historic sites such as those in Bajaura and many places in Himachal Pradesh, Uttarakhand, and Nepal where many of the holy rivers of Hindus emerge. Some of the smaller stone temples that have survived from this region in steep mountain terrain are from the 7th century. Further, these large temple complexes in the second half of the 1st millennium were expensive projects and required substantial patronage, which suggests that the earlier examples must have preceded them for wide social and theological acceptance.

== History ==
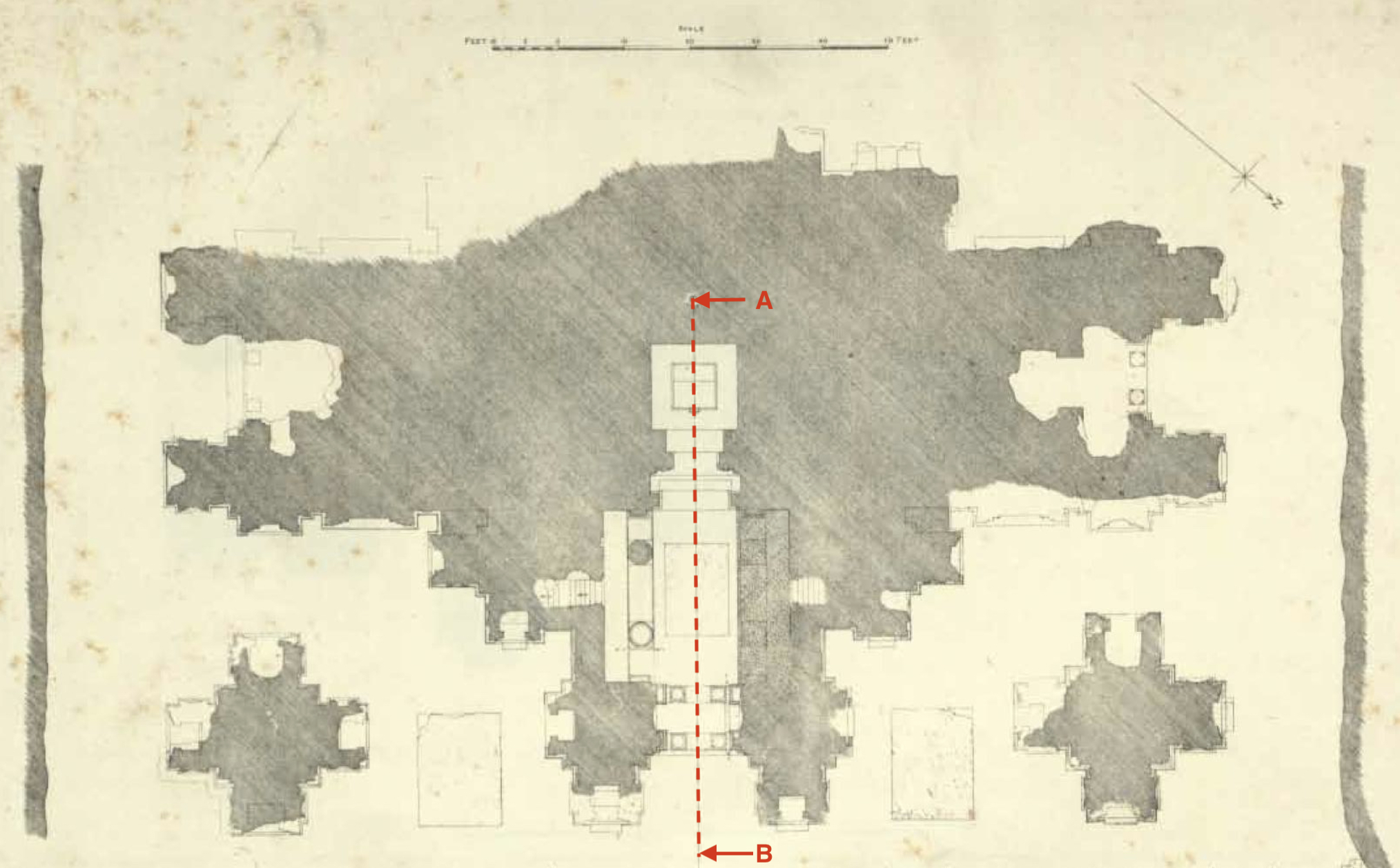
Ground plan

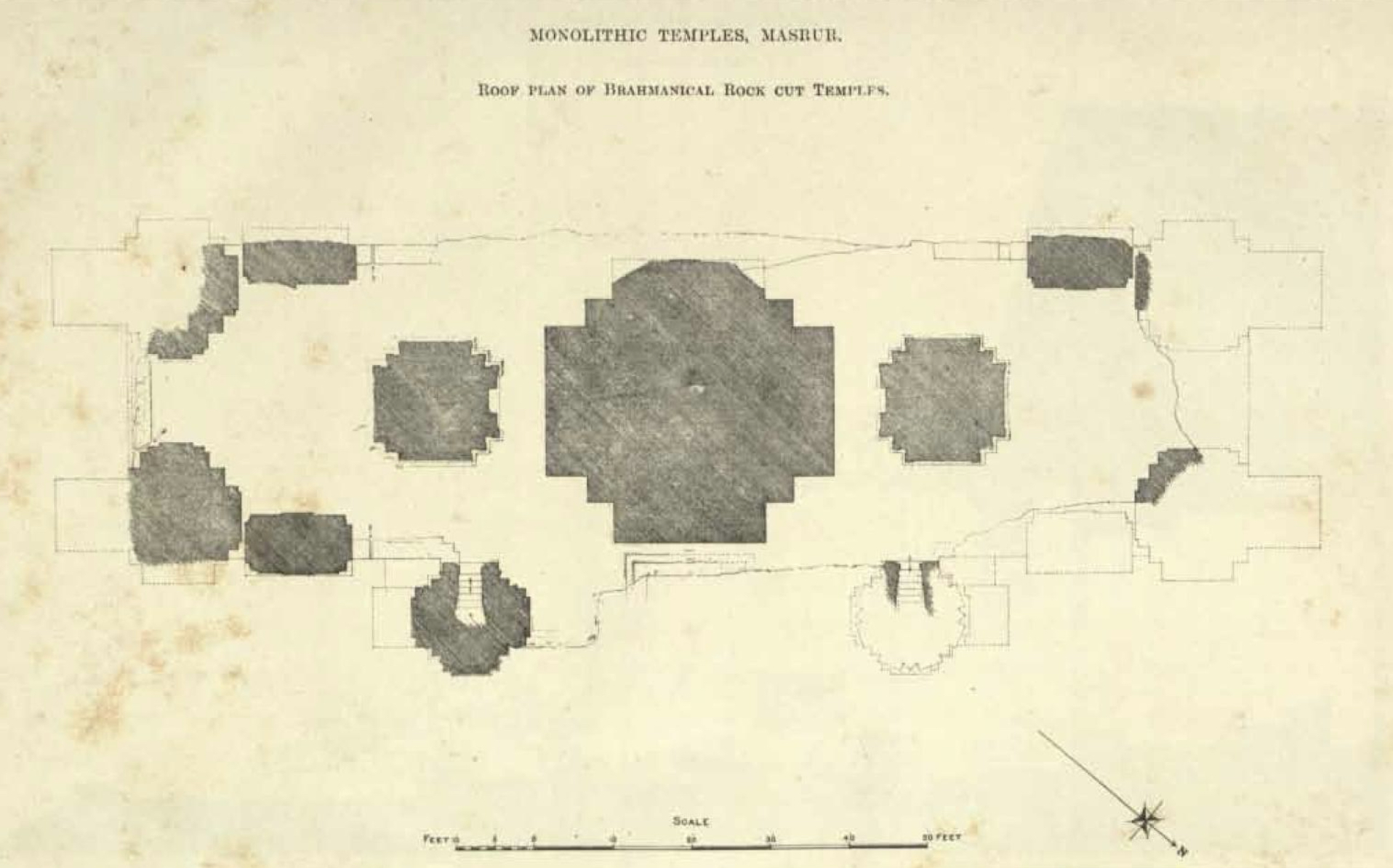
Roof plan

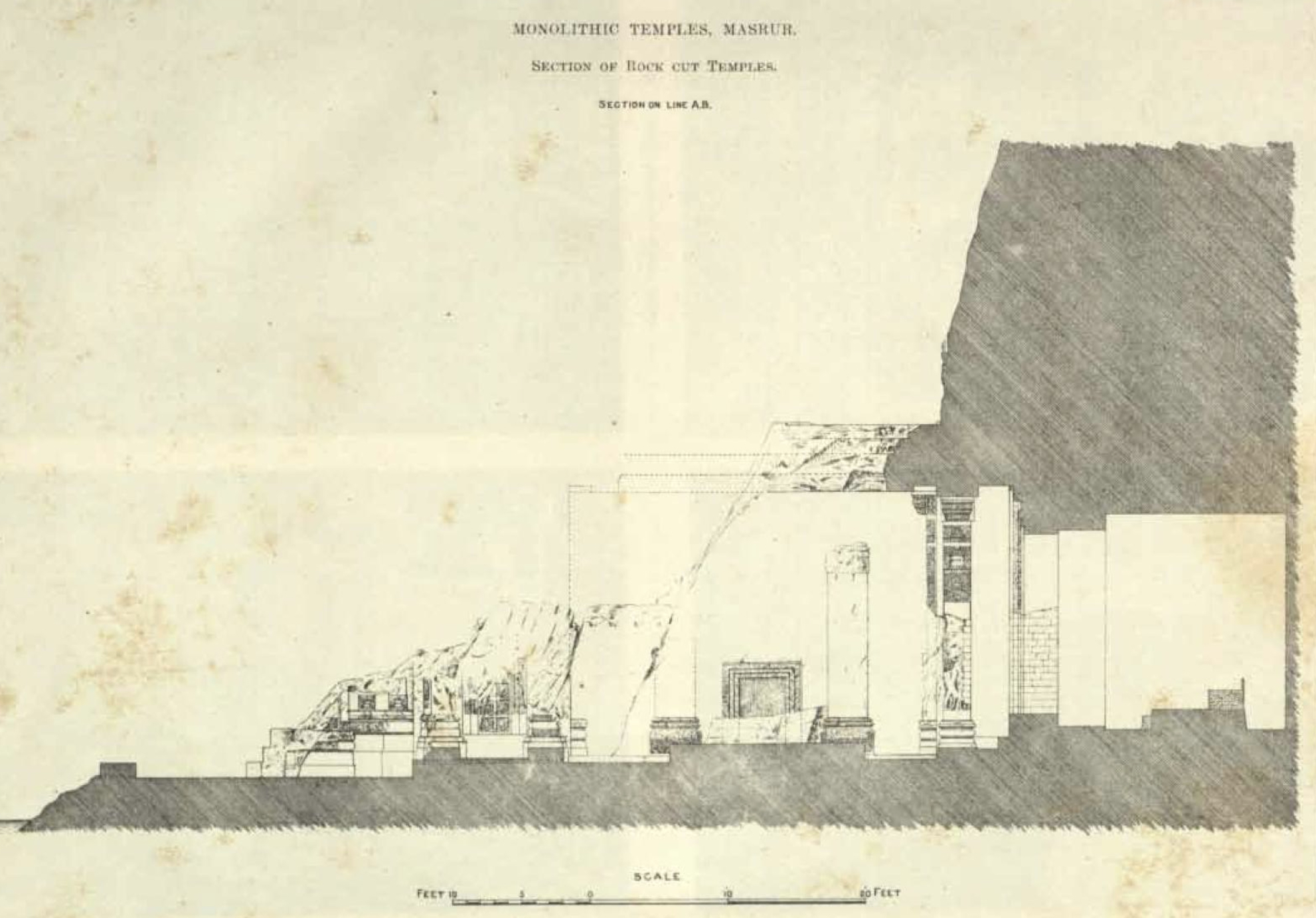
Section

Masrur temple plan and section (1915 sketch)

The period between 12th and 19th century was largely of religious wars and geo-political instability across the Indian subcontinent, and the literature of this era do not mention Masrur temples or present any scholarly studies on any Hindu, Jain or Buddhist temples for that matter, rather they mention iconoclasm and temple destruction. After the 12th century, first northwestern Indian subcontinent, then India, in general, witnessed a series of plunder raids and attacks of Turko-Afghan sultans led Muslim armies seeking wealth, geopolitical power and the spread of Islam. (Note: The Muslim historians mention the looting and destruction of temples. Some texts also mention periods of tolerance and temple repairs such as those during the rule of Akbar.) Successive Muslim dynasties controlled the Delhi Sultanate as waves of wars, rebellions, secessions, and brutal counter-conquests gripped Indian regions including those in and around Kashmir. The Mughal Empire replaced the Delhi Sultanate in early 16th-century. The Mughal dynasty ruled much of the Indian subcontinent through early 18th-century, and parts of it nominally through the 19th century. The Kangra valley region with Masrur in the Himalayas was ruled by smaller jagirdars and feudatory Hill Rajas who paid tribute to the Mughal administration for many centuries. The arrival of the colonial era marked another seismic shift in the region's politics. By the late 19th century, British India officials had begun archeological surveys, documented sites and charted out site plans. The first known visits to study the Masrur temples occurred in 1887.

A British empire officer Henry Shuttleworth visited and photographed the temples in 1913, calling it a "Vaishnava temple" and claiming in his report that he was the first European to visit them. He wrote a paper on the temples, which was published by the journal The Indian Antiquary. He shared his findings with Harold Hargreaves, then an officer of the Northern Circle of the Archaeology Survey of India. Hargreaves knew more about Hindu theology, noticed the Shiva linga in the sanctum and he corrected Shuttleworth's report. Hargreaves wrote up his tour and published his photographs and observations in 1915 as a part of the ASI Annual Report Volume 20. Hargreaves acknowledged the discovery that a draftsman in his office had already toured, measured and created temples plans and sections in 1887, and that some other ASI workers and Europeans had visited the temple in 1875 and after 1887. The Hargreaves report described the site as many temples, listed iconography at these temples from different Hindu traditions, mentioned his speculations on links with Mahabalipuram monuments and Gandhara art, and other theories. The Hargreaves text became the introduction to Masrur temples for guides by reporters with little to no background knowledge of Indian temple traditions or Hindu theology. According to Meister, these early 20th century writings became a source of the temple's misidentification and misrepresentations that followed.

=== Earthquake damage ===
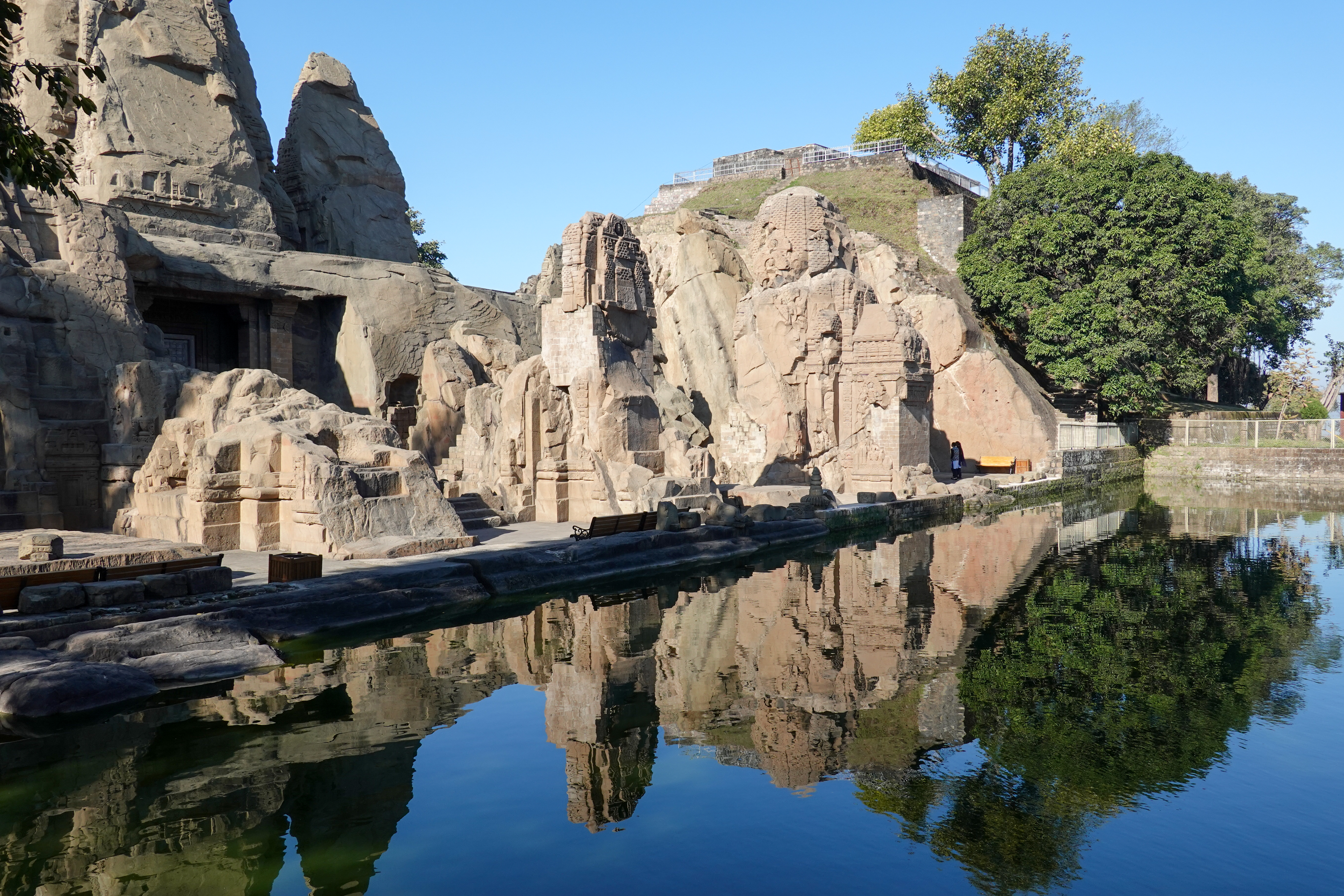
Damaged right-hand section, with reflection in the sacred pool.

The site was already damaged but still in decent condition in the late 19th century. Hargreaves wrote that, "the remote situation and general inaccessibility of the temples have been at once the cause of their neglect and of their fortunate escape from the destroying hands of the various Muhammadan invaders of the valley". In the 1905 Kangra earthquake, the Himachal valley region was devastated. Numerous ancient monuments were destroyed. However, although parts of the Masrur temple cracked and tumbled, the temple remained standing, because of its monolithic nature built out of stone in-situ.

The damage from wars and 1905 earthquake of the region has made comparative studies difficult. However, the careful measurements and drawings made by the unknown draftsperson in 1887, particularly of the roof level and mandapa which were destroyed in 1905, have been a significant source for late 20th-century scholarship. It supports Shuttleworth's early comments that the temple complex has a "perfect symmetry of design".

== Description ==
Masrur temple: symmetry of design

At first, it seems an extravagant and confused mass of spires,
doorways and ornament. The perfect symmetry of the design,
all centering in the one supreme spire, immediately over the
small main cell, which together form the vimana,
can only be realized after a careful examination of each part
in relation to the other.

— Henry Shuttleworth, 1913

The main monument at the Masrur temples site appears, at first sight, to be a complex of shrines, but it is an integrated monument. Its center has a principal shrine which unlike most Hindu temples does not face east, but faces Northeast towards the snowy Himalayan peaks of Dhauladhar range. The main spire is flanked by subsidiary spires of smaller size, all eight symmetrically placed to form an octagon (or two rotated squares). These spires of the temple seem to grow out of the natural rock that makes the mountain. Above the main sanctum, the rock was cut to form the flat roof and the second level of the temple naturally fused with the rising main spire (shikhara) as well as the eight subsidiary shrines.

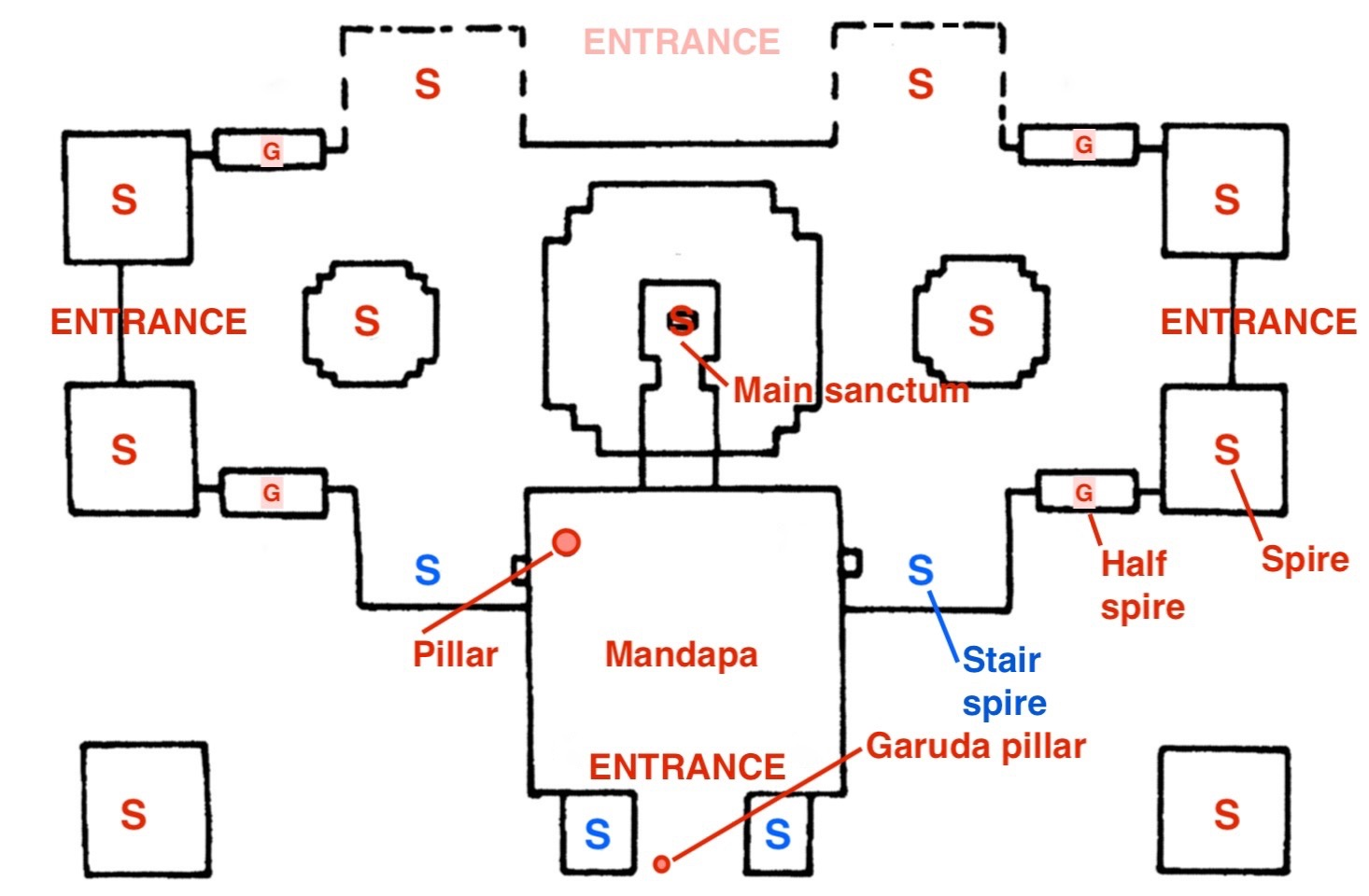
Some structures and the plan at Masrur temple (1913 sketch, incomplete).

The main sanctum has four entrances, of which one on the east side is complete, two on the north and south side are partially complete and the fourth can be seen but is largely incomplete. (Note: For a photo of the incomplete north entrance, for example, see Figure 13 in Meister's 2006 publication.) (Note: The temple did not have a door, was always open as is typical in ancient and medieval Hindu temples. It had a raised mandapa and walled portico before. However, after the quake, both were gone. The temple management added a thick wooden door to prevent wild animals and cattle, looking for new shelter to settle in, from entering the sanctum.) The eastern entrance had a large mandapa and a portico, but this was destroyed in the 1905 earthquake, its existence known from site visit notes prior to the earthquake. Attached to this mandapa were two stairs to take the pilgrims to the upper-level views. The stairs were set inside smaller two rotating stair spires, but much of the structure of this too is gone. Thus, at one time the main temple had 13 spires according to Hargreaves count, and 15 according to Shuttleworth's count, all designed to appear growing naturally out of the rock.

According to Meister, the early descriptions though well-intentioned were based on information then available and clouded by the presumptions of those authors. These presumptions and generally damaged condition of the complex, for example, led Shuttleworth and Hargreaves to describe the temple in terms such as "subsidiary" and "shrines" instead of witnessing the integrated plan and architecture in early Hindu texts on temple design.

=== Material of construction ===
The temple complex was carved out of the natural sandstone rock. In some places, the rock is naturally very hard, which would have been difficult to carve, but is also the reason why the intricate carvings on it have preserved for over 1,000 years. In other places the stone was soft or of medium quality. In some cases, the artists carved with a bit softer stone and this has eroded over time from natural causes. In other cases, the stone's hardness was so low that the artists cut out the stone and substituted it with better stone blocks. Then they added their friezes or sculptures. The substituted blocks have better resisted the effect of nature and time.

=== Pool and mandapa ===
The temple complex has a sacred pool in front on the east side. The construction of the sacred pool is dated to the early 8th century. Its rectangular dimensions are about 25 by 50 metres (82 ft × 164 ft), or two stacked squares. The temple had an outside square mandapa with about 27 feet (8.2 m) side and 20 feet (6.1 m) height. It had a solid 1.5 feet (0.46 m) thick roof supported by four carved massive pillars. The platform had a covered drainage system to allow water anywhere on the mandapa to naturally drain off. This was visible before the 1905 quake, now only remnants of the floor and a pillar remain.

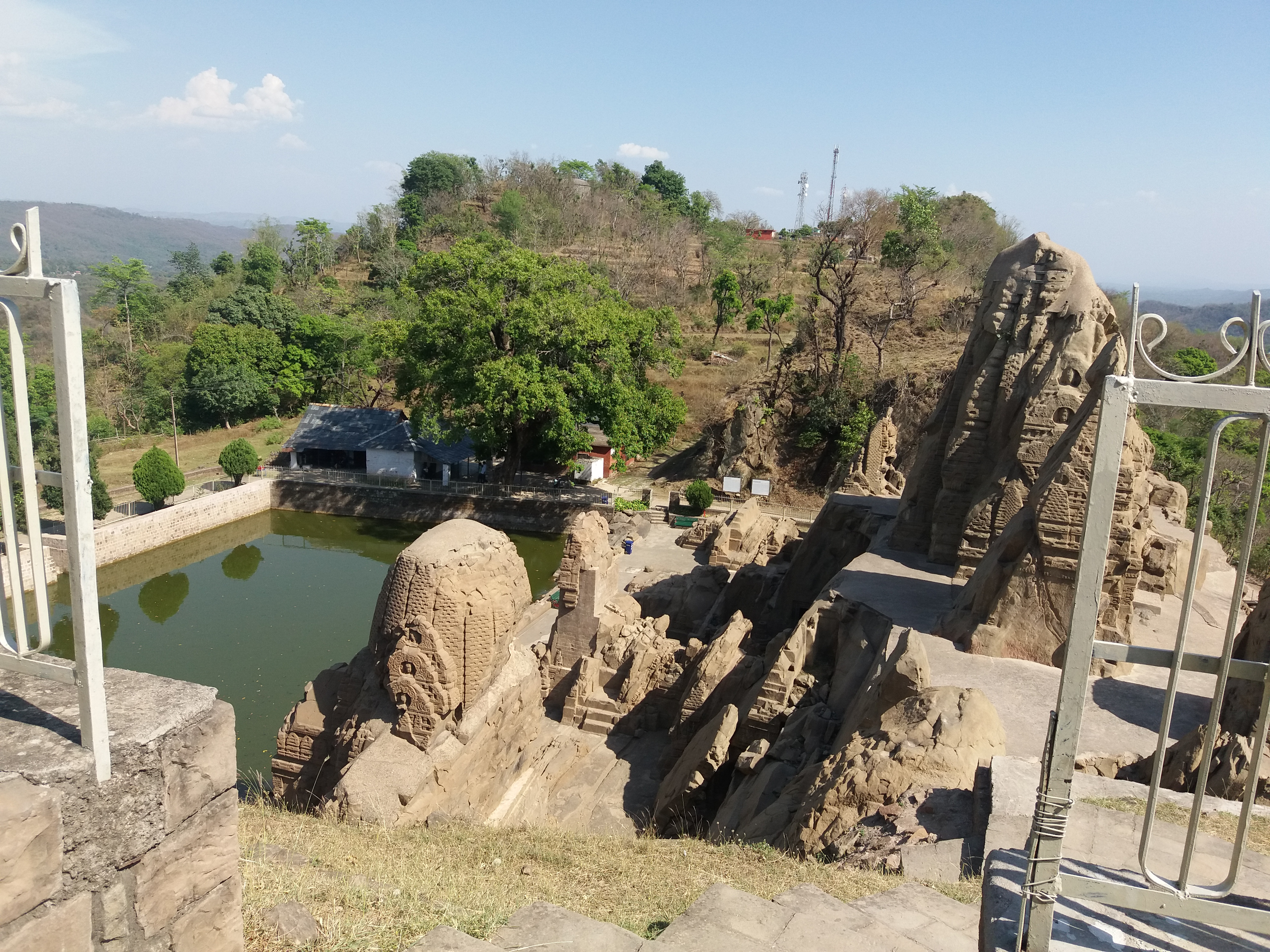
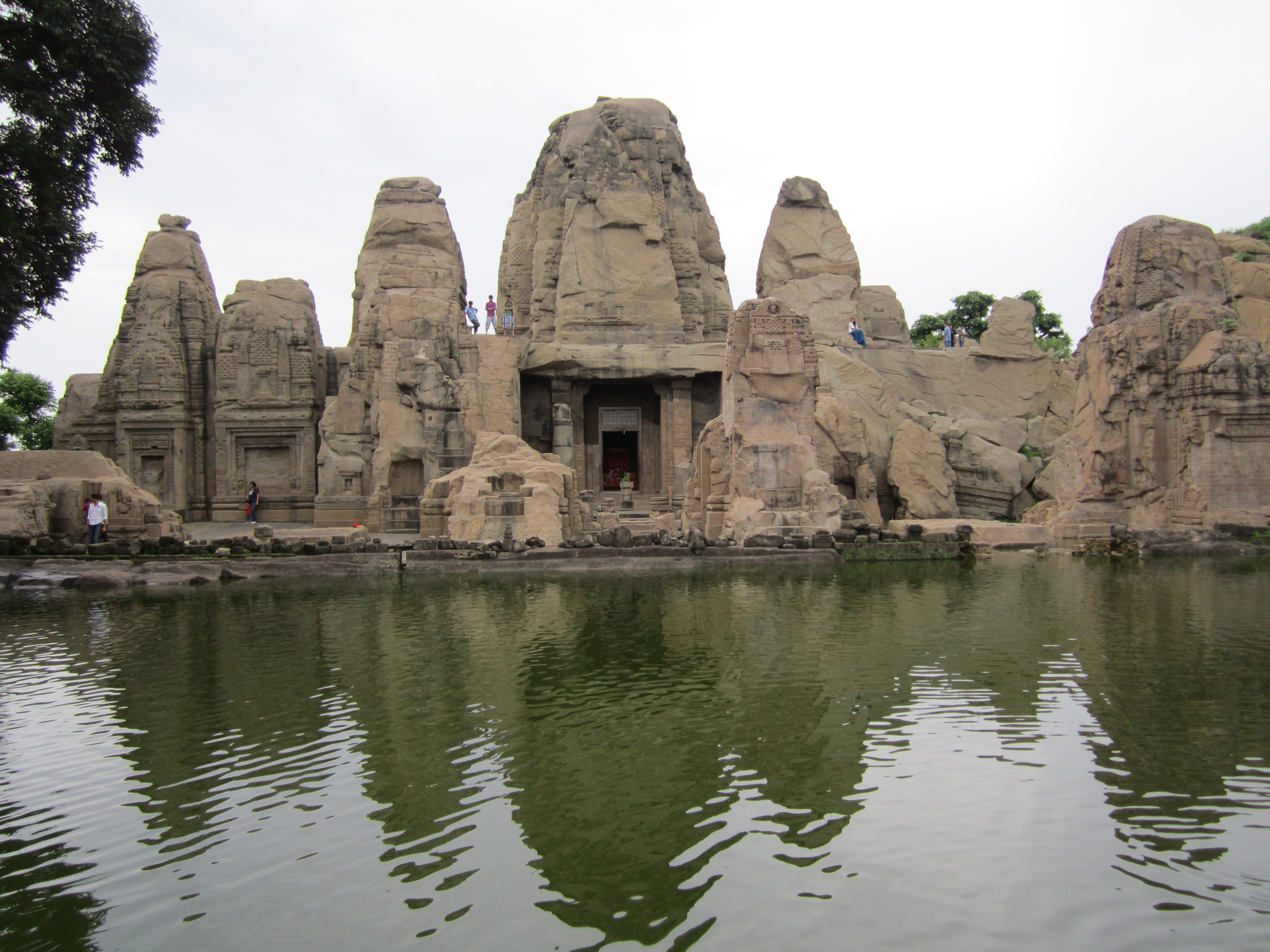
Two views of the temple pool.

The entrances lead the pilgrim and visitor towards the main sanctum, through a series of mandapas with wall carvings and then an antarala (vestibule). They also connect the created space to a pair of covered stairs, on the north and south side, to the upper floor from where he or she can complete a pradakshina (circumambulation) to view more sculptures and the mountain scenery, all of this space and structure created from the pre-existing monolithic rock.

=== Sanctum and ceiling ===
The garbhagriha, in a square plan with each side of 13 feet (4.0 m). The main sanctum has a four faced Shiva.

The ceiling of various mandapa and the sanctum inside the temple are fully carved, predominantly with open lotus. However, the inside walls remained incomplete. This may be because the artists carving into the rock worked on cutting and finishing the ceiling first, then moved on to cutting, finishing and decorating the inside walls and creating pillars below those ceilings. The wall height is 16 feet (4.9 m), and only the eastern entrance and passage into the sanctum is fully complete, while the side entrances are not and the fourth western entrance being the least complete. The site suggests that the work was completed in parallel by teams of workers. This is a common style of construction found in numerous Hindu temples that have survived, at least in the ruins form, from the 1st millennium. The 8th-century three-entry, four-faced Shiva found at the Masrur temple is not unique as the same plan is found in the Jogesvari Cave temple near Mumbai. The Jogesvari is dated to have been completed between 400 and 450 CE, or several centuries before the Masrur temple's construction, suggesting a common thematic foundation that inspired these temples pre-existed in the Hindu texts. (Note: The Jogesvari Hindu cave temple is generally dated to either the 5th century or the 6th. For example, Walter Spink in his 1978 paper proposed Jogesvari to be the link between Ajanta Caves and Elephanta Caves, and dated its completion in the decades immediately after the Ajanta Caves, or 500-525 CE.)

The art historian Stella Kramrisch identified one of these Hindu architecture texts to be the Visnudharmottara, dated to have existed by the 8th century (floruit), and whose manuscripts have been found with Hindus of the Kashmir valley. This is one of such texts that describe "hundred-and-one [Hindu] temple" designs. According to Meister, the sanctum and spire plan for the Masrur temple fits one of these, where it is called the Kailasa design.

The Kailasa style of Hindu temple is one with a central Shikhara (spire) symmetrically surrounded by four smaller spires set between the four entrances into the temple from the four cardinal directions, a format that matches the Masrur temple plan. Further, the Visnudharmottara text also describes the principles and procedures for image making and painting, the former is also found preserved in the Masrur temple mandapa and sanctum. Further, the Jogesvari and Masrur are not the only surviving temples that correspond to this style, others have been discovered that do, such as the Bajaura Hindu temple in Kulu valley of Himachal Pradesh which is another stone temple. (Note: The Bajaura temples is also called as the Bishweshwar Temple, dated to be from the last centuries of the 1st millennium, more specifically to late 9th century by George Michell. Other correspondences are found in preserved temple structure that are not rock-cut, but structural ones such as the Chatrari temple, which can be more firmly dated to the 8th-century based on inscriptions found at the site.)

The multi-spire style, states Meister, is possibly inspired by the Indian Meru mythology shared by Buddhists, Hindus and Jains. Lush mountainous Meru is heaven and the abode of gods, but mountains are not singular but exist in ranges. The highest Mount Kailasha is the abode of Shiva, and the secondary spires symbolize the mountain range. Eight heavenly continents surround the Mount Kailasha in this mythology, where all the Deva (gods) and Devi (goddesses) live together. The Masrur temple symbolically projects this mythical landscape, narrating the Indian cosmology from stone, into stone.

=== Spire design ===
All spires in the Masrur temple are of Nagara style, an architecture that was developed and refined in central India in the centuries before the 8th century. More specifically, these are what Indian texts called the latina sub-style, from lata. These are curvilinear spires composed of a rhythmic series of superimposed shrinking horizontal square slabs with offsets, each offset called lata or grape vine-like, in principle reflecting natural growth on a mountain in stone.

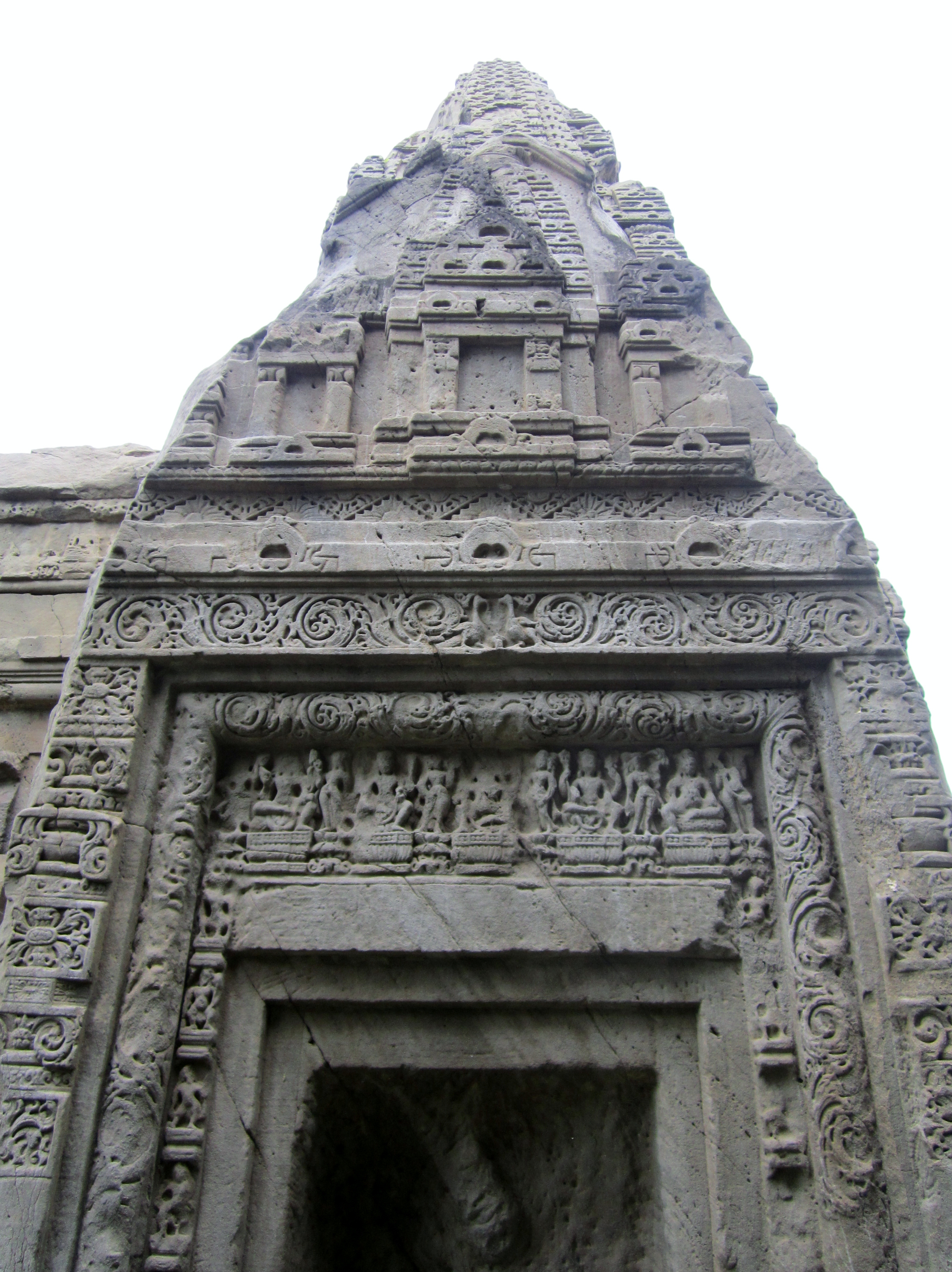
One of the spires with lintel carvings.

The superstructure towers embed styles that are found in Indian temples from the 7th and 8th-century such as in the Mahua Hindu temple and the Alampur Navabrahma Temples, but these are no longer found in temples that can be firmly dated after the 8th century. This supports dating the Masrur temple to about the mid-8th century. The spires show differences, but all spires that are symmetrically position in the temple mandala show the same design. The stairway spire is based on four turned squares, and features eight rotating lata spines that alternate with eight right-angled projections.

The temple complex also has two free-standing sub-shrines near the sacred pool. These have spires with sixteen lata spines, a style that is uncommon in India and found associated with Shiva temples associated with Hindu monks of the Matamayura matha between the 7th and 12th century CE such as the Bajaura temple in nearby Kulu valley and the Chandrehi temple in central India.

=== Sculpture and reliefs ===
The main sanctum has nine seated deities. The center one is Shiva, and with him are others including Vishnu, Indra, Ganesha, Kartikeya and Durga. The shrines around the central shrine feature five Devis in one case, while other shrines reverentially enshrine Vishnu, Lakshmi, Ganesha, Kartikeya, Surya, Indra and Saraswati. The avatars of Vishnu such as the Varaha and the Narasimha are presented in the niches. In the ruins have been found large sculptures of Varuna, Agni and others Vedic deities. The temple also includes fusion or syncretic ideas revered in Hinduism, such as Ardhanarishvara (half Parvati, half Shiva), Harihara (half Vishnu, half Shiva) and a three faced trinity that shows Brahma, Vishnu and Shiva in one sculpture. The temple also has secular images from the common life of people, of couples in courtship and various levels of intimacy (mithuna), people making music and dancing, apsaras and ornamental scrollwork.

The surviving structures in the Masrur temple lacks any image of Lakulisha, the founder of Pashupata Shaivism, which makes it unlikely that this temple was associated with that tradition. According to Meister, the wide range of Shaiva, Vaishnava, Shakti and Saura (Surya, sun god) themes displayed within the Masrur temple suggest that it was built by those who cherish ecumenism or henotheism, of the style commonly found in Pancharatra literature of Hinduism.

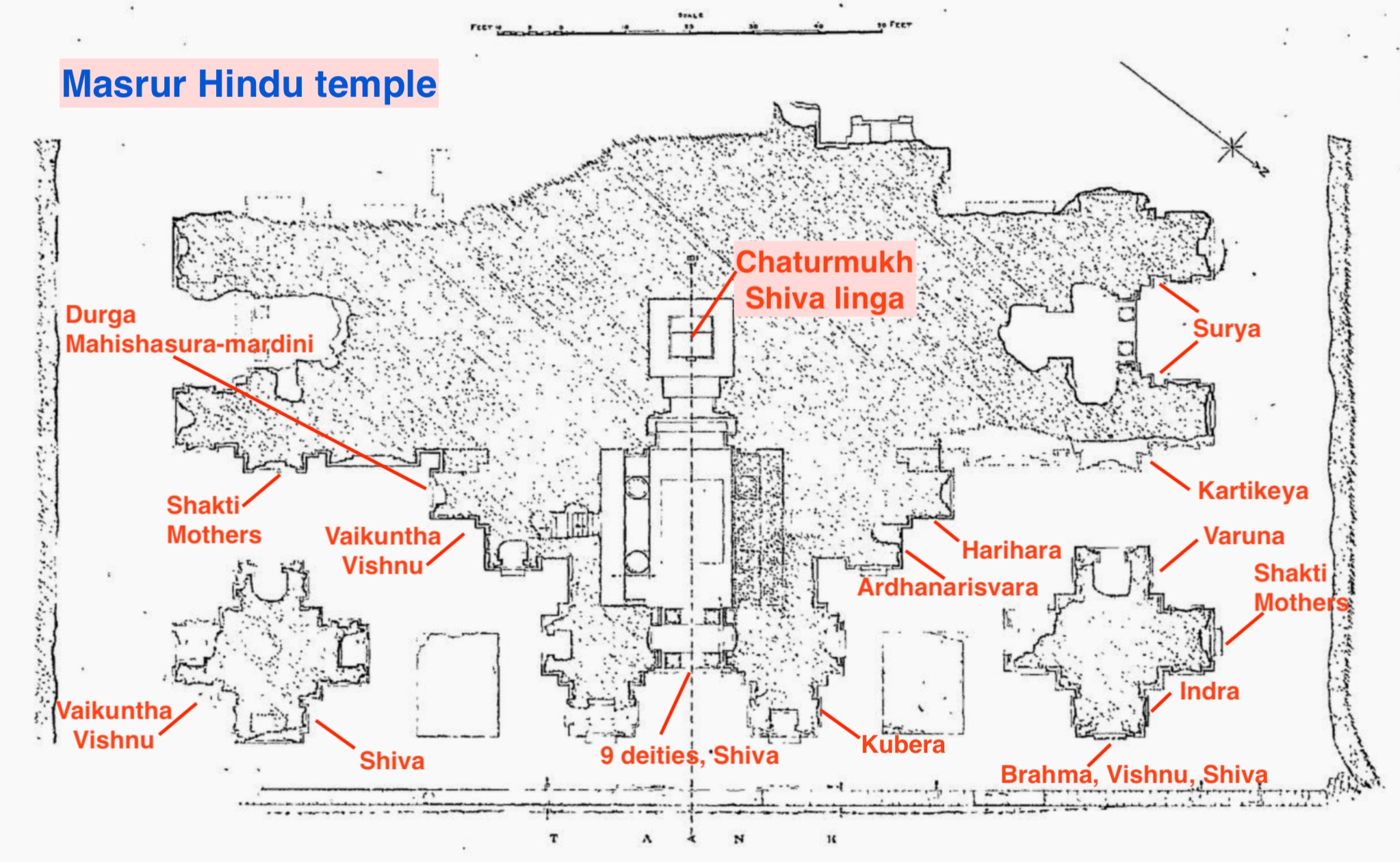
The Masrur rock-cut temple presents a diversity of iconography, likely reflecting ecumenism or henotheism in 8th-century Hinduism. Above: Incomplete iconography locations.

=== Pilgrim resthouse ===
According to Hargreaves, when he visited the temple for the first time in 1913, the temple complex had a dharmashala (pilgrim's resthouse), a kitchen and there was a priest for whom there was a small integrated living quarters. The temple work was priest's part-time work, while his main source of livelihood was from maintaining cattle and working in farms.

=== Analysis and interpretation ===
The Masrur temple and the 8th-century Prasat Ak Yum temple found in Siam Reap, Cambodia have parallels, in that both are temple mountains with a symmetric design.

== Legends ==
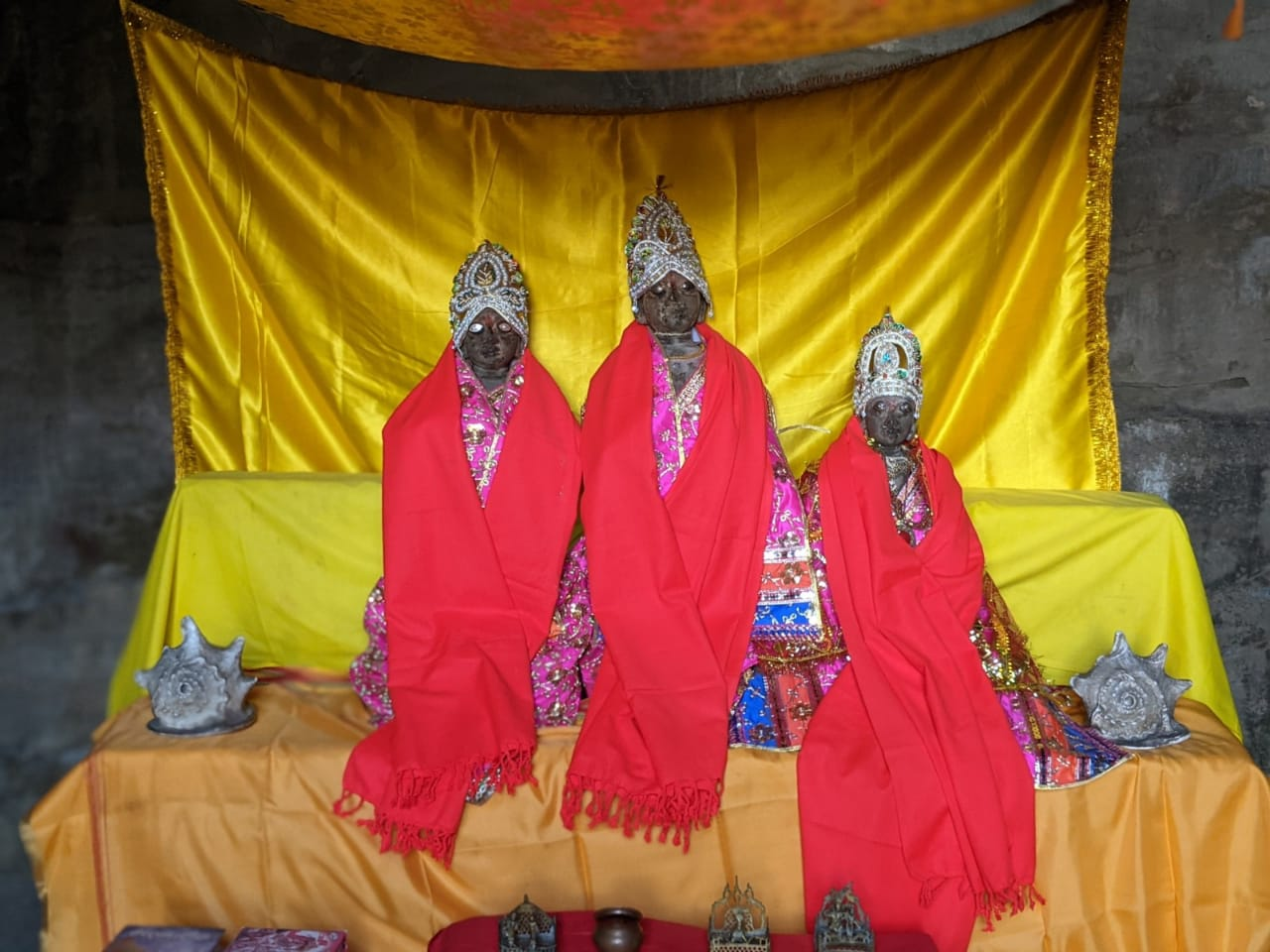
Idols of Masroor Rock Cut Temple

According to a local legend, the Pandavas of Mahabharata fame resided here during their "incognito" exile from their kingdom and built this temple. According to Khan, the identity and location of Pandavas was exposed, so they shifted from here. This is said to be why the temple complex was left unfinished. Sometime in the 20th century, someone introduced three small blackstone statues inside the shrine which faces east. These are of Rama, Lakshmana and Sita of the Ramayana fame.

At least since the time Harold Hargreaves visited the temple in 1913, the central temple has been locally called the Thakurdvara.

== See also ==
- Lakshana Devi Temple, Bharmour – a wooden temple in Himachal Pradesh dated to about 700 CE
- Martand Sun Temple

== Bibliography ==
- Mulk Raj Anand (1997). Splendours of Himachal Heritage. Abhinav Publications. ISBN 978-81-7017-351-9.
- Kapoor, Subodh (2002). The Indian Encyclopaedia: Mahi-Mewat. Cosmo Publications. ISBN 978-81-7755-272-0.
- Khan, Nisar (2014). "Architecture of the Rock-Cut Temples of Masroor". Heritage Conservators, New Delhi. Archived from the original on 4 November 2022.
- Stella Kramrisch, Hindu Temple: Vols 1 and 2, ISBN 978-8120802223, Princeton University Press
- Michael W. Meister, Encyclopaedia of Indian Temple Architecture, ISBN 978-0195615371
- S.L. Nagar, The temples of Himachal Pradesh. New Delhi: Aditya Prakashan.
- Sinha, Chandreshwar Prasad (1998). Proceedings of the 6th Session of Indian Art History Congress, Shillong, November 1997. Indian Art History Congress.
- Singh, N.K. (2009). Coronation of Shiva: Rediscovering Masrur Temple. Har-Anand Publications. ISBN 978-81-241-1478-0.
- Prasanna Kumar Acharya (2010). An encyclopaedia of Hindu architecture. Oxford University Press (Republished by Motilal Banarsidass). ISBN 978-81-7536-534-6.
- Prasanna Kumar Acharya (1997). A Dictionary of Hindu Architecture: Treating of Sanskrit Architectural Terms with Illustrative Quotations. Oxford University Press (Reprinted in 1997 by Motilal Banarsidass). ISBN 978-81-7536-113-3.
- Vinayak Bharne; Krupali Krusche (2014). Rediscovering the Hindu Temple: The Sacred Architecture and Urbanism of India. Cambridge Scholars Publishing. ISBN 978-1-4438-6734-4.
- Alice Boner (1990). Principles of Composition in Hindu Sculpture: Cave Temple Period. Motilal Banarsidass. ISBN 978-81-208-0705-1.
- Alice Boner; Sadāśiva Rath Śarmā (2005). Silpa Prakasa. Brill Academic (Reprinted by Motilal Banarsidass). ISBN 978-8120820524.
- A.K. Coomaraswamy; Michael W. Meister (1995). Essays in Architectural Theory. Indira Gandhi National Centre for the Arts. ISBN 978-0-19-563805-9.
- Dehejia, V. (1997). Indian Art. Phaidon: London. ISBN 0-7148-3496-3.
- Adam Hardy (1995). Indian Temple Architecture: Form and Transformation. Abhinav Publications. ISBN 978-81-7017-312-0.
- Adam Hardy (2007). The Temple Architecture of India. Wiley. ISBN 978-0470028278.
- Adam Hardy (2015). Theory and Practice of Temple Architecture in Medieval India: Bhoja's Samarāṅgaṇasūtradhāra and the Bhojpur Line Drawings. Indira Gandhi National Centre for the Arts. ISBN 978-93-81406-41-0.
- Harle, J.C., The Art and Architecture of the Indian Subcontinent, 2nd edn. 1994, Yale University Press Pelican History of Art, ISBN 0300062176
- Monica Juneja (2001). Architecture in Medieval India: Forms, Contexts, Histories. Orient Blackswan. ISBN 978-8178242286.
- Stella Kramrisch (1976). The Hindu Temple Volume 1. Motilal Banarsidass (Reprinted 1946 Princeton University Press). ISBN 978-81-208-0223-0.
- Stella Kramrisch (1979). The Hindu Temple Volume 2. Motilal Banarsidass (Reprinted 1946 Princeton University Press). ISBN 978-81-208-0224-7.
- Michael W. Meister; Madhusudan Dhaky (1986). Encyclopaedia of Indian temple architecture. American Institute of Indian Studies. ISBN 978-0-8122-7992-4.
- George Michell (1988). The Hindu Temple: An Introduction to Its Meaning and Forms. University of Chicago Press. ISBN 978-0-226-53230-1.
- George Michell (2000). Hindu Art and Architecture. Thames & Hudson. ISBN 978-0-500-20337-8.
- T. A. Gopinatha Rao (1993). Elements of Hindu iconography. Motilal Banarsidass. ISBN 978-81-208-0878-2.
- Ajay J. Sinha (2000). Imagining Architects: Creativity in the Religious Monuments of India. University of Delaware Press. ISBN 978-0-87413-684-5.
- Burton Stein (1978). South Indian Temples. Vikas. ISBN 978-0706904499.
- Burton Stein (1989). The New Cambridge History of India: Vijayanagara. Cambridge University Press. ISBN 978-0-521-26693-2.
- Burton Stein; David Arnold (2010). A History of India. John Wiley & Sons. ISBN 978-1-4443-2351-1.
- Kapila Vatsyayan (1997). The Square and the Circle of the Indian Arts. Abhinav Publications. ISBN 978-81-7017-362-5.
