= Sajjad Ahmad Kichloo =

Indian politician (born 1964)

Sajjad Ahmed Kichloo

Member of the Jammu and Kashmir Legislative Council
- In office 2015–2016
- Governor: N. N. Vohra
- Chief Minister: Mufti Mohammad Sayeed
- Constituency: Kishtwar

Member of the Jammu and Kashmir Legislative Assembly
- In office 2008–2014
- Governor: N. N. Vohra
- Chief Minister: Omar Abdullah
- Constituency: Kishtwar

Minister of State for Home Affairs, Jammu and Kashmir
- In office 2009–2013
- Governor: N. N. Vohra
- Chief Minister: Omar Abdullah

Member of the Jammu and Kashmir Legislative Assembly
- In office 2002–2008
- Governor: N. N. Vohra
- Chief Minister: Mufti Mohammad Sayeed; Ghulam Nabi Azad
- Constituency: Kishtwar

Personal details
- Born: 20 June 1964 (age 62) Kishtwar, India
- Party: Jammu & Kashmir National Conference
- Education: Diploma in Computer & Mechanical Engineering
- Occupation: Politician

Sajjad Ahmed Kichloo (born 23 June 1965) is an Indian politician, Member of Parliament for Rajya Sabha and former member of the Jammu and Kashmir Legislative Assembly who served as a State Home minister in the first Omar Abdullah ministry in 2009. A member of the Jammu and Kashmir National Conference, he was elected as a member of legislative assembly during the 2002 and the 2008 legislative assembly elections from Kishtwar constituency. He also served as a member of the Legislative Council in 2015, representing Kishtwar district.

== Career ==
Kachloo was born to Bashir Ahmad Kichloo on 20 June 1974 in Kishtwar, India. His father was also a member of the National Conference (NC). Kichloo entered politics following his father's death. He has a diploma in computer & mechanical engineering. He began his career in 1996 as the tehsil president of the National Conference's youth wing. In 1998, he became the district president of the NC in Kishtwar. He contested the 2002 Jammu and Kashmir Legislative Assembly election from the Kishtwar constituency. He was re-elected in the 2008 Assembly elections.

In 2013, Kichloo was appointed the minister of State for Home in the government of Jammu and Kashmir.

He was awarded the best legislator award by Jammu and Kashmir Legislative Council in 2017 during the then PDP - BJP government.

== Controversies ==
=== Allegations of assault ===
Kichloo's political career was marred by controversy when he was accused of assaulting Riaz Ahmed Choudhary, the chief executive officer (CEO) of the Kishtwar Development Authority, during preparations for an official visit by the then chief minister Omar Abdullah to Kishtwar district in April 2013. Choudhary alleged Kichloo's misconduct and ordered his arrest, a claim that led to media attention and public scrutiny.

=== Alleged Role in 2013 clashes ===
Kachloo resigned as the State Home minister in August 2013, following allegations of his involvement in the 2013 Kishtwar clashes on 9 August 2013. The violence resulted in the deaths of three people and the destruction of over 150 shops and houses, attributed to the administration's failure, including Kachloo to control the situation. He was later exonerated of any involvement in the clashes that occurred on 9 August 2013. The Justice R.C. Gandhi Commission of Enquiry, a one-man commission led by Justice (retired) R.C. Gandhi, determined that Kichloo was not guilty of any partisan conduct during the incident.
