= Chowgan ground =

Park in Kishtwar, Jammu and Kashmir, India

Chowgan
- Parade ground
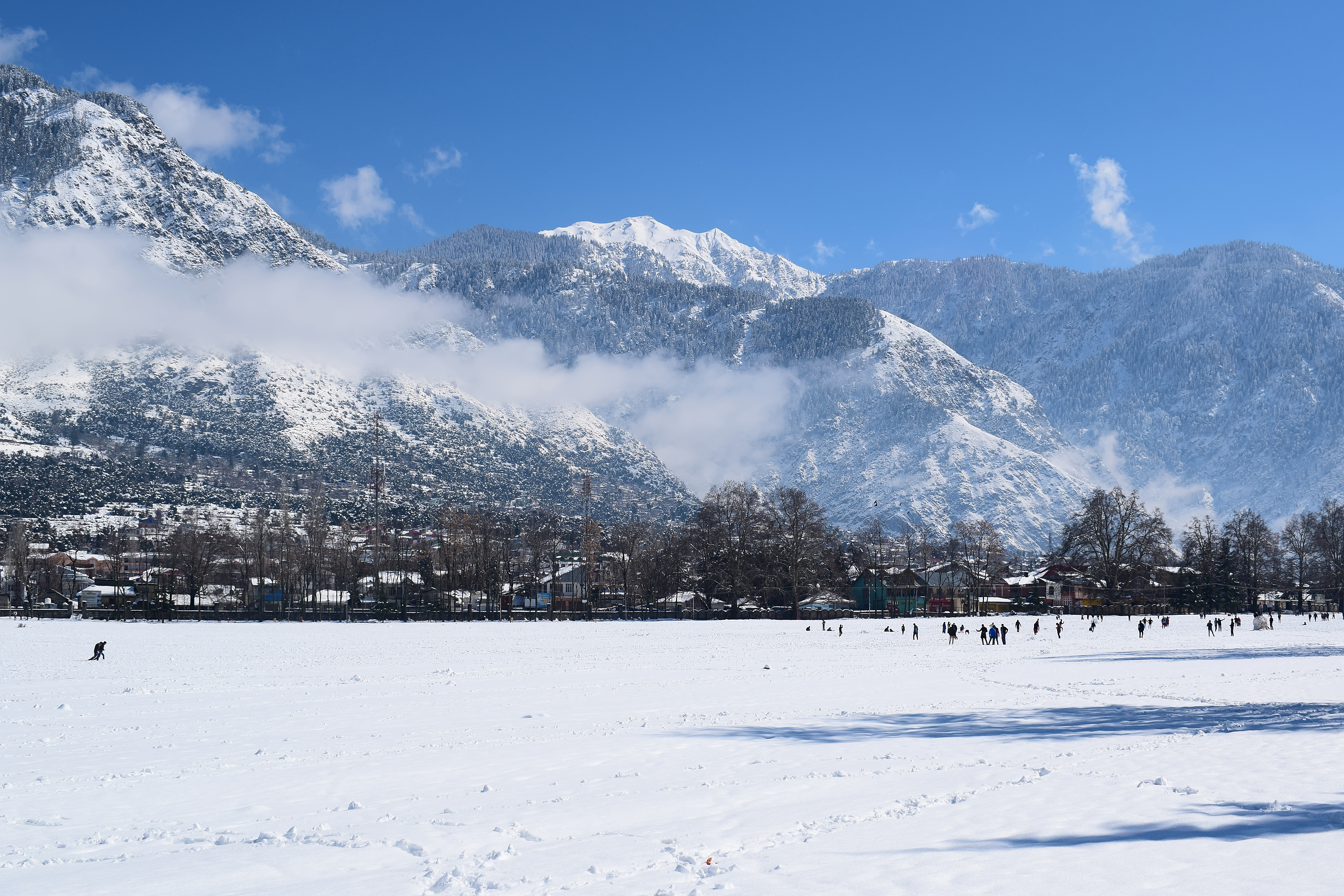
- Chowgan ground in Kishtwar, India, after a fresh snowfall

- Location within Jammu and Kashmir Location within India
- Type: Public place and park
- Location: Kishtwar, Jammu & Kashmir, India
- Coordinates: 33.322278°N 75.759578°E
- Area: 65 acres (26.30 ha)
- Operator: Kishtwar Development Authority
- Open: 24 hours
- Status: Open all year

Chowgan is a large ground and tourist attraction in the Kishtwar town, in the Jammu division of Jammu and Kashmir, India, surrounded by chinar, cedar and other trees. It measures about 65 acres (26.30 ha). This ground is also used as a grazing ground for livestock like cows and goats. At the south side of the ground is the shrine of the Sufi saint Farid-ud-Din Baghdadi.

== Name ==
"Chowgan" literally means "polo"; this ground was used to play chovgan, a polo-like game, in ancient times.

== History ==
According to official government data, this place was a lake in ancient times, namely Goverdhansar Lake, but due to a natural disaster, the water of the lake flowed out leaving a large open area, which was named as Chowgan.

There is a ban imposed by the local administration on the entrance of non-essential vehicles to this ground.

== Location ==
This ground is located about 1,500 metres (1.5 km) from the bus stand in downtown Kishtwar, and National Highway 244 runs along it from the south-east to the west. There is a small helipad on the northern side. This ground is the shortcut to various areas. The Bun Astan, Matta, and Sarkoot areas linked to it, as well as the Dak Bunglow and Kuleed. A small park known as Char Chinar is located at the north-east of this ground.

== Events ==
The Chowgan ground is used for Eid and Muslim funeral prayers, and by the Hindus of Kishtwar town for Dussehra and Rama Navami. Every year, cricket tournaments are organized on the ground, and other games like football, lawn tennis, and baseball are played here throughout the year.
