= Bhanauta =

Coordinates: 32°37′N 76°05′E

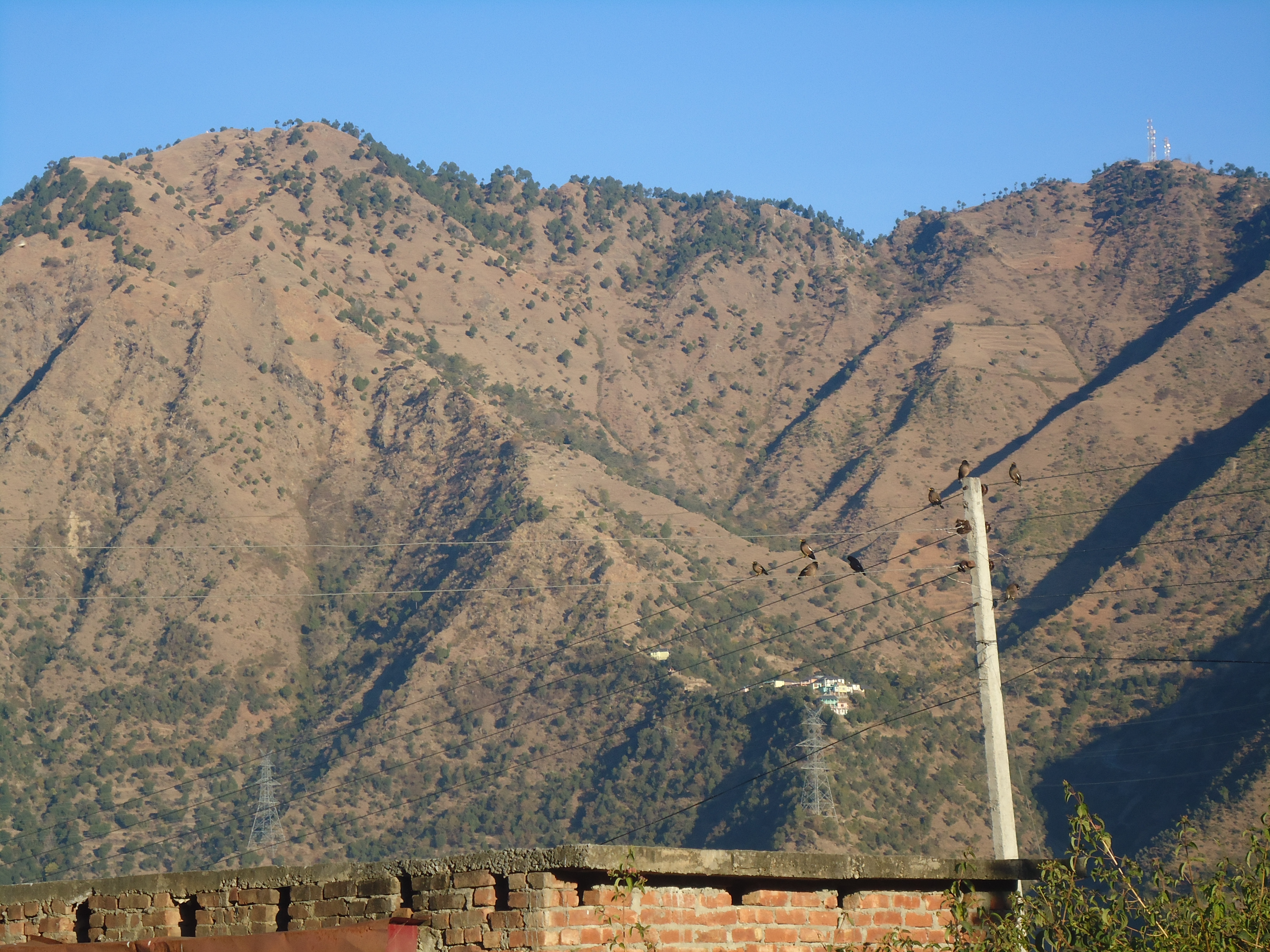
View of Rupani Village of Rajnagar Panchayat from Bhanauta

Bhanauta is a village located in Chamba District, Himachal Pradesh. It is located 9 km (5.6 mi) towards north from District headquarters Chamba, 15 km (9.3 mi) from Chamba, 385.8 km (239.7 mi) from the state capital Shimla and 585.6 km (363.9 mi) from the national capital Delhi.

Bhanauta has about 314 families. The population is 1604 of which 804 are males while 800 are females as per the census of 2011.

== Geography ==
The population of children with age 0-6 is 205 and makes up 12.78% of total population. Average sex ratio of Bhanauta is 995 which is higher than the Himachal Pradesh state average of 972. Child Sex Ratio for the Bhanauta per the 2011 census is 934, higher than Himachal Pradesh average of 909.

== Demography ==
Bhanauta has a lower literacy rate compared to Himachal Pradesh. In 2011, the literacy rate of Bhanauta was 82.77% compared to 82.80% of Himachal Pradesh. In Bhanauta male literacy stands at 91.12% while the female literacy rate was 74.47%.

== Panchayat ==
Per the constitution of India and Panchyati Raaj Act, Bhanauta is administrated by a sarpanch (head of village), who is the elected representative.

Bhanauta's Pin code is 176310 and post office Bhanauta-Salga is situated in Chaned, about 3.2 km away.
