= Kishtwar Airport =

Upcoming domestic airport in Kishtwar, Jammu and Kashmir, India

- IATA: none; ICAO: none

Summary
- Airport type: Military/Public
- Serves: Kishtwar
- Location: Kishtwar, Jammu and Kashmir, India
- Elevation AMSL: 5,200 ft / 1,585 m
- Coordinates: 33°19′36″N 075°45′23″E

Map
- Location of the airport in Jammu and Kashmir Kishtwar Airport (India)

Kishtwar Airport is a proposed regional airport located about 3 kilometres north of Kishtwar near Chowgan Ground in Jammu and Kashmir, India.

== History ==
Starting from 2018, the military airstrip was upgraded for joint use by the Government of Jammu and Kashmir. Kishtwar is proposed to receive enhanced air connectivity through the development of an upgraded airstrip under the Government of India’s UDAN (Ude Desh ka Aam Nagrik) scheme. The existing airstrip, currently measuring approximately 900 metres in length, is planned to be extended to around 1,500 metres to facilitate regular air transport operations. As part of the expansion, about 300 metres of additional land has already been acquired, while the remaining required land is expected to be acquired by the authorities in due course. Officials from the Airports Authority of India have conducted site inspections on multiple occasions. According to various reports, preliminary work on the project is anticipated to commence within the year, subject to administrative approvals and land acquisition processes.The Government has acquired land in Pochhal, Matta and Kishtwar villages.

== Military aviation ==
The Indian Army operates a helipad at this site to carry out helicopter operations to far-off areas of Doda and Kishtwar districts.

== Civil aviation enclave ==
The airstrip has been included in the UDAN scheme, launched by the Ministry of Civil Aviation and is expected to help the promotion of tourism in the region.

== See also ==
- List of airports in India
