= Shah Asrar-ud-Din =

Sufi saint

Hazrat Shah Asrar-ud-Din Baghdadi was a prominent Islamic Sufi saint in the region of Kishtwar, Jammu & Kashmir. His legacy and spiritual influence remain significant among the followers of Sufism and beyond. He was the son of Hazrat Shah Farid-ud-Din Baghdadi, a revered Sufi master, and his family lineage traces back to Baghdad, Iraq with references to their lineage being from Abdul Qadir Gilani, which is why they are referred to as "Baghdadi."

== Early life ==
Shah Asrar-ud-Din was born into a family known for its piety and deep spiritual roots. From a young age, he exhibited signs of extraordinary spiritual talent and inclination towards mysticism. His father, Hazrat Shah Farid-ud-Din, recognized these signs and guided him on the path of Sufism. According to legends, Shah Asrar's father prepared a special sugar syrup on the 25th day of Kartik, recited Quranic verses over it, and then gave it to Shah Asrar to drink, which led to his passing and return to God. He lived for only eighteen years but left a profound impact on his followers and the community.

== Spiritual influence ==
Shah Asrar-ud-Din is remembered for his miracles and spiritual guidance. His teachings emphasized the importance of Tawhid (the oneness of Allah) and the principles of Islam. He was known to have performed numerous miracles, which drew people from various backgrounds to seek his blessings and spiritual guidance. His shrine, known as Darbar-e-Asrariya or Astan-e-Payeen, located in Kishtwar, remains a major pilgrimage site. Devotees flock to his shrine, especially during his Urs (death anniversary) on the 25th of Kartik, to pay their respects and seek spiritual fulfillment.

== Urs celebration ==
The annual Urs of Hazrat Shah Asrar-ud-Din is a significant event in Kishtwar, attracting thousands of devotees. This event is marked by various religious activities, including recitations of the Quran, prayers, and communal meals. It is a time when people from different faiths come together, reflecting the inclusive nature of Sufism that Shah Asrar-ud-Din preached and practiced.

== Legacy ==
Hazrat Shah Asrar-ud-Din Baghdadi's legacy continues to thrive through the numerous devotees who visit his shrine named Darbar-e Asrariya and Astan-e-Payeen in Chowgan and follow his teachings. His life and works have contributed to the spread of Sufism in the region, promoting values of love, peace, and spiritual enlightenment. The shrine stands as a testament to his enduring influence and the deep respect he commands among his followers.
