= Kugti Sanctuary =

Protected area in Himachal Pradesh, India

- IUCN category IV (habitat/species management area)
- Location within Himachal Pradesh Location within India
- Interactive map of Kugti Sanctuary
- Location: Chamba, Himachal Pradesh, India
- Nearest city: Bharmour
- Coordinates: 32°35′55″N 76°53′7″E
- Established: 1962
- Operator: D.F.O. Wildlife, Chamba

Kugti Sanctuary is the second largest sanctuary in the state of Himachal Pradesh. Its situated at an altitude ranging from 2,195 m to 5,040 m. On the west side, Tundah Sanctuary surrounds this sanctuary by a forest corridor.

The landscape of the sanctuary varies, and it is blessed with an abundance of flora and fauna. The area houses a number of medicinal plants along with some of the rare floral species.

High altitude Himalayan fauna species have made this sanctuary their home, including the endangered Himalayan tahr.

There are plenty of water resources here and many of them originate from the glaciers. Kugti Wildlife Sanctuary also houses the famous Manimahesh Temple that is annually visited by thousands of pilgrims.

== Flora ==
Vegetation predominantly consists of moist deodar forest and western mixed coniferous forest. Herbs include Gentiana kuroo (Karu) and Jurinea macrocephala (Dhup).

== Fauna ==
- Snow leopard
- ibex,
- Brown langur,
- common cat,
- leopard,
- deer,
- musk marten,
- Himalayan yellow throated fox,
- Indian/red Serow,
- ghoral,
- Himalayan tahr
- Kalij Pheasant

== Avian-Fauna ==
Monal, snow cock, jungle babbler, red-billed babbler, great hill barbet, black bul-bul, redvented bul-bul, white cheeked bul-bul, crested bunting, greyhead bunting, and more.

== Major attractions ==
Himalayan Tahr: The sanctuary is said to be one of the last homes of Himalayan tahr, which is a large ungulate related to the wild goat. These herbivorous animals have small heads with large eyes and small pointed ears, and are 3 to 4.5 feet long and weigh around 36–90 kg. They are 26 to 40 inches tall. The Himalayan tahr is considered vulnerable by the IUCN (1996) in its home range of the Himalayas.

After first-ever evidence of the snow leopard in Kugti Wildlife Sanctuary in Himachal Pradesh, a recently published paper has recommended further studies to help generate baseline information for conservation of this endangered species.

== Location ==
Kugti Sanctuary is located around 87 km from Chamba in the state of Himachal Pradesh. It is located at a distance of about 30 km from Bharmaur and 15 km from Kugti village.

== Area ==
Its area is 378 km^{2}

== Route ==
The Kugti sanctuary is accessible via Pathankot, Chamba, Bharmour, and Hadsar. From Pathankot to Chamba (122 km), Chamba to Bharmour (65 km), then to Hadsar (13 km). A 13 km trek leads you to Kugti village in the sanctuary.

By Rail: The nearest railhead is Pathankot which is connected to all of the major cities in India. There are buses and taxis available from Chamba and Bharmour until Hadsar.

Now Kugti is reachable by Bus until the Kugti Village and planned to connect the road to Kartik Swami temple.

== Best time to visit ==
April–June and October–November

== Other information ==
Tundah Wild Life Sanctuary: Tundah Sanctuary is located around 59 km from Chamba, and is connected with Kugti Sanctuary in the east.

It plays host to a number of rare and endangered species of Indian wildlife, including Himalayan tahr, ibex, and pheasants. Also, it is home to musk deer.

Bharmour: This picturesque small town is bounded by high mountain ranges, and is known for its ancient temples and monuments.

Bharmour is the base for the Manimahesh Yatra, and there are a number of trekking trails that start from here. Apples grow here in plenty.
