= Minjar Mela =

Festival in Chamba, himachal pardesh

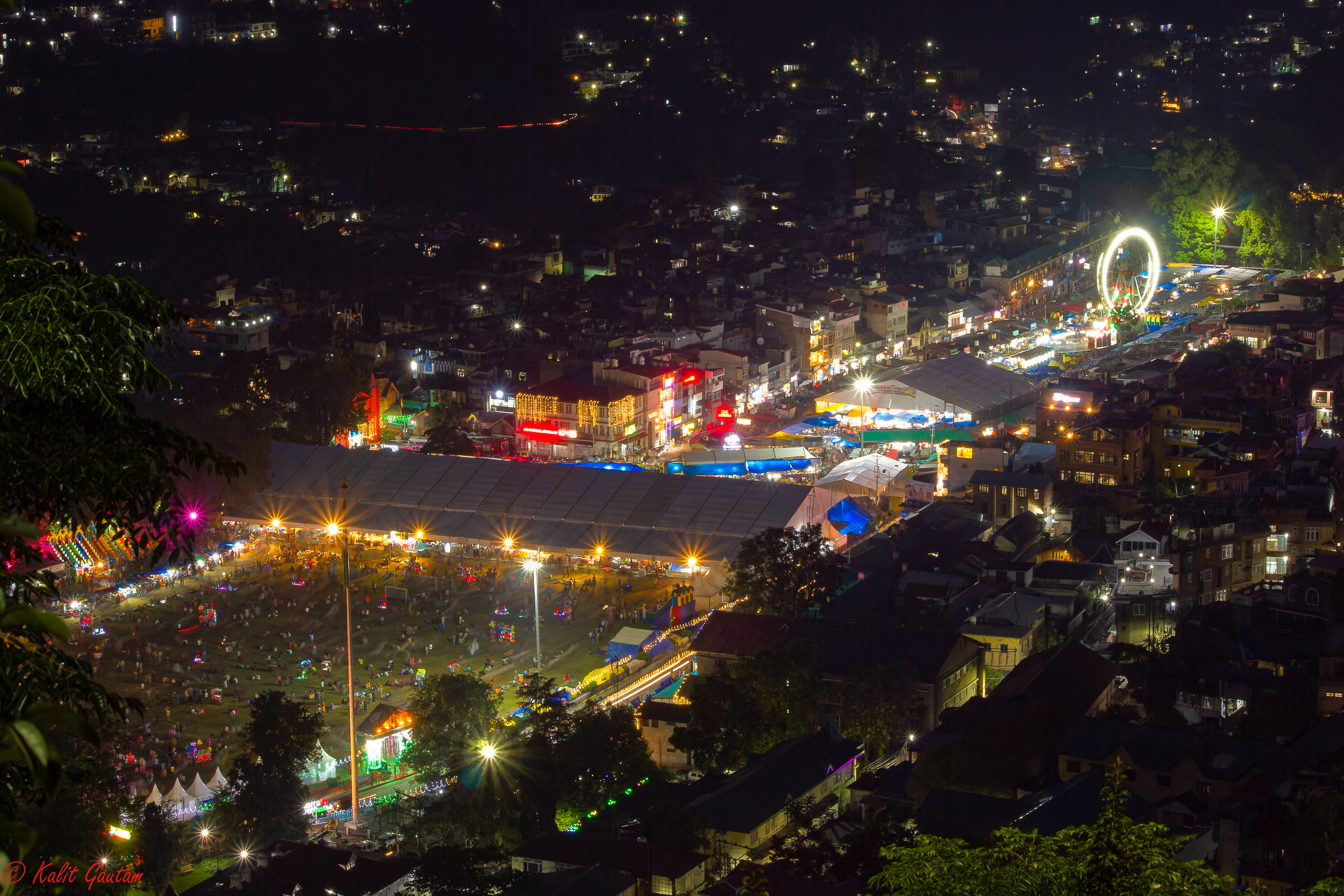
Minjar Mela as seen from Chamunda Temple

Minjar Mela, also known as the Minjar Fair, is an annual festival held in Chamba, a town in the Indian state of Himachal Pradesh. Recognized as an international fair by the state government, the event typically takes place in July and lasts for a week. It is associated with the maize harvest and involves rituals intended to ensure agricultural prosperity. A key feature of the festival is the Minjar procession, which includes a decorated chariot, folk performances, and participants in traditional dress.

== History ==
The history of Minjar Mela dates back several centuries and is closely associated with the town of Chamba in Himachal Pradesh, India. It is believed to have originated in the 10th century, and commemorates the victory of King Sahila Varma over the ruler of Kangra. The word "Minjar" refers to silk tassels worn by locals, which shimmer like maize blossoms in the sun.
