= Farid-ud-Din Baghdadi =

Kashmiri sufi saint

Shah Farid-ud-Din Baghdadi

Shah Sahib
- Born: Shah Mohammed Farid-ud-Din Baghdadi; Iraq
- Died: 1733; Kishtwar, Jammu and Kashmir
- Venerated in: Sunni Islam
- Major shrine: Kishtwar, Jammu and Kashmir
- Influenced: Aurangzeb, Shah Jahan
- Tradition or genre: Sufism (Sunni Islam)

Shah Mohammed Farid-ud-Din Baghdadi (died 1733 AD), also known by the honorary title Shah Sahib, sometimes spelled as Fareed-ud-Din, was a seventeenth century Iraqi Sufi saint. He is believed to have propagated Islam in the Chenab Valley of Jammu and Kashmir. He left for Hejaz and offered the Hajj at Mecca, and subsequently travelled through Egypt and Sindh. Prior to his propagation of Islam in the valley, he travelled through Agra and then reached Kishtwar where he spread Islam around 1075 Hijri, corresponding to 1664 AD. He was 75 at that time.

== Biography ==
His family relation go back Sayid Burhandin Baghdadi Kubrawi. He was a disciple of Mir Sayid Ali Hamadani. His father was named Syed Mustafa. Shah Fareed ud din (ra) had three sons, Shah Asrar-ud-Din, Shah Akhyar-ud-Din and Shah Anwar-ud-Din.

Farid-ud-Din travelled across multiple regions of the valley, particularly Kishtwar. He reached there along with his followers and two sons, and introduced Sufism, a branch of Islam. It is believed that Islam was already spread in the past by other Sufi saints and preachers, including Mir Sayyid Ali Hamadani, Nund Rishi and Zain-ul-Abedeen Rishi.

Before his arrival in the valley along with Dervish Muhammad, Yar Muhammad, Syed Baha Uddin Sa’ani and Shah Abdal, he visited Agra near Shah Jehan’s reign at the age of seventy-five.

After Islam was spread to the area, the ruler of Kishtwar, Raja Kirat Singh, is believed to have accepted Islam under the influence of Farid-ud-Din and thus the ruler became known by his Muslim name, Raja Tegh Muhammad Singh (whose famous poetry is inscribed in the shrine).

== Death and legacy ==
Farid-ud-Din died in 1733 AD in the Kishtwar area where a dargah was constructed by the local people or by state government. His Urs (death anniversary) is celebrated annually by Kashmiri people between 19 and 20 June. Nearly 50,000 devotees attend the Ziyarat complex (shrine of the saint) in the region. The shrine authorities display the saint's sword, clothes and stick he used throughout his life. He is buried next to his son in a tomb which stands in the center of town.
