= Chamba, Himachal Pradesh =

Town in the Himachal Pradesh, India

Chamba
- Town
- Chamba
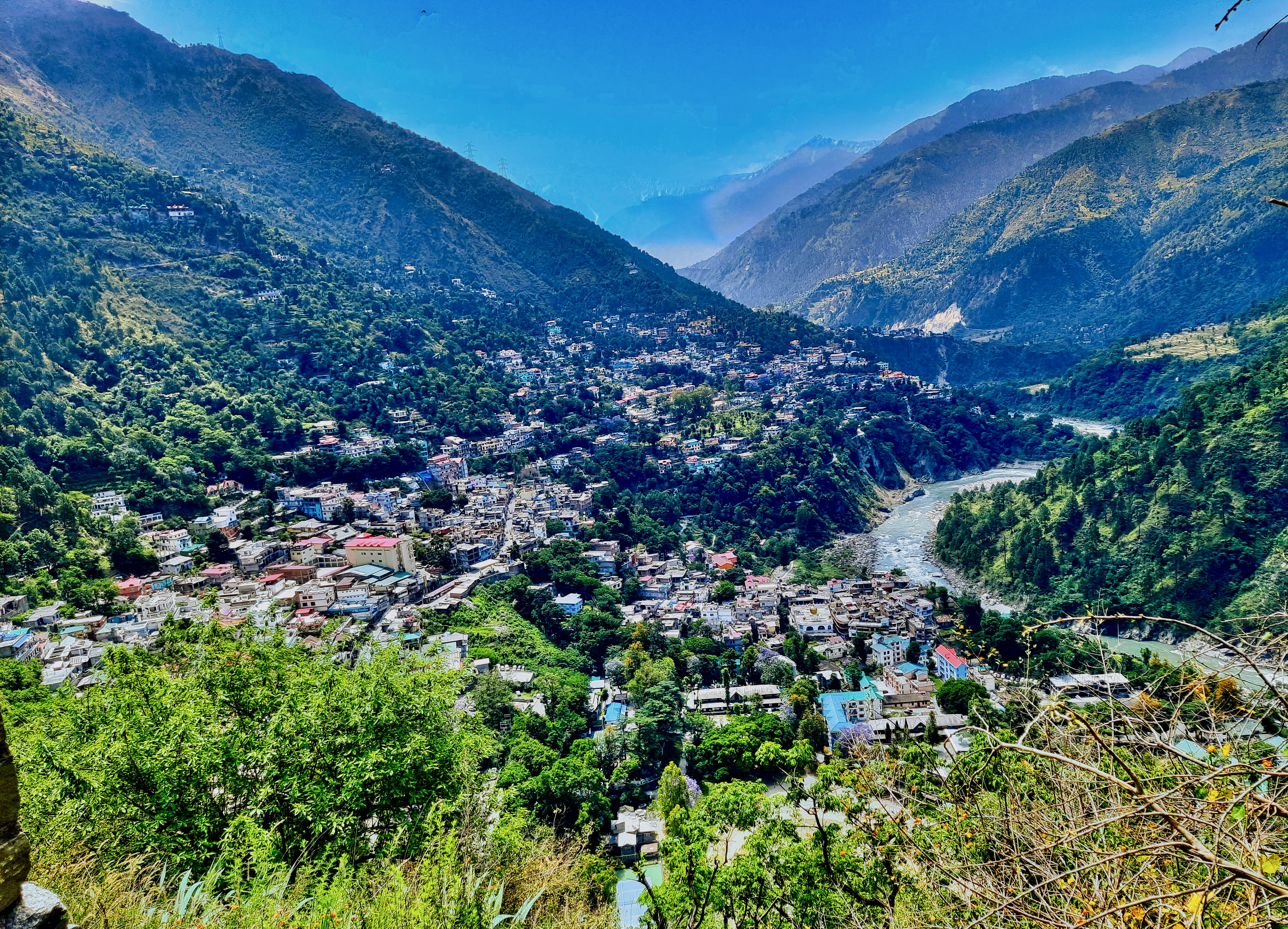
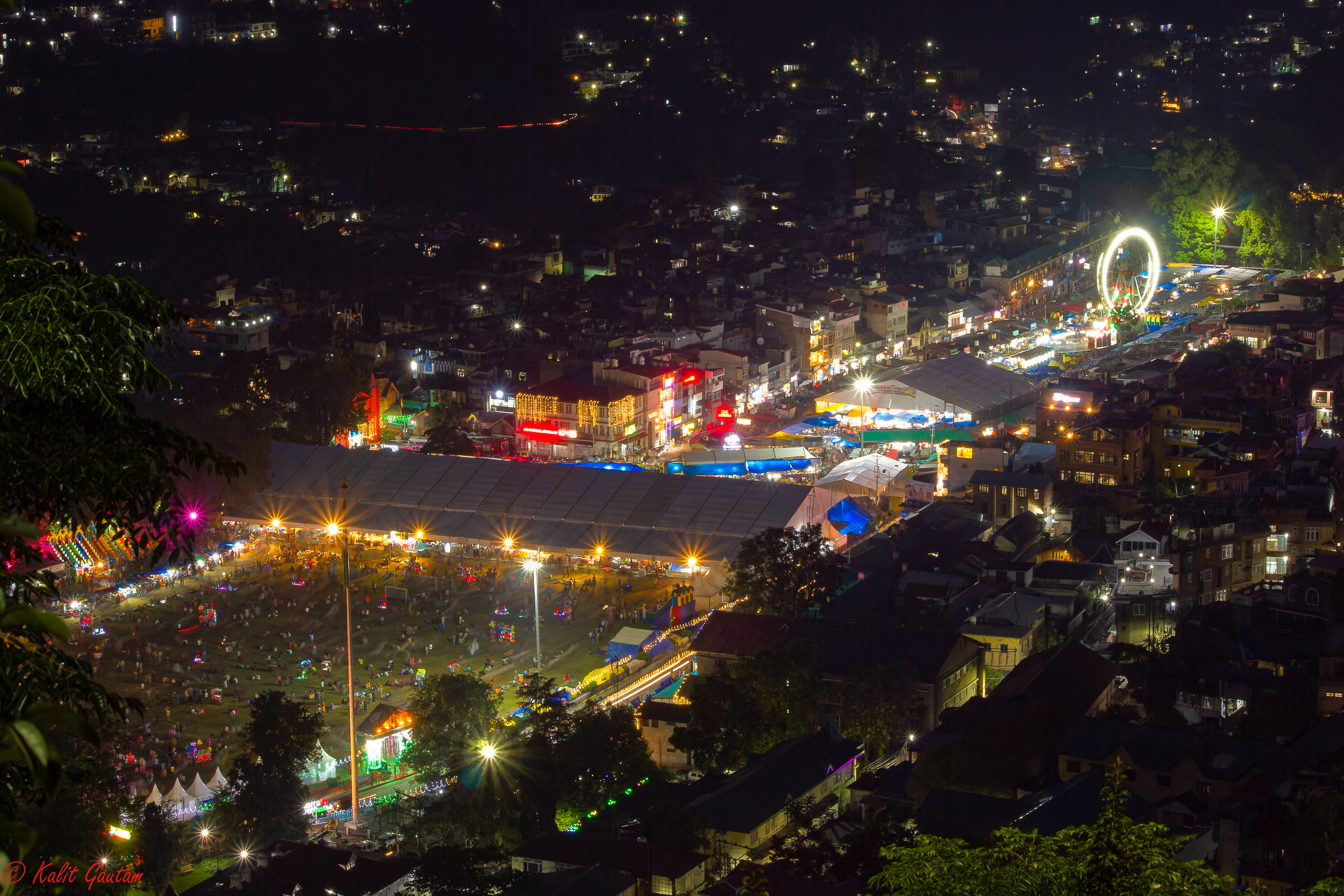
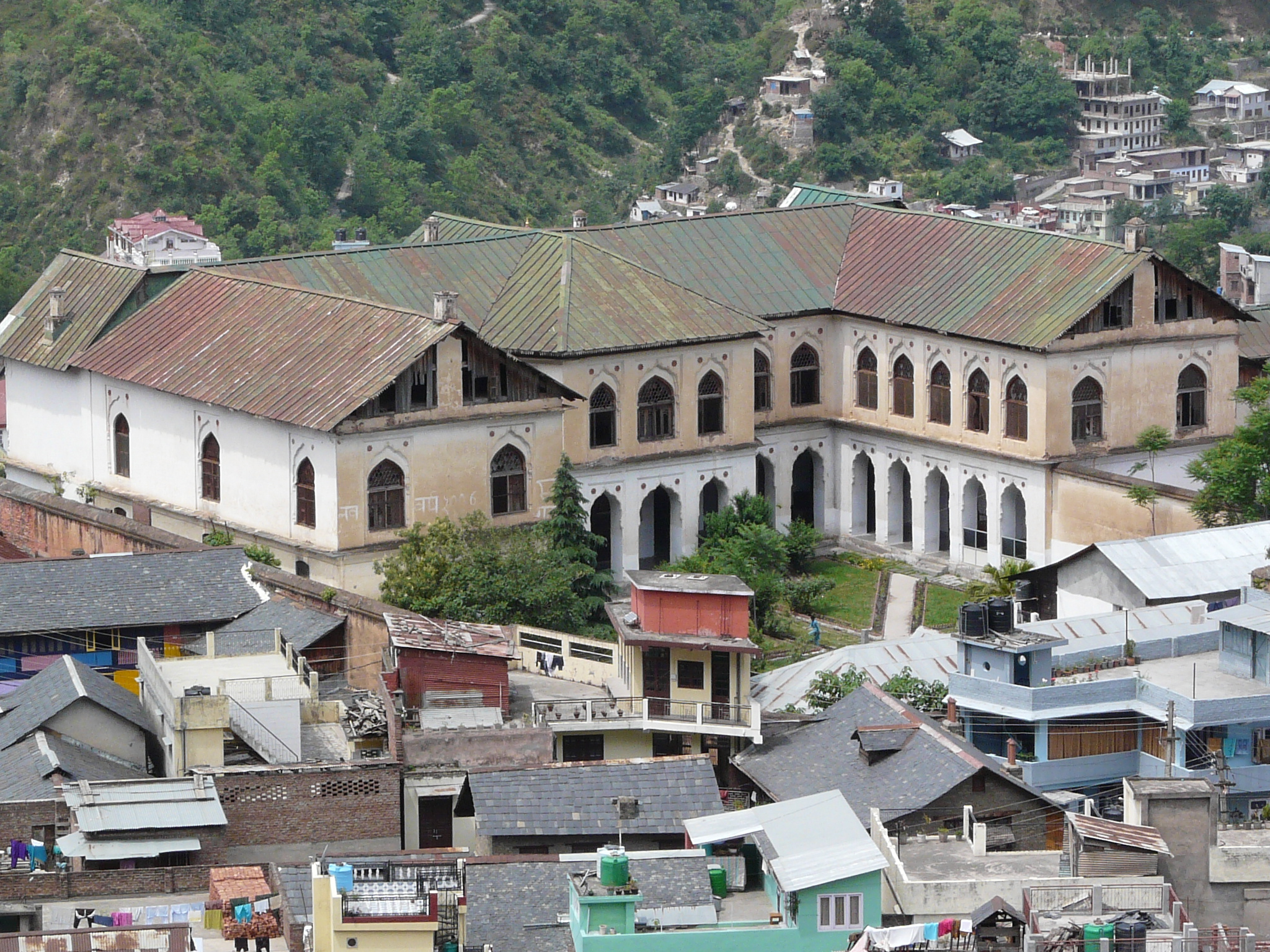
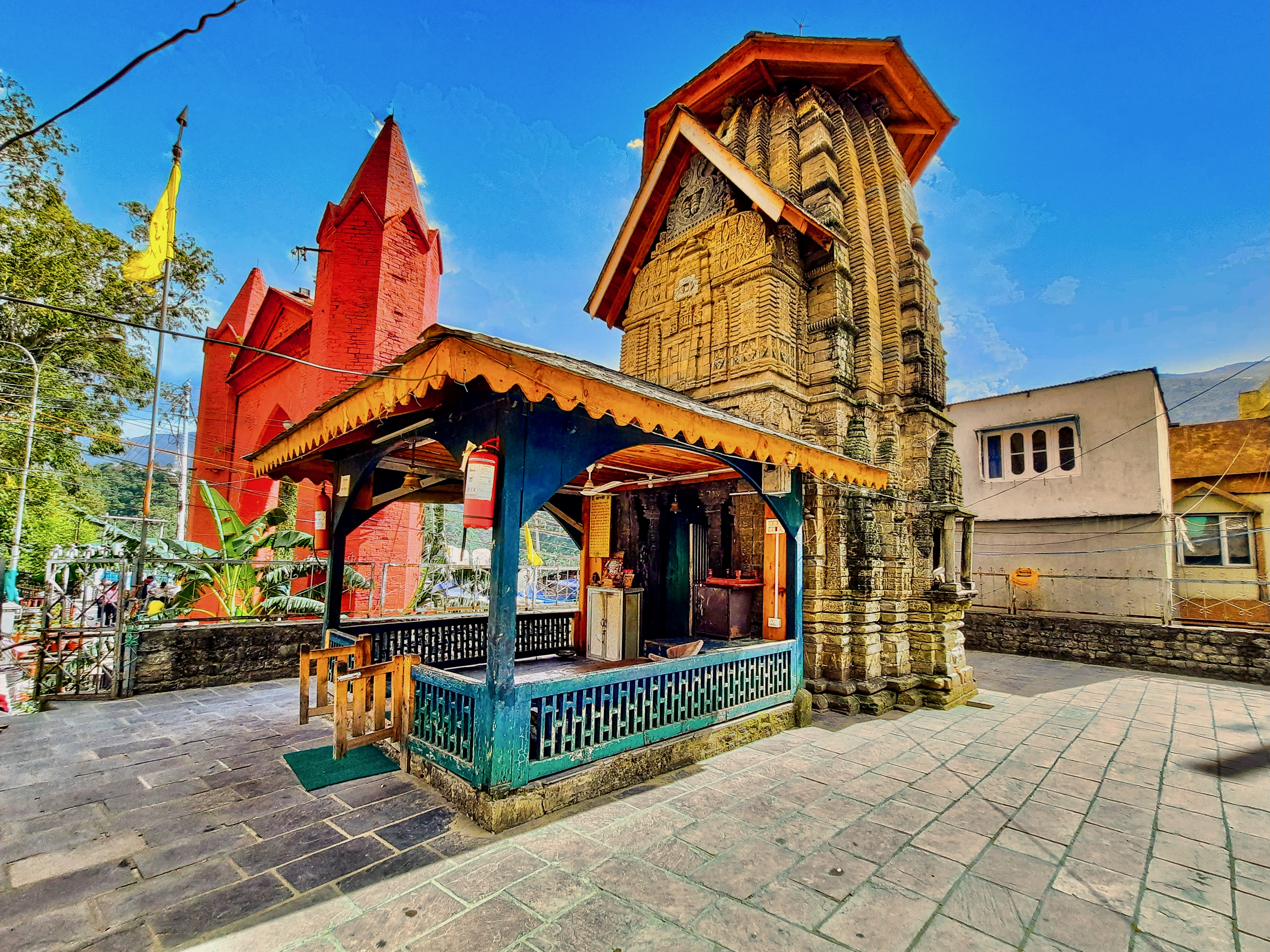
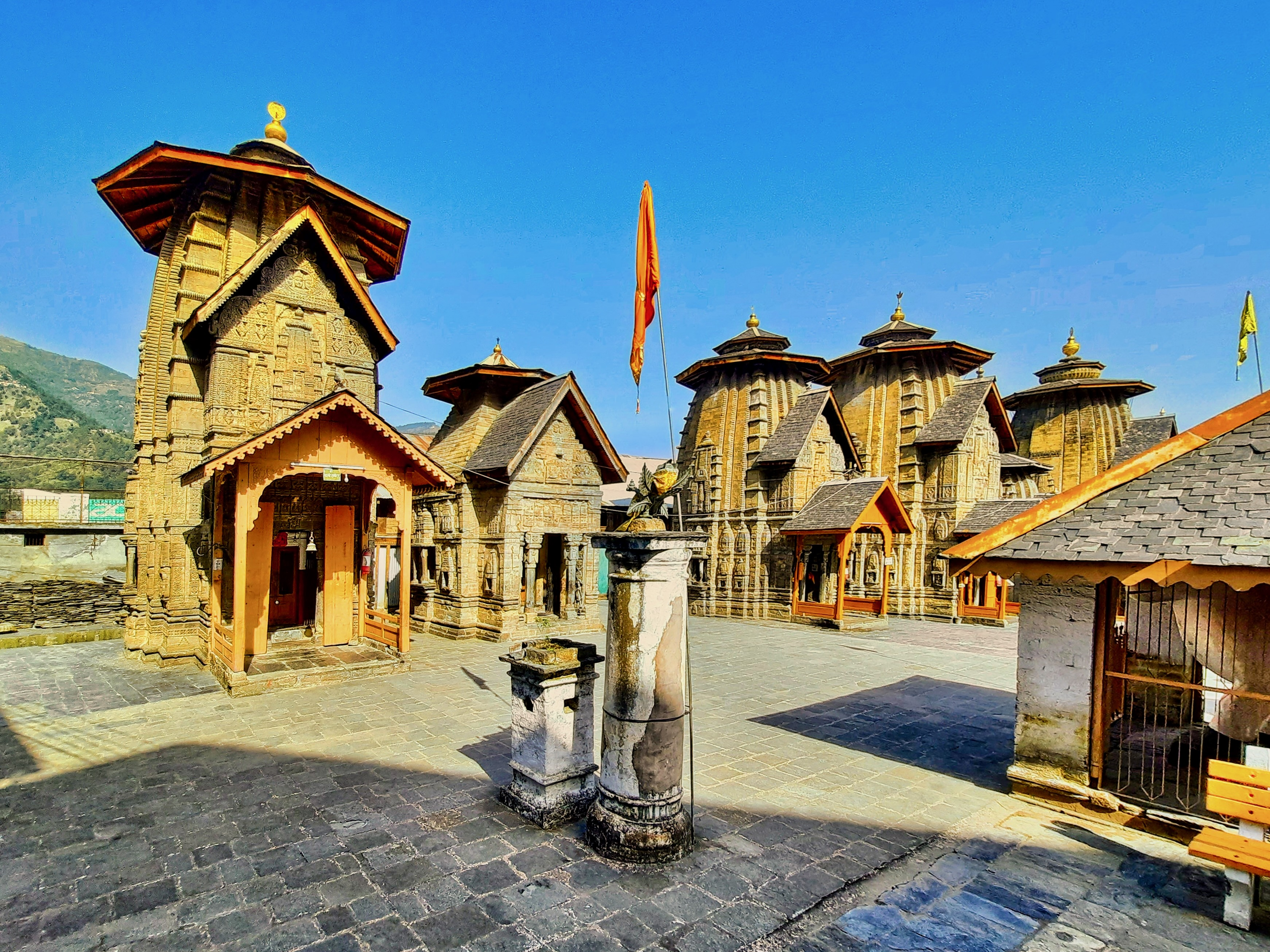
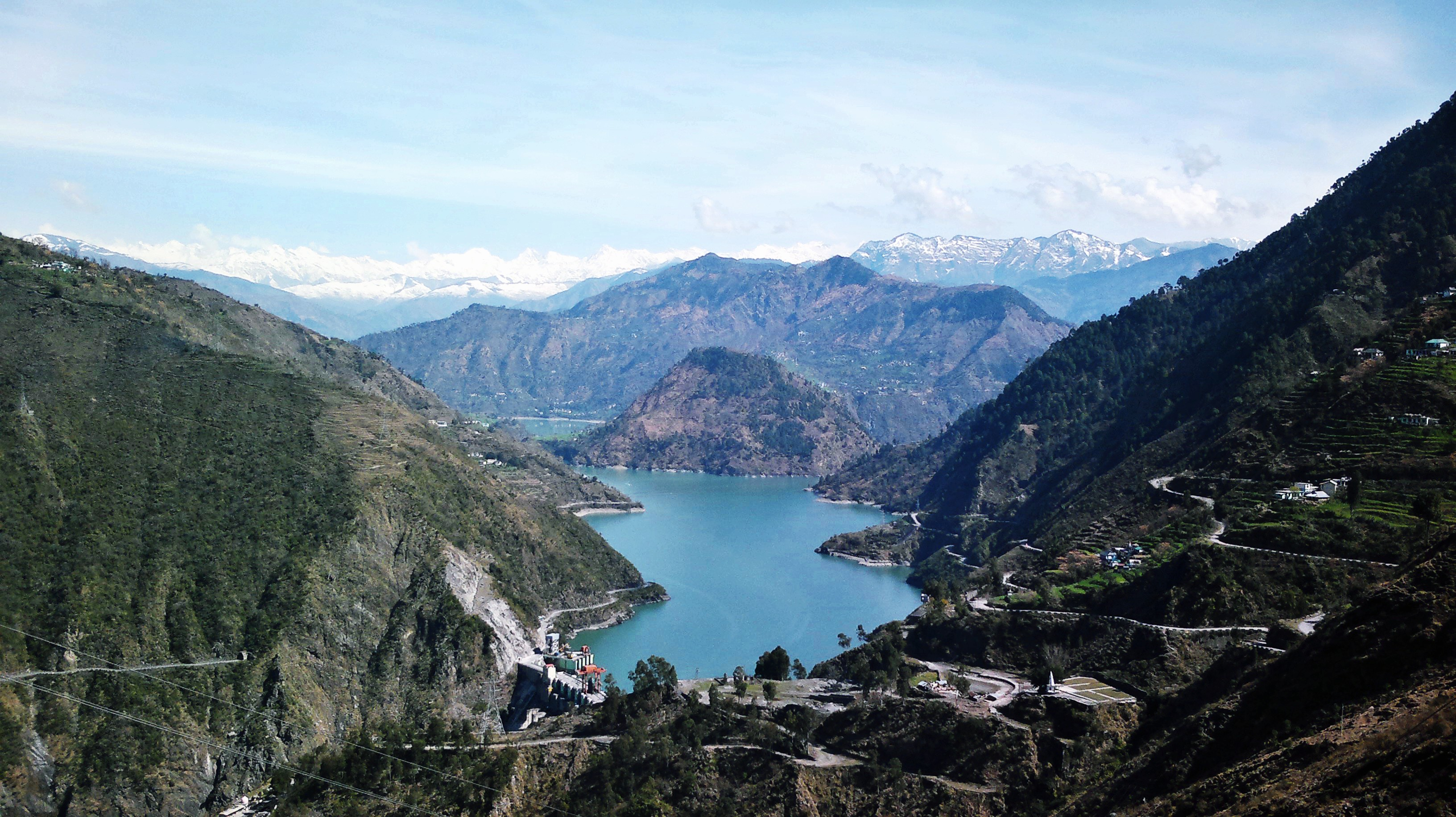
- From top, left to right: Chamba city panaroma from uphill, View of Minjar Mela at night, Old Palace of Chamba, Hari Rai Temple, Lakshmi Narayan group of Temples, Chamera lake

- Location within Himachal Pradesh Location within India Location within Asia
- Coordinates: 32°34′12″N 76°7′48″E
- Country: India
- State: Himachal Pradesh
- District: Chamba district
- Founded: around 920A.D.
- Elevation: 996 m (3,268 ft)

Population (2011)
  - Total: 19,933
  - Rank: 9 in HP

Languages
  - Official: Hindi
  - Native: Chambeali
- Time zone: UTC+5:30 (IST)
- Post code: 176310, 176314
- Area code: +91-18992-xxxxx
- Vehicle registration: HP-44, HP-45, HP-46, HP-47, HP-48, HP-57, HP-73, HP-81
- Website: hpchamba.nic.in

Chamba is a town in the Chamba district in the Indian state of Himachal Pradesh. According to the 2001 Indian census, Chamba has a population of 20,312. Located at an altitude of 1,006 metres (3,301 ft) above mean sea level, the town is situated on the banks of the Ravi River (a major tributary of the trans-Himalayan Indus River), at its confluence with the Sal River.

Though historical records date the history of the Chamba region to the Koli tribes in the 2nd century BC, the area was formally ruled by the Maru dynasty, starting with the Raju Maru from around 500 AD, ruling from the ancient capital of Bharmour, which is located 65 kilometres (40 mi) from the town of Chamba. In 920, Raja Sahil Varman (or Raja Sahil Verman) shifted the capital of the kingdom to Chamba, following the specific request of his daughter Champavati (Chamba was named after her). From the time of Raju Maru, 67 rajas of that dynasty ruled over Chamba until it finally merged with the Indian Union in April 1948 (although Chamba was under British suzerainty from 1846 to that time).

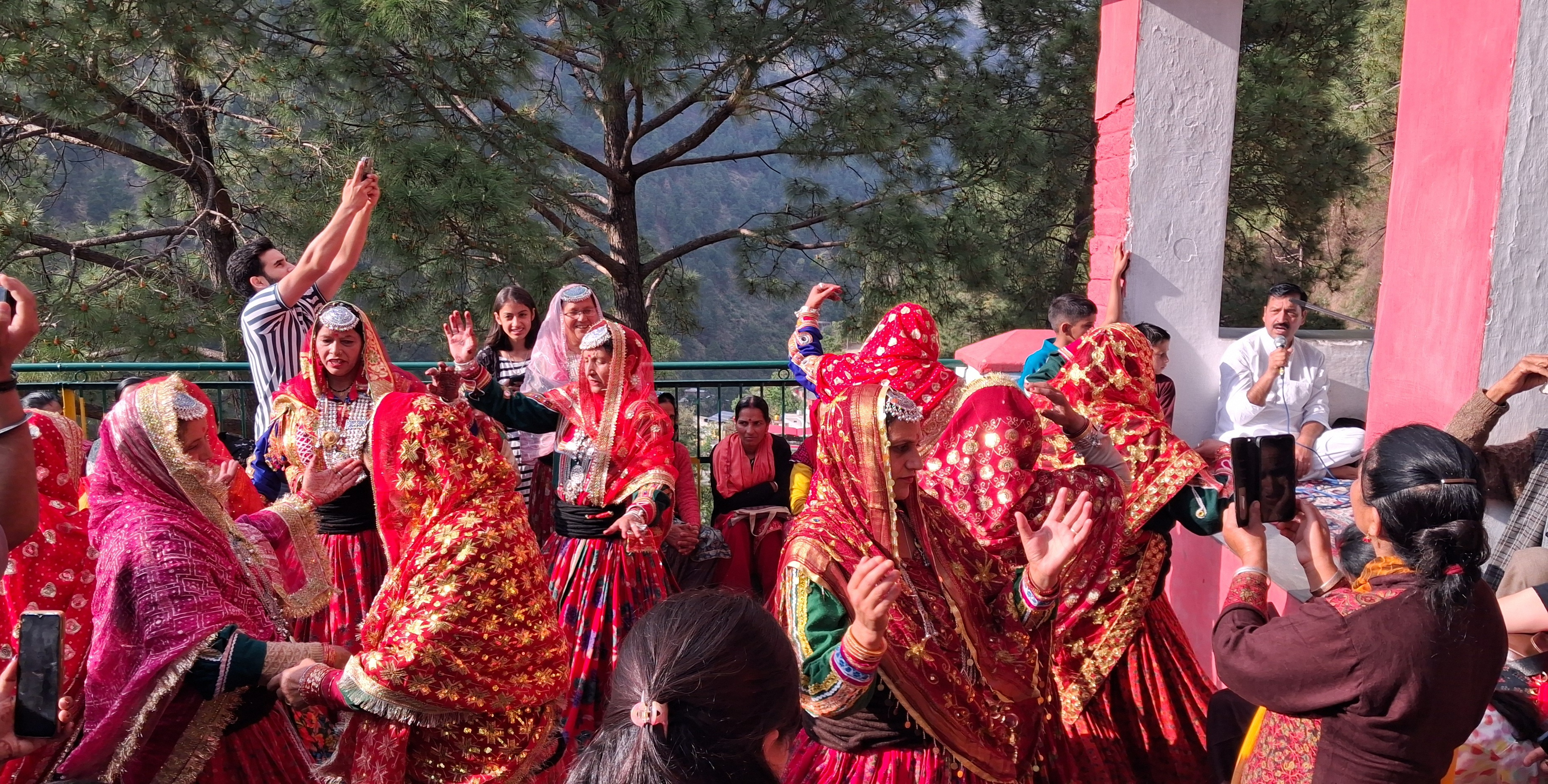
Gaddi women dancing at Suhi Mela

The town has numerous temples and palaces, and hosts two popular fairs, the Suhi Mata Mela and the Minjar Mela, which last for several days and feature music and dancing. Chamba is also well noted for its arts and crafts, particularly its Pahari paintings, which originated in the Hill Kingdoms of North India between the 17th and 19th century, and its handicrafts and textiles.

== History ==
=== Early history ===
Chamba has an ancient history, which is inseparable from that of the surrounding district of Chamba. The earliest rulers were the Kolian tribes. In the 2nd century BC the Khasas and Audumbaras were in power in the region. In the 4th century AD during the Gupta period, the Thakurs and Ranas ruled. From the 7th century, the Gurjara-Pratiharas or Rajput dynasty came into power.

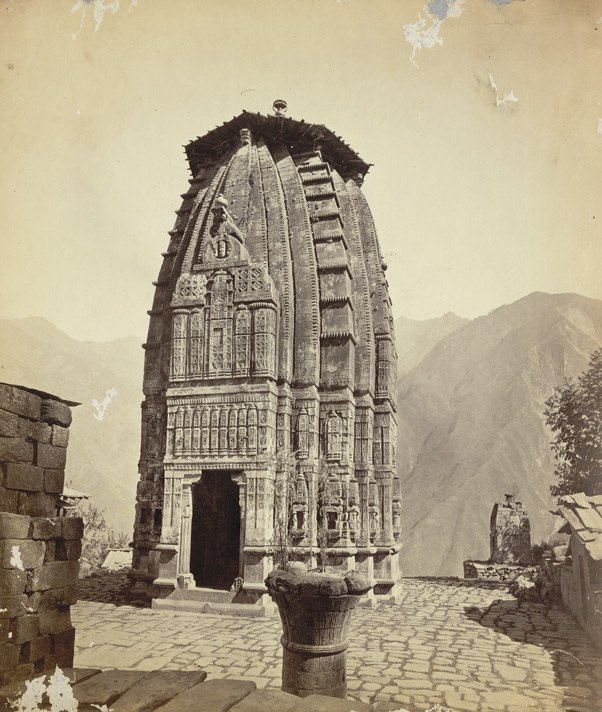
Ancient Mandir Narasimha Temple, Bharmaur, the ancient capital of the district (1875).

The recorded history of the Rajput rulers is traced to an eminent individual named Maru who is said to have moved to northwest India from Kalpagrama, around 500 AD. He founded his capital in the Budhal river valley at a place called Brahmapura, which later became known as Bharmaur. Bharmaur is situated 75 kilometres (47 mi) to the east of the present day Chamba town. For three hundred years, kings of Rajput Dynasty ruled from their capital in Bharmour.

However, in 920, Raja Sahil Varman (or Raja Sahila Verman), King of Bharmour, shifted his capital from Bharmour to a more centrally located plateau in the lower Ravi valley, and named the city Champavati, after his daughter. There is some variation in the story to how exactly this transition came about in the historical records of Chamba. One version tells how Varman, who, after being childless for a significant period, had ten sons and a daughter, named "Champavati". It was Champavati who urged her father to build a new capital town in the valley. However, obstacles stood in the way of relocating his capital, given that the king had previously granted the land in the modern Chamba vicinity to the Kanwan Brahmins. A solution was found in the form of offering a gift of eight copper coins called chaklis on the occasion of every marriage that took place in the Brahmin family, if they would agree to surrender their land to pave the way for the new capital. With the land thus obtained, the new capital was built and named Champa after Chamapavati, the King's daughter, which, over the years, was simply shortened to "Chamba'.

A variation of this origin of Chamba is that it originated as a hermitage which Champavati, a devout Hindu, used to frequent. The king, being suspicious of his daughter's fidelity, one day investigated and followed her to the hermitage, but surprisingly he found neither his daughter nor the hermit there. Suddenly he was said to have heard a voice which informed him that his suspicions were ill-founded, admonishing him and informing him that his daughter had been taken away from him permanently as a punishment for his lack of trust in her morals. The King, fully chastened, sought redemption for his sin by expanding the hermitage into a temple, named in his daughter's honour and built a city around the temple. Today this temple, called the Champavati Temple, belongs to the Royal family and the King's daughter is venerated as a goddess. Every year, since 935, the Minjar festival or fair has been held. It lasts for 21 days, coinciding with the first day of Baisakhi.

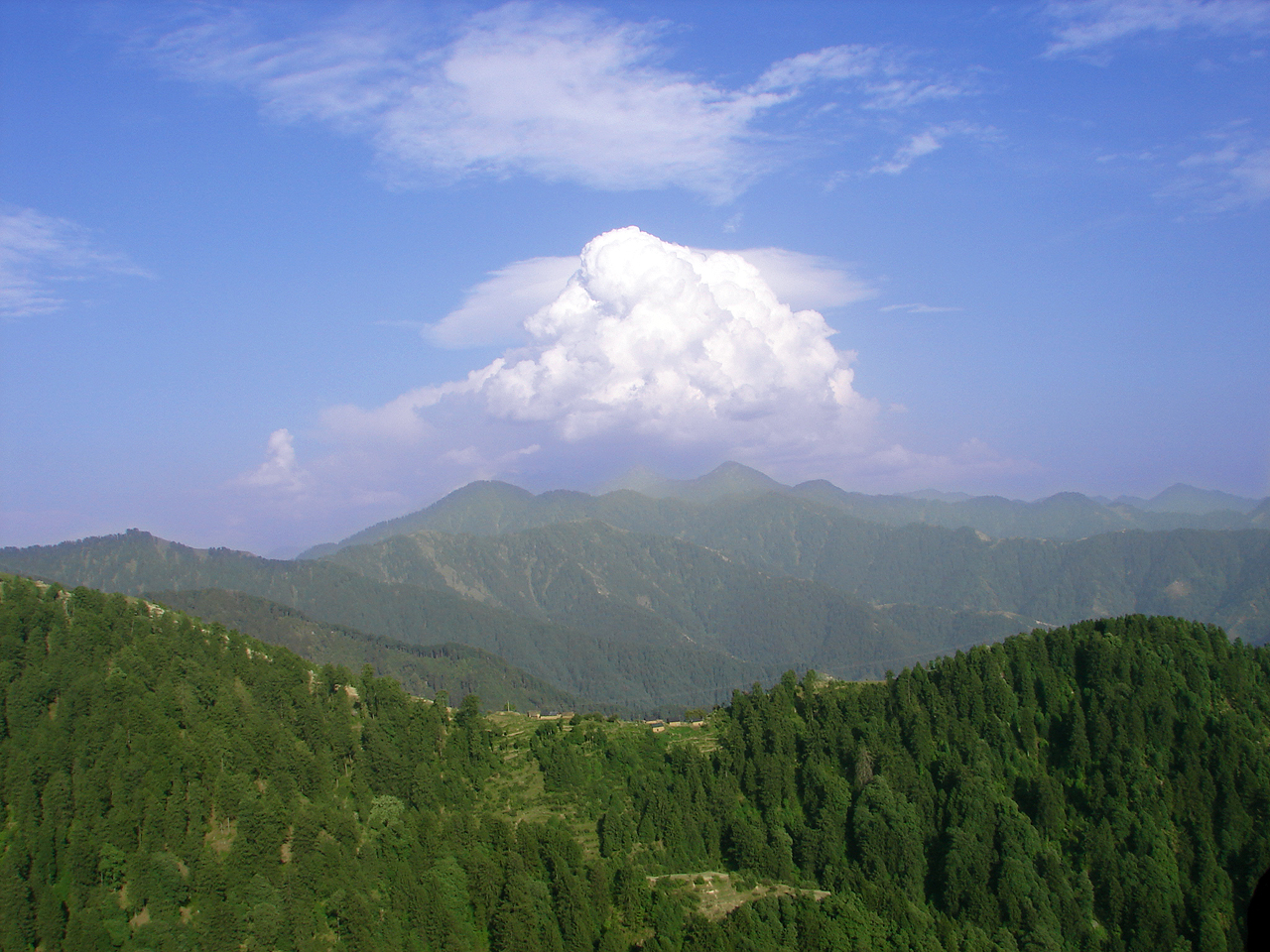
The remoteness and ruggedness of the Ravi River valley secured Chamba from successful invasions for around 1,000 years.

Since Raja Sahil Varman, the dynasty ruled without successful invasion for around a millennium, until the British gained power. The isolation of the town and its rugged hilly terrain is believed to have been a contributing factor to this unusual state of security. Later, Mughal emperors Akbar and Aurangzeb did attempt to annexe Chamba but were unsuccessful in subjugating this territory into their kingdoms. Raja Prithvi Singh (1641-1664 AD), who was on amiable terms with Emperor Shahjahan was instrumental in introducing the court lifestyles of the Mughals.

=== Modern history ===
In 1806, the combined forces of Gurkhas and local hills chiefs attacked the forces of Raja Sansar Chand in the battle and forced a crushing defeat on him along with family took shelter in the Kangra Fort. The Gurkhas sieged the Kangra fort and ruthlessly looted the area between the fort of Kangra and Mahal Mohrian and virtually destroyed the villages. The siege of the fort continued for three years. In 1809, Raja Ranjit Singh, the Sikh ruler of Lahore, on the request of Sansar Chand, waged war against the Gurkhas and defeated them. But Sansar Chand had to pay a heavy price whereby he had to lose Kangra fort and 66 villages to the Sikhs. Ranjit Singh controlled the region and had even placed a garrison at Chamba, forced the hill states to pay tribute to them. Ranjit Singh deposed the hill princes, including the more powerful Kangra ruler, Sansar Chand Katoch, but spared Chamba, given that the Wazir Nathu of Chamba had been important as an ambassador in negotiations with Katoch in 1809 and had saved his life in 1817 by succumbing his horse to King Singh to escape during a winter campaign in Kashmir.

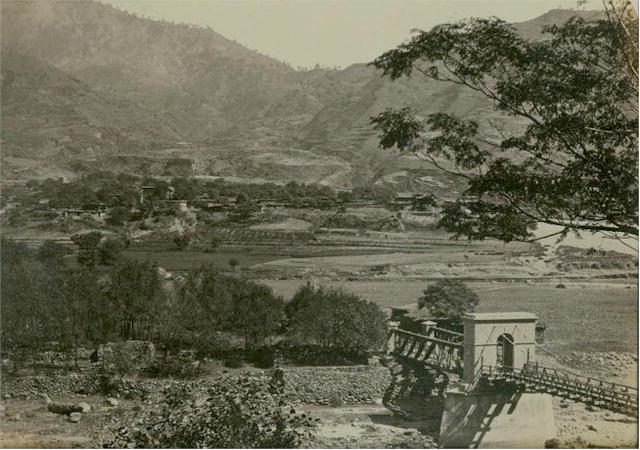
The Chamba Valley, c. 1865

In 1845, the Sikh army invaded the British territory. The result was disastrous, with the British defeating the army, leaving Chamba in a poor position. Wazir Bagha of Chamba was important in negotiations in its aftermath, and the Rajas of Chamba, on the advice of Bagha, agreed to the British suzerainty as part of Jammu and Kashmir in favour of an annuity of Rs 12,000. The Treaty of Lahore was signed in 1846, in which the Rajas agreed to cede the territory of Chamba district. From then on, relations with the British were cordial, and all of the Rajas of Chamba under British rule, Sri Singh, Gopal Singh, Sham Singh, Bhuri Singh, Ram Singh, and Laxman Singh, were on good terms with the British army officers.

Many progressive reforms and developments were made in Chamba under the British. In 1863, the first post office was established in Chamba as well as a daily mail service and a primary school. In December 1866, a hospital was opened by Doctor Elmslie of the Kashmir Medical Mission. In the late 1860s two new roads to Dalhousie via Kolri and Khajiar were built. Gopal Singh, who ruled from 1870 to 1873, after abdicating, was responsible for building the grand Jandarighat Palace as his summer residence.

After India became an independent nation in August 1947, the princely state of Chamba finally merged with India on 15 April 1948 along with the other princedoms of Mandi-Suket State, Sirmour State and all of those in the Shimla hills.

== Geography and climate ==
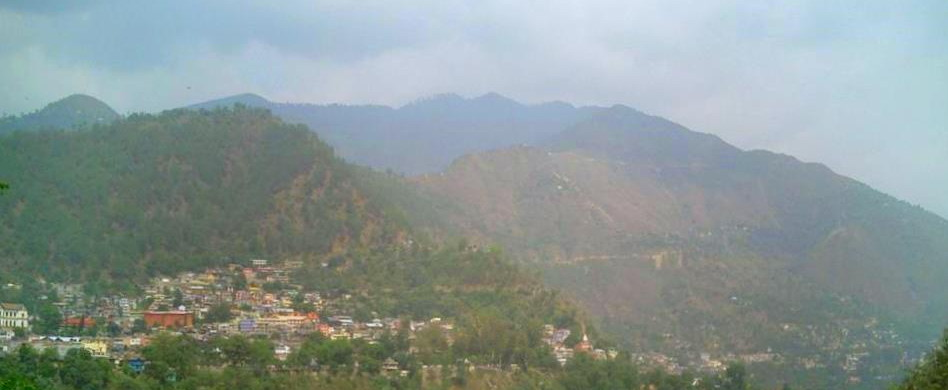
Panorama of the upper part of the town and mountains surrounding it

Chamba is the headquarters of the Chamba district, bordered by Kishtwar and Doda districts of Jammu region in (union territory) of Jammu and Kashmir to the north-west and in the west Ladakh and Lahaul and Bara Banghal to the north-east and east, Kangra to the south-east and Pathankot district of Punjab to the south. It has an average elevation of 1,006 metres (3,301 ft).

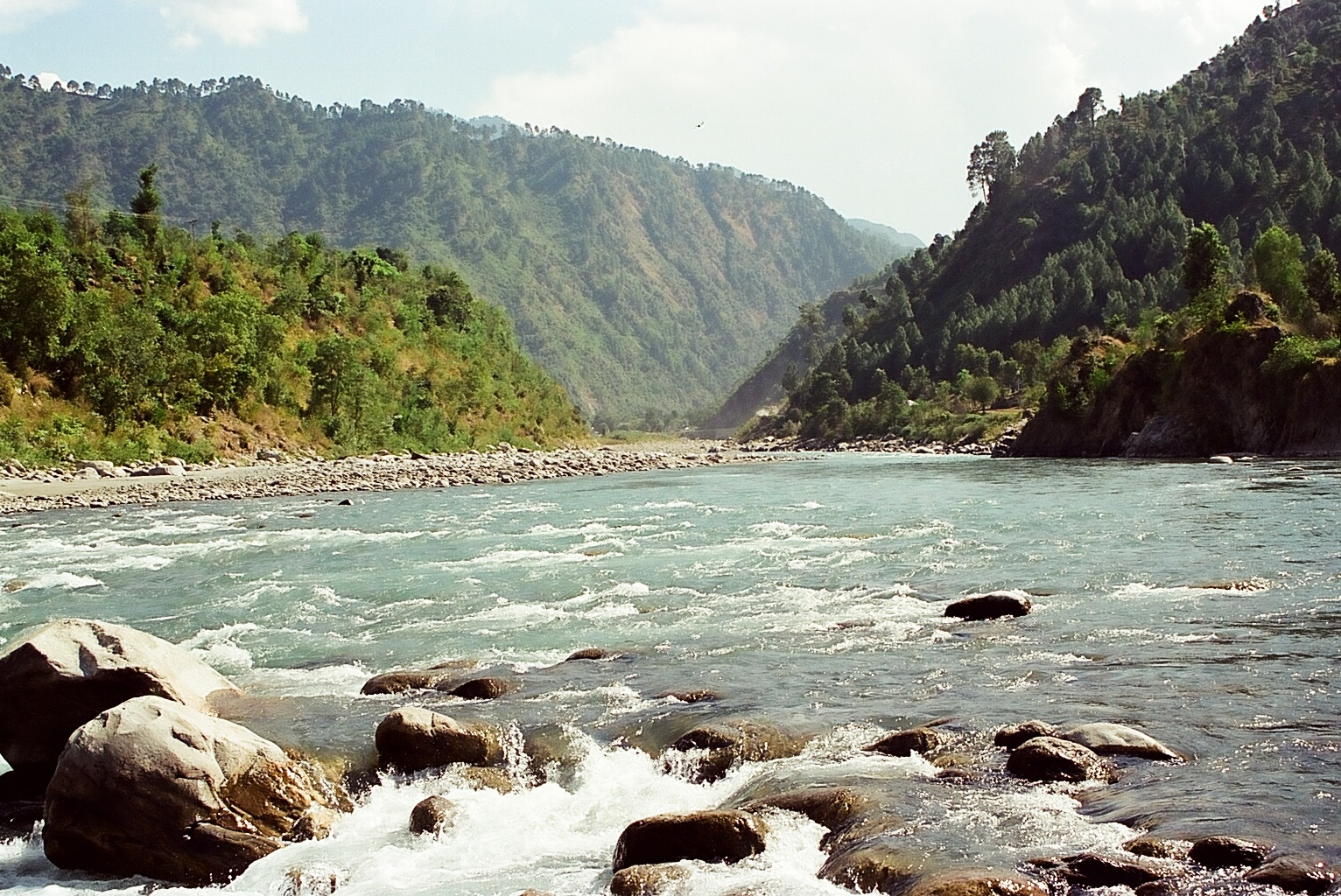
The Ravi River flowing through Chamba

The town, the district and the valley where the town is located, share the name of Chamba. The town of Chamba is located at the junction of Ravi River and its tributary, the Sal River, with the Shah Madar hill forming the backdrop on its eastern side. The Ravi flows in east-west direction forming deep canyons. During the spring and summer months, the levels of the river rise significantly from snow melt and pose a flooding risk. Record levels were experienced in early July 2005, when the National Hydroelectric Power Corporation was forced to shut down the power generation on its 300-MW Chamera Power Station.

Located on the right bank of the Ravi river valley, built on successive flat terraces, the town is bounded topographically by the Dhauladhar and Pir Panjal ranges, south of the inner Himalayas. Chamba, despite its hill location, is well connected by road to the rest of the state and country, including Shimla, Delhi and Chandigarh along several routes. The nearest broad gauge railway stations are at Chakki Bank and Pathankot, the latter of which is 120 kilometres (75 mi) away by road.

The temperatures in summer vary between 38 °C (100 °F) and 15 °C (59 °F) and in winter: 15 °C (59 °F) and 0 °C (32 °F). The maximum temperature recorded in summer is 40.6 °C (105.1 °F) and the minimum temperature in winter is −1 °C (30 °F). Climatically March to June is said to be the best period to visit Chamba, which is a well known hill station. The average annual rainfall in the town is 785.84 millimetres (30.939 in).

Climate data for Chamba, Himachal Pradesh (1961–1990, rainfall 1951–2000)
Month	Jan	Feb	Mar	Apr	May	Jun	Jul	Aug	Sep	Oct	Nov	Dec	Year
Record high °C (°F)	25.3 (77.5)	26.2 (79.2)	29.9 (85.8)	38.5 (101.3)	42.3 (108.1)	38.6 (101.5)	39.5 (103.1)	36.6 (97.9)	35.2 (95.4)	32.6 (90.7)	28.3 (82.9)	25.0 (77.0)	42.3 (108.1)
Mean daily maximum °C (°F)	17.9 (64.2)	20.5 (68.9)	22.9 (73.2)	28.8 (83.8)	33.5 (92.3)	32.3 (90.1)	32.6 (90.7)	30.7 (87.3)	29.2 (84.6)	28.2 (82.8)	23.4 (74.1)	19.7 (67.5)	26.6 (79.9)
Mean daily minimum °C (°F)	4.2 (39.6)	5.6 (42.1)	7.3 (45.1)	13.2 (55.8)	17.3 (63.1)	20.5 (68.9)	21.5 (70.7)	21.1 (70.0)	18.5 (65.3)	13.7 (56.7)	8.9 (48.0)	5.7 (42.3)	13.1 (55.6)
Record low °C (°F)	0.1 (32.2)	0.4 (32.7)	2.1 (35.8)	0.0 (32.0)	6.0 (42.8)	8.5 (47.3)	8.0 (46.4)	10.5 (50.9)	5.0 (41.0)	1.0 (33.8)	0.5 (32.9)	0.0 (32.0)	0.0 (32.0)
Average rainfall mm (inches)	73.6 (2.90)	117.1 (4.61)	159.8 (6.29)	100.0 (3.94)	88.4 (3.48)	103.5 (4.07)	169.2 (6.66)	168.3 (6.63)	101.7 (4.00)	32.7 (1.29)	25.8 (1.02)	50.8 (2.00)	1,190.9 (46.89)
Average rainy days (≥ 2.5 mm)	5.0	6.0	7.6	5.5	5.5	6.6	10.8	10.0	4.9	2.2	1.9	3.0	69.0
Average relative humidity (%) (at 17:30 IST)	77	75	78	67	58	62	78	81	80	73	72	75	73
Source: India Meteorological Department

== Demographics ==
As of 2001 India census, Chamba had a population of 20,312. Males constituted 52% of the population and females 48%. Chamba has an average literacy rate of 81%, higher than the national average of 59.5%; with a male literacy of 85% and female literacy of 77%. The administrative language is Hindi, whereas the locally spoken language is Chambeali. There are some speakers of Punjabi and Pashto, mostly of Sikh and Hindu descent, Those came here after partition in 1947.

Away from the urban centre, the tribal people of Chamba (popularly known as Chambial) are divided into two major groups; the Gujjars and the Gaddis. The Gujjars, mainly nomads, came to Chamba across the state border from Jammu and Kashmir along the trade routes. They belong to nomadic herdsmen of the Muslim community, and travel to lowland Punjab in the autumn with their livestock to avoid the harsh winter of the Chamba hills. Their features are Turkic and have a distinct language known as Gojri and distinct culture aloof from the main town.

The Gaddis comprise several ethnic groups; namely the Brahmans, Rajputs, Thakurs, Rathis and the Khatris, who form the majority. They are agricultural peoples, and the name "Gaddi" means "shepherd". They mainly inhabit an area of the Chamba district in the Dhaula Dhar mountains, known as Brahmaur Wazarat or "Gadaran", located between Chamba and Kangra. "Gadar" means sheep, so their land is informally referred to as "Gadaran", literally meaning "sheep country". They are believed to have come to Chamba in the 10th century, although an influx of Gaddi people migrated to Chamba from Lahore in the 18th century, during the Mughal Empire. They are said to practice animism combined with the worship of Lord Shiva.

== Administration ==
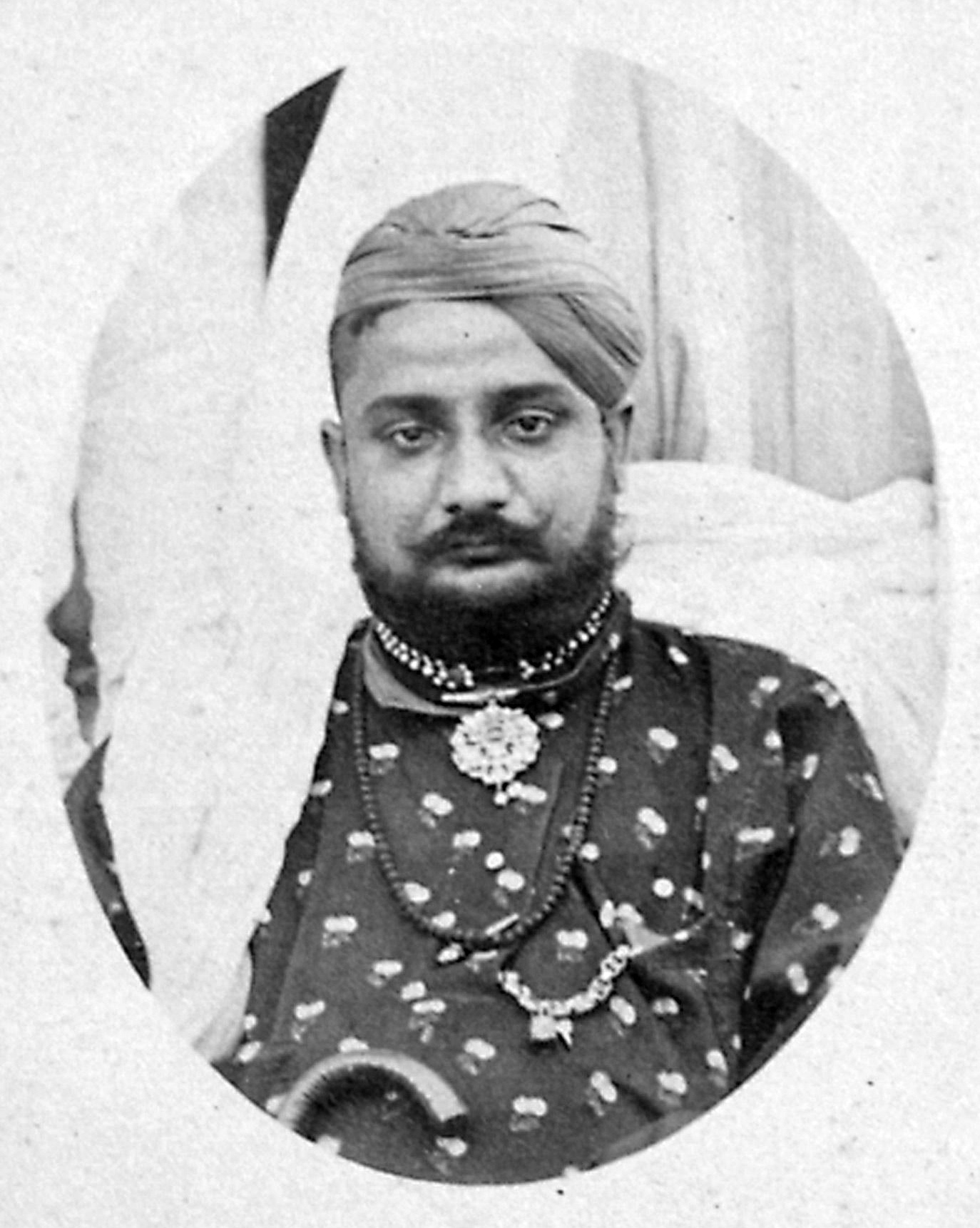
Gopal Singh, Raja of Chamba (ruled 1870–1873)

There have been a total of 67 rajas who have ruled Chamba district since the Principality of Bharmour was established in the 6th century, beginning with Raja Maru. Indeed, it is believed to have been an isolated case in the history of India that the Chamba kingdom remained independent without interference for over 1000 years. Before Raja Sahila Varman, however, the territorial extent of the state of Chamba was ill-defined and was more a loosely based territory, marked by disunity. Chamba state was run by Ranas, petty rulers who were allocated locally governed areas known as "fiefdoms" and treated them as their own virtually independent kingdoms. It wasn't until the reign of Sahila Varman that these Raja lords were subjugated and the district of Chamba was consolidated formally as a unified entity. The rajas of the Chamba Kingdom, ruling from the capital in Chamba divided the kingdom into 5 mandalas, later termed wazarats. These sub-territories consisted of Chamba, Bharmour, Bhatti, Churah and Pangi.

== Landmarks and cityscape ==
The city layout can be distinctly demarcated into two zones; namely the 'Old Town' before the British introduced their urban architectural styles and the British period of contemporary monuments, bridges and buildings. In a study of the architecture of Chamba, instituted by the Indian National Trust for Art and Cultural Heritage (INTACH), with the objective of conserving and restoring individual heritage buildings, it has been observed that the urban architecture of Chamba evolved under three distinct phases. The first phase from 930, dating from the Rajput dynasty establishing the capital at Chamba until 1846, the second phase during the British period; and the third phase constituting the post independent period after its merger with the Indian Union in April 1948.

=== Monuments built prior to 1846 ===
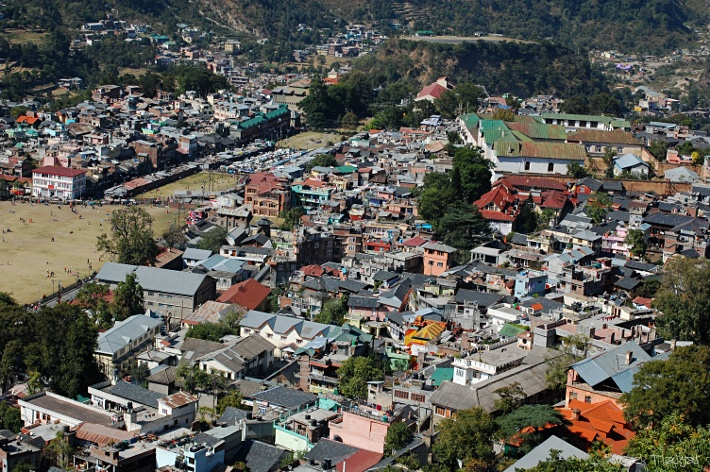
View of Chamba.

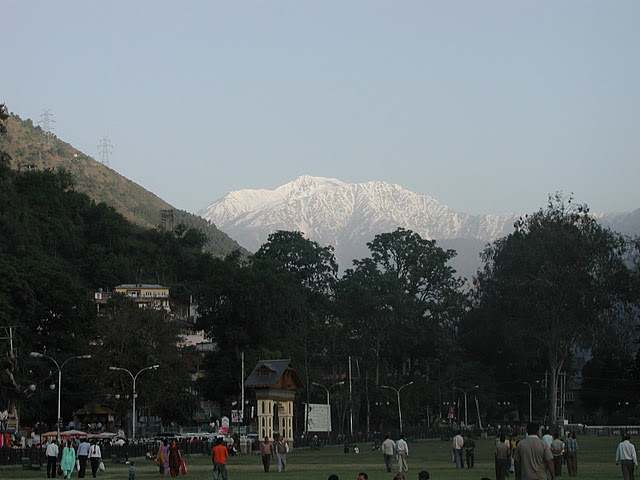
Chamba Town.

Buildings in Chamba were traditionally constructed using local materials. Buildings were made out of dry stone masonry, with the walls and floors of the older houses plastered with a concoction of clay and cow dung. Thick wooden beams were used to support the walls, paying attention to durability and to withstand earthquakes, and wooden cantilever construction was often used to support the verandas. The staircases and doors were made from wood, with the doors often decorated in religious reliefs and flanked by two lamps to light it at night. Before the arrival of the British, who introduced slate roofs to Chamba, roofs were covered with planks, coated in clay. Few of these houses remain today, although a number still have wood-clay roofs in villages in the suburbs.

The old heritage monuments, which are palaces and temples are located in the old town (east of the Chaugans), on the lower slopes of Shah Madar hill. They were built in the lower valley where the two rivers and steep thickly forested hillsides provided a strong defence. Located here is the 10th-century Champavati Temple, said to have marked the birth of the town, the Lakshmi Narayan group of temples (built from 10th-19th century), the 10th-century Sita Ram Temple, Bansi Gopal temple, Kharura Mohalla and Hari Rai temple, the 11th century Sui Mata Temple and Chamunda Devi Temple, and the Akhand Chandi palace, overlooking the Chaugan, which has since been converted into a college. Additions were made to the palace in the form of the Zenana Mahal and the Rang Mahal in the 18th century. The temples built in Chamba demonstrate a strong Kashmiri influence with their stone temple architecture and temple iconography. Given their age however, only their unicellular layout with fluted pillars has been retained.

==== Champavati Temple ====
This temple was built by Raja Sahil Varman in memory of his daughter Champavati. The temple, located near the Police Post and the Treasury building, is built in the Shikhara style, with intricate stone carvings. It has a wheel roof and is as large as the Laxmi Narayan Temple. An idol of the goddess Mahishasuramardini (Durga) is worshipped in the temple. The walls of the temple are full of exquisite stone sculptures. On account of its historical and archaeological importance, the temple is maintained by the Archaeological Survey of India. Champavati Temple, located in the heart of the city of Chamba, is a pilgrim destination for many Hindus. It is named after Champavati, the daughter of King Sahil Varman, the founder of the temple. The temple holds great historical and religious relevance for many Hindus. Champavati Temple enshrines an idol of Goddess Mahisasuramardini, the avatar of Goddess Durga. According to the legend, the daughter of King Sahil Varman Champavati was a religious person and used to visit temples and sadhu's ashrams regularly.

The king, after getting suspicious of her actions, once followed her to a sadhu's place, with a dagger in his cloak. Once he reached the ashram, he found that there was no one inside. To his surprise, both the sadhu and his daughter Champavati had vanished. When he was about to return, he heard a voice saying that his daughter had been taken away as a punishment for his suspicion. The voice also asked him to build a temple, in the name of his daughter Champavati, if he wanted to avoid further familial calamities.

The king ordered the construction of the Champavati Temple. Now, the temple is under the Archaeological Survey of India, for its historical and archaeological importance. The major attraction of the temple is its Shikhara style architecture. Stone carved walls, full of sculptures, make the temple an attractive tourist spot. The temple has a large wheel on the rooftop, which adores it and makes it a distinguished temple in North India. The Champavati Temple is often compared with Laxmi Narayan Temple, in its grandeur.

==== Lakshmi Narayan temples ====
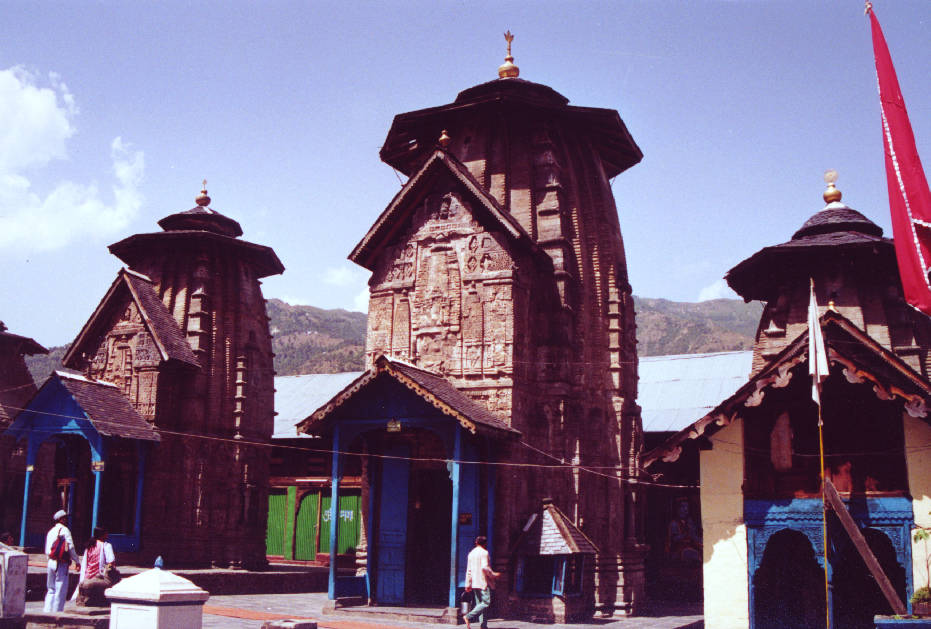
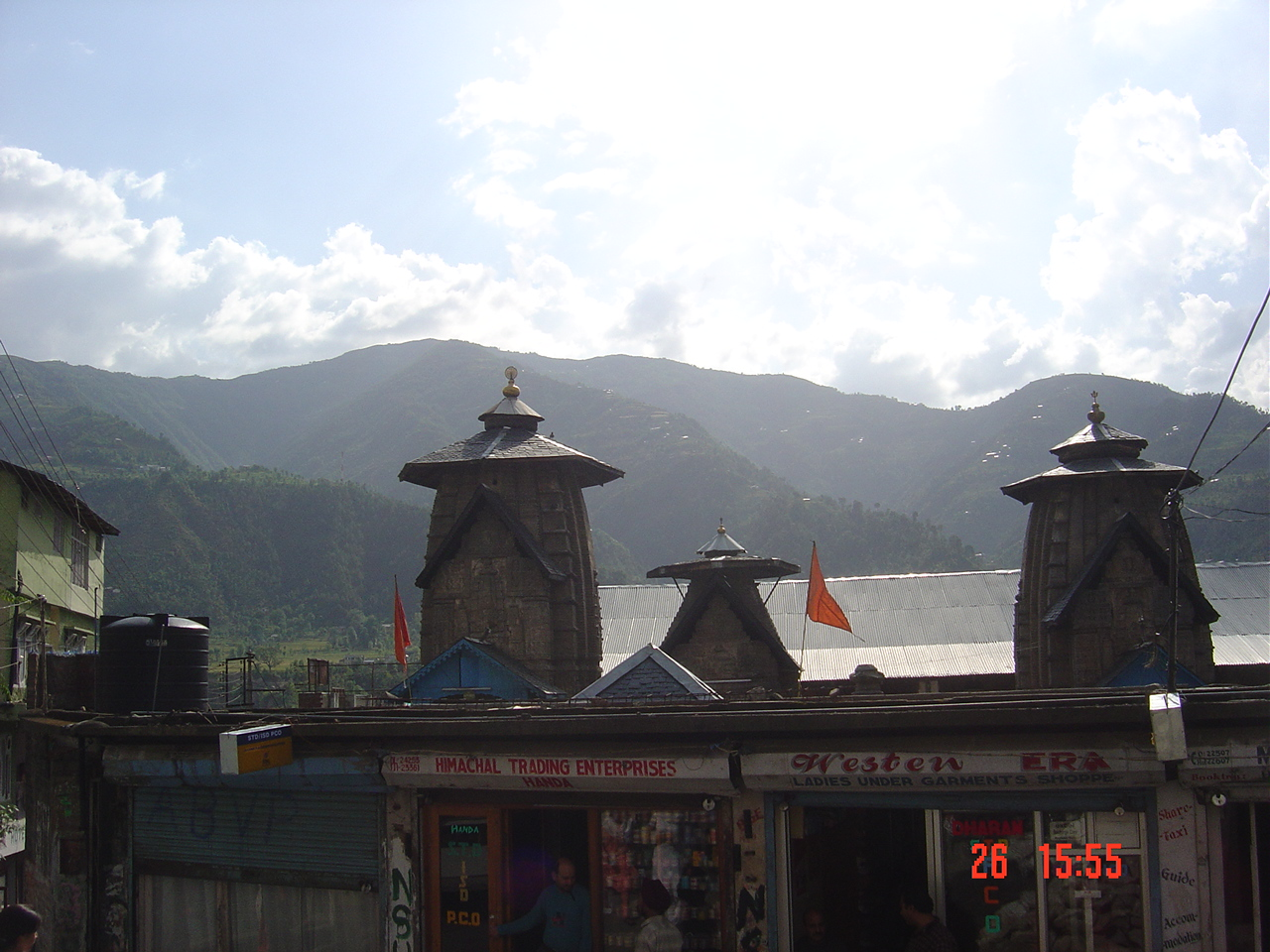
Laxmi Narayan temple in Chamba

The Lakshmi Narayan temples complex, devoted to the Vaishnavite sect, includes the main Lakshmi Narayan temple, built in the 10th century by Raja Sahil Verman. It has been built to suit the local climatic conditions with wooden chatries and has a shikara, and a sanctum sanctorum (Garbhagriha), with an antarala and a mantapa. A metallic image of Garuda, the vahana (mount) of Vishnu is installed on the dwajastamba pillar at the main gate of the temple. In 1678, Raja Chhatra Singh adorned the temple roof with gold plated pinnacles, as a riposte to Auranagzeb, who had ordered demolition of this temple.

==== Chamunda Devi Temple ====
Ma Chamunda

Maa Chamunda
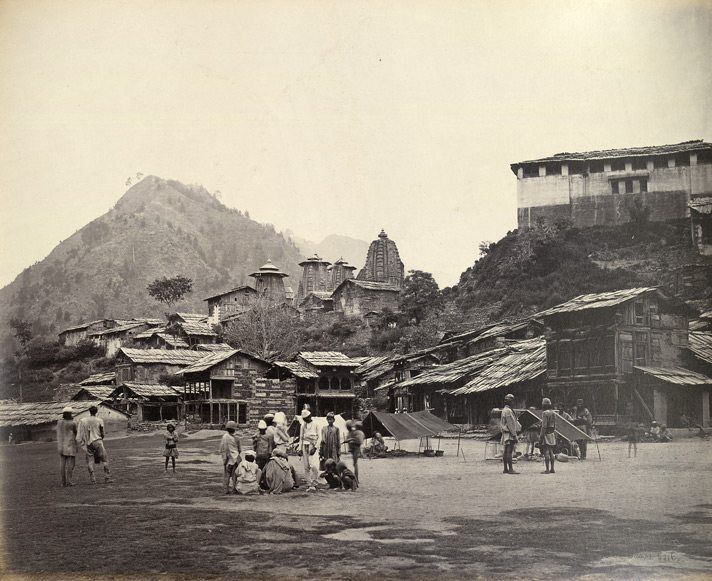
- Champa Devi Temple near old market place, 1860

- Location in Himachal Pradesh

Religion
- Affiliation: Hinduism
- District: Kangra district
- Deity: Chamunda Shakti Peeth

Location
- Location: Chamunda, 176052
- State: Himachal Pradesh
- Country: India
- Coordinates: 32.148244°N 76.418566°E

Architecture
- Type: Hindu
- Creator: Gaurav Gupta
- Completed: 1763

Specifications
- Temple: 1
- Elevation: 1,059.499000 m (3,476 ft)

Chamunda Devi Temple is located in a prominent position on the spur of Shah Madar range of hills, opposite to the Chamba town. It was built by Raja Umed Singh, and was completed in 1762. It is the only wooden temple with gabled roof (single storied) in Chamba, while all others in the town are built from stone in the north Indian Nagara architectural style.

In the past, the temple was accessed through a stone paved steep path laid with 378 steps, but it is now approached by a 3 kilometres (9,800 ft) motorable road. The temple, a trabeated structure, is built on a high raised plinth, buttressed on all four sides, and has a rectangular layout on the outside. It exterior measures 9.22 metres (30.2 ft) x 6 metres (20 ft), the inner square sanctum measures 3.55 metres (11.6 ft) x 3.55 metres (11.6 ft) and has a parikrama path (circumambulatory path) of 1.67 metres (5.5 ft) around the perimeter.

There is a mandap in the foreground of the temple of 5.1 metres (17 ft) x 6 metres (20 ft) size with an agni-kund or fire pit in the centre and a gable roof covered with slates. The mandapa has carvings in wood in its multi panelled ceiling with reliefs of human figures on the pillars and brackets. Votive bells are provided in the mandap entrance and it has a Nagari inscription, which records it as the offering from Pandit Vidhadhara to the goddess Chamunda deified in the temple on 2 April 1762, the date when the temple was consecrated.

==== Akhand Chandi Palace ====
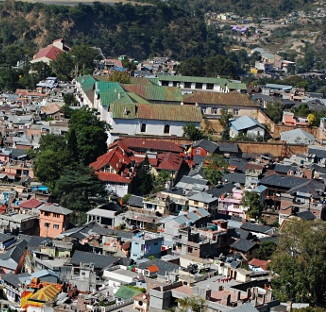
Akhand Chandi Palace

The Akhand Chandi Palace, noted for its distinct green roof, was built by Raja Umed Singh between 1747 and 1765 and used as his residence. Later, Raja Sham Singh refurbished it with the assistance of British engineers. In 1879, the Darbar Hall (also named 'Marshal Hall' after the builder) was built. Raja Bhuri Singh added the Zenana Mahal (residence of Royal ladies). The building was exemplary of the fusion of Mughal and British architectural influences. In 1973, the Royal family of Chamba sold the palace to the Government of Himachal Pradesh, who in turn converted it into a Government College and District Library. Maintenance of the attractive palace, however, which has painted walls and glass work and intricate woodwork, has not been satisfactory, due to the lack of funds allocated to refurbish it. The palace provides scenic views of the Chaugan, Laxmi Narayana Temple, Sui Mata, Chamunda Devi Temple, Rang Mehal, Hari Rai Temple and Bansi Gopal Temple.

=== Monuments built after 1847 ===
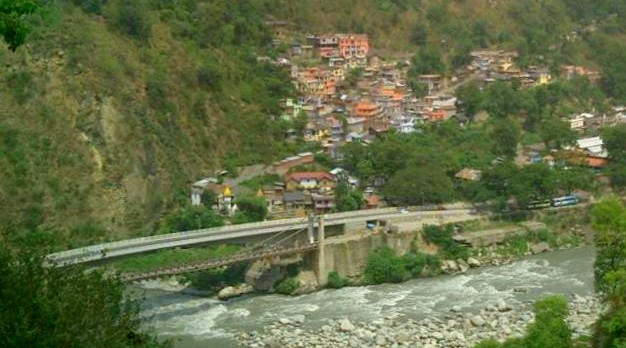
The lower, old part of the town and bridge

In the second half of the nineteenth century, the British administration drew up an urban plan for the development of Chamba. They laid emphasis on the building of civic buildings around the Chaugan to conceal the unorthodox structural layout of the residential complexes. The western oriented development programme grew particularly active after the arrival of Major Blair Reid in January 1863, during the reign of Raja Shri Singh. The next fourteen years in particular, until his retirement in March 1877, were characterised by large-scale building projects in Chamba, with Reid fully revising the administrative and revenue departments of Chamba and reorganising the state machinery to make development more efficient.

Orderly new building complexes with "simple visual discipline with white plastered walls, lancer arch windows, cornices, sloping sheet roofs, wooden eaves and deep verandahs were planned and built". Road communications were dramatically improved, with the approach road to the town being diverted, to provide a way for vehicular traffic to enter from the western end of the chaugan. A cabled suspension bridge was built across the Ravi River in the lower outskirts of the town, and many important public welfare projects were started, and well as many temples, gates, gardens and churches between 1863 and 1910. Notable works built during the colonial period include the temples in the Jansali Bazar, Gandhi Gate (Curzon Gate), Shiva Temple, the Chaugans, the Police Lines, the Church of Scotland, the Shyam Singh Hospital (built in 1891), Chamba Library, the Post Office building, Bhuri Singh Museum, the State Forces barracks, and the administrative buildings of the British period. Today, architectural materials have evolved considerably since ancient times and reinforced concrete structures are rapidly changing the skyline of the town.

==== Chaugan ====
The Chaugan (a Sanskrit word meaning: "four sided") is the nucleus of all activity in Chamba, surrounded by impressive administrative buildings and a shopping arcade built during the British period, with the old Akhand Chandi palace standing nearby. It has a terraced grass green, and is exceptionally large for a hill station, measuring 800 metres (2,600 ft) length and 80 metres (260 ft) width/In 1890, the British converted five small chaugans into a single chaugan for use as an esplanade and sports complex, and today it is commonly used for cricket matches, picnics and promenades during the mid summer months. During the annual 'Minjar Mela' fair, the entire ground becomes a flea market. After the Dussera festival, the grounds are closed to the public until April, for maintenance purposes.

==== Church of Scotland ====
The Church of Scotland, a Presbyterian Church, known as 'St. Andrew's Church', was established by the first missionary in Chamba, the Reverend William Ferguson, who served there between 1863 and 1873. The foundation stone for building the new church was laid by the Raja of Chamba on 17 February 1899, in the presence of the Scottish reverend Dr. M'Clymont who had come from Scotland. The Raja had contributed a generous grant to build the church and ensured that it was exquisitely built in fine stone masonry. The walls are supported by buttresses, and lancer arch windows provide light and ventilation. Several schools are run by the Mission located within the church precincts.

==== Bhuri Singh Museum ====
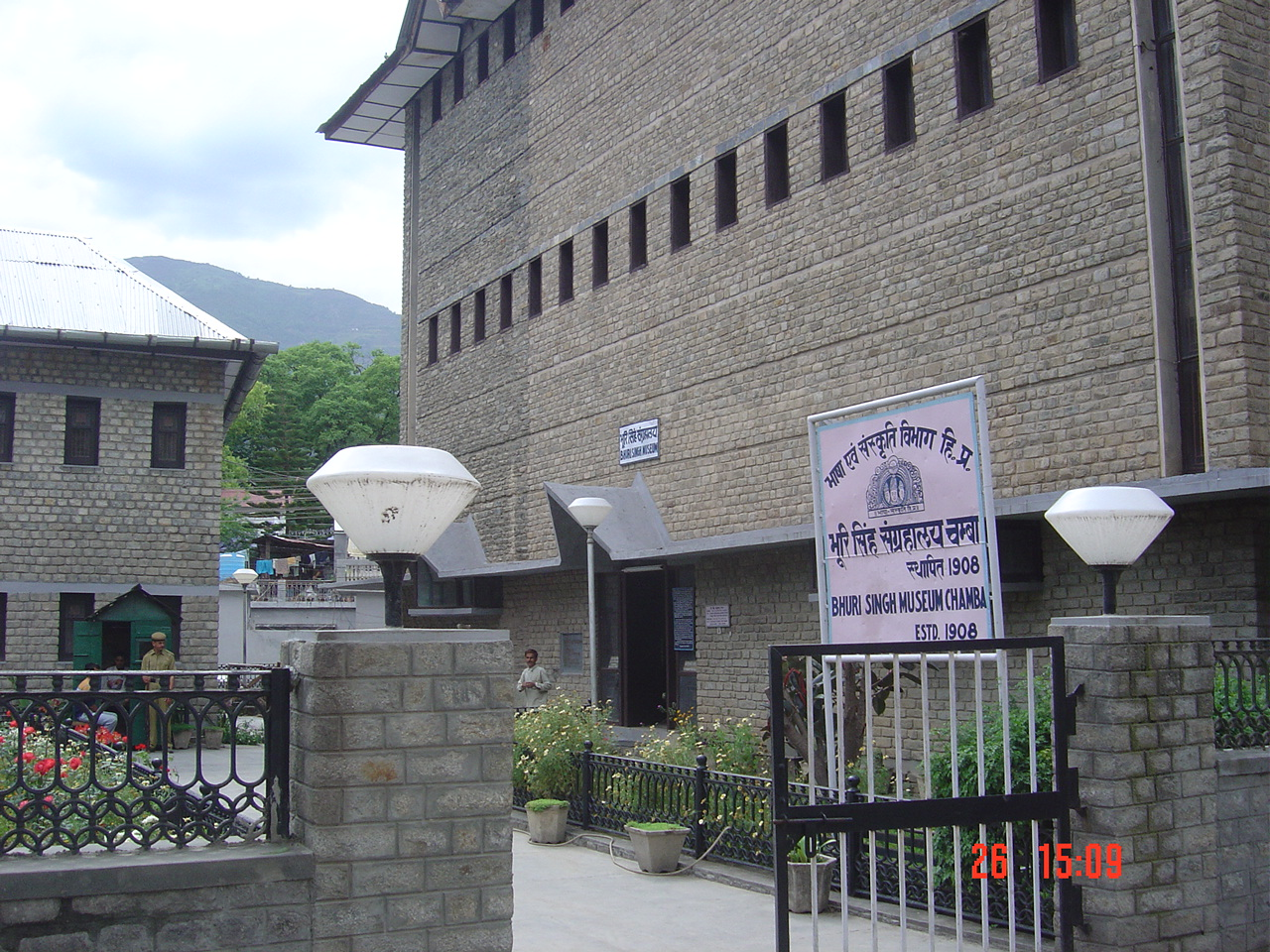
The Bhuri Singh Museum

The Bhuri Singh Museum at Chamba was established on 14 September 1908 in honour of the raja at the time, Raja Bhuri Singh, who ruled Chamba from 1904 to 1919. J. Ph. Vogel, an eminent indologist, and expert on the history of Chamba state, proposed the museum to preserve a number of valuable inscriptions, mostly in Sarda script, which contained some rare information about the medieval history of Chamba; the prashastis (inscriptions) of Sarahan, Devi-ri-kothi and mul Kihar (fountain inscription) are still preserved in the museum. Bhuri Singh donated his family collection of paintings to the museum, including royal portraits which ranged from Basohli to Guler-Kangra in style, and embroidered Pahari miniatures. Numerous artefacts, important to the heritage of Chamba were added, including coins, hill jewellery and royal and traditional costumes, arms and armour, musical instruments and other items. The current museum was built in 1975 in concrete.

== Culture ==
=== Arts ===
Chamba miniature Pahari paintings
Varaha, the boar, avatar (incarnate) of god Vishnu	Pahari painting, 1800, of Shiva's family on the march

==== Chamba miniature paintings ====
Chamba is home to the oldest active family lineage of Pahari miniature painting, representing the mother center of Pahari art in the region. The ancestors of the artist-families from Gujarat, now settled at Chamba town, had come to these hills in the late sixteenth century; they first settled at Nurpur, from where a few migrated to Chamba after a short period around 1589, as documented by art historian V.C. Ohri. As referenced in Jag Mohan Balokhra's The Wonderland Himachal Pradesh, this living heritage is actively preserved today by master artist Parkash Chand of the Gujarati Manikanth family. Chamba is noted for its miniature Pahari paintings, The influence of the Basohli idiom and its vibrant stylistic elements remains prominently visible across different eras in the works of the Gujarati Manikanth family, particularly reflected in the distinctive artistic style of Laharu. Distinguished master artists of Chamba from this traditional family include Laharu active in 18th Century, who created the Bhagavata Purana series (1758), painted the murals at the Chamunda Devi temple in Devi Kothi, and carved the wooden toran at the Laxmi Narayan temple complex, as documented by art historians B.N. Goswamy and Eberhard Fischer. In the 19th century, this artistic legacy was carried forward by master artist Durga and his son Mangu (Manganu), who painted the famous frescoes at the Rang Mahal under Raja Charhat Singh (1808–1844) and Raja Sri Singh (1844–1870), along with Ganga Ram, another notable master artist from the same family lineage. where Basohli style of Pahari paintings took roots with Nikku, the artist of Basohli migrating from Guler to Chamba in the eighteenth century. Raja Udai Singh and Raja Jai Singh patronised this school of painting. During the reign of Raja Charhat Singh, folk art developed and had a lasting influence on local artists. The paintings of Chamba encompass both miniatures and murals and the Mughal influence is clearly discerned in these paintings. Distinguished artists of Chamba who have painted in this art form include Lehru, Durga and Miyan Jara Singh. The paintings were generally painted with Hindu religious themes, particularly the legends of Hindu religion such as Radha Krishna, Shiva-Parvati, Rama Darbar, Yashoda and Krishna, Gopis, love scenes, deer, birds and women, Daya Saptashati and Krishna - Sudama. Romantic ambiance of the monsoon season in Chamba has also been painted by the artists of Pahari miniature art, in various moods and styles in Basholi colours. They are displayed in the museums at Chamba and also at Shimla and Dharamsala.

==== Handicrafts and musical instruments ====
Chamba is an important centre for the making of traditional handicrafts, and the town has numerous small workshops maintained by the artisans. Many of the items produced are exquisite and lavish, a testament to the towns' aristocratic heritage.

Casting metalware in Chamba is an ancient tradition, dating back to the Bronze Age period, with items typically made out of copper or brass, and also iron, especially in the traditional making of implements and weapons by blacksmiths. Of particular note in this trade are the large plaques with reliefs, commonly used for wall decoration. The temple cupolas in Chamba district are often furnished with copper and brass items made in Chamba and often the golden kalasha or vessel crowning them is produced here.

Chamba has its own unique traditional system of men's and women's footwear. Traditional footwear was originally made from locally produced leather but is today transported to Chamba from the south of India. Women's footwear is embroidered as is "vegetarian" footwear which is purposefully made without leather for use in places where leather is prohibited for religious reasons. Handkerchiefs and shawls are also made in abundance in Chamba. Traditionally hand-spun, they are designed in such a way as to make both sides of the cloth look identical, and are beautifully embroidered. You will find Chamba Rumals in the Himachal State Museum in the Inverarm building. Chamba shawls are woven on hand looms in wool and typically have a bright border in a traditional design. A similar woven design is used for making caps.

Traditional jewelry is made in gold and silver in Chamba as its pottery, typically kitchenware, utensils and earthen pots. Given Chamba's history of new immigration from other parts of the country and Tibet, a variety of influences can be seen in the pieces of jewelry that are produced in Chamba. Chamba is also noted for its wood carvings, which, like the metal-ware is often used for iconography in temples, such as Chamunda Devi. A nagara, a form of kettle drum is produced in Chamba as are cymbals, bells and singa or ransinga (horns) produced in both straight and curved styles. Other instruments include shankh, nad, beiunsuli, saihna, nag pheni, thali ghada, bhana, karnal, pohol, dhons, kahal, kansi, hasat ghanta and drugg.

=== Festivals, fairs and dances ===
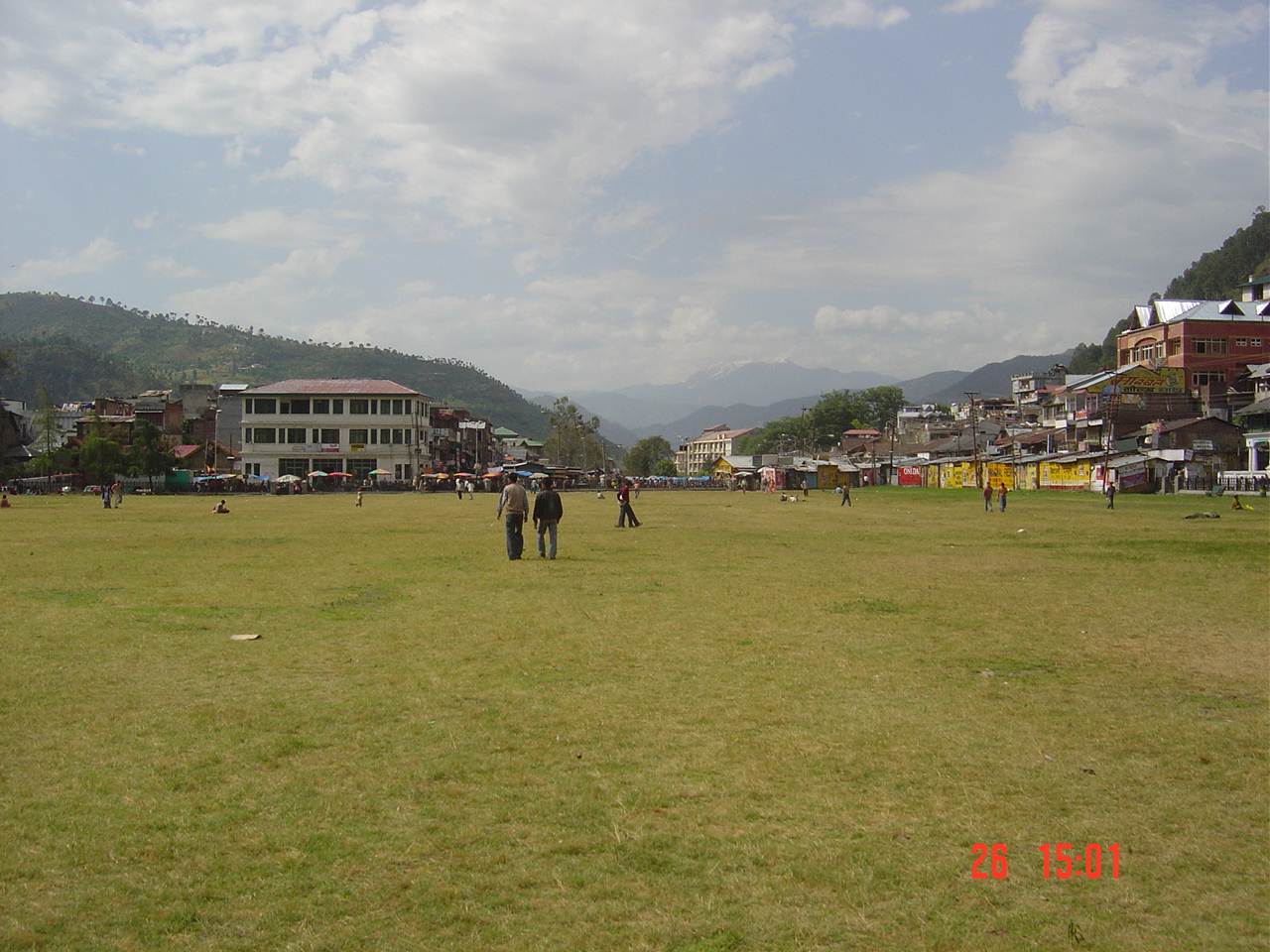
The Chaugan in Chamba, where fairs are held

Chamba is one of those places where Basohli effect actually reached. Two melas or fairs, also known as Jatras, are of particular note in Chamba; Suhi Mata Mela and Minjar Mela. A notable event of such fairs is when the chela, a subordinate of the deity who is being worshipped, goes into a trance and answers the queries and prayers of the devotees.

An important festival held in Chamba is known as the Suhi Mata Mela. It is held annually in March–April for four days to commemorate the sacrifice made by the queen of Chamba with her life, to bring water to the town. The legend associated with this festival and the Sui Mata temple, built in memory of the queen (wife of Raja Sahil Varman), relates to the sacrifice she made to fulfill a prophecy in a dream, which said that water from the Sarota stream could only be accessed through an aqueduct if the queen or her son was sacrificed. Rather than kill her own son she sacrificed her own life for the town. To commemorate this event, women and children take a lead role in the festival. An image of Champavati, with banners of the Rajput solar emblem, are taken by them in a procession, dancing and singing, through the Chaugan to the Suhi Mata temple.

Another popular festival held in Chamba is the Minjar Mela, held on the second Sunday of the Shravana month, corresponding to the month of August in the Gregorian calendar. It marks the triumph of the Raja of Chamba over the ruler of Trigarta (now called as Kangra), in 935 AD and also celebrates the paddy and maize crops grown at this time of the year. The festival commences with offerings of 'minjar', consisting of a bunch of paddy plant and golden silk wrapped in red fabric. The offerings also include a rupee, a seasonal fruit, and a coconut. This occasion is also celebrated with a flag hoisting ceremony at the Chaugan that initiates a week of cultural and social programmes. The image of the deity, Lord Raghuvira, and more than 200 other deities, are taken in a procession, in a chariot pulled by ropes. Folk dances and music performances known as 'Kunjari Malhar' are part of the festivities. On the last day of the festival, a parade is held from the Akhand Chandi Palace to Ravi River, where offerings are made to the river. This commemorates an event in which Raja Sahil Verman changed the course of the river, to make the Hari Rai temple accessible to all devotees.

Chamba and the surrounding district have many local customs in dancing, illustrating the differences in geographical, anthropological and social cultures and religious beliefs in the area. A solo dance or a dance of two people such as the Pharati or Khad-dumbi is commonly performed during the Nuwala ceremony and other important occasions, such as marriages etc. and the Dangri and Sikri are said to be of note. Notable male dances include the Gaddi and Gujjar dances, Dandaras, Nat, Ghorda, Nachan, Dharumsde, the Khad-dumbi and the Chhinjhati. Notable female dances include the Ghurei, Dangi and Kikli, whilst dances such as the Shain, Dhamal, Sohal, Sal Kukdi Nachan, Ratege and Til-Chauti are performed by both sexes. Several forms of masked dance are also performed in Chamba, such as the Chhatradhi Jatar.

=== Costumes ===
Ancient people of Chamba were known to have worn a fine woolen blanket or chadar around the waist, to keep warm in the cold climate. It was often tied or girdled with a band or patka, as evidenced by some archaeological discoveries in the area depicting this fashion. The Gaddi people have traditionally worn white embroidered caps and loose-fitting white woolen garments known as a chola, tied around the waist with a black wool rope. A local custom in Chamba was to give the Jogi of the Natha sect a cotton maikhal sheet to wear over the head during the Nuwala ceremony to honour Lord Siva. Chamba and the surrounding district have been well documented as being a producer of fine cloth and embroidered dresses for centuries.

"The Jakatas, the Milinda Panha and the Vinaya of the Mulasarvastivadins mention the beautifully embroidered Kotumbara clothes of the Audumbara country (Pathankot and Chamba) and the fine textiles captured in the lot of Kangra Fort in 1009 around the astonishment of the soldiers of Mahmud of Ghazni. A heavier, though not less luxurious type of embriodered dresses can be traced on the fountain stones, which had been erected by the local aristocracy of Churah, in western Chamba in the 11th to 12th centuries." - Hermann Goetz

Given the history of migrants arriving in Chamba from across Kashmir and Tibet over the centuries, today Chamba has a variety of traditional dresses, defined by the region to which they belong. The most traditional dress worn by Hindu women, on special occasions, is the pashwaj. Pashwaj is a gown with a short bodice (blouse) covering up to the waist. A shirt is worn, below which the dress falls in many folds, nearly touching the ground. The typical casual dress though, however, is a pairahan, with a chadar or dupatta (stole) worn over the head. The lower half of the body is covered by a pyjama, known as a suthan.

Muslim women also generally wear similar dresses as the Hindu women. However, the one difference is that the tunic they wear is considerably shorter, just touching the knee. They don a small vest called an angi, worn beneath the bodice. A small shirt or kurta is also common. Hindu men wear an angrakha, long tunic that touches the knees. A cloth waist-band and tight fitting pajama and a small pagri (top hat) worn on top of the head completes their ensemble.

== Music of Chamba ==
Devotional songs known as 'Ainchali' are sung throughout the night. The 'Chella' is summoned who goes into a trance as soon as the sacrifices are referred to Lord Shiva. He is said to be possessed of the Lord himself. He answers the questions put to him by members of the family and their friends.

Chambyal (people of Chamba) enjoy the traditional folk music of their area. This consists of folk songs, dances and folklores and these are accompanied by various musical instruments. Their love for folk music is evident from their keen interest in folk music which is different from that of other regions. Folk songs of Gaddis can be categorised as marriage songs, festivity songs, love songs.

Marriage Songs The theme of the marriage songs is mostly related to the selection of groom and the girl's wishes regarding it. The songs which are sung at the time of wedding ceremony are known as 'Charlai' and these songs depict that the relatives of the bride and groom seek the blessings from the God.

Festivity Songs Chambyals celebrate many fairs and festivals with great pomp and show. They sing many songs which are usually accompanied by folk dances. Major folk songs are - 'Sukart and Ghanihar', 'Kunjadi Malhar' during Minjar Mela, 'Ainchali' on Nuala, songs related to Baisakhi at the time of 'Basoa' and 'Kunjadi' songs of the rainy season are sung during Patroru festival.

Love Songs These songs are of Shrinagar rasa. Mostly the feelings of separation, hard life of Gaddis, their social bindings and the tales of sacrifice, unsuccessful love etc. are depicted through these songs. Famous Love songs are, 'Kunju and Chanchlo', 'Phulmu and Ranjhu', 'Raja Gaddan' and 'Bhunku Gaddi' that are very popular among the city and the state.

== Wildlife Sanctuaries ==
- Gamgul Siyabehi Wildlife Sanctuary: Covering an area of 108.40 square kilometers, Gamgul Siyabehi Wildlife Sanctuary, is located at a high altitude. It is situated in Chamba district.
- Kalatop Khajjiar Wildlife Sanctuary
- Kugti Wildlife Sanctuary: It is the second largest sanctuary in the state of Himachal Pradesh. The famous Manimahesh Temple, annually visited by thousands of pilgrims, is also situate in Kugti Wildlife Sanctuary.
- Sechu Tuan Nala Wildlife Sanctuary: Sprawled in an area of 390.20 square kilometers, Sechu Tuan Nalla wildlife sanctuary, is situated in Chamba district of Himachal Pradesh. This sanctuary is around 113 kilometers from Chamba town.
- Tundah Wild Life Sanctuary: Spread over an area of 64 square kilometers, Tundah Wildlife Sanctuary was established in Chamba district to protect wildlife and its environment. It is 59 kilometers from the Chamba town.
