= Government Degree College, Kishtwar =

- Type: Degree College
- Established: 1986
- Academic affiliations: University of Jammu
- Location: Kishtwar, Jammu and Kashmir, India
- Campus: Rural
- Website: https://www.gdckishtwar.in/

Government Degree College, Kishtwar, established in 1986, is a general degree college in Kishtwar, Jammu and Kashmir, India. This college serves the people of Kishtwar and its adjoining areas. This college offers courses in arts, science, and commerce. It is affiliated to University of Jammu.

== Departments and courses ==
The college offers different undergraduate courses and aims at imparting education to the undergraduates of lower- and middle-class people of Kishtwar and its adjoining areas.

=== Science ===
Science faculty consists of the departments of Physics, Chemistry, Mathematics, Botany, Zoology, Environmental Science, and Fisheries.

=== Arts and Commerce ===
Arts and Commerce faculty consists of departments of English, Urdu, Persian, Hindi, History, Political Science, Education, Sociology, Economics, and Commerce.

== Accreditation ==
The college is recognized by the University Grants Commission (UGC).
