= 2013 Kishtwar clashes =

Sectarian violence in Jammu and Kashmir

2013 Kishtwar Communal Clashes
- Date: 9 August 2013
- Location: Kishtwar
- Caused by: Attempt to create communal disharmony for electoral gains

Parties
Muslims	Hindus	Police, Army

Casualties and losses
4 killed	1 killed	

Casualties
- Deaths: 3
- Injuries: 80

The 2013 Kishtwar Riots, which claimed three lives and injured 80, was a conflict between Muslim and Hindu communities in Kishtwar, Jammu and Kashmir. The riots occurred in the aftermath of the Eid festival on 9 August 2013, and provoked a significant government lockdown in the Jammu region. Despite that, the government was criticized for not preventing the riots.

== Initial clashes ==
The conflict was orchestrated by the Communal forces by closing the most Sacre day of Eid Ul Adha and instigating the Muslim Men coming for prayers at Chowgan. Free use of Weapons and ammunition from both sides was seen and in this lawlessness many were killed including one person Arvind Bhagat who was hit by bullet fired by unknown person when heavy firing was going for mob dispersal, One muslim person Bashir Ahmed was burnt alive by putting a tyre on his head and pouring petrol on the tire rim and setting him on fire and crowd enjoyed his burning for an hour minutes before he was reduced to ashes. In Padder Tehsil Village Defence Guards of Hindu Community fired about 1000 bullets at Kijaye village having Muslim population injuring dozens of locals. When some injured were taken to Tehsil headquarter for airlifting to Jammu hospital the Hindu mob led by local Hindu leaders crushed head of father of one of the injured youth named Lasaa Khanday and dragged his dead body throughout streets before police took control of situation. one Muslim Gujjar person from Bonjwah who went missing initially was later allegedly confirmed dead by mob while he was on a labour job somewhere in. The riots were instrumental in creating a national furore started when a bike rider was trying to make their way through a procession of Muslims who were going for Eid prayers but they are not given a way out. The Muslims reportedly began a heated argument with bike rider which are Hindu. This soon degenerated into a violent conflict between both religious communities. The riots led to the killing of one Hindus and three Muslim persons. Later, Muslim mobs hearing about killing of youth by Hindu mobs at Padder and Parade ground moved through the market area, setting fire to the shops and homes of Malik's, Qazi’s and other muslim Families which were rented to non muslims. Police were fired on from homes, leading to the confiscation of the weapons of Village Defence Committee members. People involved in the clashes initially threw stones; later, shops and houses were gutted. The situation was handled by the state government, who called in the army. The state government also prohibited the entry of politicians into affected areas, due to fears that their presence could further inflame tensions.

The riots killed three, left 80 others injured, and gutted over 100 houses and business establishments.

== Aftermath ==
=== 9 August ===
- A curfew was immediately imposed on the area and several changes were made in the administrative positions.

=== 10 August ===
- Clashes continued in Paddar, with three injured.
- The state government stopped traffic along the national highway from Lakhanpur to Banihal and towards Doda and Kishtwar.
- Amarnath Yatra, a pilgrimage to the Amarnath Temple, was cancelled due to tensions in the district.
- The Government of Jammu and Kashmir announced ex-gratia relief of 500,000 rupees to the relatives of Aravind Kumar Bhagat.
- Educational institutions remained closed.

=== 11 August ===
- Mobile phone and Internet communications were suspended.
- The curfew was extended to Udhampur, Samba, and Kathua, along with Bhaderwah town in Doda, affecting seven of ten districts in the Jammu region.
- BJP Leader of the Opposition in the Rajya Sabha Arun Jaitley was prevented from entering Kishtwar, to prevent further escalation of violence.

=== 12 August ===
- Fresh violence broke out in Hidyal village, part of Kishtwar, where a Muslim mob consisting of armed members attacked a Hindu neighborhood. 10 injured, including an ASP.
- Minister of State for Home Sajad Kichloo resigned.

=== 14 August ===
- Almost 150 people were arrested, including some local Hurriyat leaders, as the police cracked down on miscreants responsible for violence in the region. Over 100 people involved in stone pelting and arson were arrested in several parts of the Jammu region.
- Internet services for mobile phone and Wi-Fi users remained suspended for the fourth day across Jammu and Kashmir. Internet speeds for broadband services were reduced to check the upload of objectionable material to social networking sites.

=== 15 August ===
- The curfew was lifted in seven districts of the Jammu region, except for Kishtwar, where a 4-hour morning relaxation is given.

== Arrests ==
As of August 13, 2013, a total of 141 people had been taken into custody, in connection with the incidents. Nearly 40 weapons looted from a Kishtwar arms shop remained missing.

=== Administrative failure ===
Administrative failure was cited as the reason for Kishtwar clashes. The Central Security establishment mentioned issues such as:

1. Low police strength.
2. Possible failures in assessing the gravity of the situation, related to lack of staff during Eid.
3. Failure to call in the two companies of Sashastra Seema Bal deployed in the area as reinforcement.
4. No deployment of CRPF in the district. The CRPF, which had 60 companies in the state to maintain law and order, was called into Kishtwar on only the second day of the riots.

The home ministry had issued an advisory asking the Government of Jammu and Kashmir to prevent violence from spreading further by deploying adequate forces in all parts of the state.

== Reactions ==
The reactions of some politicians are listed below in their original form.

"Oh that's right they can't because their star PM hopeful waited days to call out the army & has yet to apologise. Hypocrites."

— Omar Abdullah

"During such processions, some hot-headed people always make demands of 'azadi'. It happens virtually every Friday...Since information moves very fast these days, tension spread to other parts of the town. It became difficult for the police to control it. Then, the Army was called. The Army conducted a flag march at 5.30 pm and imposed strict curfews thereby bringing the situation under control."

— P. Chidambaram

"When the riots occurred in Gujarat in 2002, the Army was not allowed inside. No one from outside was allowed to enter Ahmedabad. And Gujarat is not a property of Modi."

— Farooq Abdullah
