= Kishtwar =

Town and district headquarters in Jammu and Kashmir

- Town
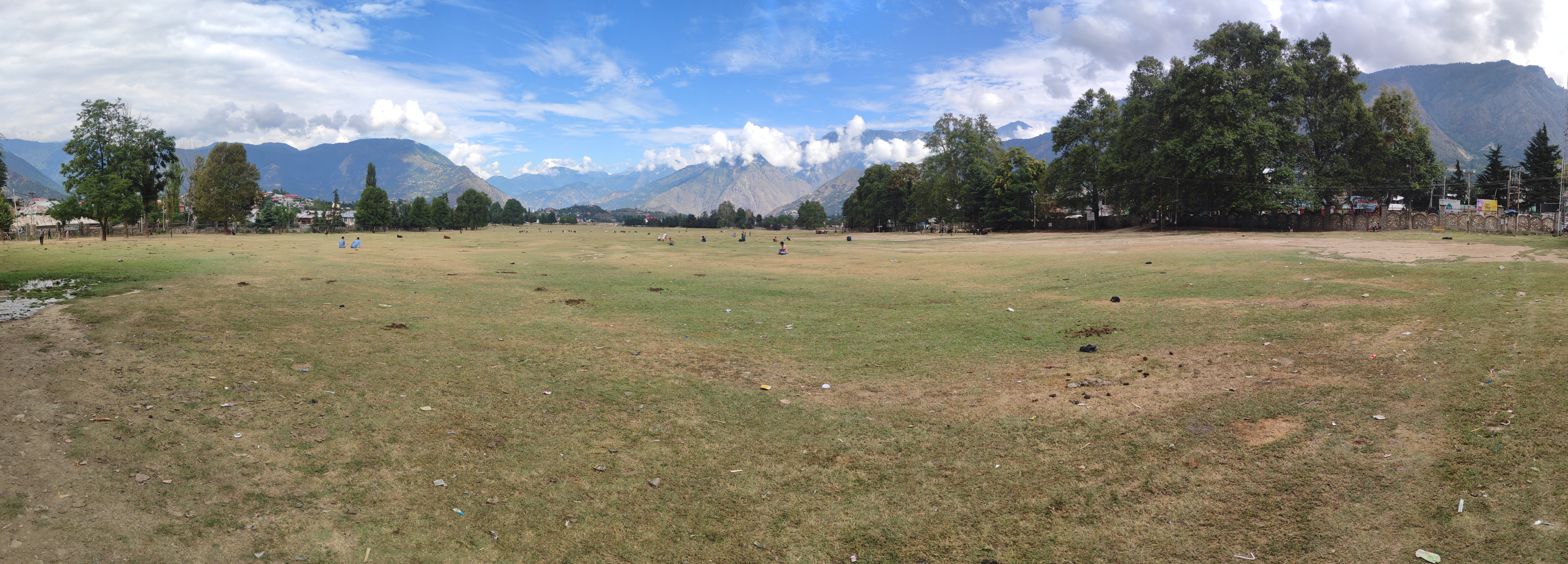
- View of Chowgan Ground in Kishtwar town, Jammu and Kashmir, India

- Location in Jammu and Kashmir, India Kishtwar (India)
- Coordinates: 33.32°N 75.77°E
- Country: India
- Union Territory: Jammu & Kashmir
- Division: Jammu
- District: Kishtwar

Government
  - Type: Municipal Council
  - Body: Kishtwar Municipal Council

Area
  - Total: 22.5 km^{2} (8.7 sq mi)
- Elevation: 1,634 m (5,361 ft)

Population (2011)
  - Total: 14,865
  - Density: 661/km^{2} (1,710/sq mi)

Languages
  - Official: Kashmiri, Urdu, Dogri, Hindi, English
  - Spoken: Kashmiri, Urdu, Kishtwari, Dogri, Hindi
- Time zone: UTC+5:30 (IST)
- PIN: 182204
- Vehicle registration: JK17
- Website: www.kishtwar.nic.in

Kishtwar is a town, municipality and administrative headquarter of the Kishtwar district in the Indian-administered Jammu and Kashmir in the disputed Kashmir region. The district was carved out of the Doda district in 2007. and is located in the Jammu division. The town of Kishtwar is situated at a distance of 209.5 km (130.2 mi) from the summer capital of Srinagar, and 211.5 km (131.4 mi) from the winter capital of Jammu. A large ground locally called as Chowgan ground is located in the heart of the town. The old name of Kishtwar was "Kāṣṭhavāṭa" as mentioned in Rajatarangini of Kalhana Pandita written in 1148 CE.

In 2013, the municipality was the location of the Kishtwar Riots, which claimed three lives and injured 80 more, and was a conflict between Muslim and Hindu communities that occurred in the aftermath of the Eid festival on 9 August 2013 at Kishtwar, Jammu and Kashmir.

== Demographics ==
Religion in Kishtwar City (2011)
1. Islam (69.2%)
2. Hinduism (29.6%)
3. Sikhism (0.65%)
4. Christianity (0.23%)
5. Buddhism (0.16%)
6. Not Stated (0.16%)

As of the 2011 Indian census, Kishtwar had a population of 14,865. Males constitute 63% of the population and females 37%. Kishtwar has an average literacy rate of 78%, higher than the Indian national average: male literacy is 82%, and female literacy is 42%. In Kishtwar, 11% of the population is under six years of age. The main language spoken here by Muslims is Kashmiri, while the Hindus of Kishtwar speak a dialect of Kashmiri language called Kishtwari. The dominant religion in Kishtwar is Islam, at 70.3% of the population, while there are 28.6% followers of Hinduism.

== Transport ==
=== Air ===
Kishtwar does not have its own airport as of 2023, although there is a helipad located 3 km north of the city. The government has a project for a 1200–1300 airstrip in Kishtwar in the upcoming years. The nearest airports to Kishtwar is Srinagar International Airport located 208.8 km away.

=== Rail ===
There is no rail connectivity to Kishtwar. The nearest railway station is Udhampur railway station, located at a distance of 150 kilometres.

=== Road ===
Kishtwar is well-connected by roads to other places in Jammu and Kashmir and the rest of India, as several highways and roads pass through Kishtwar, including NH 244.

== See also ==
- Government Degree College, Kishtwar.
- Jamia Masjid Kishtwar
- Bunjwah
