= Kahra village, Mandi =

Kahra
- village
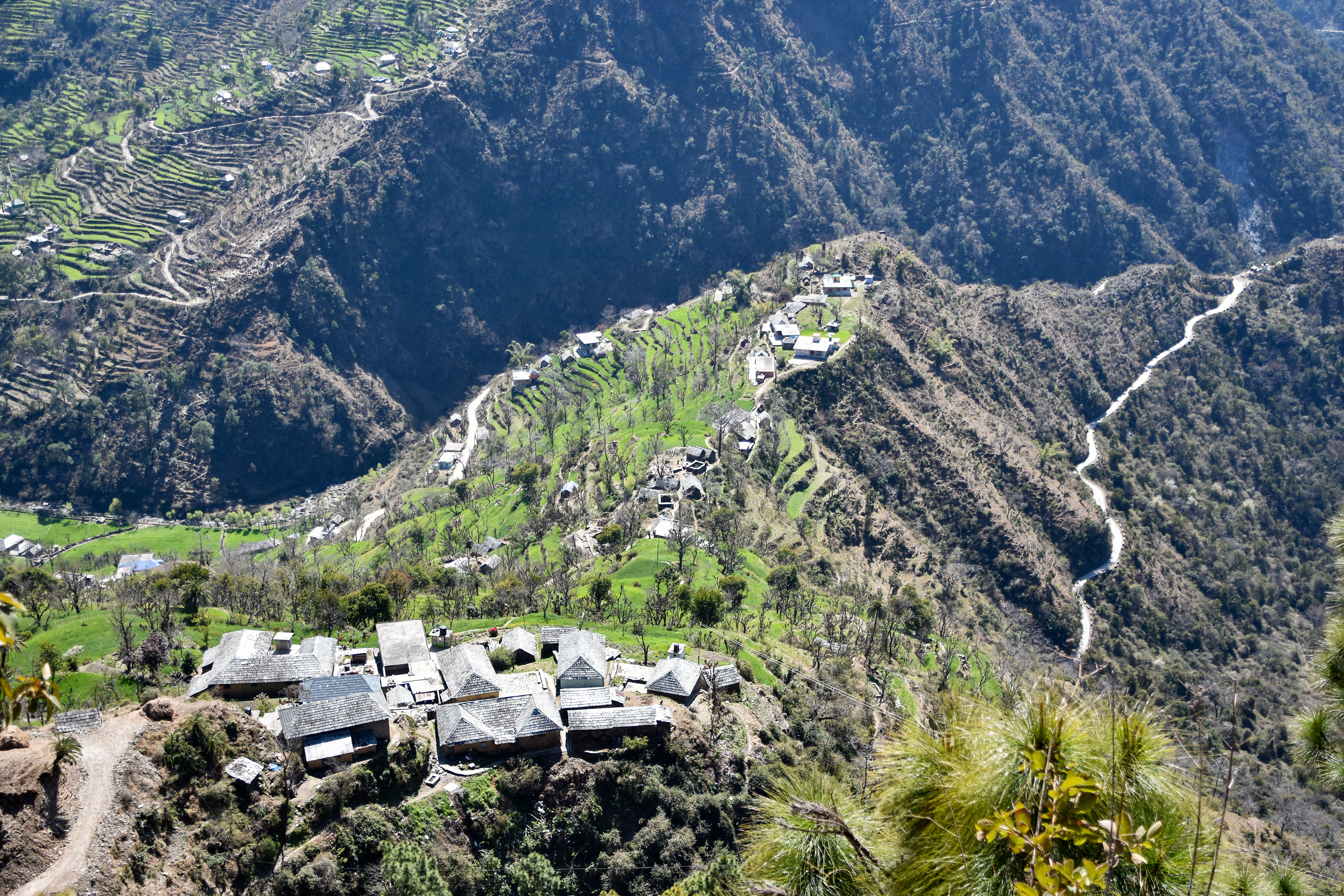
- Kahra village, Mar '19

- Location within Himachal Pradesh
- Coordinates: 31.7638°N 76.9882°E
- Country: India
- State: Himachal Pradesh

Area
  - Total: 1.39 km^{2} (0.54 sq mi)
- Elevation: 1,150 m (3,770 ft)

Population (2011)
  - Total: 339
  - Density: 244/km^{2} (632/sq mi)

Languages
  - Official: Hindi
  - Regional: Mandeali
- Time zone: UTC+5:30 (IST)
- Postal code: 175075
- Vehicle registration: HP-
- Website: https://hpmandi.nic.in

Kahra is a small village in Mandi district, Himachal Pradesh, India. The village is situated on a mountain ridge on the right bank of Neri-ki-khad, a tributary of the Uhl River. It is located 5 kilometres (3.1 mi) from MDR23 Mandi-Bajaura Road, at a distance of 20 kilometres (12 mi) from Mandi town. The South Campus of IIT Mandi borders Kahra and the road to Kahra passes through the campus. The economy of Kahra is largely agrarian.

== Description ==
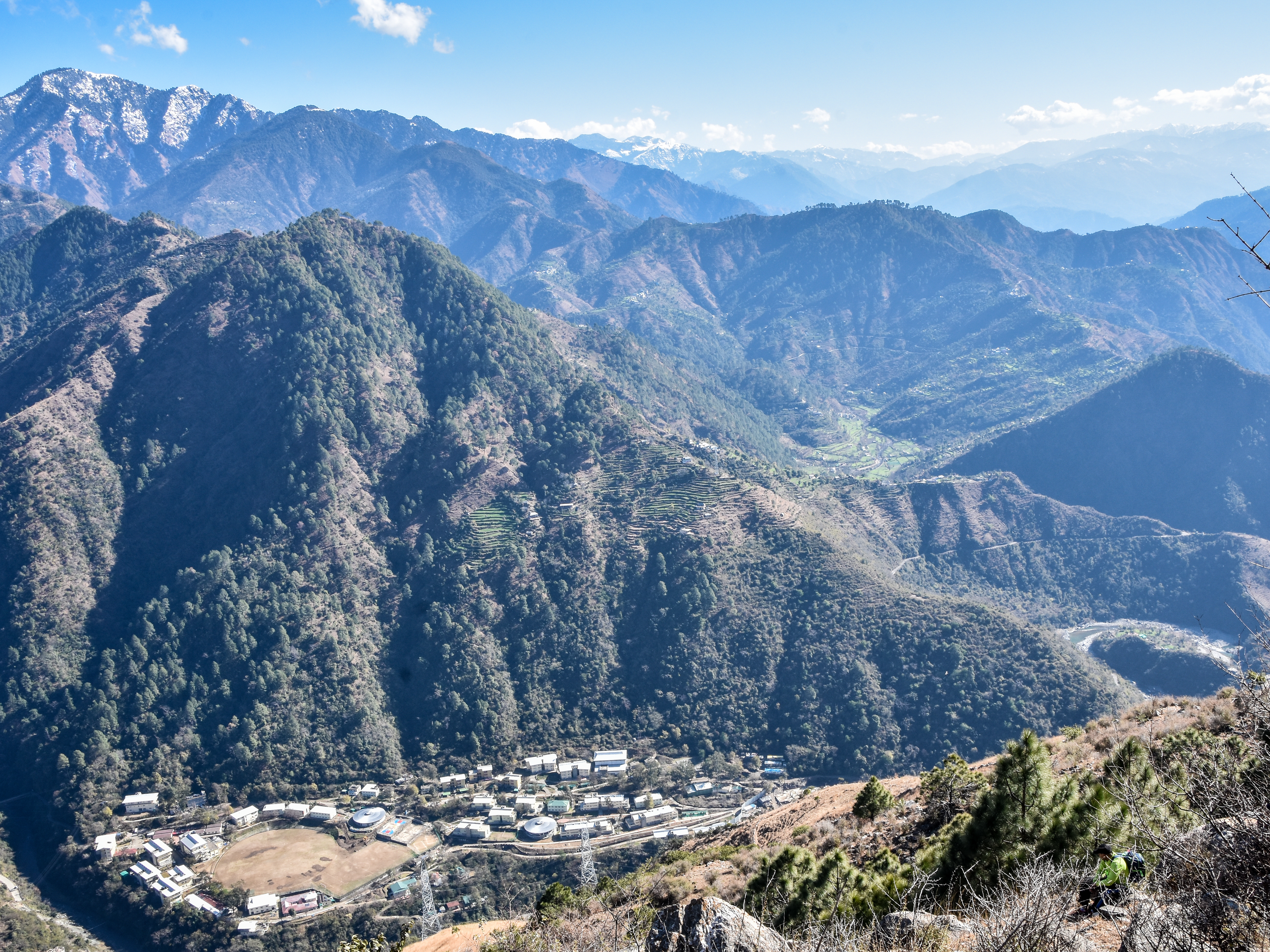
Kahra on a ridge above IIT Mandi, Jan '20

Kahra is a small village on a ridge at an elevation of 1,150 m (3,770 ft), about 100 m (330 ft) above the Neri-Navlay valley floor. It is located at a distance of 5 kilometres (3.1 mi) from MDR23 at Kamand bordering the South Campus of IIT Mandi. The road to the village passes through the South Campus. Kahra village has an area of 139 hectares (340 acres).

The population as of the 2011 Census was 339 with 67 households. Females comprise 51% of the population. The percentages of Scheduled Castes is 47.8% and of Scheduled Tribes is 2.4%. The literacy rate is 61.4%, with males at 72.9% and females 49.2%.

The languages are Mandyali and Hindi. Kahra is a village in the Navlay Gram Panchayat. It is served by the India Posts Branch Office, Kamand with PIN code 175075.

== Education ==
Kahra has a primary/middle school. The nearest government high school is in Kamand village 5 kilometres (3.1 mi) distant. While there is 100% enrolment in primary school, many boys and girls drop out after schooling to take up work rather than higher education. Village youth travel to Mandi for higher education in the Vallabh College or the Industrial Training Institute (ITI) Mandi. IIT Mandi, an institute of national importance, borders Kahra. It offers bachelors, masters and PhD in engineering, and masters and PhD in sciences and humanities. Students come to IIT from all parts of India and from some foreign countries.

== Economy ==
The economy is largely agrarian. Traditionally, maize is grown in the summer (kharif) season. In the winter (rabi) season, wheat, mustard and barley are grown. Livestock rearing is important, with cattle, sheep and goats. Crop residue is saved for use as fodder in winter. There is some export of meat, and sale of milk products, ghee, khoya and paneer, in nearby towns.

The upgradation of MDR23 from Mandi to Kullu that passes through the Kamand valley was taken up during the term of Kaul Singh Thakur as MLA starting in 1977. With improvements in the roads and transport, there has been a shift from grains and pulses to cash crops such as cauliflower, radish, tomato, garlic and beans. Villagers now buy processed grains and pulses from the plains in place of the organically-grown mountain grains and pulses. Villagers report a consequent decline in health, with greater morbidities affecting longevity.

In order to earn extra cash, villagers work as labourers on road construction, etc. With the advent of IIT Mandi since 2010, villagers are employed as Class IV semi-skilled workers. These avenues strengthen the economic opportunities in Kahra.

== Transport ==
Public and private buses and private vans ply regularly between Mandi and various villages in the Kamand valley. The route from Mandi to Navlay passes below Kahra.

== See also ==
- IIT Mandi
