= Government College Chamba =

College in Himachal Pradesh, India

- Other names: GC Chamba; PG College Chamba
- Motto: आरोह तमसो ज्योतिः
- Motto in English: From Darkness to Light
- Type: Public co-education
- Established: 1958
- Founders: Government of Himachal Pradesh
- Academic affiliations: Sardar Patel University Mandi
- Principal: Dr. Vidya Sagar Sharma
- Location: Sultanpur, Chamba, Himachal Pradesh, India; 32.567°N 76.116°E
- Campus: Suburban
- Colours: Green
- Mascot: Candle
- Website: gcchamba.edu.in
- Accredited with 'B++' grade by NAAC in 2022.

The Government College Chamba generally known as Government Post Graduate College, Chamba at Chamba, Himachal Pradesh, India was established in 1958. The college is affiliated to Sardar Patel University Mandi, Shimla and has switched to Choice Based Credit System (CBCS) for Under Graduate classes from academic session 2013-14 under the guidelines of Rashtriya Uchchatar Shiksha Abhiyan (RUSA). It has its own examination centre and also has been recognized as the evaluation centre by the university. The college was accredited with 'B++' grade by NAAC in August 2022.

== History ==
Government College Chamba in Chamba, one of the oldest Princely State in present-day Republic of India was started in 1958 with Arts stream.

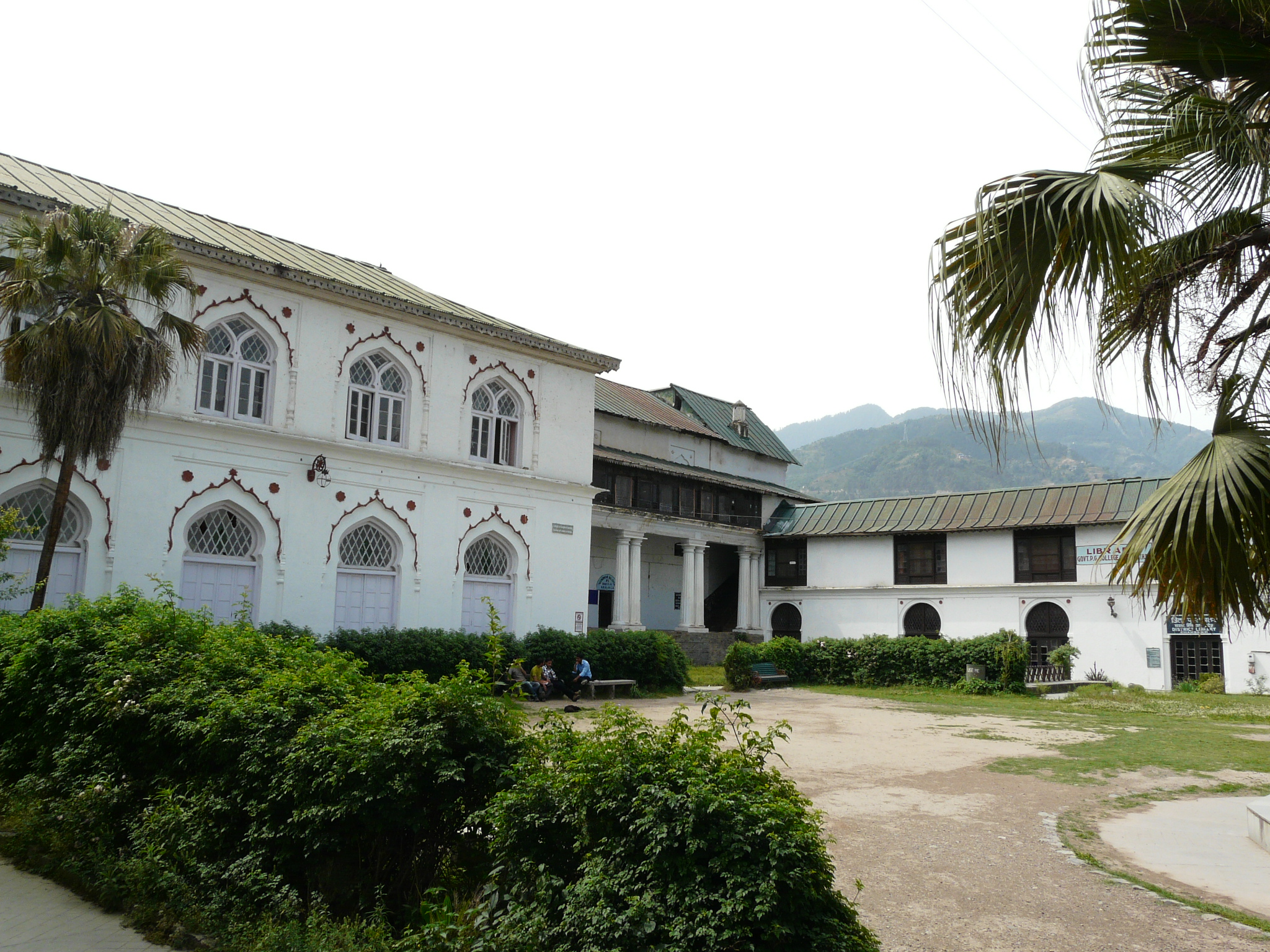
Old College Complex at Akhand Chandi Palace

The College is affiliated to Himachal Pradesh University, Shimla.

Initially, all the classes used to run in the Akhand Chandi Palace of the town.

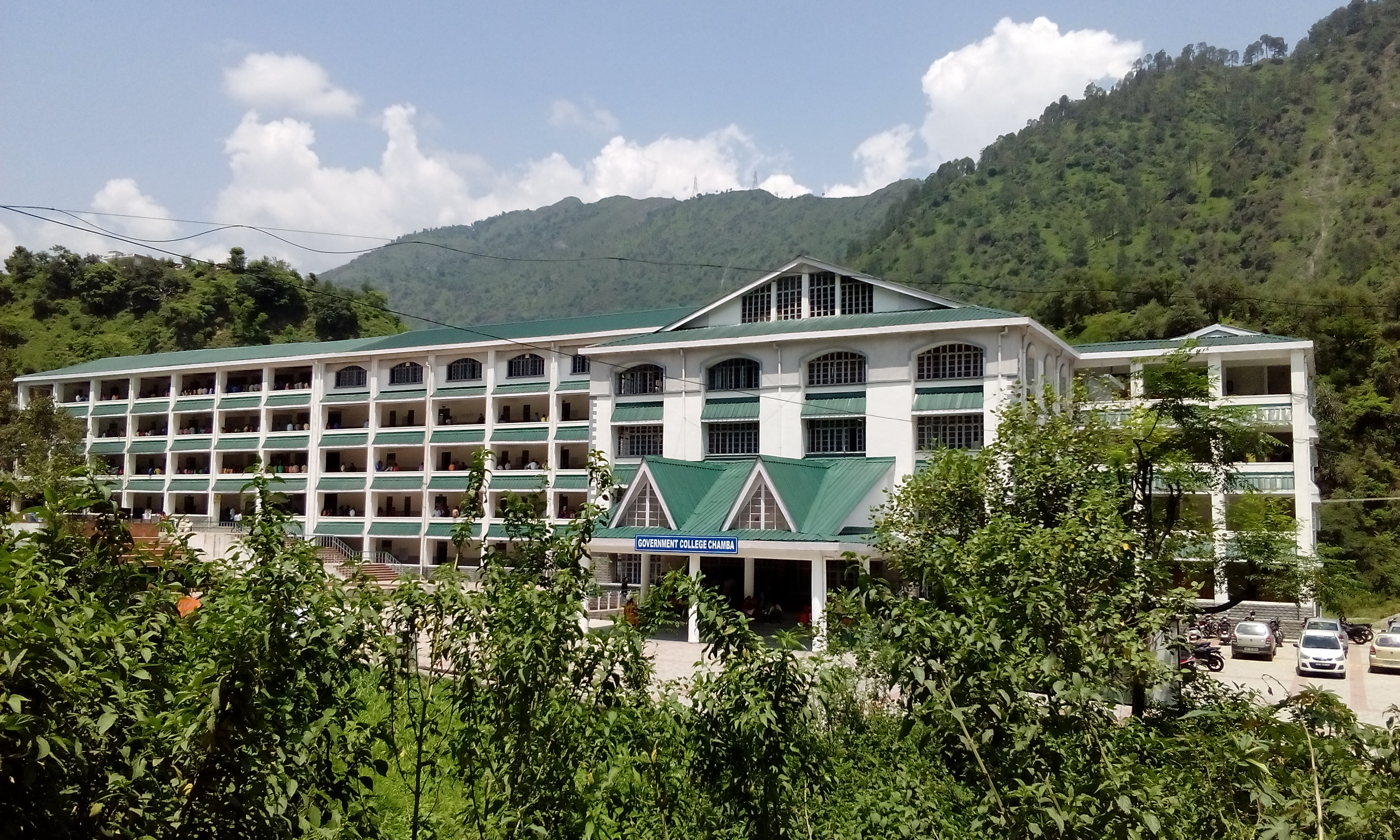
New College complex at Sultanpur

But later on January 15, 2015, the college was provided with a new building at Sultanpur by Government of Himachal Pradesh where all the UG courses are being run today whereas IGNOU Study Centre, Post Graduate classes in five disciplines, B.Voc courses in two trades and other Self Finance courses still run in the old college complex at Akhand Chandi Palace along with MBBS/BDS classes of Pt. Jawahar Lal Nehru Government Medical College And Hospital Chamba.

== Courses ==
1. The college provides twelve Under Graduate courses in Humanities since 1958 as :-

- Economics
- English
- Geography
- Hindi
- History
- Journalism and Mass Communication
- Physical Education
- Political Science
- Public Administration
- Sanskrit
- Sociology

2. Seven Under Graduate courses in Science stream since 1962 as :-

- Botany
- Chemistry
- Physical Science
- Geology
- Physics
- Mathematics
- Zoology

3. Under Graduate course in Commerce since 1982.

4. Self Finance courses like :-

- BBA (since 2008)
- BCA (since 2008)
- PGDCA (since 2010)

5. B. Vocational Degree in :-

- Retail Management (from 2017)
- Hospitality and Tourism (from 2017)

6. Post Graduate courses in :-

- Economics (since 1993)
- English (since 2006)
- History (since 2005)
- Hindi (since 2014)
- Political Science (since 2014)

== IGNOU Study Centre ==
IGNOU Study Centre was established in College in the year 1990 with code 1106. Presently the following courses are being run under this unit :-

1. Bachelor's degree courses :-

- Bachelor's degree Programme (B.D.P.)
- Bachelor of Arts (B.A)
- Bachelor of Science (B.Sc.)
- Bachelor of Commerce (B.Com.)
- Bachelor Preparatory Programme (B.P.P.)
- Bachelor of Tourism Studies (B.T.S.)
- Bachelor of Computer Applications (B.C.A.)
- Bachelor of Education (B.Ed.)
- B.C.W.

2. Post Graduate courses in :-

- M.A.
- M.B.A.
- M.C.A.
- M.Com.
- M.Ed.
- M.E.G.
- M.A.H.
- M.H.D.
- M.S.O.
- M.A.R.D.

3. Diploma courses in :-

- Journalism
- Nutrition and Health

4. Post Graduate diploma in :-

- Foreign Trade
- P.G.D.J.M.
- D.N.A.M.
- P.G.D.F.T.

Apart from this, educational centre has its own Library consisting of 700 books on different topics. It also has its own examination centre.

== Library ==
The college has a computerized library with more than 20000 books on different subjects. The catalog of books has been admitted in Soul Software. It has been subscribed to as many as 11 newspapers, numerous magazines and 3 journals. It also has a book bank through which books are allotted to the students related to integrated rural development program families. 3826 books are available in this book bank.

== Existing cells ==
=== Career Guidance Cell ===
With the objective of providing timely information to the students regarding various career opportunities a cell is functioning in the college.

=== Women Cell ===
This cell has been constituted to achieve the objective of gender equality by making the girls aware of their rights and duties. Gender disparity manifests itself in various forms and the underlying causes for the discrimination are related to social and economic structure, which is based on informal and formal norms and practices. The cell frequently organizes interactive sessions with students to get an insight into women- specific problems which need to be addressed on priority basis for emancipation of women.

=== Co-curricular activities ===
Besides preparing students to participate in the competitions outside the college like youth festival, inter college competitions, the cell encourage and guide them to take part in the celebration of important occasions like Independence Day, The Science and Technology Day, Himachal Day, Hindi Divas, Teacher's Day etc.

=== Tutorial Management Cell ===
In order to encourage interaction between students and teachers, the tutorial groups are created.

=== Grievances Redressal Cell ===
CSCA advisory committee of teachers of different facilities has been constituted.

=== Internal Quality Assurance Cell (IOAC) ===
As per the guidelines of HPU and Higher Authorities, IQAC is working in the college for its allover development.

== Other activities ==
=== National Cadet Corps ===
The college NCC wing is existing under a care taker and College helps outstanding students in NCC and studies.

=== National Service Scheme ===
NSS unit provides opportunities to the students to take part in social service activities and social awareness.

=== The Bharat Scouts and Guides ===
Activities undertaken by The Bharat Scouts and Guides are primarily based on community development. The college has two wings of this organisations:one for boys (Rovers) and the other for girls (Rangers).

=== Sports ===
The college provides opportunities of games like hockey, football, basketball, volleyball, badminton, cricket, and table tennis at College, District, State, and National levels.

== Iravati ==
To nourish the creativity among students, the college magazine Iravati is published every year. It also aims to provide a record of the college's activities and exceptional achievements of fellows, staff, students and alumni.

== College Student's Central Association (CSCA) ==
As per the instructions of Himachal Pradesh University, the students selected for the positions of Office Bearers are purely based on academic merits. Several Nominated Members are also elected with Office Bearers from different fields like Academics, Cultural Activities, Sports, NCC, NSS & Club/Society who excelled themselves in their respective fields.

== National Assessment and Accreditation Council ==
The college successfully completed its accreditation process in 2016. It has been accredited with a CGPA of 2.62 on a seven-point scale at 'B+' grade during the visit of NAAC peer team in August 2016. The accreditation is valid up to September 15, 2021.

== See also ==
- Himachal Pradesh University
- Pt. Jawahar Lal Nehru Government Medical College And Hospital Chamba
- Government College, Sanjauli
- Central University of Himachal Pradesh
