= Khanahr =

Khanahr Salgi
- village
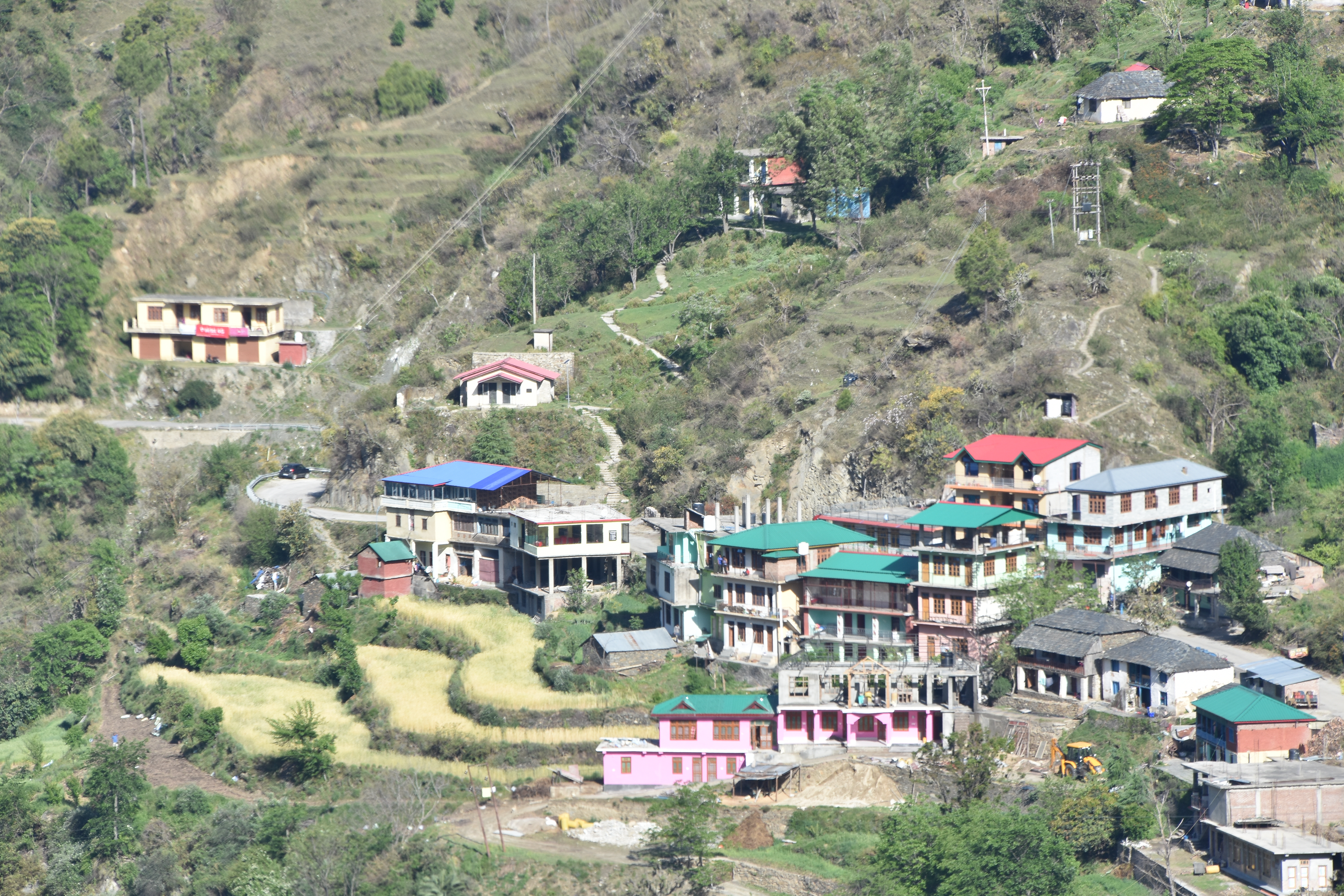
- Buildings and fields along MDR23, Apr '20

- Location within Himachal Pradesh
- Coordinates: 31.78425°N 76.99871°E
- Country: India
- State: Himachal Pradesh

Area
  - Total: 3.95 km^{2} (1.53 sq mi)

Population (2011)
  - Total: 523
  - Density: 132/km^{2} (343/sq mi)

Languages
  - Official: Mandeali, Hindi
- Time zone: UTC+5:30 (IST)
- Postal code: 175075
- Vehicle registration: HP-
- Website: https://hpmandi.nic.in

Khanahr is a small village in Himachal Pradesh, India. The village is situated on the mountain slopes on the right bank of Kataula-ka-khad, a tributary of the Uhl River. It is located on MDR23 Mandi-Bajaura Road, at a distance of 18 kilometres (11 mi) from Mandi town. The sub-village of Salgi is located on the main road. The North Campus of IIT Mandi borders Salgi and the entrance to the campus branches off from MDR23 at Salgi.

== Description ==
Khanahr/Salgi is located on MDR23 Mandi-Bajaura Road, at a distance of 18 kilometres (11 mi) from Mandi town. MDR23 continues on to Bajaura, connecting to Kullu, a distance of 48 kilometres (30 mi) from Salgi. The village has an area of 395 hectares (980 acres).

The population as of the 2011 Census was 523 with 104 households. The languages are Mandyali and Hindi. Khanahr is a village in the Kamand Gram Panchayat. Khanahr village includes the following sub-villages: Chowkidhar, Kayali, Dwardu, Panjaut, Khada Gehar and Salgi.

EWOK, a registered society started by IIT Mandi to cater to the education, training and entrepreneurial needs of rural women, has its office in Salgi. A number of businesses incubated by EWOK are based in Salgi.

== Education ==
A government primary school below MDR23 caters to children from surrounding villages. The nearest government high school is in Kamand village 3 kilometres (1.9 mi) distance. The IIT Mandi Mindtree School adjacent to Salgi caters to the IIT community and to children from villages of Kamand valley and Mandi town. IIT Mandi is an institute of national importance offering bachelors, masters and PhD in engineering, and masters and PhD in sciences and humanities. Students come from all parts of India and from some foreign countries. The North Campus of IIT Mandi borders Khanahr/Salgi.

== Transport ==
Public and private buses and private vans ply regularly between Mandi and various villages in the Kamand valley, passing through Salgi. A few buses pass through en route from Mandi to Bajaura and Kullu.

== Gallery ==
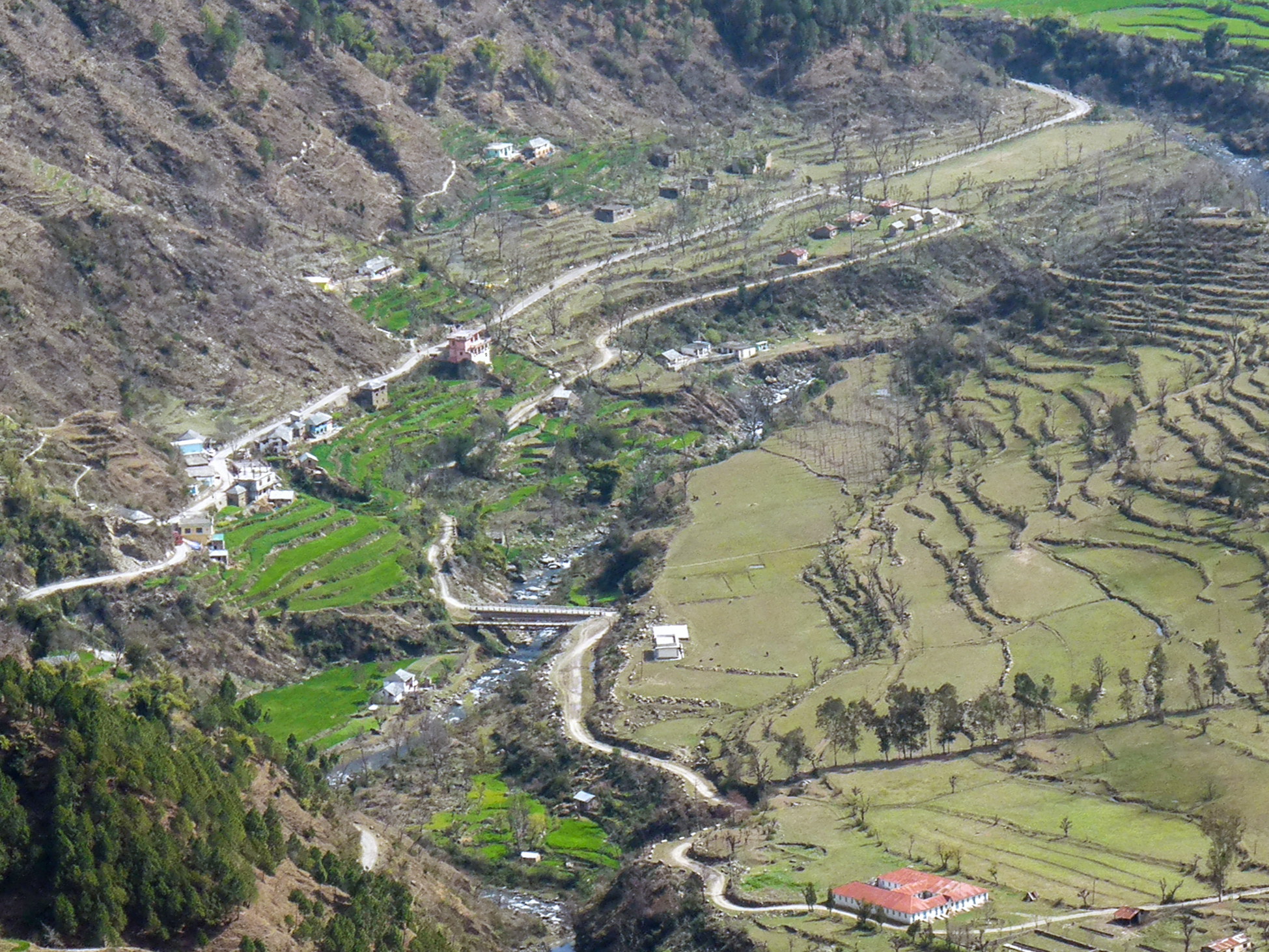
Salgi in Mar 2011, left of centre

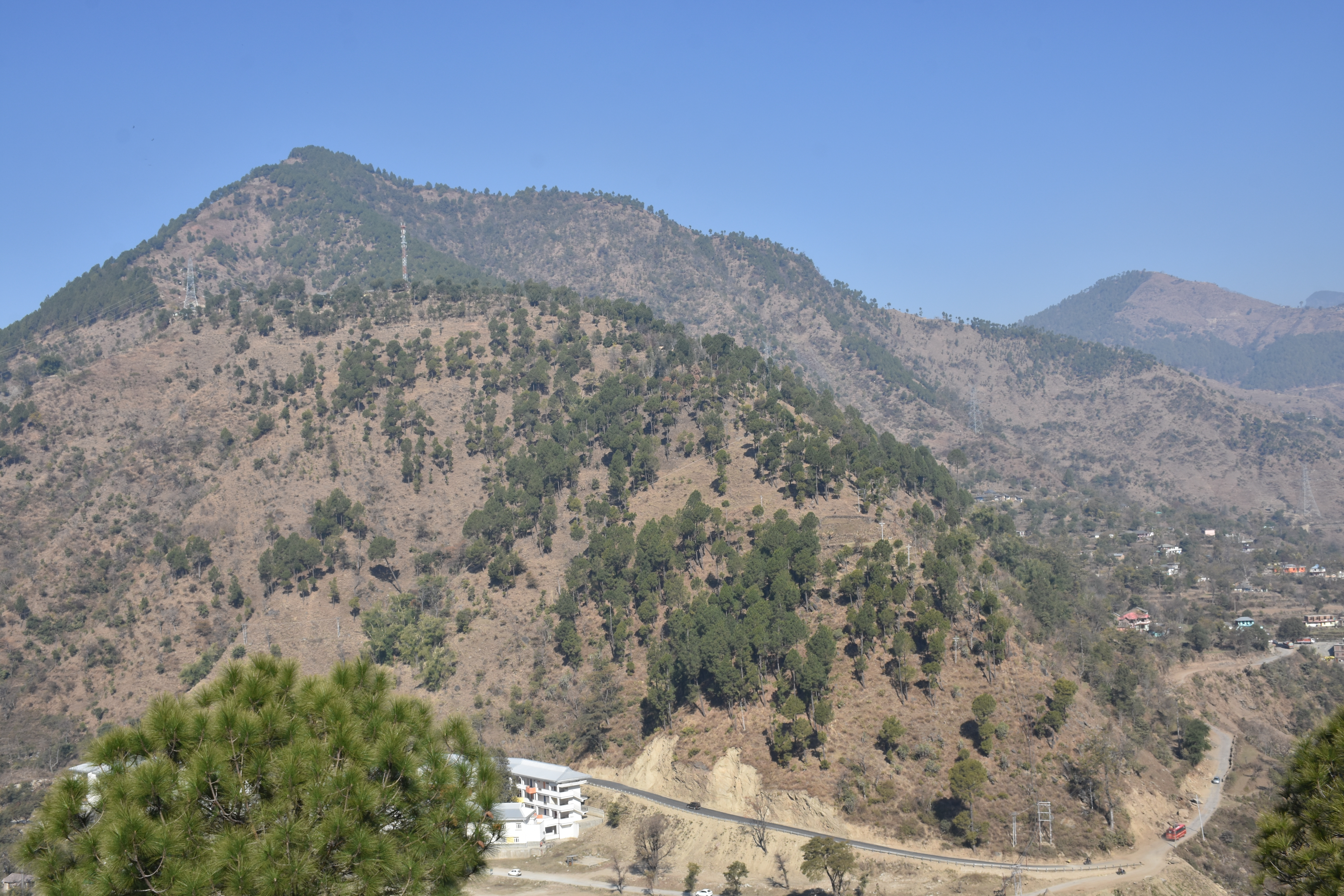
Khanahr Top above Mindtree School and Salgi, Jan '18

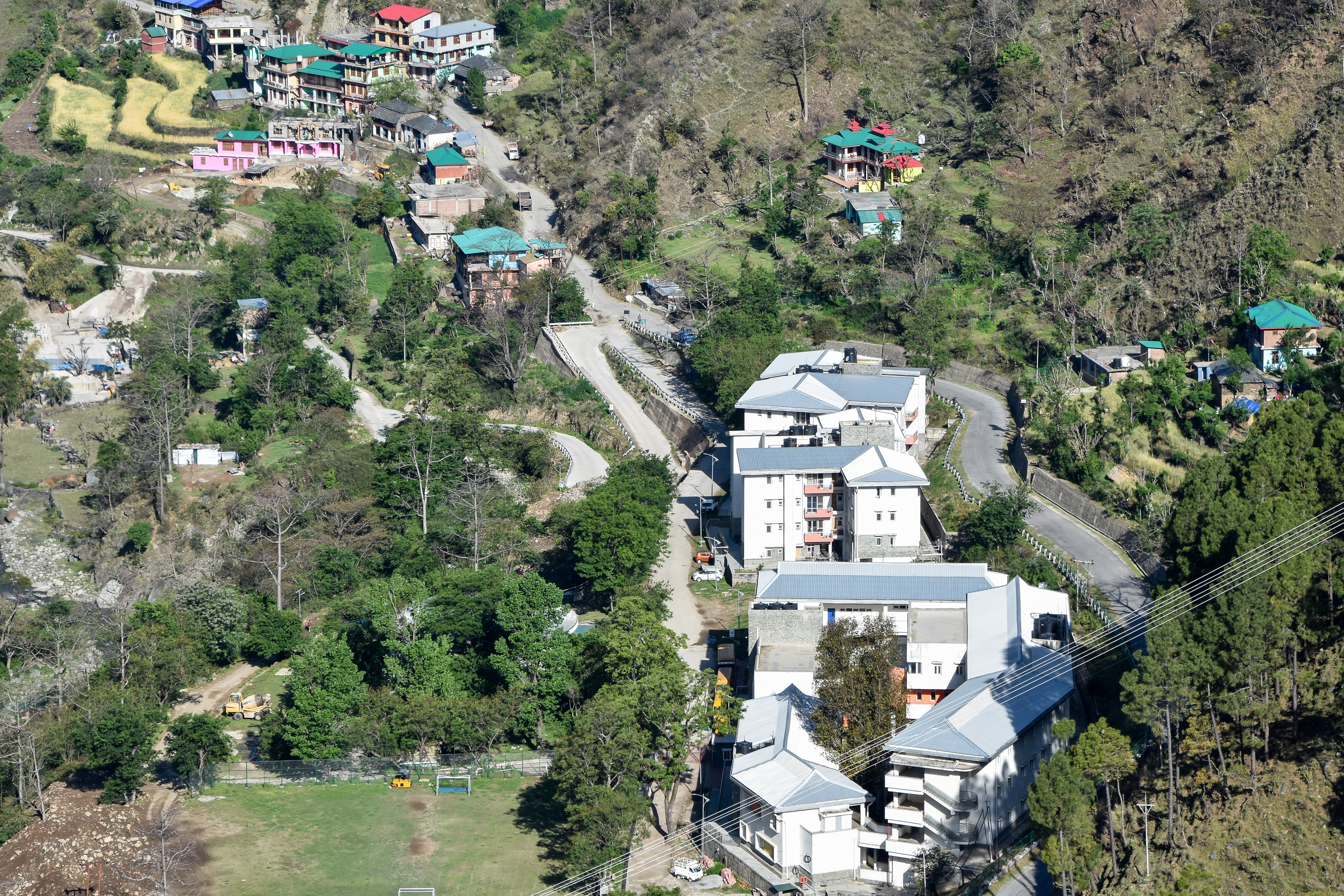
IIT Mindtree School & Salgi village, Apr '20

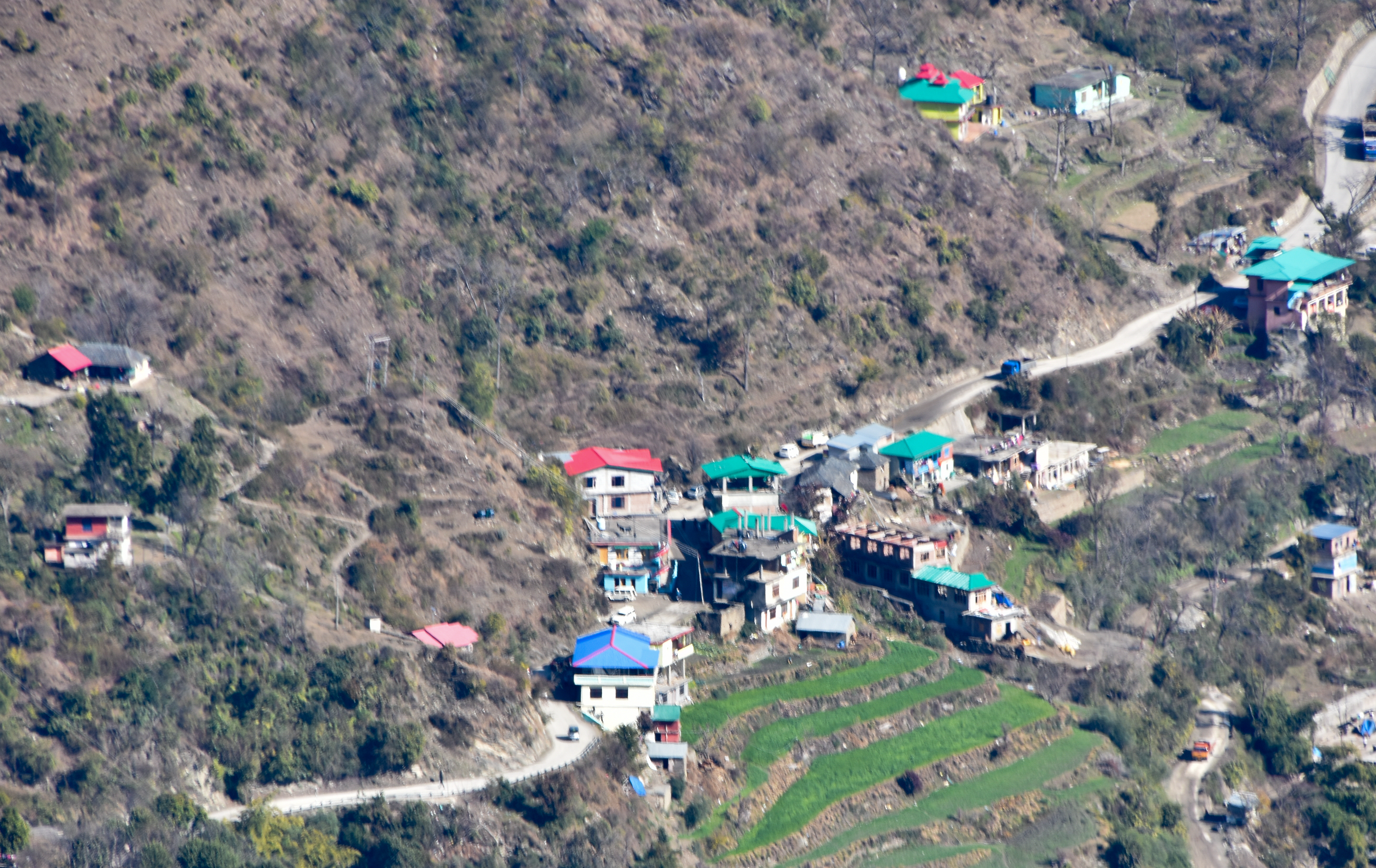
Salgi village from Griffon Peak in the west, Jan '20

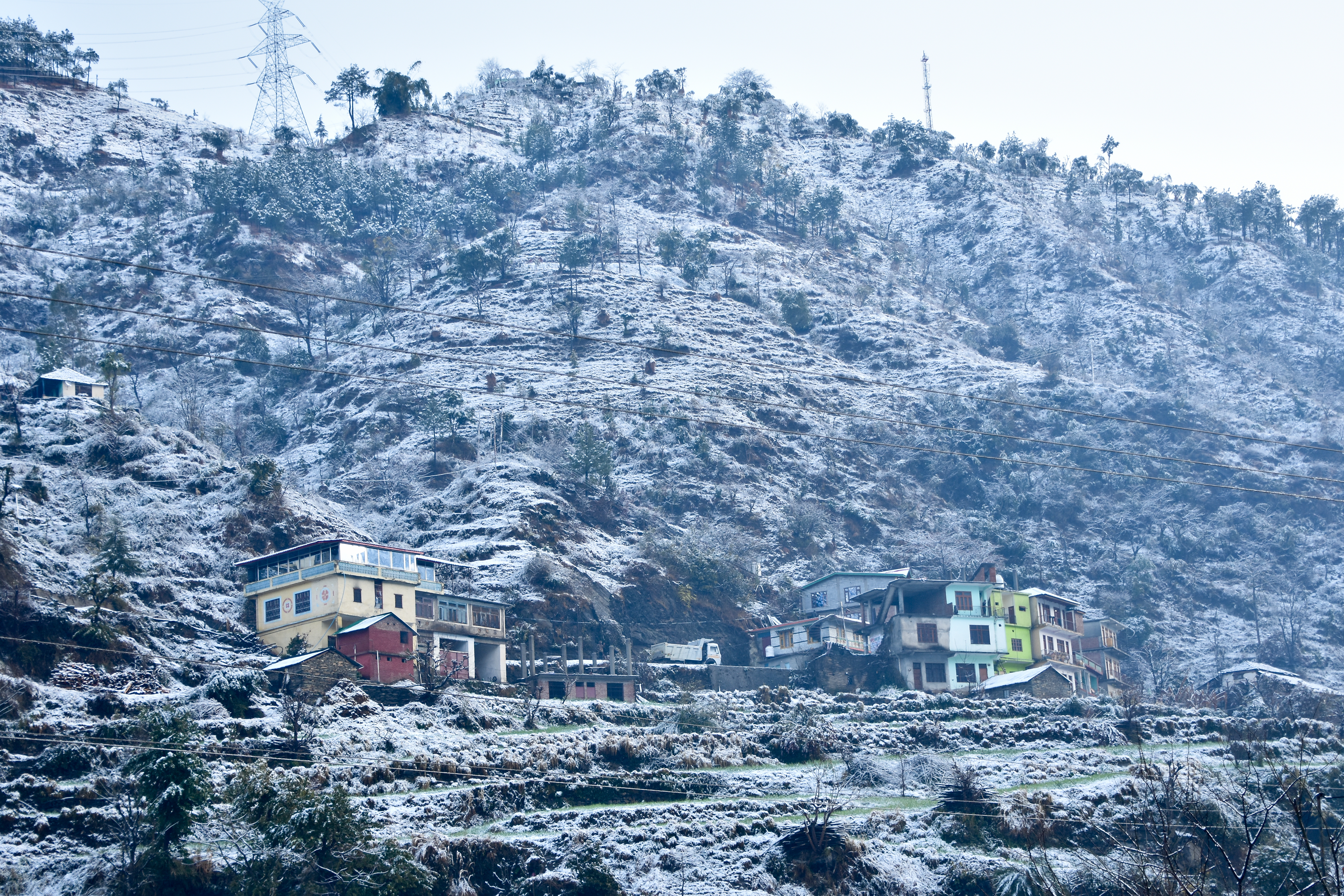
Rare snowfall, view from IIT campus, 8 Feb '19

== See also ==
- IIT Mandi
- EWOK
