= Enabling Women of Kamand =

Startup incubator in Himachal Pradesh, India

Enabling Women of Kamand Society
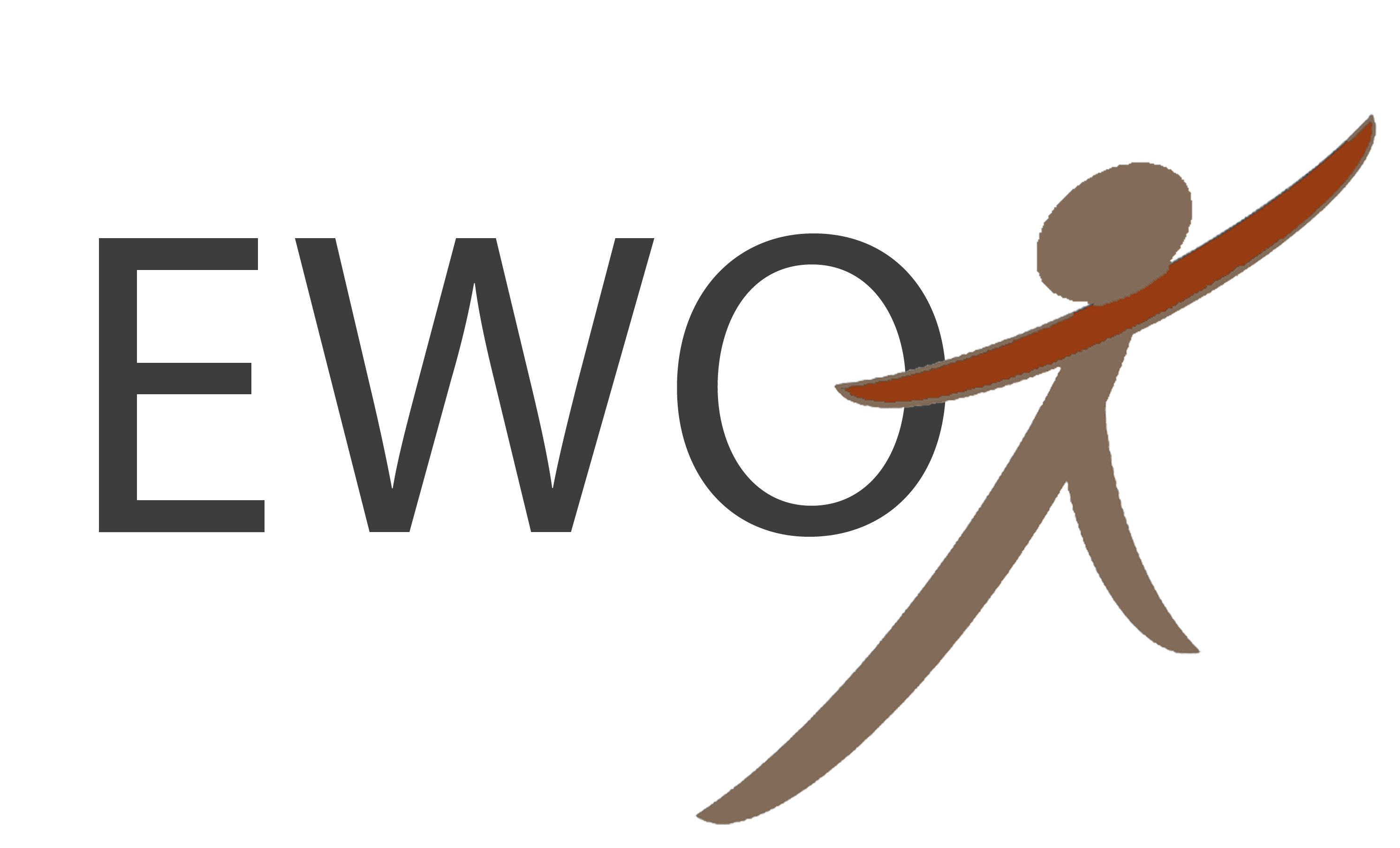
- Other name: EWOK
- Former names: Enabling Women in the Kamand Valley for Career Development using mobile and internet
- Motto: Helping Kamand women take command!
- Type: Business Incubator, Training
- Established: April 2016
- Parent institution: IIT Mandi
- Location: Salgi, Mandi District, Himachal Pradesh, India
- Website: www.ewok.in
- Started as a project by IIT Mandi in April 2016. Registered as a Society in November 2019.

Enabling Women of Kamand (EWOK) Society provides rural women with information, training, guidance and incubation for new business undertakings in the Kamand Valley of Mandi District, Himachal Pradesh. The EWOK office is located in Salgi village, Mandi District.

== History ==
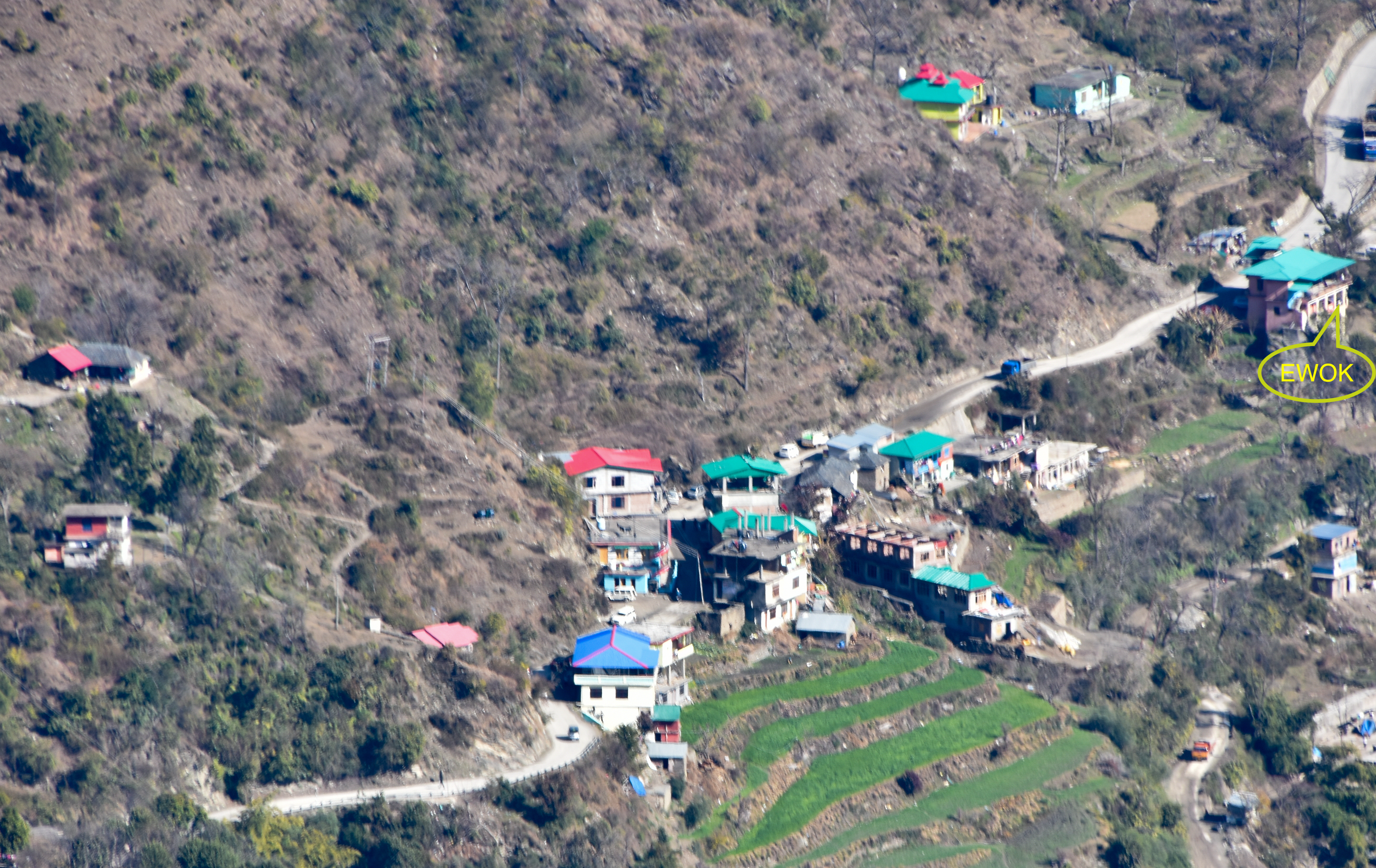
EWOK office, Salgi Village, Jan 2020 (marked in yellow near right edge)

In 2014, a student team from IIT Mandi conducted a survey of women in nearby villages. The study revealed that about 75% of them had not completed schooling (12th grade), limiting them to low paid, unskilled jobs. However, they showed a keen interest in being trained and guided. A lack of awareness, guidance and training has restricted the potential for growth and employment for local women. EWOK was formally started by IIT Mandi in April 2016. On 18 November 2019 EWOK was registered as a society under the Himachal Pradesh Societies Registration Act of 2006.

== Goals ==
EWOK aims to create an eco-system of women-centric entrepreneurship and employment in the Kamand valley of Himachal Pradesh. It focuses on imparting skills training to rural women to enable them to start village-scale businesses. Aiming to bridge the gap between academia, industry and the local community, EWOK has partnered with women from the four panchayats of Kamand, Kataula, Katindhi and Navlaya in Mandi District. EWOK's goals include: helping local women develop employable skills and get better access to relevant information; building a network to bring information on employment and training opportunities to local women, and to connect them to potential employers; and, to enhance the language and communication skills of women, along with their computer proficiency and general professional skills and confidence.

== Achievements ==
In May 2017, the Government of Himachal Pradesh awarded EWOK a grant of Rs. 30 lakhs in order to support entrepreneurship in the region.

In March 2020, IIT Mandi and EWOK signed an agreement with the National Bank for Agriculture and Rural Development (NABARD) to set up 3 farmer producer organisations in Mandi District over a 3-year period. NABARD provided Rs. 35 lakhs funding for this purpose. Each of the FPOs specialises in certain crops and value addition. EWOK provides them with technical and other assistance, in collaboration with IIT Mandi. On 7 June 2022, EWOK conducted a training session on tagetes cultivation during which seeds were distributed to 60 farmers. Oil is extracted from the tagetes seeds using an extraction unit from CSIR-IHBT, Palampur.

So far, EWOK has incubated over 12 start-ups generating employment for over 60 rural women. EWOK publishes regular newsletters with a summary of its activities.
