= Ramesh Chand Sawhney =

Ramesh Chand Sawhney being known by the abbreviation R. C. Sawhney, is an Indian scientist. He was the first full-time registrar of the Indian Institute of Technology Mandi, India from 19 July 2010 to 18 July 2014. He is emeritus professor and former director of life sciences of Defence Research and Development Organization (DRDO), India.
