= Namo Drone Didi Scheme =

Indian welfare scheme

- Type of project: Employment
- Country: India
- Prime Minister(s): Narendra Modi
- Launched: November 2023; 2 years ago
- Status: Active

Namo Drone Didi Scheme (Hindi: नमो ड्रोन दीदी योजना) Is an initiative launched by the Government of India.

== Background ==
The Namo Drone Didi Scheme was launched by Prime Minister Narendra Modi through video conferencing on 30 November 2023. Under the Drone Didi scheme, the government will spend Rs 1,261 crore. Drones will be provided to 15,000 women self-help groups with this money. This scheme will be implemented through Krishi Vigyan Kendras (KVKs) across the country.

== Implementation ==
- In January 2024, IIT Mandi's iHub and HCI Foundation launched 'Drone Didi', an entrepreneurship development program recognized by National Skill Development Corporation (NSDC). The aim is to train women of Himachal Pradesh drone operation skills with a specific focus on agri-drone applications. President Droupadi Murmu applauded the program calling it success of the Drone Didi scheme.
- In February 2024, IIT Guwahati launched India's largest drone pilot training center in a 18-acre area. DGCA will issue Remote Pilot Certificate (RPC) to students completing the training program.
- In May 2024, Ministry of Skill Development and Entrepreneurship (MSDE) signed an MoU with Mahindra & Mahindra to start training centers in Hyderabad and Noida. The goal is to skill 500 women. Every batch will have only 20 women and will go through a 15-day curriculum as guided by the Directorate General of Civil Aviation (DGCA).
