= Pt. Jawahar Lal Nehru Government Medical College and Hospital, Chamba =

Pandit Jawahar Lal Nehru Government Medical College and Hospital
- Motto: Help Ever Hurt Never
- Type: Public
- Established: 2017; 9 years ago
- Affiliations: Atal Medical and Research University
- Principal: Dr. Pankaj Gupta
- Students: 600
- Location: Chamba, Himachal Pradesh, India; 32.557°N 76.125°E
- Campus: Urban
- Nickname: GMCH Chamba
- Website: www.gmcchamba.edu.in

Pt. Jawahar Lal Nehru Government Medical College and Hospital Chamba located in Chamba district was upgraded to a Medical College in 2017.

== Course ==
Chamba Medical College undertakes the education and training of students MBBS courses.
