= Kamand, Mandi district =

Kamand
- Village
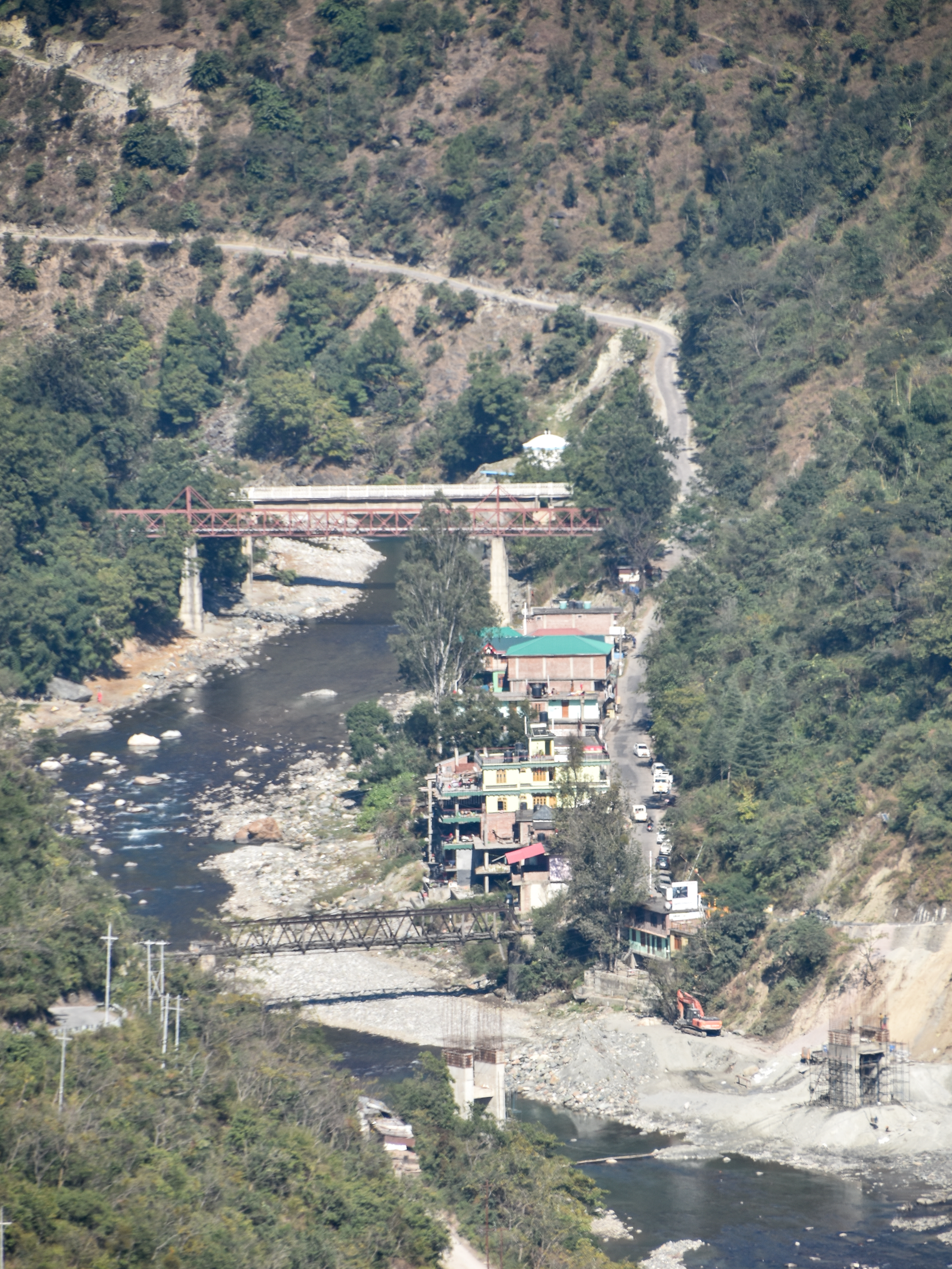
- Kamand village, Mandi (H.P) on left bank of Uhl River

- Location within Himachal Pradesh
- Coordinates: 31.7781°N 76.9974°E
- Country: India
- State: Himachal Pradesh
- District: Mandi

Government
  - Type: Panchayati raj
  - Body: Kamand Gram Panchayat

Population (2011)
  - Total: 29

Languages
  - Official: Mandeali, Hindi
- Time zone: UTC+5:30 (IST)
- Postal Index Number: 175075
- Vehicle registration: HP-
- Website: hpmandi.nic.in

Kamand (also spelled Kmaand) is a small village in Development Block Mandi-Sadr, Mandi district, Himachal Pradesh, India. The village is situated on the left bank of the Uhl River. It is located on MDR23 Mandi-Bajaura Road, at a distance of 15 kilometres (9.3 mi) from Mandi town. The South Campus of IIT Mandi borders Kamand and the entrance to the campus branches off from MDR23 here. The Kamand Gram Panchayat is a local self-governance body that covers Kamand and 6 other villages.

== Description ==
Kamand is located on MDR23 Mandi-Bajaura Road, at a distance of 15 kilometres (9.3 mi) from Mandi town. MDR23 continues on to Bajaura, connecting to Kullu, a distance of 51 kilometres (32 mi) from Kamand. The village has an area of 248.4 hectares (614 acres).

Crops grown in surrounding farms include corn, wheat, potato, red kidney beans (rajma), black-eyed peas (rongi). A number of businesses cater to the IIT Mandi community. These include provision and supply shops, restaurants, petrol bunk, services, lodges for students, staff and contractors, etc. Kamand has a Sub Post Office (Delivery Office) with pincode 175075.

== History ==
Until 2010, Kamand was a small agrarian village with traditional houses built of dry stone walls and slate roofs. During 2010–2020, with the development of IIT Mandi, Kamand has grown rapidly and now has many multi-storey cement concrete buildings. Several businesses have blossomed, catering to the construction and other needs of IIT Mandi and to the students and campus residents.

== Demographics ==
The population as of the 2011 Census was 29 with 8 households. Scheduled Castes comprise between 11 and 20% and Scheduled Tribes between 31 and 40%. The main religions are Hinduism. The languages are Mandeali and Hindi. A small but growing number of people are able to converse in English due to the influence of the diverse IIT Mandi community.

== Transport ==
Public and private buses and private vans ply regularly between Mandi and various villages in the Kamand valley, passing through Kamand. A few buses pass through en route from Mandi to Bajaura and Kullu.

== Education ==
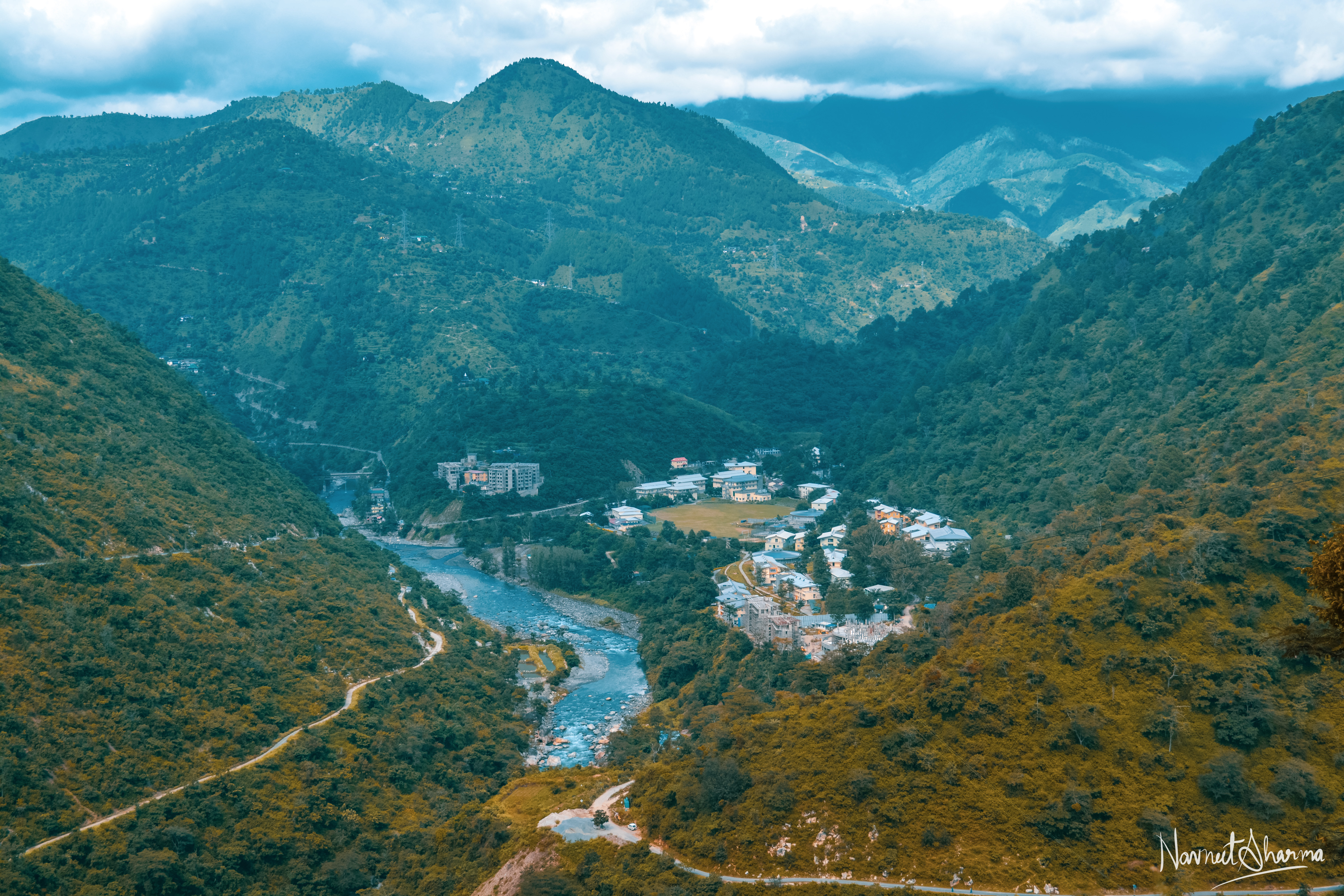
South Campus of IIT Mandi, Kamand on the left. Sep '20

A government primary, middle and secondary school caters to children from surrounding villages. IIT Mandi is an institute of national importance offering bachelors, masters and PhD in engineering, and masters and PhD in sciences and humanities. The South Campus of IIT Mandi borders Kamand. Students come from all parts of India and from some foreign countries.

== Governance (Gram Panchayat) ==
The Kamand Gram Panchayat is a government office and local self-government body that governs the village of Kamand and 6 nearby villages in Mandi Sadar Development Block of District Mandi in the state of Himachal Pradesh, India. Kamand GP falls in the Darang Assembly Constituency and the Mandi Parliamentary Constituency. The Gram Panchayat is located at 31.7781°N 76.9974°E in Kamand village on MDR23 Mandi-Bajaura Road. The 7 villages have a total population of 2,416 as of the 2011 Census.

=== Pradhans ===
SL No.	Pradhan Name	Term
1	Reeta Devi	2016-2021
2	Bhim Dev	2021-(2026)

=== Villages ===
The Kamand Gram Panchayat covers 7 villages.

Village name	Polling Station No.	Type
Arnehar	1	Rural
Dangahar	2	Rural
Kamand	3	Rural
Kathachi	4	Rural
Kutahar	5	Rural
Khanahr	6	Rural
DPF Shara Mohar	7	Rural

== Gallery ==
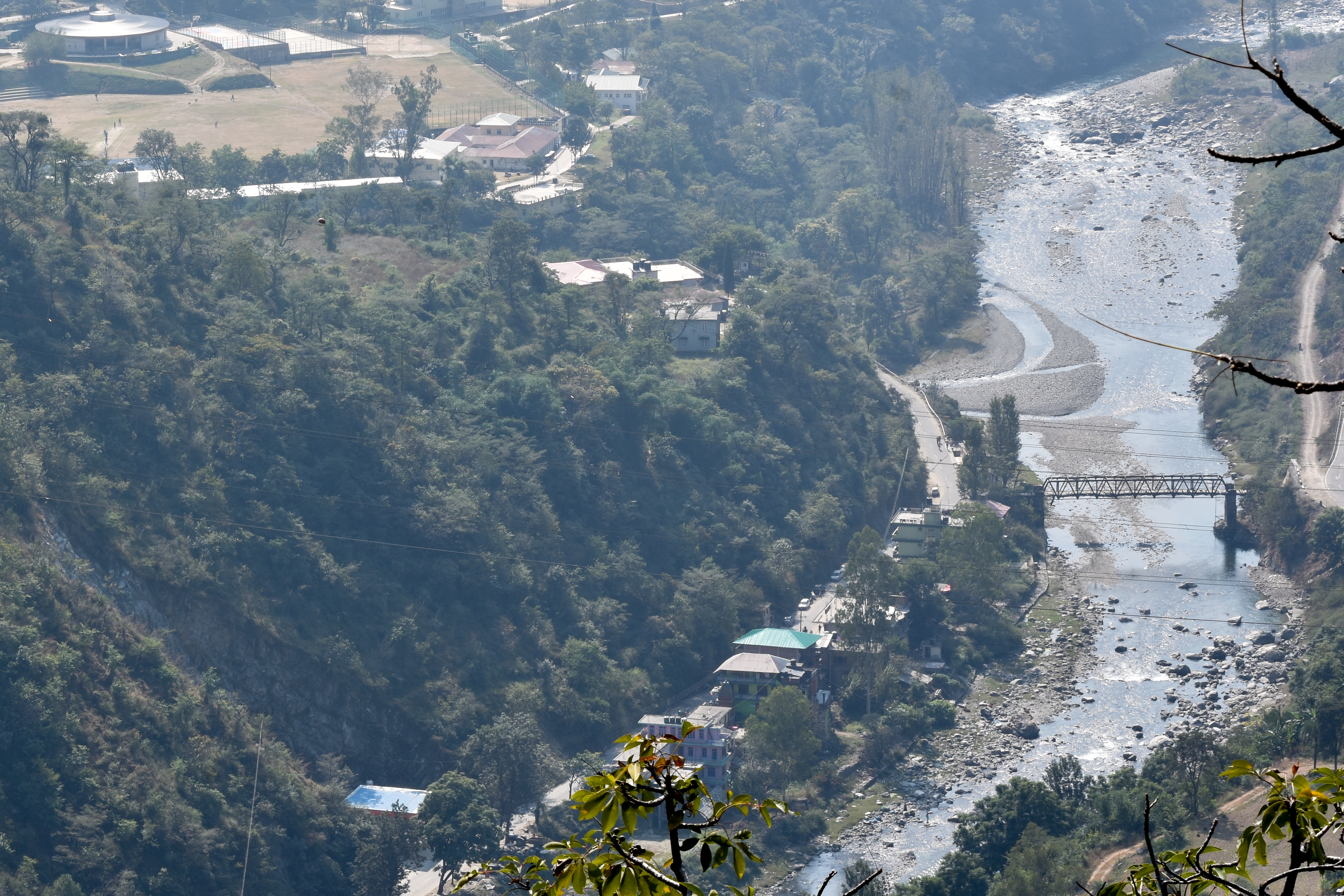
Kamand on the Uhl, IIT Mandi South Campus. Oct '17

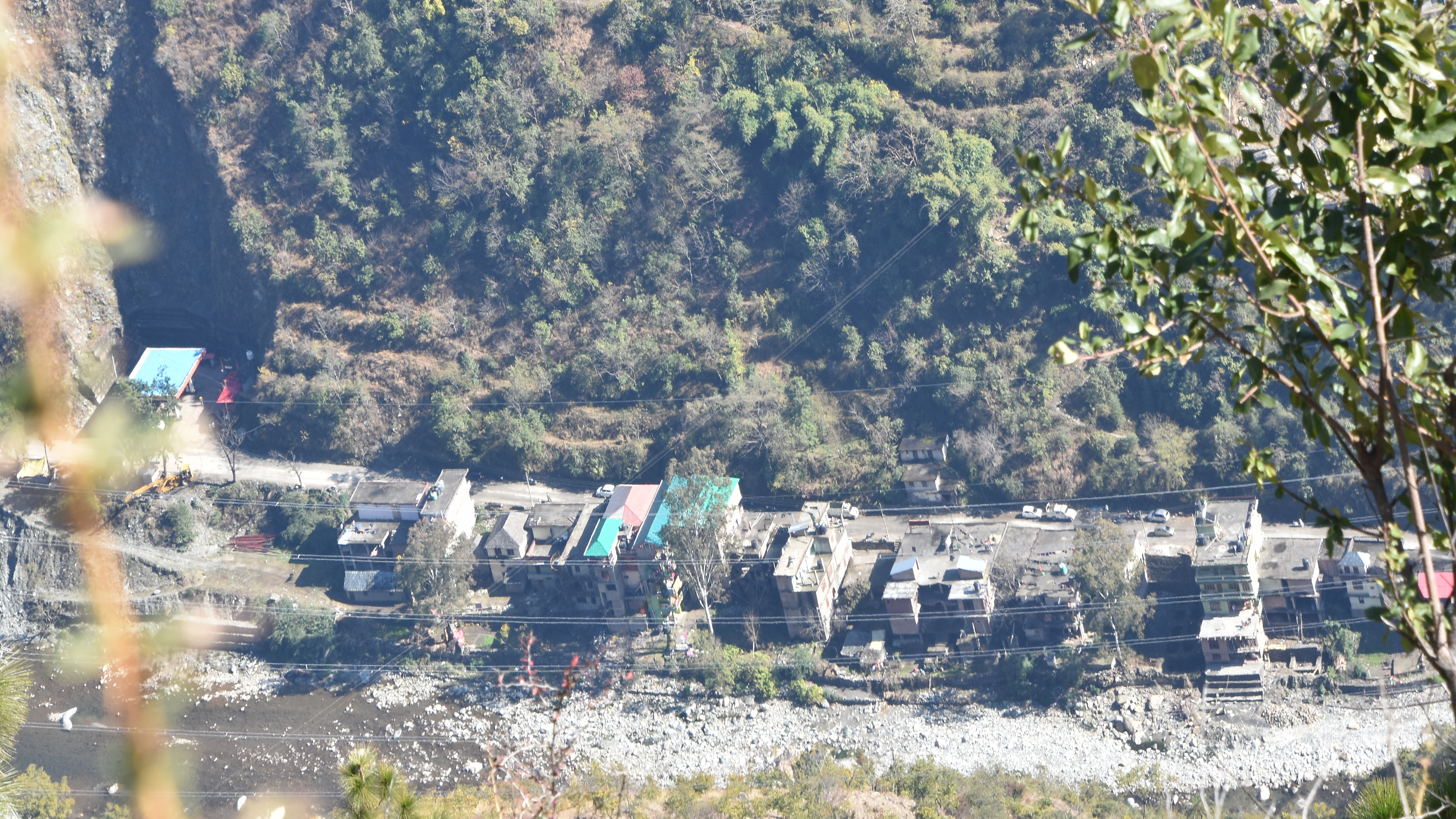
Birds-eye view of Kamand from Griffon Peak. Jan '20

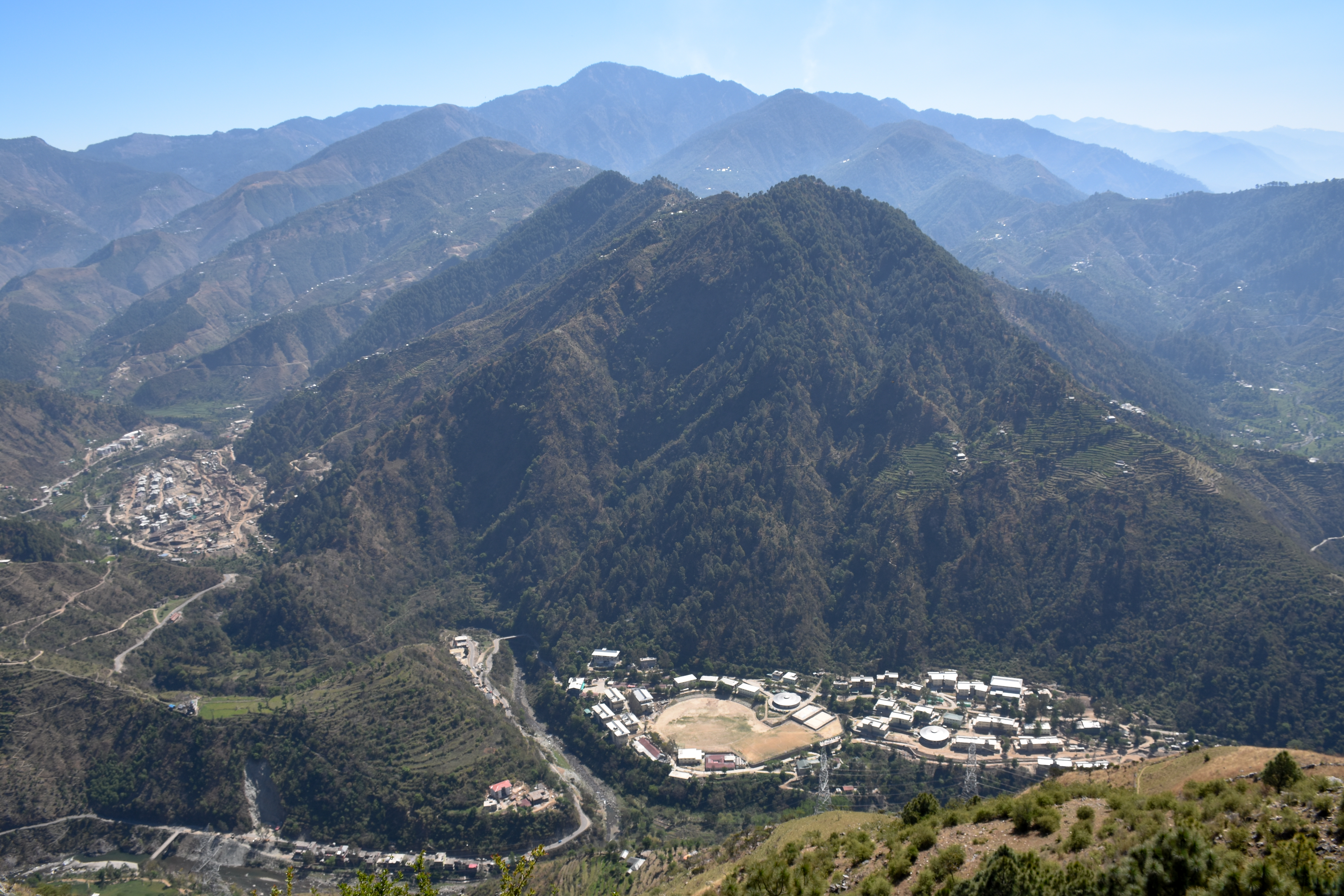
IIT Mandi and Kamand from Griffon Peak. Apr '17

== See also ==
- IIT Mandi
