= IIT Mandi =

Research Institute in HP, India

Indian Institute of Technology Mandi
- Other name: IITMD
- Motto: Scaling the heights!
- Type: Public technical university
- Established: 2009; 17 years ago
- Chairman: Lt. Gen. Kanwal Jeet Singh Dhillon (Retd.)
- Director: Laxmidhar Behera
- Faculty: 197
- Students: 2,343
- Undergraduates: 1201
- Postgraduates: 602
- Doctoral students: 540
- Location: Mandi, Himachal Pradesh, India; 31°46′18″N 76°59′01″E
- Campus: 538 acres (218 ha); Rural
- Colors: Orange Green Blue
- Website: iitmandi.ac.in

- Location in Himachal Pradesh Location in India

Indian Institute of Technology Mandi (IIT Mandi or IITMd) is one of the eight new Indian Institutes of Technology (IITs) located in Kamand Valley, Mandi district of Himachal Pradesh, India. Established by the Ministry of Human Resource Development, Government of India in 2009, it is one of the Institutes of National Importance of India.

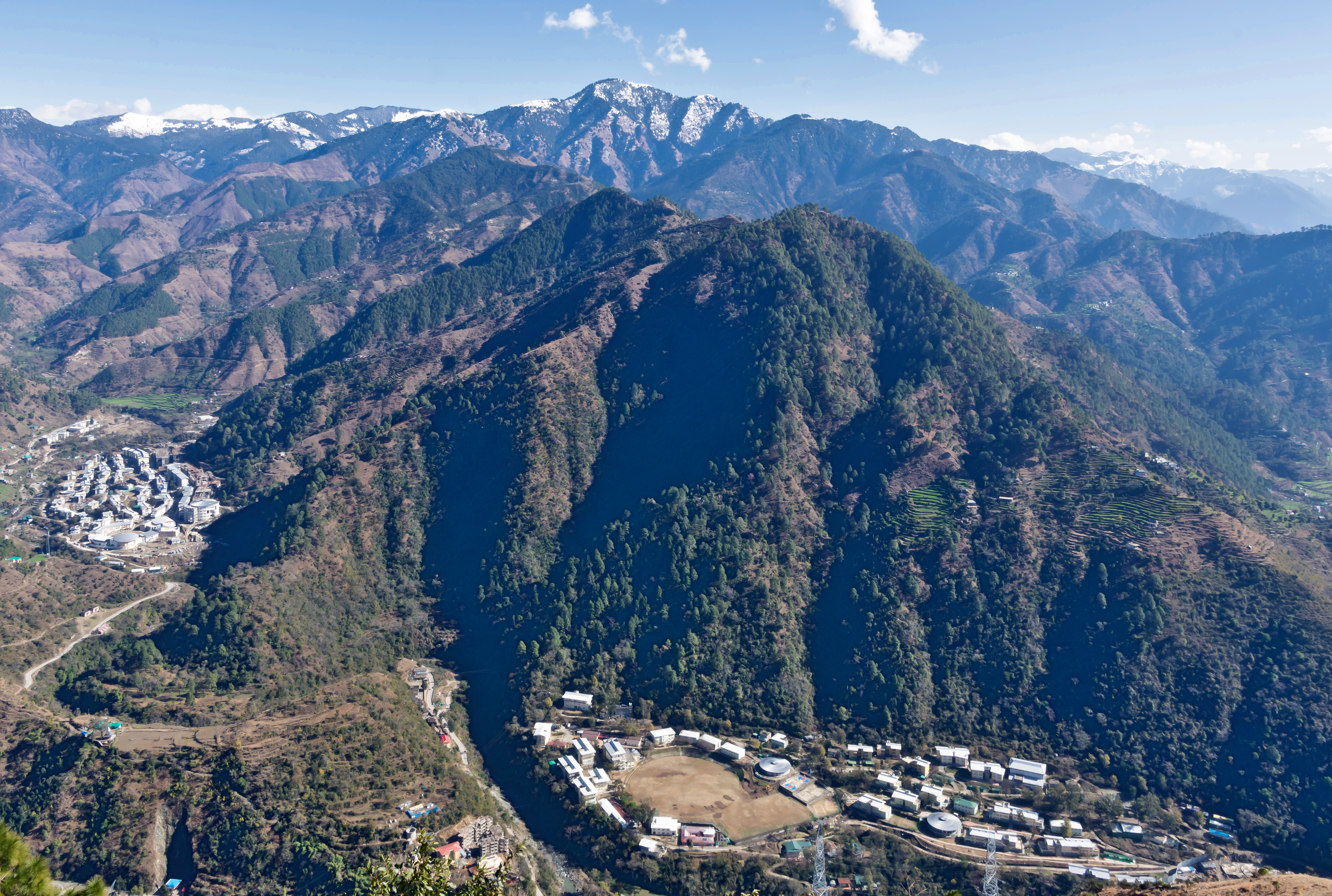
View of IIT Mandi campus from Griffon Peak, Jan 2020. South Campus in front right, North Campus in left middle.

== History ==
IIT Mandi's permanent campus, about 14 km (8.7 mi) from Mandi, consists of the South and North campuses connected by a narrow neck. The South campus is on the left bank of the Uhl River below Kamand village. The North campus is along the Kataula Khad (stream) opposite Salgi village.

The Foundation Stone was laid on 24 February 2009 and the institution was registered as a society in Uttarakhand on 20 June 2009. The first batch of 97 students were admitted in July 2009 with classes starting in IIT Roorkee, the mentoring IIT, on 27 July 2009.

A transit campus at Government Postgraduate College, Mandi was handed over by the Himachal Pradesh Government on 16 November 2009.

Timothy A. Gonsalves was the founding Director, and R. C. Sawhney, serving as the first Registrar.

The institute became an IIT under The Institutes of Technology (Amendment) Act, 2011, with the intention to expand the reach and to enhance the quality of technical education in the country. The Act was passed in the Lok Sabha on 24 March 2011 and by the Rajya Sabha on 30 April 2012.

The Kamand campus ground-breaking ceremony, to mark the start of construction, was held on 13 April 2012.

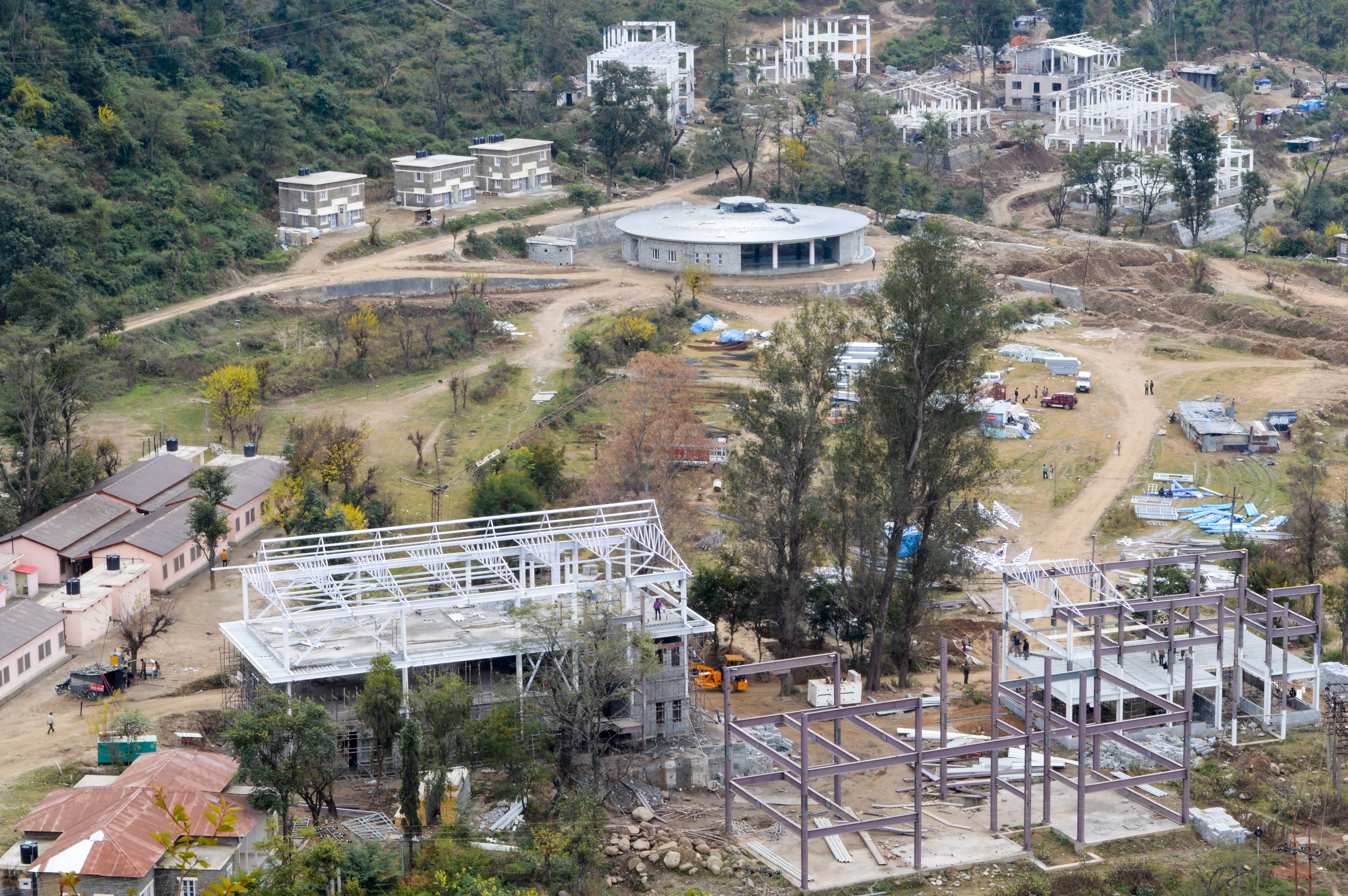
Construction in the South Campus, Dec '12

On 25 April 2015, IIT Mandi became the first of all the new IITs to completely shift B. Tech students to its permanent campus in Kamand, Mandi.

== Campus ==
IIT Mandi was established in 2009 on 538 acres (218 ha) of land near the Uhl, approximately 460 kilometres (290 mi) from New Delhi. The campus is divided into the North and South campuses. Transport and communication facilities connect the two campuses for students, staff and faculty.

Sports, co-curricular and extra-curricular activities are also of high importance for the institute. In addition to the existing indoor badminton courts, swimming pool, table tennis hall, football and cricket fields and gymnasium, the institute has a pavilion, a hockey ground with kiosk, and tennis, volleyball and basketball courts. The institute has a medical unit in the South campus and a Health Care Center with 3 Medical officers, an ENT specialist, and a Pediatrician, in the North campus. It also includes a Procedure Room, a Minor Operation Theatre and Physiotherapy Center.

The institute has also set up within its campus important support services, such as creches, a botanical garden with a rich diversity of local plants, children's parks, stationery shops, a campus school, canteens, cafes, banks and ATMs, for the convenience of campus residents. Library and book-nooks are also present in both North and South Campus. The auditorium is used for various occasions and programs organized at IIT Mandi.

=== Green activities ===
Efficient waste-management practices are held in high priority for the campus. The waste generated at each source is segregated through the active participation of residents. A Bio-gas generator of 150 kg (330 lb) feed capacity has been installed for the digestion of biodegradable wastes. Sewage Treatment Plants have been set up to ensure that all waste-water generated in the campus gets suitably treated before discharge and reuse. Special efforts have also been put towards the identification of local flora and fauna, and in ensuring that the campus growth continues to be in harmony with them. Future plans include reuse of treated waste-water, development of plant nursery, better segregation and in-house composting.

IIT Mandi was honored with the Prestigious Green University Award in COP 28, UAE. The award was conferred by Green Mentors, an NGO holding special consultative status with the United Nations Economic and Social Council (ECOSOC) in the United States. Institute's goal is to reduce greenhouse gas emissions and achieve zero carbon emissions within the next 10 years.

=== South Campus ===
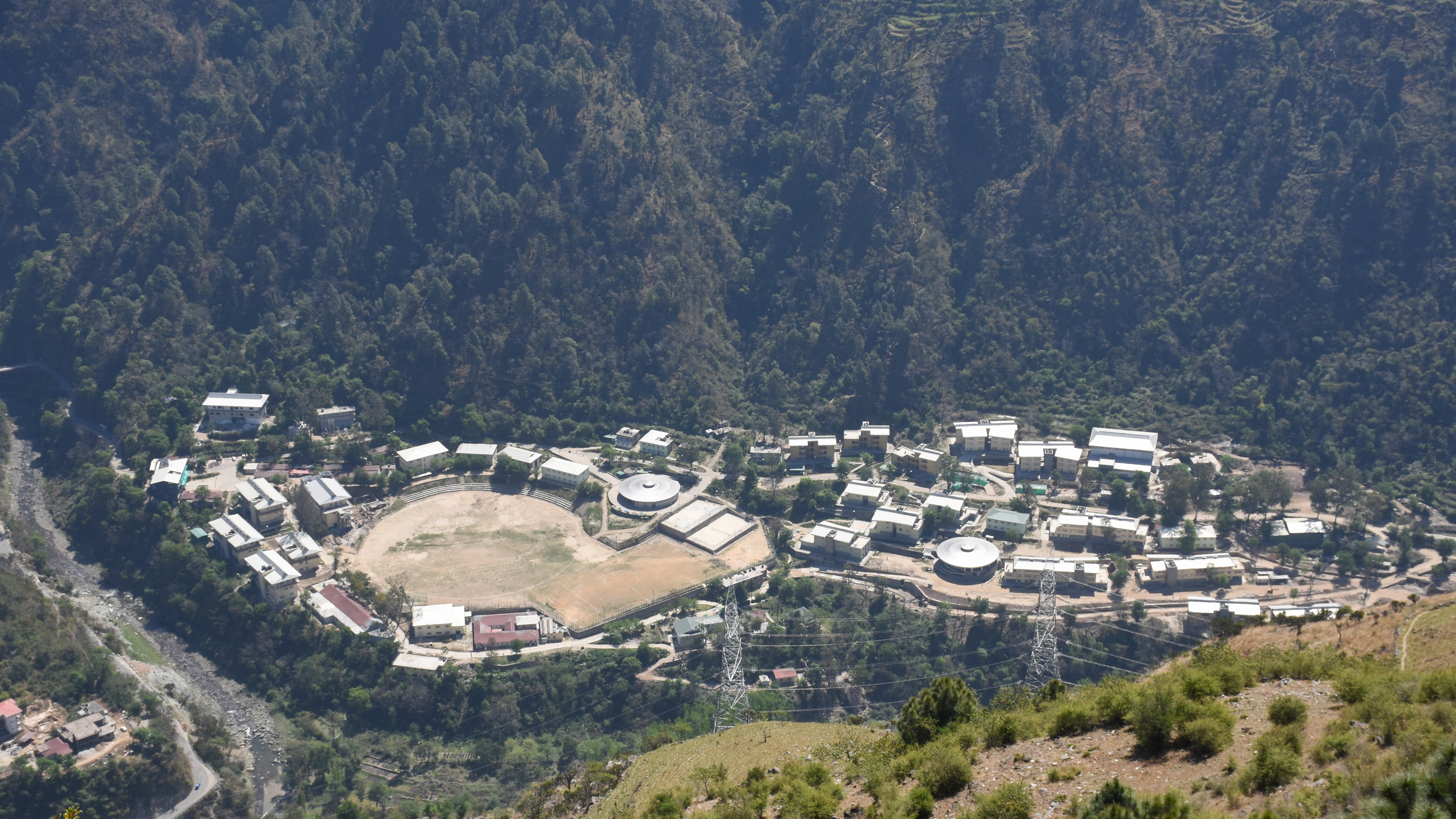
South Campus from Griffon Peak, Apr 2017

The South Campus is bordered by the Uhl River on the west, Kamand village on the north and Kahra village on the east. IIT Mandi was the first among all the new IITs to shift residential and academic facilities on the main (South) campus. A Faculty and Staff Recreation Club in the South Campus was also inaugurated on 29 October 2016. The master plan for the complete development of the campus is ready and intends to cater for 5000 students, 600 faculty and associated staff.

=== North Campus ===
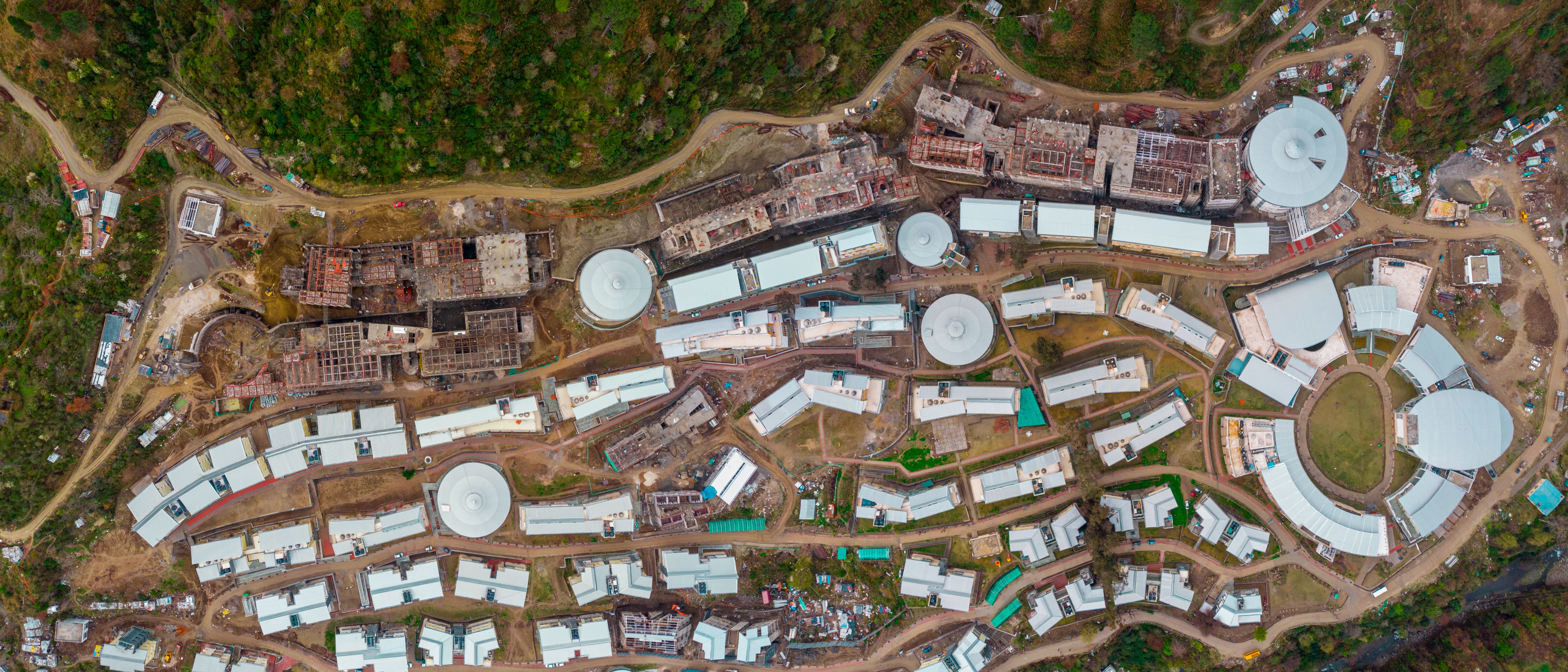
Top View of North Campus

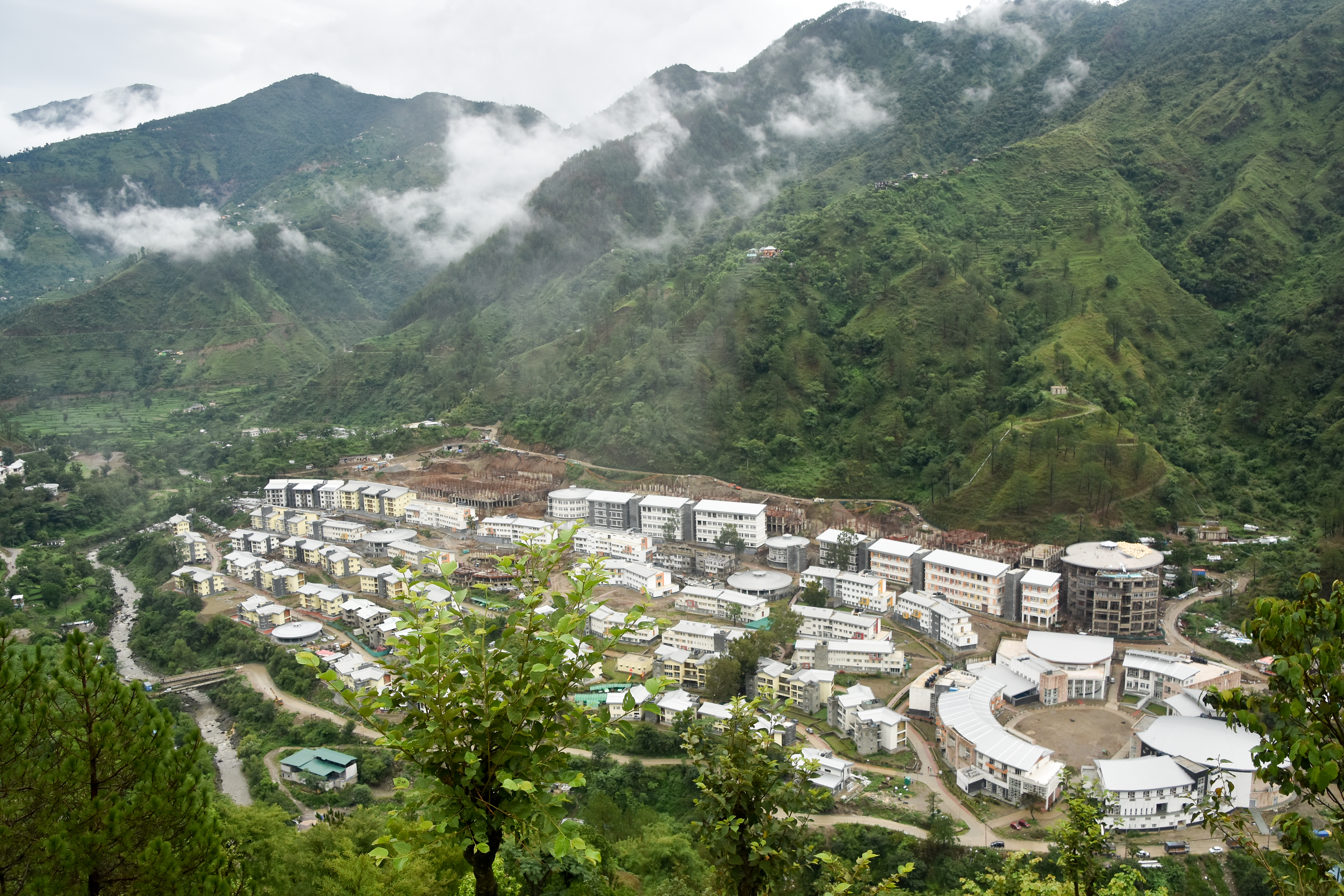
North Campus

The North Campus is to host all the students in the long run (with the South Campus catering to the residential and research requirements of the research scholars). At present, all the undergraduate students reside in the North Campus, with some of the postgraduates students also living here.

== Schools and centers ==
The institute primarily consists of faculty, project associates and students divided across several schools. Currently there are nine schools and 9 centres operational in IIT Mandi.

=== Schools ===
- School of Management (SoM)
- School of Mathematical and Statistical Sciences (SMSS)
- School of Computing and Electrical Engineering (SCEE)
- School of Biosciences and Bioengineering (SBB)
- School of Civil and Environmental Engineering (SCENE)
- School of Chemical Sciences (SCS)
- School of Mechanical and Materials Engineering (SMME)
- School of Physical Sciences (SPS)
- School of Humanities and Social Sciences (SHSS)

=== Centres ===
- Centre for Continuing Education (CCE)
- Centre for Design & Fabrication of Electronic Device (C4DFED)
- Centre for Artificial Intelligence and Robotics (CAIR)
- Centre for Human-Computer Interaction(CHCI)
- BioX Centre
- Indian Knowledge System and Mental Health Applications Centre(IKSMHA)
- Advance Material Research Centre (AMRC)
- Center for Quantum Science and Technologies (CQST)
- Centre for Promotion of Additive Manufacturing

== Organization and administration ==
=== IIT Mandi Catalyst ===
IIT Mandi Catalyst is the first technology business incubator (TBI) in Himachal Pradesh. It was inaugurated by Prof Ashok Jhunjhunwala on 15 May 2016. IIT Mandi Catalyst offers a low-cost, high-tech, yet peaceful and picturesque destination to early-stage startups. The Solar Labs was the first incubated and funded company. It was founded in 2017 by a fresh B. Tech graduate Siddarth Gangal. IIT Mandi Catalyst has incubated over 350 startups.

=== Enabling Women of Kamand (EWOK) ===
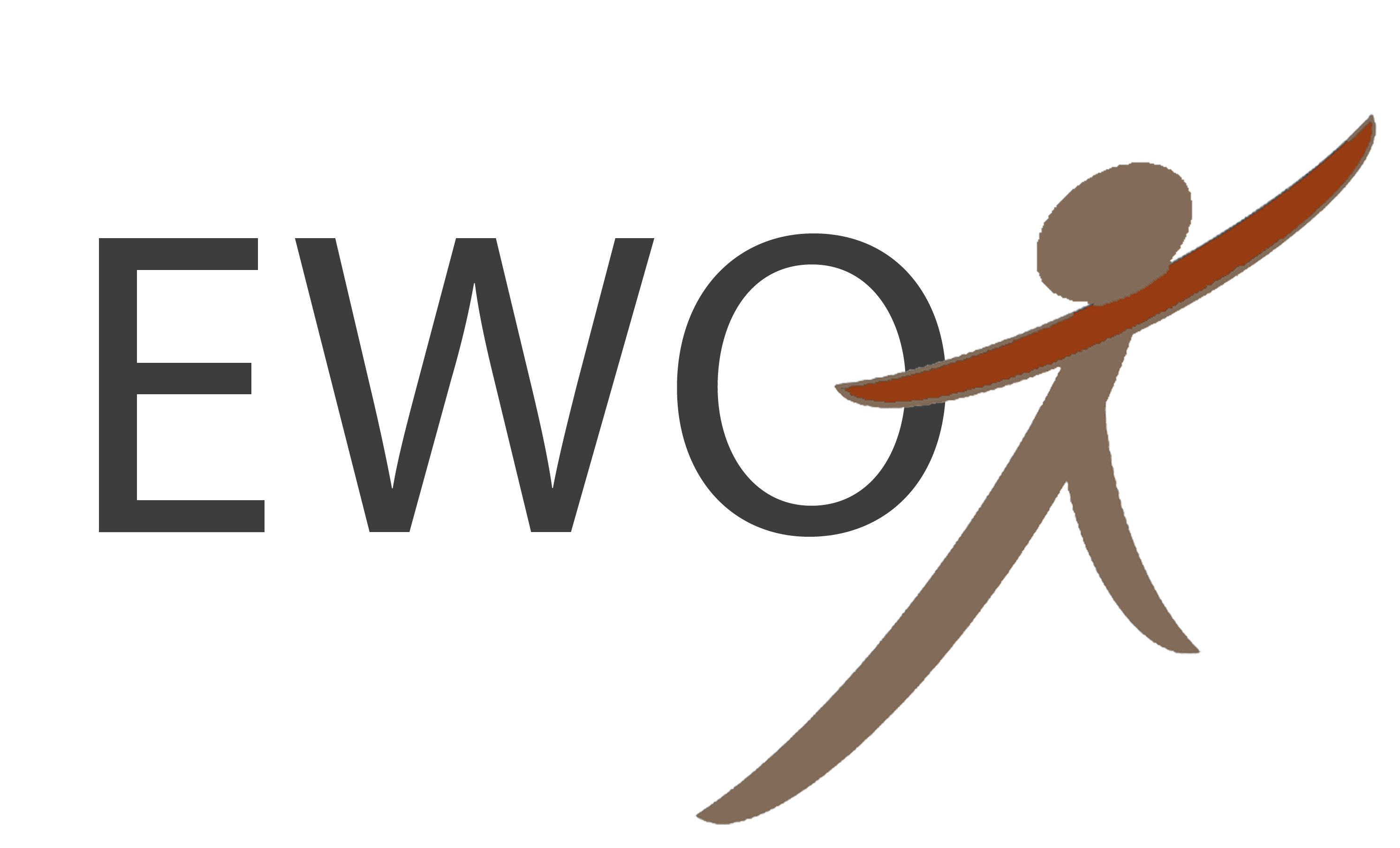
Enabling Women of Kamand (EWOK)

Enabling Women of Kamand (EWOK) is an innovative programme started by IIT Mandi in May 2016. It focuses on imparting skills training to rural women to enable them to start village-scale businesses. EWOK has partnered with women from the four panchayats of Kamand, Kataula, Katindhi and Navlaya in Mandi district.

=== IIT Mandi iHub and HCi Foundation ===
Incorporated on 24 September 2020, IIT Mandi iHub and HCi Foundation is a Section 8 not-for-profit Technology Innovation Hub (TIH) established by IIT Mandi under India's National Mission on Interdisciplinary Cyber-Physical Systems (NM-ICPS), funded by the Department of Science and Technology, Government of India. The Hub is one of 25 Technology Innovation Hubs set up across the country under NM-ICPS to accelerate research and innovation in emerging technology domains. The iHub focuses on Human-Computer Interaction (HCi) and operates across four verticals: research and development, skill development, industry partnerships, and startup incubation and acceleration.

==== MI-RA Laboratory ====
The MI-RA Laboratory (Multimodal Intelligence for Real-World Applications) is a research facility established by IIT Mandi iHub and HCi Foundation on the IIT Mandi campus, focused on human-centric multimodal AI research. The laboratory was inaugurated on 30 March 2026 at the HIVE 3.0 conclave by Kris Gopalakrishnan, Co-Founder of Infosys and Chairman of the Mission Governing Board of NM-ICPS, who described the lab as ensuring that India becomes a creator rather than merely a consumer of AI technology.

The lab addresses the limited availability of synchronized, India-centric multimodal datasets covering Indian faces, voices, languages, and everyday contexts, which are largely underrepresented in global AI training corpora. Its primary hardware is a volumetric capture rig, an egg-shaped steel chassis housed within an anechoic chamber, equipped with 16 Blackmagic cameras, precision microphones, OptiTrack motion capture systems, and biosensors including EMG and EDA, capable of capturing synchronized video, spatial audio, and physiological data from a human subject simultaneously. Supporting infrastructure includes a dedicated Capture Room, Dark Room, UX Labs, and Multi-Sensor Room, which allow controlled experiments across varying lighting and environmental conditions.

The laboratory works towards building large-scale, annotated Indian multimodal datasets intended to serve a role similar to ImageNet in computer vision, providing training ground truth for next-generation AI systems. Research applications include robotics, healthcare and rehabilitation, neurological monitoring, media and entertainment, AR/VR, and surveillance. The laboratory is funded through the NM-ICPS grant to IIT Mandi iHub in the domain of Human-Centred AI, under the Department of Science and Technology, Government of India.

==== Skill Development and Social Impact ====
iHub has launched the Drone Didi programme as part of the Indian government's Namo Drone Didi Scheme, an entrepreneurship development initiative training women of Himachal Pradesh as drone operators with a focus on agri-drone applications. The programme is recognised by the National Skill Development Corporation (NSDC). The first batch, which started in 2024, comprised 20 female participants. The Drone Didi programme was showcased to President Droupadi Murmu at the inauguration of Kaushal Bhavan in January 2024. The programme has been featured in the Stanford Social Innovation Review as a model for women-led drone entrepreneurship in India.

== Academics ==
IIT Mandi like all the other Indian Institutes of Technology, conducts various programs including bachelor's degree in technology (B.Tech.) and is also in the list of the few IITs which has its own postgraduate management program MBA offered by School of Management. It also offers postgraduate level programs such as Master of Science and Master of Science (Research). Further, it also offers a Ph.D. program for cutting-edge research in basics sciences such as chemical sciences, physical sciences as well as in disciplines of engineering. The academic year is organized between two semester a year. IIT Mandi follows a 10-point CGPA scale, with a rigorous examination procedure consisting of two mid-semester examinations called Quizzes and an end-semester exam. Apart from that, the courses may involve short projects, term-papers, self-study assignments, tutorials, and regular surprise quizzes.

=== Undergraduate programs ===
Currently(2022–2023), IIT Mandi offers Bachelor of Technology (B. Tech) programs in six disciplines namely:

- Civil engineering
- Computer science and engineering
- Data science and engineering
- Electrical engineering
- Engineering physics
- Mechanical engineering
- Mathematics and Computing
- Microelectronics & VLSI
- General Engineering
- Materials Science and Engineering
- BS in Chemical Sciences

The institute also offers a dual-degree program (B. Tech. – M. Tech.) in the following discipline :

- Bio-engineering

Like all the other IITs, admissions to these programs are done on the basis of merit list of JEE-Advanced, the second phase examination of Joint Entrance Examination (JEE), which is an all India engineering entrance examination.

The School of Management at IIT Mandi has recently started Five Year Integrated Master of Business Administration (IMBA). After successful completion of the five years of the IMBA program, the students shall be awarded two separate degrees (i) BBA Analytics (Honors) and (ii) MBA (Data Science & Artificial Intelligence).

- BBA Analytics (as a part of IMBA)

==== Female enrollment in B.Tech ====
The Indian Institute of Technology, Mandi, has successfully achieved the target of female enrollment in undergraduate courses by admitting 20.22 percent female students to B. Tech. program for the Academic Year 2019–20. This stands favorably with the target of 17 percent set by the Joint Entrance Examination (JEE) Apex Board Committee for 2019–20. A total of 262 students were admitted to IIT Mandi this year in B. Tech. courses, out of which 53 are girls and 209 are boys as compared to 38 girls and 158 boys last year. A total of 103 students have been admitted this year in the M.Sc. courses, of which 36 are girls and 67 are boys. For the Academic Year 2020–2021 a total of 330 students have been admitted in B. Tech. Courses out of which 68 are girls and 262 are boys which gives a 20.61 percent female ratio in B. Tech. this year.

Data regarding the number of women taking admission:

Female Enrollment in B. Tech
Year	No. of Female Students
2015	8
2016	6
2017	22
2018	38
2019	53
2020	68
2021	64

=== Postgraduate programs ===
IIT Mandi also offers postgraduate programs like M. Tech, M. Tech. (by Research), M.Sc., and M.A under various departments. Currently, IIT Mandi offers M.S. program in the field of basic sciences, M. Tech (by Research) program in the field of engineering, M.A program in Development Studies, M.Sc. program in Physics, Chemistry, Mathematics, and M. Tech program in CSE, CSP, VLSI, Energy Systems, Materials, Fluid and Thermal, Structural Engineering, and Biotechnology. For any candidate to be eligible for admission, he/she must have a bachelor's degree in Engineering / Technology or master's degree in appropriate Sciences with a valid score in GATE or equivalent national level examination or GRE in appropriate discipline. Shortlisted candidates are called for a personal interview and based on which admission is offered.

School of Management, IIT Mandi offers Master of Business Administration MBA in Data science and Artificial Intelligence. This course was started in the year 2022.To be eligible for the admission process, the candidate either have a valid CAT score or have studied with good academic grades from top 100 NIRF colleges or Centrally Funded Technical Institutes (CFTIs). All applicants must have studied mathematics at +2 level (or equivalent)

IIT Mandi also offers Ph.D. programs in the field of engineering and basic sciences. To be eligible for admission process, the candidate must have a master's degree in sciences with a good academic record and a valid GATE score or UGC/CSIR NET/ Master's degree in Engineering/Technology with a good academic record/ B. Tech degree of any IIT with a minimum of CGPA of 8.0 on a 10.0 point scale or with a valid GATE Score or B. Tech / B.E degree of any recognized University in India with a minimum CGPA of 8.0 on a 10.0 point scale or equivalent with valid GATE score.

=== Strategic partnerships ===
IIT Mandi has strategic partnerships with prominent universities worldwide, including members of the TU9 consortium in Germany, institutions in Norway, Japan, the United States of America, and France. These collaborations facilitate long-term research engagements between IIT Mandi's faculty and their counterparts at institutions such as TU9 in Germany, NTNU in Norway, Kyushu University in Japan, and Missouri S&T in the USA. In addition to research collaborations, these partnerships also foster academic cooperation, including student exchange programs and joint degree initiatives.

==== WPI, United States ====
IIT Mandi has a collaboration program with many foreign universities. Students from WPI, United States come at IIT Mandi to work with IIT Mandi students on 'Interdisciplinary Socio-technical Practicum (ISTP)'. Through the ISTP, students explore the various issues/problems of society, and they propose technology-based solutions for these, and evaluate the proposed solutions from social, technical, economical, environmental and other aspects.

=== Ranking ===
University rankings

Engineering – India
- NIRF (2024): 31

It was ranked 31st among engineering colleges in India by the National Institutional Ranking Framework in 2024. It was ranked 15th among 23 IITs according to NIRF 2024.

== Research ==
IIT Mandi nurtures an interdisciplinary research environment that develops innovative technologies for widespread use. Driven by the need of the region and the nation, the thrust areas have been identified and organized.

Recently the Indian Institute of Technology Mandi has made a significant breakthrough in the development of metal oxide layers for use in advanced architecture silicon solar cells.

Researchers from the institute also developed a new algorithm using Artificial Intelligence and Machine Learning (AI&ML) that could improve the accuracy of prediction for natural hazards.

In July 2024, under the Indian Knowledge Systems, IIT Mandi's Centre for Indian Knowledge System and Mental Health Application (IKSHMA) launched MS (research) And PhD programs in Music and Musopathy. The programs leverage the connection between music, technology, and health, and aim to help understand therapeutic values and science behind Indian music for the overall well-being of human body, mind, and consciousness.

=== Research centers ===
The Advanced Materials Research Centre (AMRC) has a focus on the environment and on agriculture particularly for traditional farmers who are engaged in the cultivation of fruits, vegetables, saffron and medicinal plants in this region. The Centre for Design & Fabrication of Electronic Devices (C4DFED) is an institute facility for multidisciplinary research of electronic device design and fabrication. The centre has Class 100, Class 1000 & Class 10000 laboratories where high-end sophisticated electronic device design, fabrication and characterisation tools worth INR 50 crore are installed.

IIT Mandi plans to set up a research park with a HEFA loan of INR 100 crore, along with an increase of faculty strength to over 300 and student strength to over 5000 in the next five years.

== Student life ==
=== Student Gymkhana and Societies ===
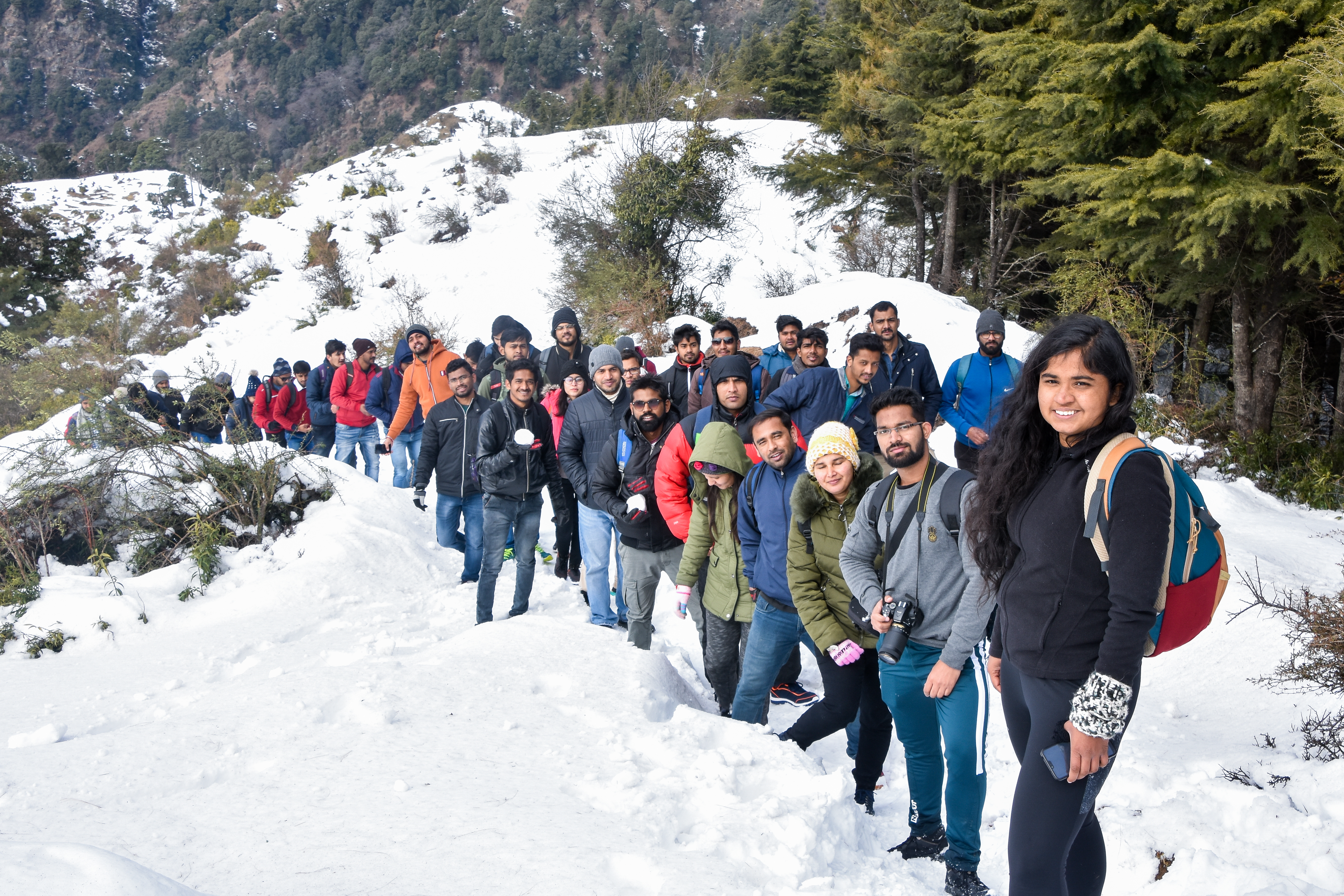
HTC trek in the snow at Kandi Pass, Jan '20

The Student Gymkhana is the student self-governance body. It invites student participation and acts as a bridge between the students and the faculty. It helps in the overall smooth functioning of all student-related activities. It also assists the students in participating in various student exchange programs and internships. Student activities at IIT Mandi are grouped into six different societies namely, Academic, Cultural, Literary, Research, Sports and Technical. Additional activities are grouped in General Affairs under the General Secretary.

The Technical Society includes KamandPrompt (The Programming Club), STAC (The Astronomy Club), Robotronics (The Robotics and Electronics Club), Nirman Club, Yantrik club and E-Cell.

Cultural Society includes Art Geeks (Art club), Music club, UDC (Dance club), Dramatics club, Designauts (Design Club), ShutterBugs (The Photography Club), and Perception (The Videography Club).

The Literary Society includes debate, quizzing and writing club of the college. Literary Society also publishes a yearly student's magazine by the name of Vivaan.

The Sports Society has a sports council which coordinates all the sports activities for Football, Cricket, Badminton, Lawn Tennis, Badminton, Table Tennis, Volleyball, Basketball, Hockey, Athletics, and Chess at Kamand Campus.

The Research Society includes IIT Mandi Research Club (IITMRC).

General Affairs includes the Hiking and Trekking Club (HTC).

During their first year, all under-graduate students are required to take part in one of three extra-curricular activities. These are the Sports Society, the National Service Scheme and the Hiking and Trekking Club.

=== Student festivals ===
==== Xpecto ====
Xpecto is the science and technology festival of IIT Mandi that includes technical events from various technical clubs.

==== Exodia ====
Exodia is the annual technical-cum-cultural fest of IIT Mandi. It is a three-day long event held towards the start of March. Started in 2012 by a bunch of enthusiast IITians, it is a student-run non-profit organization that caters primarily to the youth. Exodia '12 and Exodia '13 were set in the transit campus of IIT Mandi while later meetups were set on the permanent campus in Kamand.

==== Rann-Neeti ====
Rann-Neeti is the Annual Inter College Sports Fest of IIT Mandi organized by Student Gymkhana of IIT Mandi. It is a three-day long event held every year in the month of September where many Indian colleges participate.

==== AstraX ====
AstraX is the annual inter-college Astronomy meet of IIT Mandi organized by its Space Technology and Astronomy Cell. It observes keynote talks by international and national astrophysicists and astronomers, workshops on space technology and other events. Students from IITs, IISERs, NITs and many other colleges across India participate in the meet.

==== Ruvaan ====
Ruvaan is the annual inter-college Literary Fest of IIT Mandi jointly organized by Writing Club, Drama Club, Debating Club, and Quizzing Club (Literary Society). Started in 2020 as a three-day event, it covers a variety of events like Debates, Poetry-Slams, M.U.N., Drama, Quizzes, Movie Screenings, and Poet Conference.

==== FrostHack ====
FrostHack is an open hackathon organized by the student community of IIT Mandi with the goal of solving societal problems by collective collaboration among students using technology.

== Controversies ==
=== Religious, caste and ideological controversies ===
IIT Mandi has faced controversies over statements and activities regarding religion and caste. In 2023, the then director Laxmidhar Behera asked atudents to not eat meat and claimed that its consumption is the reason for environmental disasters like landslides and cloudbursts. He had also made similar statements before about "evil spirits".

In 2026, the institute's Janmashtami programme featured a Bhagavad Gita-themed poster that said Shudras should "serve higher classes". It caused controversies about casteism. The institute subsequently transferred the matter to the police for investigation.

The institute also faced criticism over the inclusion of religious and spiritual concepts like reincarnation, astrology, etc. in its academic and conference activities. IIT Mandi's 2026 Mind, Brain and Consciousness Conference had a session called "Reincarnation, OBEs and afterlife communication".

=== Ragging and student-discipline controversies ===
In September 2023, ragging of Junior students happened in the fresher's day event. IIT Mandi conducted an investigation following this and took disciplinary action against 72 students involved in it including suspension of 10 students for six months.

== See also ==
- Indian Institutes of Technology
- List of universities in India
- National Institutes of Technology
