= Sardar Patel University Mandi =

University of Himachal Pradesh

- सरदार पटेल विश्वविद्यालय मण्डी
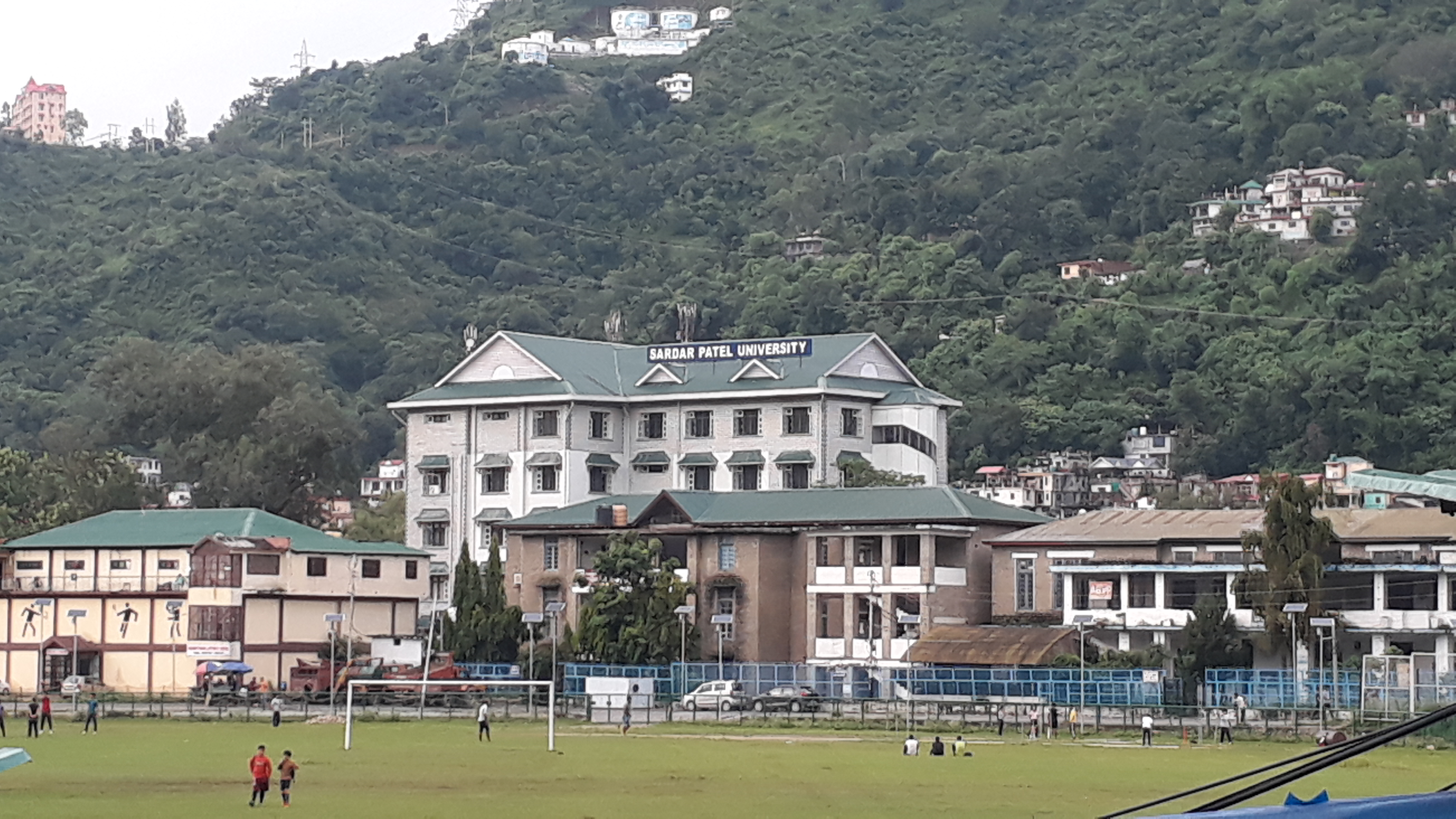
- Motto: न हि ज्ञानेन सदृशं पवित्रमिह विद्यते
- Motto in English: Indeed, there is nothing purifying here comparable to Knowledge.
- Type: Public
- Established: April 1, 2022; 4 years ago
- Affiliations: UGC, AIU, ACU, NAAC
- Chancellor: Governor of Himachal Pradesh
- Vice-Chancellor: Lalit Kumar Awasthi
- Location: Mandi, Himachal Pradesh, India
- Website: www.spumandi.ac.in

Sardar Patel University Mandi (formerly Sardar Vallabhbhai Patel Cluster University) is an Indian public state university located in the Mandi, Himachal Pradesh on the banks of river Beas. It was established by the Act No. 3 of 2022 of the Himachal Pradesh Legislative Assembly. Having jurisdiction over five districts Chamba,Kangra, Kullu, Lahaul-Spiti, Mandi this affiliating university provides affiliation to about 119 colleges and institutions.

It is located right next to Shaheed Kishan Chand Memorial Stadium, locally known as Paddal Ground.
