= List of protected areas of Himachal Pradesh =

Forests in the state of Himachal Pradesh (northern India) currently cover an area of nearly 37,939 square kilometres (14,648 sq mi), which is about 68.16% of the total land area of the state. The forests were once considered to be the main source of income of the state and most of the original forests were clear felled. The emphasis has shifted, however, from exploitation to conservation. The state government aims to increase forest cover to 50% of the total land area. There have been various projects, including the establishment of protected areas such as National Parks, designed to preserve and expand the forests.

== Preservation and nationalisation of forests ==
Steps are being taken to intensify environmental preservation and sustainable development in the Himachal Pradesh region. All remaining forests in Himachal Pradesh have been nationalised under the supervision of the officers like Indian forest service, Himachal Forest Service and seasoned Range/Dy.Range Forest Officers. Felling of trees and sale of timber is now controlled by the State Forest Corporation, and an Enforcement Organisation has been established to prevent the illegal felling of trees and the smuggling of timber. Hunting has also been restricted.

The government has created 33 Sanctuaries, and five National Parks. Additional national parks sites are proposed.

== Reforestation programs ==
A World Bank assisted Social Forestry Project has been launched. The aim of the project is to plant more trees for fuel, fodder, and timber to meet the basic requirements of the local people, thus avoiding depletion of the old growth forests. The deforested Kandi areas are also being reafforested in another project financially assisted by the World Bank.

== Other programs ==
An integrated water shed department project for Shivaliks is also under construction.

== Fact and figures ==
Forest Cover (1996-1997)	Area
Reserved Forests	1896 km^{2}.
Protected Forests	33123 km^{2}.
Unclassed Forest	886 km^{2}.
Other Forests	370 km^{2}.
Forests not under control of Forest Department	758 km^{2}.

== Sanctuaries and National Parks ==
Himachal Pradesh has five national parks and thirty-two wildlife sanctuaries, which are listed below:

Sanctuaries and National Parks	Area (km^{2})	Year of Notification
Great Himalayan National Park	905.4 (2010), originally 754.40	1984
Inderkilla National Park	104	2010
Khirganga National Park	710	2010
Pin Valley National Park	675	1987
Simbalbara National Park	27.88 (2010), originally 19.03	1958
Bandli Wildlife Sanctuary	41.32	1974
Chail Wildlife Sanctuary	108.54	1976
Churdhar Wildlife Sanctuary	56.15	1985
Daranghati Wildlife Sanctuary	167.00	1974
Darlaghat Wildlife Sanctuary	6.00	1974
Dhauladhar Wildlife Sanctuary	943.98	1994
Gamgul Siahbehi Wildlife Sanctuary	108.85	1974
Govind Sagar Wildlife Sanctuary	100.34	1962
Kais Wildlife Sanctuary	14.19	1954
Kalatop Khajjiar Wildlife Sanctuary	30.69	1949
Kanwar Wildlife Sanctuary	61.57	1954
Khokhan Wildlife Sanctuary	14.05	1954
Kibber Wildlife Sanctuary	2220.12	1992
Kugti Wildlife Sanctuary	378.86	1962
Lippa Asrang Wildlife Sanctuary	349 (2002), originally 30.89	1962
Maharana Pratap Sagar Wildlife Sanctuary	3207.29	1983
Majthal Wildlife Sanctuary	40.00	1974
Manali Wildlife Sanctuary	31.80	1954
Naina Devi Wildlife Sanctuary	123.00	1962
Nargu Wildlife Sanctuary	278.37	1974
Raksham-Chitkul Wildlife Sanctuary formerly Sangla Wildlife Sanctuary	304 (2001), originally 650	1989
Renuka Wildlife Sanctuary	4.02	1964
Rupi Bhaba Wildlife Sanctuary	269.00	1982
Sainj Wildlife Sanctuary (merged into Great Himalayan National Park in 2010)	90.00	1994
Sechu Tuan Nala Wildlife Sanctuary	102.95	1974
Shikari Devi Wildlife Sanctuary	72.00	1974
Shilli Wildlife Sanctuary	2.13	1974
Shimla Water Catchment Wildlife Sanctuary	10.25	1958
Talra Wildlife Sanctuary	26.00	1962
Tirthan Wildlife Sanctuary (merged into Great Himalayan National Park in 2010)	61	1994
Tundah Wildlife Sanctuary	64	1962

== Gallery ==
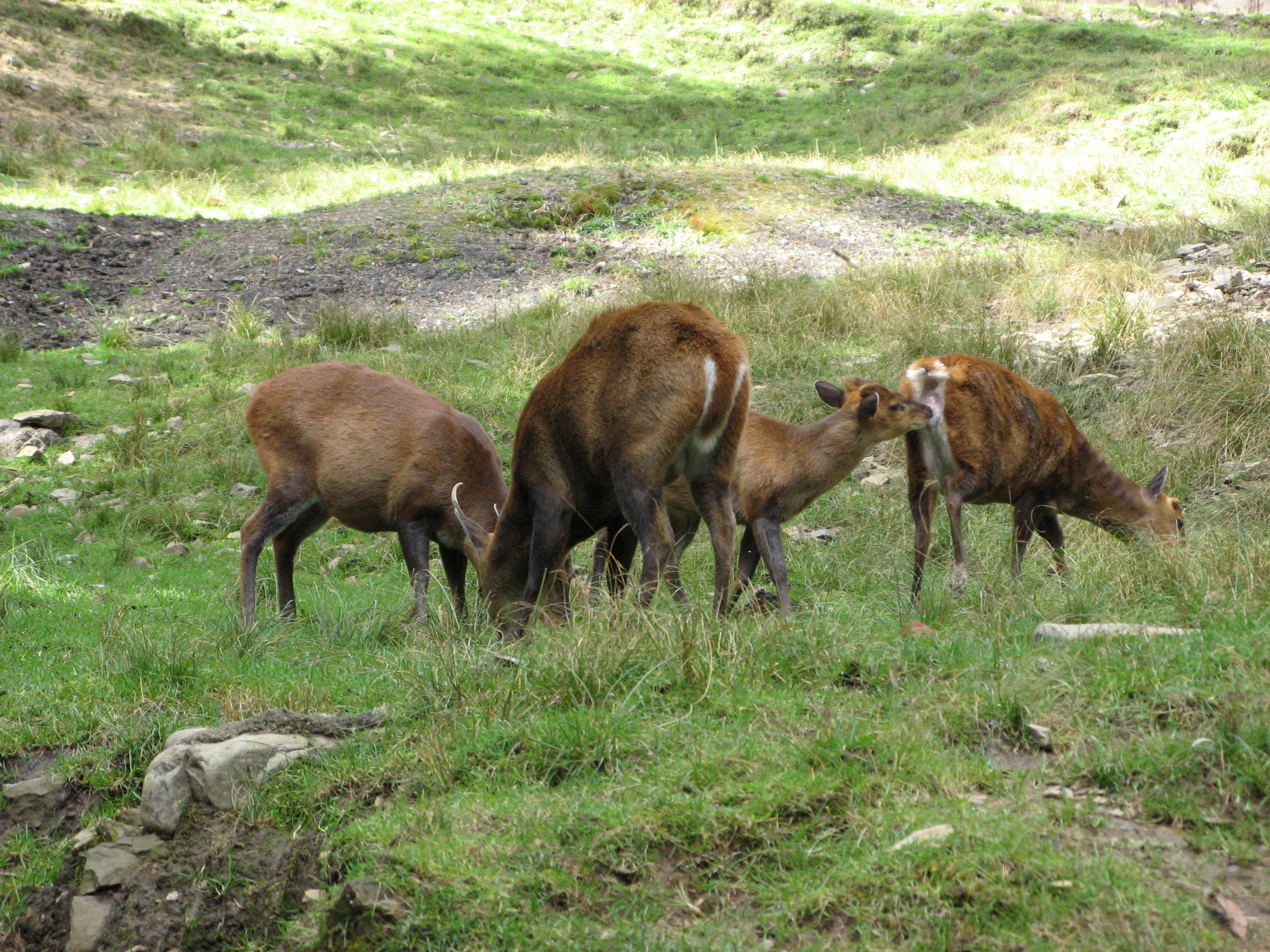
Barking deer (HP wildlife)

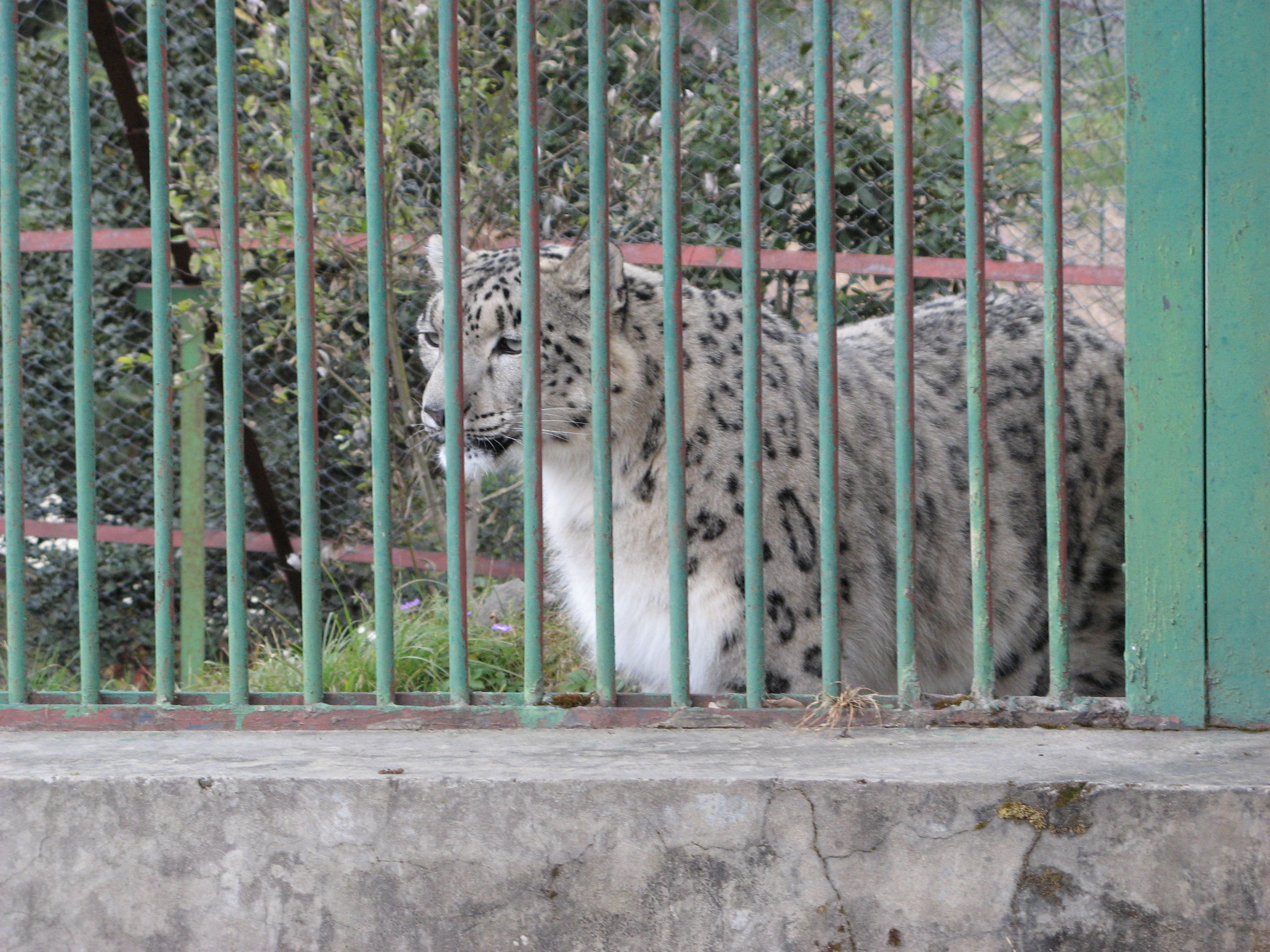
Snow Leopard (HP wildlife)

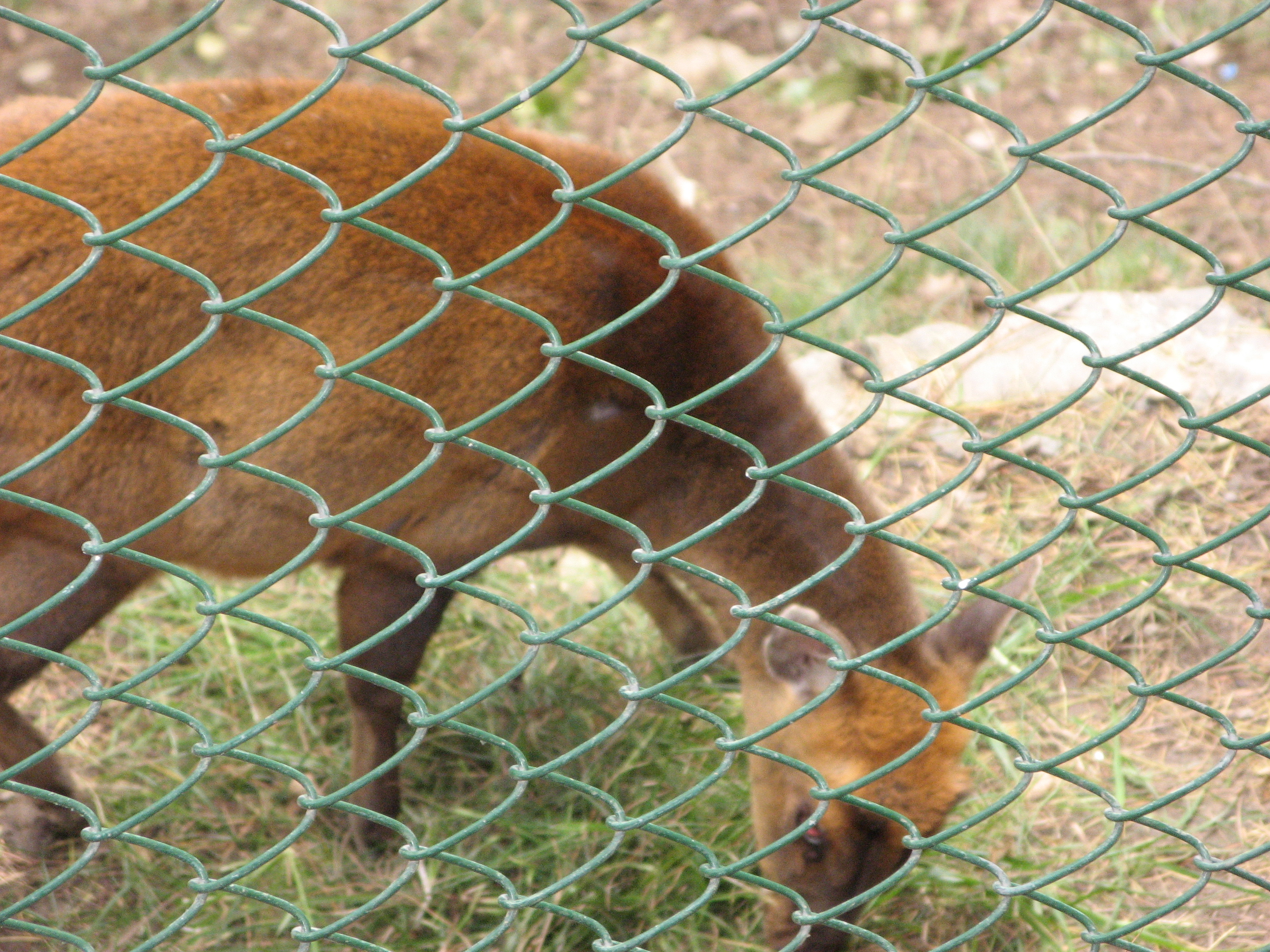
Deer (Kufri, nature park)
