= Bandli Wildlife Sanctuary =

Protected area in Himachal Pradesh, India

- IUCN category IV (habitat/species management area)
- Location within Himachal Pradesh Location within India
- Interactive map of Bandli Wildlife Sanctuary
- Location: Mandi district, Himachal Pradesh
- Nearest city: Shimla
- Coordinates: 31.450°N 76.905°E
- Area: 41.32 km^{2} (15.95 mi^{2})
- Established: 1962
- Governing body: Ministry of Environment, Forest and Climate Change

The Bandli Wildlife Sanctuary is a nature reserve in Mandi district, Himachal Pradesh, India, which covers 41.32 square kilometres (15.95 sq mi) and is located approximately seven kilometres from the town of Sundar Nagar. The sanctuary extends along the east and south sides of the Seri Khad stream. "Khad" is the Himachali term for a stream that provides essential water sources for the sanctuary's plants and wildlife.

The area is full of steep slopes, grasslands, and various nullahs. The Bandli Wildlife Sanctuary is a habitat for a diverse range of plant and animal species.

== Fauna ==
Seventy different bird species have been documented within the wildlife sanctuary. Notably, the sanctuary harbours the cheer pheasant (Catreus wallichii), a species classified as globally vulnerable and categorized as a restricted-range species of the western Himalayas. The Sanctuary also supports populations of the Kalij pheasant (Lophura leucomelanos), Indian peafowl (Pavo cristatus) and the red junglefowl (Gallus gallus). Other avian species in the sanctuary include the Himalayan swiftlet, long-tailed shrike, blue-throated barbet, red-billed blue magpie, and fire-capped tit.

In addition to its avian diversity, the sanctuary also serves as a habitat for a variety of mammals, including the snow leopard, Goral, barking deer, Hanuman langur, Indian fox, and black bear.

According to findings from a Cumulative Environmental Impact Assessment (CEIA), the Bandli Wildlife Sanctuary is one of the ten areas within the Sutlej basin and its tributaries that merit protection as a "no-hydro project zone" to safeguard fish fauna.

== Concerns ==
In 2010, the Himachal Pradesh High Court nullified the environmental clearance granted to a cement plant in Sundar Nagar, responding to local protests and concerns over the plant's proximity to Bandli Wildlife Sanctuary. However, during the Standing Committee meeting of the National Board for Wildlife (NBWL) in August 2014, a proposal was presented for the expansion of a cement plant at Bagga, Himachal Pradesh. The proposed site was 5.6 km from the boundary of the Majathal Sanctuary and 9.9 km from the Bandli Sanctuary. The Standing Committee approved the proposal requiring that 2% of the project's expenses be set aside for mitigation efforts and the protection and supervision of the wildlife within the Protected Area.

Apart from meddling with the environment in and around the Bandli Wildlife Sanctuary, the areas also faces challenges from poaching, particularly during the winter season, and leopard attacks. There have been reports of leopard attacks in neighbouring areas of Sunder Nagar and Mandi, as well as sightings in nearby courtyards and colleges.
