= Kalatop Khajjiar Sanctuary =

Animal sanctuary in Himachal Pradesh, India

Coordinates: 32.55°N 76.01°E

Kalatop Khajjiar Wildlife Sanctuary
- IUCN category IV (habitat/species management area)
- Location within Himachal Pradesh Location within India
- Interactive map of Kalatop Khajjiar Wildlife Sanctuary
- Location: Chamba district, Himachal Pradesh, India
- Area: 17.17 km^{2} (6.63 sq mi)
- Established: 1958

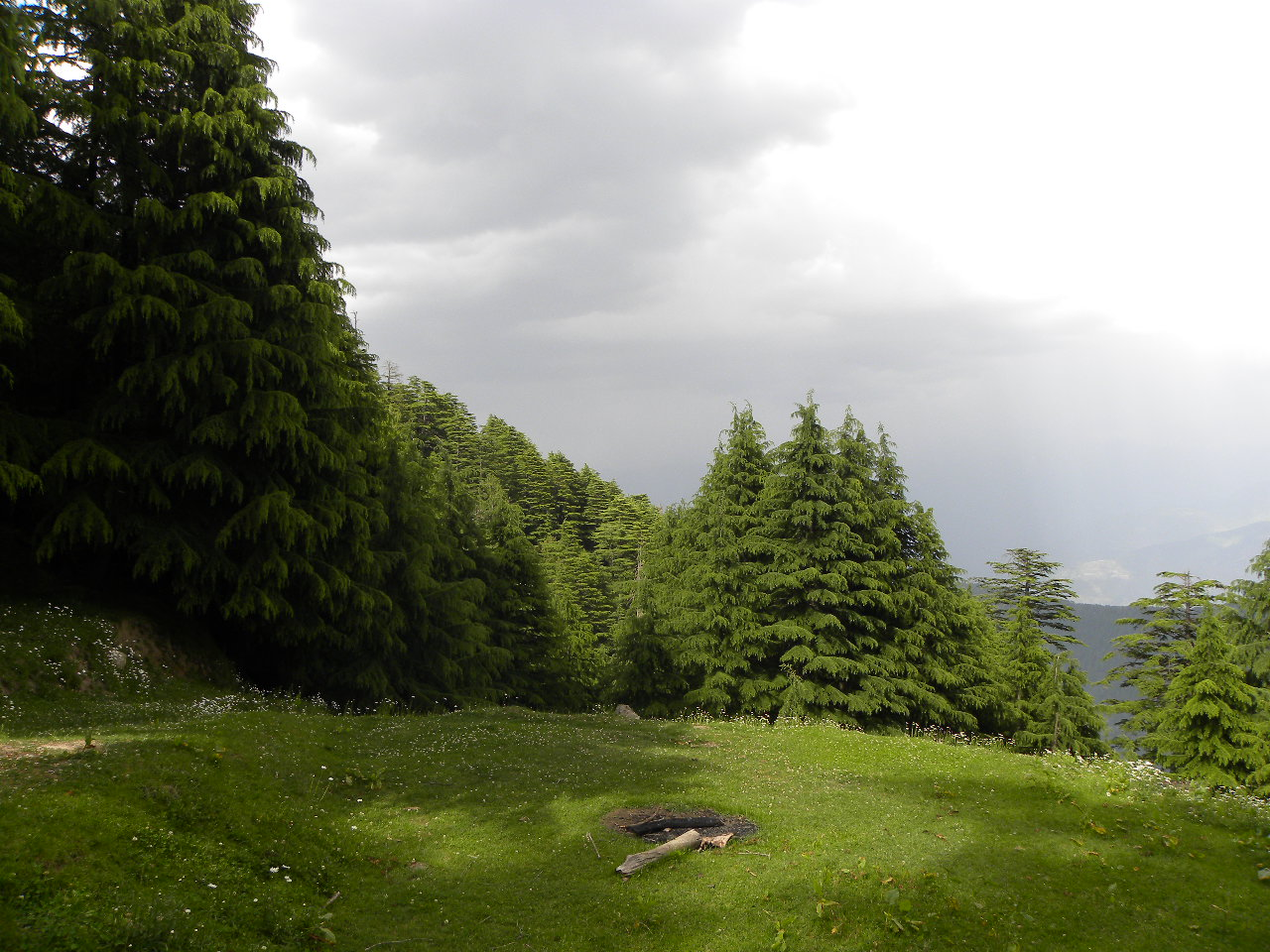
Kalatop Wildlife Sanctuary.

Kalatop Khajjiar Sanctuary, or simply Kalatop Sanctuary, is a 30.69 km^{2} animal sanctuary at Kalatop and Khajjiar in the Chamba district of Himachal Pradesh, India. The sanctuary area is well laid out for trekking trails both at Kalatop and Khajjiar. There is a dense deodar and fir forest covering 19.63 km^{2} of the sanctuary, which is about 6 km from Dalhousie. Pheasants, serow and black bear are some of the common animals found here. The sanctuary lies in the path of the Ravi River, and is surrounded by coniferous and oak forests.

- Latitudinal range- 32°02´ to 32°04´ N
- Longitudinal range- 76°01´ to 76°06´E
- Nearest rail gauge- Pathankot (86 km).
- Altitude- 1185 to 2768 m
- Temperature- 10 to 35 °C
- Mean annual rainfall- 672.3 mm.

== Flora and fauna ==
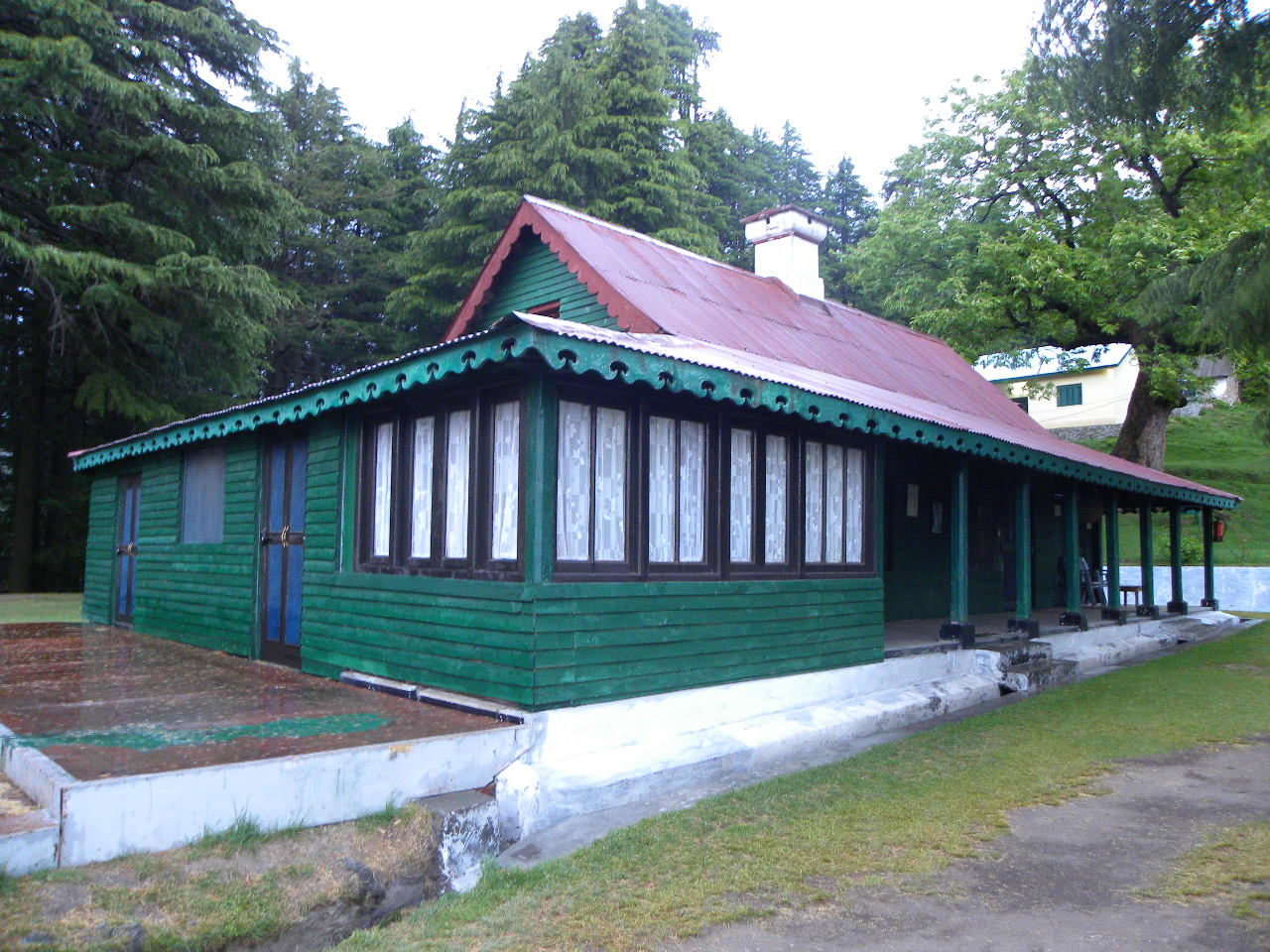
Kalatop Forest Rest House

The vegetation consists of blue pine and deodar forest, with oak. Undergrowth in the forest area is well developed. Some of the notable elements of the flora found within the sanctuary are Coniferous Trees, Oak Forests, Rhododendron, Grasslands and Meadows, Mosses and Ferns, and other shrubs and herbs.

Some of the notable fauna species found within the sanctuary are:

- Mammals - Himalayan Black Bear, Ghoral, Barking Deer, Leopard, Himalayan Gray Langur, Himalayan Black Marten, Serow, Rhesus Monkey, Flying Squirrel, Himalayan Weasel, and Himalayan Fox.
- Birds - Western Tragopan, Himalayan Monal, Kaleej Pheasant, Eurasian Jay, White-winged Blackbird, Black Headed Jay, Chestnut Billed Rock Thrush, and Grey Headed Canary-Flycatcher.
- Reptiles - Himalayan Pit Viper and Common Krait.

== See also ==
- List of protected areas of India
- Protected areas of Himachal Pradesh
- Wildlife sanctuaries of India
