= Pohlani Mata Temple =

Pohlani Mata
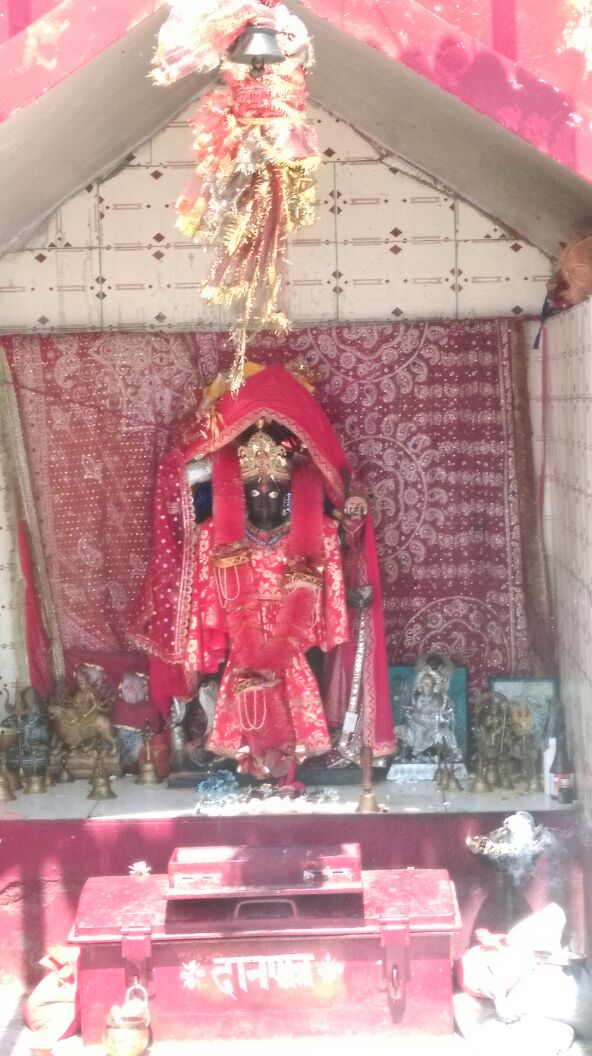
- Jai Ma Pohlani

- Location in Himachal Pradesh

Religion
- Affiliation: Hinduism
- Deity: Pohlani Mata

Location
- Location: Dalhousie, Himachal Pradesh, India
- State: Himachal Pradesh
- Country: India
- Interactive map of Pohlani Mata
- Coordinates: 32.5202082°N 76.0330345°E

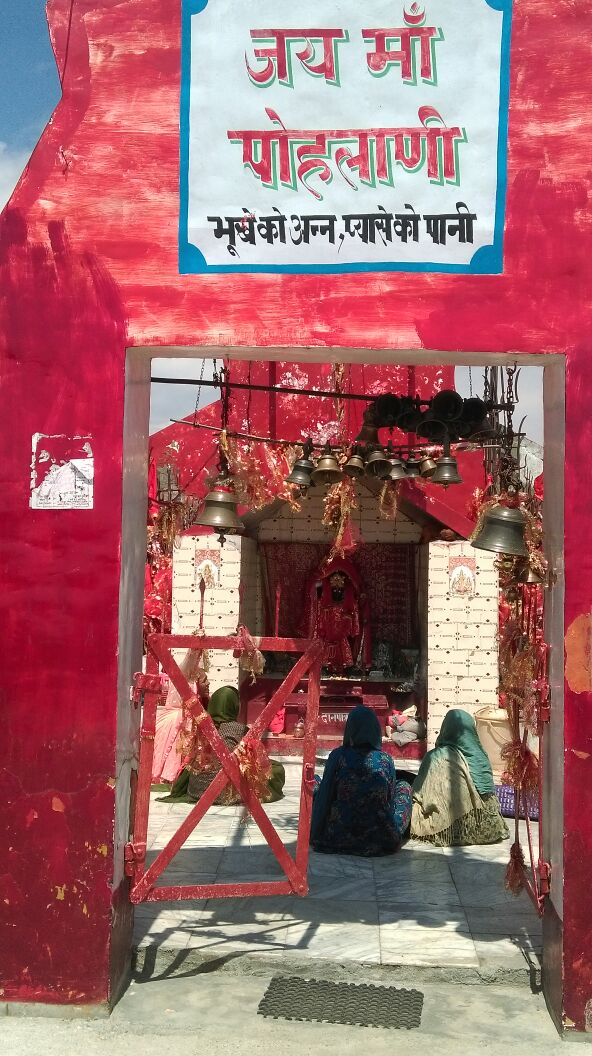
Pohlani Mata Temple in Dalhousie

Jai Pohlani Mata Temple is a Hindu temple for the deity Pohlani Mata. It is located about 8.1 km away from Dalhousie, Himachal Pradesh, India. It includes a teahouse and great views of the Pir Pinjal range.
