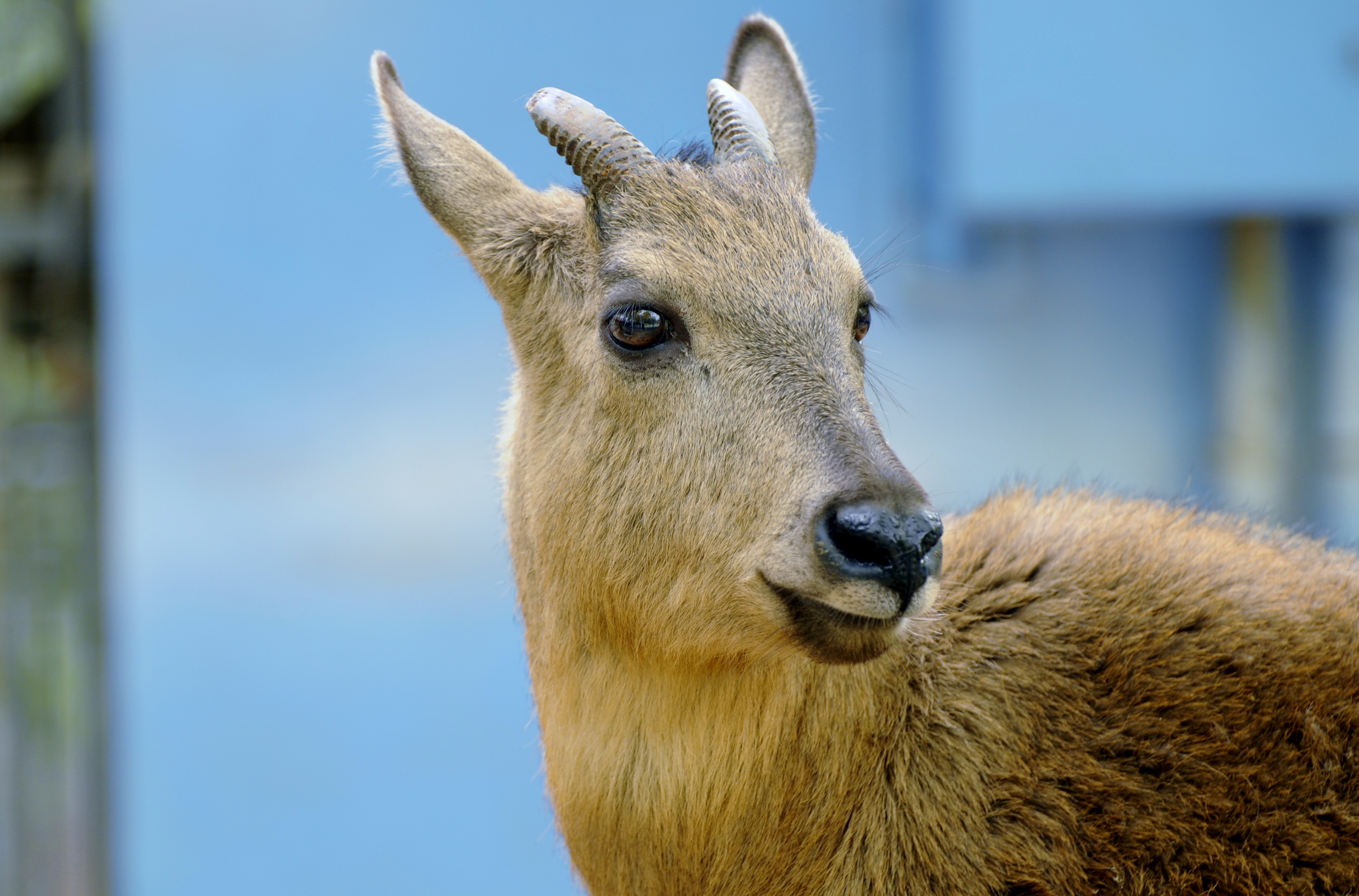

Conservation status
- Vulnerable (IUCN 3.1)
- CITES Appendix I

Scientific classification
- Kingdom: Animalia
- Phylum: Chordata
- Class: Mammalia
- Order: Artiodactyla
- Family: Bovidae
- Subfamily: Caprinae
- Genus: Naemorhedus
- Species: N. baileyi

Binomial name
- Naemorhedus baileyi Pocock, 1914
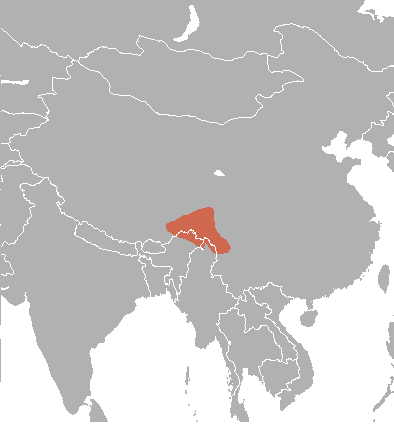
- Naemorhedus baileyi range

= Red goral =

Species of mammal

The red goral (Naemorhedus baileyi) is a species of even-toed ungulate in the subfamily Caprinae in the family Bovidae. It is found in India, China (Tibet) and Myanmar. Its natural habitats are seasonal mountainous areas 1,000 to 2,000 meters (3,300 to 6,600 ft) above sea level. It is threatened by habitat loss and hunting.

== Origin and discovery ==
The genus name Naemorhedus is derived from the Latin words nemus (genitive nemoris), meaning "forest", and haedus, meaning a young goat. Its species epithet refers to Frederick Marshman Bailey.

Reports dating back to 1912 of a remarkable foxy-red coloured goral or goat-antelope from S.E. Tibet and N.E. Assam have been investigated.

One of the earliest recorded references to their existence was made in 1863, however it was not until 1961 that the red goral was identified as its own species.

Red goral are endemic to the region where the borders of India, Myanmar, and China meet.

== Appearance and morphology ==
The red goral is a bright foxy-red animal with long, soft, shaggy hair. A thin, dark stripe runs along the back from the head to the tip of the tail. The legs are the same rich red as the body, while the undersides are a lighter buff color. The black-colored tail is very short for a goral, but a long tuft of dark hair at the end may double its apparent length.

The red goral is easily distinguished from other members of the genus Naemorhedus by its reddish coat - all other gorals are greyish-brown with grizzled hairs. The red goral is also the smallest goral, and has a greater curvature to its horns. Both males and females have a pair of short, arcing horns. The horns of males tend to be longer and thicker than those of females, but lengths of 7.5–16 cm (3.0–6.3 in) are typical for both sexes.

Body weight of the red goral typically ranges from 20 to 30 kilograms (44 to 66 lb). The red goral's body length can reach lengths of 100 cm (39 in). There is evidence showing that the females can reach body sizes larger than that of male red gorals, but size difference between the sexes is too small to be significant.

== Behavior ==
Red gorals are most active during the day, and tend to retreat to inaccessible cliffs at night, where they sleep on sheltered ledges. They are strong climbers and jumpers, and seek safety from predators by fleeing up cliffs. The predators of the red goral are jackals and leopards. They are also very vulnerable and can easily contract Ixodes which is a tick that attacks the tissue and then sucks the goral's blood. They can clear obstacles over 1.8 m (5 ft 11 in) high from a standing start. Red gorals live in mountainous regions and woodlands in The People's Republic of China and other countries near China. The goral is an animal that migrates vertically according to the season. During the summer seasons they stay in the upper area of the forest while during the winters they migrate down to the low areas in the forest. Although generally quiet, males make a call which sounds like "zer - zer" during the breeding season; female red gorals also whistle as males approach. Red gorals typically inhabit a home range of around 40 hectares. Males are territorial during the breeding season. Their diets consist of lichens, grasses, stems, and leaves. Their most common food source is Usnea which is a type of lichen.

N. baileyi is primarily diurnal, with most activity occurring in the early morning and evening. During the day, red gorals graze on sunny slopes, retreating to rocky cliffs at night, where they bed down on sheltered ledges. As with most members of the Caprinae, red gorals are very agile and move with easy speed amongst rough terrain.

Red gorals are primarily solitary, although females tend to be accompanied by their latest youngster. Only during mating season is when the usually solitary animals come together. N. baileyi is occasionally seen in small groups, typically with three animals. The composition of these groups is usually a male, a female, and her offspring, or a female with her offspring from the previous two years. This is due to the fact that females only produce one offspring at a time so they usually stay in a group with them.

== Reproduction ==
This species breeds from September to November. Typically, the female goral enters estrus at the age of 1.5 years and gives birth at 2 years of age, whereas males first show rutting behavior and mating at 3 years of age. During the rut, males will follow females closely, being in frequent nasogenital contact (often accompanied by smelling and licking) to determine the onset of estrus. Non-receptive females will either flee from the advances of males or threaten them by butting the bodies of the males with their heads. Receptive females tend to stand still as the male approaches, signalling their estrus by raising their tails. The Flehmen response (lip curl) was observed during the majority of encounters between a male and a receptive female.

== Ecology ==
Their range is centered on the region where the borders of India, Tibet and Myanmar meet.

This species is listed on Appendix I of CITES (2009). Their world population is estimated to be less than 10,000 animals, and is likely considerably less. From data collected in 1987 and 1988, the Tibetan population of this species was estimated to number between 810 and 1,370 animals. Numbers in India and Myanmar are unknown, but due to the restricted range of this species, they are unlikely to be common. Hunting is a major threat to the continued survival of this species; it is the most heavily harvested ungulate in its range. Habitat loss due to forestry practices and clearing for agriculture also poses a major threat. Red gorals inhabit several protected regions, including Hkakabo-Razi National Park in Myanmar, and Gangxiang, Muotuo, Xiaca, and Medoq in Tibet. A small captive-breeding group is kept in the Shanghai Zoo.

== Habitat loss ==
The red gorals are found in mountainous regions in Nepal, China, Tibet, and Burma about 1,000 to 2,000 meters (3,300 to 6,600 ft) above sea level. Vegetation and habitats are currently being destroyed due to climate change, and excessive hunting. Traditionally the climate has been very seasonal with wet periods interspersed with dry periods, but a historically unusual dry spell has interfered with the red gorals' ideal climate, making it harder for red gorals to reproduce. Fragmentation and forest loss have also contributed to a decrease in the red goral population.

== Human interaction ==
The red goral is a commonly hunted animal and is often killed for its body parts. Red gorals are one of the seven most valuable species that are being hunted and targeted by humans. Red gorals are hunted for their meat, skin, antler, legs, and gall bladder. The meat of the red goral is mostly eaten by the local human population, while the skin of the red goral is then sold to outside traders. Red goral meat is valued by the hunters because they prefer to eat it when they go on their long hunting trips. Red goral hunters are either locals who sell the body parts in China or traders who come from China to get the body parts themselves. The hunting of the red goral contributes to its population decline because gorals only produce one offspring at a time.

Body Parts	Unit	Average Price (USD per unit)
horn	pair	11.80
gall bladder	each	2.00
legs	pair	1.42
meat	kg	1.01
skin	sheet	1.75

== Human intervention ==
Due to a decrease in the red goral population, the Breeding Center of Shanghai Zoo started a breeding program to prevent extinction. The program started with seven wild red gorals and in the span of 22 years raised 27 red gorals. China is currently attempting to enforce laws on red goral hunting and restore their natural habitat. Programs like Chinese Geotourism aim to make revenue from wildlife while preserving their natural habitats, however emphasis on Chinese conservation is usually placed upon the endangered panda.

== IUCN status ==
The IUCN lists the red goral as vulnerable. The mature population of red gorals is estimated at 7,000–8,000 individuals, and there is still a continuing population decline due to over-hunting. Therefore, the status of red gorals remained vulnerable, as it had been since 1988.
