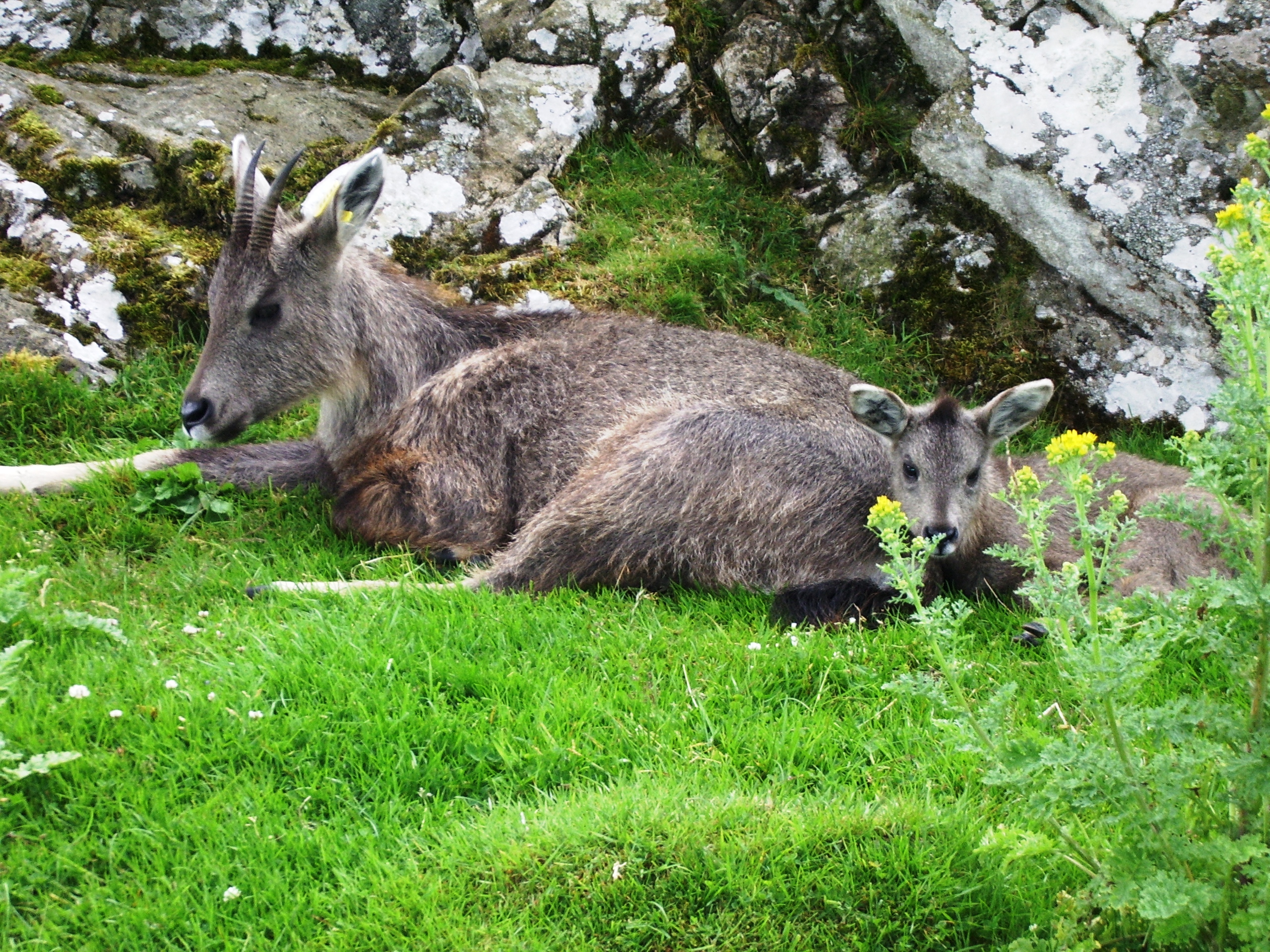
- Chinese goral with kid

Conservation status
- Vulnerable (IUCN 3.1)
- CITES Appendix I

Scientific classification
- Kingdom: Animalia
- Phylum: Chordata
- Class: Mammalia
- Order: Artiodactyla
- Family: Bovidae
- Subfamily: Caprinae
- Genus: Naemorhedus
- Species: N. griseus

Binomial name
- Naemorhedus griseus A. Milne-Edwards, 1871
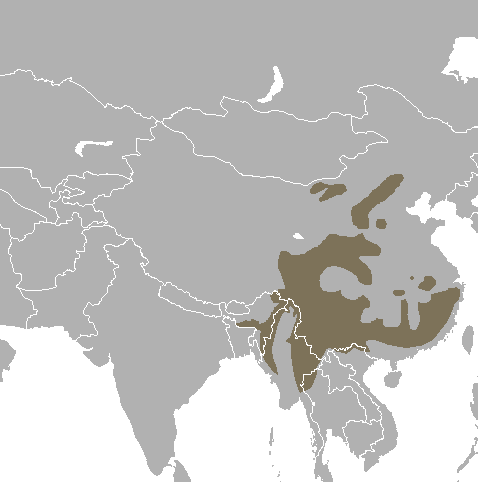
- Distribution of Chinese goral

= Chinese goral =

Species of mammal

The Chinese goral (Naemorhedus griseus), also known as the grey long-tailed goral or central Chinese goral, is a species of goral, a small goat-like ungulate, native to mountainous regions of Myanmar, China, India, Thailand, Vietnam, and possibly Laos. In some parts of its range, it is overhunted. The International Union for Conservation of Nature has listed it as a "vulnerable species".

== Description ==
The Chinese goral is intermediate between an antelope and a goat and grows to a shoulder height of 50 to 78 cm (20 to 31 in) and length of 82 to 130 cm (32 to 51 in). It is stockily built with long, stout limbs and broad hooves. The horns are short and conical and the ears fairly long and pointed. The four teats are in contrast to sheep and goats which normally have two. The coat consists of a short, dense under layer and an upper layer of longer, semierect, coarse guard hairs. The colour is somewhat variable, ranging from pale grey to dark brown or reddish brown. A dark stripe runs along the back and the throat and underparts are pale.

== Distribution and habitat ==
The Chinese goral is native to parts of southeastern Asia. Its range extends from northeastern India, Myanmar and northwestern Thailand, through northern Vietnam and possibly northern Laos, to most of China apart from the extreme north and west. It is a mountain species and is found in rugged, inaccessible areas, on steep slopes and plateaus, normally staying in rocky areas, but sometimes venturing into nearby evergreen-deciduous forest and mixed woodland.

== Behaviour ==
Chinese gorals live in small groups of up to 12 individuals, though older males are usually solitary. They are wary and retiring, spending their time on high rocky slopes where they can evade such predators as the wolf and leopard. They move to lower ground in winter. They browse predominantly on twigs and leaves of bushes, but also consume grass, nuts, and acorns. Breeding takes place in late spring when one or two kids are born after a gestation period of about 215 days. The young can walk soon after birth and are weaned in the autumn, remaining with the mother throughout the winter.

== Status ==
The chief threat faced by the Chinese goral is hunting. Animals are killed for their meat and fur and also for medicine. Part of their range is in protected areas where they should be safe, but elsewhere populations are declining. This is thought to be due to overhunting, and the International Union for Conservation of Nature has assessed the Chinese goral as being a "vulnerable species".
