= Daranghati Sanctuary =

- IUCN category IV (habitat/species management area)
- Location within Himachal Pradesh Location within India
- Interactive map of Daranghati Sanctuary
- Location: Shimla District, Himachal Pradesh, India
- Coordinates: 31.3917°N 77.803°E
- Area: 167 km^{2} (64 sq mi)
- Established: 1962

The Daranghati Sanctuary is located in Rampur Bushahr, Shimla, Himachal Pradesh, India. It has undisturbed forest areas. Monal, Tragopan, Koklas and Kalij are the pheasants found here. Some of the common animals found here are Musk deer, Goral and Thar. Forest staff posted at Dofda and Sarahan is there for advice and guidance.

== Visiting ==
As per the Wildlife Laws in India, permission of Chief Wildlife Warden (CWW) of the State or the concerned Divisional Forest Officer (DFO) under whom the sanctuary falls administratively, is required to enter/stay inside the sanctuary. Daranghati Sanctuary is administered by Divisional Forest Officer (DFO) Wildlife who sits at Sarahan.

Following are the prominent places falling along the route while one is travelling from Chandigarh towards the Sanctuary on National Highway 05. Chandigarh- Shimla (115km); Shimla – Narkanda (65 km); Narkanda – Rampur (60km); Rampur – Mashnoo (30km, State Highway); Mashnoo – Daran Village (10km, link-road).

The sanctuary receives snow in winters. The best time to visit the sanctuary is from April to June.
