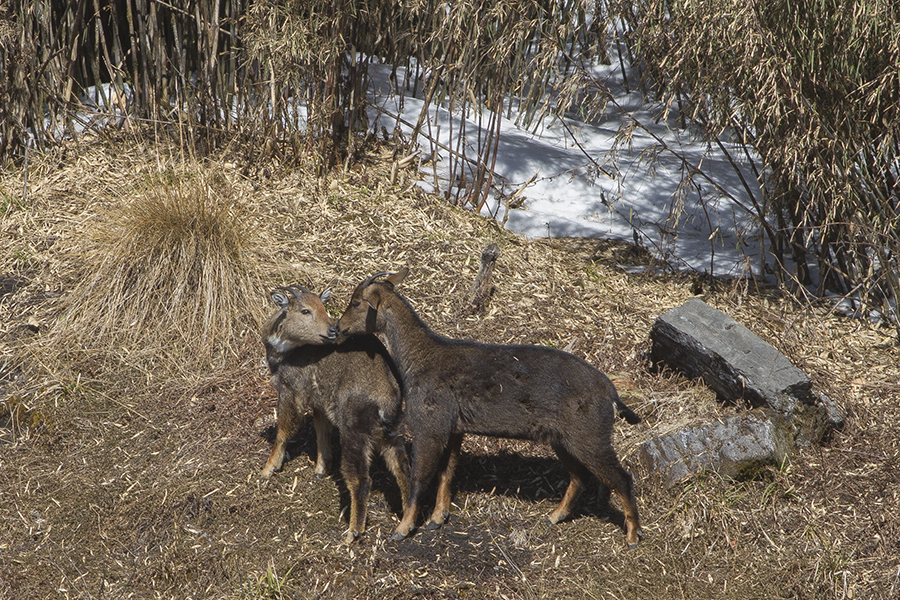
- Male and female Himalayan gorals in Pangolakha Wildlife Sanctuary, India

Conservation status
- Near Threatened (IUCN 3.1)
- CITES Appendix I

Scientific classification
- Kingdom: Animalia
- Phylum: Chordata
- Class: Mammalia
- Order: Artiodactyla
- Family: Bovidae
- Subfamily: Caprinae
- Genus: Naemorhedus
- Species: N. goral

Binomial name
- Naemorhedus goral (Hardwicke, 1825)
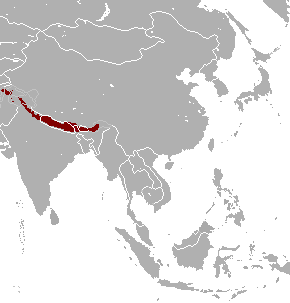
- Range map

= Himalayan goral =

Species of mammal

The Himalayan goral (Naemorhedus goral) or gray goral is a bovid species native to the Himalayas. It is listed as Near Threatened on the IUCN Red List because the population is thought to be declining significantly due to habitat loss and hunting for meat.

== Characteristics ==
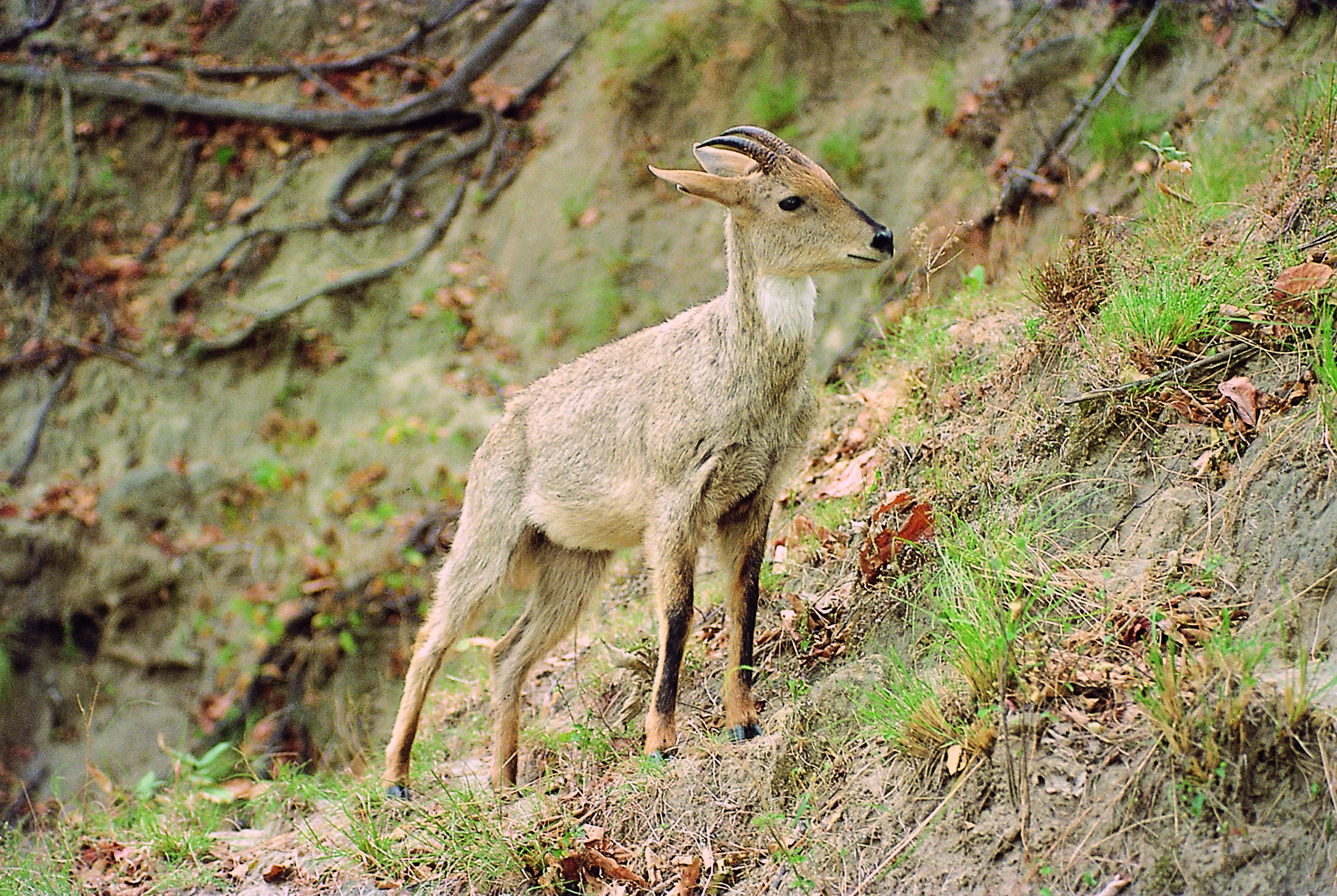
Male goral in Rajaji NP

The Himalayan goral is 95 to 130 cm (37 to 51 in) in length and weighs 35–42 kg (77–93 lb). It has a gray or gray-brown coat with tan legs, lighter patches on its throat, and a single dark stripe along its spine. Males have short manes on their necks. Both males and females have backward-curving horns which can grow up to 18 cm (7.1 in) in length. In addition to certain peculiarities in the form of the skull, gorals are chiefly distinguished from the closely related serows in that they do not possess preorbital glands below their eyes, nor corresponding depressions in their skulls.

== Distribution and habitat ==
The Himalayan goral occurs in the Himalayas from Chitral District and the Gilgit-Baltistan region in Pakistan to Nepal, Bhutan and southern Tibet, to Sikkim and Arunachal Pradesh in India, to possibly western Myanmar. It most commonly occurs from 900 to 2,750 m (2,950 to 9,020 ft). In Pakistan, it has been recorded at elevations of 1,000 to 4,000 m (3,300 to 13,100 ft). Approximately 370–1017 Himalayan goral were present in Pakistan as of 2004, occurring in seven isolated populations.

== Behaviour and ecology ==
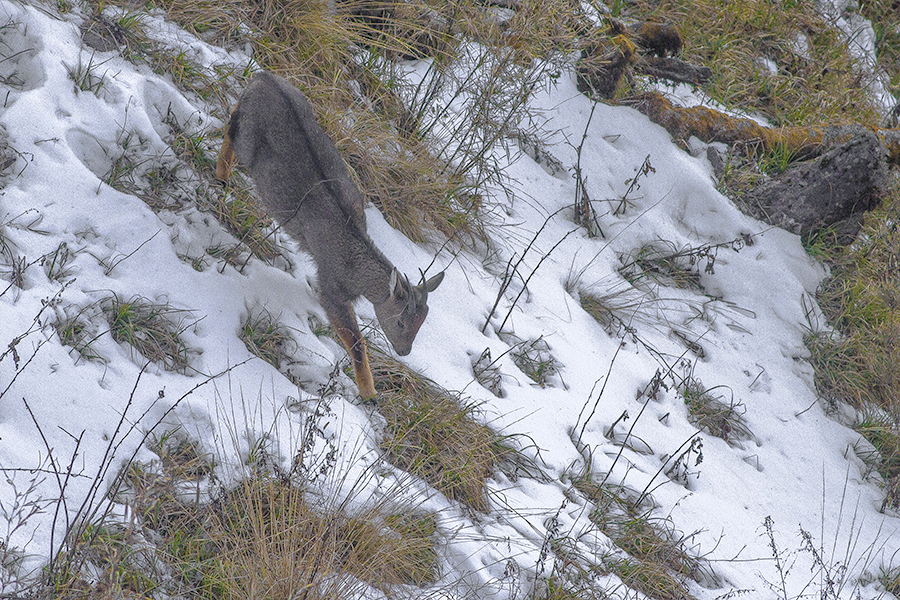
An individual walking on snow in Pangolakha Wildlife Sanctuary

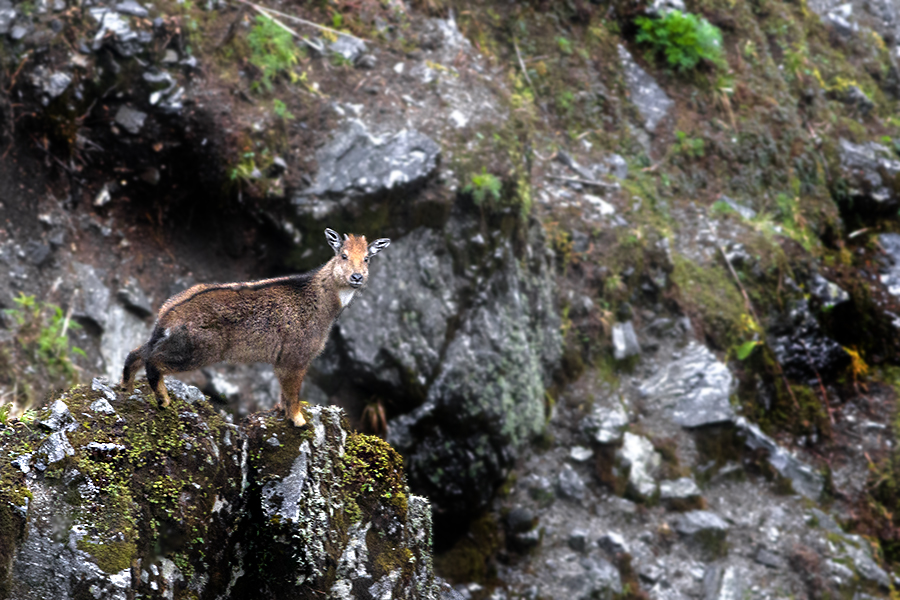
Standing at the vertical edge of a rock cliff in Pangolakha Wildlife Sanctuary

The Himalayan goral is crepuscular and rests on a rock ledge through the day; it feeds on leaves and associated softer parts of plants, mainly grasses. It often forms small groups of four to twelve individuals; older males pair off and are solitary. The home range of Himalayan goral groups is typically around 40 ha (0.40 km^{2}), with males occupying marked territories of 22–25 ha (0.22–0.25 km^{2}) during the mating season. The Himalayan goral is very agile and can run quickly. Due to its coloration it is very well camouflaged, so that it is extremely difficult to sight it, especially since it spends much of the day lying still. However, it is hunted by various predators, notably the Himalayan wolf.

=== Palaeoecology ===
During the Pleistocene, the Himalayan goral's range stretched into mainland Southeast Asia; fossil remains from the site of Tham Kra Duk in Thailand possess high δ^{18}O values, likely reflecting grazing in open habitats.

== Conservation ==
Naemorhedus goral is listed in CITES Appendix I.
