= Khajjiar =

Khajiar
- Hill Station
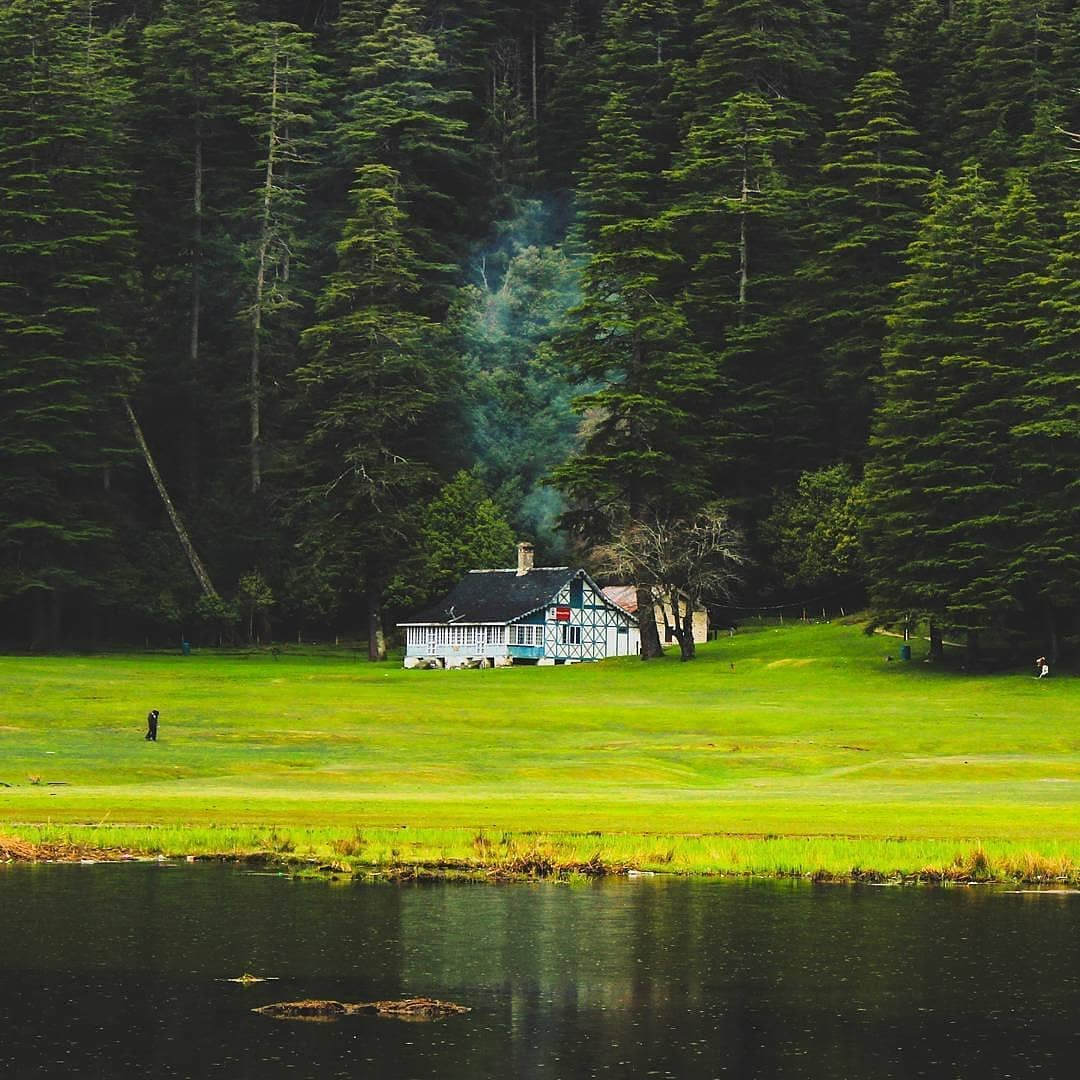
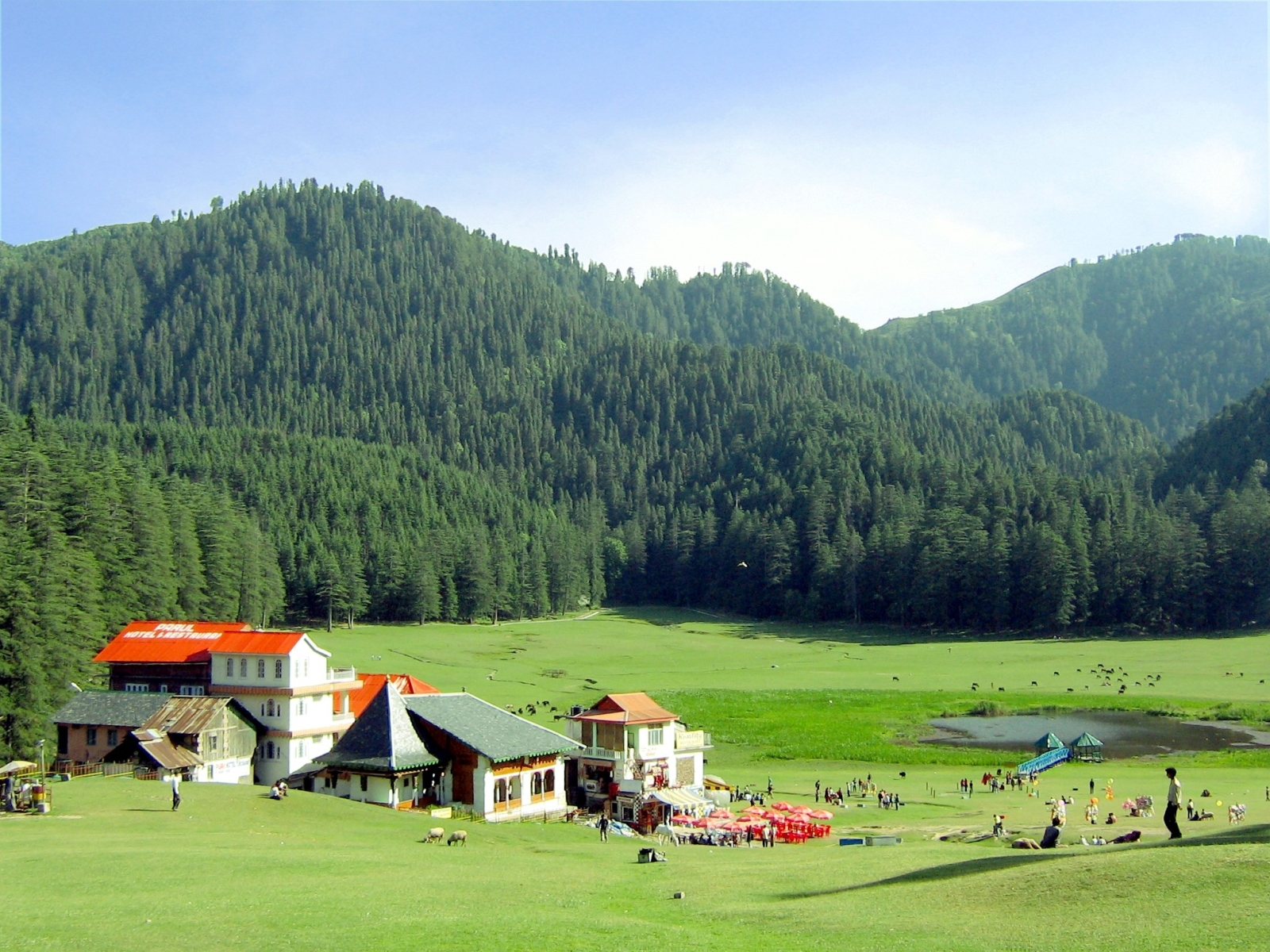
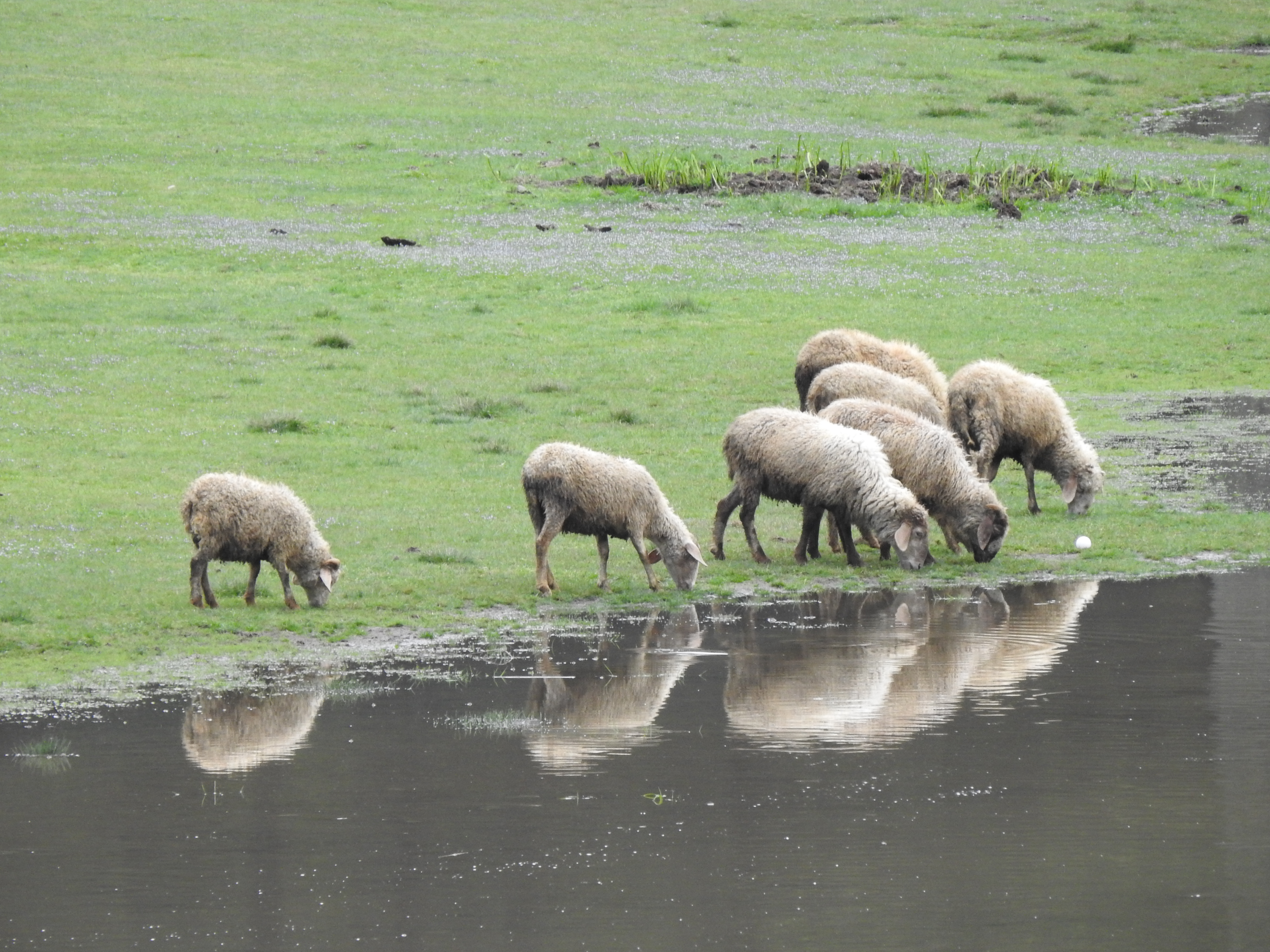
- From top: View from Khajjiar in different seasons Nature of Khajjiar in Chamba district (H.P)
- Nickname: ""Mini Switzerland of India"
- Location within Himachal Pradesh Location within India
- Coordinates: 32.5462344°N 76.0580921°E
- Country: India
- State: Himachal Pradesh
- District: Chamba
- Elevation: 1,920 m (6,300 ft)

Languages
  - Official: Hindi, Pahari
- Time zone: UTC+5:30 (IST)
- PIN: 176314
- Telephone code: 01899
- Vehicle registration: HP 48
- Nearest city: Chamba Town and Dalhousie
- Lok Sabha constituency: Kangra
- Vidhan Sabha constituency: Dalhousie

Khajjiar is a hill station near the town of Chamba in Chamba district of Himachal Pradesh, India. Located approximately 24 kilometres (15 mi) from Dalhousie, it lies on a small plateau about 2,000 meters (6,500 feet) above sea level in the foothills of the Dhauladhar ranges in the Western Himalayas. It is also part of the Kalatop Khajjiar Sanctuary.

Khajjiar can be reached from Dalhousie, the nearest major town. The area features a combination of three ecosystems: lake, pasture, and forest.

== Mini Switzerland ==
On 7 July 1992, Swiss envoy Willy P. Blazer, Vice-Counselor and Head of the Chancery of Switzerland in India brought Khajjiar onto the world tourism map by calling it 'Mini Switzerland'. He also erected a sign featuring a yellow Swiss hiking footpath symbol, showing Khajjiar's distance from the Swiss capital, Bern: "6,194 km" or 3,849 mi. Khajjiar is one of 160 locations worldwide that bear a topographical resemblance to Switzerland. The envoy also took a stone from Khajjiar, which forms part of a stone collage around the Swiss Parliament building to remind visitors that Khajjiar is the 'Mini Switzerland of India'.

== Notable sites ==
=== Kalatop Khajjiar Sanctuary ===
The Kalatop Khajjiar Sanctuary is a wildlife sanctuary home to a wide variety of flora and fauna.

=== Khajjiar Lake ===
Khajjiar Lake is a small lake surrounded by a saucer-shaped meadow and a floating island. The growth of a weed called vacha has made the earth spongy. Over time, the banks have been covered by a thick layer of earth formed by years of dust settling on the weeds.

=== Khajji Nag temple ===
A little away from the lake stands the Khajji Nag Temple, built in the 12th century CE by Prithviraj Singh I, the king of Chamba. The temple features a golden dome, also known as Golden Devi Temple. Inside mandapa, one can see the images of the Pandavas and the defeated Kauravas hanging from the roof of the circumambulatory path. The sanctum of the temple is carved from wood. This temple is dedicated to snake (Nāga) worship, and it houses several snake idols. Additionally, there are idols of Shiva and the Goddess Hadimba.

== Gallery ==
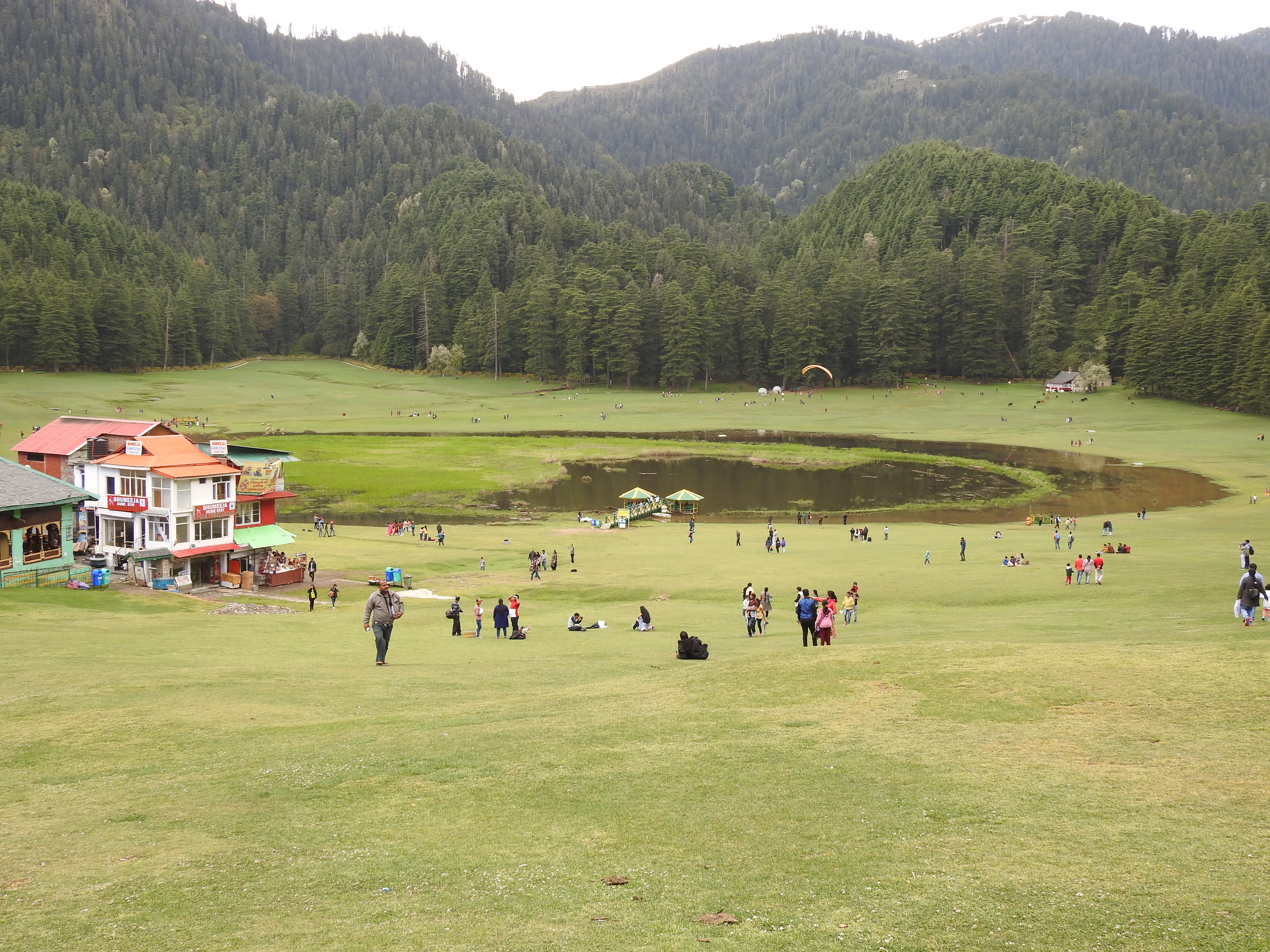
18 April 2019

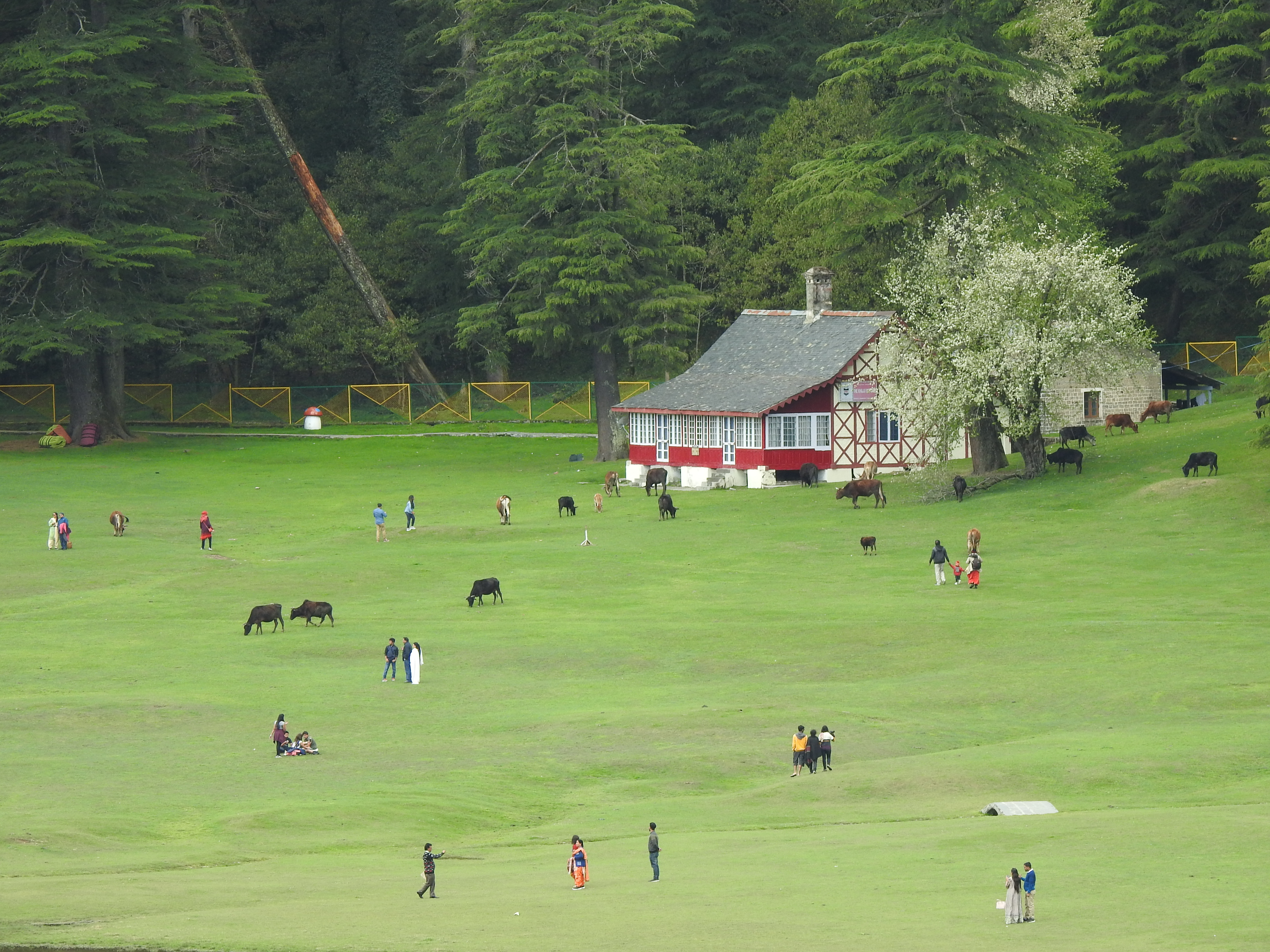
18 April 2019

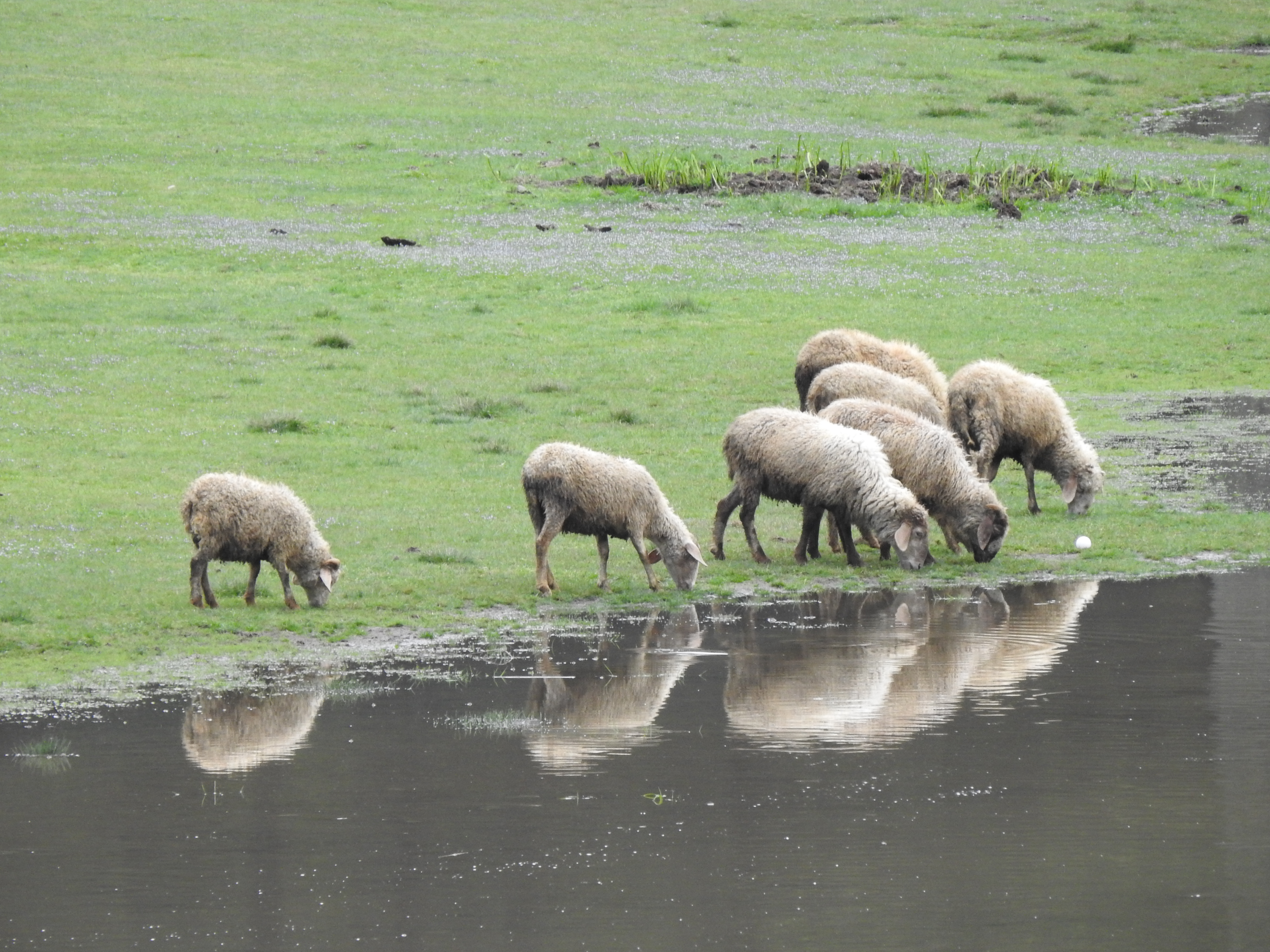
18 April 2019

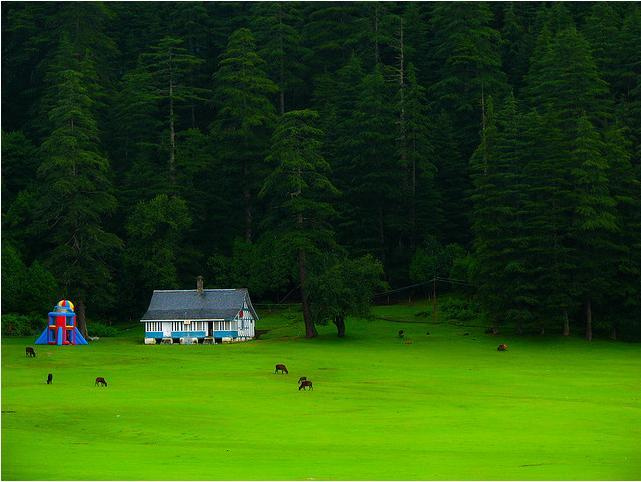
Grasslands of Khajjiar, July 2012
