= Manali Sanctuary =

Wildlife sanctuary in Himachal Pradesh, India

Coordinates: 32.247°N 77.190°E

Manali Wildlife Sanctuary
- IUCN category IV (habitat/species management area)
- Interactive map of Manali Wildlife Sanctuary
- Location: Kullu district, Himachal Pradesh, India
- Area: 29 km^{2} (11 sq mi)
- Established: 1954

The Manali Wildlife Sanctuary is a wildlife sanctuary in Himachal Pradesh in northern India. The sanctuary starts about 2 km from Manali. It is the catchment of Manalsu khad. A path from Manali log huts and Dhungri temple passes through dense Deodar, Kail, Horse chestnut, Walnut and Maple forests. Musk deer, Monal and Brown bear, Leopard and Snow leopard are some of the common animals seen here. Herds of Ibex are seen migrating in the glacier zone in summers. The area of the sanctuary is about 31.8 square kilometres. The following area was declared as a sanctuary on 26 February 1954, under the Punjab Birds and Wild Animals Protection Act of 1933.
