= Majthal Sanctuary =

- IUCN category IV (habitat/species management area)
- Interactive map of Majthal Sanctuary
- Location: Solan district, Himachal Pradesh, India
- Area: 30.86 km^{2} (11.92 sq mi)
- Established: 198

The Majthal Sanctuary is situated in Solan District and has steep and rugged terrain. The sanctuary is about 10 km on the kacha road Kararaghat (Shimla-Bilaspur Highway) to Kashlog. The sanctuary is said to have a large population of endangered cheer pheasant, and there is also a large goral population. Recently, a globally threatened bird called the grey-crowned prinia was discovered by Virender Kumar Bhardwaj and Rakeshwar Kapoor. The Himachal Tourism agency recommends winter as a good time to visit the sanctuary.
