= Talra Wildlife Sanctuary =

Coordinates: 31.017°N 77.779°E

- IUCN category IV (habitat/species management area)
- Interactive map of Talra Wildlife Sanctuary
- Location: Himachal Pradesh, India
- Area: 40 km^{2} (15 sq mi)
- Established: 1989

Talra Wildlife Sanctuary is located in Shimla, Himachal Pradesh, India. It became a wildlife sanctuary in 1962. This wildlife sanctuary covers an area of 40 km^{2}. It is an eco-sensitive zone, notified by the Ministry of Environment, Forest and Climate Change (MOEFCC). It is home to Snow Leopard which is very rare in the region.

== Location ==
Talra Wildlife Sanctuary has an ESZ ranging from 0.954 km to 4.00 km, and ‌22.56 km^{2}. Located about a distance of 92 km away from Shimla district, the wildlife sanctuary has an elevation of 1,500 m to 3,324 m.

== Wildlife ==
Talra Wildlife Sanctuary is home to forest trees that are native to both the Upper and Lower Western Himalayas. The densely forested areas are covered by trees such as Oak and Fir. Other varieties of flora include Deodar, Bhoj Patra, Rai, and Rakhal. Fauna such as leopards, Himalayan Black Bear, serow, Porcupine, Barking Deer, Himalayan Palm Civet, Eurasian SparrowHawk, Flying Squirrel, etc., are found here.
