= Dalhousie, India =

Hill station in Himachal Pradesh, India

Dalhousie ḍalhauzī
- Hill Station
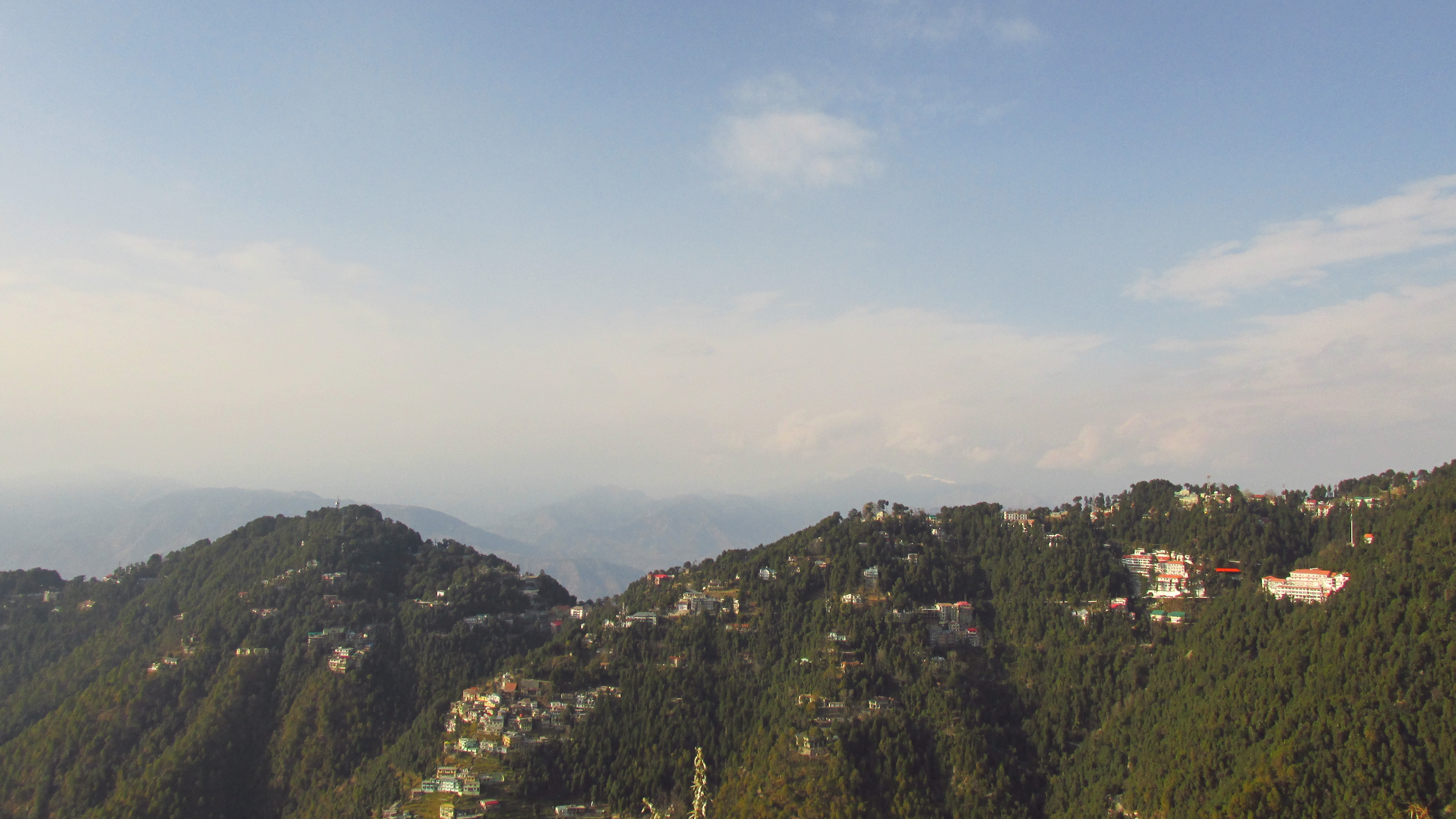
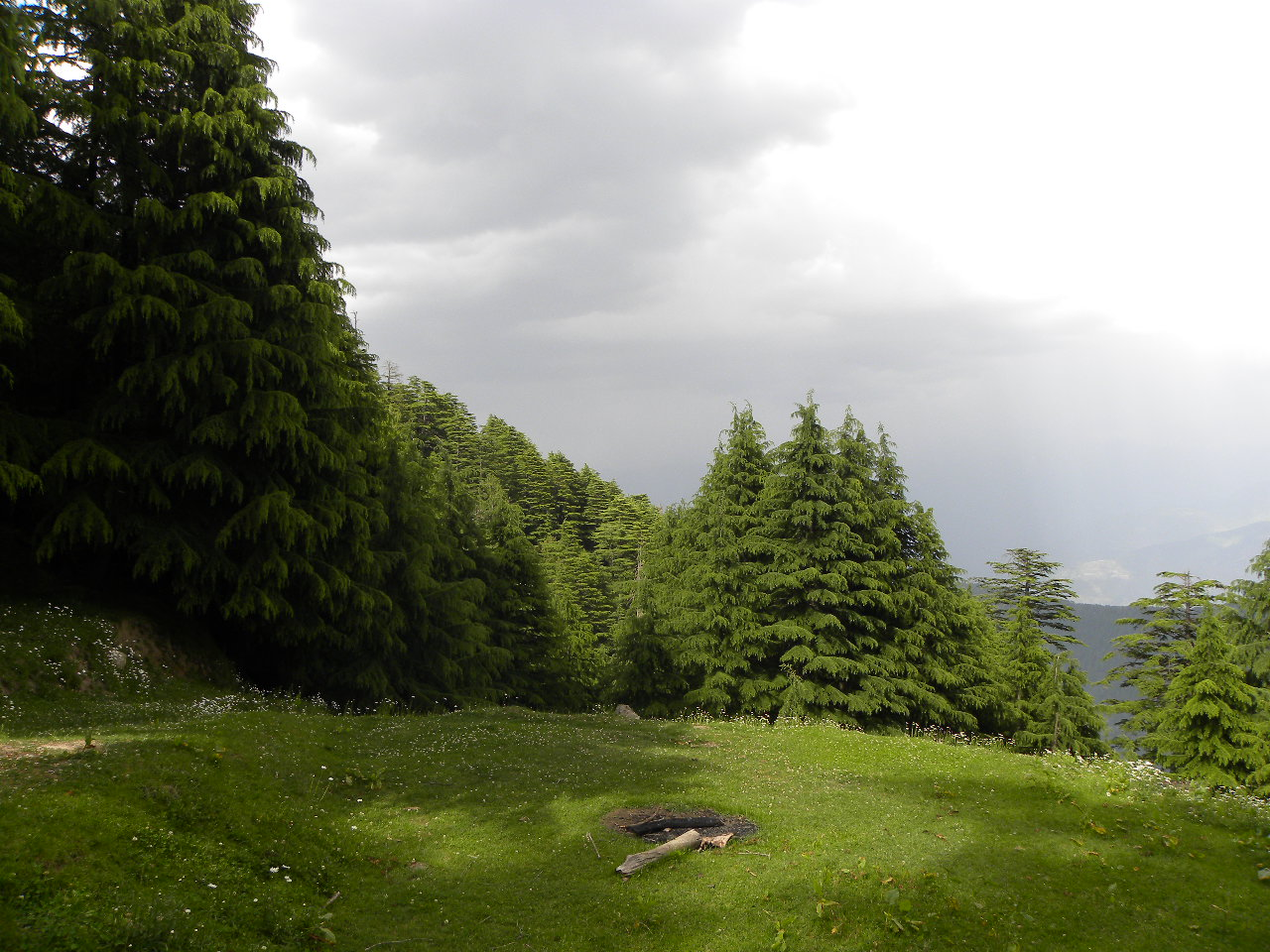
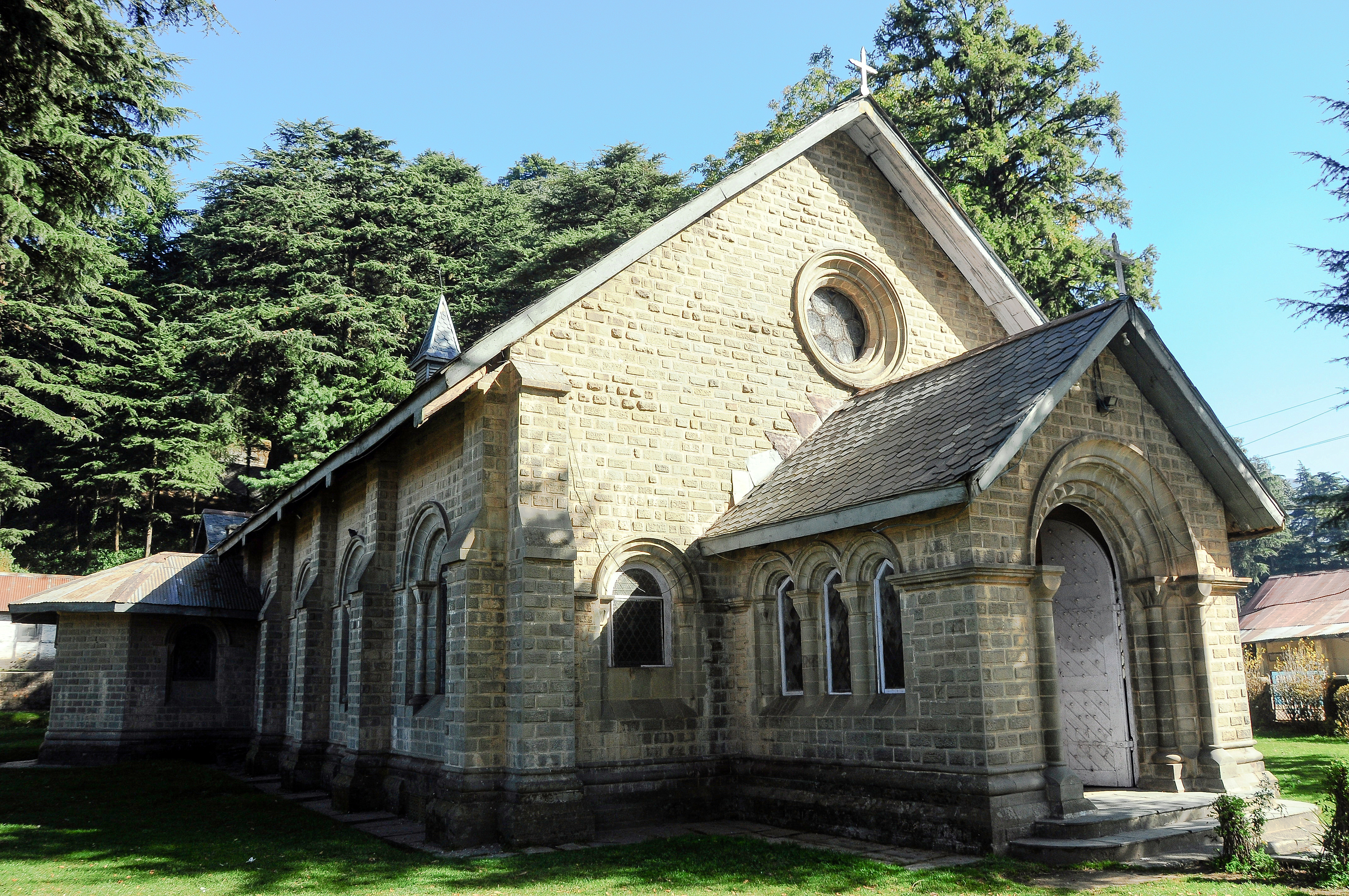
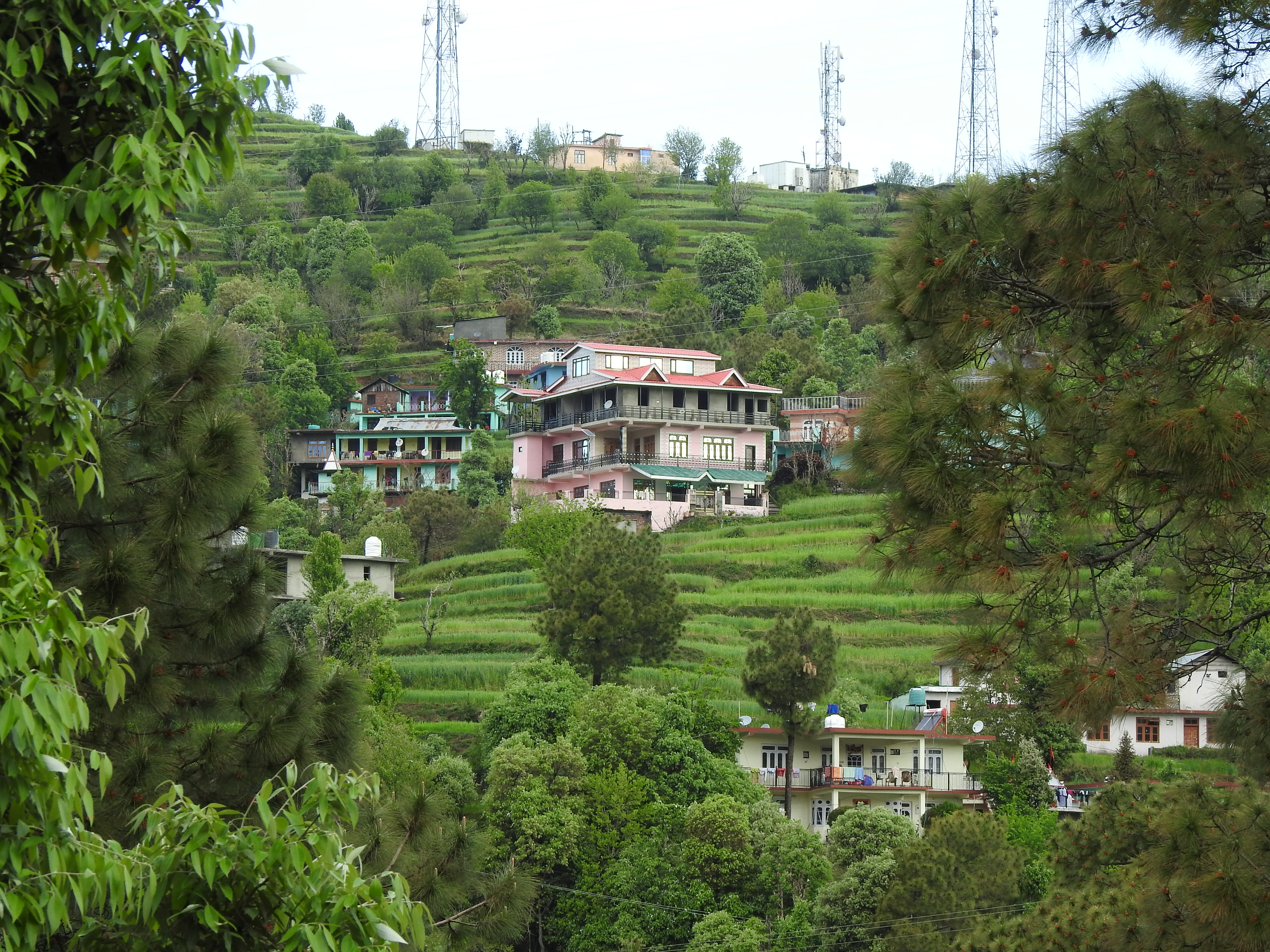
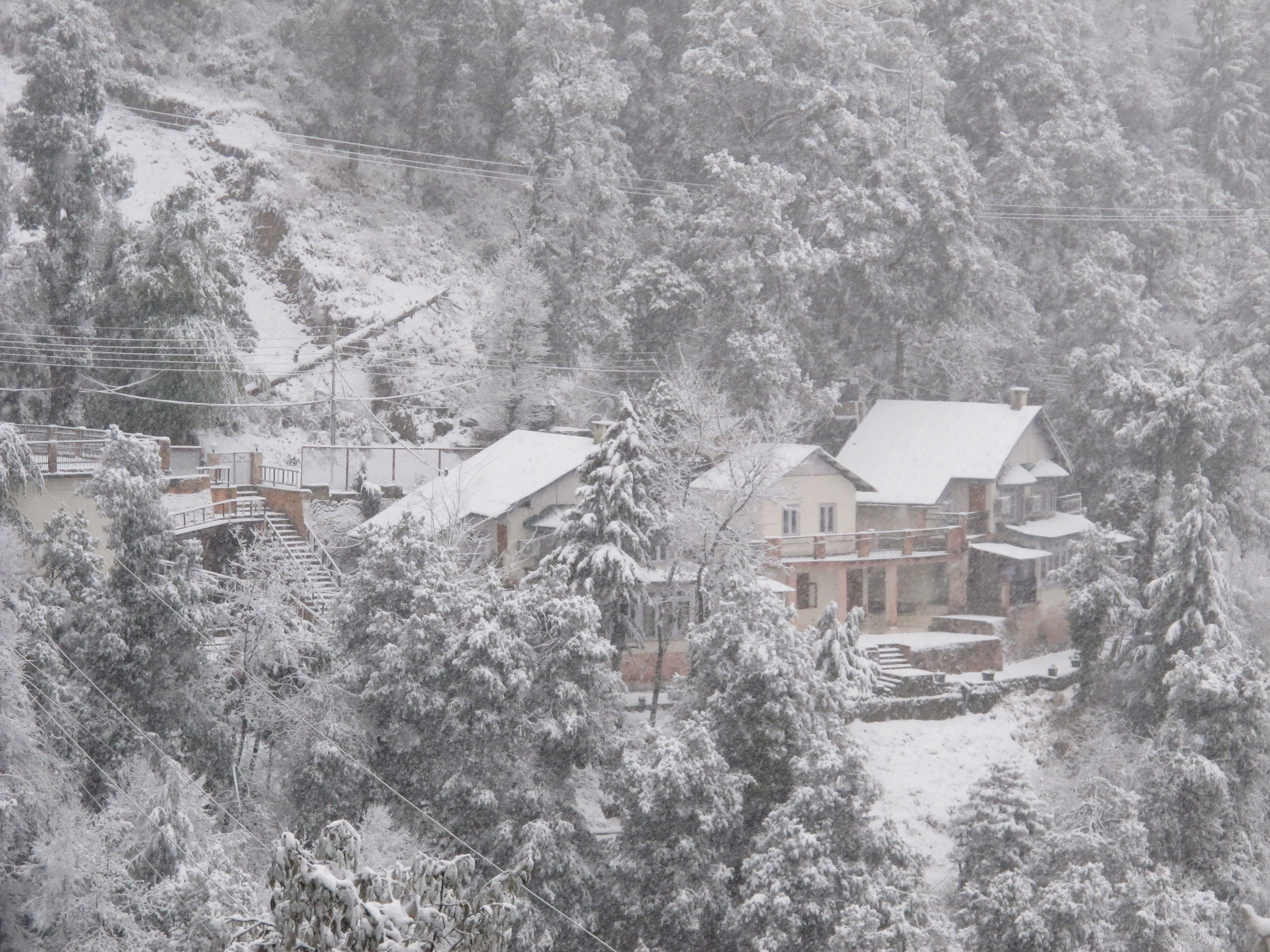
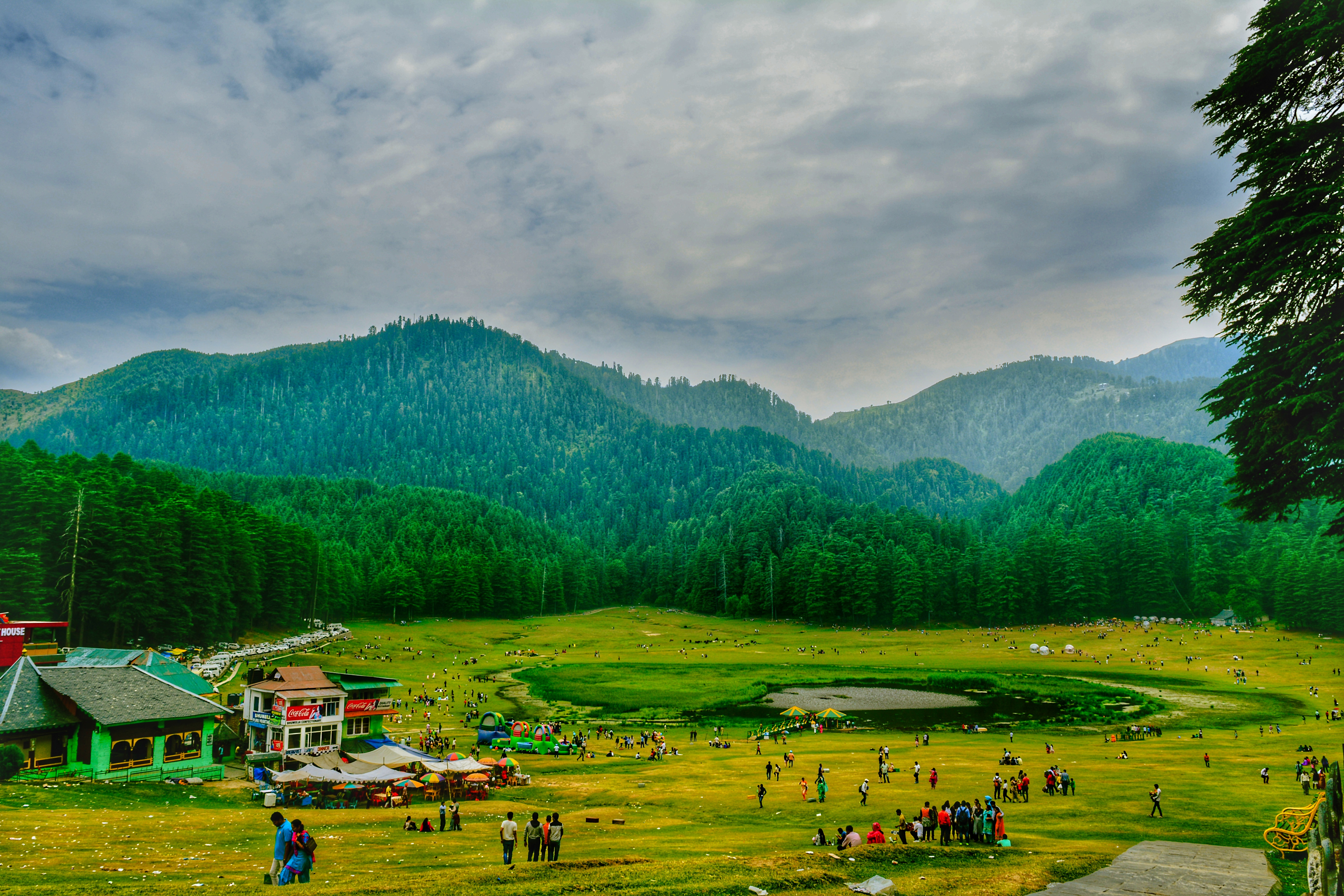
- From top, left to right: Uphill view of Dalhousie, Kalatop Khajjiar Sanctuary, St. John's Church, Beautiful landscape of Dalhousie, Dalhousie covered in snow, Khajjiar

- Location within Himachal Pradesh Location within India
- Coordinates: 32.53°N 75.98°E
- Country: India
- State: Himachal Pradesh
- District: Chamba
- Named for: Earl of Dalhousie
- Elevation: 1,970 m (6,460 ft)

Population (2011)
  - Total: 7,051
  - Rank: 25 in HP

Languages
  - Official: Hindi
  - Native: Chambeali
- Time zone: UTC+5:30 (IST)
- PIN: 176304
- Telephone code: +91 1899
- Vehicle registration: HP-47

Dalhousie (Hindi pronunciation: [ɖəlɦɔːziː]) is a hill station, near the town of Chamba in Chamba district in the Indian state of Himachal Pradesh. It is situated across five hills and has an elevation of 1,970 m (6,460 ft) above sea level. It is 17 kilometres (11 mi) from Khajjiar and 35 kilometres (22 mi) from Chamba town.

== Etymology ==
Dalhousie Town was named after the Earl of Dalhousie, who was the British Governor-General in India while establishing this place as a summer retreat.

== Climate ==
Dalhousie has a humid subtropical climate. Late summer and early spring see torrential rainfall due to monsoonal influence. The city sees over 90 frost days per year and 20-30 snowy days. The average night temperature during the season is around 4 °C (39 °F), while the maximum is close to 11 °C (52 °F).

Climate data for Dalhousie, India (1961–1990, rainfall 1951–2000)
Month	Jan	Feb	Mar	Apr	May	Jun	Jul	Aug	Sep	Oct	Nov	Dec	Year
Record high °C (°F)	21.7 (71.1)	29.4 (84.9)	30.7 (87.3)	32.6 (90.7)	34.4 (93.9)	35.5 (95.9)	32.8 (91.0)	28.4 (83.1)	28.0 (82.4)	27.9 (82.2)	25.7 (78.3)	23.9 (75.0)	35.5 (95.9)
Mean daily maximum °C (°F)	11.5 (52.7)	12.7 (54.9)	17.3 (63.1)	21.3 (70.3)	24.9 (76.8)	26.6 (79.9)	23.6 (74.5)	22.7 (72.9)	22.8 (73.0)	22.0 (71.6)	17.8 (64.0)	14.4 (57.9)	19.8 (67.6)
Mean daily minimum °C (°F)	2.3 (36.1)	2.7 (36.9)	6.3 (43.3)	10.5 (50.9)	13.8 (56.8)	16.2 (61.2)	15.7 (60.3)	15.5 (59.9)	13.9 (57.0)	10.9 (51.6)	6.9 (44.4)	4.4 (39.9)	9.9 (49.8)
Record low °C (°F)	−8.6 (16.5)	−8.0 (17.6)	−1.2 (29.8)	0.6 (33.1)	2.0 (35.6)	8.0 (46.4)	8.3 (46.9)	11.1 (52.0)	8.0 (46.4)	−2.2 (28.0)	0.1 (32.2)	−8.0 (17.6)	−8.6 (16.5)
Average rainfall mm (inches)	155.1 (6.11)	122.2 (4.81)	155.7 (6.13)	96.2 (3.79)	62.5 (2.46)	130.8 (5.15)	588.0 (23.15)	573.2 (22.57)	245.7 (9.67)	73.0 (2.87)	37.7 (1.48)	70.9 (2.79)	2,311 (90.98)
Average rainy days (≥ 2.5 mm)	6.5	5.9	6.5	5.3	4.2	6.4	18.3	19.8	8.8	2.7	1.8	3.4	89.6
Average relative humidity (%) (at 17:30 IST)	72	67	64	57	50	54	78	85	79	70	70	68	68
Source: India Meteorological Department

== See also ==
- Lootera, 2013 film shot in Dalhousie
- Almost Pyaar with DJ Mohabbat, 2023 film shot in Dalhousie
