= Sunder Nagar =

- Region
- Location in Mumbai, India
- Coordinates: 19.175°N 72.842°E
- Country: India
- State: Maharashtra
- District: Malad
- Metro: Mumbai
- Zone: 5
- Ward: P/North

Government
  - Body: MCGM
- Elevation: 13 m (43 ft)

Languages
  - Official: Marathi
- Time zone: UTC+5:30 (IST)
- PIN: 400 064
- Lok Sabha constituency: Mumbai North
- Vidhan Sabha constituency: 43
- Civic agency: MCGM

Sunder Nagar is a small area lying within the suburban region of Malad–Goregaon in Mumbai, India. It lies in west of the arterial Swami Vivekanand Road and is mostly a residential neighbourhood. It was built up in the 1970s during the city's population and construction boom. The name Sunder Nagar means "beautiful place" in Hindi. There was a community called "Vijaykar Wadi" before 1970 and its name was changed to "Sunder Nagar". "Wadi" means group of trees, there were many "Mango" and "Chikoo" trees in the area, still some can be seen in the park maintained by "The Sunder Nagar Welfare Association". However, recently the garden is in bad shape and the management is poor and entire main road is encroached by hawkers.

The area is also known for having a number of educational institutes. The schools contained in this area include Infant Jesus School, Umedbhai Patel English School along with international schools such as DG Khetan International School and Mainadevi Bajaj International School. Colleges contained in this area include Dalmia College and Saraf College. The area also encompasses a few parks to the south such as Jogger's Park and BMC Park. The most visited area in this place is the Sunder Nagar Garden which is now meeting point of love birds from nearby areas.

The residents are mostly Gujaratis - Hindus as well as Muslims. A small Sikh community is centred on a small Gurudwara and there is even a Jain temple. It has a Shankar temple and is at walkable distance from Chincholi Balaji temple. There is a huge upper middle class and upper class Gujarati, Marwari community in and around Sunder Nagar, consisting mainly of businessmen and businesswomen. About 80% of the population of Sunder Nagar are Hindus, the rest mainly Muslim. There are several bakeries and Dairy shops. There are almost all banks within a km radius of Sunder Nagar including private, nationalised and cooperative Banks. Sunder Nagar has buildings named by English alphabet and are merely in alphabetical order. The most populated building is P Unit while the least populated is M unit. New projects have come in this area to cater to the upmarket lifestyle of Sundar Nagar's residents, which include Triumph Swastik (with two podiums and highest floor to floor height), Serene Towers, Saptaratna Towers. Main road in this area is Sunder Nagar Road which is directly perpendicular to SV Road through the Vadapav seller port Jumboking.

Sunder Nagar is an area near to Chincholi Bunder, Veena Nagar, Udyog Nagar, Pawan Baug and Mahesh Nagar. A 10 min by drive from both its near railway stations- Malad and Goregaon and also Link Road and Highway. Sunder Nagar has multiple Medical, Departmental and food stalls. Sunder Nagar is well-connected with Inorbit Mall, Oberoi Mall, and Infinity Mall within a 15 minute commute.

Sunder Nagar has flat size ranging between 400 so. Ft to around 1600 sq. Ft. and has almost all facilities within 2 kilometers radius ans can be called a complete township.

== Climate ==
Sunder Nagar has been ranked 10th best “National Clean Air City” under (Category 3 population under 3 lakhs cities) in India.

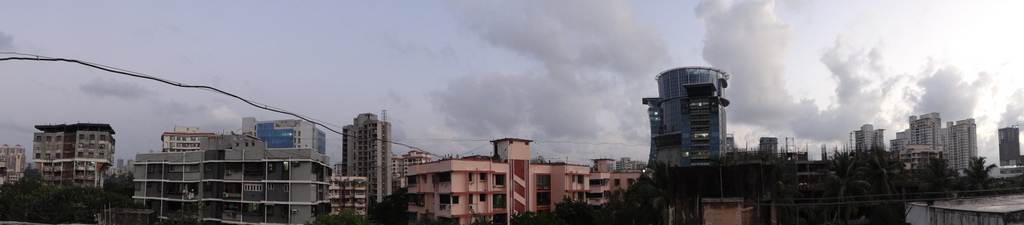
Sunder Nagar Buildings
