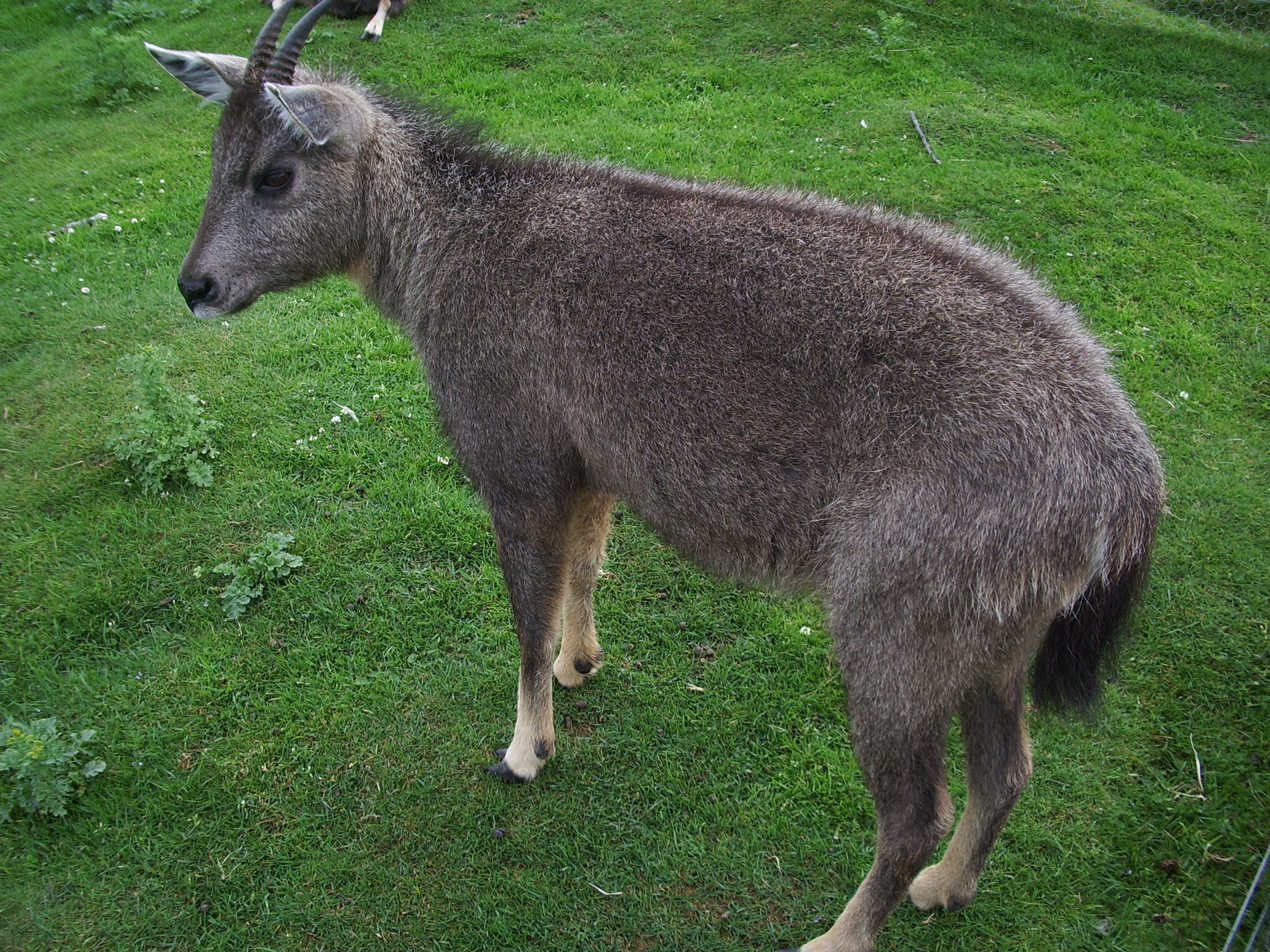
- Chinese goral, Nemorhaedus griseus

Scientific classification
- Kingdom: Animalia
- Phylum: Chordata
- Class: Mammalia
- Infraclass: Placentalia
- Order: Artiodactyla
- Family: Bovidae
- Subfamily: Caprinae
- Tribe: Ovibovini
- Genus: Naemorhedus; Hamilton Smith, 1827

Type species
- Antilope goral Hardwicke, 1825

Species
- Naemorhedus goral Naemorhedus caudatus Naemorhedus baileyi Naemorhedus griseus

= Goral =

Genus of mammals

The gorals are four species in the genus Naemorhedus. They are small ungulates with a goat-like or antelope-like appearance. Until recently, this genus also contained the serow species (now in genus Capricornis).

== Etymology ==
The original name is based on Latin nemor-haedus, from nemus, nemoris 'grove' and haedus 'little goat', but it was misspelt Naemorhedus by Hamilton Smith (1827).

The name goral comes from an eastern Indian word for the Himalayan goral.

== Extant species ==
Image	Scientific name	Common name	Distribution
	Naemorhedus goral	Himalayan goral (also known as ghural)	northern Pakistan, northwest and northeast India, as well as Nepal, Bhutan, and southern Tibet
	Naemorhedus caudatus	long-tailed goral	eastern Russia and northeast China through North Korea and South Korea. A population has also been documented in the Demilitarized Zone on the Korean Peninsula
	Naemorhedus baileyi	red goral	Yunnan province of China, to Tibet and northeast India through northern Myanmar
	Naemorhedus griseus	Chinese goral	China, northeast India, Myanmar, northwest Thailand, northern Vietnam, and possibly Laos.

== Habitat ==
Gorals are often found on rocky hillsides at high elevations. Though their territories often coincide with those of the closely related serow, the goral will usually be found on higher, steeper slopes with less vegetation.

== Characteristics ==
Gorals typically weigh 25–40 kilograms (55–88 lb), stand 51–79 centimetres (20–31 in) tall at the shoulder, and are 80–130 centimetres (31–51 in) in length, with short, backward-facing horns. Coloration differs between species and individuals, but generally ranges from light gray to dark red-brown, with lighter patches on the chest, throat, and underside, and a dark stripe down the spine. They have woolly undercoats covered by longer, coarser hair, which helps to protect them in the cold areas where they are often found.

Though the groups share many similarities, gorals are stockier than antelopes and have broader, heavier hooves. Female gorals have four functional teats, while female goats and sheep have only two functional teats. Unlike serows, gorals have no working preorbital glands.
