= NHPC =

Indian public sector hydropower company

NHPC Limited

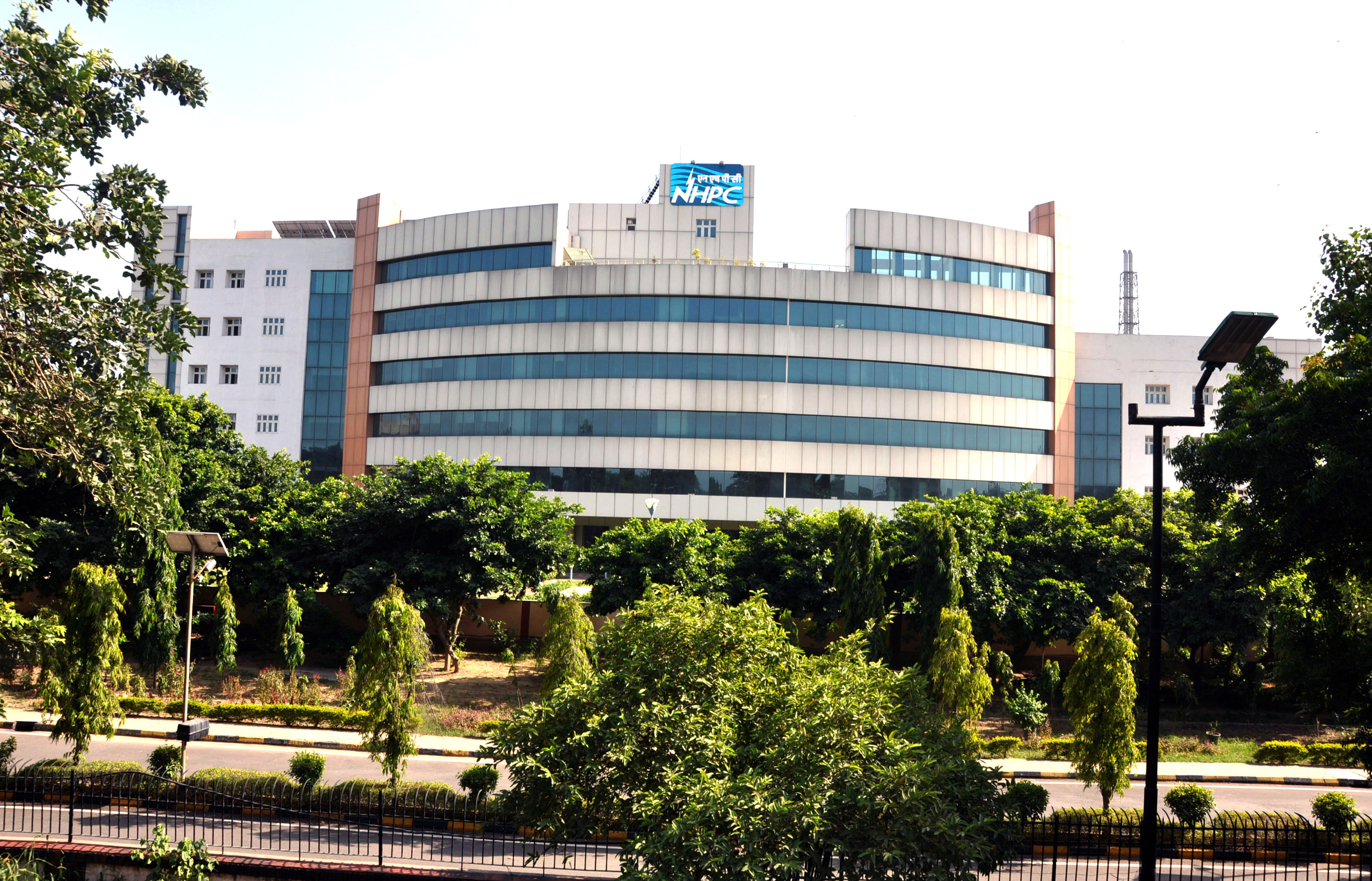
- Headquarters in Faridabad
- Type: Public
- Traded as: BSE: 533098; NSE: NHPC
- Industry: Electric utility
- Founded: 7 November 1975
- Headquarters: Faridabad, Haryana, India
- Key people: Shri Bhupender Gupta (Chairman & Managing Director)
- Products: Electricity generation energy trading
- Revenue: ▲₹10,770 crore (US$1.1 billion) (2023)
- Operating income: ▲₹5,054.56 crore (US$520 million) (2023)
- Net income: ▲₹3,411.73 crore (US$350 million) (2025)
- Total assets: ▲₹73,157 crore (US$7.6 billion) (2021)
- Total equity: ▲₹43,892 crore (US$4.6 billion) (2024)
- Owner: Government of India (70.95%)
- Number of employees: 4,693 (10 October 2026)
- Website: www.nhpcindia.com

National Hydroelectric Power Corporation Limited (NHPC) is an Indian public sector hydropower company that was incorporated in 1975 to plan, promote and organise an integrated and efficient development of hydroelectric power. Recently it has expanded to include other sources of energy like solar, geothermal, tidal, and wind.

At present, NHPC is a Navaratna enterprise of the Government of India and among the top ten companies in the country in terms of investment base. Baira Suil Power station in Salooni tehsil of Chamba district was the first project undertaken by NHPC.

== Public Limited Company ==
NHPC is listed on the National Stock Exchange and Bombay Stock Exchange on 1 September 2009. The government of India and State Governments have 67.40% share as a promoter of the company while remaining 32.6% is public shareholding. The total number of shareholders are 191,337 and share capital is ₹12,300,742,773.

== Market value ==
At present, NHPC is a schedule 'A' Enterprise of the Govt. of India with an authorised share capital of ₹150 billion, with an investment base of over ₹552 billion Approx. In 2015–16 NHPC made a profit after tax of ₹24.40 billion. An increase of 15% than the previous year profit of ₹21.24 billion. NHPC is among the top 10 companies in India in terms of investment.

Initially, on incorporation, NHPC took over the execution of Salal Stage-I, Bairasiul and Loktak Hydro-electric Projects from Central Hydroelectric Projects Control Board. Since then, it has executed 22 hydro projects with an installed capacity of 6717 MW on ownership basis including projects taken up in a joint venture. One wind project of 50 MW has also been commissioned in October 2016. NHPC has also executed 5 projects with an installed capacity of 89.35 MW on turnkey basis. Two of these projects have been commissioned in neighbouring countries i.e. Nepal and Bhutan at a capacity of 14.1 &60 MW.

== Ongoing Projects (as of Feb 2023) ==
Presently NHPC is engaged in the construction of 3 projects aggregating to a total capacity of 3130 MW. NHPC has planned to add 1702 MW during 12th Plan period of which 1372 MW has been completed. 5 projects of 4995 MW are awaiting clearances/Govt. approval for their implementation. Detailed Projects reports are being prepared for 3 projects of 1130 MW. Besides, 3 projects of 1230 MW are under development through its JV, Chenab Valley Power Projects Pvt. Ltd. in J&K.

In late 2016, NHPC commissioned a 50 MW wind Power Project in Jaisalmer, Rajasthan.

On April 16, 2025, with commission of its 4th Unit NHPC fully commissioned 800MW Parbati-II H.E. Project.

Since its inception in 1975, NHPC has grown to become one of the largest organisations in the field of hydropower development in the country. With its present capabilities, NHPC can undertake all activities from concept to commissioning of hydroelectric projects.

== Subsidiaries ==
- Chenab Valley Power Projects Ltd.
- NHDC Limited
- Bundelkhand Saur Urja Limited
- Ratle Hydroelectric Power Corporation (RHPC) Ltd.
- Loktak Downstream Hydroelectric Corporation Limited
- Jal Power Corporation
- NHPC Renewable Energy Limited (NREL)

== Power stations ==
Total – 8032.9MW (As of April 2025)

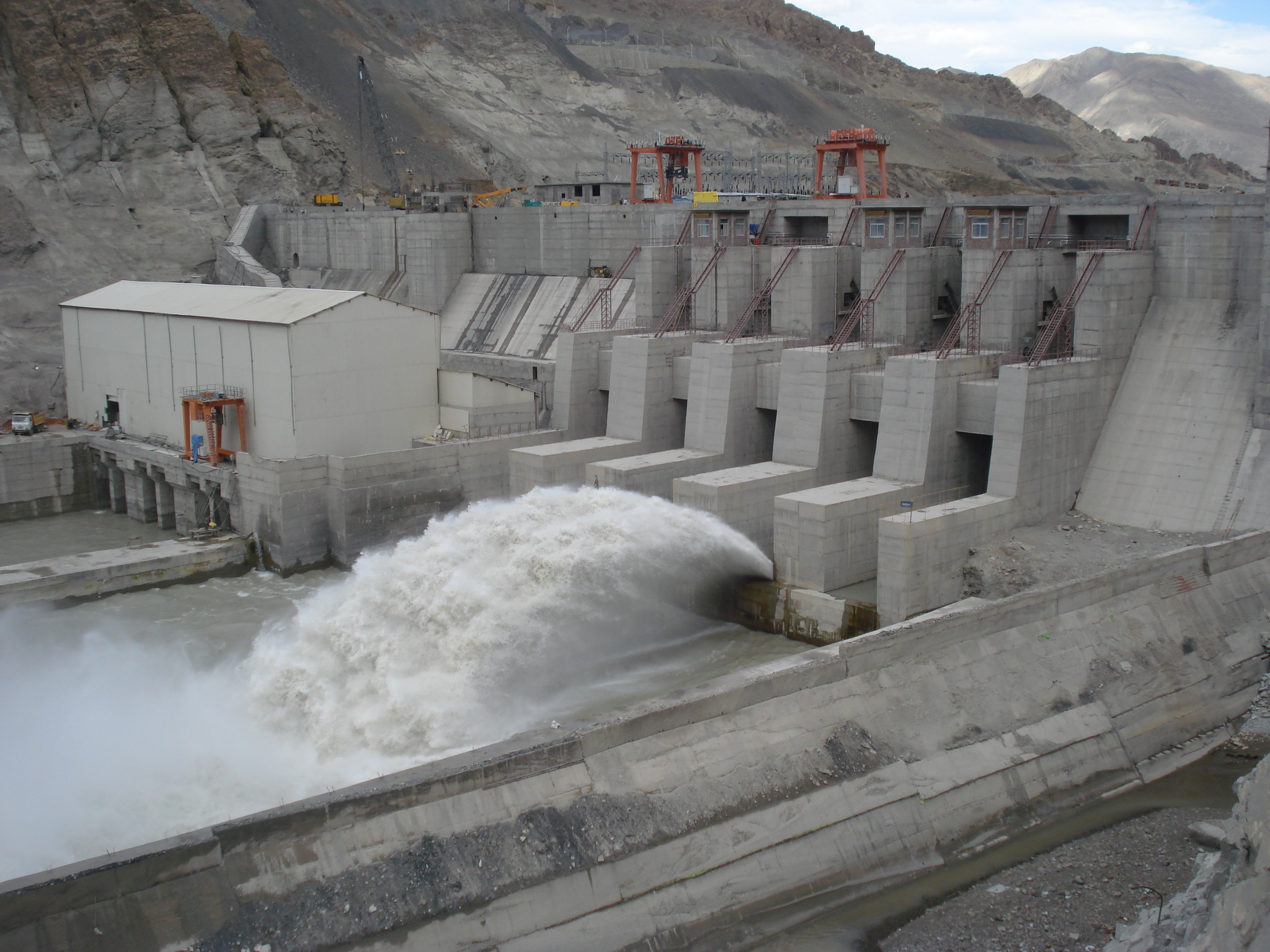
Nimoo Bazgo Dam

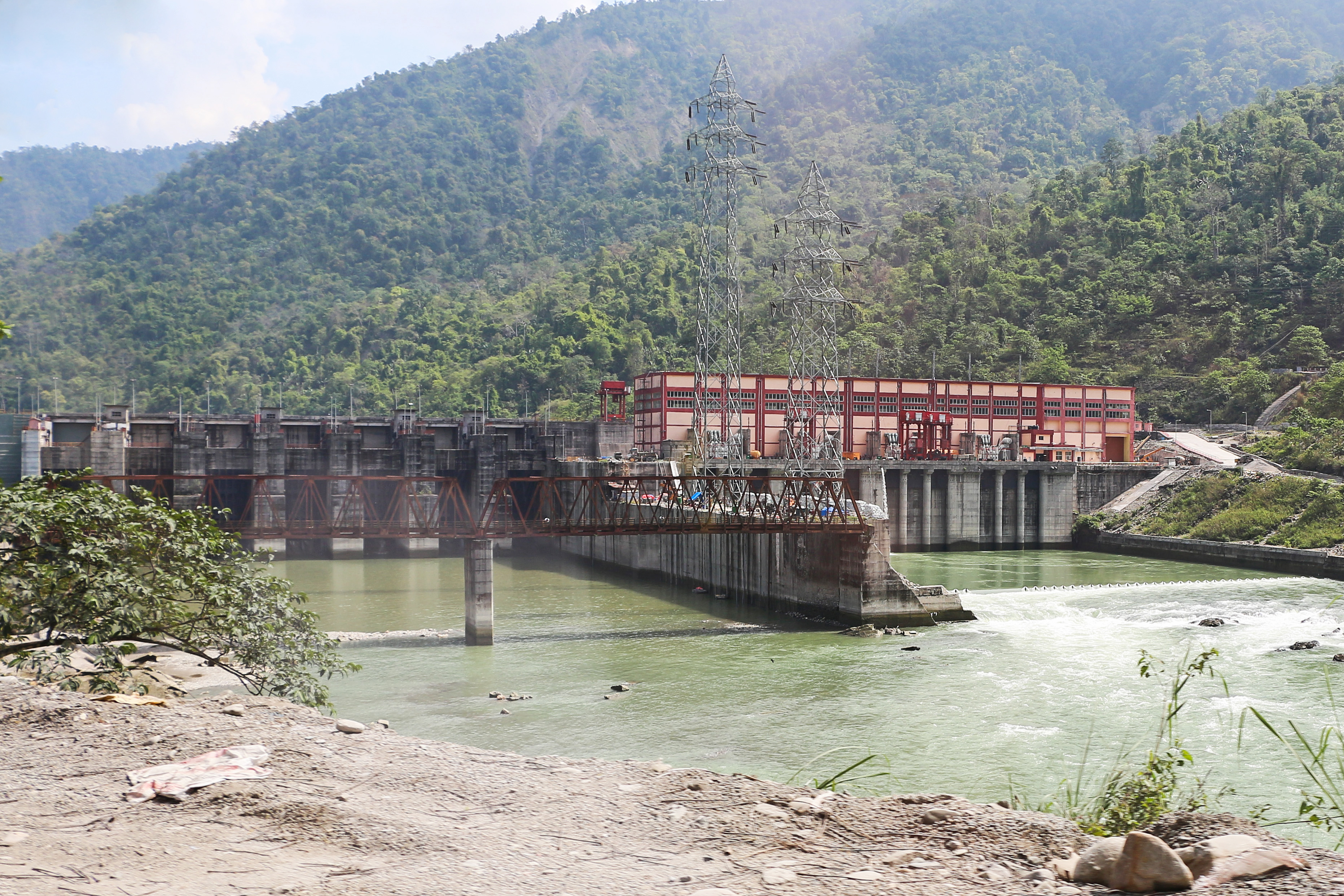
Teesta Low Dam-IV, West Bengal

S.no.	Power Plant	State	Commissioned Capacity (MW)	year of commission
1	Baira Siul	Himachal Pradesh	180	1981
2	Loktak	Manipur	105	1983
3	Salal	Jammu and Kashmir	690	1987
4	Tanakpur	Uttarakhand	120	1992
5	Chamera-I	Himachal Pradesh	540	1994
6	Uri-I	Jammu and Kashmir	480	1997
7	Rangit Dam	Sikkim	60	1999
8	Chamera II Hydroelectric Plant	Himachal Pradesh	300	2004
9	Indira Sagar*	Madhya Pradesh	1000	2005
10	Dhauliganga-I	Uttarakhand	280	2005
11	Dul Hasti	Jammu and Kashmir	390	2007
12	Omkareshwar*	Madhya Pradesh	520	2007
13	Teesta-V	Sikkim	510	2008
14	Sewa-II	Jammu and Kashmir	120	2010
15	Chamera-III	Himachal Pradesh	231	2012
16	Teesta Low Dam - III Hydropower Plant	West Bengal	132	2013
17	Nimmo Bazgo	Ladakh	45	2013
18	Chutak	Ladakh	44	2012–13
19	Uri-II	Jammu and Kashmir	240	2013
20	Parbati-III	Himachal Pradesh	520	2014
21	Jaisalmer Wind Farm	Rajasthan	50	2016
22	Teesta Low Dam - IV Hydropower Plant	West Bengal	160	2016
23	Kishenganga	Jammu and Kashmir	330	2018
24	Theni Solar farm	Tamil Nadu	50	2018
25	Parbati II	Himachal Pradesh	800	2025
26	Floating Solar Power Project-Omkareshwar NHDC	Madhya Pradesh	88	2024
27	Sanchi Solar Power Project*	Madhya Pradesh	8	2024
28	Kalpi Solar Power Project (BSUL) 65 MW	Uttar Pradesh	65	2022

*Joint Venture with Madhya Pradesh (M.P.) Government through NHDC

=== Hydro Power Projects Under construction ===
Total – 18399 MW (As of April 2025)

S.no.	Power Projects	State	Total Capacity (MW)	Completion Schedule
1	Subansiri (Lower)	Arunachal Pradesh	2000	2020
2	Pakal Dul*	Jammu & Kashmir	1000	2024
3	Kiru*	Jammu & Kashmir	625	2024
4	Ratle*	Jammu & Kashmir	850	
5	Kwar*	Jammu & Kashmir	540	2026
6	Subansiri Upper Project	Arunachal Pradesh	2000	2031
7	Dibang Multipurpose Project	Arunachal Pradesh	2880	2034
8	Rangit-IV Project	Sikkim	120	2026
9	Teesta-VI Project	Sikkim	500	2026
10	Kamala H.E. Project	Arunachal Pradesh	1800	2031
11	Dulhasti Stage-II	Jammu & Kashmir	258	2030
12	Uri-I Stage-II	Jammu & Kashmir	240	2030
13	Sawalkote Project	Jammu & Kashmir	1856	2035
14	Kirthai Stage-II*	Jammu and Kashmir	930	2032
15	West Seti H.E. Project	Nepal	750	2029
16	Seti River-6 (SR-6) Project	Nepal	450	2029
17	Phukot Karnali H.E. Project	Nepal	480	2029
18	Teesta-IV H.E. Project	Sikkim	520	2030
19	Solar Power Project at Khavda-1	Gujrat	200	2026
20	Rajasthan Solar Power Project	Rajasthan	300	2026
21	1000MW CPSUs Scheme Solar Project, Andhra Pradesh	Andhra Pradesh	100	2026

*Under JV through Chenab Valley Power Projects (P) Limited, in Kishtwar District of J&K.

On 20 July 2026, a suspected methane-gas explosion caused a collapse in a seven-kilometre tunnel under construction for NHPC's 500 MW Teesta Stage-VI Hydroelectric Project near Samardung, Sikkim. By the following day, at least 12 people had died and 13 remained trapped, while rescue operations were hindered by methane, carbon monoxide and hydrogen sulfide inside the tunnel.

=== Hydropower & Pump Storage (PSP) Projects Under Investigation ===
Sl. No.	Projects	State	Total Capacity (MW)	Completion Schedule
1	Siang Upper Project	Arunachal Pradesh	11000	2035
2	Kengadi PSP	Maharashtra	1550	2035
3	Savitri PSP	Maharashtra	2250	2035
4	Kalu PSP	Maharashtra	1150	2034
5	Jalond PSP	Maharashtra	2400	2035
6	Masinta PSP	Odisha	1000	2035
7	Yaganti PSP*	Andhra Pradesh	1000	2035
8	Rajupalem PSP*	Andhra Pradesh	800	2034

*Under Joint Venture with Andhra Pradesh Power Generation Corp. Ltd (APGENCO)

=== Solar, Wind & Hydrogen Power Projects ===
Sl.No.	Project	State	Total Capacity (MW)	Completion Schedule
1	Mirzapur Jagir Solar PV Park*	Uttar Pradesh	100	2027
2	Madhogarh Solar Power Project*	Uttar Pradesh	600	2028
3	Jalaun Solar Park Project*	Uttar Pradesh	1200	2028
4	Floating Solar Project Rengali	Odisha	300	2026
5	Hydrogen Mobility Station Kargil	Ladakh	500KW	2026

- Under Joint Venture with Uttar Pradesh Government BUNDELKHAND SAUR URJA LIMITED (BSUL)

=== Scheduling and Dispatch ===
The Scheduling and dispatch of all the generating stations owned by National Hydro Power Corporation is done by the respective Regional Load Dispatch Centres which are the apex body to ensure the integrated operation of the power system grid in the respective region. All these load dispatch centres come under Power System Operation Corporation Limited (POSOCO).

== Awards and recognition ==
- Winner at Dun & Bradstreet-Everest Infra Awards 2015 in the Power Generation (Renewable Energy) category recognising its performance under the category.
- 'Gold Shield' for the year 2013–14 in the category of 'Early Completion of Hydro Power Projects' for Unit −3 (15 MW) of its Nimoo Bazgo Hydro Electric Project, Jammu & Kashmir, at a function held in Vigyan Bhawan, New Delhi on 3 June 2015.
- "CBIP Award for Best Performing Utility in Power Sector" at CBIP Awards on CBIP Day on 1 January 2015 in New Delhi.
- "Most Valuable PSU under Mini Ratna Category" at the India Today Group PSU Awards on 21 August 2014 in New Delhi.
- "Most Eco-Friendly Award" and "Most Valuable Company Award" in the Mini Ratna Category at the second India Today Group PSU Awards held on 14 December 2015.
- "Best Performing Utility in Hydro Power Sector" at the CBIP Award held at New Delhi on 29 December 2015.
- "Award for excellence in cost management" held at New Delhi on 28 May 2016. The award – instituted by The Institute of Cost Accountants of India – recognises NHPC's efforts in implementing effective cost management practices.
- "Best Hydropower Enterprise Award" by Hydropower Forum of India under the aegis of Enertia Foundation and Renewable Energy Promotion Association at the 2nd India Hydro Awards 2016 held at New Delhi on 10 June 2016.
- "Best Mini Ratna" at Dun & Bradstreet PSU Awards 2016.
- Awarded Second Prize by Ministry of Home Affairs, Govt. of India for the year 2015–16 under "Rajbhasha Kirti Puruskar" scheme for commendable work in the implementation of Rajbhasha amongst Public Sector Undertakings located in Region 'A'.
- NHPC has been conferred with CBIP Awards 2020 for “Outstanding performing utility in hydro power sector” on 19.02.2020.

== References to New Project ==
1. Subansiri Upper Project Allotted to NHPC Ltd. PIB Link
2. Kamala Hydroelectric Project Allotted to NHPC Ltd.
3. Dulhasti Stage-II Project
4. Uri-I Stage-II Project
5. Sawalkote Hydroelectric Project
6. Kirthai Stage-II Hydroelectric Project
7. West Seti Hydroelectric Project
8. Seti River-6 (SR-6) Hydroelectric Project
9. Phukot Karnali Hydroelectric Project
10. Siang Upper Hydroelectric Project NHPC Submitted Pre feasibility Report of Siang Upper Project [1] [2] [3]
11. NHPC completes takeover of Rangit Stage-IV HE Project NHPC signs Definitive Agreement for implementation of ... NHPC completes takeover of Rangit Stage-IV HE Project
12. NHPC to complete Teesta VI hydropower project in Sikkim [1] Patel-Engineering-bags-rs-1251-cr-order-for-500-mw-Teesta-VI [1] NHPC Board Approve merger of Lanco Teesta
13. NHPC-Signs-MOU-with-maharashtra-govt-for-7350-mw-Pumped-Storage-Projects [1] [2] [3]
14. NHPC signs MoU with GRIDCO Odisha, for developing 2 GW Pumped Storage Projects and 1 GW Solar Energy Projects in Odisha.[1] [2] [3] [4]
15. NHPC and APGENCO signs JVA to set up 1.8 GW PSP [1] [2] [3] [4] [5]
16. Construction starts on 2.88GW Dibang hydropower project [1] [2] [3] [4] BHEL wins contract for 2.8GW Dibang Multipurpose
17. NHPC to build India's 520-MW Teesta 4 hydro Project [1]
18. Hydro-mechanical contract tendered for Teesta VI in India [1] [2] [3]
19. NHPC Mirzapur Jagir Solar PV Park, India [1] [2]
20. NHPC Invites Bids for 600 MW Solar Park in Madhogarh, Uttar Pradesh [1] [2]
21. NHPC Invites Bids For EPC Contract To Develop 1,200 MW Solar Power Park [1] [2] [3]
22. NHPC Rengali Reservoir Floating Solar PV Park, India [1] [2] [3]
23. Omkareshwar Floating Solar Power Plant (FSPV) [1] [2] [3]
24. Sanchi Solar Power Project [1] [2] [3] [4] [5]
25. NHPC signs MoU to develop pilot green hydrogen projects [1] [2] [3] [4] [5]
26. NHPC to develop 200 MW Solar Power Project at Khavda,[1] [2] [3] [4] [5]
27. Rajasthan Solar Power Project-NHPC Connects 300MW Solar Power Project [1] [2] [3] [4]
28. NHPC Awards Contracts For CPSU 1000 MW Solar Projects [1] [2] [3] [4] [5] [6]
29. Kalpi Saur Urja Power Project Commissioned [1] [2] [3] [4] [5]
