= Phuktal Monastic School =

School in India

- Location within the state of Jammu and Kashmir, India Phuktal Monastic School (India)

Religion
- Affiliation: Tibetan Buddhism

Location
- Location: Zanskar, Kargil district, Ladakh, Jammu and Kashmir, India
- Country: India
- Coordinates: 33°16′N 77°11′E

Architecture
- Founder: Geshe Lharampa Nagri Choszed
- Established: 1993

Phuktal Monastic School, also known as the Phugtal Monastic School, is set up by the Phuktal Gompa that provides the students of the local Lungnak Valley in south-eastern Zanskar, in the autonomous Himalayan region of Ladakh, in Northern India.

Housed in the Phuktal Gompa, it is the only centre of learning for the remote villages located in the Lungnak Valley, which is cut off from the rest of the Ladakh region and has no direct vehicular connectivity. People ferry supplies on horses, donkeys, and mules in the warmer months, and in the frozen winters, they are transported through the frozen Zanskar River. No fees are charged from the students, and the monastery bears the cost for the room, board and study materials of the students, with help from sponsors. A lot of the students are children from the local farming families in the Lungnak Valley, which are extremely poor and least educated. The older generations are nearly totally uneducated.

== History ==
The school was set up in 1993, at the behest of Geshe Lharampa Nagri Choszed (1920–1998), a native of Tibet, who came to Phuktal in 1959 after the Chinese invasion of Tibet. Nagri Choszed brought with him a high level of Buddhist philosophical education and training, to which the isolated Phuktal monks had had virtually no access for several centuries. He restored the ancient tradition of learning and scholarship at Phuktal and instructed the monks in philosophy, traditional ritual systems, and moral discipline. He also sent out many monks to for the purpose of advance learning at other institutions, who returned to Phuktal and began to teach.

In 2014, the Phuktal Monastic School facility was completed. The new facility had student accommodation and housing, multiple classrooms, staff quarters, offices, a library, the Sowa-Rigpa medicine centre, a kitchen, a dining hall, and a prayer-assembly hall. This helped the school increase its enrolment significantly.

== Curriculum and Student life ==
Complete education is provided, which involves a mix of traditional learning, which ensures preservation of the unique Zanskari cultural and spiritual heritage and the spread of dharma, and modern curriculum, which readies them for the world. The school currently provides primary (grades 1 to 4) and middle school (grades 5 to 8) education, after which students take a transfer to other higher or secondary schools. By that age, the students are older and more mature to leave the valley by themselves. The school has an integrated curriculum and includes natural sciences, social sciences, Hindi, English, and written Tibetan (Bhodi). It also includes traditional Tibetan subjects such as Tibetan Buddhist philosophy and Sowa-Rigpa medicine, the Tibetan science of natural medicine. The Phuktal Gompa maintains a Traditional Tibetan medical clinic and makes many of the natural medicines itself.

As future members of the Gompa, the students are trained in all aspects of monastic life and life as a monk, including prayers, rituals, festivals, hymns, among other things. The day of the student begins early, with prayers at sunrise followed by exercise, and then learning. Classrooms are often open to the air.

The teaching faculty of the Phuktal Monastic School consists of Geshes, the Tibetan Buddhist equivalent of a master's degree, and is an academic degree for monks and nuns. Geshes are responsible for not only imparting education to their students on subjects in the curriculum, but also all aspects of dormitory life, since students often live at the Monastery during their school life. At present, there are three Geshes at the school.

== Phuktal River Blockade and Floods ==
On 31 December 2014, a landlisde occurred between the Shun and Phuktal villages. This caused the formation of a landslide dam on the Phuktal River. It was first noticed due to the recession in the water level of the Nimoo Bazgo Hydroelectric Plant down the river. The lake formed behind the dam increased in length and height as compared to the height of the blockade. In May 2015, the Phuktal River flooded and washed away the entire school campus. The building, equipment, materials, and stores were all destroyed. The monastery has applied to the Jammu and Kashmir State Government and the Central Government for grants and financial aid to help rebuild the school and monastery and undo the damage of the flood.
