= Chutak =

- Village
- Location in Ladakh, India Chutak (India)
- Coordinates: 34°29′45.39″N 76°07′08.46″E
- Country: India
- Union Territory: Ladakh
- District: Leh
- Tehsil: Kargil

Languages
  - Official: Hindi, English
- Time zone: UTC+5:30 (IST)

Chutak (also known as Chhutuk) is a village in the Kargil district of Ladakh, India.

== See also ==
- Chutak Hydroelectric Plant
