= Chamera II Hydroelectric Plant =

Hydroelectric power station in India

Coordinates: 32.473°N 76.253°E

Chamera II is a run of the river hydroelectric dam built by NHPC India. It is a 300 MW (3x100 MW) project built on the Ravi River in Himachal Pradesh. It was commissioned in March 2004.
