= Chamera Dam =

Dam in Himachal Pradesh, India

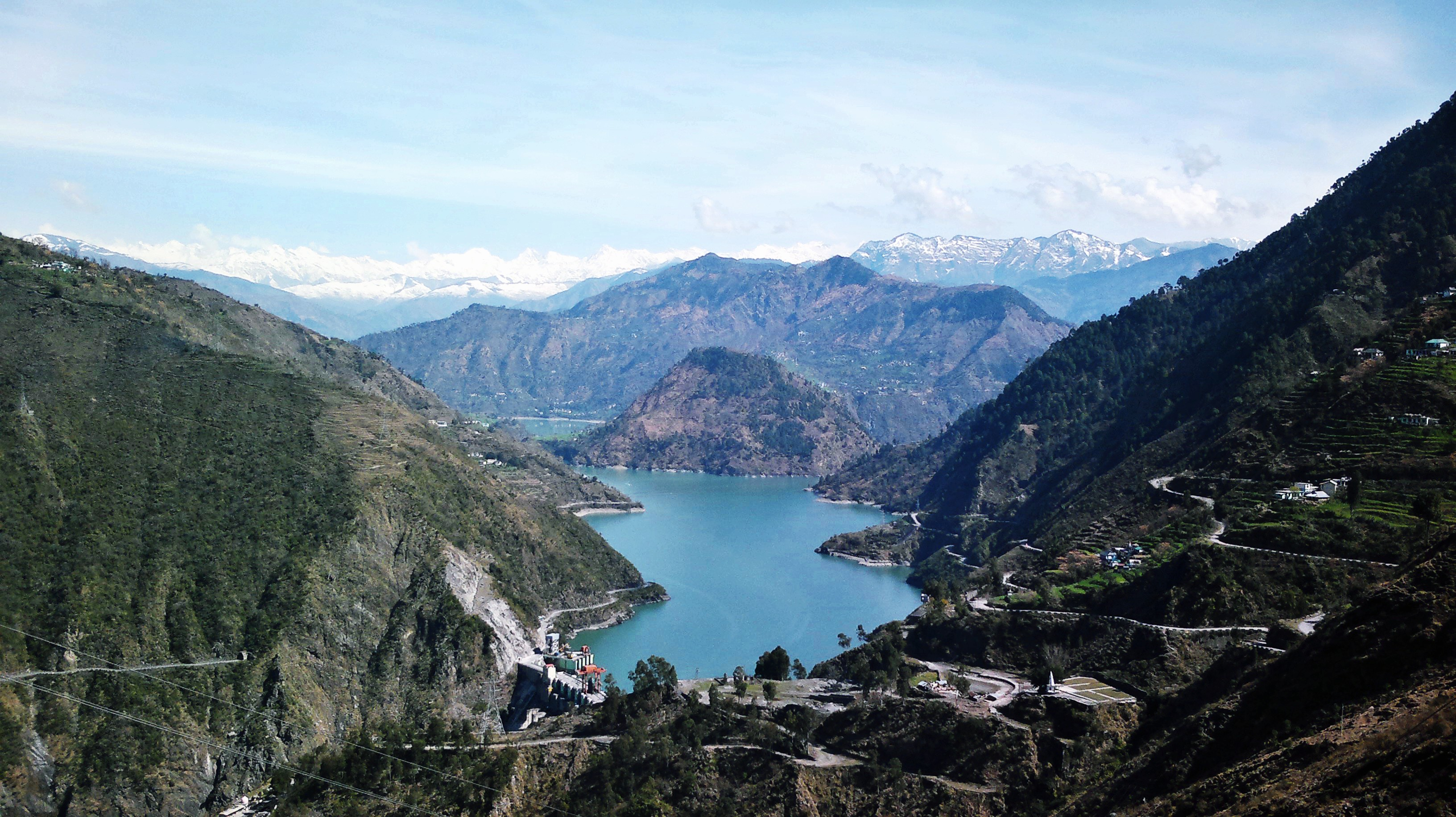
- The dam and reservoir in 2016
- Interactive map of Chamera Dam
- Country: India
- Location: Chamba, Himachal Pradesh
- Coordinates: 32°35′50″N 75°59′09″E
- Purpose: Power
- Status: Operational
- Construction began: 1984
- Opening date: 1994

Dam and spillways
- Type of dam: Gravity dam
- Impounds: Ravi River
- Height (foundation): 226 m (741 ft)
- Height (thalweg): 191 m (627 ft)
- Length: 295 m (968 ft)

Reservoir
- Creates: Chamera Lake
- Total capacity: 391 GL (317,000 acre⋅ft)
- Surface area: 950 ha (2,300 acres)
- Normal elevation: 763 m (2,503 ft)

Chamera-I hydroelectric plant
- Coordinates: 32°35′48″N 75°59′09″E
- Commission date: 1994
- Type: Conventional
- Turbines: 3 x 180 MW (240×10^{3} hp)
- Installed capacity: 540 MW (720×10^{3} hp)
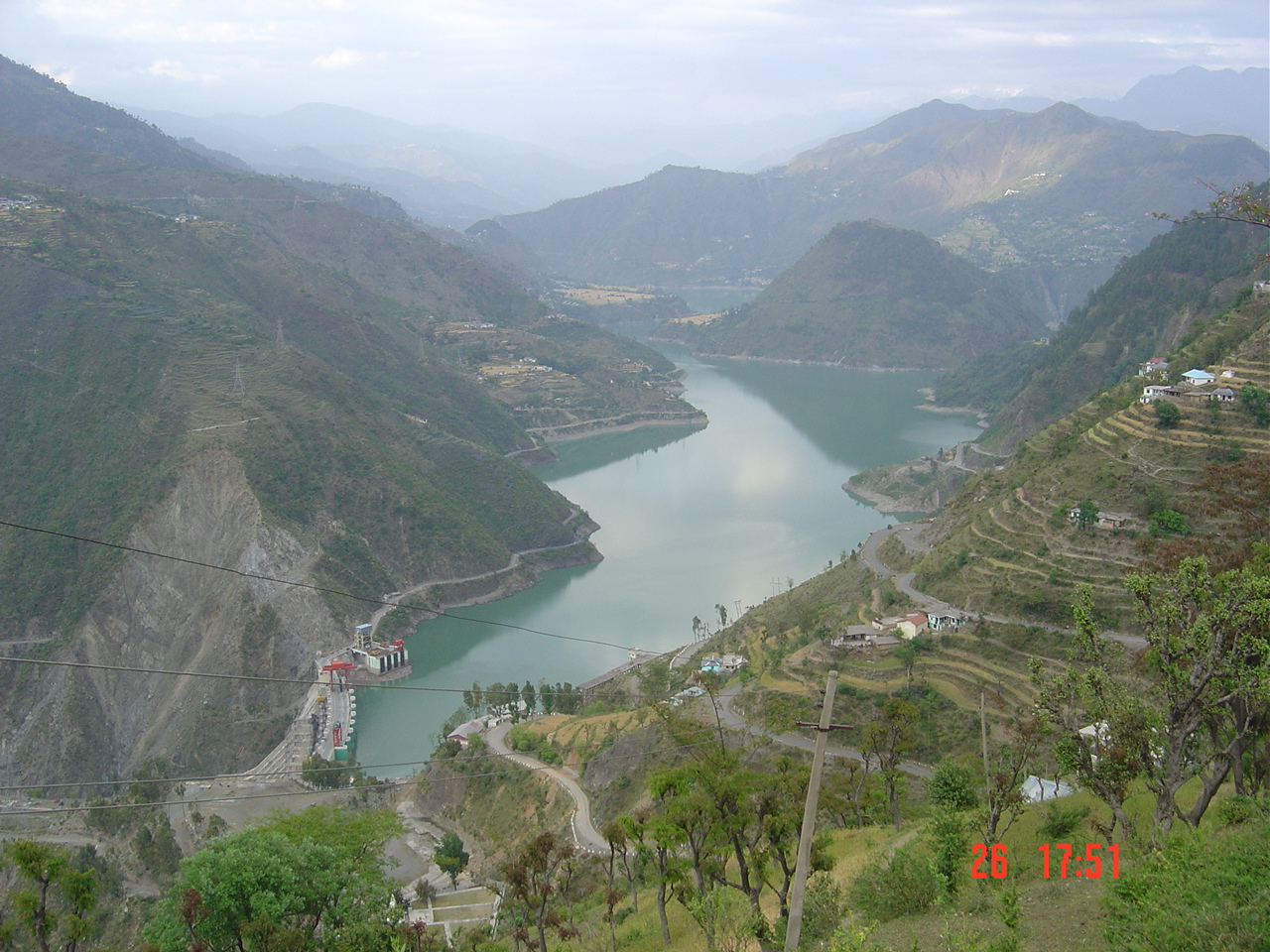

Chamera-II hydroelectric plant
- Coordinates: 32°28′24″N 76°15′19″E
- Commission date: 2003
- Type: Run-of-the-river
- Turbines: 3 x 100 MW (130×10^{3} hp)
- Installed capacity: 300 MW (400×10^{3} hp)
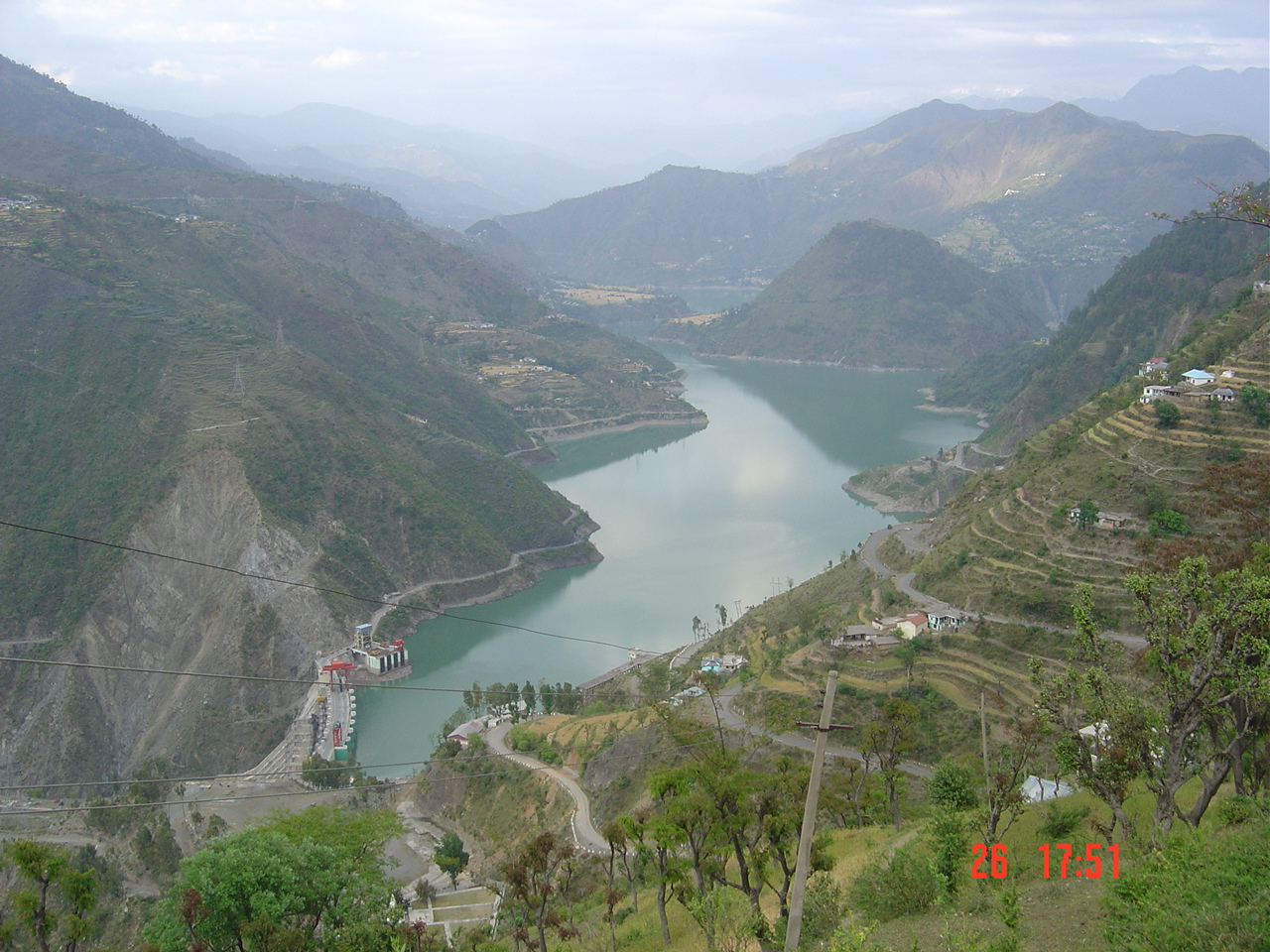

Chamera-III hydroelectric plant
- Coordinates: 32°27′35″N 76°14′39″E
- Commission date: 2012
- Type: Run-of-the-river
- Turbines: 3 x 77 MW (103×10^{3} hp)
- Installed capacity: 231 MW (310×10^{3} hp)

The Chamera Dam is a concrete gravity dam across the River Ravi, located near the town of Dalhousie, in the Chamba district in the state of Himachal Pradesh in India. A large proportion of the resultant reservoir, called Chamera Lake, lies in the Salooni sub-division of Chamba and was established for the purpose of generating hydroelectricity.

The Chamera hydroelectric plants were completed in three phases in 1994, 2003 and 2012. The first plant uses conventional hydroelectric methods for generating power, whilst the second two plants use run-of-the-river methods. The combined generating capacity of the three plants is 1,071 megawatts (1.436×10^{6} hp).

== Overview ==
Commenced in 1984, the Chamera Dam is 226 metres (741 ft) high and 295 metres (968 ft) long. When full, the reservoir has a capacity of 391 gigalitres (317,000 acre⋅ft) and covers 950 hectares (2,300 acres) at an elevation of 763 metres (2,503 ft), drawn from a catchment area of 472.5 square kilometres (182.4 sq mi). The minimum water level for the power plant to operate is 747 metres (2,451 ft).

During the first phase, in 1994 three Francis-type turbines were commissioned, each with generating capacity of 180 megawatts (240×10^{3} hp); or 540 megawatts (720×10^{3} hp) in total. In the second phase, in 2003, another three turbines were commissioned, each with generating capacity of 100 megawatts (130×10^{3} hp); or 300 megawatts (400×10^{3} hp) in total. In the third phase, in 2012, another three turbines were commissioned, each with generating capacity of 77 megawatts (103×10^{3} hp); or 231 megawatts (310×10^{3} hp) in total.

The Chamera Dam and hydroelectric power stations are owned and operated by National Hydroelectric Power Corporation (or NHPC Limited), a public-listed company. (NSE: NHPC).

== Environment ==
The unique feature of the region is the fluctuating day and night temperature. The temperature during the day near the dam rises up to 35 °C (95 °F) and drops to a minimum of 18 to 20 °C (64 to 68 °F) at night.

== See also ==
- List of conventional hydroelectric power stations
- List of dams and reservoirs in India
- List of run-of-the-river hydroelectric power stations
