= Upper Siang Hydroelectric Project =

Hydroelectric project in Upper Siang, Arunachal Pradesh, India

Upper Siang Multipurpose Project
- Location within Arunachal Pradesh
- Country: India
- Location: Upper Siang district, Arunachal Pradesh
- Coordinates: 28.4963°N 95.1005°E
- Purpose: Hydroelectric & Flood control
- Status: Pre-construction works
- Construction began: 2028 (Expected)
- Opening date: 2032 (Expected)
- Construction cost: US$ 13 billion
- Owner: Government of Arunachal Pradesh
- Operator: NHPC

Dam and spillways
- Impounds: Siang River

Reservoir
- Total capacity: 320 tmcft
- Maximum length: 100
- Maximum width: 10
- Maximum water depth: 300 meters
- Normal elevation: 580

Power Station
- Operator: NHPC
- Commission date: 2032
- Installed capacity: 11,000 MW (under construction)
- Annual generation: 47 billion kWh

The Upper Siang Hydroelectric Project, also known as the Upper Siang Multipurpose Project or Siang Upper Multipurpose Project (SUMP) is the biggest hydroelectric power project planned in the Upper Siang district of Arunachal Pradesh, India. Projects planning was commenced by the National Hydroelectric Power Corporation (NHPC) in April 2009 and various hydro dams will be constructed in phases over a span of 15–20 years.

The main dam is being constructed across the Siang river and upon completion, the dam reservoir will hold 9 billion cubic meters of water. The hydro power project at Siang will alone generate approximately 11,000 MW, making it the largest hydroelectric dam in the Indian subcontinent.

The dam was proposed to counter the Yaxia Hydropower Project, an upstream dam project initiated by the Chinese government, by storing water and blocking potential floods from the upstream dam being broken.

== Design specifications ==
The main dam is planned to be 280 meters tall, and will hold 9 billion cubic meters of water. It is expected to generate approximately 11,000 MW of electricity.

== Concerns ==
=== Floods ===
In 2006, Indian media reported that the NHPC was planning to relocate and scale down the project due to concerns on flooding upstream by Chinese government. However, the situation has reversed due to construction of many tall dams/massive storage reservoirs in the river basin area effecting river's natural flow regime in downstream India.

In 2025, NHPC is conducting pre-feasibility studies for site selection. The height of the dam is nearly 300 meters above the river bed level at dam location to store water up to 750 m MSL. The back waters of the reservoir would touch the foot of the last stage of the Medog Hydropower Station (60,000 MW) being constructed on the upstream river in Tibet/China so that adequate flood buffer is maintained to safely discharge the peak floods arising out of upstream dam failures due to earthquakes, Glacial Lake Outburst Floods and massive land slides. This reservoir acts as a regulating basin to release the continuous flows downstream according to the river flow regime when the water released from the upstream mega power station in China is regulated or intermittent as per the needs of power generation on daily and weekly basis.

The state government of Arunachal Pradesh signed deals with various Indian power companies to develop hydro projects. A total of 42 schemes are planned to generate electricity in excess of 27,000 MW with the Upper Siang project being one of them.

=== Environmental impact ===
In 2010, a student body appealed to India's Environment Ministry to scrap various hydroelectric projects (including Siang project) in Assam and Arunachal Pradesh due to potential adverse environmental impact. However, the Ministry remarked that though the projects will not be cancelled, necessary precautions will be undertaken to ensure minimal environmental impact.

=== Impact on local communities ===
The proposed site of the dam is home to the Adi people, who have opposed the dam on grounds of losses of land, culture, and identity. Protests and riots in 2026 were spurred by fears of the loss of homes and land to the dam, resulting in clashes with police and damage to buildings.
