= Salooni =

Tehsil headquarters and sub-division in Chamba district of Himachal Pradesh, India

- town
- Location in Himachal Pradesh, India Salooni (India)
- Coordinates: 32°43′N 76°3′E
- Country: India
- State: Himachal Pradesh
- District: Chamba
- Elevation: 1,829 m (6,001 ft)
- Time zone: UTC+5:30 (IST)
- PIN: 176320
- Telephone code: 01896
- Vehicle registration: HP 81
- Nearest city: Dalhousie Chamba
- Vidhan Sabha constituency: Dalhousie
- Website: www.salooni.co.in

Salooni is the tehsil headquarters and sub-division in Chamba district of Himachal Pradesh, India. Salooni is an important regional administrative and economic centre. It has a mini secretariat, SDM office, government senior secondary school, Degree College, CSK HP Krishi Vishvavidyalaya Mountain Agriculture Research and Extension Stations, community health centre and many other sub-division level important government offices. Salooni falls under Dalhousie legislative constituency. The entrance to the small township has a series of few quaint shops, followed by small ground with an ancient goddess Kali temple at other end.

== History ==
Salooni according to one version is believed to be a corrupt form of "Sailani" (tourist) who frequented the place since the time of the rajas. Other versions says because of its beauty, the place was called "Saloni" which in English meant attractive and charming. Saloni, therefore, is the origin of Salooni.

== Geography ==
Chamba is wholly mountainous with few plain valleys in between two mountain ranges and alongside rivers. It lies between Dhauladhar and Pir Panjal Ranges.

Salooni Village, Chamba is surrounded by places of interest and look out points. The town is situated on top of a ridge extending in Bhaderwah Sub Division of Jammu and Kashmir. The two mountains ranges i.e Dhauladhar and Pir Panjal enclose Salooni, at a height of 1729 meters and 56 48 km from Chamba, which offers a panoramic view of the snow-covered hills and peaks of both ranges. The watershed of the ridge forms a tributary of Ravi known as Siul which forms the Bhandal and Kihar valleys upstream. The Gamgul Siyabehi Wildlife Sanctuary is also present here which inhabits the unique Kashmiri Stag. Salooni is known for its view of the Pir Panjal Range, from which one can see this range which is usually snow-capped all around the year. It has a population of about 2000.

== Physical features ==
- Salooni, at a height of 1,829 meters (6,001 ft) and 56 km (35 mi) from Chamba, offers a panoramic view of the snow-covered hills and peaks. It begins with a range of about 7,000 feet (2,100 m) between the Pir Panjal and the Dhauladhar and a place called Salooni. Salooni is a vantage point for some of the finest views in this kaleidoscopic topography. It stares into the Bhandal valley. This place links Chamba with Kashmir Valley. The Salooni is also known for its Apple Orchards, vegetables and toughest roads.
- Bhandal Valley (1,730 m (5,680 ft)) (trek to Kishtwar J&k)

The Bhandal Valley with its wealth of wildlife is at the western extremity of Himachal Pradesh. Approachable from Chamba, it is the base for a trek route that connects Chamba to the Kishtwar region of Jammu and Kashmir over the Dagni Dhar. The route begins along the right bank of the River Ravi, goes past Pukhri, down to the Siyul stream, then rises to Salooni on the Prithvi Jor ridge to finally arrive above the valley. From Bhandal via Langhera one reaches Kishtwar J&K. The highest road on the track is the Padri Gali at 3,200 m (10,500 ft).

- Salooni has also been featured in Bollywood movies including Badhaai Ho Badhaai, Vinashak – Destroyer and Dor.

== Tourist sites ==
- Salooni forms the part of Dalhousie valley and is shares its border with Bhaderwah valley of Jammu and Kashmir and the Salooni Valley.
- Khadma Valley in Salooni Khadma valley is part of Kharal valley Shri Nag Devta Temple Sarolla, Natural Lekh and Nag Devta Temple in Sarar, Khadma to Shri Garh Mata Temble (approximately 15 km (9.3 mi) on foot) by Trund Mata. Garh mata Mandir is one of several religious organizations located in At Border jammu and kashmir and H.P.
- The Gamgul Siahbehi Wildlife Sanctuary lies 20 km from Salooni with Musk deer, Barking deer, Snow Leopards, Himalayas tahr, Pheasants, Rabbits and large species of fauna and colourful birds. The place is revered to be home of the rare ‘Kashmir Stag’. It is a one of a kind place to be and attracts many photographers and wildlife enthusiasts. It lies at an average height of 1,800 to 3,600 m (5,900 to 11,800 ft). It has an area of 106 km^{2} (41 sq mi). Western Tragopan can be found at Gamgul Sanctuary and nearby places.
- Baira Siul is a hydropower project on the riverbank in Surgani. It is the first project of the NHPC in India and produces 180 megawatts of electricity.
- Taleru boating point is the only boating spot in the locality. Boating is done on the lake formed by Chamera Dam. The lake was formed naturally while the dam construction happened and is a lovely place for a picnic and quite frequented by the locals too. In the Movie ‘Dor’ this lake was pictured during the song ‘Yeh hausala kaise juhke’.
- Bhalei Mata Temple, situated 28 km (17 mi) from Salooni toward Dalhousie, is an ancient temple with a portrait of Kali Mata. It also is surrounded by panoramic views.
- Saach Pass is about 107 km (66 mi) from Salooni via Surgani and 80 km (50 mi) via Himgari.
- Padri Pass joining Bhandal valley of Salooni to Bhaderwah valley of Jammu & Kashmir is at a distance of 45 km (28 mi) from Salooni.
- Temple of Mata anjani is in the middle of a lake which is surrounded by green lush meadows. The lake and temple is in khadjauta Gram panchayat but it is easily accessible from the point bhadela which is about 40 km (25 mi) from tehsil hq suggested to travel in morning time as there is no restaurant etc. nearby

From bhadela it is about 4 km (2.5 mi) on foot.

== Rest house ==
There are number of rest houses in locality, run by HPPWD, IPH Department and Forest Department. The HPPWD rest house in Salooni is constructed way back in 1908. It is surrounded by deodar trees. Salooni has quite a few other rest houses owned by IPH Department and various other government departments. Other nearby rest houses are in Kihar, Sundala, Dhargala, Bhandal, Himgiri and Diur.

== Climate ==
There is snowfall between December and March, when temperatures may fall down to −10 °C (14 °F) in some areas of Salooni. In summers temperatures seldom crosses 30 °C (86 °F). Weather throughout the year is pleasant. Annual rainfall is 1,490 mm (59 in).

== Transport ==
Salooni is well connected to Chamba by road. It also has a helipad.
