= Subansiri Lower Dam =

Dam in Assam and Arunachal Pradesh

Subansiri Lower Project
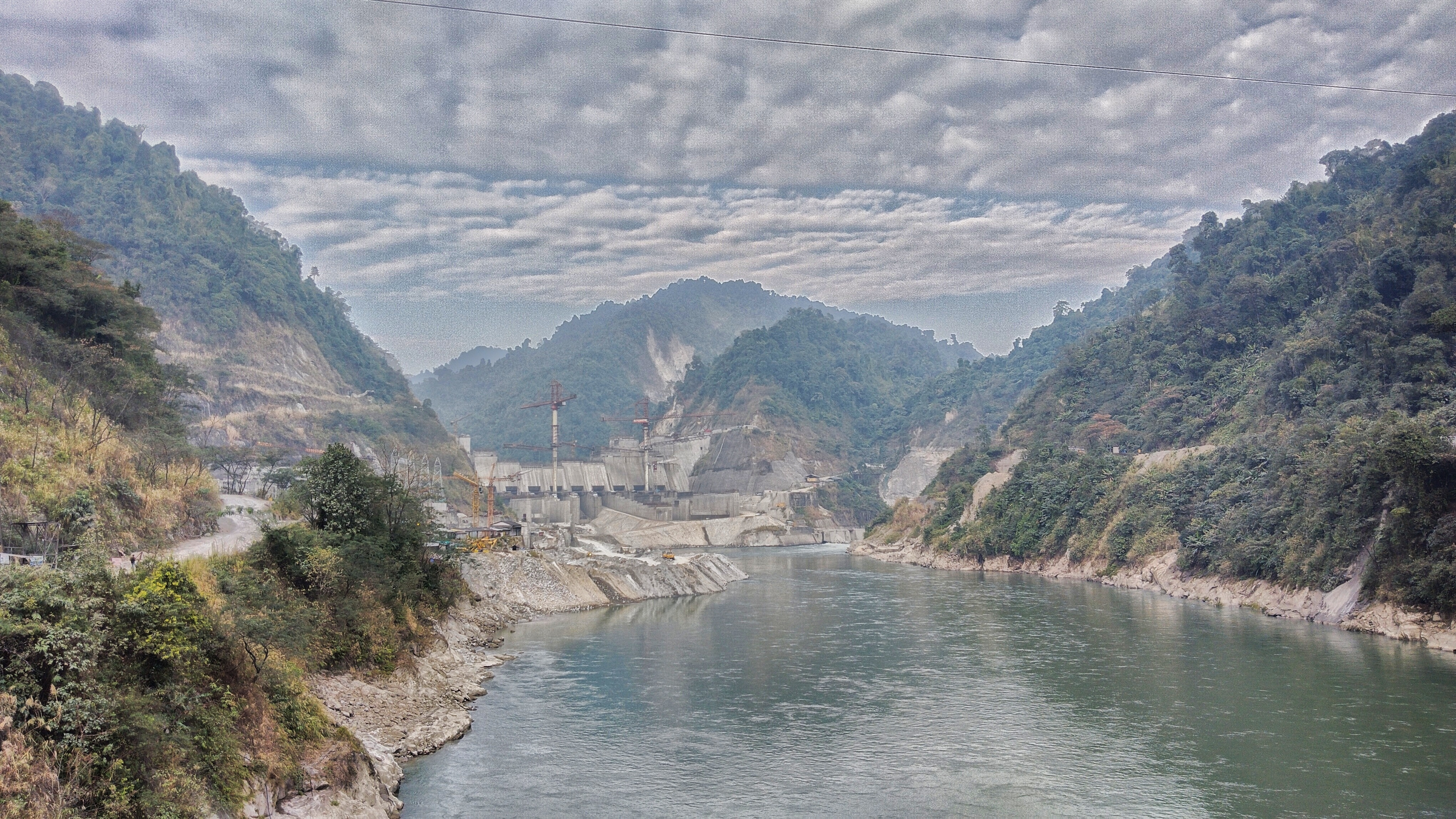
- Lower Subansiri Dam under construction, Arunachal Pradesh, and Assam, India
- Interactive map of Subansiri Lower Project
- Official name: Subansiri Lower Hydroelectric Power Project (LSHEP)
- Country: India
- Location: Arunachal Pradesh Assam
- Coordinates: 27°33′13″N 94°15′31″E
- Status: Operational
- Construction began: December 2007
- Opening date: March 2026
- Construction cost: Rs. 86 billion (2026 est.)
- Owner: NHPC Limited

Dam and spillways
- Type of dam: Concrete gravity
- Impounds: Lower Subansiri River
- Height: 116 m (381 ft)
- Height (foundation): 130 m (427 ft)
- Length: 284 m (932 ft)
- Dam volume: 2,250,000 m^{3} (2,942,889 cu yd)
- Spillway type: Ski jump
- Spillway capacity: 37,500 m^{3}/s (1,324,300 cu ft/s)

Reservoir
- Total capacity: 1.37 km^{3} (1,110,677 acre⋅ft)
- Active capacity: 0.44 km^{3} (356,714 acre⋅ft)
- Surface area: 33.5 km^{2} (13 sq mi)

Power Station
- Operator: NHPC Limited
- Commission date: November 2025
- Type: Run-of-the-river
- Turbines: 8 × 250 MW Francis-type
- Installed capacity: 2,000 MW (max. planned)
- Annual generation: 7,421 GW·h

The Subansiri Lower Dam, officially named Subansiri Lower Hydroelectric Project (SLHEP), is a gravity dam on the Subansiri River in North Eastern India. It is located 2.3 km (1.4 mi) upstream of Subansiri River in Arunachal Pradesh. Described as a run-of-the-river project by NHPC Limited, the project is expected to supply 2,000 MW of power when fully operational. The project has experienced several problems during construction, including landslides, re-design and opposition. As of March 2026, 2 generating units of 250 MW each have been completed, while the remaining 6 units are expected to be commissioned in phases by December 2026.

== Design ==
Subansiri Lower Dam bridge
- Coordinates: 27°33′07″N 94°15′32″E
- Carries: vehicles

Characteristics
- Total length: 150 m (492 ft)
- Width: 150 m (492 ft)

Location
- Interactive map of Subansiri Lower Dam bridge

The concrete gravity dam is designed to be 116 m (381 ft) tall, measured from the river bed and 210 m (690 ft) from the deepest foundation. Its length became 284 m (932 ft) and the dam has a structural volume of 2,250,000 m^{3} (2,942,889 cu yd). The reservoir created by the dam now has a gross storage capacity of 1.37 km^{3} (1,110,677 acre⋅ft), of which .44 km^{3} (356,714 acre⋅ft) can be used for power generation or irrigation. At normal level, the reservoir's surface covered 33.5 km^{2} (13 sq mi). The surface powerhouse, located on the right bank, will contain eight 250 MW Francis turbine generators using 86 m design head out of 91 m gross head available.

There will be eight horse shoe shaped head race tunnels, each being 9.5 m (31 ft) in diameter and having a length from 608–1,168 m (1,995–3,832 ft). There will be eight horse Shoe shaped surge tunnels, each being 9.5 m (31 ft) in diameter and having length from 400–485 m (1,312–1,591 ft). There will be eight horse shoe/circular shaped penstocks with varying diameters of 7–9.5 m (23–31 ft) and lengths of168–190 m (551–623 ft). The tail race channel, which will transfer water discharged by the turbines back to the river, is 206 m (676 ft) wide and 35 m (115 ft) long.

When complete, the hydroelectric generators will begin generating 500 MW of electricity, gradually increasing to 2000 MW.

== Construction ==
Construction of Subansiri Lower Project involves many challenges. These include land not being available when construction was scheduled to commence, a limited annual construction time because of monsoons (from mid-April to mid-October), the need to handle high flood flows and poor rock conditions. The design of the dam has undergone drastic and repeated revisions that have affected the schedule and planning of the construction work.

In December 2003 the contract to build the dam and its associated structures was awarded to a consortium of Boguchandgesstroy, Soyuzgidrosptsstry and Soma Enterprise Ltd. Due to difficulties acquiring land around the site, construction could not begin in earnest until 13 months after the contract was awarded. Unexpected geological conditions at the dam site led to landslides and slower tunnel excavation. By November 2007, the river was successfully diverted and in April of the next year, the foundation was clear for construction. Before the foundation was fully prepared it was discovered that bedrock was reached 10 m (33 ft) sooner than expected. This led to an alteration in the dam's design for stability. While the dam was being re-designed, concrete was placed over the foundation to protect it from the upcoming monsoon floods as the cofferdams stood a good chance of not protecting the foundation from the strong floods. The re-design was completed in October 2008 and soon after the foundation was once again cleared. In May 2009, work was suspended because of the monsoon season and re-commenced in November of that year.

As of November 2011, the dam reached an elevation of 138 m (453 ft), just below the spillway elevation of 145 m (476 ft). On 16 December 2011, construction equipment was halted by protests fueled by concerns of the project's environmental and social impacts on the downstream dwellers.

The construction cost has gone up by about ₹1,200 crore owing to forced suspension of work since December 2011. NHPC has already spent about ₹6,600 crore, according to a status report prepared by the company.

By mid-2023, the elevation of the dam had reached 210m above sea level.

In October 2023, another landslide impacted construction, as part of a hill collapsed into the reservoir, blocking a tunnel and stopping water flowing into the Subansiri river.

== Environmental impact ==
Some environmental impacts unique to very large dams will result from completion of the Subansiri Project, both upstream and downstream of the dam site. These impacts will include ecosystem damage and loss of land.

The reservoir of the Subansiri Project will submerge a 47 km (29 mi) length of the Subansiri river and occupy 37.5–40 km^{2} (14.5–15.4 sq mi) which includes Himalayan subtropical pine forests, Himalayan subtropical broadleaf forests, part of the Tale Valley Wildlife Sanctuary, an elephant corridor and some subsistence agriculture fields.

Thirty eight families will be displaced when the dam's reservoir will be fully filled, according to official data.

Downstream

Water flow downstream will be regulated by the dam which is expected to result in low releases (6 m^{3}/s) during winter and very high releases (2,560 m^{3}/s) when energy is being generated.

The project has met stiff resistance from several groups including All Assam Students’ Union and the Krishak Mukti Sangram Samiti, who are apprehensive about safety and the project’s downstream impact.
