= Gamgul Siyabehi Wildlife Sanctuary =

Indian wildlife sanctuary in Himachal Pradesh

- IUCN category IV (habitat/species management area)
- Location within Himachal Pradesh Location within India
- Interactive map of Gamgul Siyabehi Wildlife Sanctuary
- Location: Chamba district, Himachal Pradesh, India
- Coordinates: 32.847°N 76.068°E
- Area: 109 km^{2} (42 mi^{2})
- Established: 1949

Gamgul Siyabehi Wildlife Sanctuary is a high-altitude wildlife sanctuary located in the Bhandal valley in Salooni tehsil of Chamba, Himachal Pradesh. The union territory of Jammu and Kashmir adjoins it at the northern end. It's said that this is the only sanctuary located in Himachal Pradesh that has reported Kashmir stag, which used to be present in the region till around 1970.

The sanctuary plays host to a small populations of Musk deer, Himalayan tahr, and pheasants. Also, one can spot number of colourful birds in the area. The vegetation is typical to the higher altitude area, and the landscape is interspersed with deodar forests, coniferous forest and alpine pastures.
