= Uri Dam =

Coordinates: 34.1444°N 74.18545°E

- Interactive map of Uri Dam
- Country: India
- Opening date: 1997

Uri Dam, refers to the existing Uri-I Stage-I Hydroelectric Dam Project with 480 MW hydroelectric power generation capacity and the downstream under-construction Uri-I Stage-II Hydroelectric Dam Project with 240 MW hydroelectric power generation capacity, on the Jhelum River near Uri in Baramula district of the Jammu and Kashmir in India. Operated by the NHPC and located very near to the Line of Control - the de facto border between India and Pakistan, both are run-of-the-river projects because the Indus Waters Treaty (IWT) gives Pakistan the exclusive right to regulate the Jhelum River.

== Stages ==
=== Uri-I Stage-I project ===
Uri-I Stage-I project dam largely built under a hill with a 10 km tunnel. Uri-I Stage-I project, construction of which started in 1989 and completed in 1997, cost approximately Rs. 33 billion (about 450 million EUR or US$660 million) with the partial funding by the Swedish and British governments. The construction was awarded by the National Hydroelectric Power Corporation in October 1989 to a European consortium called Uri Civil led by Swedish Skanska and including Swedish NCC and ABB and British Kvaerner Boving. The workforce included about 200 foreigners and 4,000 Indians, many from the local area.

=== Uri-I Stage-II project ===
Plans for constructing a 240 MW Uri-II plant were announced in 1998, and foundation stone was laid in 2014, and tender for construction was floated in 2025. The delay in construction was caused because the Government of Pakistan objected to the project stating that it violates the Indus Waters Treaty. On 4 July 2014, Prime Minister Narendra Modi laid the foundation stone for the Uri-I Stage-II power project.

== Current status ==
- 2025 Jun: "Uri-I Stage-I" is operational since 1997, and the "Uri-I Stage-II" construction tender were floated in 2025.

== See also ==
- Dams in Jhelum river basin
- Rivers of Jammu and Kashmir
