= Sewa-II =

Coordinates: 32.6762°N 75.8215°E

Sewa-II is a hydroelectric power station located in the Himalayan region in Kathua District Jammu and Kashmir state. It is constructed by NHPC Limited on the Sewa River, a tributary of the Ravi River. Commissioned in 2010, it has a surface power house with the capacity of 120 MW, comprising three Pelton wheel units of 40 MW each, which are fed through a 10 km headrace tunnel from the Sewa II Reservoir, giving a maximum water head of 599m. The Sewa II Dam has a height of 53m. The power station generates 534 GW⋅h annually in a 90% dependable year. The beneficiary states of the project include Jammu & Kashmir, Punjab, Haryana, Uttar Pradesh, Uttarakhand, Delhi, Rajasthan and Union Territory of Chandigarh.
