= Bhalei Mata Temple =

Bhalei Mata
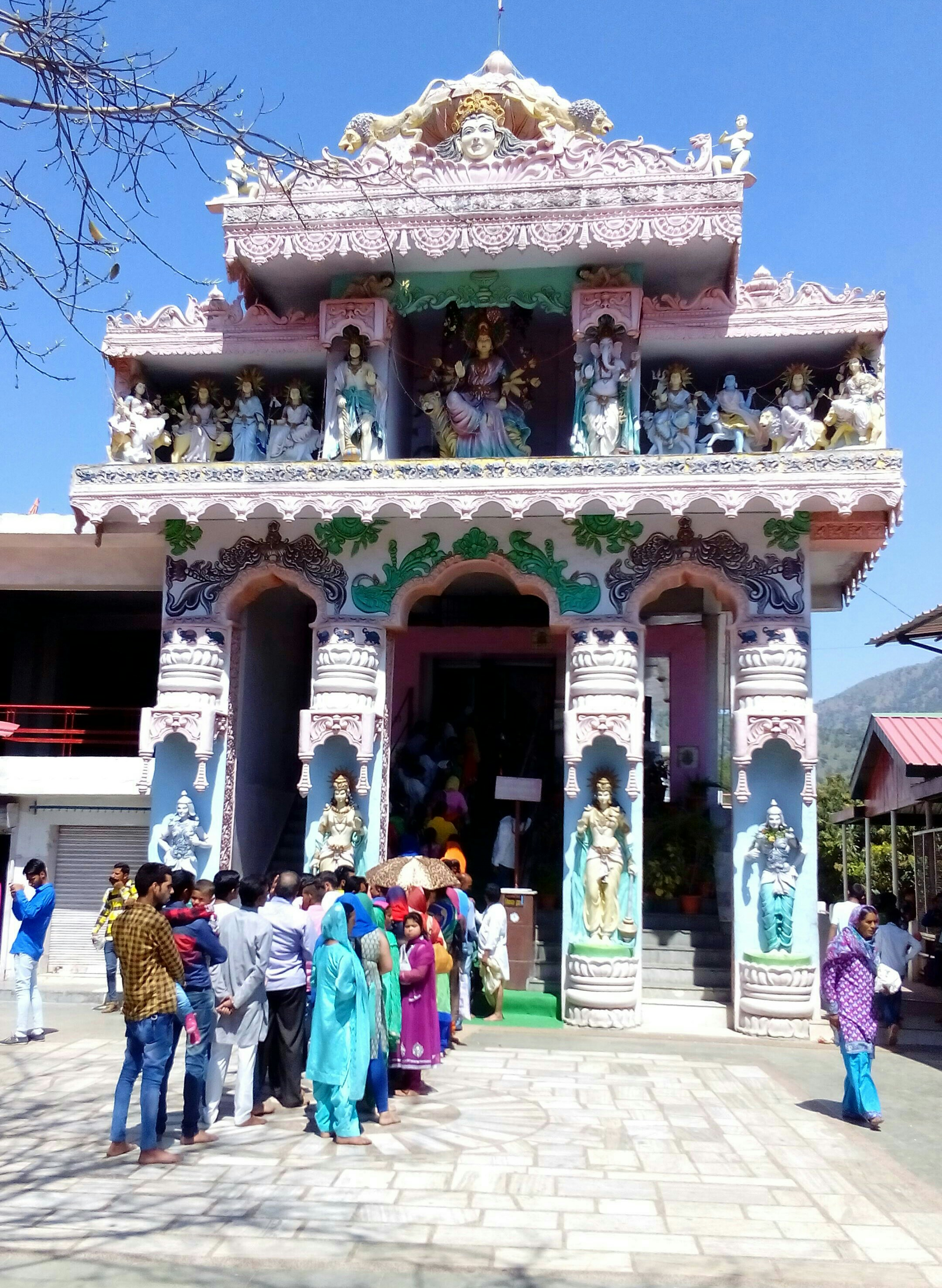
- Bhalei Mata

Religion
- Affiliation: Hinduism
- Deity: Bhader Kali
- Festivals: Navratri, Durga Puja

Location
- Location: Chamba
- State: Himachal Pradesh
- Country: India
- Interactive map of Bhalei Mata
- Coordinates: 32.631°N 76.007°E

Website
- https://bhaleimata.wordpress.com/

Bhalei Mata Temple is dedicated to the Hindu Goddess Bhadra. It is located on a 3,800 feet (1,200 m) high spur in Bhalei, which is now a Sub-Tehsil headquarters. It is about 35 km from Salooni Tehsil headquarters. The temple can be approached either from Chamba or from Dalhousie and is at a distance of 40 kilometres from Chamba and 30 kilometres from Dalhousie. The deity is in the front of an image of black stone of two feet height and is enshrined in the sanctum sanctorum of the temple. Bhadar Kali draws a large number of pilgrims from far and wide. A big havan ceremony is performed during navratras of Ashwin and Chait months.

== History ==
History has it that the temple of Bhadar Kali murti found by Raja Pratap Singh during his reign. He was a religiously disposed king and has to his credit construction, repair and renovation of many temples in the district. The legend is that the deity appeared to Raja Partap Singh in dream and told him that she was lying hidden in a place called Bhran about three kilometres from the present site of temple. The deity asked the Raja to bring her from there and erect a suitable temple for her. The Raja with his officials went to the site and discovered the image. The Raja and his team were very happy they had already decided to construct a temple for the deity in Chamba town. So they started their journey back. On way back they stopped for rest at Bhalei and when they resumed their journey, the bearers could not lift the palanquin of the deity in which she was being taken to Chamba. A Brahman from Kilod village was invited to interpret this peculiar incident. The Brahaman interpreted that the deity did not want to go to Chamba, rather she desired her temple to be erected at the site.

According to another belief, the people of this area were not happy over the idea of the deity being taken to Chamba, so they requested the Raja to construct the temple at Bhalei. Whatever be the reason, the temple was built at Bhalei by Raja Partap Singh and later renovated by Raja Sri Singh. Recently a lot of renovation work has been carried out. Statue of Bhader Kali was unfortunately stolen in the year 1973 by antique thieves but happily recovered at Chohra near the present dam site. It is believed that the image of the deity seems to be perspiring since that event.
