= Nimoo Bazgo Hydroelectric Plant =

Dam in Indian-administered Ladakh, Kashmir region

Alchi Dam
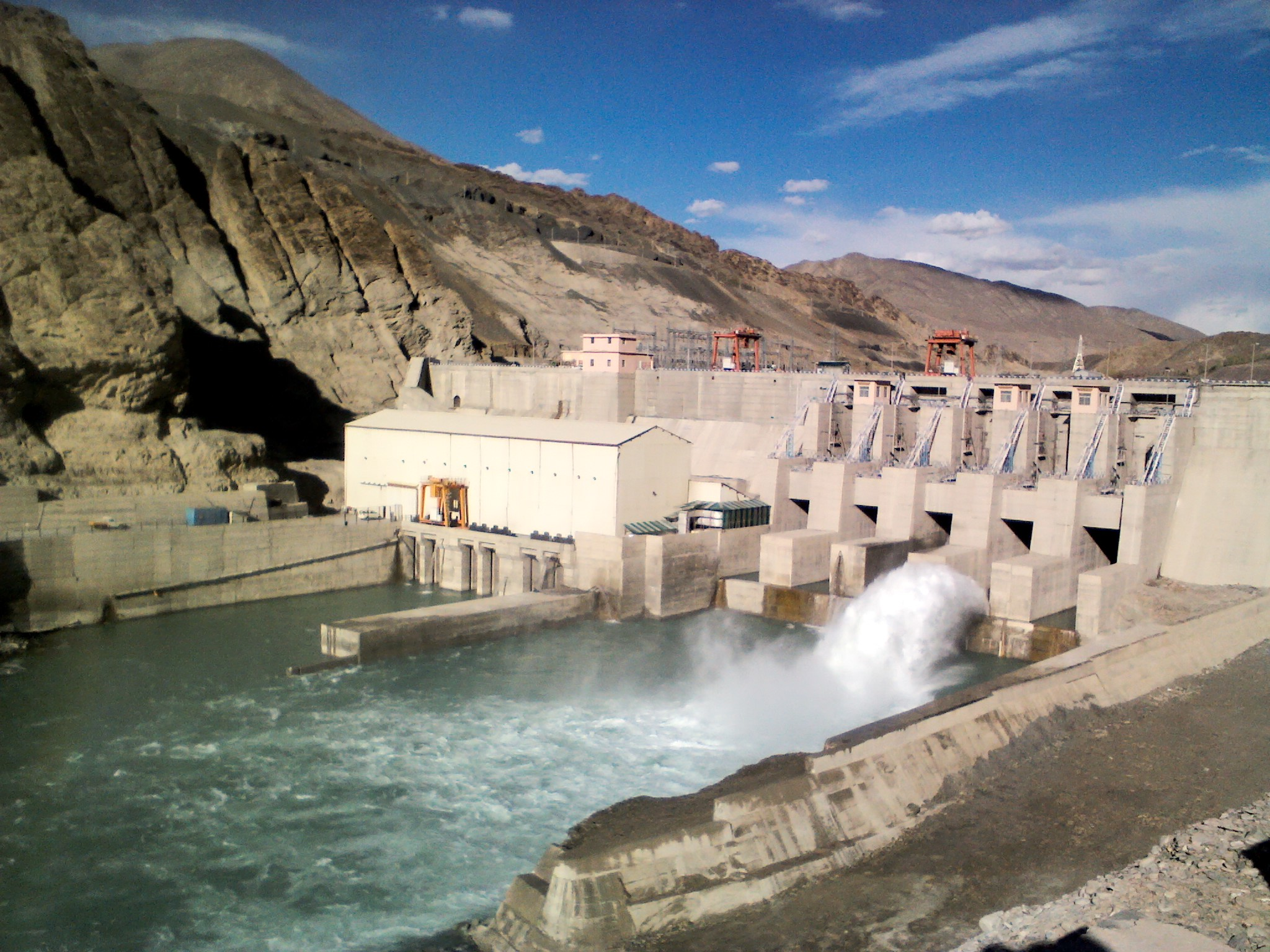
- Alchi Dam

- Location within Ladakh Location within India
- Coordinates: 34°12′55″N 77°11′06″E
- Status: C
- Construction began: September 2006
- Owner: NHPC Limited

Dam and spillways
- Type of dam: Concrete-face rock-fill
- Impounds: Indus River
- Height: 57 m (187 ft)
- Spillways: 5
- Spillway type: Blocks
- Spillway capacity: 13 m (43 ft)

Nimoo Bazgo Hydroelectric Plant
- Operator: NHPC Limited
- Commission date: Unit#3: Dec 2012, Unit#2: Jan 2013, Unit#1: June 2013
- Hydraulic head: 372 m (1,220 ft)
- Turbines: 3 x 15 MW Francis-type
- Installed capacity: 45 MW

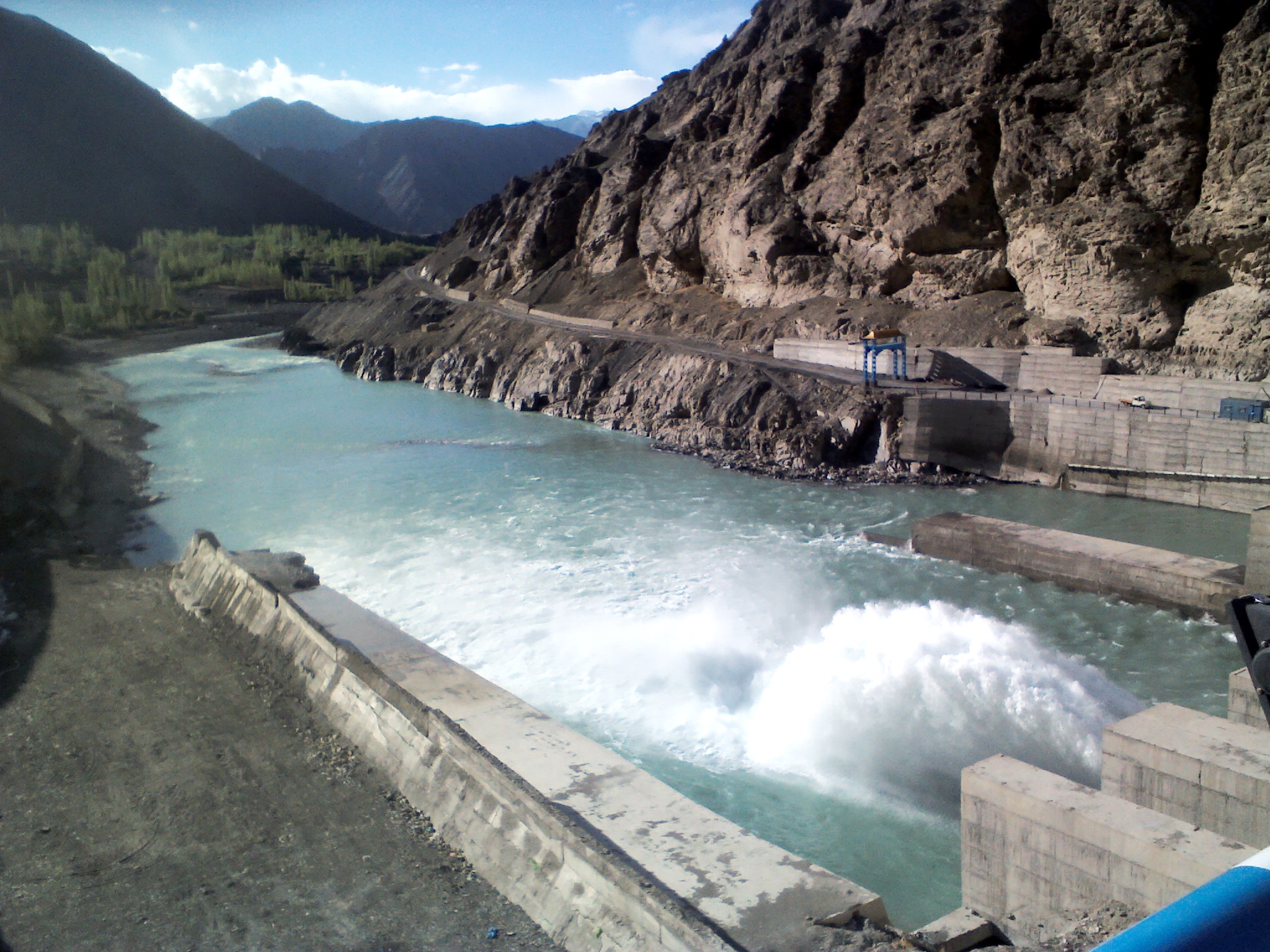
Alchi Hydroelectric Power Plant

The Nimoo Bazgo Power Project is a run-of-the-river power project on the Indus River situated at Alchi village, 75 kilometres (47 mi) from Leh in the Indian Union Territory of Ladakh. The project was conceived on 1 July 2001 and approved on 8 June 2005, and construction began on 23rd Sept, 2006. The project involved construction of a 57-high m (187 ft) concrete dam with five spillway blocks of 13 m (43 ft) each having ogee profile. The dam is 247.9m in length. It was officially completed and open in August 2014.

The Nimoo Bazgo power plant was stated to utilise a rated net head of 34 m (112 ft) to generate 239.30 gigawatt-hours (861.5 terajoules) in a 90% dependable year. The project has three surface power units of 15 MW (20,000 hp) each with a total installed capacity of 45 megawatts (60,000 hp). Every unit has a 3.3 m (11 ft) diameter, each 63 m-long (207 ft) penstocks. Each operating unit is stated to have been designed for a discharge of 48.7 m^{3}/s (1,720 cu ft/s) and also have transformer yard and switch yard. The project was connected to the northern grid through a 220 kV transmission line from Leh to Srinagar. The dam diverts water from the Indus river by a 372 m (1,220 ft) long diversion channel and involves a flooding of only 3.42 km^{2} (1.32 sq mi). Thus the power density is 13.16 megawatts per square kilometre (13.16 W/m^{2}; 34.1 MW/sq mi). The project was developed by National Hydroelectric Power Corporation (NHPC) Ltd. Bharat Heavy Electricals Ltd. (BHEL) has executed the Electro-Mechanical works.

== History ==
The project was conceived on 1 July 2001 and approved on 8 June 2005, and construction began on 23rd Sept, 2006.

The project required the removal and cutting of tens of thousands of tonnes of rock, diversion of the river flow, construction of the dam, powerhouse and reservoir. The project required development of the mountain road network, as well as delivery of construction vehicles by aircraft to Leh. The project was complicated by the difficult terrain and sub-zero mountain temperatures at some 3,500m above sea level.

All the three units of the project have been successfully commissioned. The project was inaugurated on 12 August 2014 by the Prime Minister of India Narendra Modi, in a ceremony attended by senior officials including Chief Minister of Jammu & Kashmir Omar Abdullah, National Security Adviser Ajit Kumar Doval and others.

The project, along with the Chutak Hydroelectric Plant, was certified as compliant with the Indus Waters Treaty by the Indian Central Water Commission, with the project information passed over to Pakistan.

== Notes ==
External images
- Nimoo Bazgo power project
- Nimoo Bazgo Excavation
- Nimoo Bazgo Layout Plan
