= Chutak Hydroelectric Plant =

Dam in Ladakh, India

- Interactive map of Chutak Hydroelectric Plant
- Official name: Chutak Hydroelectric Plant
- Location: Ladakh India
- Coordinates: 34°27′32.77″N 76°04′28.72″E
- Opening date: 2014

Dam and spillways
- Impounds: Suru River
- Height: 15 m (49 ft)
- Length: 47.5 m (156 ft)

Reservoir
- Creates: Chutak Barrage

The Chutak Hydroelectric Plant is a run-of-the-river power project on the Suru River (a tributary of Indus) in Kargil district in the Indian union territory of Ladakh. The barrage of the project is at Sarze village and the powerhouse is located on the right bank of the Suru near Chutak village. The project construction began on 23 September 2006, and the first three generators were commissioned in November 2012. The fourth was commissioned in January 2013.

The project included construction of a 47.5-metre-long (156 ft) barrage, having 15 m height above the crest level, an underground powerhouse, and 3.3 m dia and 10.02 km long head race tunnel and installation of four nos. of vertical Francis turbine of 11 MW each. The project utilises a gross head of 63.4 m (208 ft) to generate 216.41 GWh in a 90% dependable year with an installed capacity of 44 MW. Each 11 MW underground generating unit was designed to operate under a rated head of 52 m and a rated discharge of 24.05 cubic metres per second. The barrage diverts water from the river and involves a flooding of only 0.135 km^{2} (0.052 sq mi). Thus the power density is 44 MW per 0.135 km2, i.e. very high 326 W/m2, compared to dam-based hydroelectric projects. The project will be connected to the Northern Grid by the 220 kV Leh-Srinagar transmission line, which is to be scheduled for commissioning along with project’s commissioning.

The project was developed by M/s National Hydroelectric Power Corporation Ltd. The generating equipment was supplied, erected and commissioned by M/s Bharat Heavy Electricals Limited. The generator/turbine was manufactured by BHEL's Bhopal unit whereas the controls were supplied by BHEL's Bangalore unit. The erection and commissioning was done by BHEL's Power Sector. As of date all four generating units of this project are running successfully.

The project, along with the Nimoo Bazgo Hydroelectric Plant, was certified as compliant with the Indus Waters Treaty by the Indian Central Water Commission, with the project information passed over to Pakistan.
